= Godzilla Minus Zero =

2026 Japanese film by Takashi Yamazaki

- Theatrical release poster by Kimito Otani

Japanese name
- Katakana: ゴジラ マイナスゼロ
Transcriptions
- Revised Hepburn: Gojira Mainasu Zero
- Directed by: Takashi Yamazaki
- Written by: Takashi Yamazaki
- Produced by: Kazuaki Kishida; Gō Abe; Keiichirō Moriya
- Starring: Ryunosuke Kamiki; Minami Hamabe; Min Tanaka; Hidetaka Yoshioka; Masami Nagasawa; Yuki Yamada; Kuranosuke Sasaki; Jun Kunimura; Sakura Ando; Miou Tanaka
- Cinematography: Kōzō Shibasaki
- Edited by: Ryūji Miyajima
- Music by: Naoki Satō
- Production companies: Toho Studios; Robot Communications
- Distributed by: Toho Co., Ltd.
- Release dates: September 26, 2026 (NYFF); November 3, 2026 (Japan)
- Running time: 135 minutes
- Country: Japan
- Languages: Japanese; English
- Budget: $13–18 million
- Box office: $109.7 million

Godzilla Minus Zero (Japanese: ゴジラ-0.0(マイナスゼロ), Hepburn: Gojira mainasu zero) is a 2026 Japanese epic kaiju film written, directed, and with visual effects by Takashi Yamazaki. A sequel to Godzilla Minus One (2023), it is the 39th film in the Godzilla franchise, the 34th film thereof produced by Toho, and the sixth installment in the Reiwa era. (Note: Japan's Reiwa era began on May 1, 2019, however, Toho considers Shin Godzilla (2016) and the Polygon Pictures anime trilogy – Godzilla: Planet of the Monsters (2017), Godzilla: City on the Edge of Battle, and Godzilla: The Planet Eater (both 2018) – as part of the Reiwa era.) The film stars Ryunosuke Kamiki, Minami Hamabe, Hidetaka Yoshioka, Yuki Yamada, Kuranosuke Sasaki, Sakura Ando, and Miou Tanaka reprising their roles from Minus One, with Min Tanaka, Masami Nagasawa, and Jun Kunimura also starring as new characters. Set in 1949, the film shows postwar Japan struggling to rebuild as it faces a new threat: King Ghidorah. Godzilla reappears and is drawn into conflict with the three-headed monster, guided through human intervention.

Following the international success of Godzilla Minus One, Toho announced in November 2024 that another Yamazaki-helmed Godzilla film had been greenlit. By February 2025, Yamazaki had begun screenwriting and storyboarding the follow-up. In April 2025, Toho International's president, Kōji Ueda, clarified that the new film would be a sequel, planned for a 2026 release. Principal photography commenced in August 2025 and wrapped by December. It became the first Japanese production filmed for IMAX. The film's title was announced in November 2025. Shirogumi handled the visual effects.

Godzilla Minus Zero premiered at the 2026 New York Film Festival on September 26, and was released theatrically in Japan by Toho on November 3. Toho's subsidiary GKIDS later released the film in the United States and Canada on November 6. Critics praised its visual effects as superior to those of its predecessor, but were divided on whether the overall film was superior. The film has grossed $109.7 million worldwide, setting records for the highest-grossing opening day for any live-action film in Japan, the top opening weekend for a foreign-language live-action film in the U.S. and Canada, and the biggest IMAX global opening for a Japanese film.

== Plot ==
In 1949, two years after Godzilla's defeat and his remains sinking in Sagami Bay, (Note: As depicted in Godzilla Minus One (2023)) Japan continues its recovery from the effects of the war and Godzilla's attacks. Former kamikaze pilot Kōichi Shikishima has married Noriko Ōishi, a survivor of Godzilla's Ginza attack, who has begun to display physical mutations as a result of exposure to Godzilla's cells ("G-cells"). Their neighbor Sumiko Ōta, now operating an orphanage, helps them raise their adopted daughter Akiko. Kenji Noda, director of the Large-Scale Disaster Response Bureau, assembles a team including returning crew members Shirō Mizushima, Seiji Akitsu, and former destroyer captain Tatsuo Hotta to prepare for future threats.

Matsumoto is attacked by a dragon-like creature, which is capable of flight and firing electrical beams from its mouth. Scientists, including Hiroshima bombing survivor Kanji Murakami and his assistant Akira Hagiwara, document the attack and report their findings to Noda. The creature arrived in a meteorite as a gelatinous organism before consuming local wildlife and adopting its current form. Combining the words "chimera" and "hydra", they name it "Ghidorah". Meteorologist Makoto Aoyama tracks Ghidorah through weather patterns, as it seems to be attracted to lightning storms.

Kōichi volunteers to lead an attack against Ghidorah while it's dormant, with reluctant support from the United States. The plan involves dropping a new fuel-air bomb from a Nakajima G5N Shinzan bomber escorted by Douglas AD Skyraiders, but Ghidorah survives the explosion and kills the other escort pilots. The bomber deploys harpoons equipped with Narukami rods into Ghidorah's back, attracting a series of lightning strikes that seemingly kill it. However, Ghidorah revives and evolves into a larger, three-headed, double-tailed monster. Now called "King Ghidorah", it gains the ability to lift and smash buildings with a "gravity beam", and continues attacking cities across Japan, killing thousands.

As Ghidorah continues its rampage, Godzilla completes his regeneration and resurfaces near Kōzu-shima. Murakami argues that forcing the monsters to fight each other is the only way to defeat them, regarding Godzilla's return as "divine providence". However, Murakami secretly plots to have Godzilla destroy New York City to avenge his family, who died in the Hiroshima bombing, by using a device called the Resonance Wave Amplifier. As Murakami's plan requires Noriko to operate the amplifier due to her connection to Godzilla, Kōichi flees with his family to prevent Noriko from being used as a weapon. However, after they pass through the devastated Matsumoto, Noriko chooses to volunteer for the plan. Noda persuades Murakami to abandon his vengeance.

The bureau determines the ruins of Ginza to be the ideal battleground. They build generators and traps to entice and occupy Ghidorah, while Kōichi pilots Murakami's Kawanishi H8K seaplane to lure Godzilla with Noriko and the amplifier on board. In the ensuing clash, Godzilla uses his tail to sever one of Ghidorah's heads, but the severed head bites Godzilla's arm, forcing Godzilla to tear off his own arm to free himself. Godzilla's arm regenerates, but Ghidorah ultimately incapacitates him, burying him beneath rubble. The bureau manages to freeze Ghidorah with liquid nitrogen, before covering it with fuel to create a deadly temperature fluctuation. When the trap's fuel lines are severed, Noda activates it manually. As he drives away, Ghidorah strikes his vehicle with a beam, causing it to crash. Kōichi fires a rocket from his aircraft into Ghidorah to ignite the fuel, inadvertently killing Noda; to spare Kōichi further guilt, Aoyama instead tells him Noda was killed by Ghidorah. Kōichi and Noriko use the amplifier to resuscitate Godzilla, while Ghidorah reattaches its severed head, which has absorbed some G-cells, and develops dorsal spines and a heat ray. The monsters unleash their energy beams, but Godzilla's beam hits Ghidorah first, and Ghidorah is killed.

After Godzilla's victory, the U.S. military commences bombarding him, but receives orders to preserve him for potential future use as a weapon. They cease fire, and Godzilla returns to the ocean. Fearing the military's intentions, Murakami burns his research notes and destroys the amplifier. He attempts to flee with Hagiwara, but they are apprehended by American soldiers and arrested for "possessing classified information". Kōichi, realizing that the military could also exploit Noriko's G-cells, goes into hiding with her, and they plan to leave Akiko behind for her own safety. However, after saying goodbye to her, they decide to take her with them and go on the run together.

== Cast ==
- Ryunosuke Kamiki as Kōichi Shikishima, a former kamikaze pilot
- Minami Hamabe as Noriko Shikishima (né Ōishi), Kōichi's wife
- Min Tanaka as Kanji Murakami, a biologist carrying deep psychological scars from the war
- Hidetaka Yoshioka as Kenji Noda, the director of the Large-Scale Disaster Response Bureau
- Masami Nagasawa as Makoto Aoyama, a meteorologist
- Yuki Yamada as Shirō Mizushima, a young crewman aboard the Shinsei Maru
- Kuranosuke Sasaki as Seiji Akitsu, captain of the Shinsei Maru
- Jun Kunimura as Dr. Ogata, a medical officer
- Sakura Ando as Sumiko Ōta, Kōichi's neighbor and head of Kiyosumi Garden orphanage
- Miou Tanaka as Tatsuo Hotta, former captain of the destroyer Yukikaze
- Sae Nagatani as Akiko, Noriko and Kōichi's adopted daughter
- Kou Maehara as Akira Hagiwara, Murakami's assistant
- Kisuke Iida as Akio Itagaki, the Tōyō Balloon section chief
- Kenji Mizuhashi as Kunio Tsuruno
- Eita Okuno as Heikichi Tokiwa
- Kai Inowaki as Shoichi Honda
- Wes Wing as Major Harlan Gilbert

Shin Godzilla director Hideaki Anno makes a cameo appearance as a train passenger. Jordan Vogt-Roberts, director of the Monsterverse film Kong: Skull Island, cameos as an American soldier. Other appearances include voice actress Tomoyo Kurosawa as a distressed mother caught in Ghidorah's antigravity field; Umi Shinonome as a Matsumoto City resident; Toshihiro Yashiba as an evacuee; and Michael Arias as an American serviceman.

== Production ==
=== Development ===
Director, writer and visual effects supervisor Takashi Yamazaki and producer Kazuaki Kishida at the film's New York Film Festival premiere in September 2026.

According to producer Kazuaki Kishida, planning for a sequel to Godzilla Minus One began in late May 2023 after a strong internal reaction at the film's first completed screening for Toho employees. Director Takashi Yamazaki subsequently delivered an initial five-page plot outline for Godzilla Minus Zero shortly before Minus One's November 2023 release. Kishida remarked: "Of course, there were some differences from the final version, but the main framework was already in place."

Throughout the film's theatrical run, Yamazaki repeatedly told interviewers that no discussions of a sequel had taken place, while sharing ideas he had for one. In 2026, Yamazaki admitted that his earlier claims of "no talks" were untrue and that he had intentionally "planted the seed" for a continuation by hinting at future story directions. Kishida noted that discussions continued in parallel with the film's promotion and Academy Award campaign.

Following the critical and commercial success of Godzilla Minus One—which became one of the highest-grossing Japanese films of all time and won the Academy Award for Best Visual Effects among its many accolades—Yamazaki was confirmed on November 1, 2024, to helm another Godzilla film. The announcement was first made during the film's Japanese television broadcast on Nippon Television's Friday Road Show. At that time, Toho did not disclose if it would be a direct sequel to Godzilla Minus One or a standalone film. At the 23rd Visual Effects Society Awards on February 11, 2025, Yamazaki revealed scripting and storyboarding of his follow-up was ongoing and expected a budget higher than that of Godzilla Minus One's, which cost less than US$15 million.

When planning the sequel, Yamazaki chose King Ghidorah due to a childhood connection with the character. Born in 1964—the year of the monster's debut in Ghidorah, the Three-Headed Monster and the Year of the Dragon—Yamazaki is also from Matsumoto, Nagano, the city attacked by Ghidorah in that film. In 1971, after seeing a local flyer advertising a revival screening with the slogan "King Ghidorah attacks Matsumoto!", he attended expecting the destruction of Matsumoto Castle. In the film, however, Ghidorah merely flew over the castle, causing tiles to fall. Disappointed by this, Yamazaki later chose to include the monster in Minus Zero as a form of personal "revenge", fulfilling a 55-year desire by depicting it damaging the castle.

=== Pre-production ===
In June 2025, the Agency for Cultural Affairs–commissioned "Film Staff Development Project" disclosed that filming for Yamazaki's next movie would take place from early August to December 2025, and they were seeking film students to recruit. On July 17, Bloomberg News reported that Toho International's president, Kōji Ueda, clarified that the new Godzilla film would be a sequel and a 2026 release was currently planned. On July 27, the site yamazakimovie-extra.jp was launched to find volunteer extras for the film from August to September. It recycled the Blockbuster Monster Movie (temp) (Japanese: 超大作怪獣映画(仮)) placeholder used for Minus One during pre-production and confirmed Toho would be financing with Robot Communications, featuring an all-star Japanese cast.

=== Filming ===
Principal photography took place with extras on location in Ibaraki Prefecture from August 30 to September 14, 2025. The Hollywood Reporter claimed additional shooting took place in New Zealand and Norway. However, according to an official press release, the film was shot entirely in Japan. Filming was expected to wrap in late December. It became the first Japanese production filmed for IMAX. Yamazaki's longtime collaborator Kōzō Shibasaki served as cinematographer.

Extra recruitment reports also state that due to the film's historical drama setting, there would be restrictions on the extras' costume sizes, hairstyles, and hair colors (with hair dyeing being prohibited) for those participating as extras. A scene featuring Japanese maintenance soldiers was shot at a temple in Maizuru on November 3, which was Godzilla Day in Japan. Filming occurred around Seijōgakuen-mae Station on November 25, and in Inashiki District, Ibaraki on December 15.

The film had a roughly 30% budget increase over its predecessor, according to Yamazaki. On March 16, 2026, Yamazaki attended a joint government–industry meeting under Japan's Intellectual Property Strategy Headquarters, which addressed working conditions in the content industry. Discussing his experience on Minus Zero, he said the new Eiteki certification system reduced crew exhaustion during filming and improved working conditions, allowing more humane lives for production staff who previously endured extremely harsh schedules, but its rigid daily time limits sometimes forced production to stop even when additional shooting would have helped.

At the opening ceremony of Godzilla Fest 2025, held on November 3, 2025, at the Tokyo Dome City Hall, Toho unveiled the official title of Yamazaki's next Godzilla feature as Godzilla Minus Zero. A teaser logo, personally illustrated by Yamazaki, was shown. Yamazaki said via a pre-recorded message that he was unable to attend the festival since he is currently filming Minus Zero. It was also announced that Shirogumi will handle VFX; and production is shared between Toho Studios and Robot Communications. Industry sources told The Hollywood Reporter the same day that "the new film is being positioned not just as a sequel but as a statement piece". Plot details, cast confirmations, and an exact premiere date remained undisclosed.

On December 10, Yamazaki finished that day's filming at 5:00 p.m. and then made a surprise appearance at a Tokyo event for James Cameron's Avatar: Fire and Ash. During their onstage conversation, Cameron expressed enthusiasm for Godzilla Minus Zero and jokingly offered to direct the film's second unit if it fell behind schedule.

=== Post-production ===
The film's poster credits three visual effects supervisors: Kiyoko Shibuya, previously the visual effects director on Minus One, Takayuki Ueki, and Eishin Okubo. Takashi Yamazaki again receives the "VFX by" credit. Other returning longtime collaborators include editor Ryūji Miyajima and composer Naoki Satō.

Shirogumi again handled the visual effects, continuing its work from Minus One. Yamazaki said that the larger budget provided by Toho compared to the previous film allowed him to expand the effects team, but that the production had also "moved the goalposts" on what the shots were expected to achieve. He stated that the sequel would contain more effects cuts than Minus One and that each effects shot was more complex than those in that film.

The visual effects team expanded to around 50 on Minus Zero, gaining around 15 new members since Minus One. Notably, Yamazaki recruited CG animator Atsushi Sato—a veteran of Hollywood productions—from semi-retirement to supervise key animation, especially King Ghidorah and its physical interactions with Godzilla. Yamazaki credited Sato's work on the large-scale combat sequences and, in particular, the climactic battle amid the ruins of Ginza, which he called the most difficult scene because of the challenge of depicting the two kaiju tangling and colliding convincingly without model clipping. For Ghidorah's design, Yamazaki sought a "god bird" appearance, giving the creature an especially long tail with a curtain-like element and drawing on Sato's experience animating dragons to achieve natural aerial movement.

While promoting the film in April 2026, Yamazaki reported that the Japanese team was sending him shots daily and that a rough assembly of the film already existed, though production remained "deep in VFX land". After reviewing one in-progress sequence that morning, he described it as "probably one of the best kaiju sequences that I've ever seen" and said even the unfinished version had given him goosebumps, adding that audiences would "see something they've never seen before".

Yamazaki said the visual effect shot of Godzilla appearing near the Statue of Liberty was inspired by the shot in Cloverfield (2008) wherein its monster throws the statue's severed head. He also named Cloverfield when asked for his favorite Statue of Liberty appearance in genre cinema, and framed the image of "smashing or doing something with the Statue of Liberty" as a VFX-industry "bucket list" shot.

== Release ==
=== Marketing and promotion ===
On March 9, 2026, it was announced that footage from the film would be shown at CinemaCon at the Colosseum at Caesars Palace on April 14, with Yamazaki presenting. The teaser trailer released later that same day. Behind the scenes footage was also shown at CinemaCon. An unidentified actor provided voiceover as an American military member in the teaser; it was later revealed to be the voice of newcomer Wes Wing, who would subsequently attend the annual fan convention G-Fest as a guest. A second teaser premiered on July 9. A further trailer was released on September 8 in 1.43:1 IMAX format, revealing the presence of King Ghidorah in the film.

On August 16, 2026, Godzilla Minus Zero collaborated with the Ban'ei Kinen at Obihiro Racecourse. The event featured a Godzilla panel exhibition, a Godzilla statue, an appearance by the film's producer Kazuaki Kishida, and collaboration merchandise, including a limited-edition T-shirt, offered as a prize. In July, the Los Angeles Dodgers and Toho announced "Godzilla Minus Zero Night" at Dodger Stadium. It took place on September 24, during a game against the San Diego Padres. The first 40,000 fans in attendance received an exclusive Godzilla bobblehead, and the evening featured a large-scale drone show with Godzilla-themed visuals. The film's marketing costs for the United States and Canada came in under $10 million.

The final trailer for the film premiered during the Minus One re-release in selected Japanese theaters on October 8, 2026.

=== Theatrical ===
Godzilla Minus Zero premiered at the 2026 New York Film Festival on September 26, 2026, and was also set to be the Centerpiece screening at the 39th Tokyo International Film Festival on November 1, 2026. It released in Japan on November 3, 2026, and North America on November 6, 2026, coinciding with Ramayana: Part 1 and The Cat in the Hat, also in IMAX. This timing adheres to the longstanding Toho–Legendary Pictures agreement that prohibits competing Godzilla films from releasing in the same calendar year, as previously seen with Godzilla Minus One (2023) and Godzilla x Kong: The New Empire (2024). Legendary's next Monsterverse entry, Godzilla x Kong: Supernova, is set for 2027.

On January 9, 2026, the film was announced to be distributed by Toho's subsidiary GKIDS in North American theatres on November 6, 2026, three days after its Japanese release date on November 3, 2026. Select IMAX theaters in the United States, United Kingdom, and Mexico also had early access showings on November 3 to celebrate Godzilla Day. Notably, Minus Zero is the first Godzilla film to receive an R rating from the Motion Picture Association for its United States release, namely for "some violent content/bloody images".

== Reception ==
=== Box office ===
Godzilla Minus Zero has grossed until mid-November 2026 $25 million in Japan, $54.6 million in the United States and Canada, and $55.1 million in other territories for a worldwide total of $109.7 million.

The film opened in Japan on November 3, 2026, across 448 theatres (including 65 IMAX). It earned ¥910 million (approximately US$5.7 million) and drew over 590,000 attendees on its opening day. This set a record as the highest opening-day gross for any live-action film in Japanese history (Japanese or foreign). It represented 201% of the opening-day gross of its predecessor Godzilla Minus One (¥452.34 million). Reports noted that the single-day figure approached the first three-day total of Minus One and positioned the film to potentially become the first Godzilla entry to surpass ¥10 billion ($63.2 million) at the Japanese box office (Minus One finished at roughly ¥7.65 billion).

In the United States and Canada, the film was projected to gross $25–30 million from 3,250 theaters in its opening weekend. The film made $14.7 million on its first day, including $6.7 million from previews ($2 million of which from Tuesday's Godzilla Day screenings). Its previews became the largest for a GKIDS release in the United States and Canada. It went on to debut to $30.6 million, topping the box office. Among its box office records, it recorded the highest opening weekend for a live-action foreign-language film in the U.S. and Canada, and the largest IMAX global opening for a Japanese film, with $21.3 million of its gross coming from IMAX theaters.

=== Critical response ===
Metacritic review
breakdown (unweighted)

Positive
34 (77%)
Mixed
10 (23%)
Negative
0 (0%)

After its New York Film Festival premiere, reviewers described the film as larger in scope, bolder, and more visually impressive than Minus One, with debate over whether it was better overall than its predecessor. On the review aggregator website Rotten Tomatoes, 90% of 221 critics' reviews are positive, with an average rating of 7.8/10. The website's consensus reads: "Keeping its epic action rooted in human interest, Godzilla Minus Zero solidifies director Takashi Yamazaki's take on the King of Monsters as one of the mightiest yet by upping the ante without losing sight of its lovable characters." Metacritic, which uses a weighted average, assigned the film a score of 74 out of 100, based on 44 critics, indicating "generally favorable" reviews. Audiences polled by CinemaScore gave the film an average grade of "A" on an A+ to F scale, the same grade earned by its predecessor, while 95% of those polled by PostTrak gave the film a positive score, with 85% saying they would definitely recommend it.

Owen Gleiberman and Molly Edwards of Total Film were among the most enthusiastic critics, describing the sequel as grander and more affecting, and Edwards called it among the strongest films of the year. David Rooney of The Hollywood Reporter called it "a crackling kaiju epic every bit as exciting as its predecessor", highlighting "some of the most impressively seamless integration of major-scale CGI in recent memory" and Yamazaki's ability to keep the human drama "no less compelling than the monster faceoffs" as well as its set pieces. Jesse Hassenger, writing in The Guardian, commended the film for combining disaster-movie scope with horror-movie intensity while still favoring quality of effects over quantity.

Reservations focused on structure and tone. Kate Rife of Inverse called the film a worthy follow-up and a major spectacle, but said the human story is less tightly organized than in Minus One. William Bibbiani of TheWrap judged it one of the stronger Godzilla sequels without ranking it among the franchise's best films, arguing that the later passages become sillier and that the drama relies more on contrivance. James Mottram, reviewing for the South China Morning Post, praised the imagery and surprises while finding the ending weaker.

=== Accolades ===
Award	Date of ceremony	Category	Recipient(s)	Result	Ref.
Nikkan Sports Film Awards	27 December 2026	Best Film	Godzilla Minus Zero	Pending	
Nikkan Sports Film Awards	27 December 2026	Best Director	Takashi Yamazaki	Pending	
Nikkan Sports Film Awards	27 December 2026	Best Supporting Actress	Masami Nagasawa	Pending	

== Future ==
In an interview with The Hollywood Reporter, Yamazaki expressed interest in directing a further sequel, saying although he was happy with Minus Zero's conclusion, he would be "a bit sad" if it were to be his final Godzilla film.
