= List of accolades received by Godzilla Minus One =

Godzilla Minus One accolades
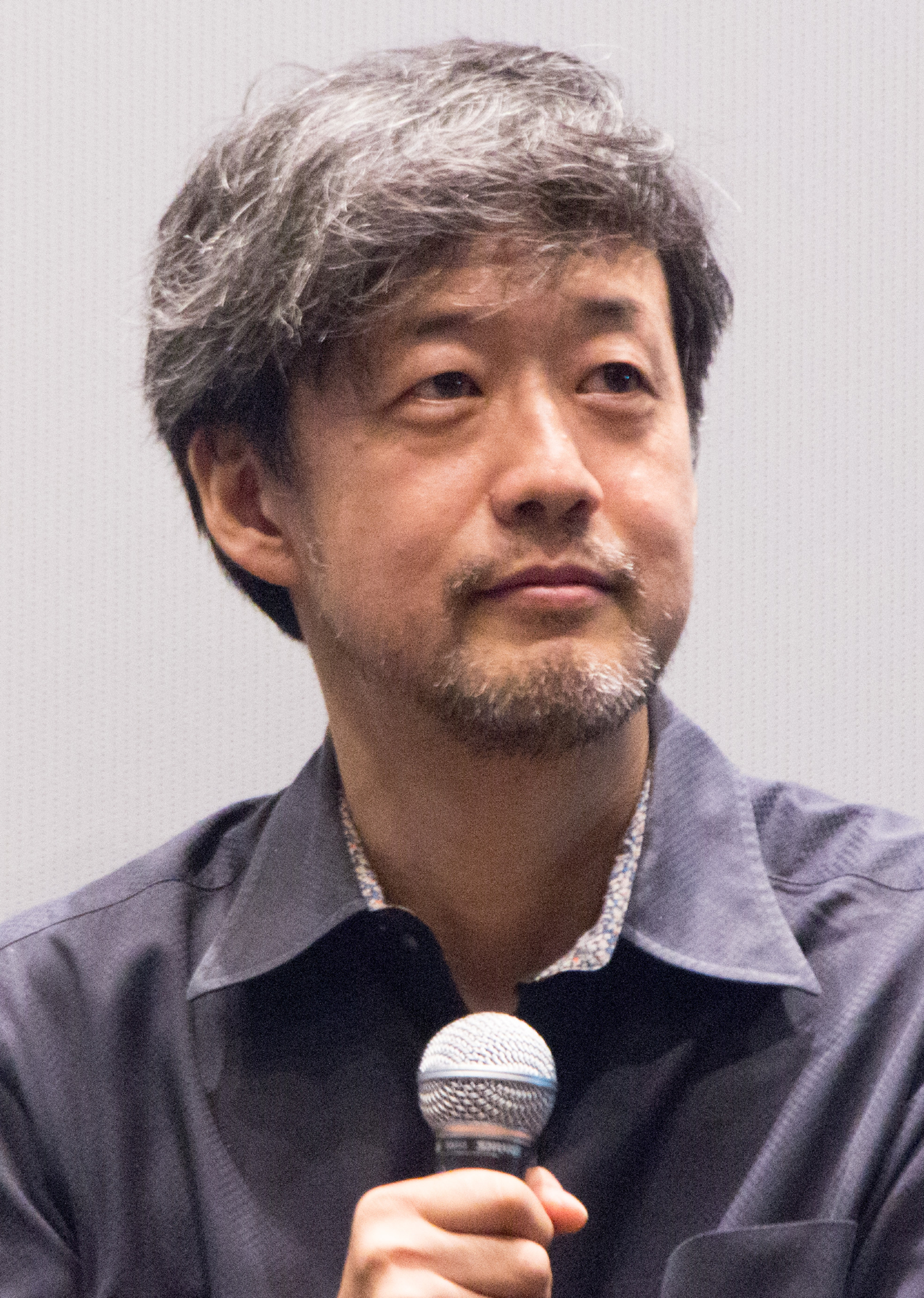
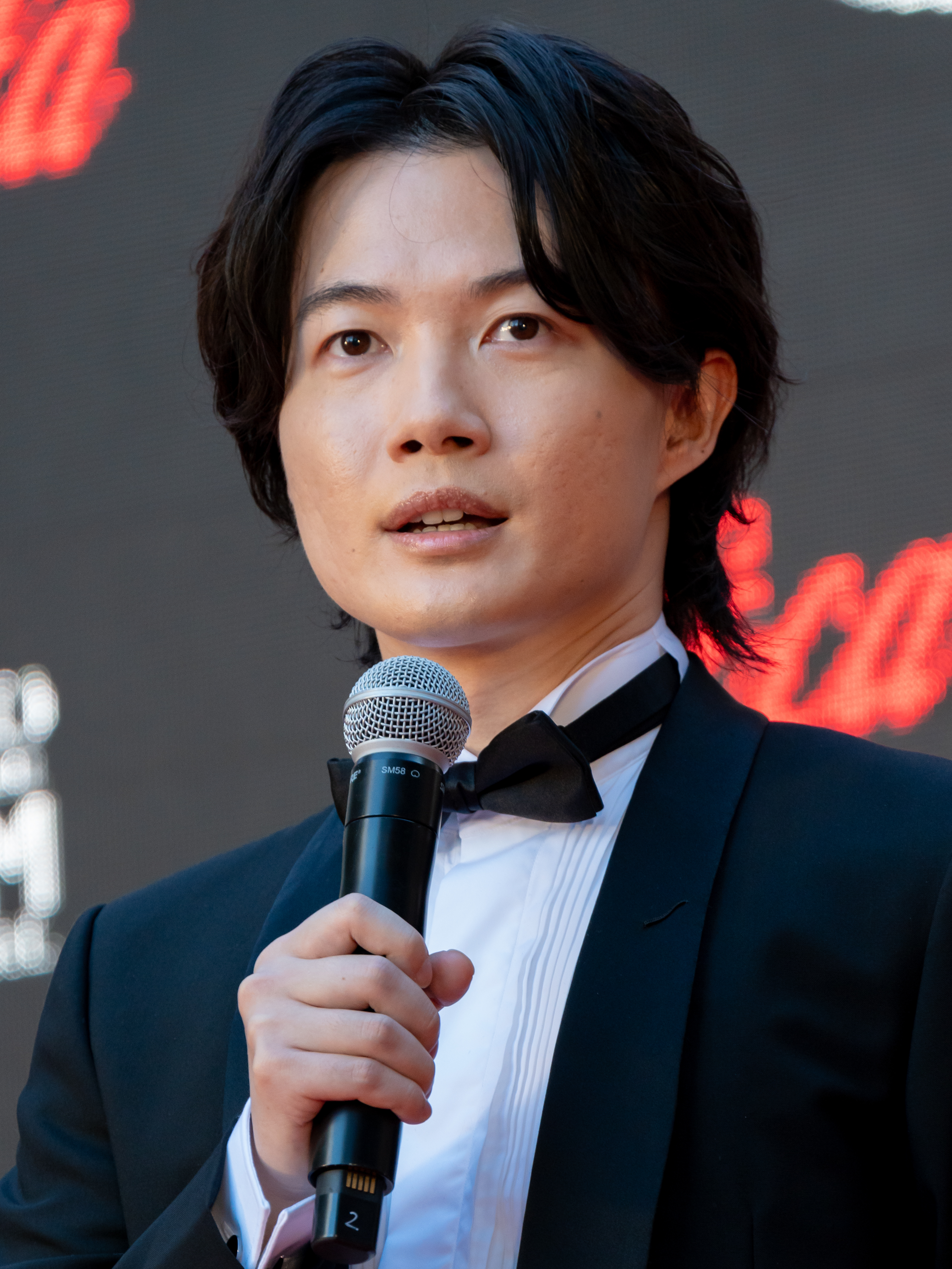
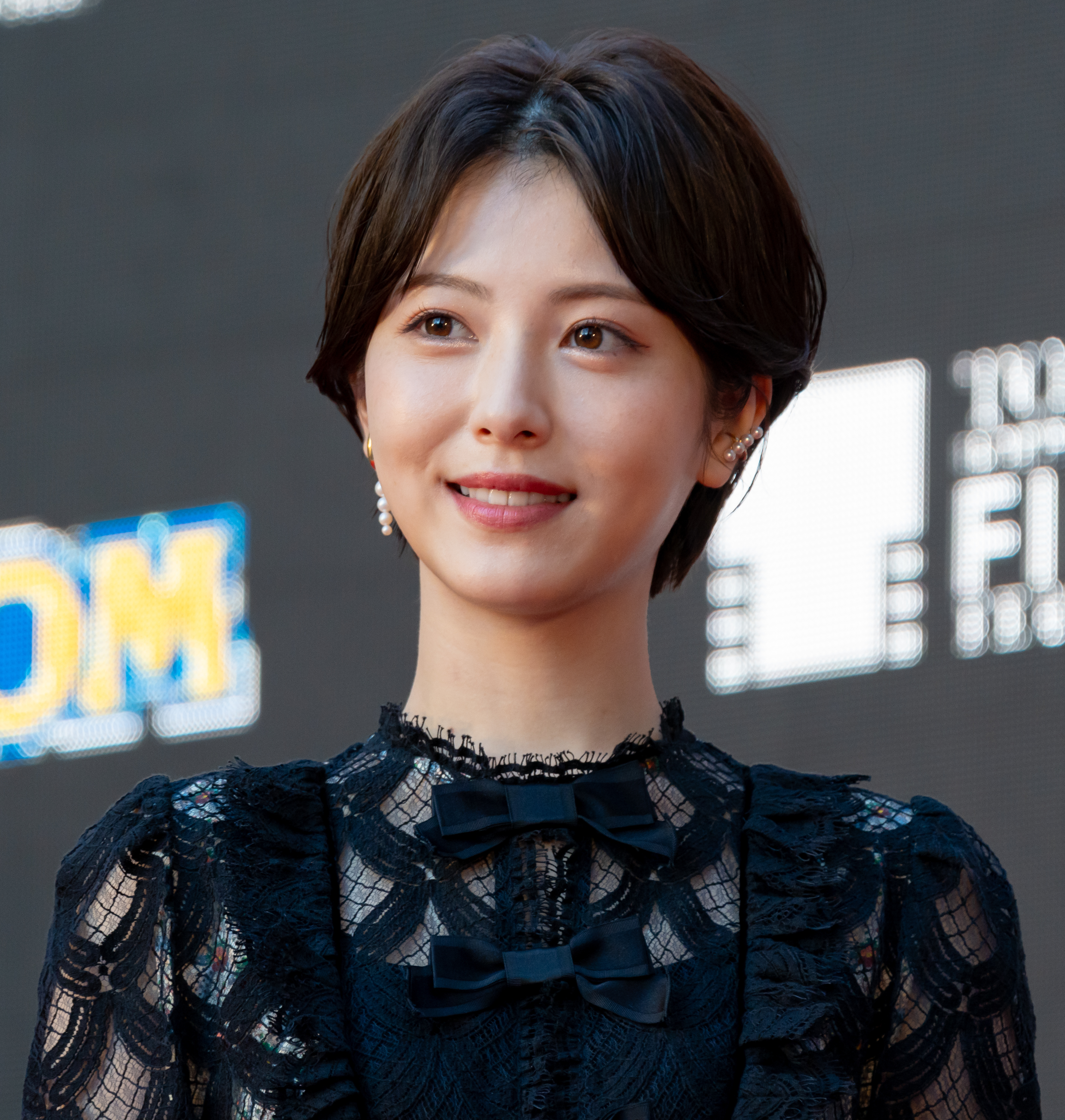
- Takashi Yamazaki (left) received several accolades for his direction, screenplay, and visual effects, as did Ryunosuke Kamiki (center) and Minami Hamabe (right) for their performances.
Accolades
Award	Wins	Nominations
Academy Awards	1	1
Asian Film Awards	2	3
Austin Film Critics Association	1	2
Blue Ribbon Awards	3	4
Bram Stoker Awards	1	1
Chicago Film Critics Association	1	6
Chicago Indie Critics	1	2
Columbus Film Critics Association	0	3
Critics' Choice Awards	0	1
Critics' Choice Super Awards	2	4
Dead Meat Horror Awards	2	3
Denver Film Critics Society	2	3
DiscussingFilm Critic Awards	1	2
Dorian Awards	0	2
Elan d'or Awards	1	1
Fangoria Chainsaw Awards	2	2
Florida Film Critics Circle	1	2
Fujimoto Awards	1	1
Georgia Film Critics Association	1	2
Golden Reel Awards	0	1
Golden Schmoes Awards	3	4
Golden Trailer Awards	0	1
Greater Western New York Film Critics Association Awards	1	1
Hawaii Film Critics Society	1	4
Hochi Film Awards	1	4
Houston Film Critics Society	0	3
Indiana Film Journalists Association	0	3
International Film Music Critics Association	1	2
Japan Academy Film Prize	8	12
Japan Film Commission	1	1
Kansas City Film Critics Circle	1	1
Las Vegas Film Critics Society	2	4
Latino Entertainment Journalists Association	0	2
Lumiere Awards	1	1
Mainichi Film Award	1	6
Music City Film Critics Association	1	2
NBP Film Awards	2	3
NBP Film Community Awards	1	3
Nikkan Sports Film Award	0	2
North Carolina Film Critics Association	1	3
North Dakota Film Society	0	1
Oklahoma Film Critics Circle	1	1
Online Film Critics Society	0	2
Online Film & Television Association	1	2
Philadelphia Film Critics Circle	0	1
Phoenix Critics Circle	0	1
Portland Critics Association	1	4
San Diego Film Critics Society	1	3
Saturn Awards	1	4
Seattle Film Critics Society	3	4
St. Louis Film Critics Association	0	1
Utah Film Critics Association	1	2
VFX-JAPAN Awards	1	1
Visual Effects Society Awards	0	1

Totals (Note: Certain award groups do not simply award one winner. They acknowledge several different recipients, have runners-up, and have third place. Since this is a specific recognition and is different from losing an award, runner-up mentions are considered wins in this award tally. For simplification and to avoid errors, each award in this list has been presumed to have had a prior nomination.)
- Wins: 69
- Nominations: 138

Godzilla Minus One (Note: Japanese: ゴジラ-1.0(マイナスワン), Hepburn: Gojira Mainasu Wan) is a 2023 Japanese epic kaiju film directed, written, and with visual effects by Takashi Yamazaki. It is the 37th installment in the Godzilla film series and the 33rd Japanese-produced Godzilla feature. The film stars Ryunosuke Kamiki as a former kamikaze pilot who faced Godzilla during World War II and blames himself for the deaths caused by the monster, which later surfaces in Tokyo. Minami Hamabe, Yuki Yamada, Munetaka Aoki, Hidetaka Yoshioka, Sakura Ando, and Kuranosuke Sasaki are featured in supporting roles.

Toho distributed the film in Japan on November 3, 2023, and in North America the following month via their subsidiary Toho International. Exceeding box office expectations, Godzilla Minus One has grossed over $115 million against an estimated budget of $10–12 million, becoming the highest-grossing Japanese-produced Godzilla film of all time. Godzilla Minus One received widespread critical acclaim, with particular praise towards its direction, screenplay, visual effects, performances, musical score, and social commentary. Rotten Tomatoes, a review aggregator, surveyed 206 reviews and judged 98% to be positive.

Godzilla Minus One garnered numerous awards and nominations, particularly for Yamazaki's visual effects. It won Best Visual Effects at the 96th Academy Awards, becoming the first film in the franchise to be nominated for an Academy Award, the first Japanese film to be nominated in that category; and making Yamazaki the first director since 1969 (when Stanley Kubrick was nominated for 2001: A Space Odyssey) to receive a Best Visual Effects nomination at the Academy Awards. The film was also nominated for three Asian Film Awards, four Blue Ribbon Awards, four Hōchi Film Awards, six Mainichi Film Awards, and four Seattle Film Critics Society Awards. The film won eight awards (including Best Film) at the Japan Academy Film Prize, becoming the most-awarded film at the 47th annual awards.

== Accolades ==
Accolades for Godzilla Minus One
Award	Date of ceremony	Category	Recipient(s)	Result	Ref.
Academy Awards	March 10, 2024	Best Visual Effects	Takashi Yamazaki; Kiyoko Shibuya; Masaki Takahashi; Tatsuji Nojima	Won	
Asian Film Awards	March 10, 2024	Best Visual Effects	Takashi Yamazaki; Kiyoko Shibuya; Masaki Takahashi; Tatsuji Nojima	Won	
Asian Film Awards	March 10, 2024	Best Supporting Actress	Minami Hamabe	Nominated	
Asian Film Awards	March 10, 2024	Best Sound	Natsuko Inoue	Won	
Austin Film Critics Association Awards	January 10, 2024	Best Film	Godzilla Minus One	6th Place	
Austin Film Critics Association Awards	January 10, 2024	Best International Film	Godzilla Minus One	Won	
Blue Ribbon Awards	February 8, 2024	Best Film	Godzilla Minus One	Won	
Blue Ribbon Awards	February 8, 2024	Best Director	Takashi Yamazaki	Nominated	
Blue Ribbon Awards	February 8, 2024	Best Actor	Ryunosuke Kamiki	Won (Note: At the Blue Ribbon Awards, Kamiki also received the Best Actor award for his performance in We're Broke, My Lord! (2023) and Hamabe also received the Best Supporting Actress award for her performance in Shin Kamen Rider (2023).)	
Blue Ribbon Awards	February 8, 2024	Best Supporting Actress	Minami Hamabe	Won	
Bram Stoker Award	June 1, 2024	Superior Achievement in a Screenplay	Takashi Yamazaki	Won	
Chicago Film Critics Association Awards	December 12, 2023	Best Use of Visual Effects	Godzilla Minus One	Won	
Chicago Film Critics Association Awards	December 12, 2023	Best Foreign Language Film	Godzilla Minus One	Nominated	
Chicago Indie Critics Awards	January 20, 2024	Best Foreign Film	Kenji Yamada; Kazuaki Kishida; Minami Ichikawa; Keiichiro Moriya	Nominated	
Chicago Indie Critics Awards	January 20, 2024	Best Visual Effects	Kiyoko Shibuya; Takashi Yamazaki	Won	
Columbus Film Critics Association Awards	January 4, 2024	Best Film	Godzilla Minus One	Nominated	
Columbus Film Critics Association Awards	January 4, 2024	Best Foreign Language Film	Godzilla Minus One	Nominated	
Columbus Film Critics Association Awards	January 4, 2024	Best Score	Naoki Satō	Nominated	
Critics' Choice Awards	January 14, 2024	Best Foreign Language Film	Godzilla Minus One	Nominated	
Critics' Choice Super Awards	April 4, 2024	Best Science Fiction/Fantasy Movie	Godzilla Minus One	Won	
Critics' Choice Super Awards	April 4, 2024	Best Actor in a Science Fiction/Fantasy Movie	Ryunosuke Kamiki	Nominated	
Critics' Choice Super Awards	April 4, 2024	Best Actress in a Science Fiction/Fantasy Movie	Minami Hamabe	Nominated	
Critics' Choice Super Awards	April 4, 2024	Best Villain in a Movie	Godzilla	Won	
Dead Meat Horror Awards	March 3, 2024	Best Digital Effects	Godzilla Minus One	Won	
Dead Meat Horror Awards	March 3, 2024	Best Lead Performer	Godzilla Minus One	Nominated	
Dead Meat Horror Awards	March 3, 2024	Best Remake or Sequel	Godzilla Minus One	Won	
Denver Film Critics Society Awards	January 12, 2024	Best Sci-Fi/Horror	Godzilla Minus One	Won	
Denver Film Critics Society Awards	January 12, 2024	Best Visual Effects	Godzilla Minus One	Nominated	
Denver Film Critics Society Awards	January 12, 2024	Best Non-English Language Feature	Godzilla Minus One	Won	
DiscussingFilm Critic Awards	January 6, 2024	Best International Film	Godzilla Minus One	Runner-up	
DiscussingFilm Critic Awards	January 6, 2024	Best Visual Effects	Godzilla Minus One	Won	
Dorian Awards	February 26, 2024	Non-English Language Film of the Year	Godzilla Minus One	Nominated	
Dorian Awards	February 26, 2024	Genre Film of the Year	Godzilla Minus One	Nominated	
Elan d'or Awards	February 8, 2024	Special Prize (Production Team)	Godzilla Minus One	Won	
Fangoria Chainsaw Awards	October 13, 2024	Best Score	Naoki Satō	Won	
Fangoria Chainsaw Awards	October 13, 2024	Best Wide Release	Godzilla Minus One	Won	
Florida Film Critics Circle Awards	December 21, 2023	Best Visual Effects	Godzilla Minus One	Won	
Florida Film Critics Circle Awards	December 21, 2023	Best Foreign Language Film	Godzilla Minus One	Nominated	
Fujimoto Awards	February 19, 2024	Fujimoto Award	Hisashi Usui; Shuji Abe; Kenji Yamada; Kazuaki Kishida; Gō Abe; Keiichirō Moriya	Won	
Georgia Film Critics Association Awards	January 5, 2024	Best Picture	Godzilla Minus One	Nominated	
Georgia Film Critics Association Awards	January 5, 2024	Best International Film	Godzilla Minus One	Won	
Golden Reel Awards	March 3, 2024	Outstanding Achievement in Sound Editing – Foreign Language Feature	Natsuko Inoue	Nominated	
Golden Schmoes Awards	March 8, 2024	Best Sci-Fi Movie of the Year	Godzilla Minus One	Won	
Golden Schmoes Awards	March 8, 2024	Most Memorable Scene in a Movie	First Attack	Nominated	
Golden Schmoes Awards	March 8, 2024	Best Special Effects of the Year	Godzilla Minus One	Won	
Golden Schmoes Awards	March 8, 2024	Biggest Surprise of the Year	Godzilla Minus One	Won	
Golden Trailer Awards	May 30, 2024	Best Foreign Action	Godzilla Minus One	Nominated	
Greater Western New York Film Critics Association Awards	January 2, 2024	Best Foreign Film	Godzilla Minus One	Nominated	
Hawaii Film Critics Society Awards	January 12, 2024	Best Visual Effects	Godzilla Minus One	Nominated	
Hawaii Film Critics Society Awards	January 12, 2024	Best Horror Film	Godzilla Minus One	Nominated	
Hawaii Film Critics Society Awards	January 12, 2024	Best Sci-Fi Film	Godzilla Minus One	Won	
Hawaii Film Critics Society Awards	January 12, 2024	Best Foreign Language Film	Godzilla Minus One	Nominated	
Hōchi Film Awards	December 11, 2023	Best Picture	Godzilla Minus One	Nominated	
Hōchi Film Awards	December 11, 2023	Best Director	Takashi Yamazaki	Won	
Hōchi Film Awards	December 11, 2023	Best Leading Actor	Ryunosuke Kamiki	Nominated	
Hōchi Film Awards	December 11, 2023	Best Supporting Actress	Minami Hamabe	Nominated	
Houston Film Critics Society Awards	January 22, 2024	Best Picture	Godzilla Minus One	Nominated	
Houston Film Critics Society Awards	January 22, 2024	Best Foreign Language Film	Godzilla Minus One	Nominated	
Houston Film Critics Society Awards	January 22, 2024	Best Visual Effects	Godzilla Minus One	Nominated	
Indiana Film Journalists Association Awards	December 18, 2023	Best Film	Godzilla Minus One	Nominated	
Indiana Film Journalists Association Awards	December 18, 2023	Best Foreign Language Film	Godzilla Minus One	Runner-up	
Indiana Film Journalists Association Awards	December 18, 2023	Best Musical Score	Naoki Satō	Nominated	
IndieWire Critics Poll	December 11, 2023	Best International Film	Godzilla Minus One	8th Place	
International Film Music Critics Association Awards	February 22, 2024	Film Score of the Year	Naoki Satō	Nominated	
International Film Music Critics Association Awards	February 22, 2024	Best Original Score for a Fantasy/Science Fiction Film	Naoki Satō	Won	
Japan Academy Film Prize	February 22, 2024	Most Popular Actor	Yuki Yamada	Won	
Japan Academy Film Prize	March 8, 2024	Picture of the Year	Godzilla Minus One	Won	
Japan Academy Film Prize	March 8, 2024	Best Director	Takashi Yamazaki	Nominated	
Japan Academy Film Prize	March 8, 2024	Best Screenplay	Takashi Yamazaki	Won	
Japan Academy Film Prize	March 8, 2024	Best Lead Actor	Ryunosuke Kamiki	Nominated	
Japan Academy Film Prize	March 8, 2024	Best Lead Actress	Minami Hamabe	Nominated	
Japan Academy Film Prize	March 8, 2024	Best Supporting Actress	Sakura Ando	Won	
Japan Academy Film Prize	March 8, 2024	Best Cinematography	Kōzō Shibasaki	Won	
Japan Academy Film Prize	March 8, 2024	Best Music	Naoki Satō	Nominated	
Japan Academy Film Prize	March 8, 2024	Best Lighting	Naruyuki Ueda	Won	
Japan Academy Film Prize	March 8, 2024	Best Art Direction	Anri Jojo	Won	
Japan Academy Film Prize	March 8, 2024	Best Sound Recording	Hisashi Takeuchi	Won	
Japan Academy Film Prize	March 8, 2024	Best Editing	Ryūji Miyajima	Won	
Japan Film Commission Awards	June 20, 2024	Excellence Award	Hamamatsu FC	Won	
Kansas City Film Critics Circle Awards	January 27, 2024	Best Science Fiction, Fantasy or Horror	Godzilla Minus One	Won	
Kinema Junpo Best Ten Awards	February 18, 2024	Best Film	Godzilla Minus One	8th Place	
Las Vegas Film Critics Society Awards	December 13, 2023	Best Horror/Sci-Fi Movie	Godzilla Minus One	Won	
Las Vegas Film Critics Society Awards	December 13, 2023	Best International Movie	Godzilla Minus One	Won	
Las Vegas Film Critics Society Awards	December 13, 2023	Best Visual Effects	Godzilla Minus One	Nominated	
Las Vegas Film Critics Society Awards	December 13, 2023	Best Action Movie	Godzilla Minus One	Nominated	
Latino Entertainment Journalists Association Awards	February 12, 2024	Best International Film	Godzilla Minus One	Nominated	
Latino Entertainment Journalists Association Awards	February 12, 2024	Best Visual Effects	Godzilla Minus One	Nominated	
Lumiere Awards	February 9, 2024	Best International Feature Film	Godzilla Minus One	Won	
Mainichi Film Awards	February 14, 2024	Excellence Award	Godzilla Minus One	Nominated	
Mainichi Film Awards	February 14, 2024	Best Director	Takashi Yamazaki	Nominated	
Mainichi Film Awards	February 14, 2024	Best Film Score	Naoki Satō	Nominated	
Mainichi Film Awards	February 14, 2024	Best Recording	Hisashi Takeuchi	Nominated	
Mainichi Film Awards	February 14, 2024	Best Art Direction	Anri Jojo	Won	
Mainichi Film Awards	February 14, 2024	Best Cinematography	Kōzō Shibasaki	Nominated	
Music City Film Critics' Association Awards	January 15, 2024	Best International Film	Godzilla Minus One	Won	
Music City Film Critics' Association Awards	January 15, 2024	Best Action Film	Godzilla Minus One	Nominated	
NBP Film Awards	February 26, 2024	Best International Feature Film	Godzilla Minus One	Nominated	
NBP Film Awards	February 26, 2024	Best Sci-Fi/Horror Film	Godzilla Minus One	Won	
NBP Film Awards	February 26, 2024	Best Visual Effects	Godzilla Minus One	Won	
NBP Film Community Awards	February 19, 2024	Best International feature Film	Godzilla Minus One	Nominated	
NBP Film Community Awards	February 19, 2024	Best Sci-Fi/Horror Film	Godzilla Minus One	Won	
NBP Film Community Awards	February 19, 2024	Best Visual Effects	Godzilla Minus One	Runner-up	
Nikkan Sports Film Awards	December 27, 2023	Yūjirō Ishihara Award	Godzilla Minus One	Nominated	
Nikkan Sports Film Awards	December 27, 2023	Best Supporting Actress	Minami Hamabe	Nominated	
North Carolina Film Critics Association Awards	January 3, 2024	Best Narrative Film	Godzilla Minus One	Nominated	
North Carolina Film Critics Association Awards	January 3, 2024	Best Foreign Language Film	Godzilla Minus One	Nominated	
North Carolina Film Critics Association Awards	January 3, 2024	Best Special Effects	Kiyoko Shibuya	Won	
North Dakota Film Society Awards	January 15, 2024	Best Visual Effects	Kiyoko Shibuya; Takashi Yamazaki	Nominated	
Oklahoma Film Critics Circle Awards	January 3, 2024	Best International Film	Godzilla Minus One	Runner-up	
Online Film Critics Society Awards	January 22, 2024	Best Visual Effects	Godzilla Minus One	Nominated	
Online Film Critics Society Awards	January 22, 2024	Best Film Not in the English Language	Godzilla Minus One	Nominated	
Online Film & Television Association Awards	March 3, 2024	Best Foreign Language Film	Godzilla Minus One	Nominated	
Online Film & Television Association Awards	March 3, 2024	Best Visual Effects	Godzilla Minus One	Won	
Philadelphia Film Critics Circle Awards	December 18, 2023	Philips Steaks Cheesesteak Award	Godzilla Minus One	Runner-up	
Phoenix Critics Circle Awards	December 18, 2023	Best Foreign Language Film	Godzilla Minus One	Nominated	
Portland Critics Association Awards	January 15, 2024	Best Film Not in the English Language	Godzilla Minus One	Nominated	
Portland Critics Association Awards	January 15, 2024	Best Science Fiction Feature	Godzilla Minus One	Won	
Portland Critics Association Awards	January 15, 2024	Best Visual Effects	Godzilla Minus One	Nominated	
Portland Critics Association Awards	January 15, 2024	Best Stunts or Action Choreography	Godzilla Minus One	Nominated	
Rondo Hatton Classic Horror Awards	June 1, 2024	Best Film of 2023	Godzilla Minus One	Won	
San Diego Film Critics Society Awards	December 19, 2023	Best Foreign Language Film	Godzilla Minus One	Runner-up	
San Diego Film Critics Society Awards	December 19, 2023	Best Visual Effects	Godzilla Minus One	Won	
San Diego Film Critics Society Awards	December 19, 2023	Best Sound Design	Godzilla Minus One	Nominated	
Saturn Awards	February 2, 2025	Best International Film	Godzilla Minus One	Won	
Saturn Awards	February 2, 2025	Best Film Director	Takashi Yamazaki	Nominated	
Saturn Awards	February 2, 2025	Best Film Screenwriting	Takashi Yamazaki	Nominated	
Saturn Awards	February 2, 2025	Best Film Visual / Special Effects	Masaki Takahashi; Tatsuiji Nojima; Kiyokk Shubuya; Takashi Yamazaki	Nominated	
Seattle Film Critics Society	January 8, 2024	Best International Film	Takashi Yamazaki	Won	
Seattle Film Critics Society	January 8, 2024	Best Visual Effects	Takashi Yamazaki; Kiyoko Shibuya	Won	
Seattle Film Critics Society	January 8, 2024	Best Action Choreography	Takashi Yamazaki	Nominated	
Seattle Film Critics Society	January 8, 2024	Villain of the Year	Godzilla	Won	
St. Louis Film Critics Association Awards	December 17, 2023	Best Visual Effects	Takashi Yamazaki	Nominated	
Utah Film Critics Association Awards	January 6, 2024	Best Non-English Feature	Godzilla Minus One	Runner-up	
Utah Film Critics Association Awards	January 6, 2024	Best Visual Effects	Godzilla Minus One	Won	
VFX-JAPAN Awards	March 18, 2024	Best Theatrical Live-Action Film	Godzilla Minus One	Won	
Visual Effects Society Awards	February 21, 2024	Outstanding Animated Character in a Photoreal Feature	Kosuke Taguchi; Takashi Yamazaki (for Godzilla)	Nominated	
Yokohama Film Festival	February 4, 2024	Top 10 Japanese Films	Godzilla Minus One	Runner-up	
