= Pixl =

Pixl may refer to:

- Pixl, a species of fairy-like characters in Super Paper Mario
- PiXL, a vision correction procedure
- PIXL, acronym for Planetary Instrument for X-Ray Lithochemistry, an instrument on the Perseverance Mars rover

== See also ==
- Pixel (disambiguation)
