= Pixel (disambiguation) =

A pixel is the base element of a digital image in computer graphics.

Pixel may also refer to:

== Technology ==
- Google Pixel, a line of consumer electronics devices that run ChromeOS or the Android operating system, including:
  - Pixel (smartphone), Android phones
    - Pixel (1st generation) and Pixel XL (2016)
- Quad (rocket), a VTOL rocket known as Pixel, developed in 2006 by Armadillo Aerospace

== Entertainment ==
- Daisuke Amaya, a game developer with the pseudonym Pixel, creator of the freeware game Cave Story
- Kane Parsons, known online as Kane Pixels, a British-American YouTuber, VFX artist, musician, and filmmaker
- Pixel (album), 2025 debut studio album by Ele A
- Pixel (board game), a Mensa select board game
- Pixel (band), a Norwegian experimental jazz band
- Pixel (LazyTown), a fictional character in a children's television series
- Pixel (magazine), the Polish magazine about video games and pop culture
- Pixel (webcomic), a webcomic written by Chris Dlugosz
- Pixel, a fictional cat from Robert A. Heinlein's novel The Cat Who Walks Through Walls
- Pixels (2010 film), a French animated short
- Pixels (2015 film), an American science fiction comedy film starring Adam Sandler based on the 2010 short film

== Other uses ==
- IP Pixel, a Chicago-based interactive advertising agency

== See also ==
- Tracking pixel, a web bug, a method to track user behavior on web sites
- Pixl (disambiguation)
- Pixel Art
- P1X3L, a Cantopop boy group
