= Atsushi Sato (animator) =

Japanese animator (born 1964)

- 佐藤 篤司
- Born: 1964 (age 61–62); Tokyo, Japan
- Education: Tama Art University (Visual Design); Tokai University (Computer Image Design)
- Occupations: CG animator; character animator; animation supervisor
- Years active: 1991–present
- Employers: Walt Disney Feature Animation (1996–2002); Weta Digital (2002–2005); Sony Pictures Imageworks (2006–present); Shirogumi (2026–present)

Atsushi Sato (佐藤 篤司, Satō Atsushi; born 1964) is a Japanese computer graphics (CG) animator. He has maintained a long career at major Hollywood visual effects and animation studios, including Walt Disney Feature Animation, Weta Digital, and Sony Pictures Imageworks. His credits span creature and character animation on landmark films such as Dinosaur (2000), The Lord of the Rings: The Two Towers (2002) and The Return of the King (2003), I, Robot (2004), King Kong (2005), multiple Spider-Man films, and recent Japanese productions including contributions to Shin Godzilla (2016) and Godzilla Minus Zero (2026).

== Life and career ==
Sato was born in Tokyo in 1964. He first encountered computer graphics in high school after seeing Tron (1982). He later attended the Visual Design Department of Tama Art Junior College, which later became part of Tama Art University. Part-time lecturer Etsuo Genda introduced him to early computer graphics (CG) paint tools and image-processing concepts. After graduation he worked in graphic design while continuing night classes. He also studied for roughly three years (including one year as a research student) at Tokai University's Takanawa College Computer Image Design course, where he created his own programs and images under instructors including Genda, the late Tomohiro Ohira, Masahiko Inakage, Hiroko Uchiyama, and Toshihiro Imama. At the time, formal CG education in Japan was limited to a handful of specialist schools and the earliest university programs; the curriculum was still being developed through trial and error.

While working in Japan he created full-CG imagery for local amusement-park rides and exhibition equipment using early general-purpose tools such as TDI Explorer (he has described himself as belonging to the first generation that used such tools rather than specialized software like Links or JCGL). He participated in the development of the first PlayStation demo Fortezza, was involved with a CG artist collective known as Digital Image, and won a prize in a PIXEL magazine CG contest. The contest brought him to the attention of NHK producer Hirofumi Ito, producer of The Universe Within, a pioneering CG-animated television special. This connection later enabled his move to overseas.

Sato moved to the United States in 1991. In interviews he has said he had no rigid long-term plan at the time; he intended to train in the U.S. for roughly five years and then return to Japan. He was influenced by a lifelong interest in film and a vague ambition to work on Hollywood movies (initially hoping for a place at Industrial Light & Magic). After arriving he approached Ito at a lecture, submitted a demo reel, and was directed toward Magic Box Productions, a small Japanese-American CG company in the Los Angeles area that aimed to adapt Japanese characters and properties for the international market.

He quit his Japanese job, waited several months, then flew to Los Angeles and called the company from outside its doors, insisting on a chance. He was given a three-month trial during which he single-handedly produced a short titled The Hanging Gardens of Babylon. The piece was accepted into the SIGGRAPH's Electronic Theater, securing him full employment. For approximately three years at Magic Box he worked as a generalist CG designer, creating pilot films that attempted to translate Japanese comic characters (including works inspired by Go Nagai's Mazinger, Osamu Tezuka's Astro Boy, and Shigeru Mizuki) into CG for Hollywood pitches. None of these projects succeeded commercially. He was also dispatched for three months as the sole CG artist to Francis Ford Coppola's American Zoetrope development team working on an unproduced Pinocchio project at Coppola's winery. Sato has described the experience as dreamlike, working alongside figures such as former Disney character designer Thom Enriquez and future Dinosaur (2000) co-director Eric Leighton, although the film was never made.

In the mid-1990s Sato submitted demo reels to several studios. Disney responded first around January 1996, initially offering registration in a talent system and later a role. He joined Walt Disney Feature Animation after declining a Mulan assignment that would have required relocation to Florida; the Los Angeles opportunity that followed was Dinosaur (2000). He underwent an intensive five-month training program (approximately three months of traditional animation fundamentals plus two months focused on CG), which included life drawing, analysis of Disney-style movement, and practical CG animation. He has recalled that the training was thorough and that active Disney artists served as instructors.

On Dinosaur he served as supervising character animator responsible for the herd characters, carnotaurs, and raptors. The production was large (hundreds of staff, with a dedicated facility known as The Secret Lab) and combined CG characters with live-action-style environments. He also worked as a lead animator on 102 Dalmatians (2000) and is credited in connection with other early-2000s projects. In later interviews he has discussed the distinctive "Disney style" of animation—exaggerated anticipations, follow-throughs, and expressive arcs that American animators are often trained in from the beginning—and the necessity of deliberately "switching heads" when moving to more realistic live-action creature or character work. He has noted that while the training is valuable for learning fundamentals, over-reliance on it can limit range.

While still at Disney, Sato received a recommendation from a visual-effects supervisor and a call from a Weta producer inviting him to help with the final push on The Lord of the Rings: The Two Towers (2002). He joined within roughly two weeks on an initial four-month (later extended) contract that ultimately lasted about 3.5–4 years. He worked as a senior animator on The Two Towers and The Return of the King (2003), contributing to creature performances including dragons, eagles, and other fantastical beings; he has described using sketches extensively for poses (for example, an eagle rescue shot). He later advanced to animation supervisor on I, Robot (2004) and King Kong (2005).

On King Kong he oversaw a large team; he has described the role as involving more managerial, scheduling, and political pressure than pure creative work, with the supervisor often caught between the animation team and upper management during tight deadlines. At Weta he was treated as a freelancer (individual business owner) rather than a unionized studio employee; the environment was described as "wild" compared with Disney or later Sony, with skilled freelancers gathered for intense crunches and relatively little formal overtime management. He has noted that direct conversations with Peter Jackson were possible at Weta, unlike the more layered review processes at larger Hollywood studios. After King Kong he declined further supervisory offers and returned to a senior animator role, citing a desire for broader animation experience beyond creatures, the need to improve English communication skills for leadership positions, and a growing interest in creating his own original work.

Sato joined Sony Pictures Imageworks around 2006 (beginning around Beowulf) and has remained affiliated with the studio for roughly two decades, later relocating with its Vancouver operations in 2014. He has worked primarily as a senior or character animator on both live-action visual-effects films and fully animated features. Other notable Hollywood credits include Cloudy with a Chance of Meatballs (2009), Alice in Wonderland (2010) and its sequel (2016), The Smurfs (2011), The Amazing Spider-Man (2012) and its sequel (2014), Oz the Great and Powerful (2013), Edge of Tomorrow (2014), Kingsman: The Golden Circle (2017), The Meg (2018), Spider-Man: Into the Spider-Verse (2018), Spider-Man: Far from Home (2019), The Sea Beast (2022), Ghostbusters: Frozen Empire (2024), A Minecraft Movie (2025), and KPop Demon Hunters (2025).

In a 2013 MyNavi interview conducted while he was working on Oz the Great and Powerful, Sato described Sony Pictures Imageworks' role as the primary VFX vendor handling more than 80% of the film's visuals. The animation team grew from roughly 20 to nearly 60 people, with total creative staff (including effects, compositing, and modeling) reaching 200–300 over about a year of production. He personally worked on the film for approximately six months after finishing The Amazing Spider-Man. He animated the baboons (hihi), with the direction that they should appear neither fully human nor purely wild but possess a degree of intelligence in their gestures and expressions. He noted that director Sam Raimi preferred to review rough animation in 3D from early stages, which increased rendering times and file sizes dramatically (single files reaching around 300 GB).

On Spider-Man: Into the Spider-Verse he has spoken positively about working with limited frame rates (including 2s-style animation) and drawing inspiration from Japanese anime such as Samurai Champloo. He has described the 2s approach as enjoyable because it raises the value of each individual frame and was relatively rare in U.S. production at the time. In the 2026 interviews he reflected on the hierarchical structure of Hollywood animation departments, the intense review process (daily or near-daily in-person or online reviews that can run from morning to night), and the ongoing technical challenge of photorealistic human animation versus creature work.

Sato has periodically contributed to Japanese projects as well. For Shin Godzilla (2016) he took roughly three months of leave from Imageworks, living in a weekly mansion in Setagaya while working at Shirogumi's Sangenjaya studio. He handled previs revisions and animation, including transformation sequences up to "Kamata-kun", with later follow-up from Vancouver. In 2026 he was brought back from semi-retirement by director Takashi Yamazaki to contribute key animation to Godzilla Minus Zero, particularly sequences featuring physical interaction between Godzilla and King Ghidorah. Yamazaki has specifically credited Sato's work on the large-scale kaiju combat. At Shirogumi's Chofu studio he has worked as essentially the only full-time dedicated animator amid a larger generalist team; he has remarked on the much smaller team sizes and closer director proximity compared with Hollywood (for example, sitting adjacent to Yamazaki).
