= Godzilla (Takashi Yamazaki) =

Fictional monster, or kaiju

- Godzilla character
- Godzilla's irradiated form roaring and charging up in a destroyed Ginza as part of promotional material for Godzilla Minus One (2023)
- First appearance: Godzilla Minus One (2023)
- Last appearance: Godzilla Minus Zero (2026)
- Adapted by: Takashi Yamazaki
- Designed by: Takashi Yamazaki; Kosuke Taguchi

In-universe information
- Alias: Gojira
- Species: Mutated amphibious reptile
- Origin: Bikini Atoll (1946)
- Home: Odo Island (1945)
- Height: 15 meters (initial) (Note: As depicted in Godzilla Minus One (2023)); 50.1 meters (irradiated)
- Weight: 20,000 tons (irradiated; estimated)

Godzilla (/ɡɒdˈzɪlə/ ɡod-ZIL-ə) (Note: Japanese: ゴジラ, Hepburn: Gojira; IPA: [ɡoꜜʑiɾa]) is a giant monster, or kaiju, that first appears as the titular antagonist of the 2023 film Godzilla Minus One, the 37th entry in the Godzilla film series. It was adapted and co-designed by Takashi Yamazaki. In Godzilla Minus One, he is depicted as a huge, dinosaurian creature, known only by the people of Odo Island, who was irradiated by nuclear bomb testings during Operation Crossroads in 1946, causing him to enact terrible vengeance on humanity by wreaking havoc across post-war Japan. The ensuing calamity and advent of Godzilla brings Japan to a state of "below zero" following the aftermath of World War II.

Godzilla also appeared in two films directed by Yamazaki, both sharing the title, Godzilla the Ride, but not as when he was in Minus One. Godzilla appeared in the 2021 film Godzilla the Ride: Giant Monsters Ultimate Battle and in the 2025 film Godzilla the Ride: Great Clash. Godzilla returned in the 2026 film Godzilla Minus Zero.

== Overview ==
=== Design ===
We wanted to make Godzilla very, very cool for this film. The head is on the smaller side, the legs are very thick. When the feet are stomping on the ground, you can almost see the toes being raised, like a wild animal's. And we wanted impact for the audience, so there's an intense level of getting up close, personal and detailed, that you can't really do with a man in a suit.

In terms of polygon counts, we're talking millions that went into creating Godzilla this time. In terms of the skin texture, there was a dinosaur origin, but when it's wounded, a regeneration happens and there's a different texture, like you would see on any wound. We wanted a mix, brought in new layers that would make the look very unique.

We wanted to go back to the original reason for Godzilla's existence. The creature is a metaphor for nuclear weapons, so we mimicked the way a weapon would work inside of his body. Each element would come together and create an implosion, and that's when the blue rays would come out.

— Takashi Yamazaki, Los Angeles Times (February 2024)

Godzilla's design used for Godzilla the Ride: Giant Monsters Ultimate Battle (2021).

Yamazaki previously created a similar version of Godzilla for Godzilla the Ride: Giant Monsters Ultimate Battle (2021), a 5-minute flying theater ride that debuted at Seibu-en in 2021. He designed the Ride incarnation through sketches and digital sculpting in ZBrush, with modeling head Kosuke Taguchi creating the final, 380-million-polygon model. Yamazaki combined elements from the Heisei and Monsterverse iterations for this heroic incarnation. Aware that the theater ride would contain aerial shots of the kaiju, Yamazaki gave it a small head and large thighs. Yamazaki described Godzilla thusly: "It was both cool and frightening, while still embodying the common elements of the Godzilla tradition. We wanted a vertical stance, with very thick and robust legs, giving the overall shape a mountain-like appearance. We focused on making the lower body very massive and the face frightening, yet unmistakably Godzilla."

As usual, Yamazaki worked with the VFX company that gave him his start of film industry, Shirogumi, and came to view Godzilla the Ride as a test function for Godzilla Minus One. Shirogumi came to learn just how frightening Godzilla could be in close-ups, which informed the approach they would take to the upcoming feature. After some initial design explorations, with iterations including "one with a strong, animalistic quality, one with cells that regenerate but create errors, and one with a wicked expression that reminded [him] of Scarface", Yamazaki opted to use the Ride design as a starting point for the Minus One design.

Godzilla's design used for Godzilla Minus One (2023).

Once again, Yamazaki made a rough model in ZBrush and Taguchi expanded it into something detailed enough for IMAX theaters. In the process, Godzilla became "sharper and more pointy", especially its dorsal plates. Its eyes were "golden, almond-shaped", almost human, and relatively small in imitation of Hollywood Godzillas. Like Godzilla vs. King Ghidorah (1991), Godzilla first appears in a pre-irradiated form during World War II. The initial form was given a stance and proportions closer to that of a theropod dinosaur; behind the scenes, a muscle simulation was conducted to make it move more convincingly. Such measures were deliberately avoided with the irradiated Godzilla, who Yamazaki viewed as "both a monster and a deity", to keep it from moving too animalistically. Shirogumi also forewent performance capture, in contrast with Shin Godzilla (2016). A physical model of Godzilla was 3D-printed as a reference, though Yamazaki admitted; "it was also kind of a setup because I just wanted a 3D-printed Godzilla from Minus One."

Yamazaki's wife, Shimako Sato, also observed that Godzilla's behavior reminded her of the two cats they got prior to starting production. Yamazaki believed he was subconsciously nudging his animators towards giving the kaiju more feline tendencies, explaining: "Right before we went into production, [my wife and I] actually got a couple of cats. And I love my cats so much, so perhaps there was a subconscious tendency for me to sign off on [visual effects] shots that looked like them or just looked more cat-like."

=== Roar ===
For this Godzilla's roar, sound designer Natsuko Inoue used the roars played over the opening credits of the 1954 film as a starting point, then "gradually add[ed] width and deep bass tones." Inoue initially tried creating original roars through experiments with a contrabass, much as Ichiro Minawa and Akira Ifukube did in 1954, but Yamazaki deemed the results too modern and animal-like.

== Appearances ==
=== Films ===
==== Godzilla Minus One (2023) ====
In 1945, Godzilla first appeared on Odo Island, resembling a fifteen-meter-tall theropod-like reptile and slaughtered the inhabitants of the military base, leaving Koichi Shikishima and Sosaku Tachibana the only survivors from the attack. He first demolished the watchtower and killed the officer stationed there before searching for his comrades who hid in a nearby trench. Though he was ordered to bombard the creature with his plane's guns, Shikishima was too paralyzed by fear to do so, leading his comrades to snap and open fire on Godzilla themselves. Predictably, their guns only enraged the creature, who then proceeded to massacre the soldiers as soon as they scrambled out of cover. The one-sided battle culminated with Godzilla destroying Shikishima's plane and knocking its pilot out before leaving.

A year later, Godzilla was caught up in Operation Crossroads and mutated into a fifty-meter-tall behemoth and proceeded to destroy the American fleet before making its way into Japanese waters. Due to the rising tensions between the United States and Soviet Union, the U.S. military could not deploy their forces to intercept with the beast.

In 1947, Godzilla destroyed a ship out at the sea which was then found by Shikishima and his colleagues on board of the minesweeper Shinsei Maru at Ogasawara Islands. The sight of surrounding dead deep-sea fishes there alarmed Shikishima who finally revealed to his colleagues the culprit of the attack to be the same creature who laid waste upon the outpost at Odo Island back in 1945 as opposed of American forces. Godzilla revealed himself by ambushing the Kaishin Maru, the sister ship of Shinsei Maru which accompanied them before chasing the group. During the chase, they detonated both sea mines aboard the boat to stop the creature where the last mine burst inside Godzilla's mouth, severely wounding him, but the damage was quickly undone due to Godzilla's enhanced regenerative abilities. He was then intercepted by the heavy cruiser Takao and proceeded to battle the vessel before it managed to get the drop on him and obliterate the heavy cruiser with his heat ray, much to Shikishima and his colleague's horror and utter disbelief.

Later, Godzilla would make landfall in Tokyo and proceed to destroy Ginza. After being fired upon by the remnants of the Japanese army, Godzilla retaliated by firing his heat ray towards the tanks within Ginza, causing an explosion that destroyed a massive portion of Ginza, after roaring at the mushroom cloud in the sky, and Shikishima screaming in grief, Godzilla returned to the ocean.

With the Japanese government wanting no part in Godzilla's eradication, the civilians and veterans of WWII had to take matters into their own hands. For that, they formulated Operation Wada Tsumi, a plan to kill Godzilla by using explosive decompression by using canisters of Freon gas and balloons tied around him. Shikishima led Godzilla out into the attack point using a Shinden fighter plane that Tachibana had modified prior. While the plan to sink Godzilla failed, they opted to kill Godzilla by bringing him up to the surface at a fast rate. While the effort managed to injure him, with the help of additional naval craft, however, this wasn't enough as Godzilla surfaced once more. Now absolutely furious, he prepared to fire another heat ray at the nearby warships. However, at the last second, Shikishima flew his Shinden into Godzilla's mouth, blowing up the monster's head, after Shikishima had ejected himself from the plane, the explosion caused Godzilla's built-up atomic energies to explode from the inside out.

At the end of the film, a portion of Godzilla's corpse had still contained living matter and proceeded to regenerate as it sank deeper to the bottom of the ocean.

==== Godzilla Minus Zero (2026) ====
Godzilla, as depicted in Godzilla Minus Zero

Two years following Godzilla's defeat, Japan organized the Large-Scale Disaster Response Bureau to deal with similar threats to Godzilla. In that time, Japan faced vicious attacks from a new threat called King Ghidorah, an extraterrestrial organism that had come from space and rapidly transformed into an aggressive dragon-like monster that terrorized the countryside. Not long after a failed retaliation attack from the Bureau against Ghidorah, Godzilla regenerated and reemerged from the sea, bigger than before, destroying a naval ship in the area. Realizing the opportunity to deal with both threats, the Bureau decides to pit both monsters against each other in the hopes they'll either wipe each other out or weaken the victor enough to be finished off by the military. The Bureau utilized a device called the Resonance Wave Amplifier and used Noriko, a Ginza survivor who had been afflicted with Godzilla's cells, to lure Godzilla to the Ginza ruins where Ghidorah was waiting. Without hesitation, the monsters quickly fought head-on in their first encounter; Godzilla unleashed his heat ray but Ghidorah narrowly dodges it. Grappling the monster, Ghidorah violently tears out Godzilla's spinal pieces before Godzilla manages to regain his ground and tackles Ghidorah. Entangled, Ghidorah bites Godzilla's hand off but Godzilla retaliates by decapitating one of Ghidorah's heads. However, Ghidorah gains the advantage again by levitating Godzilla and dropping him before burying him under rubble. The Bureau attempt to further weaken Ghidorah by freezing it with liquid nitrogen, before covering it with fuel to create a temperature fluctuation. The Bureau succeeds but Godzilla remains incapacitated until Noriko uses her connection to awaken Godzilla. Emerging from the rubble, Godzilla once again prepares to unleash his heat ray against Ghidorah, which had reconnected its head and absorbed some G-Cells. Both monsters unleash their beams, but Ghidorah loses control of its heat rays and is slain by Godzilla.

As the victor, Godzilla is immediately bombarded by the U.S. military as per the plan until the military receives new orders to preserve Godzilla in order to control him using the Resonance Wave Amplifier and Noriko. Unchallenged, Godzilla returned to the ocean without conflict.

=== Other media ===
In 2023, Godzilla has made appearances in the mobile games Fleet of Blue Flames and Godzilla Battle Line.

== Public displays ==
On July 14, 2023, Prior to the premiering of the film, a statue of Godzilla was installed at the Toho Cinemas in Hibiya.

In June 2024, a 2.45 m (245.0 cm; 96.5 in; 2,450.0 mm) tall monument of Godzilla's head and neck was built at Hisaya-Odori Park in central Nagoya, Chūbu to commemorate the 70th anniversary of the Godzilla franchise.

In 2025, a statue of Godzilla was constructed at Fukuoka, Kyushu, this statue was made from straw.

== See also ==
- Godzilla (Shōwa)
- Godzilla (Heisei)
- Shin Godzilla (character)
