= Minami Ichikawa =

Japanese film producer (born 1966)

- 市川 南
- Born: July 22, 1966 (age 60); Tokyo, Japan
- Education: Gakushuin University
- Occupations: Film producer, businessman
- Years active: 1989–present
- Title: Senior Managing Executive Officer of Toho; Head of the Toho Motion Picture Group; Chairman of Toho Cinemas and Toho Marketing; Former President of Toho Pictures

Minami Ichikawa (市川 南, Ichikawa Minami; born July 22, 1966) is a Japanese businessman and film producer. An executive officer at Toho Co., Ltd., Ichikawa is the head of their Motion Picture Group, the Chairman of Toho Cinemas, the director of Toho-Towa and the former President of Toho Pictures.

== Life and career ==
Ichikawa was born in Tokyo on July 22, 1966. After graduating from Gakushuin University, he was employed by Toho in 1989. Ichikawa remained in the advertising department for twelve years and was responsible for about thirty films, including Spirited Away (2001). In 2002, he moved to the Film Coordination Department, where he organized releasing and planning productions. He has worked on the majority of notable Toho films since then, including: Godzilla vs. Biollante (1989), Crying Out Love in the Center of the World (2004), Confessions (2010), 13 Assassins (2010), The Eternal Zero (2013), Our Little Sister (2015), Attack on Titan (2015), Shin Godzilla (2016), Pokémon the Movie: I Choose You! (2017), and Godzilla Minus One (2023).
