= PiXL =

Vision correction procedure

PiXL (Photorefractive Intrastromal Cross-Linking) is a modern non-invasive non-surgical vision correction procedure.

It is performed by applying riboflavin (vitamin B2) eye drops to the cornea and illuminating it with UVA light, which cross-links the collagen fibers within the cornea, making it stronger, changing the shape and improving the patient's vision.

PiXL is a high-fluence corneal collagen cross-linking administered in a customizable pattern and intensity in order to flatten or steepen the cornea through corneal strengthening. The specific application of UVA for each patient takes into account the refractive error and corneal topography. The major components of the therapy are riboflavin injection and UVA irradiation, and the procedure is followed by a course of topical antibiotics and corticosteroids.

PiXL is appropriate for patients with low myopia or hyperopia (mild nearsightedness or farsightedness) as a second line to conventional refractive surgeries (i.e. SMILE, LASIK, PRK, intraocular lens), and for patients who require correction of residual refractive error or refractive regression after conventional refractive surgeries.
