= Pixel (magazine) =

Polish magazine

- Editor: Piotr Mańkowski
- Categories: video games, pop-culture
- Frequency: monthly magazine
- Publisher: Idea Ahead
- Country: Poland
- Language: Polish
- ISSN: 2391-7962
- OCLC: 947150543

Pixel was a Polish magazine founded in 2015 and devoted to video games and pop-culture. It was published monthly by Idea Ahead until 13 January 2023.

The core part of the magazine was composed of review articles, texts about video games history, interviews and reportage. Pixel magazine also contained video game reviews, articles about gaming culture and news from the game industry. The magazine had many regular features. These included Autofire (gaming news), Indykarium (information about indie games), Najlepsza Gra Na Świecie (article about editors selected, the best game of the issue), Sidequest (pop-culture news), Game Study (exhaustive review article about chosen video game) and columns.

The magazine was founded as an informal continuation of Secret Service, another Polish video game magazine. Pixel was strictly connected with an annual event Pixel Heaven, that is organised since 2013. During the festival the game developers are nominated to receive Pixel Awards.
