= Toho International =

American company

Toho International, Inc.
- Type: Subsidiary
- Founded: May 1953; 73 years ago
- Headquarters: Los Angeles, California
- Key people: Kōji Ueda (president)
- Owner: Toho (1953-2023); Toho Global (2023-present)
- Subsidiaries: GKIDS; Fifth Season (25%)
- Website: tohointl.com

Toho International, Inc. is an American company that is a subsidiary of Japanese film company Toho Co., Ltd. Founded in May 1953, the company was initially created to sell films by Toho in North and South America; amongst their first features to export overseas were Seven Samurai and Godzilla (both 1954). Toho International currently manages the licensing, marketing, and distribution of Toho's movies and other products. It is headquartered in Los Angeles.

== History ==
Toho International, Inc. was established in Los Angeles, California, in May 1953 (corporate filing dated July 20, 1953) as a subsidiary of the Japanese film company Toho Co., Ltd. Its original purpose was to handle the sale, distribution, and promotion of Toho films in North and South American markets. Among the earliest titles it exported were Akira Kurosawa's Seven Samurai (1954) and Ishirō Honda's Godzilla (1954), which helped introduce Japanese cinema—and the emerging kaiju genre—to Western audiences. A New York City branch office was opened on February 27, 1960.

During the 1960s and 1970s the company supported theatrical exhibition of Toho films in the United States, including screenings at Toho-operated venues such as the Toho La Brea Theatre in Los Angeles. In addition to film distribution, Toho International managed licensing and merchandising rights for Toho properties and oversaw trademarks and copyrights in the Americas. For a period the subsidiary also engaged in real-estate activities and eventually became largely dormant.

In 2019, as part of Toho's "Toho Vision 2021 Medium-term Management Strategy," the parent company injected ¥15.4 billion ($140 million) into Toho International through a capital increase. The move was intended to revitalize the U.S. subsidiary as a hub for international expansion, particularly the global development of the Godzilla intellectual property and related character businesses.

On January 5, 2023, Toho International announced that it would acquire a 50% stake in Frederator Networks animated series Bee and PuppyCat, Bravest Warriors, and Bravest Warriors spinoff Catbug. The deal would allow new content to be produced based on the properties, while Toho International's parent company Toho would hold distribution rights in Asian territories. On October 1, Toho International was split with the rest of Toho's non-Japanese and Asian subsidiaries into Toho Global. In December 2023, the company released Godzilla Minus One in the United States as its first wide self-distributed release there and announced its intent to acquire a 25% stake in Fifth Season, majority-owned by CJ ENM, for $225 million.

On October 15, 2024, Toho announced that they would acquire distributor GKIDS for an undisclosed amount, of which GKIDS would become a subsidiary of Toho International. The deal was completed in 2025.

== Exported films ==
- Drunken Angel (1948)
- Seven Samurai (1954)
- Godzilla (1954)
- Godzilla Raids Again (1955)
- Half Human (1955)
- The Legend of the White Serpent (1956)
- Rodan (1956)
- Throne of Blood (1957)
- The Mysterians (1957)
- The H-Man (1958)
- Varan the Unbelievable (1958)
- The Hidden Fortress (1958)
- Monkey Sun (1959)
- The Three Treasures (1959)
- Battle in Outer Space (1959)
- The Secret of the Telegian (1960)
- The Bad Sleep Well (1960)
- The Human Vapor (1960)
- The Story of Osaka Castle (1961)
- Mothra (1961)
- The Last War (1961)
- Gorath (1962)
- King Kong vs. Godzilla (1962)
- Matango (1963)
- The Lost World of Sinbad (1963)
- Atragon (1963)
- Mothra vs. Godzilla (1964)
- You Can Succeed, Too (1964)
- Dogora (1964)
- Onibaba (1964)
- Ghidorah, the Three-Headed Monster (1964)
- Frankenstein vs. Baragon (1965)
- Invasion of Astro-Monster (1965)
- The War of the Gargantuas (1966)
- Ebirah, Horror of the Deep (1966)
- King Kong Escapes (1967)
- Son of Godzilla (1967)
- Destroy All Monsters (1968)
- Latitude Zero (1969)
- All Monsters Attack (1969)
- Space Amoeba (1970)
- Godzilla vs. Hedorah (1971)
- Godzilla vs. Gigan (1972)
- Godzilla vs. Megalon (1973)
- Godzilla vs. Mechagodzilla (1974)
- Prophecies of Nostradamus (1974)
- ESPY (1974)
- Terror of Mechagodzilla (1975)
- The War in Space (1977)
- The Mystery of Mamo (1978)
- Kagemusha (1980)
- Bye-Bye Jupiter (1984)
- The Return of Godzilla (1984)
- Princess from the Moon (1987)
- Gunhed (1989)
- Godzilla vs. Biollante (1989)
- Godzilla vs. King Ghidorah (1991)
- Godzilla vs. Mothra (1992)
- Godzilla vs. Mechagodzilla II (1993)
- Orochi, the Eight-Headed Dragon (1994)
- Godzilla vs. SpaceGodzilla (1994)
- Godzilla vs. Destoroyah (1995)
- Rebirth of Mothra (1996)
- Rebirth of Mothra II (1997)
- Rebirth of Mothra III (1998)
- Godzilla 2000: Millennium (1999)
- Godzilla vs. Megaguirus (2000)
- Godzilla, Mothra and King Ghidorah: Giant Monsters All-Out Attack (2001)
- Godzilla Against Mechagodzilla (2002)
- Godzilla: Tokyo S.O.S. (2003)
- Godzilla: Final Wars (2004)
- Shin Godzilla (2016)
- Godzilla Minus One (2023)
- My Hero Academia: You're Next (2024)

=== Anime ===
- Psycho-Pass (2012)
- Majestic Prince (2013)
  - Galactic Armored Fleet Majestic Prince: Wings to the Future (2016)
  - Galactic Armored Fleet Majestic Prince: Genetic Awakening (2016)
- Fantasista Doll (2013)
- Meganebu! (2013)
- Yowamushi Pedal (2013)
- Engaged to the Unidentified (2014)
- One Week Friends (2014)
- Haikyū!! (2014)
- Ao Haru Ride (2014)
- Blood Blockade Battlefront (2015)
- Chaos Dragon (2015)
- Monster Musume (2015)
- Himouto! Umaru-chan (2015)
  - Himouto! Umaru-chan R (2017)
- Grimgar of Fantasy and Ash (2016)
- She and Her Cat: Everything Flows (2016)
- My Hero Academia (2016)
- Three Leaves, Three Colors (2016)
- Orange (2016)
- Touken Ranbu: Hanamaru (2016)
  - Zoku Touken Ranbu: Hanamaru (2018)
  - Toku Touken Ranbu: Hanamaru ~Setsugetsuka~ (2022)
- Little Witch Academia (2017)
- Godzilla: Planet of the Monsters (2017)
- Sakura Quest (2017)
- Land of the Lustrous (2017)
- Teasing Master Takagi-san (2018)
- Uma Musume: Pretty Derby (2018)
- Hanebado! (2018)
- Godzilla: City on the Edge of Battle (2018)
- Run with the Wind (2018)
- Anima Yell! (2018)
- FLCL Progressive (2018)
- FLCL Alternative (2018)
- Godzilla: The Planet Eater (2018)
- Fairy Gone (2019)
- Dr. Stone (2019)
- Business Fish (2019)
- Beastars (2019)
- Azur Lane (2019)
- Drifting Dragons (2020)
- BNA: Brand New Animal (2020)
- Great Pretender (2020)
- Dorohedoro (2020)
- Jujutsu Kaisen (2020)
- Mushoku Tensei (2021)
- Seven Knights (2021)
- Godzilla Singular Point (2021)
- Spy × Family (2022)
- The Angel Next Door Spoils Me Rotten (2023)
- Chibi Godzilla Raids Again (2023)
- Frieren: Beyond Journey's End (2023)
- The Apothecary Diaries (2023)
- Bucchigiri?! (2024)
- Kaiju No. 8 (2024)
- Snowball Earth (2026)
- Though I Am an Inept Villainess (2026)
