= Suki Dakara =

Suki Dakara may refer to:

- "Suki Dakara" (Becky song)
- "Suki Dakara" (Beni song)
