= 31st Japan Academy Film Prize =

Japanese film awards in 2008

- Date: February 15, 2008
- Site: Grand Prince Hotel New Takanawa, Tokyo, Japan
- Hosted by: Hiroshi Sekiguchi; Miki Nakatani

Highlights
- Most nominations: Tokyo Tower: Mom and Me, and Sometimes Dad (13); Always Zoku Sanchōme no Yūhi (12); I Just Didn't Do It (11)

The 31st Japan Academy Film Prize (第31回日本アカデミー賞) is the 31st edition of the Japan Academy Film Prize, an award presented by the Nippon Academy-Sho Association to award excellence in filmmaking. It awarded the best films of 2007 and it took place on February 15, 2008, at the Grand Prince Hotel New Takanawa in Tokyo, Japan.

== Nominees ==
=== Awards ===
Picture of the Year	Animation of the Year
Tokyo Tower: Mom and Me, and Sometimes Dad; Always Zoku Sanchōme no Yūhi; Kisaragi; I Just Didn't Do It; Bizan	Tekkonkinkreet; Evangelion: 1.0 You Are (Not) Alone; Summer Days with Coo; Piano no Mori; Detective Conan: Jolly Roger in the Deep Azure
Director of the Year	Screenplay of the Year
Joji Matsuoka – Tokyo Tower: Mom and Me, and Sometimes Dad; Isshin Inudo – Bizan; Yūichi Satō – Kisaragi; Masayuki Suo – I Just Didn't Do It; Takashi Yamazaki – Always Zoku Sanchōme no Yūhi	Suzuki Matsuo – Tokyo Tower: Mom and Me, and Sometimes Dad; Kankurō Kudō – Maiko Haaaan!!!; Masayuki Suo – I Just Didn't Do It; Takashi Yamazaki and Ryōta Kosawa – Always Zoku Sanchōme no Yūhi
Outstanding Performance by an Actor in a Leading Role	Outstanding Performance by an Actress in a Leading Role
Hidetaka Yoshioka – Always Zoku Sanchōme no Yūhi; Sadao Abe – Maiko Haaaan!!!; Joe Odagiri – Tokyo Tower: Mom and Me, and Sometimes Dad; Ryo Kase – I Just Didn't Do It; Kōji Yakusho – Zou no Senaka	Kirin Kiki – Tokyo Tower: Mom and Me, and Sometimes Dad; Shinobu Terajima – Ai no Rukeichi; Miki Nakatani – Jigyaku no Uta; Yukie Nakama – Oh! Oku; Rie Miyazawa – Orion-za Kara no Shōkaijō
Outstanding Performance by an Actor in a Supporting Role	Outstanding Performance by an Actress in a Supporting Role
Kaoru Kobayashi – Tokyo Tower: Mom and Me, and Sometimes Dad; Akira Emoto – Three for the Road; Teruyuki Kagawa – Kisaragi; Shinichi Tsutsumi – Always Zoku Sanchōme no Yūhi and Maiko Haaaan!!!	Masako Motai – I Just Didn't Do It; Maki Horikita – Always Zoku Sanchōme no Yūhi; Takako Matsu – Tokyo Tower: Mom and Me, and Sometimes Dad; Nobuko Miyamoto – Bizan; Hiroko Yakushimaru – Always Zoku Sanchōme no Yūhi
[Outstanding Achievement in Music	Outstanding Achievement in Cinematography
Michiru Ōshima – Bizan; Tadashi Ueda – Tokyo Tower: Mom and Me, and Sometimes Dad; Naoki Satō – Always Zoku Sanchōme no Yūhi; Ringo Sheena – Sakuran; Yoshikazu Suo – I Just Didn't Do It	Takahiro Tsutai – Bizan; Norimichi Kasamatsu – Tokyo Tower: Mom and Me, and Sometimes Dad; Naoki Kayano – I Just Didn't Do It; Daisaku Kimura – Tsukigami; Kōzō Shibasaki – Always Zoku Sanchōme no Yūhi
Outstanding Achievement in Lighting Direction	Outstanding Achievement in Art Direction
Yoshitake Hikita – Bizan; Kenichi Mizuno – Tokyo Tower: Mom and Me, and Sometimes Dad; Tatsuya Osada – I Just Didn't Do It; Takashi Sugimito – Tsukigami; Kenichi Mizuno – Always Zoku Sanchōme no Yūhi	Kyōko Heya – I Just Didn't Do It; Namiko Iwaki – Sakuran; Anri Joujou – Always Zoku Sanchōme no Yūhi; Mitsuo Harada – Tokyo Tower: Mom and Me, and Sometimes Dad; Takashi Yoshida – Oh! Oku
Outstanding Achievement in Sound Recording	Outstanding Achievement in Film Editing
Hitoshi Tsurumaki – Always Zoku Sanchōme no Yūhi; Shigeru Abe, Hiromichi Kōri, Kiyoshi Yoneyama – I Just Didn't Do It; Kiyoshi Kakizawa – Tokyo Tower: Mom and Me, and Sometimes Dad; Junichi Shima – Bizan; Nobuhiko Matsukage – Tsukigami	Junichi Kikuchi – I Just Didn't Do It; Sōichi Ueno – Bizan; Seigo Hirasawa – Maiko Haaaan!!!; Shinichi Fushima – Tokyo Tower: Mom and Me, and Sometimes Dad; Ryūji Miyajima – Always Zoku Sanchōme no Yūhi
Outstanding Foreign Language Film	Newcomer of the Year
Letters from Iwo Jima; Dreamgirls; Babel; Hairspray; The Bourne Ultimatum	Eiji Wentz – GeGeGe no Kitarō; Kento Hayashi – Battery; Haruma Miura – Koizora; Yui Aragaki – Koizora; Yayako Uchida – Tokyo Tower: Mom and Me, and Sometimes Dad; Kaho – A Gentle Breeze in the Village; Kie Kitano – Kōfuku na Shokutaku
Special Award from the Association	Special Award from the Chairman
Kenji Shibasaki (Sound Effect)	Hitoshi Ueki (Actor); Kei Kumai (Director)
Popularity Award	
Kisaragi (Production Category); Yui Aragaki – Koizora (Actor Category)	
