= Kimi ni Todoke =

Japanese manga series

- Kimi ni Todoke: From Me to You
- First tankōbon volume cover, featuring Sawako Kuronuma (left) and Shōta Kazehaya (right)

君に届け (Kimi ni Todoke)
- Genre: Coming-of-age; Romantic comedy; Slice of life
- Manga
- Written by: Karuho Shiina
- Published by: Shueisha
- English publisher: NA: Viz Media
- Imprint: Margaret Comics
- Magazine: Bessatsu Margaret
- Original run: December 13, 2005 – November 13, 2017
- Volumes: 30
- Light novel
- Written by: Yoshimoto Nara
- Illustrated by: Karuho Shiina
- Published by: Shueisha
- Imprint: Cobalt
- Original run: August 1, 2007 – December 25, 2015
- Volumes: 16
- Light novel

Kimi ni Todoke: Ashita ni Nareba
- Written by: Kanae Shimokawa
- Illustrated by: Karuho Shiina
- Published by: Shueisha
- Magazine: Bessatsu Margaret
- Published: September 11, 2009
- Anime television series
- Directed by: Hiro Kaburaki (S1–2); Kenichi Matsuzawa (S3)
- Produced by: Toshio Nakatani; Hiroyuki Okino; Manabu Tamura; George Wada
- Written by: Tomoko Konparu
- Music by: S.E.N.S.
- Studio: Production I.G
- Licensed by: NA: NIS America; Netflix (streaming rights)
- Original network: NTV (S1–2); Netflix (S3)
- Original run: October 6, 2009 – August 1, 2024
- Episodes: 43
- Light novel
- Written by: Kanako Shirai
- Illustrated by: Karuho Shiina
- Published by: Shueisha
- Imprint: Mirai Bunko
- Original run: March 1, 2011 – June 5, 2015
- Volumes: 13
- Manga

Kimi ni Todoke: From Me to You: Soulmate
- Written by: Karuho Shiina
- Published by: Shueisha
- English publisher: NA: Viz Media
- Magazine: Bessatsu Margaret
- Original run: April 13, 2018 – May 13, 2022
- Volumes: 3
- Television drama
- Directed by: Takehiko Shinjō; Takeo Kikuchi
- Written by: Hayato Miyamoto
- Studio: TV Tokyo
- Licensed by: Netflix
- Original run: March 30, 2023
- Episodes: 12
- Live-action film
- Kimi ni Todoke (2010)
- icon

Kimi ni Todoke: From Me to You (Japanese: 君に届け, Hepburn: Kimi ni Todoke) is a Japanese manga series written and illustrated by Karuho Shiina. It was published by Shueisha in Bessatsu Margaret from 2005 to 2017 and collected in 30 tankōbon volumes. The story follows Sawako Kuronuma, a high school girl misunderstood for her eerie appearance, as she navigates friendships and love with the help of her kind classmate Shōta Kazehaya.

An anime television series adaptation of Kimi ni Todoke by Production I.G aired in Japan from October 2009 to March 2010 for 25 episodes. The second season of the anime aired in Japan from January to March 2011, and lasted for 12 episodes. A live action film adaptation was released in 2010 starring Mikako Tabe and Haruma Miura. A live-action series produced by TV Tokyo and Netflix premiered in March 2023. A third season of the anime series began streaming worldwide on Netflix in August 2024.

More than 33 million copies of the series were in print, which makes it one of the best-selling manga. In 2008, it won the Best Shōjo Manga award in the 32nd Annual Kodansha Manga Award. The series was also nominated for the first Manga Taisho awards in 2008.

== Plot ==
The story takes place in Hokkaido. 15-year-old high school freshman Sawako Kuronuma—dubbed Sadako by her classmates for her resemblance to the character from The Ring—has always been feared and misunderstood because of her appearance. Rumors around school report that she can see ghosts and curse people. However, despite her ominous appearance, she is actually a sweet and unassuming girl who only longs to be helpful. She has been shunned for so long that the idea of making friends has become foreign to her. When a popular boy, Kazehaya, begins talking with her, everything changes. She finds herself in a new world, making new friends and talking to different people, and she cannot thank Kazehaya enough for giving her these opportunities. Slowly, but surely, a sweet love blossoms between the two as they overcome circumstances and obstacles standing in their way.

== Media ==
=== Manga ===
Written and illustrated by Karuho Shiina, Kimi ni Todoke was first published as a one-shot in Shueisha's shōjo manga magazine Bessatsu Margaret on August 11, 2005, and planned to be compiled in her previous work, Crazy For You. Shiina decided to expand the story and make it into a full series.^{[ch. 1:author's note]} The manga started in the January 2006 issue of Bessatsu Margaret, released on December 13, 2005. The manga was put on hiatus in February 2009, due to Shiina's childbirth, and resumed in September of that same year. The manga finished on November 13, 2017. Shueisha collected its chapters in 30 tankōbon' volumes, released from May 25, 2006, to March 23, 2018.

An irregularly published spin-off/sequel manga series, titled Kimi ni Todoke: From Me to You: Soulmate (君に届け 番外編～運命の人～, Kimi ni Todoke Bangaihen: Unmei no Hito) (also a spin-off/sequel of Shiina's earlier manga Crazy for You), was serialized in Bessatsu Margaret from April 13, 2018, to May 13, 2022, and collected into three volumes.

The series was licensed by Viz Media for an English-language North American release. The sequel manga was also licensed by Viz Media.

=== Light novels ===
Kimi ni Todoke has been adapted into two series of light novels in Japan released by Shueisha, one under their Cobalt imprint and one under their newer Mirai Bunko imprint. Sixteen volumes have been released in the Cobalt imprint series; the first was released on August 1, 2007, and the last on December 25, 2015. They were written by Kanae Shimokawa, who also novelized the Nana movie and Yūkan Club.^{[ch. 26:author note#2]} Thirteen volumes of the Mirai Bunko version have been released; the first on March 1, 2011, and the last on June 5, 2015. They were written by Kanako Shirai. Both series were illustrated by the author of the original, Karuho Shiina.

A separate volume, Kimi ni Todoke: Ashita ni Nareba (君に届け ~明日になれば~, Kimi ni Todoke: When Tomorrow Comes), also by Kanae Shimokawa, was released on September 11, 2009. The volume took the place of the manga serialization in Bessatsu Margaret magazine while Karuho Shiina took a break due to her pregnancy in 2009; it contains the story of Kazehaya and Sawako's first meeting, before the events of the manga.

=== Anime ===
The first season of the Kimi ni Todoke anime adaptation aired between October 2009 and March 2010. A second season was announced in the November 2010 issue of Betsuma magazine. The second season aired in Japan on NTV from January to March 2011. Both seasons of the anime were produced by Production I.G. and directed by Hiro Kaburaki. The music was done by S.E.N.S. Project, with the opening sung by Tomofumi Tanizawa and the ending by Chara. In September 2023, a third season was announced, with Production I.G returning to animate the season and Kenichi Matsuzawa replacing Hiro Kaburaki as director. It began streaming worldwide on Netflix in August 2024. The opening theme song is "et cetera" performed by imase.

NIS America announced at Anime Expo 2011 that they have licensed the first season of Kimi ni Todoke. They released the subtitled first season on DVD/Blu-ray on January 10 and April 10, 2012, and released the second season on July 3 of the same year. NIS America later re-released the series on February 4, 2014. The North American license was passed to Funimation on April 15, 2021, and subsequently to Netflix on January 1, 2023, which began streaming the first two seasons with an English dub on February 1, 2024.

=== Video games ===
Bandai Namco Games released a game for the Nintendo DS in Japan based upon the series on October 16, 2009, entitled Kimi ni Todoke ~Sodateru Omoi~ (君に届け ~育てる想い~). A second Nintendo DS game, also from Bandai Namco, was released on April 7, 2011, under the title Kimi ni Todoke ~Tsutaeru Kimochi~ (君に届け〜伝えるキモチ〜).

=== Live-action film ===
The February 2010 issue of Bessatsu Margaret (released in January 2010), announced that a live-action film adaptation of the series had been approved. Mikako Tabe and Haruma Miura starred in the film, released in Japanese theatres on September 25, 2010, and directed by Naoto Kumazawa. The movie was released on Blu-ray and DVD on March 11, 2011.

=== Live-action series ===
In September 2022, a live-action television series was announced. The series is a joint production by TV Tokyo and Netflix, and is directed by Takehiko Shinjō and Takeo Kikuchi, with Hayato Miyamoto handling series composition. The series premiered on March 30, 2023, with 12 episodes.

== Reception ==
=== Manga ===
Oricon Japanese comic rankings
Volume No.	Peak rank	Notes	Refs
4	2		
5	1		
6	2		
7	1		
8	1		
9	1		
10	1		
11	1		
12	1		
13	1		
14	1		
15	1		
16	1		
17	1	6 weeks	
18	1	7 weeks	
19	1	4 weeks	
20	1	6 weeks	

Volumes of the series commonly ranked in listings of top selling manga in Japan. All the volumes have been translated and published in English.

At the debut of the twelfth volume, all twelve of the current volumes were ranked on Oricon's list of 100 best-selling manga for the week. According to Anime News Network, Kimi ni Todoke is now the "shōjo manga with the most #1 books and the most books to sell one million copies since 2008" in Japan. The series was the third best-selling manga series in Japan in 2010, with 6,572,813 copies sold. As of the release of the 16th volume in May 2012, Kimi ni Todoke had reached a total of over 20 million copies in print. In 2013, Kimi ni Todoke sold over 3.4 million copies, placing 11th on Oricon's best selling manga series for that year. By 2019, 33 million copies of the series were in print.

Anime News Network called the series "hands down one of the best new English-translated manga series of 2009" and suggested that everyone, not just shōjo manga fans, read the series. The first volume of the series was listed as a "Hot Fall Graphic Novel" for libraries in the teen section by YALSA. The series was also listed in the Best Comics for Teens category of the School Library Journal's Best Comics for Kids in 2009 list. Kimi ni Todoke has also been included on the American Library Association's list of 2010 Great Graphic Novels for Teens.

=== Anime ===
Many of the first season volumes have sold well enough in the first week of release to be ranked on the weekly Oricon Sales Chart for Japan's Animation DVDs.

Volume #	Sales Period	Copies	Ranking
2	January 25–31, 2010	7,449	19th
3	February 22–28, 2010	7,557	18th
5	April 19–26, 2010	7,136	17th
6	May 24–30, 2010	7,035	12th
7	June 21–27, 2010	6,613	14th
8	July 12–18, 2010	6,125	20th

The second season of the anime was number one in a poll of Dengeki Online readers as their most anticipated anime series debuting in January 2011. Anime News Network reviewer Carl Kimlinger gave the second season 4 1/2 out of 5 stars, saying, "This remains the finest series of its type since Lovely Complex, and the most beautiful since...well, I don't know when." Japanese viewers voted it the most enjoyable anime of the Winter 2011 season during a poll taken just before the season ended.

=== Live-action ===
According to Oricon, the series was listed as 3rd on a list of titles that Japanese readers wanted a drama adaptation for. The live action movie adaptation opened at second place in Kogyo Tsushinsha's box office chart during its first week in Japanese theaters. The movie was number 3 on Box Office Mojo's chart during its first two days, earning the equivalent to US$2,770,613 on 285 screens.

== Notes on works cited ==
- "Ch." and "Vol." are the shortened forms for chapter and volume and refer to a chapter or volume number of the Kimi ni Todoke manga by Karuho Shiina. The original Japanese version is published by Shueisha and the English translation is published by Viz Media.
