= Becky (television personality) =

Japanese entertainer (born 1984)

- ベッキー
- Born: Rebecca Eri Rabone; 6 March 1984 (age 42); Kanagawa Prefecture, Japan
- Other names: Becky♪♯ (ベッキー♪♯, Bekkī)
- Education: Asia University (BBA)
- Occupations: Singer; Actress
- Years active: 1998–present
- Agent: GATE
- Spouse: Yasuyuki Kataoka (m. 2019)
- Children: 2
- Website: www.becky.ne.jp

Rebecca Eri Rabone (レベッカ・英里・レイボーン, Rebekka Eri Reibōn; born 6 March 1984), known as Becky (ベッキー, Bekkī), is a Japanese television personality, actress, and singer. Since 2009, she has recorded music under the stage name Becky♪♯.

== Early life and education ==
Becky was born in Kanagawa Prefecture to a Japanese mother and an English father, Simon Rabone. She has one younger sister, dancer Jessica "JJ" Rabone. Until at least 2011, Becky held dual citizenship status in both Japan and the United Kingdom. She graduated from Tokyo's Asia University with a degree in business administration on 15 March 2006.

Although The Japan Times previously erroneously reported her full name as "Rebecca Eri Ray Vaughan", Australian airline Jetstar Airways, having used her in advertisements and promotions aimed towards Japanese audiences, gives her full name as being "Rebecca-Eri Rabone", this surname matching that used by her father and sister; the error arises from the fact that 'Rabone' and 'Ray Vaughan' would be spelled the same way in Japanese.

== Career ==
She debuted as a regular on the popular children's show Oha-Suta in 1999 reading out the English names of various Pokémon characters in a section of the show called Pokémon: The World. She became a popular mascot of the show, and eventually started landing spots on various Japanese variety shows. On television, she has also appeared in numerous commercials and has lent her voice to the characters of many anime shorts and movies.

In January 2016, Becky's reputation as Japan's most popular female personality took a hit after Japanese tabloid Shūkan Bunshun revealed that she had an affair with musician Enon Kawatani who at the time was married. Following the scandal, Kawatani announced that he officially divorced his wife. In order to appease the public backlash and as a condition for her comeback to show business in Japan, Becky tried to officially apologize to Kawatani's wife. However, having no direct channel to her, Becky contacted the Shūkan Bunshun's editorial department instead. Shukan Bunshun published the full contents of Becky's letter at the end of April 2016. The letter acknowledged her affair yet also implied that she had not seen Kawatani since the scandal broke and that she no longer had feelings for him. As a result of her apologies, Becky was to make her comeback with an appearance on TBS. In her first appearance back on TV, she appeared on Full Chorus – Music is Full Chorus on the cable channel BS Skyperfect TV.

== Personal life ==
On 13 February 2019, Becky announced that she had married Yomiuri Giants coach Yasuyuki Kataoka.

On 17 March 2020 the couple announced the birth of their first child, and their second child was born on 20 August 2021.

== Filmography ==
=== Variety shows ===
Becky is currently a regular panelist on the following programs:

- Pokémon Sunday on TX
- Hanamaru Market on TBS
- Gekko Ongaku-dan on TBS
- Tensai! Shimura Zoo on NTV
- Kiyoshi to Kono Yoru on NHK
- Watashi no Kimochi on NHK
- Nakai Masahiro no kin'yōbi no Sma-tachi e on TBS
- Tabegoro Manma! on NTV
- Pittanko Kankan on TBS as a semi-regular
- Sekai no Hate Made Itte-Q! on NTV (2007-2016)
- Nazotoki Battle TORE! on NTV

=== Television series ===
- Churasan (2001)
- Ultraman Cosmos (2001)
- Tsūhan Man (2002)
- Boku no Mahou Tsukai (2003)
- Blue Moshiku wa Blue (2003)
- Stand Up!! (2003)
- Ace o Nerae! (2004)
- Hikeshiya Komachi (2004)
- Rondo (2006)
- Yaoh (2006, in episode three)
- Toritsu Mizusho! (2006)
- Taiyou no Uta (2006)
- Detective Conan (2006)
- Anna-san no Omame (2006)
- Walkers (2006)
- Nodame Cantabile Special Lesson (Europe Special) (2008)
- Love Village (2022), Host
- Unbound (2025), Take

=== Film ===
- Noel (2003)
- Makoto (2005)
- Nodame Cantabile The Movie I (2009) – Tanya Vishnyova
- Nodame Cantabile The Movie II (2010) – Tanya Vishnyova
- Eight Ranger (2012) Momoko Kitoh
- The Last Chance: Diary of Comedians (2013) – Becky
- Eight Ranger 2 (2014) – Momoko Kitoh
- JK Ninja Girls (2017)
- A Gambler's Odyssey 2020 (2019)
- First Love (2019), Julie
- Agito: Psychic War (2026)

=== Japanese dub ===
Live-action

- Son of the Mask (2005), Tonya Avery (Traylor Howard)
- Teenage Mutant Ninja Turtles (2014), April O'Neil (Megan Fox)
- The Mummy (2017), Ahmanet (Sofia Boutella)

Animation

- Donkey Kong Country (1999), Dixie Kong
- Oswald (2001), Daisy
- The Simpsons Movie (2007), Lisa Simpson (Theatrical release)
- Monsters vs. Aliens (2009), Susan Murphy/Ginormica

== Discography ==
In addition to her work as an actress and model, Becky has also had several musical releases. Beginning in late 2009, Becky began recording under the name "Becky♪♯" (ベッキー♪♯, Bekkī), and her first single under EMI Music Japan debuted in the top 10 of the Oricon's Daily and Weekly Charts.

=== Albums ===
Title	Release date
Kokoro no Hoshi (心の星)	24 February 2010
Kaze to Melody (風とメロディー, Kaze to Merodī)	13 July 2011

=== Singles ===
Stage name	Title	Release date	Notes	Album
Becky	"Sora Tobu Pokémon Kids" ( そらとぶポケモンキッズ, Sora Tobu Pokémon Kizzu)	17 July 1999		N/A
Becky	"Densetsu no Starfy" ( 伝説のスタフィー, Densetsu no Sutafī)	4 September 2002	Densetsu no Starfy theme	N/A
Becky	"Sarara" ( さらら)	4 December 2002		N/A
Becky	"Horiken Size II" ( ホリケンサイズII, Horiken Saizu II)	12 March 2003		N/A
Becky	"Hello! Thank You!" ( ハロー！サンキュー！, Harō! Sankyū!)	29 April 2005	Pokémon The Park theme	N/A
Becky	"Himawari" ( 向日葵)	22 February 2006		N/A
Becky♪♯	"Kokoro Komete" ( 心こめて)	2 December 2009	B-side serves as Crayon Shin-chan theme	Kokoro no Hoshi
Becky♪♯	"Suki Dakara" ( 好きだから)	3 February 2010		Kokoro no Hoshi
Becky♪♯	"Emerald" ( エメラルド, Emerarudo)	20 July 2010	How to Train Your Dragon Japanese theme	Kaze to Melody
Becky♪♯	"Fuyusora no Love Song" ( 冬空のLove Song)	1 December 2010	Happy Music theme	Kaze to Melody
Goocky (グッキー, Gukkī)	"Good Lucky!!!!!"	2 March 2011	Universal Studios Japan 10th anniversary theme, Collaboration with Greeeen	Kaze to Melody
Becky♪♯	"Kaze no Shirabe" ( 風のしらべ)	15 June 2011	Universal Studios Japan 10th anniversary summer TV commercial song	Kaze to Melody
Becky♪♯	"Yaruki Switch" ( ヤルキスイッチ, Yaruki Suitchi)	27 June 2012	Onegai! Ranking July ending theme	TBA
Becky♪♯	"My Friend ~Arigato~" (MY FRIEND ～ありがとう～, MY FRIEND ~Arigatō~)	12 December 2012	B-side used for "Vis" advertisement campaign	TBA

=== Other appearances ===
- Act4 (8 December 2004)
  - Features the songs "Himawari", "Deco Boco", and "Chocorate" off of her single "Himawari"
- Tribute to Avril Lavigne: Master's Collection (25 October 2006)
  - Track 10: "Sk8er Boi"
- Yesterday Once More: Tribute to the Carpenters
  - Track 6: "Sing"

== Awards ==
Year	Award	Category	Work(s)	Result	Ref.
2020	45th Hochi Film Awards	Best Supporting Actress	First Love	Nominated	
2021	75th Mainichi Film Awards	Best Supporting Actress	First Love	Nominated	
2021	63rd Blue Ribbon Awards	Best Supporting Actress	First Love	Nominated	
