= Haru (actress) =

Japanese actress (born 1991)

- 波瑠
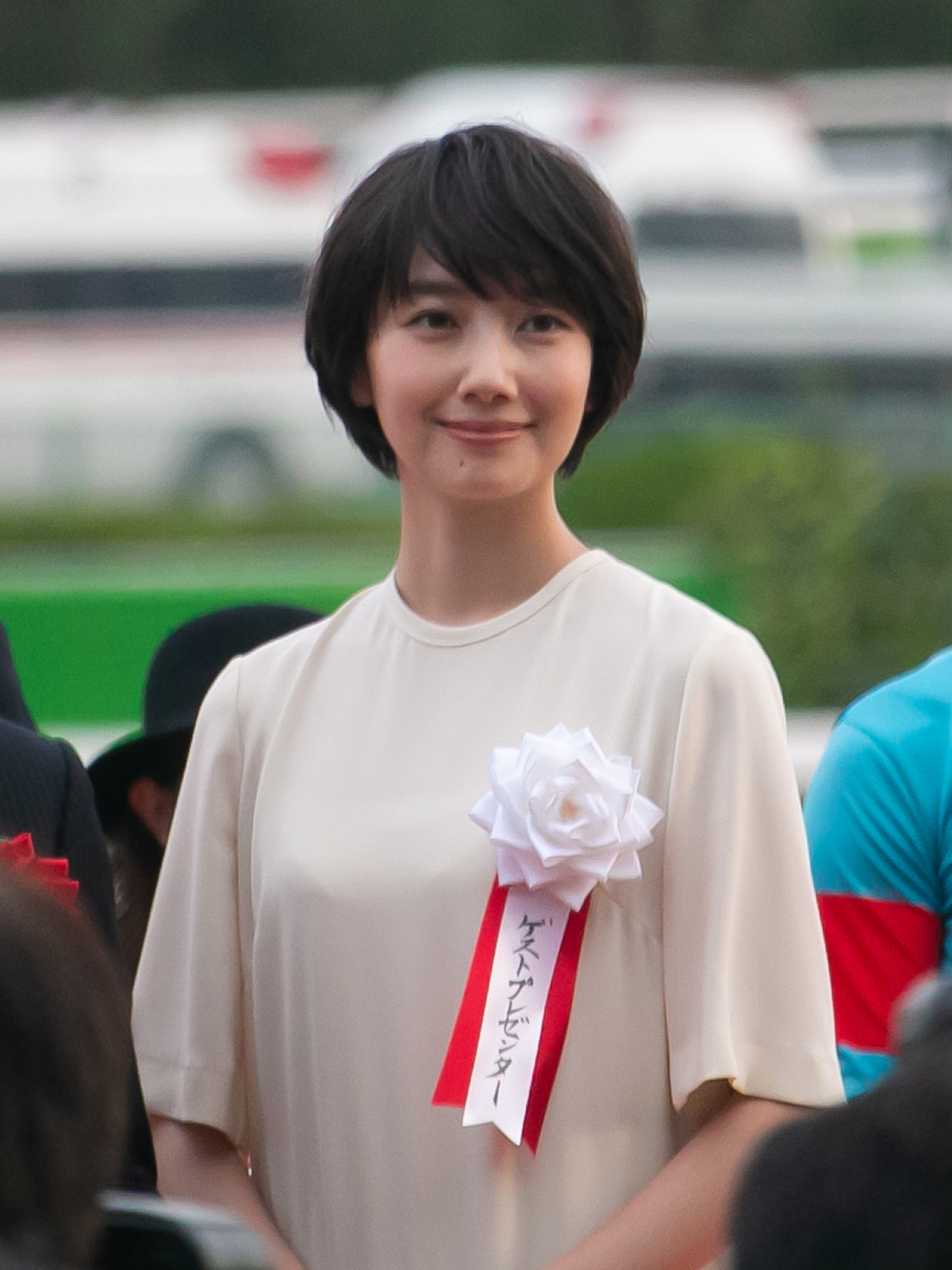
- Haru in 2018
- Born: June 17, 1991 (age 34); Adachi, Tokyo, Japan
- Occupation: Actress
- Years active: 2004–present
- Agent(s): MU, Inc.
- Height: 164 cm (5 ft 5 in)
- Spouse: Mahiro Takasugi (m. 2025)

Haru (波瑠, Haru; born June 17, 1991) is a Japanese actress. She is known for the film Koizora (2007), Maria-sama ga Miteru (2010), the TV drama Asa ga Kita (2015-2016), and for co-hosting of the TBS talk show A-Studio.

== Career ==
In 2004, at the age of 13, Haru entered the entertainment industry after being scouted by Hori Agency. She made her screen acting debut in the 2006 WOWOW television drama Taigan no Kanojo. In 2007, she debuted as an exclusive model for the fashion magazine Seventeen.

She released her first single, titled "I Miss You/Message: Asu no Boku e," on April 16, 2008. This song was used as the ending theme in the TBS variety show Kami Summers. In 2010 she appeared in a lead role for the first time in the live-action film Maria-sama ga Miteru.

A 2012 NTT DoCoMo TV commercial raised her public profile, and from 2012 to 2015 she was an exclusive model for the fashion magazine non-no. In March 2015 she was cast as lead character in the 93rd NHK Asadora Asa ga Kita.

On January 1, 2018, she opened her Instagram account. She later uploaded a video wishing her fans a "Happy New Year."

On December 25, 2024, she announced that she would be leaving Hori Agency after 19 years at the end of the year.

== Personal life ==
On December 23, 2025, Haru and actor Mahiro Takasugi announced through their respective official social media accounts that they had gotten married in early December. Their wedding ceremony was attended by their families and close friends.

== Appearances ==
=== TV dramas ===
- Taigan no Kanojo (2006)
- 14-sai no Haha (2006), Haru Ueda
- Watashitachi no Kyōkasho Episode 1, 9 (2007), Sakura Kumazawa
- Sumire 16 sai!! (2008), Akebi Kiryu
- Shibatora Episode 1 (2008), Rumi
- Koizora (2008), Saki
- 33-pun Tantei Episode 3 (2008)
- Room of King Episode 3 (2008), Chīko
- Ghost Town no Hana (2009), Rina Akiyama
- Gekai Hatomura Shūgorō 5 (2009), Marina Asaoka
- Orthros no Inu (2009), Kana Shirokawa
- Shinzanmono Episode 4 (2010), Kanae Sawamura
- Gold Episode 1-2 (2010), Ryōko Shiina
- Tōbō Bengoshi Episode 6 (2010, Nozomi Hashimoto
- Kurohyō Ryū ga Gotoku Shinshō (2010), Saki Kudō
- Young Black Jack (2011)
- Tantei X Kara no Chōsenjō! Special (2011), Mitsuko Enoki
- Switch Girl!! (2011), Reika Jōgasaki
- Kazoku ga Kazoku de Aru Tameni (2012), Midori Saeki
- Ekiben Hitori Tabi: Tōhoku Hen (2012), Nana Ozaki
- Legal High Episode 1 (2012), Tomoko Shimamura
- Kekkon Dōsōkai: Seaside Love (2012), Renka Natsume
- Higashino Keigo Mysteries Episode 8 (2012), Yōko Saeki
- Monsters Episode 4 (2012), Kayo Suzuki
- Pillow Talk: Bed no Shiwaku Episode 8 (2012), Aoi
- Aibō Season 11, Episode 11 (2013), Akane Niōgō
- Shotenin Michiru no Mi no Ue Banashi (2013), Chiaki Furukawa
- Tabemonogatari Kanojo no Kondate Chō Episode 9-10 (2013), Mai Yamane
- Kasukana Kanojo Episode 7 (2013), Kasumi Hirota
- Kyūmei Byōtō 24-ji Season 5 (2013), Kaon Kunitomo
- Inemuri Sensei (2013), Masako
- Nōkon Kid: Bokura no Game Shi (2013), Fumi Takano
- Yorozu Uranai Dokoro Onmyōya e Yōkoso Episode 3 (2013), Natsuo Miyauchi
- Shokubutsu Danshi Berandā (2013)
- Kounotori no Yurikago: Akachan Post no 6-nen Kan to Sukuwareta 92 no Inochi no Mirai (2013), Ryōko Yasuda
- Matching Love (2013), Haruka Iwata
- Kindaichi Shōnen no Jikenbo Gokumon Juku Satsujin Jiken (2014), Akiko Hama
- Hitojichi no Rōdokukai (2014), Hitomi Hirasawa/Sakiko Hirasawa
- Border Keishichō Sōsa Ikka Satsujinhan Sōsa Dai-4 Gakari (2014), Mika Higa
- Osoroshi: Mishimaya Henchō Hyaku Monogatari (2014), Ochika
- Gomenne Seishun! (2014), Yūko Hachiya
- Ubasute (Hokkaido Television Broadcasting, 2014), Diana
- Ōedo Sōsamō 2015: Onmitsu Dōshin, Aku o Kiru! (2015), Sanae Tanuma
- Hula Girl to Inu no Choko (2015), Kasumi Takezawa
- Asadora Asa ga Kita (2015), Asa Shiraoka
- Sekai Ichi Muzukashii Koi (2016), Misaki Shibayama
- The Kitazawas: We Mind Our Own Business (2018), Chiaki Kitazawa
- Mikaiketsu no Onna: Keishichou Bunsho Sousakan (2018), Tomo Yashiro
- Water Margin (2026), Yang Zhi's wife

=== Films ===
- Dakara Watashi o Suwarasete. Tūkin Densha de Suwaru Gijutsu! (2006), Ai
- The Graduates (2007), Kaoru Yoshii
- Koizora (2007), Aya
- Koi no Pororon (2007), Kaho
- Chī-chan wa Yūkyū no Mukou (2008), Yūko Hayashida
- Yūbae Shōjo "Asakusa no Shimai" (2008)
- Real Onigokko (2008), Haru Satō
- Rock'n Roll Diet! (2008), Narumi Eguchi
- Tenshi no Ita Okujō (2008), Mizuki Kawashiro
- Ikemen Bank The Movie (2009), Yuri Yamamura
- Guardian Angel (2009), Asami Watanabe
- Yamagata Scream (2009), Munae Haraizen
- Onna no Ko Monogatari (2009), Kimiko(Highschool Girl)
- Bushido Sixteen (2010), Midoriko Nishiogi
- Soft Boy (2010), Kusanagi
- Maria-sama ga Miteru (2010), Sachiko Ogasawara
- Afro Tanaka (2012), Mina
- Girls For Keeps (2012), Yūko Kitamura
- Good Coming: Tōru to Neko, Tama ni Neko (2012), Miyuki
- Bungo: Sasayaka na Yokubō Kokuhaku Suru Shinshitachi "Kōfuku no Kanata" (2012), Kinuko
- Party wa Sentō Kara Hajimaru (2012)
- Minasan, Sayōnara (2013), Yuri Matsushima
- Zekkyō Gakkyū (2013), Makoto Hosaka
- Crying 100 Times: Every Raindrop Falls (2013), Keiko Ogawa
- Kiyoku Yawaku (2013), Asami Kawaguchi
- Shin Ōkubo Monogatari (2013)
- Gajimaru Shokudō no Koi (2014), Mizuho Hirara
- Again (2015), Mie Tozawa
- Grasshopper (2015), Yuriko
- Before a Falling Star Fades Away (2015), Naoko Motoyama
- Oz Land (2018)
- Cafe Funiculi Funicula (2018)
- Dragon Quest: Your Story (2019), Flora (voice)
- All About March (2020), Yayoi Yūki
- Hotel Royal (2020), Masayo Tanaka
- Analog (2023), Miyuki

=== Dubbing ===
- Godzilla (2014), Elle Brody (Elizabeth Olsen)

=== Music videos ===
- Funky Monkey Babys - Kokuhaku (23 July 2008)
- Plus - Yukimichi (16 December 2009)
- Jang Keun-suk - Stay (30 May 2012)
- Indigo la End - Hitomi ni Utsuranai (24 September 2014)
- Dreams Come True - KNOCKKNOCK

== Bibliography ==
=== Magazines ===
- Seventeen, Shueisha 1967-, as an exclusive model from 2007 to 2012
- Non-no, Shueisha 1971-, as an exclusive model from 2012 to 2015

== Discography ==
=== Singles ===
- "I Miss You/Message: Asu no Boku e" (16 April 2008), ASIN B0014466SQ

== Accolades ==
Year	Award	Category	Work(s)	Result	Ref.
2016	9th Tokyo Drama Awards	Best Actress	Asa ga Kita	Won	
2017	41st Elan d'or Awards	Newcomer of the Year	Herself	Won	
2022	25th Nikkan Sports Drama Grand Prix	Best Actress	Night Doctor and Dear My Loneliness and Darkness	Won	
2024	66th Blue Ribbon Awards	Best Supporting Actress	Analog	Nominated	
