= Kokoro no Hoshi =

2010 studio album by Becky

- The cover for the standard and deluxe editions

Studio album by Becky♪♯
- Released: February 24, 2010
- Recorded: 2009–2010
- Genre: J-pop, funk
- Length: 46:28
- Label: EMI Music Japan

Becky♪♯ chronology
Kokoro no Hoshi (2010)	Kaze to Melody (2011)

Alternative cover
- "Special Price" edition cover

Singles from Kokoro no Hoshi
- 1. "Kokoro Komete" Released: December 2, 2009; 2. "Suki Dakara" Released: February 3, 2010

Kokoro no Hoshi (心の星, Heart's Star) is Becky♪♯'s debut album. It was released on February 24, 2010. For the months of March and April 2010, Becky was on tour to promote this album. The album comes as a "special price" edition; a standard edition with a special photo booklet; and a deluxe edition with the photo booklet, a mini-scrunchie designed by Becky, and a postcard to mail in for information on the live tour Becky is performing for the album. Her favorite songs off of the album are "Yami o Tsukinukete Yuku" and "Toki no Naka ni".

Kokoro no Hoshi debuted at #12 on the weekly Oricon albums chart, selling 11,802 copies in its first week.

== Track listing ==
All lyrics are written by Becky♪♯

No.	Title	Music	Length
1.	"Techno Cat" (テクノキャット Tekuno Kyatto)	Kenji Kondō	4:16
2.	"Suki Dakara"	Kondō	4:00
3.	"Kimi e" (君へ "To You")	Sachiko Kumagai	4:06
4.	"Kokoro Komete"	Yoshiyasu Ichikawa	4:43
5.	"Sorairo" (そらいろ "Sky Blue")	Kumagai	4:31
6.	"The Star Bridge" (～The STAR Bridge～)	Becky	0:28
7.	"WBC"	Becky	3:57
8.	"Tegami" (手紙 "Letter")	Becky	5:16
9.	"Sachi no Moto" (幸の素 "An Ingredient for Happiness")	Jun Seidō	4:27
10.	"Hapi Hapi"	Splash Candy	3:16
11.	"Yami o Tsukinukete Yuku" (闇を突きぬけてゆく "A Stab in the Dark")	Ichikawa	4:20
12.	"Toki no Naka ni" (時の中に "Within Time")	Becky	3:01
Total length:			46:28

== Charts and sales ==
Chart (2010)	Peak position	Sales figures
Japan Billboard Top Albums	10	20,213
Japan Oricon Daily Albums Chart	9	20,213
Japan Oricon Weekly Albums Chart	12	20,213
Japan Oricon Monthly Albums Chart	49	20,213
Japan SoundScan Albums Chart (Deluxe edition)	18	20,213
