= Keisuke Koide =

Japanese actor (born 1984)

- 小出 恵介
- Born: February 20, 1984 (age 42); Tokyo, Japan
- Occupation: Actor
- Years active: 2003-present
- Agents: Amuse; Rhythmedia

Keisuke Koide (小出 恵介, Koide Keisuke; born February 20, 1984) is a Japanese actor who starred in Kwak Jae-yong's film Cyborg She and in Koizora.

== Career ==
In 2017, Koide admitted to drinking alcohol and having sex with a 17-year-old girl after allegations were published in Friday. He was suspended by his talented agency, Amuse, Inc., a month later. Following his suspension, several acting projects he was involved in removed and recast his roles, including the Netflix series Jimmy: The True Story of a True Idiot. In 2020, he announced that he will make a comeback in acting from his three-year hiatus from moving to the US. He is under a new agency called "Rhythmedia".

== Filmography ==
=== Films ===
- Worst by Chance (2003)
- Break Through! (2004), Norio Yoshida
- Linda Linda Linda (2005), Abe
- Heavenly Forest (2006), Kyohei Sekiguchi
- Hatsukoi (2006), Kishi
- Koizora (2007)
- Kimi ni shika kikoenai (2007), Shinya Nozaki
- Kisaragi (2007), Snake
- Cyborg She (2008)
- Killer Bride's Perfect Crime (2009), Komine
- Gokusen: The Movie (2009)
- Rookies (2009)
- Run with the Wind (2009)
- Nodame Cantabile The Movie (2009)
- Nodame Cantabile The Movie II (2010)
- The Lightning Tree (2010), Sukejiro Seta
- Surely Someday (2010), Takumi
- Parade (2010)
- When I Kill Myself (2011), Warden Yohei Minami
- Strawberry Night (2013), Noriyuki Hayama
- The Last Chance: Diary of Comedians (2013), Koji Komoto
- Unsung Hero (2014), Toshio Moriwaki
- Jūjika (2016), Yū Sanada
- Shin Godzilla (2016)
- Traces of Sin (2017)
- Haruta & Chika (2017), Shinjirō Kusakabe
- God of War (2017), Yamagawa
- Bridal, My Song (2022)
- Twilight Cinema Blues (2023)
- Majo no Kōsui (2023)
- The Key (2026), Kimura
- Disease of Family (2026)

=== Television ===
- Night School (2004)
- Ranpo R (2004), ep.4
- Gokusen 2 (2005)
- Nodame Cantabile (2006)
- Oishii Proposal (2006)
- Love & Farm (2007)
- The Naminori Restaurant (2008)
- Rookies (2008)
- The Battle of Mr. & Mrs. Sasaki(2008)
- Jin (2009), Kyotaro Tachibana
- Jin 2 (2011), Kyotaro Tachibana
- Perfect Report | Paafekuto ripooto (2010), Shu Akasaka
- Doctor Ume (2012), Takeo
- Strawberry Night (2012), Noriyuki Hayama
