= Night Diver =

Single by Haruma Miura
- Released: July 24, 2020
- Recorded: 2020
- Genre: J-pop
- Length: 3:23
- Label: A-Sketch
- Songwriter: Yuki Tsujimura
- Producer: Yuki Tsujimura

Haruma Miura singles chronology
"Fight for Your Heart" (2019)	"Night Diver" (2020)

Music video
- "Night Diver" on YouTube

"Night Diver" is the second and final single by Japanese actor and singer Haruma Miura, released posthumously following his death on July 18, 2020. The song was released digitally via A-Sketch on July 24, 2020 and physically on August 26, 2020. The song debuted at number two on the Oricon Weekly Singles Chart, earning him his first top three single.

== Track listing ==
Digital single
No.	Title	Writer(s)	Arranger	Length
1.	"Night Diver"	Yuki Tsujimura	Tsujimura	3:23

CD single
No.	Title	Writer(s)	Arranger	Length
1.	"Night Diver"	Yuki Tsujimura	Tsujimura	3:23
2.	"One"	Kanata Okajima; Meg	Meg	4:17
3.	"You & I"	Haruma Miura	Miura	3:38

Limited edition DVD
No.	Title	Length
1.	"Night Diver" (Music video)	3:35
2.	"You" (Studio session)	4:17
3.	"Documentary Movie"	28:27

== Charts ==
=== Weekly charts ===
Chart performance of "Night Diver"
Chart (2020)	Peak position
Japan (Oricon)	2
Japan (Japan Hot 100) (Billboard)	2

=== Year-end charts ===
2020 year-end chart performance for "Night Diver"
Chart (2020)	Peak position
Japan (Japan Hot 100)	36

== Release history ==
Region	Date	Format	Label(s)
Various	24 July 2020	Digital download; streaming	A-Sketch
Japan	26 August 2020	CD; CD+DVD	A-Sketch
