= Again (film) =

2015 film

- Poster
- アゲイン 28年目の甲子園
- Directed by: Sumio Ōmori
- Screenplay by: Sumio Ōmori
- Starring: Kiichi Nakai; Haru; Emi Wakui; Toshirō Yanagiba; Mugi Kadowaki
- Cinematography: Akira Sakou
- Music by: Kunihiko Ryō
- Distributed by: Toei
- Release date: January 17, 2015
- Running time: 120 minutes
- Country: Japan
- Language: Japanese
- Box office: ¥51.2 million

Again (アゲイン 28年目の甲子園, Again 28 Nenme no Koshien) is a 2015 Japanese drama film directed by Sumio Ōmori (ja), based on the baseball novel by Kiyoshi Shigematsu. It was released on January 17, 2015. This film was shot at Koshien Stadium.

== Cast ==
- Kiichi Nakai as Haruhiko Sakamachi
- Haru as Mie Tozawa
- Emi Wakui as Yūko Tachihara
- Toshirō Yanagiba as Naoyuki Takahashi
- Mugi Kadowaki as Sanami

== Reception ==
The film earned ¥51,219,300 at the Japanese box office.
