= Kokoro Komete =

2009 single by Becky

Single by Becky♪♯

from the album Kokoro no Hoshi
- Released: December 2, 2009
- Recorded: 2009
- Genre: J-Pop
- Length: 24:04
- Label: EMI Music Japan
- Songwriter(s): Becky♪♯, Yoshiyasu Ichikawa, Splash Candy

Becky♪♯ singles chronology
"Himawari" (2006)	"Kokoro Komete" (2009)	"Suki Dakara" (2010)

Alternative cover
- Limited edition cover

"Kokoro Komete" (心こめて) is Becky's debut single under EMI Music Japan, released on December 2, 2009. It is the first single where she is credited under the name "Becky♪♯" (ベッキー♪♯, Bekkī♪♯, with the eighth note and sharp). The single is her first to debut in the Top 10. One of its B-sides "Hapi Hapi" (ハピハピ) was used as the opening theme for Crayon Shin-chan.

== Track listing ==
All lyrics are written by Becky♪♯

CD
No.	Title	Music	Length
1.	"Kokoro Komete" (心こめて "Wholeheartedly")	Yoshiyasu Ichikawa	4:45
2.	"Hapi Hapi" (ハピハピ)	Splash Candy	3:18
3.	"WBC" ("WBC" stands for "Wagamama Banzai Club" (わがままバンザイ倶楽部, Wagamama Banzai Kurabu, "Selfish Banzai Club"))	Becky♪♯	3:59
4.	"Kokoro Komete (Instrumental)"	Ichikawa	4:46
5.	"Hapi Hapi (Instrumental)"	Splash Candy	3:19
6.	"WBC (Instrumental)"	Becky♪♯	3:57

Limited edition DVD
No.	Title	Length
1.	"Kokoro Komete" (Music Video)

== Charts ==
=== Oricon Sales Charts ===
Release	Chart	Peak Position	Debut Sales	Sales Total	Chart Run
December 2, 2009	Oricon Daily Singles Chart	7		22,069	9 weeks
December 2, 2009	Oricon Weekly Singles Chart	10	11,825	22,069	9 weeks
December 2, 2009	Oricon Monthly Singles Chart			22,069	9 weeks
December 2, 2009	Oricon Yearly Singles Chart			22,069	9 weeks

=== Billboard Japan Sales Charts ===
Release	Chart	Peak Position
December 2, 2009	Billboard Japan Hot 100	5
December 2, 2009	Billboard Japan Hot Top Airplay	6
December 2, 2009	Billboard Japan Hot Singles Sales	11
December 2, 2009	Billboard Japan Adult Contemporary Airplay	26

=== Physical Sales Charts ===
Chart	Peak position
Oricon Daily Singles Chart	7
Oricon Weekly Singles Chart	10
Billboard Japan Hot Singles Sales	11
Soundscan Singles Chart (CD+DVD)	12
