= Karuho Shiina =

Japanese manga artist

Karuho Shiina 椎名軽穂
- Born: October 23, 1975 (age 51) Haboro, Hokkaido
- Area: Shōjo manga
- Notable works: Kimi ni Todoke
- Awards: 32nd Kodansha Manga Award Shōjo category (2008)

Karuho Shiina (Japanese: 椎名軽穂, Hepburn: Shiina Karuho) is a Japanese manga artist. Her manga Kimi ni Todoke won the award for best shōjo at the 32nd Kodansha Manga Award, and it was nominated for the first Manga Taishō in 2008. It was also adapted into an anime television series, a live action film and a TV drama series.

== Works ==
=== One-shots ===
- Analog Apaato - 1996
- Orange Apartment - 1997 (sequel of Analog Apaato)
- Stand by Me - 1998
- Garakuta Planet - 1999
- Ibitsu na Hoshi no Katachi - 1999
- Hi ga Kuretemo Aruiteru - 2001
- Sakura Ryou March - 2001
- Koi ni Ochiru - 2002
- Ashita wa Docchi da - 2002
- Aoi Futari - 2003
- Mayuge no Kakudo wa 45° de - 2013 (crossover of Kimi ni Todoke and Kazune Kawahara's Aozora Yell)

=== Series ===
- Crazy for You - 6 volumes, 2003–2005
- Kimi ni Todoke - 30 volumes, 2006–2017
- Kimi ni Todoke: Soulmate - 3 volumes, 2018–2022 (spin-off/sequel of both Crazy for You and Kimi ni Todoke)
- Gusts and Beats - 4 volumes, 2024–present

=== Illustrations and supervision ===
- Kimi ni Todoke - 16 volumes, novel, author: Kanae Shimokawa, 2007–2015
- Kimi ni Todoke: Ashita ni Nareba - one volume, novel, author: Kanae Shimokawa, 2009
- Kimi ni Todoke - 13 volumes, Juvenille Books, author: Kanako Shirai, 2011–2015
