= Harlock: Space Pirate =

2013 film by Shinji Aramaki

- Japanese release poster
- Directed by: Shinji Aramaki
- Screenplay by: Harutoshi Fukui; Kiyoto Takeuchi
- Story by: Harutoshi Fukui
- Based on: Space Pirate Captain Harlock by Leiji Matsumoto
- Produced by: Joseph Chou; Yoshi Ikezawa; Rei Kudo
- Starring: Shun Oguri; Haruma Miura; Yu Aoi
- Music by: Tetsuya Takahashi
- Production companies: Toei Animation; Marza Animation Planet
- Distributed by: Toei Company, Ltd.
- Release dates: September 3, 2013 (Venice); September 7, 2013 (Japan)
- Running time: 111 minutes
- Country: Japan
- Language: Japanese
- Budget: ¥3 billion ($30 million)
- Box office: $19 million

Harlock: Space Pirate (Japanese: 宇宙海賊キャプテンハーロック, Hepburn: Uchū Kaizoku Kyaputen Hārokku; released as Space Pirate Captain Harlock in Japan) is a 2013 Japanese 3D CG anime science fiction film directed by Shinji Aramaki. It is the most expensive Japanese CG anime film of all time, with a production budget of ¥3 billion ($30 million) and was a box-office bomb, having grossed only $19 million out of its $30 million budget.

== Plot ==
As resources dwindle, five hundred billion colonists return to Earth, causing the Homecoming War over Earth's remaining resources. The bloody war only ends when an authoritarian government, the Gaia Sanction, declares Earth a sacred planet forbidden to humanity. With the help of four unstoppable ships powered by alien technology, Harlock's fleet prevents Earth from recolonization until a treaty allows diplomatic elite to immigrate. Enraged by this betrayal, Harlock turns on the Gaia Sanction. With his ship, the Arcadia, badly damaged, Harlock unleashes the ship's dark matter. Harlock intends to encase Earth in a protective force field, but it instead becomes uninhabitable. The Arcadia survives but is forever changed. Now an immortal pirate, Harlock vows to atone.

Gaia obscures the condition of Earth with a giant hologram to maintain power. Harlock and his crew steal 100 warheads from the Gaia Sanction to "start over". Admiral Isora recruits his younger brother, Yama, to kill Harlock. Yama agrees, desperate to atone for a childhood accident that paralyzed Isora and critically injured their mutual love, Nami. Harlock, aware of his plan, allows Yama to infiltrate his crew. During a mission to install the penultimate warhead, Yama learns that Harlock's plan is to disrupt the timestream and alter history by exploding the warheads in strategic places throughout the universe. When the mission goes awry, Yama dooms himself to save a crew mate. Harlock rescues Yama, who briefly considers executing Harlock. On board the Arcadia, Harlock's words and attitude and the crew's acceptance convince Yama to follow Harlock.

The Gaia Sanction permit Isora to use a superweapon to stop Harlock. Harlock evades the Gaia fleet using holograms. Isora destroys the Arcadia with the superweapon, but this is another hologram. The real Arcadia ambushes the fleet, rams Isora's flagship, and Harlock takes the crew hostage. Once at Earth and past the great illusion, the crew is horrified at Earth's fate. Isora reveals Harlock's true plan: Harlock intends to destroy the current universe and rebirth a new one.

Shocked, Yama sides with Isora, and the Arcadia moves away from Earth, apparently of its own volition. Yama helps Isora and his crew take over the Arcadia. With the ship and crew imprisoned, Isora confronts Nami, who informed Yama of his tactical plans. Nami realizes that she is the source of Isora's torment, not Yama. Nami provokes Isora into causing her life support to fail. As Nami dies, she admits to loving him and sacrificing herself to bring him peace.

Isora lies about Nami's death. Disbelieving Isora and haunted by Nami's death, Yama returns to Earth, where he finds a meadow of flowers. Yama interrupts Harlock's public execution and releases the Arcadia's crew. Yama says both he and Harlock were wrong, and he shows them a flower. Overcome by the possibility of a peaceful "starting over", Harlock abandons his previous plans and decides to expose the Gaia Sanction.

The Arcadia evades the Gaia Fleet and destroys Earth's hologram emitters. The exposed truth of Earth's condition destabilizes the Gaia Sanction, which depended on a quasi-religious veneration of Earth to legitimize their rule. Desperate to contain the situation, the Gaia Sanction's leader decides to use a doomsday particle cannon to destroy the Arcadia. Realizing Earth could be destroyed, too, Isora rams the Arcadia and pushes it away from Earth. Both ships board each other, causing many casualties on both sides.

Yama confronts Isora. Isora shoots at Yama's face, scarring him similarly to Harlock. Harlock mortally wounds Isora, saving Yama. When Isora warns them about the particle cannon, Harlock remarks that Isora was the only one to remain faithful to Earth. Harlock again unleashes the Arcadia's dark matter. With the Arcadia moved further from Earth and protected by a dark matter shield, both Earth and the Arcadia survive the cannon's blast. As Isora dies, he explains that he saved Earth because he knew Nami and their mother loved flowers.

After the Arcadia crash lands on Earth, Harlock sets the final detonator and says another Homecoming War is inevitable. Believing Earth is a gift from Nami and Isora, Yama refuses to destroy it. Liking his answer, Harlock gives the detonator to Yama and says the universe needs the myth of Captain Harlock. As the Gaia Sanction fleet confronts the Arcadia, the crew wakes up, seemingly healed by the dark matter, and the ship escapes, now commanded by Yama who then becomes the new Captain Harlock.

== Cast ==
- Haruma Miura as Yama Daiba (Logan in English release)
- Shun Oguri as Captain Harlock
- Yū Aoi as Miime (Mimay in English release)
- Arata Furuta as Yattaran (Yullian in US release)
- Ayano Fukuda as Tori-san
- Toshiyuki Morikawa as Isora Daiba (Ezra in English release)
- Maaya Sakamoto as Nami
- Miyuki Sawashiro as Kei
- Kiyoshi Kobayashi as Roujin
- Chikao Ōtsuka as Soukan

=== English voice cast ===
- Adam Gibbs as Logan (Yama Daiba in original release)
- David Matranga as Captain Harlock
- Emily Neves as Mimay (Miime in original release)
- Jessica Boone as Kei
- Rob Mungle as Yullian (Yattaran in original release)
- Mike Yager as Ezra (Isora Daiba in original release)
- Rebekah Stevens as Nami

== Production ==
In 2010, Toei Animation developed a pilot for a computer-graphics remake of the earlier manga-inspired TV series, and presented it at Tokyo International Anime Fair that year. In the next year they presented a preview of Space Pirate Captain Harlock at Annecy International Animated Film Festival. This is Toei's highest production budget ever at the equivalent of over US$30 million. The story was reconstructed by the writer Harutoshi Fukui to reflect the themes of modern society and Toei provided the latest filmmaking technology for the film. With a production budget of ¥3 billion ($30 million), it surpassed Katsuhiro Otomo's Steamboy (2004) to become the most expensive Japanese anime film of all time.

International sales for the film were handled by GFM Films. The company produced an English-narrated international teaser trailer for promotion. It was shown in the competition of the 70th Venice International Film Festival and was screened at the 33rd Hawaii International Film Festival.

== Reception ==
=== Box office ===
By September 2013, it had grossed ¥437,326,416 (US$4,452,519) at the Japanese box office. It went on to gross ¥500 million ($5,123,179) in Japan.

Space Pirate Captain Harlock is the most successful Japanese film ever screened in Italy, making about US$6.8 million by the end of January 2014. Having earned more in France and Italy than it did in Japan, the film went onto gross $13,557,798 overseas, bringing its worldwide gross to $18,680,977.

=== Critical reception ===
The film received mixed reviews from critics. Filmmaker James Cameron praised the film for its CGI animation and use of 3D.

It was recognized as the best international animated feature at the fifth annual 3D Creative Arts Awards held at Warner Bros. Studios in Los Angeles on January 28, 2014. It was nominated for the Japan Academy Prize for Animation of the Year at the 37th Japan Academy Prize. It won the Lumière award in Best International 3D Feature – Animated category at the 3D Creative Arts Award (2014).
