= Cyborg She =

- Theatrical release poster
- Directed by: Kwak Jae-yong
- Written by: Kwak Jae-yong
- Produced by: Ji Young-jun; Hidemi Satani; Mataichiro Yamamoto
- Starring: Haruka Ayase; Keisuke Koide
- Cinematography: Junichirō Hayashi
- Edited by: Kim Sang-bum; Shuichi Kakesu
- Music by: Naoki Otsubo
- Production companies: Amuse Soft Entertainment; Dentsu; GAGA USEN; TBS; Shogakukan; MBS; Bear Entertainment, Inc.; Centurion Movie & Knowledge-based service 3rd Investment Fund; Tristone Entertainment
- Distributed by: Gaga Corporation
- Release date: 12 May 2008
- Running time: 120 minutes
- Country: Japan
- Language: Japanese
- Box office: US$7.2 million

Cyborg She (Japanese: 僕の彼女はサイボーグ, Hepburn: Boku no Kanojo wa Saibōgu) is a 2008 Japanese science fiction comedy-drama film directed by Kwak Jae-yong, starring Haruka Ayase and Keisuke Koide. Although the characters are different and the stories unrelated, Cyborg She is unofficially but lovingly seen by genre fans as being the third installment in a trilogy of "strange girl" films written and directed by Kwak, the previous films being My Sassy Girl and Windstruck.

== Plot ==
It is 22 November 2007. Jiro Kitamura (Keisuke Koide) is spending his 20th birthday alone. As he buys a birthday present for himself in a shopping mall, he gets the attention of a 'cute girl' (Haruka Ayase) and she surprisingly smiles at him. Afterwards, she successfully steals a pair of clothes, which Jiro notices, but he ignores it as she walks away in front of him, and he is distracted by her beauty. The mystery girl, who seems to be interested in him, follows him to a restaurant, where he eats spaghetti on the advice of his grandmother. She suddenly appears and sits with him, stating that it's her birthday too. The two of them then exchange birthday presents. The girl, who seems unused to everything, behaves very boldly and suddenly rushes with Jiro out of the restaurant without paying the bill, provoking the manager to chase the two through the streets of the city. As he spends time with the girl, Jiro finds himself charmed by her. But, after a few hours, the girl insists she has to leave and goes with a tearful goodbye.

The story then jumps to one year later, as Jiro again celebrates his birthday alone in the same restaurant. All of a sudden, the same girl appears and joins him. While he rejoices in her presence, the restaurant is suddenly attacked by a gunman, but she saves him and the other guests by throwing the gunman out the window. Despite her cute outward appearance, she is incredibly strong and behaves erratically. Later, in Jiro's home, she reveals her true identity by showing him a 3D projection of a video in which an elderly Jiro from the future explains how he created her as a cyborg and warns him about an upcoming disaster. The old Jiro told him that the shooting at the restaurant burned him and paralyzed him for life. However, a lottery ticket he bought earlier was fortunate for him. He spent all his time and money on one thing: creating the cyborg girl to save his past self -- exactly as Jiro experience that night at the restaurant. Old Jiro believes that he has restored the "natural" history of his timeline by sending her. The girl becomes Jiro's protector as well as a loyal friend and they both share some wonderful moments. She also saves many other lives from tragic deaths that old Jiro had regretted witnessing. These include:

- a small boy from an oncoming truck
- an elementary school soccer team from a fire
- a girls' high school from a madman with a knife

Over time, Jiro not only becomes dependent on, but also falls in love with her. However, when she cannot return his feelings, he gets irritated and in the evening of 2009-03-13, in a drunken rage, forbids her from seeing him unless she can feel his heart. He begins to regret this, especially when it becomes apparent that she is still helping him while staying out of sight. Another disaster soon occurs: a gigantic earthquake completely devastates Tokyo on 2009-04-03. As his apartment block collapses, she comes to help him, but even her superhuman strength isn't enough to save herself. After telling Jiro that she now understands his feelings, she is destroyed while saving him. Later, distraught, Jiro digs up her body on 2009-04-07 and spends the next 61 years trying to rebuild her. He eventually succeeds but dies shortly after, on 2074-09-28.

Further in the future (63 years later) on 2133-04-19, a girl is told by her friend that there is a cyborg on display that looks just like her. She is curious and with the help of her father buys the now defunct cyborg in an auction on 2134-10-09. She uses a special machine to experience the memories stored in the cyborg's hard drive. Intrigued, she then decides to fulfill her wish of going back in time to meet Jiro. She is revealed to be the real girl who met Jiro on his 20th birthday (22 November 2007), explaining that she wanted to meet him before the cyborg did. We see an emotional replay of their first night together, this time from her point of view. The story then jumps forward to the moment when Jiro is weeping over the destroyed body of the cyborg. In a surprise twist, the girl suddenly appears again, finally declaring that she can "feel his heart," and decides to live with Jiro from then on, changing his fate again.

== Timelines ==
While revealed dramatically in different manners throughout the film, the narrative includes three distinct timelines that intertwine to form the full story.

=== Timeline 1 ===
On his 20th birthday (22 November 2007), Jiro is visited by a mysterious girl who charms him but leaves suddenly after telling him that the man living in Jiro's house jilted her. Jiro buys a lottery ticket shortly before his 21st birthday (22 November 2008). On that day, he is tragically shot and wounded by a crazed gunman at the Italian restaurant. Although paralyzed for the rest of his life, he is able to fulfill his childhood promise to his (grand)mother and become a scientist, using his lottery winnings to create a cyborg in the perfect image of the girl who charmed him on his 20th birthday. From his high-tech wheelchair complete with robotic arms, he records a message to his younger self, embeds the message in the cyborg, and sends her back to 22 November 2008 to meet himself on his 21st birthday and prevent the shooting.

=== Timeline 2 ===
On his 21st birthday (22 November 2008), Jiro is suddenly visited by the same girl from one year earlier, who now rescues him from the shooting and proves to be a cyborg. Jiro spends some amount of time with the cyborg (probably many weeks), falls in love with her, but sends her away in a drunken rage, only to be rescued again by her in the Tokyo earthquake where she perishes. Jiro takes possession of the cyborg torso and spends the rest of his life reconstructing her and builds several exact copies. The cyborg is finally able to "feel his heart" and Jiro (this time in a normal wheelchair) dies happy. Decades later, the cyborg girl ends up in a museum where a human girl who looks just like her learns their story (via Jiro's writings also acquired by the museum). A few years later, the human girl's rich father helps her purchase the cyborg in an auction. Using that future's technology, she downloads the cyborg's memories into her own brain. She falls in love with the memories of Jiro and obtains special permission to use a time machine to visit the past for a few hours. She travels back in time to Jiro's 20th birthday (22 November 2007) when she charms him but tearfully must leave him due to the limitations of that time trip.

=== Timeline 3 ===
After returning to her own time in the future, the human girl again uses the time machine, this time returning to the exact point in time when Jiro finds the cyborg torso in the ruins of Tokyo. She announces that she has decided to live the rest of her life in young Jiro's timeline. We have no idea whether Jiro goes on to become a scientist in this timeline, but it is safe to assume that he does not build girl cyborgs because he already has love in his life, resulting in a completely different life for the couple.

== Cast ==
- Haruka Ayase as the girl, the cyborg, and the future girl
- Keisuke Koide as Jiro Kitamura
- Kenta Kiritani as Kenta Sato, Jiro's classmate
- Naoto Takenaka as the college professor
- Kazuko Yoshiyuki as Jiro's mother
- Hiromasa Taguchi as the unnamed shooter
- Fumiyo Kohinata as the TV reporter
- Risa Ai as Jiro's date
- Rokuro Naya as adult Jiro
- Endo Kenichi as the auctioneer

== Adaptations ==
A manga adaptation by Akihiro Nakamura was released on 17 October 2008 (ISBN 4063755746). Based on the film, it was published in Kodansha's Young Magazine.
