= Gusts and Beats =

Japanese manga series

- First tankōbon volume cover

突風とビート (Toppū to Bīto)
- Genre: Mystery; Romantic comedy; Supernatural
- Manga
- Written by: Karuho Shiina
- Published by: Shueisha
- English publisher: NA: Yen Press
- Imprint: Margaret Comics
- Magazine: Bessatsu Margaret
- Original run: March 13, 2024 – present
- Volumes: 5

Gusts and Beats (突風とビート, Toppū to Bīto) is a Japanese manga series written and illustrated by Karuho Shiina. The series is Shiina's first new serialization in 18 years. It began serialization in Shueisha's shōjo manga magazine Bessatsu Margaret in March 2024.

== Synopsis ==
The series focuses on the relationship between two students who can see ghosts. Nike is a girl who recently moved back into Hokkaido, and she had been asked to deliver schoolwork to Nemoto, her classmate. When she gets to Nemoto's house, she encounters some ghosts, but unlike Nemoto she cannot differentiate between ghosts and humans.

== Publication ==
Written and illustrated by Karuho Shiina, Gusts and Beats is Shiina's first new serialization in 18 years, and her first using digital production. It began serialization in Shueisha's shōjo manga magazine Bessatsu Margaret on March 13, 2024. Its chapters have been compiled into five tankōbon volumes as of August 2026.

The series chapters are simultaneously published in English on Shueisha's Manga Plus app. During their panel at Anime North 2026, Yen Press announced that they had licensed the series for English publication.

No.	Original release date	Original ISBN	English release date	English ISBN
1	July 25, 2024	978-4-08-843030-0	December 15, 2026	979-8-8554-3200-8
2	February 25, 2025	978-4-08-843093-5	—	—
3	September 25, 2025	978-4-08-843170-3	—	—
4	January 23, 2026	978-4-08-843224-3	—	—
5	August 25, 2026	978-4-08-843287-8	—	—

== Reception ==
The series, alongside Through Romance, was ranked seventh in the 2025 edition of Takarajimasha's Kono Manga ga Sugoi! guidebook's list of the best manga for female readers.
