= Samurai High School =

Japanese television series

- Samurai Haisukuru サムライ・ハイスクール
- Genre: Japanese television drama
- Written by: Yumiko Inoue
- Directed by: Toya Sato; Ryuichi Inomata
- Starring: Haruma Miura; Yu Shirota
- Composer: Yugo Kanno
- Country of origin: Japan
- No. of episodes: 9

Production
- Executive producer: Yuko Hazeyama
- Producers: Tetsuhiro Ogino; Masahiro Uchiyama
- Running time: Saturday 21:00 (54 minutes)

Original release
- Network: NTV
- Release: 17 October – 12 December 2009

Samurai High School (サムライ・ハイスクール, Samurai haisukuru) is a Japanese television drama.

== Synopsis ==
The series follows the story of Mochizuki Kotaro, a mild-mannered, unmanly high school student. While visiting a library one day, he encounters Himiko, a mysterious librarian who recommends to him an ancient book about a heroic general from the Sengoku period, which occurred 400 years ago. Kotaro notices that he has the same name and age as the general described in the book and experiences a flashback. Kotaro later mentions the book to his father, who tells him that he may be the descendant of a powerful samurai. At that moment, Kotaro receives a message from his childhood friend Ai, telling him that their classmate Nakamura Tsuyoshi is in trouble. He rushes to the scene but does not have the courage to help, until another flashback transforms him into a samurai.

== Cast ==
- Haruma Miura as Mochizuki Kotaro
- Yu Shirota as Nakamura Tsuyoshi
- Anne Watanabe as Nagasawa Ai
  - Wakana Aoi as young Nagasawa Ai
- Ohgo Suzuka as Mochizuki Yuna
- Ryoko Kobayashi as Minami Yurika
- Dori Sakurada
- Tomo Yanagishita as Wada Daisuke
- Aoi Nakabeppu
- Mikako Ichikawa as Miki Sayaka
- Saki Matsuda as Kisaragi Hidemi
- Nobuaki Kaneko as Motoyama Hiroshi
- Akio Kaneda
- Midoriko Kimura
- Mimura as Watanuki Himiko
- Shigeru Muroi as Kamei Kyoko
- Goro Kishitani as Mochizuki Shinji
- Kento Kaku as Iwanaga Hitoshi
- Nobuaki Kaneko as Police

== Production credits ==
- Screenwriter: Yumiko Inoue.
- Chief producer: Yuko Hazeyama.
- Producer: Tetsuhiro Ogino, Masahiro Uchiyama.
- Directors: Toya Sato, Ryuichi Inomata.
- Music: Yugo Kanno.
