= Koizora (film) =

- Theatrical release poster
- Directed by: Natsuki Imai
- Written by: Mutsuki Watanabe
- Based on: Koizora by Mika
- Produced by: Kazuya Kamana; Masayuki Morigawa; Jun Nasuda
- Starring: Yui Aragaki; Haruma Miura; Keisuke Koide
- Cinematography: Hideo Watanabe
- Edited by: Junnosuke Hogaki
- Music by: Shin Kono
- Distributed by: Toho
- Release date: November 3, 2007 (Japan)
- Running time: 129 minutes
- Country: Japan
- Language: Japanese
- Box office: $36,684,020

Koizora (Japanese: 恋空; lit. "Sky of Love") is a 2007 Japanese film based on a cell phone novel of the same name. The film is directed by Natsuki Imai and stars Yui Aragaki and Haruma Miura.

Koizora debuted at the Japanese box office on 3 November 2007. It grossed a total of US$36,684,020 in both Japanese and international box office markets.

== Plot ==
During her freshman year in high school, Mika Tahara loses her cell phone, but later finds it in the school library with the help of an unknown caller. Throughout the summer, Mika and the mysterious caller continue to communicate, and agree to meet each other once school starts again. The caller turns out to be Hiro, a delinquent-like boy that Mika is initially afraid of, who shows proof of his identity as the caller with a photo of the sky on his cellular phone.

From her friends and through her first sexual encounter with Hiro, Mika learns that he had a girlfriend named Saki. Although Hiro reassures her that he broke up with her, Saki, who still is in love with Hiro, holds a vendetta against Mika and hires a group of men to rape her. The horrific encounter ends with Hiro and his older sister Minako punishing both the men and Saki, but Mika continues to be harassed at school when Saki spreads rumors about her. Hiro protects Mika from all of the bullying advances, but she assures him that she's not frightened from being with him.

Mika later becomes pregnant after she and Hiro consummate in the school library. Hiro is thrilled by the news and both of them gain Hiro's parents' permission to raise the child together, although Mika's parents disapprove of the action. Despite this, Mika is determined to have the baby. After an altercation with Saki, the baby's birth ends in a miscarriage. Despaired, Mika and Hiro build a grave for their baby and promise each other to come visit the memorial yearly on the day of the baby's death.

Shortly after their second year in high school begins, Hiro begins to distance himself from Mika and breaks up with her. Although hurt, Mika meets a college student named Yū at a gōkon, who becomes sympathetic to her situation. The two date, and Yū even prevents Mika's parents from divorcing. On the day of the baby's death, Mika finds Hiro visiting the grave as per their promise. The next year, she continues to move on from Hiro; however, on the day of the baby's death, Mika finds Nozomu at the grave. Nozomu reveals Hiro's illness, and that he was asked by Hiro himself to watch over Mika.

Mika breaks up with Yū and finds Hiro in the hospital, diagnosed with cancer, with only three months left to live. Upset that he pretended he didn't love her only to ensure she would have a happy future, she insists that only he can make her happy. Hiro eventually gives into his feelings and gets back together with her. Mika begins to visit the hospital daily, even taking an academic leave, to take care of Hiro, who slowly begins to show signs of recovery. Hiro's resolve to live becomes stronger until he dies during a check-up. Mika is saddened by Hiro's death and tries to commit suicide, but is stopped by a flock of birds flying towards her. She takes this as a sign of Hiro, in the sky, discouraging her from killing herself, and realizes through this and Hiro's journal that he would have wanted her to continue to live. Seven years later, she reflects on how her life had changed upon meeting Hiro, and that she is living happily with him and their baby in mind.

== Cast ==
- Yui Aragaki as Mika Tahara (田原美嘉, Tahara Mika), an ordinary high school student who falls in love with Hiro and finds her experiences in love to be one of the most wonderful feelings in the world.
- Haruma Miura as Hiroki Sakurai (桜井弘樹, Sakurai Hiroki), nicknamed "Hiro" (ヒロ), a former delinquent notable by his dyed hair. He later discovers he has cancer and distances himself from his love.
- Keisuke Koide as Yū Fukuhara (福原優, Fukuhara Yū), a college student from the Kansai region who becomes Mika's emotional support after Hiro breaks up with her.
- Asami Usuda as Saki (咲), Hiro's ex-girlfriend who still is in love with Hiro and continuously harasses Mika through many lengths, including rape and physical assault.
- Karina as Minako Sakurai (桜井ミナコ, Minako Sakurai), Hiro's older sister
- Aoi Nakamura as Nozomu (ノゾム), Hiro's equally delinquent-like best friend who immediately develops an interest in Mika.
- Haru as Aya (アヤ), Mika's best friend who has a crush on Nozomu.
- Ryuji Yamamoto as Hirokazu Sakurai (桜井博一), Hiro's father.
- Yumi Asō as Akemi Sakurai (桜井明美), Hiro's mother.
- George Takahashi as Katsuji Tahara (田原勝治), Mika's father.
- Yūko Asano as Yasue Tahara (田原安江), Mika's mother.

== Production ==
=== Development ===
On April 19, 2007, a film for Koizora was green-lit and was to be directed by TBS director Natsuki Imai. Imai's previous works included television dramas Orange Days and Taiyou no Uta, and Koizora was her first experience directing a film.

=== Pre-production ===
News of actress Yui Aragaki cast as Mika in the film together with the announcement of this film on April 19, 2007. On May 13, 2007, Haruma Miura and Keisuke Koide were cast as Hiroki and Yū respectively.

=== Filming ===
The filming for Koizora began on April 23, 2007 and was scheduled to finish in June 2007.

=== Music ===
The soundtrack was composed by Shin Kouno and was released on October 31, 2007, by Harbor Records. Along with the background music, two theme songs were promoted alongside the movie. Mr. Children's "Tabidachi no Uta" (旅立ちの唄, Tabidachi no Uta) was the ending theme song of the movie. Yui Aragaki herself penned and sang "Heavenly Days", an insert song of the film.

== Release ==
=== Box office ===
In Japan, Koizora was released in theaters on November 3, 2007. It was released in Singapore cinemas on 5 March 2008 by local distributor Cathay-Keris Films.

=== Home media ===
Koizora was released on Region 2 DVD on April 25, 2008 by Toho in two forms: a standard edition and a premium edition. The premium edition contained a second disk with extra footage, interviews, and music videos of the theme songs.

== Reception ==
=== Box office ===
In Japan, approximately 3.14 million people came to watch the movie upon its release. According to the Motion Picture Producers Association of Japan, Koizora was the 6th highest grossing Japanese film of 2007 with a total gross of ¥3.9 billion.

=== Awards ===
Year	Award	Category	Result	Recipient
2007	20th Nikkan Sports Film Award	Best Newcomer Award	Won	Yui Aragaki (Also for Waruboro)
2008	31st Japan Academy Prize	Newcomer of the Year	Won	Yui Aragaki and Haruma Miura
2008	50th Blue Ribbon Awards	Best Newcomer Award	Won	Yui Aragaki (Also for Waruboro and Tokyo Serendipity)
2008	62nd Mainichi Film Award	Tsutaya Fan Award	Won	Koizora
2008	29th Yokohama Film Festival	Best Newcomer Award	Won	Yui Aragaki (Also for Waruboro and Tokyo Serendipity)
