= Last Cinderella =

- Genre: Romance; Comedy
- Directed by: Ryo Tanaka; Shin Hirano; Munenori Sekino
- Starring: Ryoko Shinohara; Haruma Miura; Naohito Fujiki; Nene Otsuka; Naoko Iijima
- Country of origin: Japan
- Original language: Japanese
- No. of episodes: 11

Production
- Producer: Toshiyuki Nakano
- Running time: Thursdays at 22:00 (JST)

Original release
- Network: Fuji Television
- Release: April 11 – June 20, 2013

Last Cinderella (ラスト♡シンデレラ) is a 2013 Japanese television series that aired on Fuji Television from April 11 to June 20, 2013. It features actors Ryoko Shinohara, Haruma Miura and Naohito Fujiki.

== Plot ==
Sakura is a single 39-year-old woman who manages a beauty salon. She discovers a hair growing on her chin, and wonders if she is becoming more masculine from being without a boyfriend for so long. When she goes to work, an old acquaintance, Rintaro, has been promoted to be the new manager of her salon. He baits her alleging that she has given up on finding the right guy. One of her clients, Chiyoko, likes Rintaro, but is worried that Rintaro will fall for Sakura, so she invites Sakura to a speed dating party, where she asks the young Hiroto to seduce Sakura. Hiroto waits nearby, and when Sakura loses one of her shoes, he calls her his Cinderella as he puts the shoe on. The next thing she knows, Sakura wakes up in a hotel room with Hiroto, apparently having slept with him. Hiroto asks her to start dating.

One of Sakura's friends, Miki, is in a sexless marriage, bullied by an everpresent mother-in-law. Their other friend Shima is divorced, but fills the void in her life with meaningless sex with men she barely knows, one of whom is Miki's husband.

Hiroto feels guilty for accidentally scarring Chiyoko's back when they were kids which caused problems in her love life. Chiyoko constantly hurts him by reminding him of the scar and what it has done to her love life. Hiroto feels guilty enough that he will do anything Chiyoko asks of him, including helping Chiyoko separate Sakura and her boss/neighbor, Rintaro, because Chiyoko is in love with Rintaro. But as Hiroto spends time with Sakura, he falls in love with her. Rintaro begins to intrude after he became aware of the relationship between his employee and her much younger boyfriend. Realizing his own feelings for Sakura in the process.

As time passes by everyone works to face the obstacles in their lives. Miki and Shima work on facing their problems in order to move on. Chiyoko learns to forgive Hiroto, decides to remove her scar and face the fact that Rintaro does not love her. Hiroto tells Sakura he loves her and finally gains his family's approval to become a Pro BMX rider. Rintaro learns to face his feelings about Sakura. And Sakura, after learning about Hiroto's real reason for dating her and that both Rintaro and Hiroto love her, first allows her heart to heal then faces her feelings. Finally, she figures out between Hiroto and Rintaro, who she loves.

== Cast ==
- Ryoko Shinohara as Sakura Toyama
- Naohito Fujiki as Rintaro Tachibana
- Haruma Miura as Hiroto Saeki
- Nene Otsuka as Miki Takenouchi
- Naoko Iijima as Shima Hasegawa
- Nanao Arai as Chiyoko Ogami
- Shozo Endo as Kohei Takenouchi
- Satoshi Hashimoto as Kenichi Endo
- Naoto Kataoka as Tomonori Kashiwagi
- Saori Takizawa as Nozomi Matsuo
- Kaoru Hirata as Haruko Shibata
- Yumiko Nogawa as Setsuko Takenouchi

=== Guest ===
- Kyoko Yoshine as Saki Takenouchi (eps. 1-3)
- Naoki Sasahara as Kakeru Takenouchi (eps. 1-3)
- Yui Ichikawa as Momo (eps. 1-3)
- Chieko Ichikawa as Yoko (ep 1)
- Kazuma Yamane as Gokon Party's Member (ep 1)
- Kazumi Tatebe (ep 1)
- Kosuke Yonehara (ep 1)
- Yukari Taki as Happy Go Lucky Customer (ep. 1)
- Junichi Kato (ep 1)
- Maria Yoshikawa as Shoko (ep 1)
- Akira Kubodera (ep 1)
- Masaru Hotta (ep. 1)
- Sayaka Ena (ep 1)
- Nao Yasuoka as Hotel's Staff (ep 1)
- Manabu Taguchi (ep 1)
- Keiji Yamashita as Nishizawa (ep 1)
- Toru Kazama as Toshio Hagiwara (ep 1)
- Eiji Yamamoto as Happy Go Lucky Customer (ep 2)
- Chihiro Itakura as Boy In The Bus (ep 2)
- Kenjiro Nishiumi (ep 2)
- Yasuhisa Furuhara as Hiroto's Friend (ep 2)
- Machiko Matsumura (ep 2)
- Yoko Tajitsu (ep 2)
- Melo Imai (ep 2)
- Yusuke Yamamoto as Masaomi (ep. 6-7)
