= Kimi ni Todoke (film) =

- Theatrical release poster
- Directed by: Naoto Kumazawa
- Written by: Rika Nezu; Naoto Kumazawa
- Based on: Kimi ni Todoke by Karuho Shiina
- Produced by: Takahiro Sato
- Starring: Mikako Tabe; Haruma Miura; Misako Renbutsu; Natsuna Watanabe; Haru Aoyama; Arata Iura; Mirei Kiritani
- Cinematography: Masayuki Fujii
- Edited by: Nobuyuki Takahashi
- Music by: Gorō Yasukawa
- Production companies: Nippon Television; Nikkatsu; Django Film
- Distributed by: Toho
- Release date: 25 September 2010 (Japan)
- Running time: 128 minutes
- Country: Japan
- Language: Japanese
- Box office: US$18,027,475

Kimi ni Todoke (君に届け; lit. "Reaching You"), also known as From Me to You, is a 2010 Japanese romantic drama film based on the manga of the same name. The film is directed by Naoto Kumazawa, who also co-wrote the film's script with Rika Nezu. The film stars actress Mikako Tabe, who plays the role of Sawako Kuronuma, also known as "Sadako", and Haruma Miura, who plays the role of Shota Kazehaya, an outgoing teenager who is popular with his classmates.

Kimi ni Todoke was released in Japanese cinemas on 25 September 2010. It was subsequently screened at the 10th Asian Film Festival of Dallas on 17 July 2011. The film grossed a total of $18,027,475 in Japan.

== Plot ==
Sawako Kuronuma has always been avoided by her classmates because her name, her appearance and her manner too strongly resembles that of "Sadako", the main character in the 1998 horror film Ring. They believe that when one stared into Sawako's eyes for more than three seconds, bad luck will befall the person. They also believed that she could summon ghosts. These rumors got worse because Sawako is unable to express her views straightforwardly. All of the students call her 'Sadako', instead of her real name, and tell over and over again misfortunes that have befallen other students supposedly because of Sawako. However, Sawako is a kind person whose motto is "to do one good thing once a day". Shota Kazehaya, on the other hand, is an outgoing student who is popular with his schoolmates, especially the girls.

On the first day of school, Sawako helped Kazehaya, who was lost, to find his way to the school. Since that day, Kazehaya treats Sawako with kindness, making Sawako respect and admire him. Sawako also made friends with her classmates Chizuru Yoshida and Ayane Yano after she agrees to play the role of the ghost in their class's "Bravery Challenge" activity. With their help, she manages to gain self-confidence and interacts better with her classmates. The rumors about her also began to subside. However, Ume Kurumizawa, an admirer of Kazehaya, starts to become jealous of the way Sawako is being treated by Kazehaya.

Strange rumors like "Ayane has slept with 100 guys" started spreading. Sawako distances herself from her new-found friends, believing that they were targeted by the rumors because they were close to her and she did not want them to get hurt because of her. Both Chizuru and Ayane felt hurt after they overheard Sawako saying that she did not regard them as friends. However, with advice from Kazehaya, Sawako stands up to the people who were spreading the rumors. Sawako did not back down in spite of violence, and Chizuru and Ayane were greatly touched by Sawako's actions. Their friendship becomes stronger.

At a sports festival, Kurumizawa, on the pretense of being Sawako's friend, confessed her feelings for Kazehaya to Sawako and asked Sawako for her help. Sawako refused, saying that Kazehaya was also special to her. Kurumizawa then tried desperately to turn Sawako's attention to Ryu, even to the extent of secretly arranging a meeting between them so that she could "coincidentally" walk past with Kazehaya. However, the plan backfired as Kazehaya got jealous and grabbed Sawako's hand and pulled her away. Chizuru and Ayane later discovered Kurumizawa's plot and cornered her, warning her about breaking apart Kazehaya and Sawako. However, Sawako begged both of them not to reveal this incident to Kazehaya. Kurumizawa later confessed her feelings for Kazehaya, who rejected her but said that he was happy that she confessed to him.

As winter came, Sawako's father requested that she take a bus home instead of walking because he was concerned for her safety. When applying for the student concessionary pass, her teacher misplaces her student handbook, which contains treasured items such as a cherry blossom petal Sawako picked up on the day she first met Kazehaya, causing her grief. Kazehaya and Sawako also begin to spend less time together, because Kazehaya used to walk Sawako home. Kazehaya then tries desperately to go with her on a date and to confess to her, but Sawako always misunderstands and invites Chizuru along.

Out of desperation, Kazehaya suddenly confesses his feelings for Sawako and asks her to be his girlfriend. He also asked if she could go out on a date with him on Christmas Eve. Sawako rejected him and ran to the bus, leaving Kazehaya feeling dejected. To make matters worse, she did not turn up at a Christmas Eve party that she promised to go to, leaving Kazehaya in a foul mood at the party. Chizuru and Ayane suggest that she go apologize to Kazehaya on New Year's Eve, when he volunteers at a festival every year. However, Sawako's father's orchestra has a concert that night, leaving Sawako conflicted over which to choose. With encouragement from her former rival Kurumizawa, Sawako eventually decides on Kazehaya, and apologizes to her father. Meanwhile, Kazehaya, after seeing Sawako's handbook that the teacher passed to him, finally understands Sawako's feelings towards him. Eventually, they meet up just after New Year's Day and properly convey their feelings.

== Cast ==
- Mikako Tabe as Sawako Kuronuma, whose name is often mistakenly pronounced as "Sadako", the name of a lead character in the film Ring. She is actually a kind person who puts others before herself, and she is also a hardworking student who consistently scores high grades in examinations. Her birthday is on 31 December 1994.
- Haruma Miura as Shota Kazehaya, a popular and outgoing student in school who has won many admirers. He fell in love with Sawako during the first time he met her.
- Misako Renbutsu as Chizuru Yoshida, an ex-delinquent who comes from the same junior high school as Kazehaya and Ryu. She secretly likes Toru, Ryu's older brother, though this later changed when she found out that he was engaged.
- Natsuna Watanabe as Ayane Yano, who is not good at expressing herself like Sawako. Her best friend is Chizuru, whom she was classmates with in junior high school.
- Mirei Kiritani as Ume Kurumizawa, a girl who had a crush on Kazehaya since they knew each other in junior high school. He was the reason why she enrolled in this high school.
- Haru Aoyama as Ryu Sanada, a star of the school's baseball team. He confessed to Sawako that he likes Chizuru, whom he has been friends since they were young.
- Yuta Kanai as Soichi Shironouchi
- Arata Iura as Kazuichi Arai, the class's homeroom teacher. He is neither passionate nor responsible, and does things according to his own liking. However, he sometimes gives his students useful advice.
- Yasuko Tomita as Sawako's mother
- Masanobu Katsumura as Sawako's father, who plays the clash cymbals in an orchestra.
- Ryuto Yamaguchi as Toru Sanada, Ryu's older brother and Chizuru's crush.
- Keiko Yoshida as Haruka Katayama, Toru's fiancée.
- Airi Matsuyama as Tomomi Endo
- Narumi Konno as Eriko Hirano
- Rena Haruyama

== Production ==
=== Development ===
A live-action film adaptation of the manga Kimi ni Todoke was first announced in the February 2010 issue of the Bessatsu Margaret magazine. Kimi ni Todoke is serialized in the Bessatsu Margaret magazine since 2005, and it had won the 32nd Annual Kodansha Manga Award. The manga was also made into an anime series in 2009, and it was translated into English in North America by publisher Viz Media. No other details were released, though the announcement contained a message from the manga artist Karuho Shiina.

More details for this film adaptation were revealed on 2 April 2010. It was announced that director Naoto Kumazawa, whose previous works includes the 2006 film Rainbow Song and the 2008 film Dive!!, will be directing the film. The cast members of this film includes Mikako Tabe, plays Sawako Kuronuma in this film. In addition, actor Haruma Miura stars as Shota Kazehaya in Kimi ni Todoke.

=== Filming ===
Kimi ni Todoke was mainly filmed in Ashikaga, Tochigi. The scenes featuring the cherry blossoms were filmed in Orihime Park, while the school scenes were filmed in the former Ashikaga West High School campus. The Yakumo Jinja (八雲神社) was also featured in Kimi ni Todoke as the location of the New Year party in the film. The filming at this location took place during a 40-day period from 27 April 2010 to 6 June 2010. In addition, some scenes in Kimi ni Todoke were filmed in Kiryū city, Gumma Prefecture.

A "End of Filming Ceremony" was held on 8 June 2010 at the former Ashikaga West High School campus, with all the cast members appearing in their school uniform costumes. At the ceremony, actor Haruma Miura said that he felt no discomfort about playing the role of the "real Kazehaya", describing it as a "tailor-made" role. He also took the opportunity to thank his father.

=== Theme song ===
The theme song for the film is the song Kimi ni Todoke, which is sung by Japanese pop-rock band Flumpool. This was revealed in an announcement made on 14 July 2010. Flumpool member Ryuta Yamamura, who revealed that he loved reading the manga Kimi ni Todoke, said that "We (the Flumpool members) believe that many people who had read the manga attributed the qualities of "courage" and "kindness" to the work. The single album for this song is released in conjunction with the film's release.

The music video of the song Kimi ni Todoke was filmed at an undisclosed junior high school in the Kanto Region. It involved over 200 high school students chosen from the Flumpool fan club and they will star as the audience in the concert where the band performed in a schoolyard.

== Release ==
Kimi ni Todoke was released in Japanese cinemas on 25 September 2010, where it was shown on 285 screens throughout the country. That day, the film had an opening ceremony held at the Toho cinema in Roppongi Hills. Director Naoto Kumazawa and the film cast members made an appearance there, where they were greeted by a hall full of fans. There, Haruma Miura read out a letter which was written by Karuho Shiina, the manga artist of Kimi ni Todoke, and was addressed to him and his co-star actress Mikako Tabe. The message, which said that "Haruma's perseverance to date should absolutely be delivered to the whole of Japan", moved Haruma to tears.

Kimi ni Todoke made its international debut at the 10th Asian Film Festival of Dallas, where it was screened on 17 July 2011. It was subsequently released in Singapore under its English title From Me to You by distributors Golden Village Pictures and Encore Films on 6 October 2011.

== Reception ==
=== Box office ===
Kimi ni Todoke grossed a total of over 234 million yen on its debut weekend of 25–26 September 2010, making it the second-highest-grossing film in the Japanese box office that weekend. During the two days, 190,278 people went to watch the film, the majority of whom were teenagers and young adults in their 20s. In addition, female viewers of the film outnumbered male viewers by a ratio of 22:3. On its second week in the Japanese box office, Kimi ni Todoke dropped to the fourth position, earning a cumulative total of 619,477,600 yen and 522,106 viewers.
