= Satoshi Hashimoto =

Japanese actor

- 橋本 さとし
- Born: April 26, 1966 (age 60); Hirakata, Osaka Prefecture, Japan
- Occupations: Actor; voice actor
- Years active: 1989–present
- Agent: Horipro
- Website: hashimotosatoshi.com

Satoshi Hashimoto (橋本 さとし, Hashimoto Satoshi; born April 26, 1966) is a Japanese actor and voice actor currently affiliated with the Horipro voice actor agency. Hashimoto is noted for his roles as Terry Bogard and Kim Kaphwan in the Fatal Fury and The King of Fighters fighting game series, reprising his role as Terry in The King of Fighters: Another Day anime. In addition, he has also had voiceover experience voicing Fire Convoy (Optimus Prime) in the original Japanese version of Transformers: Robots in Disguise, entitled "Car Robots".

Although not hugely active in the Japanese anime industry, Hashimoto is a prolific actor in various other entertainment fields. He has done many live-action movies, TV dramas, and stage plays, and has made appearances in several television commercials.

== Filmography ==
=== Film ===
- Kindaichi shōnen no jimembo: Shanghai ningyo densetsu (1997), Kōda
- Whiteout (2000), Shingo Tozuka
- Tokyo Zombie (2005), Dongaira
- Gegege no Kitaro (2007), Kuko
- The Untold Tale of the Three Kingdoms (2020), Guan Yu
- Kamen Rider Saber: Trio of Deep Sin (2022), Shinjiro Shinozaki/Kamen Rider Falchion (III)
- Tokyo MER: Mobile Emergency Room – The Movie (2023), Suguru Komaba
- Kingdom 5: The Clash of Souls (2026), Zhang Tang
- Tokyo MER: Mobile Emergency Room – Capital Crisis (2026), Suguru Komaba

=== Television ===
- Furuhata Ninzaburō (1999), Ishimori
- The Professionals (2006–present), narrator
- Yūkan Club (2007), Kongō
- The After-Dinner Mysteries (2011), Kunio Tachibana
- Taira no Kiyomori (2012), Minamoto no Tametomo
- Last Cinderella (2013), Kenichi Endō
- Black Pean (2018), Seiichirou Kurosaki
- Natsuzora: Natsu's Sky (2019), Kōsuke Arai
- Zenkamono (2021)
- Tokyo MER: Mobile Emergency Room (2021), Suguru Komaba
- What Will You Do, Ieyasu? (2023), Yamagata Masakage
- Ranman (2023), Mori Arinori
- Vivant (2023), Tomohiko Hara

=== Television animation ===
- Transformers: Car Robots (2000) – Fire Convoy
- The King of Fighters: Another Day (2006) – Terry Bogard, episode 2 (Accede)

=== Video games ===
- Fatal Fury: King of Fighters - Terry Bogard, Andy Bogard, Joe Higashi
- Fatal Fury 2 (1992) – Terry Bogard, Kim Kaphwan
- Fatal Fury Special (1993) – Terry Bogard, Kim Kaphwan
- The King of Fighters '94 (1994) – Terry Bogard, Kim Kaphwan
- Fatal Fury 3: Road to the Final Victory (1995) – Terry Bogard
- The King of Fighters '95 (1995) – Terry Bogard, Kim Kaphwan
- Real Bout Fatal Fury (1995) – Terry Bogard, Kim Kaphwan,
- The King of Fighters '96 (1996) – Terry Bogard, Kim Kaphwan
- Real Bout Fatal Fury Special (1997) – Terry Bogard, Kim Kaphwan
- The King of Fighters '97 (1997) – Terry Bogard, Kim Kaphwan
- Real Bout Fatal Fury 2: The Newcomers (1998) – Terry Bogard, Kim Kaphwan
- The King of Fighters '98 (1998) – Terry Bogard, Kim Kaphwan
- The King of Fighters: Kyo (1998) – Terry Bogard, Kim Kaphwan
- Fatal Fury: Wild Ambition (1999) – Terry Bogard, Kim Kaphwan
- The King of Fighters '99 (1999) – Terry Bogard, Kim Kaphwan
- Garou: Mark of the Wolves (1999) – Terry Bogard
- The King of Fighters 2000 (2000) – Terry Bogard, Kim Kaphwan
- Capcom vs. SNK: Millennium Fight 2000 (2000) – Terry Bogard, Kim Kaphwan
- Capcom vs. SNK 2: Millionaire Fighting 2001 (2001) – Terry Bogard, Kim Kaphwan
- The King of Fighters 2001 (2001) – Terry Bogard, Kim Kaphwan
- The King of Fighters 2002 (2002) – Terry Bogard, Kim Kaphwan
- SNK vs. Capcom: SVC Chaos (2003) – Terry Bogard, Kim Kaphwan
- The King of Fighters 2003 (2003) – Terry Bogard, Kim Kaphwan
- The King of Fighters Neowave (2004) – Terry Bogard, Kim Kaphawn
- KOF: Maximum Impact (2004) – Terry Bogard
- NeoGeo Battle Coliseum (2005) – Terry Bogard, Kim Kaphwan
- The King of Fighters XI (2005) – Terry Bogard, Kim Kaphwan
- KOF: Maximum Impact 2 (2006) – Terry Bogard, Wild Wolf, Kim Kaphwan
- The King of Fighters XII (2009) – Terry Bogard
- KOF Sky Stage (2010) – Terry Bogard
- The King of Fighters XIII (2010) – Terry Bogard
- Neo Geo Heroes: Ultimate Shooting (2010) – Terry Bogard
- Fatal Fury: City of the Wolves (2025) – Announcer (Japanese voice)

=== Stage ===
- The Rocky Horror Show (1995) – Eddie/Dr. Everett V. Scott
- Witness for the Prosecution (1999) – Barrister, Yoichi Tachibana
- Hamlet (2001) – Laertes
- The Nutcracker (2001) – Drosselmeyer
- The Mold Man Who Rings the Bell of Dublin (2002-2005) – Warrior
- Cinderella Story (2003-2005) – Court Minister Pierre
- Miss Saigon (2004-2009) – The Engineer
- The Beggar's Opera (2006-2008) – Mr. Peachum, Filch, Tom
- Les Misérables (2007-2009) – Jean Valjean
- Jane Eyre (2009-2011) – Edward Rochester
- A Clockwork Orange (2011) – Dr. Brodsky, Conspirator Dolin, Brie
- The Three Musketeers (2011) – Athos
- Romeo & Juliet (2012) – Father Lawrence
- A Tale of Two Cities (2013) – Defarge
- Sherlock Holmes Anderson Family Secrets – Sherlock Holmes
- The Addams Family (2014-2017) – Gomez Addams
- Twelfth Night (2015) – Malvolio
- Sherlock Holmes 2 ~Bloody Game~ (2015) – Sherlock Holmes
- Vincent van Gogh (2016) – Vincent van Gogh
- Murder Ballad (2016) – Michael
- Something Rotten! (2018) – Nostradamus
- Spirited Away (2022-2024) – Kamaji
- Moulin Rouge! (2023-2024, 2027) – Harold Zidler
- Come from Away (2024) – Claude Elliott, others
- Love Never Dies (2025) – Erik, The Phantom of the Opera
- Finding Neverland (2027) – Charles Frohman/Captain James Hook

=== Dubbing ===
==== Live-action ====
- Ally McBeal – Victor Morrison (Jon Bon Jovi)

==== Animation ====
- Coco – Ernesto de la Cruz

== CD ==
=== Albums ===
- Neo Geo Guys Vocal Collection
- SNK Character Sounds Collection Volume 4 ~ Terry Bogard
- Neo Geo DJ Station Live '98
- Neo Geo DJ Station in Neochupi
- Neo Geo DJ Station 2 ~BOF Returns~
- Neo Geo DJ Station Live '99
- Neo Geo DJ Station in Gemodura Night
- King Of Fighters '96 Drama CD
- King Of Fighters '97 Drama CD
- King Of Fighters '97 Drama CD
- King Of Fighters '98 Drama CD
- King Of Fighters '99 Drama CD
- King Of Fighters '00 Drama CD
