= Maria-sama ga Miteru (film) =

- Theatrical poster

Japanese name
- Kanji: マリア様がみてる
- Directed by: Kōtarō Terauchi
- Written by: Kōtarō Terauchi; Keiji Sagami
- Based on: Maria-sama ga Miteru by Oyuki Konno
- Produced by: Shingo Ishikawa
- Starring: Honoka Miki; Haru
- Music by: Chika Fujino
- Production company: Jolly Roger
- Distributed by: Liverpool
- Release date: November 6, 2010
- Running time: 90 minutes
- Country: Japan
- Language: Japanese

Maria-sama ga Miteru (マリア様がみてる, Maria Watches Over Us) is a 2010 Japanese film co-written and directed by Kōtarō Terauchi. The film is based on the light novel series Maria-sama ga Miteru written by Oyuki Konno, with illustrations by Reine Hibiki. It was released in Japanese theaters on November 6, 2010, and later released on Blu-ray Disc and DVD on July 29, 2011, by Liverpool.

== Plot ==
Yumi Fukuzawa (Honoka Miki) has been attending Lillian Girls' Academy, a Catholic high school, for about six months when one day, while praying in front of the Virgin Mary statue near the school entrance, she is approached by second-year student Sachiko Ogasawara (Haru) who straightens Yumi's uniform neckerchief. Yumi's classmate Tsutako Takeshima (Alice Hirose) later shows her that she took a photograph of Yumi's meeting with Sachiko earlier that morning. Tsutako agrees to give Yumi the photo, but only if she can display it at the upcoming school festival and get Sachiko's permission to do so as well. As Sachiko is a member of the Yamayuri Council, which acts as the student council, they head over to the Rose Mansion on campus, the meeting place of the council. Yumi and Tsutako are waiting outside in the hallway while the council is having a meeting when Sachiko bursts out of the room and knocks Yumi and herself down. Sachiko apologizes and is about to leave, but Tsutako shows her the photo and asks her permission to display it. Sachiko takes Yumi back into the meeting room, followed by Tsutako, and tells the other members that she has chosen Yumi to be her petite sœur.

Third-year student and Rosa Chinensis Yōko Mizuno (Kaoru Hirata) explains to Yumi that they will be performing Cinderella at the upcoming school festival. Sachiko has been chosen to play the lead opposite Suguru Kashiwagi (Masahiro Usui), the student council president of the neighboring Hanadera Boys' Academy, much to her displeasure. Yōko told Sachiko that she would not have to play Cinderella if she could find a petite sœur. However, when Sachiko tries to give Yumi her rosary in front of the others, Yumi refuses to be her petite sœur. Yumi tries to come to Sachiko's aide, but in doing so, Yōko proposes that if Sachiko really can make Yumi her petite sœur, then Yumi will play Cinderella. After school, Sachiko comes to get Yumi so they can practice for the play, which includes dance lessons. The next day, Sachiko personally brings Yumi her own script so she can practice the lines. Sachiko later tests her, and sees that Yumi has been memorizing the lines.

Yōko later explains to Yumi that the play is an attempt to lessen Sachiko's dislike of men, and Yōko asks Yumi to guide Suguru from the front gate to the Rose Mansion. Sachiko goes to the auditorium first, followed by Yumi, and the two practice dancing for a bit. Yumi notices Sachiko's displeasure with having to dance with Suguru, but suspects there is more to it than simply her dislike of men. When Sachiko goes missing, Yumi and the others go to look for her, and Yumi and Sei Satō (Karen Takizawa) find her with Suguru in an unused classroom. Sachiko explains that Suguru is her cousin, and Suguru further explains that they are engaged to be married. Suguru tries to kiss Sachiko, who slaps him and runs away, followed by Yumi. Sachiko tells her that their engagement was set up by their parents. The play goes well with Sachiko playing Cinderella. Following the after party, Yumi leaves the Rose Mansion and believes her life will now return to normal. However, Yumi is stopped by Sachiko in front of the Virgin Mary statue and she once again offers Yumi her rosary, who accepts.

== Cast ==
Most of the main cast are fashion models: for example, Honoka Miki models for Love Berry and Haru for Seventeen.

- Honoka Miki (未来 穂香, Miki Honoka) as Yumi Fukuzawa
- Haru (波瑠) as Sachiko Ogasawara
- Kaoru Hirata (平田 薫, Hirata Kaoru) as Yōko Mizuno
- Karen Takizawa (滝沢 カレン, Takizawa Karen) as Sei Satō
- Nana Akiyama (秋山 奈々, Akiyama Nana) as Eriko Torii
- Riho Takada (高田 里穂, Takada Riho) as Shimako Tōdō
- Rikako Sakata (坂田 梨香子, Sakata Rikako) as Rei Hasekura
- Hitomi Miyake (三宅 ひとみ, Miyake Hitomi) as Yoshino Shimazu
- Alice Hirose (広瀬 アリス, Hirose Arisu) as Tsutako Takeshima
- Masahiro Usui (碓井 将大, Usui Masahiro) as Suguru Kashiwagi

== Production and release ==
The film, produced by the studio Jolly Roger, is directed by Kōtarō Terauchi, who co-wrote the script with Keiji Sagami. The soundtrack is composed by Chika Fujino. The film's theme song "Heavenly Days" by CooRie was released on her album Heavenly Days in October 2010. The film was released on Blu-ray Disc and DVD in Japan on July 29, 2011.
