= Bloody Monday (manga) =

Japanese manga series

- First tankōbon volume cover
- Genre: Spy thriller
- Manga
- Written by: Ryō Ryūmon
- Illustrated by: Kōji Megumi
- Published by: Kodansha
- English publisher: NA: Kodansha USA (first series only); SG: Chuang Yi
- Imprint: Shōnen Magazine Comics
- Magazine: Weekly Shōnen Magazine
- Original run: March 28, 2007 – March 28, 2012
- Volumes: 22
- Series titles
- 1. Bloody Monday (2007–2009; 11 volumes); 2. Bloody Monday Season 2: Pandora no Hako (2009–2011; 8 volumes); 3. Bloody Monday Final Season (2011–2012; 4 volumes)
- Television drama
- Directed by: Hirano Shunichi
- Original network: TBS
- Original run: October 11, 2008 – December 20, 2008
- Episodes: 11
- Television drama

Bloody Monday Season 2: Pandora no Hako
- Directed by: Hirano Shunichi
- Original network: TBS
- Original run: January 23, 2010 – March 20, 2010
- Episodes: 9
- icon

Bloody Monday (stylized in all caps) is a Japanese manga series written by Ryō Ryūmon and illustrated by Kōji Megumi. It was serialized in Kodansha's shōnen manga magazine Weekly Shōnen Magazine from March 2007 to April 2009, with its chapters collected in 11 tankōbon volumes. A second series, Bloody Monday Season 2: Pandora no Hako, was serialized in the same magazine from October 2009 to April 2011, with its chapters collected in eight volumes. A third series, Bloody Monday Final Season, was serialized in the same magazine from June 2011 to March 2012, with its chapters collected in four volumes. A television drama adaptation was broadcast for two seasons in 2008 and 2010, respectively.

== Plot ==
A Russian spy is discovered dead in Japan, with the only evidence to his death being a memory chip he managed to conceal from his killer. The Public Security Intelligence Agency's Third-I section hires Fujimaru Takagi, a skilled hacker known as "Falcon," to decipher the chip, which includes a video file depicting a viral epidemic in Russia that kills thousands, known as the Christmas Massacre.

Things become even more complicated when Fujimaru's father, a high-ranking officer inside Third-I, is wrongfully suspected of murdering his supervisor after learning more about the Christmas Massacre, later receiving the code name "Bloody Monday."

Maya Orihara, the terrorist responsible for the incident in Russia, is currently in Tokyo in order to recover the memory stick and prevent Third-I from learning the truth about the terrorist plan in Japan. She disguises herself as a teacher at Fujimaru Takagi's High School. From there, Fujimaru struggles to know who he can trust as he utilises his high-level hacking abilities to try to save the country and solve the mystery of Bloody Monday and the cult behind it.

== Characters ==
Fujimaru Takagi (高木 藤丸, Takagi Fujimaru)
Portrayed by: Haruma Miura
A second year high school student and a member of the Newspaper Club. Unbeknownst to everyone (except his father, the PSIA, and the Newspaper Club), he is also Falcon, a genius hacker who breaks into corrupt people's computers and exposes their crimes. He possesses exceptional computer skills, which he developed at the bequest of his late mother, who taught Fujimaru how to operate a computer before her death. Fujimaru is later depicted living a somewhat regular life, working at a café and preparing to pass the college entrance tests, which he had failed once - on purpose, as Otoya put it. Because of the events of Bloody Monday, he appeared to have put his hacking days behind him. It was later revealed that he was still working as a hacker for Third-I, and that his café manager was also a member of Third-I. However, he prevents a plane from flying into the National Diet building, a nuclear catastrophe, and a terrorist organization from taking the Pandora Box. It is revealed that he was introduced to hacking through Peter Pan (who is one of the terrorists). He later develops feelings for Hibiki.
Hibiki Mizusawa (水沢 響, Mizusawa Hibiki)
One of eight identical humans created from genetic material taken from male and female agents with the top results over three generations of agents who had gone through the facility. She later develops romantic feelings for Fujimaru when he tells her she is more than just a clone.
Maya Orihara (折原 マヤ, Orihara Maya)
Portrayed by: Michiko Kichise
The person responsible for the Christmas Massacre and the procurement of the "Bloody-X" virus in Russia. When she returned to Japan, she disguised herself as a biology teacher at Mishiro Academy High School to monitor Fujimaru Takagi. Considering she is a cold and calculated murderer who does not care who dies to attain her goal. Eventually revealed to be a paid mercenary for the main terrorist group, with just the money given to her form the mission in mind. She survived the experience as a whole, but she does not acquire the money she was anticipating, much to her dismay. She subsequently reappears working for an as-yet unidentified organisation opposed to the major antagonists, prompting her to throw her support to a sceptical Fujimaru.
Otoya Kujō (九条 音弥, Kujō Otoya)
Portrayed by: Takeru Sato
A third-year student, President of the Newspaper Club, and an accomplished archer who has ranked second at the national level. He is Fujimaru Takagi's childhood friend and "back up" - having been informed of every exploit Fujimaru Takagi undertakes as Falcon. He was the only person outside of Third-I who knew of Fujimaru's extraordinary hacking abilities at the start of the series, and he was the one who alerted the Newspaper Club about Takagi's work (with Fujimaru's agreement). Otoya had feelings for Fujimaru's younger sister, Haruka. Masamune Kuj, the Minister of Justice, is his grandfather. It is eventually discovered that "J" is his half-brother, and he finally gets to meet his parents, whom he was taken away from by his grandpa. Otoya later returns as a college student.
Ryūnosuke Takagi (高木 竜之介, Takagi Ryūnosuke)
Portrayed by: Tetsushi Tanaka
Fujimaru's father works for the Public Security Intelligence Agency under its secret Third Division, aka Third-I, as its Vice Director. He was framed for the murder of Director Okita and spent some time on the run while he attempted to solve the mysteries of "Bloody Monday." He is finally proved innocent, despite suffering multiple injuries throughout the series. Rynosuke goes undercover in a cult he entered eight years ago to avert a terrorist assault that might eclipse the "Bloody Monday" danger. He is killed while attempting to slow down the terrorists. He was a double agent known among the terrorists commanded by Alexei as 'Beast' (the shooter of the magic bullet)
Aoi Asada (朝田 あおい, Asada Aoi)
Portrayed by: Fujii Mina
A second year student and Vice President of the Newspaper Club. She is Fujimaru's father's karate apprentice and a competent combatant. She appears to have a crush on Fujimaru and frequently flirts with him. Asada is accepted into a karate college, despite the fact that of the gunshot wound she received from Orihara during the "Bloody Monday" event that left a significant scar on her leg. It has also been established that she is being kept in the dark about "Falcon's" ongoing actions.
Mako Anzai (安斎 真子, Anzai Mako)
Portrayed by: Eri Tokunaga
AA first-year student who is a member of the Newspaper Club. She admires the hacker "Falcon." After discovering that Fujimaru was him, she gained a slight crush, more of an obsession, with him. She is eventually revealed to be "K," the mastermind behind the terrorist cult responsible for the "Bloody Monday" catastrophe. When the cult's leader is killed shortly after escaping from jail, she seizes control of the organisation and sets the ultimate events in action. However, when the final hour approaches, she is betrayed and slain by her helper Judas. Despite being "K" and having plans to destroy Tokyo, her death was very difficult for Fujimaru, who still has regrets about it.
Hide Tachikawa (立川 英, Tachikawa Hide)
Portrayed by: Masahiro Hisano
A second-year student and member of the Newspaper Club. He appears to be the most ignorant and inept member of the group, yet he attempts to assist Fujimaru in any way he can. He shares his home with his father, stepmother, and stepbrother. His stepmother and her brother are both members of the terrorist cult. He dies after discovering his stepfamilies hidden associations, as a result of his stepmother infecting him with the "Bloody-X" virus. It is assumed that his father was shot by his stepmother in order to tie up loose ends.
Haruka Takagi (高木 遥, Takagi Haruka)
Portrayed by: Umika Kawashima
Fujimaru's younger sister by two years. She suffers from kidney failure, requiring dialysis about every three days. Haruka appears to have a crush on Otoya. She is later seen to be considerably healthier as a result of receiving home dialysis equipment from Otoya and his grandfather, which allows her to get treatment while sleeping. For fear of affecting her health, she is frequently kept in the dark regarding events involving Fujimaru and her father.

== Media ==
=== Manga ===
Written by Ryō Ryūmon and illustrated by Kōji Megumi, Bloody Monday was serialized in Kodansha's shōnen manga magazine Weekly Shōnen Magazine from March 28, 2007, to April 15, 2009. (Note: The series finished in the magazine's 20th issue of 2009, released on April 15 of the same year.) Kodansha collected its chapters in 11 tankōbon volumes, released from August 17, 2007, to September 15, 2009.

A second series, titled Bloody Monday Season 2: Pandora no Hako (BLOODY MONDAY Season2 ~絶望ノ匣~), was serialized in the same magazine from July 14, 2009, to April 20, 2011. Its chapters were collected in eight volumes, released from December 17, 2009, to May 17, 2011.

A third series, titled Bloody Monday Final Season (BLOODY MONDAY ラストシーズン), was serialized in the same magazine from June 15, 2011, to March 28, 2012. Its chapters were collected in four volumes, released from October 17, 2011, to May 17, 2012.

The first series was licensed in English in Singapore by Chuang Yi, which released eight volumes until 2010. The first series was licensed for English release in North America by Kodansha USA. The 11 volumes were published from August 23, 2011, to July 23, 2013.

=== Drama ===
An 11-episode television drama adaptation was broadcast on TBS from October 11 to December 20, 2008.

A nine-episode second season, Bloody Monday Season 2: Pandora no Hako, was broadcast from January 23 to March 20, 2010.
