= Bokutachi no Koukan Nikki =

- Directed by: Teruyoshi Uchimura
- Based on: Geinin Koukan Nikki ~Yellow Hearts no Monogatari~ by Osamu Suzuki
- Starring: Atsushi Itō; Keisuke Koide
- Release date: March 23, 2013 (Japan)
- Country: Japan
- Language: Japanese

Bokutachi no Koukan Nikki (Japanese: ボクたちの交換日記) is a 2014 Japanese film directed by Teruyoshi Uchimura. Its English title is The Last Chance: Diary of Comedians.

== Cast ==
- Atsushi Itō
- Keisuke Koide
- Nagasawa Masami
