= Kisaragi (film) =

- Poster
- Directed by: Yūichi Satō
- Screenplay by: Ryota Kosawa
- Produced by: Kiichi Iguchi
- Starring: Teruyuki Kagawa; Keisuke Koide; Shun Oguri; Yūsuke Santamaria; Muga Tsukaji
- Cinematography: Akihiro Kawamura
- Edited by: Takuya Taguchi
- Music by: Naoki Satō
- Distributed by: Showgate
- Release date: 16 July 2007 (Japan)
- Running time: 108 minutes
- Country: Japan
- Language: Japanese

Kisaragi (Japanese: キサラギ) is a 2007 Japanese film directed by Yūichi Satō.

== Plot ==
One year after the suicide of C-list model Kisaragi Miki, five of her fans come together for a commemorative meeting. They slowly come to the realization that her death did not occur the way they thought it did. The more they talk, the more the case takes shape in their minds, and the closer they come to the truth.

== Cast ==
- Teruyuki Kagawa as Ichigo Musume
- Keisuke Koide as Snake
- Shun Oguri as Iemoto
- Yūsuke Santamaria as Oda Yuji
- Muga Tsukaji as Yasuo
- Kanako Sakai as Kisaragi Miki
- Raiki Yonemoto as the childhood version of Yasuo in photos.
- Joe Shishido

== Awards and nominations ==
50th Blue Ribbon Awards

- Won: Best Film
