= Suki Dakara (Becky song) =

2010 single by Becky

Single by Becky♪♯

from the album Kokoro no Hoshi
- Released: February 3, 2010
- Genre: J-Pop
- Length: 12:46
- Label: EMI Music Japan
- Songwriter: Becky

Becky♪♯ singles chronology
"Kokoro Komete" (2009)	"Suki Dakara" (2010)	"Emerald" (2010)

"Suki Dakara" (好きだから; lit. "Because I Love You") is Becky's second single as "Becky♪♯", released on February 3, 2010. It was included on her first album Kokoro no Hoshi.

== Track listing ==
All lyrics are written by Becky♪♯.

CD
No.	Title	Music	Length
1.	"Suki Dakara" (好きだから "Because I Love You")	Kenji Kondō (近藤 健次, Kondō Kenji)	4:02
2.	"Suki Dakara (Instrumental)"	Kondō	4:02
3.	"Kokoro Komete (Star Remix)" (心こめて (STAR Remix))	Yoshiyasu Ichikawa (市川 喜康, Ichikawa Yoshiyasu)	4:42

== Charts ==
=== Oricon Sales Charts ===
Release	Chart	Peak Position	Debut Sales	Sales Total	Chart Run
February 3, 2010	Oricon Daily Singles Chart	8		13,703	4 weeks
February 3, 2010	Oricon Weekly Singles Chart	11	7,286	13,703	4 weeks
February 3, 2010	Oricon Monthly Singles Chart	33	13,703	13,703	4 weeks
February 3, 2010	Oricon Yearly Singles Chart			13,703	4 weeks

=== Billboard Japan Sales Charts ===
Release	Chart	Peak Position
February 3, 2010	Billboard Japan Hot 100	9
February 3, 2010	Billboard Japan Hot Top Airplay	12
February 3, 2010	Billboard Japan Hot Singles Sales	11

=== Physical Sales Charts ===
Chart	Peak position
Oricon Daily Singles Chart	8
Oricon Weekly Singles Chart	11
Billboard Japan Hot Singles Sales	11
SoundScan Singles Chart (CD+DVD)	11
