= Haruma Miura =

Japanese actor (1990–2020)

- 三浦 春馬
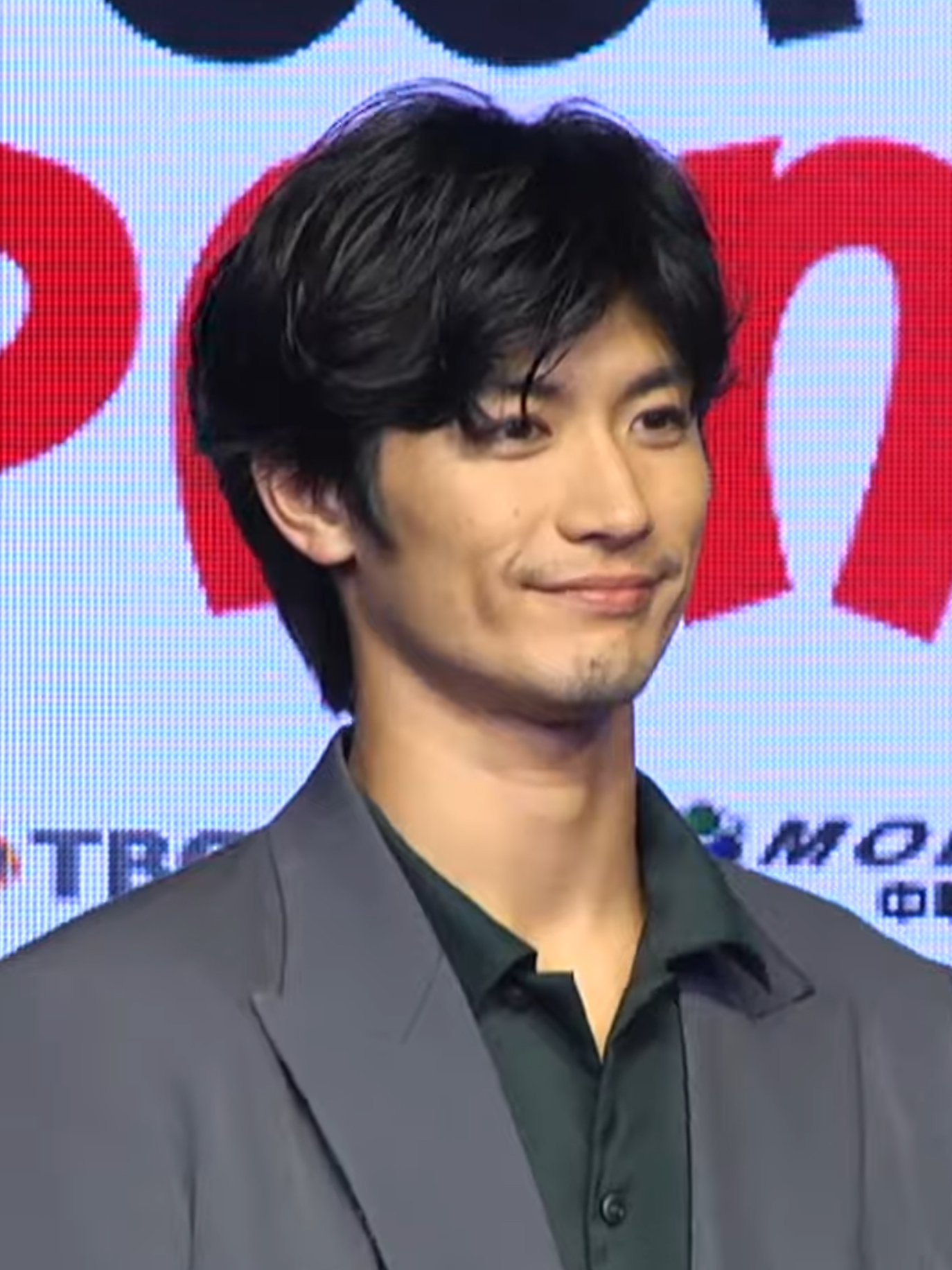
- Miura at a fan meeting in Taipei, August 2019
- Born: April 5, 1990; Tsuchiura, Ibaraki, Japan
- Died: July 18, 2020 (aged 30); Minato, Tokyo, Japan
- Occupations: Actor; singer
- Years active: 1997–2020
- Agent: Amuse Inc.
- Musical career
- Genres: J-pop
- Instrument: Vocals
- Label: A-Sketch
- Formerly of: Brash Brats
- Website: artist.amuse.co.jp/artist/miura_haruma/

Haruma Miura (三浦 春馬, Miura Haruma; April 5, 1990 – July 18, 2020) was a Japanese actor and singer. He made his acting debut in the television drama Agri (1997) and rose to popularity after starring in the film Koizora (2007), winning Newcomer of the Year at the 31st Japan Academy Prize. In the following years, Miura notably starred in the third season of Gokusen (2009), Bloody Monday (2009), Naoko (2009), Kimi ni Todoke (2010), Last Cinderella (2013), Boku no Ita Jikan (2013), The Eternal Zero (2013), Attack on Titan (2015), Gintama 2 (2018), and Two Weeks (2019). He also starred as Lola in the Japanese production of Kinky Boots (2016), winning Best New Actor and the Haruko Sugimura Award at the 24th Yomiuri Theater Awards. In addition to his acting career, Miura debuted as a singer in 2019 with the single "Fight for Your Heart."

Miura remained active in his acting career until his death in 2020. Following his death, his second single, "Night Diver" was released posthumously along with his other acting projects. He was posthumously awarded the Nikkan Sports Yujiro Ishihara Film Prize for Fan's Choice in Best Actor for his role in Godai: The Wunderkind.

== Career ==
=== 1997–2006: Early acting career ===
Haruma Miura made his acting debut in the television drama adaptation of the novel Agri when he was seven years old. He was enrolled at the Tsukuba branch of Actors Studio and was concurrently a member of the boy band Brash Brats with two other students. Following the closure of Actors Studio, the three signed to Amuse Inc. As Brash Brats went on indefinite hiatus in 2005, Miura continued his acting career. Early notable television projects that he appeared in include Ima, Ai ni Ikimasu, Unfair, Children, 14-sai no Haha, and Fight. He also appeared in the films Mori no Gakkō and Akihabara@Deep. His first starring role was Taiyō Sasaki in the 2006 film Catch a Wave.

=== 2007–2010: Rise to popularity ===
In 2007, Miura starred in the film Koizora as Hiro, and he also appeared in the film Negative Happy Chainsaw Edge. Following the release of Koizora, Miura won Newcomer of the Year for his role in the film at the 31st Japan Academy Film Prize. In 2008, he was cast as Ryo Shiraishi in Binbō Danshi, Ren Kazama in the third season of Gokusen, and Fujimaru Takagi in the live-action television drama adaptation of Bloody Monday, as well as a guest appearance in a special episode of Galileo as a younger version of the main character, Manabu Yukawa. In addition, he appeared in the music video for "Umaku Ienai" by Yuzu. Miura later starred in the film Naoko and won the Sponichi Grand Prix Newcomer Award at the 63rd Mainichi Film Awards for his performance. In October 2008, he released his second photobook, Letters. By the end of 2008, Miura's rise in popularity led him to rank No. 3 on Oricon's annual list of "18-year-olds expected to be successful" in 2008. Oricon ranked him No. 1 in a list of "most anticipated actors for 2009." He also ranked No. 1 in a list of "actors of interest" in a survey published by the magazine Ori-Star.

In February 2009, Miura was one of seven recipients who won Newcomer of the Year at the 2009 Elan d'or Awards. In April 2009, he appeared in the film Crows Zero 2 as Tatsuya Bitō. In March 2009, he reprised his role in Gokusen: The Movie, which was later released in July 2009. From June 20, 2009, to July 26, 2009, Miura starred in his first stage production, Hoshi no Daichi ni Furu Namida. In September 2009, Miura was cast as Kotaro Mochizuki in Samurai Seventeen, which was later renamed Samurai High School; this was his first leading role in an NTV drama.

In January 2010, Miura reprised his role for the second season of Bloody Monday. His third photobook, Switch, was released on February 5, 2010. In the same month, Miura released an idol DVD with Takeru Satoh chronicling their trip to New York City, which was titled HT: NY no Chūshin, Nabe no Tsutsuku. The DVD sold 12,000 physical copies upon release, ranking No. 5 on Oricon's weekly DVD charts. In April 2010, he was cast as Shōta Kazehaya in the live-action adaptation of Kimi ni Todoke, which was later released on September 25, 2010. In September 2010, he made his runway debut modeling at the 2010 Kobe Collection Autumn/Winter Show. Later that year, he was cast in his first getsuku drama, Taisetsu na Koto wa Subete Kimi ga Oshiete Kureta, as Shūji Kashiwagi, which was broadcast in January 2011.

=== 2011–2015: Domestic and international success ===
In May 2011, Miura played Kensuke Sanada in the episode "Janken" of television mini-series Yo ni mo Kimyō na Monogatari in during the 2011 spring serialization. He appeared in the television drama Saigo no Bansan: Keiji Tōno Kazuyuki to 7-nin no Yōgisha as Eiji Miyata in the last 45 seconds of the final episode as a teaser to the television drama Hi wa Mata Noboru, which he starred in. Hi wa Mata Noboru was later broadcast in July 2011. In June 2011, Miura starred in the film Tokyo Park. On November 11, 2011, Miura and Satoh released a second part of their video diary, titled HT: Sekidō no Mashita de, Nabe no Tsutsuku, which was filmed in Malaysia. The DVD charted at #2 on the Oricon Weekly DVD Chart and sold 14,000 physical copies on its first week of release, making it the best-selling male idol DVD since Private of W-inds in 2002.

In 2012, Miura co-starred in the stage play Kaitō Seven as Wild Upper. He then played lead in episode 8 of the television mini-series Keigo Higashino Mysteries. From 2012 to 2013, he co-starred in the stage play Zipang Punk: Goemon Rock III as a guest performer, portraying Akechi Shinkuro. In 2013, Miura co-starred in Last Cinderella as Hiroto Saeki. Last Cinderella enjoyed high ratings throughout its broadcast, and the producers of the series partially attribute its success from the "playful" sex appeal of the characters, particularly the scene of Miura's character taking a shower. In the same year, Miura co-starred in the animated film Harlock: Space Pirate, providing the voice to Yama. He also co-starred in the film The Eternal Zero as Kentaro Saeki, and he was nominated as Best Supporting Actor at the 38th Japan Academy Prize for his performance.

In 2014, Miura starred in the television drama Boku no Ita Jikan as Takuto Sawada and Satsujin Hensanchi 70 as Keisuke Miyahara. On April 18, 2015, he released his fourth photobook, Fureru. In June 2014, he starred in the music video for "Bakemono" by Nico Touches the Walls. In July 2014, at the 51st Galaxy Award, Miura won the Individual Award for his performances on Last Cinderella and Boku no Ita Jikan. He also starred in the live-action film adaptation of Five Minutes to Tomorrow, a Japanese-Chinese co-production, and learned Mandarin Chinese for the film. In 2015, Miura portrayed Val Xavier in the Japanese stage production of Orpheus Descending. He also portrayed Eren Jaeger in the two-part live-action film adaptation of Attack on Titan, with both films releasing in 2015.

=== 2016–2020: Music debut and final projects ===
In 2016, Miura co-starred in the live-action television drama adaptation of Never Let Me Go. Later, he was cast as Lola in the Japanese stage production of Kinky Boots. His performance was critically acclaimed, earning Best New Actor and the Haruko Sugimura Award at the 24th Yomiuri Theater Awards. He was cast as Ii Naochika in the taiga drama Naotora: The Lady Warlord, which was later broadcast in 2017. In January 2017, Miura was one of the recipients awarded at the 26th Japan Jewelry Best Dresser Award. In September 2017, he co-starred in the television drama Otona Koukou and also appeared in the music video for "Reportage" by Yu Takahashi, the theme song of the series.

In 2018, Miura co-starred in the Japanese film remake of the 2011 South Korean film Sunny, portraying Wataru Fujii, as well as the film A Banana? At This Time of Night? He was cast as Sato in the live-action film adaptation of the novel Eine Klein Nachtmusik, which was released in 2019 and also screened internationally under the title Little Nights, Little Love. He also appeared in Gintama 2 as Kamotarō Itō. On television, Miura became a co-host for the travel program Sekai wa Hoshii Mono ni Afureteru: Tabi Suru Buyer Gokujō List with Juju. For the fall 2018 season of Yo ni mo Kimyō na Monogatari, Miura starred in the episode "Asu e no Warp" as Mineo Kobayashi, as well as Makoto Ameku in episode 1 of the television mini-series Tourist. He starred in the television drama Dying Eye as Shinsuke Amemura.

In early 2019, Miura was cast in the film The Confidence Man JP as Jesse, which released later in the year. He starred in the Japanese stage production of Crime and Punishment as Rodion Romanovich Raskolnikov. He reprised his role as Lola for the 2019 re-run of the Japanese production of Kinky Boots. In April 2019, Miura was cast as Daichi Yūki in the television drama, Two Weeks, as his first kayōku (Tuesday 9 PM) drama. In June 2019, Miura announced he was releasing his debut single, "Fight for Your Heart", as the theme song for Two Weeks. "Fight for Your Heart" released on August 7, 2019, charting at #12 on the Oricon Weekly Singles Chart and #34 on the Billboard Japan Hot 100 on its first week of release. Miura also won the Asia Star Award at the Seoul International Drama Awards for his performance in Two Weeks. In November 2019, Miura was cast in the live-action film adaptation of the manga Brave: Gunjō Senki as Matsudaira Motoyasu.

Miura reprised his role as Jesse for The Confidence Man JP: Episode of the Princess. In March 2020, he was cast as Hiroyuki Ishimura in the television drama Gift of Fire, which was set to broadcast in August 2020, and reprised his role for the series' film continuation. In the same month, he released his fifth photobook, Nihonsei, in two different versions, with one version including a documentary photobook. He co-starred in the Japanese stage production of Whistle Down the Wind as The Man, which ran from March 7 to April 23, 2020. On his 30th birthday on April 5, 2020, he revealed on an Instagram live-stream that he was releasing "Night Diver" as his second single in early Q3 2020, which contained three songs from different genres including a dance song and a love song. He also stated that he composed and wrote the lyrics for "You & I", one of the B-side tracks, and "Night Diver" was later set to debut on Music Station on July 24, 2020. He was set to have his first concert events in Q4 2020, but they were cancelled due to the COVID-19 pandemic and were planned to be live-streamed instead. He co-starred in the television drama Love Will Begin When Money End, which will be broadcast in September 2020, and was also cast as Eisenheim in the musical The Illusionist, which was set to run in December 2020. Godai: The Wunderkind was released posthumously on December 11, 2020. While the period drama was shot in October and November 2019, Miura was not able to see the final version. On December 27, 2021, he was awarded the 34th Nikkan Sports Yujiro Ishihara Film Prize Fans' Choice Award for Best Actor for his lead role in the film as Godai: The Wunderkind.

== Personal life ==
Miura attended Horikoshi High School and graduated in 2009. From September 2016 until November 2017, Miura dated choreographer Koharu Sugawara. From 2016 to 2020, Miura participated in the charity event Act Against Aids. In 2017, he briefly studied abroad in London.

== Death ==
On July 18, 2020, at 1:35 pm (JST), Miura was found unresponsive after hanging himself in his closet at his home in Minato, Tokyo. His body was discovered by his manager, who had been ready to pick him up for work and then checked up on him after he did not respond to the messages, phone calls, or doorbell sounds. He was rushed to the hospital where he was pronounced dead at 2:10 pm. Police believe Miura died by suicide, as an apparent suicide note was found in his room. The note, which was written in Miura's notebook, was undated, but he expressed anxiety and thoughts about dying. Miura's friends have stated he showed no signs of being suicidal prior to his death. Media news outlets linked it to cyberbullying and hate comments on social media, but Miura's friends and colleagues partially or completely refuted the claims.

NHK reported on July 20, 2020, that Miura's funeral and burial services had already been held. While fans paid tribute to Miura by leaving flowers outside of his condominium, his agency, Amuse Inc., announced that they will be setting up an opportunity for fans to pay respects while taking into consideration the COVID-19 pandemic. After the official website for Sekai wa Hoshii Mono ni Afureteru: Tabi Suru Buyer Gokujō List, the travel program Miura had co-hosted since its first broadcast in 2018, posted a statement offering condolences to Miura, this led many users on Twitter to tweet messages addressed to him using the hashtag "SekaiWaHoshiiMonoNiAfureteru" (#世界はほしいモノにあふれてる).

Miura's second single, "Night Diver", was released posthumously on August 24, 2020, with it pre-released digitally on July 25, 2020. Miura's debut single, "Fight for Your Heart", re-entered the music charts, peaking at No. 7 on Oricon Daily Singles Ranking. Gift of Fire and The Illusionist, two upcoming projects that Miura co-starred in, were put on hold. Miura's role as Eisenheim in The Illusionist was recast to Naoto Kaiho, who was originally cast as Prince Leopold.

== Filmography ==
=== Film ===
Year	Title	Role	Notes	Ref(s)
1999	Nile	Umi Nishiyama		
1999	Jubaku: Spellbound	Kōichi Kitano		
2001	Thousand Years of Love – The Tale of Shining Genji	Tō no Chūjō (young)		
2002	Mori no Gakkō	Masao Kawai		
2006	Catch a Wave	Taiyō Sasaki	Lead role	
2006	Akihabara@Deep	Izumu		
2007	Koizora	Hiroki Sakurai		
2007	Negative Happy Chainsaw Edge	Noto		
2008	Naoko	Yusuke Iki		
2009	Crows Zero 2	Tatsuya Bitō		
2009	Gokusen: The Movie	Ren Kazama		
2010	Kimi ni Todoke	Shota Kazehaya	Lead role	
2011	Tokyo Park	Koji Shida	Lead role	
2013	Harlock: Space Pirate	Yama	Lead role; voice	
2013	The Eternal Zero	Kentaro Saeki		
2014	Five Minutes to Tomorrow	Ryo	Lead role	
2015	Attack on Titan	Eren Jaeger	Lead role	
2015	Attack on Titan: End of the World	Eren Jaeger	Lead role	
2018	Sunny: Our Hearts Beat Together	Wataru Fujii		
2018	A Banana? At This Time of Night?	Hisashi Tanaka		
2018	Gintama 2	Kamotarō Itō		
2019	The Confidence Man JP	Jesse		
2019	Little Nights, Little Love	Sato	Lead role	
2020	The Confidence Man JP: Episode of the Princess	Jesse	Released posthumously	
2020	Godai - The Wunderkind	Tomoatsu Godai	Lead role; released posthumously	
2021	Brave: Gunjō Senki	Matsudaira Motoyasu	Released posthumously	
2021	Gift of Fire	Hiroyuki Ishimura	Lead role; released posthumously	

=== Television ===
Year	Title	Role	Network	Notes	Ref(s)
1997	Agri	Shōtarō	NHK	Asadora	
2000	Manatsu no Merry Christmas	Ryo Kinoshita (young)	TBS		
2001	Fujisawa Shuhei no Ninjū Shigure Machi 3: Jidaigeki Roman	Chōta	NHK		
2003	Musashi	Jōtarō	NHK	Taiga drama	
2005	Division 1 Aozora Koi Hoshi	Keita Ishikawa	Fuji TV	Episode 11	
2005	Fight	Kiyoshi Okabe	NHK	Asadora	
2005	Ima, Ai ni Yukimasu	Akihiro Kudō	TBS		
2006	Unfair	Yutaka Saitō	Fuji TV		
2006	Kōmyō ga Tsuji	Shōnan Sōke	NHK	Taiga drama	
2006	Children	Shirō Kihara	Wowow		
2006	Mother at Fourteen	Satoshi Kirino	NTV		
2008	Binbō Danshi	Ryo Shiraishi	NTV		
2008	Gokusen	Ren Kazama	NTV	Season 3	
2008	Galileo	Manabu Yukawa (young)	Fuji TV	Special episode	
2008	Bloody Monday	Fujimaru Takagi	TBS	Lead role	
2009	Samurai High School	Kotaro Mochizuki	NTV	Lead role	
2010	Bloody Monday Season 2: Zetsubo no Kushige	Fujimaru Takagi	TBS	Lead role	
2011	Taisetsu na Koto wa Subete Kimi ga Oshiete Kureta	Shūji Kashiwagi	Fuji TV	Lead role	
2011	Yo ni mo Kimyō na Monogatari	Kensuke Sanada	Fuji TV	2011 spring season; episode: "Janken"	
2011	Saigo no Bansan: Keiji Tōno Kazuyuki to 7-nin no Yōgisha	Eiji Miyata	TV Asahi	Cameo	
2011	Hi wa Mata Noboru	Eiji Miyata	TV Asahi		
2012	Keigo Higashino Mysteries	Ryo Nakaoka	Fuji TV	Lead role; episode 8	
2013	Last Cinderella	Hiroto Saeki	Fuji TV	Lead role	
2014	Boku no Ita Jikan	Takuto Sawada	Fuji TV	Lead role	
2014	Satsujin Hensachi 70	Keisuke Miyahara	NTV	Lead role	
2016	Never Let Me Go	Tomohiko Doi	TBS		
2017	Naotora: The Lady Warlord	Ii Naochika	NHK	Taiga drama	
2017	Otona Koukou	Eito Arakawa	TV Asahi	Lead role	
2018	Sekai wa Hoshii Mono ni Afureteru: Tabi Suru Buyer Gokujō List	Himself	NHK	Co-host	
2018	Yo ni mo Kimyō na Monogatari	Mineo Kobayashi	Fuji TV	2018 fall season; episode: "Asu e no Warp"	
2018	Tourist	Makoto Ameku	TBS (ep 1), TV Tokyo (ep 2), Wowow (ep 3)	Lead role	
2018	Dying Eye	Shinsuke Amemura	Wowow	Lead role	
2019	Two Weeks	Daichi Yūki	Fuji TV	Lead role	
2020	Gift of Fire	Hiroyuki Ishimura	NHK	Lead role; released posthumously	
2020	Love Begins When the Money Ends	Keita Saruwatari	TBS	Miniseries; released posthumously	

=== Music video ===
Year	Artist	Song	Notes
2007	Greeeen	"Be Free"	
2008	Yuzu	"Umaku Ienai"	
2013	C&K	"Mikan Heart"	
2014	Nico Touches the Walls	"Bakemono"	
2017	Yu Takahashi	"Reportage"	

=== Theater ===
Year	Title	Role	Notes	Ref(s)
2009	Hoshi no Daichi ni Furu Namida	Boy		
2012	Kaitō Seven	Wild Upper		
2012	Zipang Punk: Goemon Rock III	Akechi Shinkuro	Guest performer	
2015	Orpheus Descending	Val Xavier	Lead role	
2016	Kinky Boots	Lola	Lead role	
2019	Crime and Punishment	Rodion Romanovich Raskolnikov	Lead role	
2020	Whistle Down the Wind	The Man	Lead role	
2020	The Illusionist	Eisenheim	Lead role; role recast to Naoto Kaiho posthumously	

=== DVDs ===
List of solo DVDs, with selected chart positions, sales figures and certifications
Title	Year	Details	Peak chart positions	Sales
Title	Year	Details	JPN	Sales
HT: NY no Chūshin, Nabe no Tsutsuku (HT～N.Y.の中心で、鍋をつつく～) (with Takeru Satoh)	2010	Released: February 17, 2010; Label: Amuse; Formats: DVD	5	JPN: 12,000
HT: Sekidō no Mashita de, Nabe no Tsutsuku (HT～赤道の真下で、鍋をつつく～) (with Takeru Satoh)	2011	Released: November 11, 2011; Label: Amuse; Formats: DVD	2	JPN: 14,000
"—" denotes releases that did not chart or were not released in that region.

== Discography ==
=== Singles ===
List of singles, with selected chart positions, sales figures and certifications
Title	Year	Peak chart positions		Sales	Album
Title	Year	JPN	JPN Hot	Sales	Album
"Fight for Your Heart"	2019	6	4	JPN: 55,332 (physical); JPN: 1,854 (download & streaming)	Non-album single
"Night Diver"	2020	2	2	JPN: 35,898 (download); JPN: 224,974 (physical)	Non-album single
"—" denotes releases that did not chart or were not released in that region.

== Publications ==
=== Photobooks ===
Year	Title	Publisher	ISBN
2007	Tabun (たぶん。)	Wani Books	ISBN 978-4-8470-4051-1
2008	Letters	Shufu to Seikatsu-sha	ISBN 978-4-3911-3695-1
2010	Switch	Magazine House	ISBN 978-4-8387-2042-2
2015	Fureru (ふれる)	Magazine House	ISBN 978-4-8387-2667-7
2020	Nihonsei (日本製)	Wani Books	ISBN 978-4-8470-8281-8 (regular version); ISBN 978-4-8470-8280-1 (with documentary photobook)

== Awards ==
Year	Award	Category	Nominated work	Result	Ref.
2008	31st Japan Academy Prize	Newcomer of the Year	Koizora	Won	
2009	2009 Elan d'or Awards	Newcomer of the Year	Himself	Won	
2009	63rd Mainichi Film Awards	Sponichi Grand Prix New Talent Award	Naoko	Won	
2014	51st Galaxy Award	Individual Award	Last Cinderella, Boku no Ita Jikan	Won	
2015	38th Japan Academy Prize	Best Supporting Actor	The Eternal Zero	Nominated	
2017	28th Japan Jewelry Best Dresser Award	—N/a	Himself	Won	
2017	24th Yomiuri Theater Award	Best Actor Award	Kinky Boots	Won	
2017	24th Yomiuri Theater Award	Haruko Sugimura Award	Kinky Boots	Won	
2019	Seoul International Drama Awards	Asia Star Award	Two Weeks	Won	
2021	34th Nikkan Sports Yujiro Ishihara Film Prize	Fans' Choice Award for Best Actor	Godai - The Wunderkind	Won	
