= Kiyoko Shibuya =

Japanese visual effects director

- 渋谷 紀世子
- Born: 1970 (age 55–56); Tokyo, Japan
- Occupations: Visual effects director; film producer; digital compositor
- Years active: 1993–present
- Employer: Shirogumi
- Awards: Academy Award for Best Visual Effects; 4 VFX-Japan Awards

Kiyoko Shibuya (渋谷 紀世子, Shibuya Kiyoko; born 1970) is a Japanese visual effects director and film producer. She has worked on all of acclaimed filmmaker Takashi Yamazaki's films to date and has received four VFX-Japan Awards for her efforts, along with an Academy Award for Best Visual Effects for Godzilla Minus One (2023), making Shibuya the first woman of color to win in this category.

== Life and career ==
Shibuya was born in 1970 in Tokyo. After watching Star Wars (1977) and Back to the Future (1985), she became engrossed in the production of special effects, which would later lead to her employment at the animation and visual effects studio Shirogumi. In 1993, Shibuya began working in digital compositing on the Juzo Itami-directed film The Last Dance. Thereafter, she has participated in the creation of visual effects for various advertisements and movies at Shirogumi's studio in Chōfu, Tokyo.

Shibuya has worked on every film directed by Takashi Yamazaki, notably serving as the visual effects director for Juvenile (2000), Returner (2002), Always: Sunset on Third Street (2005), Always: Sunset on Third Street 2 (2007), Space Battleship Yamato (2010), Always: Sunset on Third Street '64 (2012), The Eternal Zero (2013), Parasyte: Part 1 (2014), Parasyte: Part 2 (2015), A Man Called Pirate (2016) and Godzilla Minus One (2023). She also produced Yamazaki's animated features Friends: Mononoke Shima no Naki (2011), Stand by Me Doraemon (2014), Dragon Quest: Your Story (2019), and Stand by Me Doraemon 2 (2020). Shibuya will make her visual effects supervisor credit debut on Godzilla Minus Zero (2026) with Takayuki Ueki and Eishin Okubo.

== Filmography ==
=== As visual effects director ===
- Juvenile (2000)
- Returner (2002)
- Always: Sunset on Third Street (2005)
- Always: Sunset on Third Street 2 (2007)
- K-20: Legend of the Mask (2008)
- Ballad (2009)
- Space Battleship Yamato (2010)
- Always: Sunset on Third Street '64 (2012)
- The Eternal Zero (2013)
- Parasyte: Part 1 (2014)
- Parasyte: Part 2 (2015)
- A Man Called Pirate (2016)
- Destiny: The Tale of Kamakura (2017)
- The Great War of Archimedes (2019)
- Yokaipedia (2022)
- Godzilla Minus One (2023)

=== As producer ===
- Friends: Mononoke Shima no Naki (2011)
- Stand by Me Doraemon (2014)
- Dragon Quest: Your Story (2019)
- Stand by Me Doraemon 2 (2020)
- Godzilla the Ride: Giant Monsters Ultimate Battle (2021) - visual effects

=== As visual effects supervisor ===
- Godzilla Minus Zero (2026) [with Takayuki Ueki and Eishin Okubo]

== Awards ==
Shibuya has received four VFX-JAPAN Awards, for her work on Takashi Yamazaki's Always: Sunset on Third Street '64 (2012), The Eternal Zero (2013), A Man Called Pirate (2016), and Destiny: The Tale of Kamakura (2017). She also won Best Visual Effects at the North Carolina Film Critics Association Awards and Seattle Film Critics Society Awards for her work on Godzilla Minus One (2023). She has also won, alongside Yamazaki, Masaki Takahashi, and Tatsuji Nojima, the Academy Award for Best Visual Effects at the 96th Academy Awards for her work on Godzilla Minus One.
