= Takashi Yamazaki =

Japanese filmmaker (born 1964)

- Yamazaki at the 2026 New York Film Festival
- Born: June 12, 1964 (age 62); Matsumoto, Nagano, Japan
- Occupations: Film director; screenwriter; visual effects supervisor
- Years active: 1984–present
- Organizations: Shirogumi; Robot Communications
- Spouse: Shimako Satō (m. 2012)
- Awards: Academy Award for Best Visual Effects; Japan Academy Film Prize for Director of the Year; Japan Academy Film Prize for Screenplay of the Year

Takashi Yamazaki (山崎 貴, Yamazaki Takashi; born June 12, 1964) is a Japanese filmmaker and visual effects supervisor. Known for his blockbusters featuring advanced visual effects, he is considered a leading figure in the Japanese film industry. Yamazaki is the recipient of multiple accolades, including an Academy Award, eight Japanese Academy Awards, five Nikkan Sports Film Awards, two Hochi Film Awards, and an Asian Film Award. His films have collectively grossed over $560 million worldwide.

Yamazaki found employment at visual effects and animation studio Shirogumi in 1986, and has remained there throughout his career. His first directorial features were the science fiction films Juvenile (2000) and Returner (2002), for which he became known as the "Japanese James Cameron". He later gained further notice in Japan by directing film adaptations of popular anime, novels, and manga, including Always: Sunset on Third Street (2005), Space Battleship Yamato (2010), The Eternal Zero (2013), and Stand by Me Doraemon (2014). The latter two films ranked as the highest-grossing Japanese live-action and animated releases, respectively, at the 2014 box office, and together earned a total of nine awards at the 38th Japan Academy Film Prize. Yamazaki's career continued with other film adaptations such as Parasyte: Part 1 (also 2014) and Part 2 (2015), Fueled: The Man They Called Pirate (2016), The Great War of Archimedes, Dragon Quest: Your Story, Lupin III: The First (all 2019), and Stand by Me Doraemon 2 (2020).

His 2023 kaiju epic, Godzilla Minus One, became the most successful Japanese Godzilla film of all time and one of his highest-grossing films. Yamazaki and the visual effects team also became the first Japanese crew ever to receive the Academy Award for Best Visual Effects. In 2024, Yamazaki was included in Gold House's annual list of 100 Most Impactful Asians. He has since made the Minus One sequel Godzilla Minus Zero (2026), and is developing his first Hollywood productions: Grandgear (2028) and Nue.

== Early life ==
Takashi Yamazaki was born on June 12, 1964, in Matsumoto, Nagano, to Yoshisuke Yamazaki, a baker, and Kikuko. He has a younger sister named Satsuki. Yamazaki has said his parents let him pursue whatever interested him: "My parents raised me by letting me do what I wanted freely. I think that has shaped a big part of who I am today".

He grew up surrounded by nature and developed a childhood interest in insects, lizards, and crafts, preferring drawing paper to conventional toys; he once requested 100 sheets of drawing paper as a Christmas present. Neither parent worked in the arts, though Yamazaki said his father Yoshisuke drew well and would sketch characters such as Ultraman when asked. During his elementary school years, a teacher in the upper grades encouraged students to fill notebooks with anything they liked—for Yamazaki, it was kaiju designs, science-fiction ideas, and observations of insects—and praised the results, which Yamazaki later credited with reinforcing his confidence in creative work.

Yamazaki was first introduced to film by the "Umbrella Program" as a child; in 2023 he reflected that Ishirō Honda's Matango (1963) and King Kong vs. Godzilla (1962) may have been among the earliest movies he ever saw. Ghidorah, the Three-Headed Monster (1964) was the first Godzilla movie he saw in theaters, during its 1971 re-release; Yamazaki begged his father to let him go see it as his hometown Matsumoto appears in the film. At about age 13, Star Wars and Close Encounters of the Third Kind (both 1977) became decisive influences. He has described the mothership sequence in Close Encounters, in which the ship flips over, as the first time visual effects gave him the illusion that what he was seeing was real.

In the summer of 1979, during his third year at Matsumoto Shiritsu Shimizu Junior High School, Yamazaki and about ten of his classmates shot an 8 mm science-fiction short titled Glory (グローリー), which he directed and starred in. The story follows a crew searching for a habitable planet after Earth becomes uninhabitable and later learning of Earth's destruction. He built miniature spacecraft from plastic models and filmed at local sites, including the Utsukushigahara highlands to which the group traveling by bicycle. The short was screened at the school's cultural festival and drew large crowds; a teacher defended the screening when other staff complained about it. Yamazaki was preparing for entrance exams at the time and thus decided to keep his work on the project a secret from his parents. The film was lost for more than 40 years until a local citizens' group rediscovered it in June 2022 and screened it again in Matsumoto with Yamazaki and former classmates.

== Career ==
=== 1984–1999: Early career ===
In 1984, Yamazaki began working as a miniature builder for Tatsuo Shimamura. Following his graduation from Asagaya College of Art and Design in 1986, he officially became an employee at Shimamura's animation and special effects studio Shirogumi in Chōfu, Tokyo. In 2026, Yamazaki confirmed on social media that he had worked on the puppets for the original cover art of the 1993 game Star Fox.

After working on the Eko Eko Azarak series and Parasite Eve (1997), Yamazaki and his team at Shirogumi started pre-production on their feature Nue. The team spent two years preparing the project in collaboration with Robot Communications and they even went location scouting in Australia. Yamazaki, who was still heading the visual effects for up to three commercials monthly at this point, concluded that the film would require him to create the film on a relatively enormous budget of ¥2 billion, well above the average budget of ¥100 million usually given to first-time directors. Thus, Robot president Shūji Abe deemed Nue too expensive and requested that Yamazaki scrap it and attempt to make his directorial debut with a smaller scale.

Yamazaki also contributed to the TV Tokyo drama series Nanase Futatabi: Chōnōryokusha Kanzen Massatsu (1998), directing the first half of the episode "Mental Forces". Set in a time when psychics are being systematically eliminated, this segment depicted a time traveler rescuing the heroine from a sniper attack. Kei Shichiri directed the second half.

=== 2000–2007: First directorial features and breakthrough ===
Shortly after abandoning Nue, Yamazaki converted the idea for his debut feature film, Juvenile (2000), which he directed, wrote, and headed the visual effects for. A science fiction film, Juvenile is about a group of elementary school students who find a talking alien robot while camping in the woods and soon discover that it is their only hope in saving the planet from incoming evil alien invaders. Initially, Juvenile was to be shot on entirely on location by Kōzō Shibasaki under Yamazaki's direction on a budget of roughly ¥100 million, with Kiyoko Shibuya directing the visual effects on a budget of ¥50 million under Yamazaki's supervision. However, Abe decided to increase the film's budget to ¥450 million in order to allow Yamazaki to make it a "proper movie for the summer vacation lineup". Toho distributed Juvenile in July 2000 and it grossed ¥1.1 billion, making it the fifteenth highest-grossing Japanese film of that year. It was also shown at the 2000 Giffoni Film Festival.

His next film, the science fiction actioner Returner (2002), follows the story of Milly, a young woman living in a war-torn future, who is recruited by a mysterious time traveler named Miyamoto. The film was distributed by Toho in Japan on August 31, 2002 and was later in American theaters in October of the following year, where it was critically savaged. Western critics accused Yamazaki of plagiarising from popular American science fiction films such as Close Encounters of the Third Kind (1977), E.T. the Extra-Terrestrial (1982), The Terminator (1984), and The Matrix (1999). After its release, Yamazaki proposed a sequel to Returner but Abe asked him to make a film set in the Shōwa era instead.

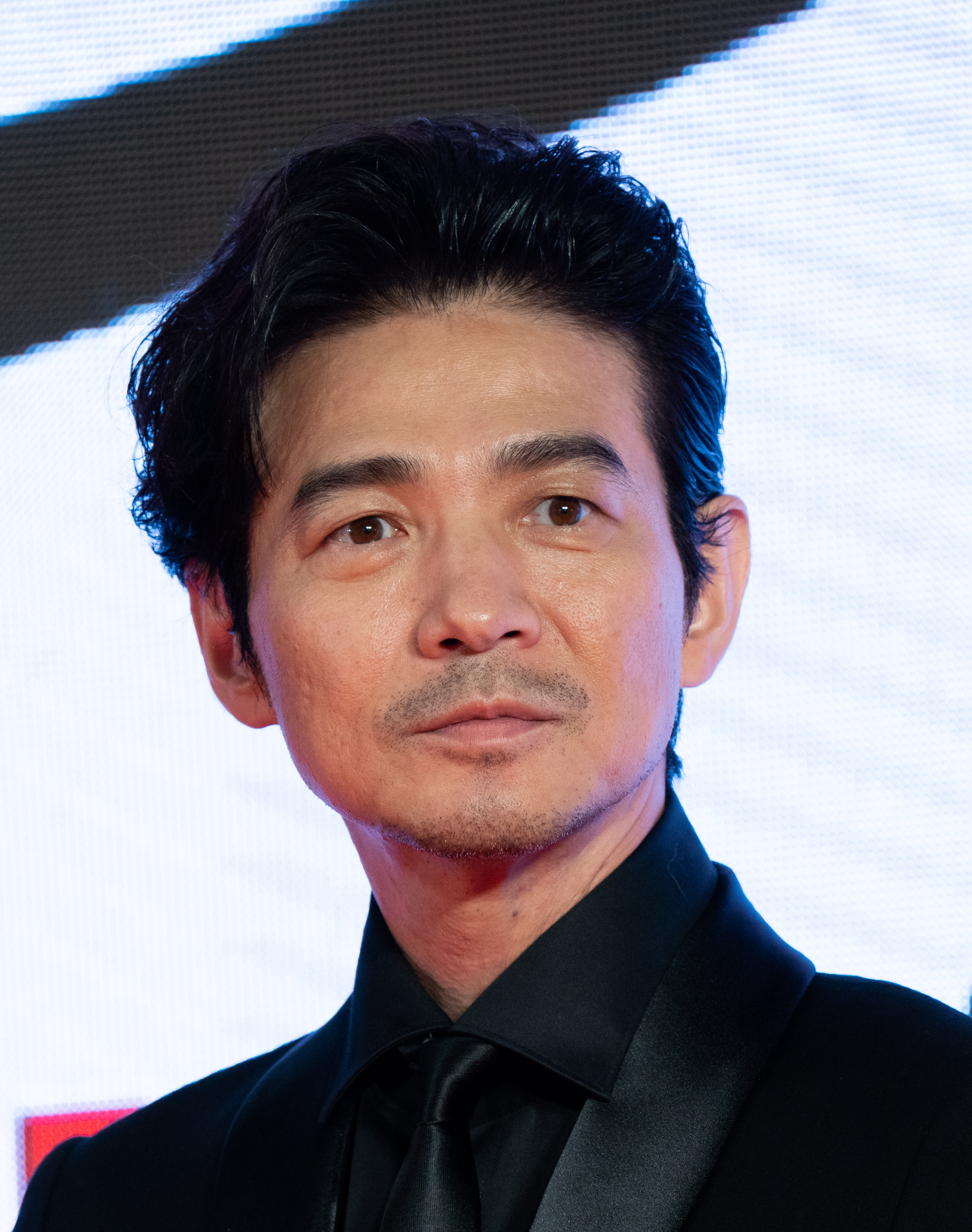
Hidetaka Yoshioka, a frequent lead in Yamazaki's films

Yamazaki's breakthrough came when he departed from the science fiction genre to create his third directorial feature, Always: Sunset on Third Street (2005), an adaptation Ryōhei Saigan's manga series Sunset on Third Street. Set in Tokyo during postwar Japan, this film tells the "heartwarming" story of the residents living at Third Street: Ryunosuke, a writer from the countryside; Norifumi, an auto mechanic; and sake bar owner Hiromi. Always: Sunset on Third Street – starring Hidetaka Yoshioka, Shinichi Tsutsumi, Koyuki, Maki Horikita, and Kenta Suga – was released to overwhelmingly positive reviews and grossed ¥3.23 billion, ranking fifteenth at the Japanese box office. In 2005, film critic Tadao Satō regarded the film as a milestone in the usage for computer-generated imagery and acclaimed Yamazaki's direction. At the 29th Japanese Academy Awards, the film won twelve awards, including Best Picture and Best Director.

Yamazaki next directed, co-wrote (with Ryota Kosawa), and headed the visual effects for Always: Sunset on Third Street 2 (2007), a sequel to Always: Sunset on Third Street also based on the manga series. The film opens with an "imaginary sequence" of Godzilla attacking Tokyo before returning to the story of the residents of Third Street. Yamazaki stated that he is a lifelong fan of the Godzilla franchise and incorporated the opening scene in order to "start with something fresh from the first film" and added that "having Godzilla destroy Tokyo Tower with his oral beam was a great way to surprise audiences". He also noted that the "two minutes (in which Godzilla appears) required a tremendous amount of work", with half of the crew having to work on the sequence over the course of six months. Upon its November 3 release, Always: Sunset on Third Street 2 became Yamazaki's biggest box office hit, ranking the third-highest-grosser at Japanese box office that year.

=== 2008–2019: Directing film adaptations ===
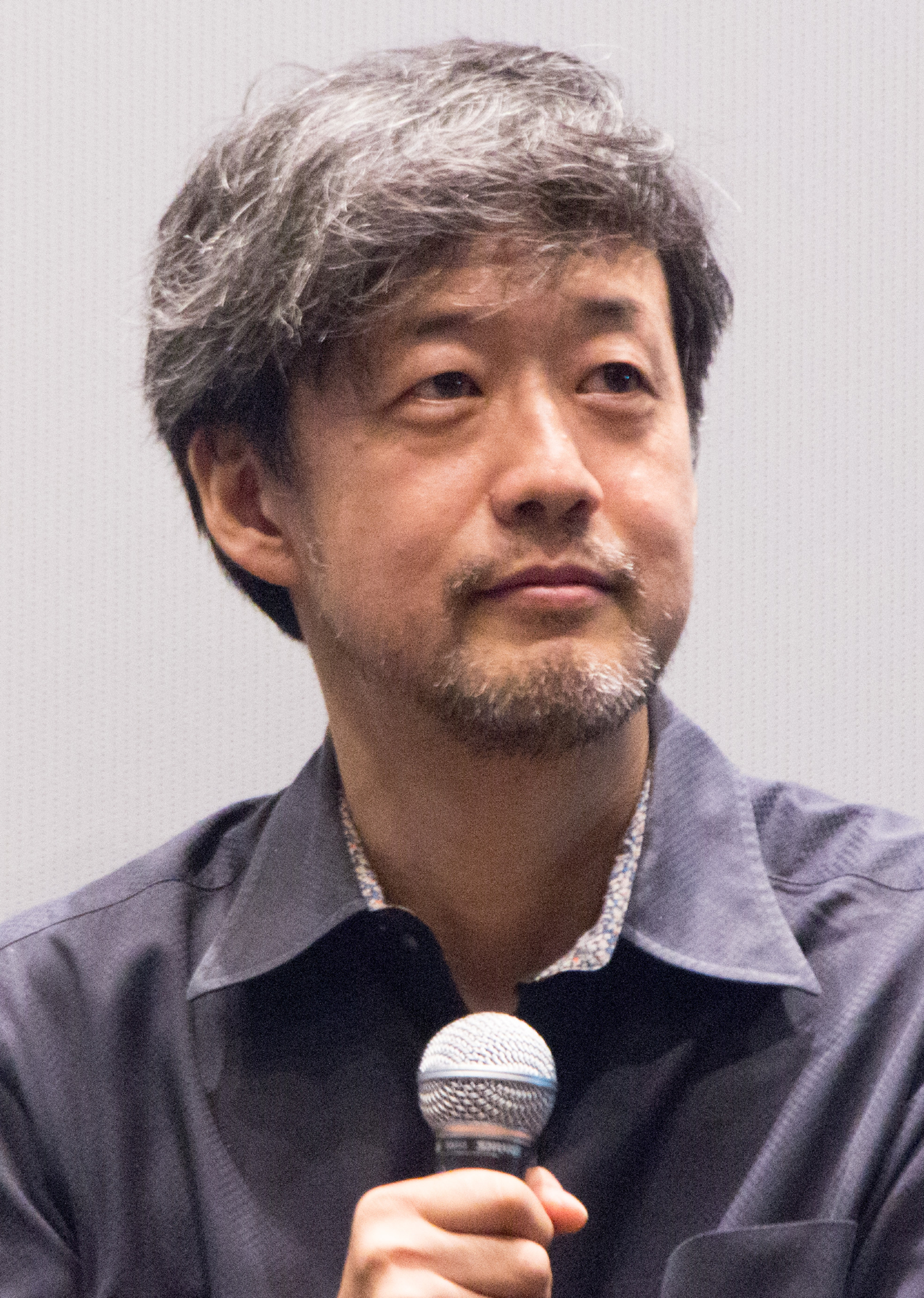
Yamazaki in October 2016

In 2008, Yamazaki turned to assisting his fellow Asagaya College of Art and Design graduate and future wife, Shimako Satō, with the visual effects and screenplay for her action film, K-20: Legend of the Mask. Based on a novel by Sō Kitamura, K-20 is set in an alternate reality version of Japan during the 1940s and follows the mysterious masked antihero known as "K-20" who robs the rich and powerful, leaving behind a trail of dismay. K-20 was released in December 2008 and grossed ¥2 billion, making it the eighteenth highest-grossing Japanese film of 2009.

In 2009, Yamazaki created the visual effects for Yōjirō Takita's Sanpei The Fisher Boy – based on the manga Fisherman Sanpei – and directed, wrote and made the effects for the live-action jidaigeki romance film Ballad– based on the 2002 anime feature Crayon Shin-chan: Fierceness That Invites Storm! The Battle of the Warring States –. Yamazaki was inspired to create Ballad after visiting the filming location of The Last Samurai (2003) and contemplating "Maybe Japan could make a historical drama centered around battles?".

In October 2009, Yamazaki started filming his first science fiction film since 2002's Returner, Space Battleship Yamato. Featuring a screenplay by his partner Shimako Satō, it is an adaptation of famed manga artist Leiji Matsumoto's 1974 anime series of the same name. With a budget estimated at ¥2 billion ($22–23.9 million) and CGI used in 80% of the entire picture, it was anticipated to become an "unprecedented science fiction blockbuster", and Toho spent an additional ¥100 million on New Years Day alone to promote the film and ensure it met their expectations. Space Battleship Yamato was released in Japan during December 2010 and grossed ¥4.1 billion.

The first animated to be co-directed by Yamazaki and Ryūichi Yagi, Friends: Naki on Monster Island, was released in Japanese theaters in December 2011. Loosely based on Hirosuke Hamada's children's book Naita Aka Oni, the film is about a monster named Naki who is protecting a young boy, whom they found lost on the Monster Island, from the other, man-eating, monsters. The film was nominated for an Japan Academy Film Prize and VFX Japan Award two years after its initial release.

Always: Sunset on Third Street '64, the sequel to Always: Sunset on Third Street 2, was Yamazaki's next venture. At the film's premiere screening on January 17, 2012, Yamazaki said that "it was very difficult to make this movie" but nevertheless expressed his desire for a sequel set during Expo '70.

Next, Yamazaki directed, co-wrote, and supervised the visual effects for The Eternal Zero (2013), a live-action World War II historical drama adapted from Naoki Hyakuta's 2006 novel. The film follows a young man in 2004 investigating the life of his grandfather, a skilled Zero fighter pilot during World War II who ultimately became a kamikaze. It was released in Japan on December 21, 2013 and became a major commercial success, grossing approximately ¥8.76 billion ($84.5 million), and ranking as the highest-grossing live-action Japanese film at the 2014 box office.

The Eternal Zero received widespread attention and some controversy for its subject matter and the source material's nationalist associations. Yamazaki remarked: "The film depicts the war as a complete tragedy, so how can you say it glorifies war?... I really don't get it." Then-Prime Minister of Japan Shinzō Abe praised the film, saying that he and his wife were deeply moved by it. At the 38th Japan Academy Film Prize, the film won eight awards, including Picture of the Year and Director of the Year for Yamazaki. It also won the audience award at the Far East Film Festival.

Yamazaki then moved on to co-direct (with Yagi) and write the screenplay for Stand by Me Doraemon, the first fully computer-animated feature film in the long-running Doraemon franchise. Based on selected chapters from Fujiko F. Fujio's manga, it recounts the arrival of the robotic cat Doraemon from the future to help the awkward schoolboy Nobita Nobi. Released by Toho on August 8, 2014, the film was a major box-office hit in Japan, grossing over ¥8 billion domestically and becoming the highest-grossing Japanese animated film of the year. It won the Japan Academy Prize for Animation of the Year at the 38th ceremony (the same year Yamazaki's own The Eternal Zero also dominated the live-action categories). A sequel, also co-directed by Yamazaki and Yagi, followed in 2020.

In November 2013, it announced Yamazaki would helm a two-part live-action adaptation of Hitoshi Iwaaki's science-fiction horror manga Parasyte. Starring Shōta Sometani as high-school student Shinichi Izumi, who forms an uneasy alliance with an alien parasite (Migi) that invades his right hand, the films depict humanity's struggle against body-snatching parasites. Part 1 was released on November 29, 2014, and Part 2 on April 25, 2015, both distributed by Toho. Part 1 received a nomination for Best Visual Effects at the Asian Film Awards, and was noted for its blend of gore, action, and philosophical themes extending those from the source material.

Yamazaki directed and wrote Fueled: The Man They Called Pirate (2016), a biographical drama based on another novel by Hyakuta, writer of The Eternal Zero, this one being about oil entrepreneur Sazō Idemitsu (fictionalized as Tetsuzō Kunioka). The film, starring Junichi Okada, portrays the protagonist's efforts to rebuild and expand his company in the difficult post-World War II period through bold and unconventional business dealings. It was released on December 10, 2016.

Returning to the work of manga artist Ryōhei Saigan, creator of Sunset on Third Street, Yamazaki made the feature adaptation Destiny: The Tale of Kamakura (2017). The fantasy-comedy-drama stars Masato Sakai as mystery writer Masakazu Isshiki and Mitsuki Takahata as his wife Akiko; the couple lives in Kamakura, where humans coexist with yokai, spirits, and other supernatural beings. When Akiko mysteriously disappears, Masakazu embarks on a journey into the afterlife. Released on December 9, 2017, the film was a box office success in Japan and China, ranking among the highest-grossing Japanese films of 2017. Critics also praised its imaginative visual effects and whimsical tone.

In July 2018, the production of Yamazaki's next film The Great War of Archimedes was announced; based on a manga by Norifusa Mita, this picture about the building of the battleship Yamato, and starred Masaki Suda in his first collaboration with Yamazaki. It was released by in July 2019, and was the sixteenth highest-grossing Japanese film of 2019.

Yamazaki served as chief director (with co-directors Ryūichi Yagi and Makoto Hanafusa) and screenwriter on the computer-animated film Dragon Quest: Your Story, an adaptation of the 1992 video game Dragon Quest V. Supervised by series creator Yuji Horii and featuring music by Koichi Sugiyama, it follows the protagonist Luca's multi-generational quest. Released on August 2, 2019, the film grossed approximately $11 million in Japan.

Yamazaki directed and wrote the first fully computer-animated feature film in the Lupin the Third franchise, Lupin III: The First (2019). Produced by TMS Entertainment and Marza Animation Planet, it follows the gentleman thief Lupin III and his gang as they pursue the Bresson Diary, a treasure sought by Nazis, while teaming up with a young archaeologist. The film was noted for its stylish action, homage to Hayao Miyazaki's The Castle of Cagliostro, and successful transition of the classic characters into CG animation. It received international distribution, including by GKIDS in the United States.

=== 2019–present: Godzilla and other activities ===
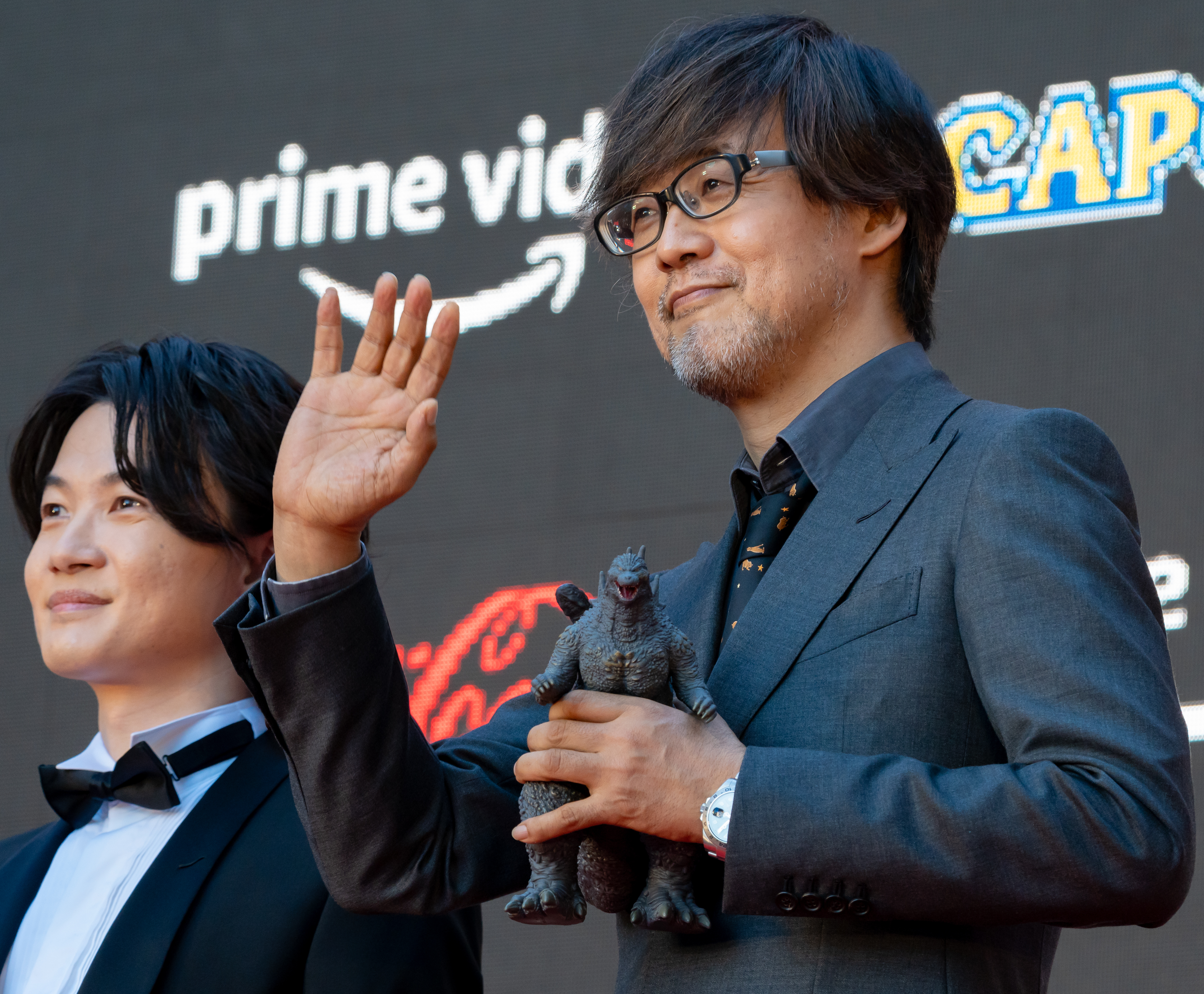
Yamazaki (right) with Godzilla Minus One star Ryunosuke Kamiki at the 36th Tokyo International Film Festival in October 2024.

After the release of The Great War of Archimedes, Yamazaki was given the opportunity to make a Godzilla film by Toho executive and film producer Minami Ichikawa. Ichikawa stated that he and Yamazaki decided to collaborate on the project, entitled Godzilla Minus One, just before the COVID-19 pandemic and Yamazaki spent three years writing the screenplay.

In the meantime, Yamazaki also directed, wrote, and supervised visual effects for Yokaipedia (released in Japan as Ghost Book / Obakezukan), a live-action fantasy adventure loosely based on Hiroshi Saito's children's picture-book series Ghost Book. The story follows schoolchildren who obtain a mysterious “Ghost Book” that grants wishes but draws them into a world of yokai. Starring child actors alongside Yui Aragaki and Ryunosuke Kamiki, it was released by Toho on July 22, 2022.

Yamazaki's Godzilla Minus One was released in Japanese theaters in November 2023, and became one of the most acclaimed films in the franchise. For their work on the film, Yamazaki and his team became the first Japanese film to ever to receive an Academy Award nomination for Best Visual Effects, ultimately winning. Yamazaki himself was among the recipients of the Academy Award.

On December 27, 2023, Yamazaki began directing a kaiju web film in Ashikaga, Tochigi for a major food corporation, scheduled for a March 2024 release with a runtime of approximately one minute. Its visual effects were also made by the same team behind Godzilla Minus One. It was later revealed to be titled Foodlosslla (フードロスラ, Fūdo Rosura) and produced by Ajinomoto.

Yamazaki declared in February 2024 that he has a new film in development. The following month, Variety reported that Yamazaki had recently enlisted with the American talent agency Creative Artists Agency (CAA); the agreement could potentially help Yamazaki to be employed for Hollywood productions. At Godzilla Fest in November, he disclosed that he had declined several offers in order to helm another Godzilla film. Deadline later reported that Yamazaki is set to make his Hollywood debut with Grandgear for Bad Robot and Sony Pictures. In addition to writing and directing the film, he will also serve as a producer alongside J. J. Abrams and Glen Zipper.

In July 2026, it was announced that Yamazaki would direct Nue, an original science fiction epic for 20th Century Studios, with Ridley Scott producing through his Scott Free Productions banner. Yamazaki initially planned Nue as his debut film in the late 1990s, but it was cancelled; he has described the project as fulfilling "a lifelong dream" of his.

== Personal life ==
In 2012, Yamazaki married fellow filmmaker Shimako Satō, whom he had met at Asagaya College of Art and Design in the 1980s. The couple own several cats, one of which influenced Yamazaki while making Godzilla Minus One.

== Filmography ==
=== Films ===
Film work by Takashi Yamazaki
Year	Title	Director	Writer	Effects		Notes	Ref.
Year	Title	Director	Writer	Visual	Special	Notes	Ref.
1987	The Drifting Classroom	No	No	No	Yes		
1988	A Taxing Woman's Return	No	No	No	Yes		
1989	Sweet Home	No	No	No	Yes		
1993	Daibyonin	No	No	No	Yes	Also digital compositor	
1994	Uneasy Encounters	No	No	No	Yes	Also digital compositor	
1995	Eko Eko Azarak: Wizard of Darkness	No	No	No	Yes	Also digital compositor	
1995	A Quiet Life	No	No	No	Yes	Also digital compositor	
1996	Eko Eko Azarak II: Birth of the Wizard	No	No	No	Yes	Also digital compositor	
1996	Supermarket Woman	No	No	No	Yes	Also digital compositor	
1997	Parasite Eve	No	No	No	Yes	Also storyboarder	
2000	Juvenile	Yes	Yes	Yes	No		
2002	Returner	Yes	Yes	Yes	No		
2005	Always: Sunset on Third Street	Yes	Yes (Note: With Ryota Kosawa)	Yes	No		
2006	The iDol	No	Yes (Note: With Jiro Kaneko)	Yes	Yes	Also has a cameo	
2007	Always: Sunset on Third Street 2	Yes	Yes	Yes	No	Also Godzilla designer	
2008	K-20: Legend of the Mask	No	Associate	Associate	No		
2009	Ballad	Yes	Yes	Yes	No		
2010	Space Battleship Yamato	Yes	No	Yes	No		
2011	Friends: Naki on Monster Island	Yes	Yes	No	No		
2012	Always: Sunset on Third Street '64	Yes	Yes	Yes	No		
2013	The Eternal Zero	Yes	Yes (Note: With Tamio Hayashi)	Yes	No		
2014	Stand by Me Doraemon	Yes (Note: With Ryūichi Yagi)	Yes	No	No		
2014	Parasyte: Part 1	Yes	Yes	Yes	Yes		
2014	Bump of Chicken: Willpolis 2014	Yes (Note: With Shuichi Bamba)	No	No	No		
2015	Parasyte: Part 2	Yes	Yes	Yes	Yes		
2016	Fueled: The Man They Called Pirate	Yes	Yes	Yes	No		
2017	Destiny: The Tale of Kamakura	Yes	Yes	Yes	No		
2019	The Great War of Archimedes	Yes	Yes	Yes	No		
2019	Dragon Quest: Your Story	Yes (Note: With Ryuichi Yagi and Makoto Hanafusa)	Yes	No	No		
2019	Lupin III: The First	Yes	Yes	No	No		
2020	Stand by Me Doraemon 2	Yes	Yes	No	No		
2021	It's a Flickering Life	No	No	Yes	No		
2022	Ghost Book Obakezukan	Yes	Yes	Yes	No		
2023	Godzilla Minus One	Yes	Yes	Yes	No	Also Godzilla designer (Note: With Kosuke Taguchi)	
2026	Godzilla Minus Zero	Yes	Yes	Yes	No		
2028	Grandgear	Yes	Yes	Yes	No	Pre-production; first English-language debut; Also producer (Note: With J.J. Abrams and Glen Zipper)	
TBA	Nue	Yes	TBA			In development	

=== Television ===
- Nanase Futatabi: Chōnōryokusha Kanzen Massatsu (1998) - directed the first half of the episode "Mental Forces"
- Dōbutsu no Oisha-san (2003) - director for episodes 7 and 10
- Hatsukoi.com (2003) - director
- Moyasimon (2007) - opening sequence director
- Tales of the Unusual 25th Anniversary! Autumn 2-Week Special: ~Film Directors Edition~ (2015) - director of the episode "X"

=== Commercials ===
- Airs (2006) for Lotte
- "Commercial No. 2 / Live-action Evangelion edition" (2007) for CR Neon Genesis Evangelion: The Angels Are Back Again
- "The Story of Yoshinoya's First Tsukiji Store" (2016) for Yoshinoya
- "Foodlosslla" (2024) for Ajinomoto

=== Music videos ===
- Bump of Chicken: "Namida no Furusato" (2006)
- Bump of Chicken: "Good Luck" (2012)
- Bump of Chicken: "Parade" (2014)
- Bump of Chicken: "Colony" (2015)

=== Theme park attraction ===
- Godzilla the Ride: Giant Monsters Ultimate Battle - Seibu-en (2021)
- Ultraman the Ride: The Great Duel of the Century - Seibu-en (2023)
- Godzilla the Ride: Great Clash - Seibu-en (2025)

=== Video games ===
- Onimusha 3: Demon Siege (2004) - Opening CG movie director

== Awards and nominations ==
Year	Award	Category	Nominated work	Result	Ref.
2000	30th Giffoni Film Festival	Early Screens Section	Juvenile	Won	
2005	30th Hochi Film Awards	Best Picture	Always: Sunset on Third Street	Won	
2005	18th Nikkan Sports Film Awards	Yūjirō Ishihara Award	Always: Sunset on Third Street	Won	
2006	9th Far East Film Festival	Audience Award	Always: Sunset on Third Street	Nominated	
2006	29th Japan Academy Film Prize	Picture of the Year	Always: Sunset on Third Street	Won	
2006	29th Japan Academy Film Prize	Director of the Year	Always: Sunset on Third Street	Won	
2006	29th Japan Academy Film Prize	Screenplay of the Year	Always: Sunset on Third Street	Won	
2006	79th Kinema Junpo Awards	Readers' Choice Award	Always: Sunset on Third Street	Won	
2006	60th Mainichi Film Awards	Readers' Choice Award	Always: Sunset on Third Street	Won	
2006	60th Mainichi Film Awards	Technical Award	Always: Sunset on Third Street	Won	
2006	27th Yokohama Film Festival	Best Technical	Always: Sunset on Third Street	Won	
2006	27th New York Asian Film Festival	Audience Award	Always: Sunset on Third Street	Won	
2008	31st Japan Academy Film Prize	Picture of the Year	Always: Sunset on Third Street 2	Nominated	
2008	31st Japan Academy Film Prize	Director of the Year	Always: Sunset on Third Street 2	Nominated	
2008	31st Japan Academy Film Prize	Screenplay of the Year	Always: Sunset on Third Street 2	Nominated	
2008	2nd Asian Film Awards	Best Visual Effects	Always: Sunset on Third Street 2	Nominated	
2011	24th Nikkan Sports Film Awards	Readers' Choice Award	Space Battleship Yamato	Won	
2011	5th Asian Film Awards	Best Visual Effects	Space Battleship Yamato	Nominated	
2013	36th Japan Academy Film Prize	Animation of the Year	Friends: Naki on the Monster Island	Nominated	
2013	56th Blue Ribbon Awards	Best Film	The Eternal Zero	Nominated	
2014	38th Japan Academy Film Prize	Picture of the Year	The Eternal Zero	Won	
2014	38th Japan Academy Film Prize	Director of the Year	The Eternal Zero	Won	
2014	38th Japan Academy Film Prize	Screenplay of the Year	The Eternal Zero	Nominated	
2014	16th Far East Film Festival	Audience Award	The Eternal Zero	Won	
2014	27th Nikkan Sports Film Award	Best Film	The Eternal Zero	Won	
2014	27th Nikkan Sports Film Award	Best Director	The Eternal Zero and Stand by Me Doraemon	Won	
2014	38th Japan Academy Film Prize	Animation of the Year	Stand by Me Doraemon	Won	
2015	5th Asian Film Awards	Best Visual Effects	Parasyte: Part 1	Nominated	
2015	12th Nippon Connection Japanese Film Festival	Best Film	Parasyte: Part 1	Nominated	
2015	12th Nippon Connection Japanese Film Festival	Best Film	Parasyte: Part 2	Nominated	
2018	12th Nippon Connection Japanese Film Festival	Best Film	Destiny: The Tale of Kamakura	Nominated	
2019	44th Hochi Film Awards	Best Picture	The Great War of Archimedes	Nominated	
2019	32nd Nikkan Sports Film Awards	Yūjirō Ishihara Award	The Great War of Archimedes	Won	
2020	43rd Japan Academy Film Prize	Animation of the Year	Lupin III: The First	Nominated	
2020	42nd Annecy International Animated Film Festival	Best Feature Film	Lupin III: The First	Nominated	
2021	5th Hawaii Film Critics Society Awards	Best Animated Film	Lupin III: The First	Won	
2021	44th Japan Academy Film Prize	Animation of the Year	Stand by Me Doraemon 2	Nominated	
2023	36th Chicago Film Critics Association Awards	Best Use of Visual Effects	Godzilla Minus One	Won	
2023	36th Chicago Film Critics Association Awards	Best Foreign Language Film	Godzilla Minus One	Nominated	
2023	28th Florida Film Critics Circle Awards	Best Visual Effects	Godzilla Minus One	Won	
2023	28th Florida Film Critics Circle Awards	Best Foreign Language Film	Godzilla Minus One	Nominated	
2023	48th Hochi Film Awards	Best Picture	Godzilla Minus One	Nominated	
2023	48th Hochi Film Awards	Best Director	Godzilla Minus One	Won	
2023	15th Indiana Film Journalists Association Awards	Best Film	Godzilla Minus One	Nominated	
2023	15th Indiana Film Journalists Association Awards	Best Foreign Language Film	Godzilla Minus One	Runner-up	
2023	27th Las Vegas Film Critics Society Awards	Best Horror/Sci-Fi Movie	Godzilla Minus One	Won	
2023	27th Las Vegas Film Critics Society Awards	Best International Movie	Godzilla Minus One	Won	
2023	27th Las Vegas Film Critics Society Awards	Best Visual Effects	Godzilla Minus One	Nominated	
2023	27th Las Vegas Film Critics Society Awards	Best Action Movie	Godzilla Minus One	Nominated	
2023	36th Nikkan Sports Film Award	Yūjirō Ishihara Award	Godzilla Minus One	Nominated	
2023	7th Philadelphia Film Critics Circle Awards	Philips Steaks Cheesesteak Award	Godzilla Minus One	Runner-up	
2023	10th Phoenix Critics Circle Awards	Best Foreign Language Film	Godzilla Minus One	Nominated	
2023	20th St. Louis Gateway Film Critics Association Awards	Best Visual Effects	Godzilla Minus One	Nominated	
2024	96th Academy Awards	Best Visual Effects	Godzilla Minus One	Won	
2024	17th Asian Film Awards	Best Visual Effects	Godzilla Minus One	Won	
2024	19th Austin Film Critics Association Awards	Best Film	Godzilla Minus One	6th Place	
2024	19th Austin Film Critics Association Awards	Best International Film	Godzilla Minus One	Won	
2024	66th Blue Ribbon Awards	Best Film	Godzilla Minus One	Won	
2024	66th Blue Ribbon Awards	Best Director	Godzilla Minus One	Nominated	
2024	5th Chicago Indie Critics Awards	Best Visual Effects	Godzilla Minus One	Won	
2024	7th Columbus Film Critics Association Awards	Best Film	Godzilla Minus One	Nominated	
2024	7th Columbus Film Critics Association Awards	Best Foreign Language Film	Godzilla Minus One	Nominated	
2024	29th Critics' Choice Awards	Best Foreign Language Film	Godzilla Minus One	Nominated	
2024	16th Denver Film Critics Society Awards	Best Sci-Fi/Horror	Godzilla Minus One	Won	
2024	16th Denver Film Critics Society Awards	Best Visual Effects	Godzilla Minus One	Nominated	
2024	16th Denver Film Critics Society Awards	Best Non-English Language Feature	Godzilla Minus One	Won	
2024	5th DiscussingFilm Critic Awards	Best International Film	Godzilla Minus One	Runner-up	
2024	5th DiscussingFilm Critic Awards	Best Visual Effects	Godzilla Minus One	Won	
2024	13th Georgia Film Critics Association Awards	Best Picture	Godzilla Minus One	Nominated	
2024	13th Georgia Film Critics Association Awards	Best International Film	Godzilla Minus One	Won	
2024	6th Greater Western New York Film Critics Association Awards	Best Foreign Film	Godzilla Minus One	Nominated	
2024	22nd Gold Derby Film Awards	Best Visual Effects	Godzilla Minus One	Won	
2024	8th Hawaii Film Critics Society Awards	Best Visual Effects	Godzilla Minus One	Nominated	
2024	8th Hawaii Film Critics Society Awards	Best Horror Film	Godzilla Minus One	Nominated	
2024	8th Hawaii Film Critics Society Awards	Best Sci-Fi Film	Godzilla Minus One	Won	
2024	8th Hawaii Film Critics Society Awards	Best Foreign Language Film	Godzilla Minus One	Nominated	
2024	17th Houston Film Critics Society Awards	Best Picture	Godzilla Minus One	Nominated	
2024	17th Houston Film Critics Society Awards	Best Foreign Language Film	Godzilla Minus One	Nominated	
2024	17th Houston Film Critics Society Awards	Best Visual Effects	Godzilla Minus One	Nominated	
2024	47th Japan Academy Film Prize	Picture of the Year	Godzilla Minus One	Won	
2024	47th Japan Academy Film Prize	Best Director	Godzilla Minus One	Nominated	
2024	47th Japan Academy Film Prize	Best Screenplay	Godzilla Minus One	Won	
2024	59th Kansas City Film Critics Circle Awards	Best Science Fiction, Fantasy or Horror	Godzilla Minus One	Won	
2024	Latino Entertainment Journalists Association Awards	Best International Film	Godzilla Minus One	Nominated	
2024	Latino Entertainment Journalists Association Awards	Best Visual Effects	Godzilla Minus One	Nominated	
2024	78th Mainichi Film Awards	Excellence Award	Godzilla Minus One	Nominated	
2024	78th Mainichi Film Awards	Best Director	Godzilla Minus One	Nominated	
2024	6th Music City Film Critics' Association Awards	Best International Film	Godzilla Minus One	Won	
2024	6th Music City Film Critics' Association Awards	Best Action Film	Godzilla Minus One	Nominated	
2024	12nd North Carolina Film Critics Association Awards	Best Narrative Film	Godzilla Minus One	Nominated	
2024	12nd North Carolina Film Critics Association Awards	Best Foreign Language Film	Godzilla Minus One	Nominated	
2024	5th North Dakota Film Society Awards	Best Visual Effects	Godzilla Minus One	Nominated	
2024	27th Online Film Critics Society Awards	Best Visual Effects	Godzilla Minus One	Nominated	
2024	27th Online Film Critics Society Awards	Best Film Not in the English Language	Godzilla Minus One	Nominated	
2024	3rd Portland Critics Association Awards	Best Film Not in the English Language	Godzilla Minus One	Nominated	
2024	3rd Portland Critics Association Awards	Best Science Fiction Feature	Godzilla Minus One	Won	
2024	3rd Portland Critics Association Awards	Best Visual Effects	Godzilla Minus One	Nominated	
2024	3rd Portland Critics Association Awards	Best Stunts or Action Choreography	Godzilla Minus One	Nominated	
2024	28th San Diego Film Critics Society Awards	Best Foreign Language Film	Godzilla Minus One	Runner-up	
2024	28th San Diego Film Critics Society Awards	Best Visual Effects	Godzilla Minus One	Won	
2024	28th San Diego Film Critics Society Awards	Best Sound Design	Godzilla Minus One	Nominated	
2024	8th Seattle Film Critics Society Awards	Best International Film	Godzilla Minus One	Won	
2024	8th Seattle Film Critics Society Awards	Best Visual Effects	Godzilla Minus One	Won	
2024	8th Seattle Film Critics Society Awards	Best Action Choreography	Godzilla Minus One	Nominated	
2024	22nd Utah Film Critics Association Awards	Best Non-English Feature	Godzilla Minus One	Runner-up	
2024	22nd Utah Film Critics Association Awards	Best Visual Effects	Godzilla Minus One	Won	
2024	22nd Visual Effects Society Awards	Outstanding Animated Character in a Photoreal Feature	Godzilla Minus One	Nominated	
