= 29th Japan Academy Film Prize =

Japanese film awards in 2006

- Date: March 3, 2006
- Site: Grand Prince Hotel New Takanawa, Tokyo, Japan
- Hosted by: Hiroshi Sekiguchi; Kyōka Suzuki

Highlights
- Most awards: Always Sanchōme no Yūhi (12) (+1: New actor of the year)
- Most nominations: Always Sanchōme no Yūhi (13)

The 29th Japan Academy Film Prize (第29回日本アカデミー賞) is the 29th edition of the Japan Academy Film Prize, an award presented by the Nippon Academy-Sho Association to award excellence in filmmaking. It awarded the best films of 2005 and it took place on March 3, 2006 at the Grand Prince Hotel New Takanawa in Tokyo, Japan.

== Nominees ==
=== Awards ===
Picture of the Year	Director of the Year
Always Sanchōme no Yūhi; Year One in the North; The Samurai I Loved; Break Through!; Bōkoku no Aegis	Takashi Yamazaki – Always Sanchōme no Yūhi; Kazuyuki Izutsu – Break Through!; Mitsuo Kurotsuchi – The Samurai I Loved; Junji Sakamoto – Bōkoku no Aegis; Isao Yukisada – Year One in the North
Screenplay of the Year	Popularity Award
Takashi Yamazaki and Ryōta Kosawa – Always Sanchōme no Yūhi; Mitsuo Kurotsuchi – The Samurai I Loved; Machiko Nasu – Year One in the North; Yasuo Hasegawa and Kenzaburō Īda – Bōkoku no Aegis; Daisuke Habara and Kazuyuki Izutsu – Break Through!	Nana (Production Category); Erika Sawajiri – Break Through! (Actor Category)
Outstanding Performance by an Actor in a Leading Role	Outstanding Performance by an Actress in a Leading Role
Hidetaka Yoshioka – Always Sanchōme no Yūhi; Somegorō Ichikawa – The Samurai I Loved; Hiroyuki Sanada – Bōkoku no Aegis; Satoshi Tsumabuki – Spring Snow; Yūsuke Santamaria – Negotiator: Mashita Masayoshi	Sayuri Yoshinaga – Year One in the North; Yoshino Kimura – The Samurai I Loved; Koyuki – Always Sanchōme no Yūhi; Yūko Takeuchi – Spring Snow; Mika Nakashima – Nana
Outstanding Performance by an Actor in a Supporting Role	Outstanding Performance by an Actress in a Supporting Role
Shinichi Tsutsumi – Always Sanchōme no Yūhi; Teruyuki Kagawa – Year One in the North; Susumu Terajima – Negotiator: Mashita Masayoshi; Etsushi Toyokawa – Year One in the North; Kiichi Nakai – Bōkoku no Aegis	Hiroko Yakushimaru – Always Sanchōme no Yūhi; Yuriko Ishida – Year One in the North; Satomi Ishihara – Year One in the North; Michiyo Okusu – Spring Snow; Shinobu Terajima – Tokyo Tower
Outstanding Achievement in Music	Outstanding Achievement in Cinematography
Naoki Satō – Always Sanchōme no Yūhi; Taro Iwashiro – The Samurai I Loved; Taro Iwashiro – Spring Snow; Michiru Ōshima – Year One in the North; Trevor Jones – Bōkoku no Aegis	Kōzō Shibasaki – Always Sanchōme no Yūhi; Norimichi Kasamatsu – Bōkoku no Aegis; Nobuyasu Kita – Year One in the North; Shinji Kugimiya – The Samurai I Loved; Mark Lee Ping Bin – Spring Snow
Outstanding Achievement in Lighting Direction	Outstanding Achievement in Art Direction
Kenichi Mizuno – Always Sanchōme no Yūhi; Kenji Ishida – Bōkoku no Aegis; Yūki Nakamura – Year One in the North; Sōsuke Yoshikado – The Samurai I Loved; Yūki Nakamura – Spring Snow	Anri Joujou – Always Sanchōme no Yūhi; Akira Sakuragi – The Samurai I Loved; Mitsuo Harada – Bōkoku no Aegis; Kyōko Heya – Year One in the North; Shū Yamaguchi – Spring Snow
Outstanding Achievement in Sound Recording	Outstanding Achievement in Film Editing
Hitoshi Tsurumaki – Always Sanchōme no Yūhi; Hironori Itō – Year One in the North; Hironori Itō – Spring Snow; Fumio Hashimoto – Bōkoku no Aegis; Yasuo Hashimoto – The Samurai I Loved	Ryūji Miyajima – Always Sanchōme no Yūhi; Tsuyoshi Imai – Year One in the North; Tsuyoshi Imai – Spring Snow; William M. Anderson – Bōkoku no Aegis; Hiroshi Okuda – The Samurai I Loved
Outstanding Foreign Language Film	Newcomer of the Year
Million Dollar Baby; The Phantom of the Opera; Cinderella Man; Star Wars: Episode III – Revenge of the Sith; Charlie and the Chocolate Factory	Ryo Katsuji – Bōkoku no Aegis; Ryunosuke Kamiki – The Great Yokai War; Shun Shioya – Break Through!; Erika Sawajiri – Break Through!; Mika Nakashima – Nana; Maki Horikita – Always Sanchōme no Yūhi
Special Award from the Association	Special Award of Honour from the Association
Tsuburaya Productions; Toei Company; Noboru Nishio (Optical Recording); Lee Bong-Ou (Producer)	Mitsuko Mori (Actress)
Special Award from the Chairman	
Teruo Ishii (Director); Kihachi Okamoto (Director); Kuratarō Takamura (Cinematographer); Yoshitarō Nomura (Director); Tatsuo Matsumura (Actor)	
