= Nikkan Sports Film Award for Yūjirō Ishihara Award =

Annual Japanese film award

- Awarded for: Yūjirō Ishihara Award
- Country: Japan
- Presented by: Nikkan Sports
- First award: 1988
- Website: www.nikkansports.com/entertainment/award/ns-cinema/top-ns-cinema.html

The Nikkan Sports Film Award for Yūjirō Ishihara Award is an award given at the Nikkan Sports Film Award.

== List of winners ==
No.	Year	Film	Director
1	1988	The Silk Road	Junya Satō
2	1989	Rikyu	Hiroshi Teshigahara
3	1990	Aurora no Shita de	Toshio Gotō
4	1991	Rainbow Kids	Kihachi Okamoto
5	1992	Porco Rosso	Hayao Miyazaki
6	1993	Bloom in the Moonlight	Shinichiro Sawai
7	1994	Hero Interview	Michio Mitsuno
8	1995	Kura	Yasuo Furuhata
9	1996	Gakko II	Yoji Yamada
10	1997	Princess Mononoke	Hayao Miyazaki
11	1998	Hana-bi	Takeshi Kitano
12	1999	Owls' Castle	Masahiro Shinoda
13	2000	Whiteout	Setsurō Wakamatsu
14	2001	Hotaru	Yasuo Furuhata
15	2002	Hi wa Mata Noboru	Kiyoshi Sasabe
16	2003	Bayside Shakedown 2	Katsuyuki Motohiro
17	2004	Half a Confession	Kiyoshi Sasabe
18	2005	Always Sanchōme no Yūhi	Takashi Yamazaki
19	2006	Yamato	Junya Sato
20	2007	Love and Honor	Yoji Yamada
21	2008	Climber's High	Masato Harada
22	2009	Mt. Tsurugidake	Daisaku Kimura
23	2010	Umizaru 3: The Last Message	Eiichirō Hasumi
24	2011	Detective in the Bar	Hajime Hashimoto
25	2012	Anata e	Yasuo Furuhata
26	2013	A Boy Called H	Yasuo Furuhata
27	2014	Rurouni Kenshin	Keishi Ōtomo
28	2015	The Emperor in August	Masato Harada
29	2016	Dangerous Cops: Final 5 Days	Toru Murakawa
30	2017	Outrage Coda	Takeshi Kitano
31	2018	One Cut of the Dead	Shinichirō Ueda
32	2019	The Great War of Archimedes	Takashi Yamazaki
33	2020	Demon Slayer: Kimetsu no Yaiba the Movie: Mugen Train	Haruo Sotozaki
34	2021	Baragaki: Unbroken Samurai	Masato Harada
35	2022	Kingdom 2: Far and Away	Shinsuke Sato
36	2023	The First Slam Dunk	Takehiko Inoue
37	2024	Last Mile	Ayuko Tsukahara
38	2025	Hero's Island	Keishi Ōtomo
