= Hidetaka Yoshioka =

Japanese actor (born 1970)

- 吉岡 秀隆
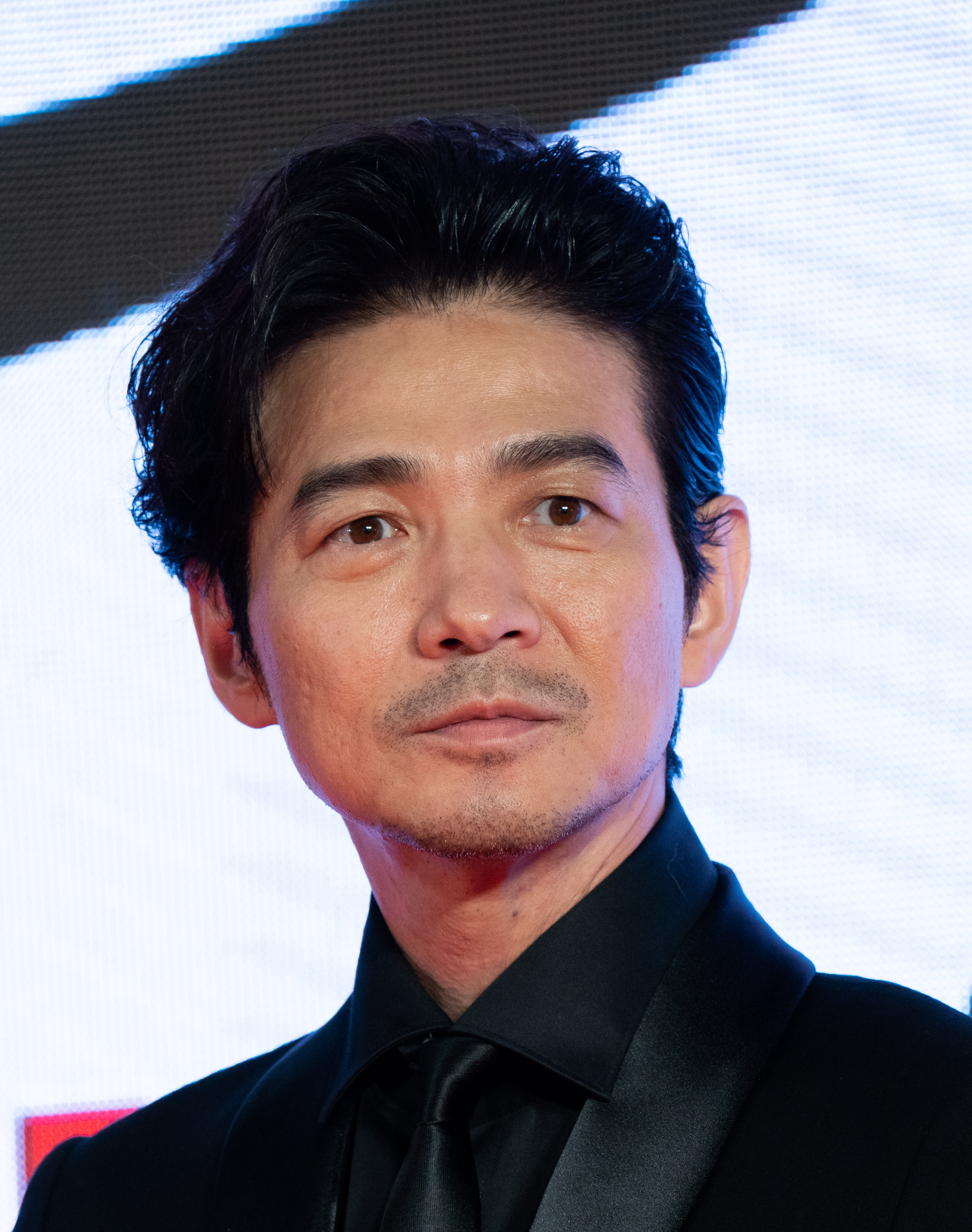
- Yoshioka at Tokyo International Film Festival in 2019
- Born: August 12, 1970 (age 56); Warabi, Japan
- Occupation: Actor
- Years active: 1975–present
- Spouse: Yuki Uchida (m. 2002; div. 2005)

Hidetaka Yoshioka (吉岡 秀隆; born on August 12, 1970) is a Japanese actor known for his performance in several movies as a child and the TV drama Dr. Coto's Clinic. He played the part of Tora-san's nephew in the Otoko wa Tsurai yo film series, and he appeared in Akira Kurosawa's Rhapsody in August and Madadayo. He won two Japan Academy Awards Best Actor for Always: Sunset on Third Street and its sequel Always: Sunset on Third Street 2.

== Career ==
Yoshioka made his debut around the age of five in the television drama Ōedo Sōsamō (1970–1992). He became one of the most popular child actors in Japan during the 1980s. He appeared in both film and television, including long-running series such as Otoko wa Tsurai yo (1969–1997) and Kita no Kuni kara (1981–2002). His growth is documented in these works.

In 1997, following the death of Kiyoshi Atsumi, the Otoko wa Tsurai yo series came to an end, and Kita no Kuni kara, another long-running series, also came to a close in 2002. However, Yoshioka quickly found a new career-defining role in the hit drama Dr. Coto's Clinic (2003–2006).

In 2006, he won the Japan Academy Prize for Outstanding Performance by an Actor in a Leading Role for his performance in Always: Sunset on Third Street, directed by Takashi Yamazaki. Yamazaki has also cast him in entries of the Godzilla series.

== Personal life ==
In 2002, Yoshioka married actress Yuki Uchida, but the couple divorced in 2005.

== Filmography ==
=== Film ===
- A Distant Cry from Spring (1980)
- Otoko wa Tsurai yo (1981–2019), Mitsuo Suwa
- Final Take (1986), Mitsuo
- Oracion (1988), Makoto Tano
- Rhapsody in August (1991), Tateo
- Madadayo (1993), Takayama's son
- Poppoya (1999), Hideo Sugiura
- Juvenile (2000), Yūsuke Sakamoto
- The Hidden Blade (2004), Samon Shimada
- Miracle in Four Days (2005), Keisuke Kisaragi
- Always: Sunset on Third Street (2005), Ryunosuke Chagawa
- The Professor's Beloved Equation (2006), Root (adult)
- Always: Sunset on Third Street 2 (2007), Ryūnosuke Chagawa
- Always: Sunset on Third Street '64 (2012)
- The Sea Is Watching (2012)
- The Little House (2014)
- 64: Part I (2016), Kazuki Kōda
- 64: Part II (2016), Kazuki Kōda
- Fueled: The Man They Called Pirate (2016), Tadashi Shinonome
- Reminiscence (2017)
- Kodomo Shokudō (2018)
- Fukushima 50 (2020), Takumi Maeda
- The Brightest Roof in the Universe (2020)
- In the Wake (2021)
- The Bonds of Clay (2021)
- The Pass: Last Days of the Samurai (2022), Takatoshi Iwamura
- Riverside Mukolitta (2022)
- Dr. Coto's Clinic 2022 (2022), Dr. Kensuke Gotō
- Winny (2023), Toshirō Senba
- Godzilla Minus One (2023), Kenji Noda
- Snowflowers: Seeds of Hope (2025), Ōtake Ryōgen
- 5 Centimeters per Second (2025), Ogawa
- Godzilla Minus Zero (2026), Kenji Noda

=== Television ===
- Kita no Kuni kara (1981 – 2002), Jun Kuroita
- Dr. Coto's Clinic (2003 – 2006), Dr. Kensuke Gotō
- The Policeman's Lineage (2009), Tamio Anjō
- All About My Siblings (2014), Dr. Masaomi Shinjo
- Akuma ga Kitarite Fue wo Fuku (2018), Kosuke Kindaichi
- Yell (2020), Dr. Takeshi Nagata
- Queen of Mars (2025), Riki Kawanabe
- Brothers in Arms (2026), Sen no Rikyū

=== Anime ===
- The Place Promised in Our Early Days (2004), Hiroki Fujisawa
- Osamu Tezuka's Buddha (2011), Gautama Buddha

== Endorsements ==
- Nippon Telegraph and Telephone (1996)
- Suntory (1996–2007)
- Sharp Corporation (2004)
- Sundrug (2008)
- Yamasa (2007–2010)

== Awards and nominations ==
Year	Award	Category	Nominated work	Result	Ref.
2005	28th Japan Academy Film Prize	Best Supporting Actor	The Hidden Blade	Nominated	
2006	29th Japan Academy Film Prize	Best Actor	Always: Sunset on Third Street	Won	
2008	31st Japan Academy Film Prize	Best Actor	Always: Sunset on Third Street 2	Won	

== External links and sources ==
- (in Japanese) Official site
- Profile on Hogacentral
- Hidetaka Yoshioka at IMDb
