= Kenta Suga =

Japanese actor (born 1994)

- 須賀 健太
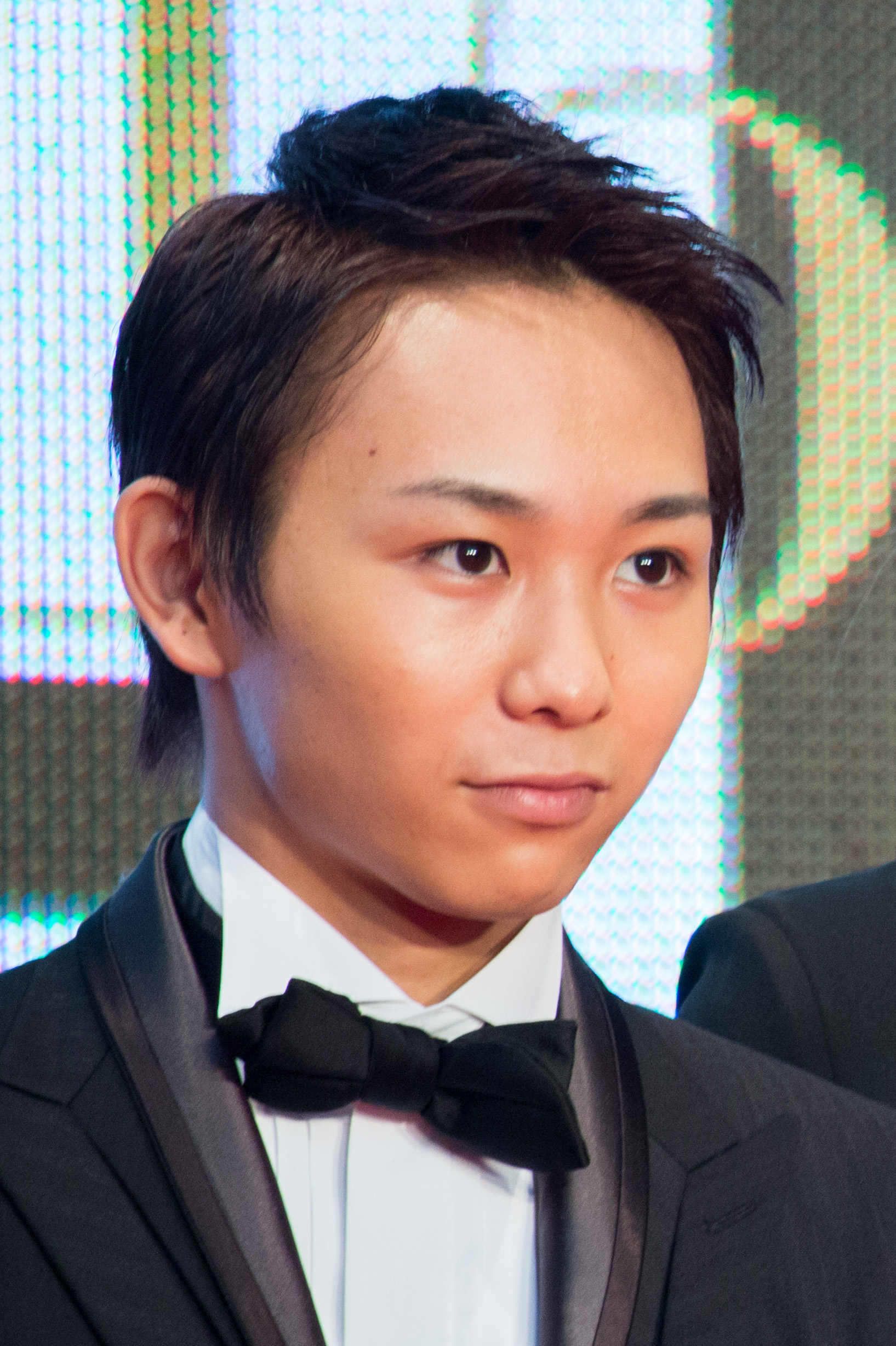
- Kenta Suga at the 28th Tokyo International Film Festival in 2015.
- Born: October 19, 1994 (age 31); Edogawa, Tokyo, Japan
- Occupation: Actor
- Years active: 1998 - Present
- Agents: Central Group; Horipro
- Height: 1.66 m (5 ft 5 in)

Kenta Suga (須賀 健太, Suga Kenta; born October 19, 1994, in Edogawa, Tokyo, Japan) is a Japanese actor who is represented by the talent agency, Central Group, then Horipro.

== Filmography ==
=== TV series ===
Year	Title	Role	Network	Notes	Ref.
2002	Be Nice to People	Akira Igarashi	Fuji TV		
2022	Accomplishment of Fudanshi Bartender	Yuto Chita	Fuji TV		
2022	New Nobunaga Chronicle: High School Is a Battlefield	Kiyomasa Kato	NTV		
2022	Love You as the World Ends	Shinji	Hulu	Season 3	

=== Films ===
Year	Title	Role	Notes	Ref.
2005	Always: Sunset on Third Street	Junnosuke Furuyuki		
2006	Boy Meets Ghost	Ichiro Hanada	Lead role	
2007	Always: Sunset on Third Street 2	Junnosuke Furuyuki		
2012	Always: Sunset on Third Street 3	Junnosuke Furuyuki		
2014	Sweet Poolside	Toshihiko Ota	Lead role	
2017	Love and Other Cults	Ryōta	Lead role	
2021	Shrieking in the Rain	Shinji		
2024	Love You as the World Ends: The Final	Shinji		
