= Robot Communications =

Japanese animation and visual effects studio

Robot Communications Inc.
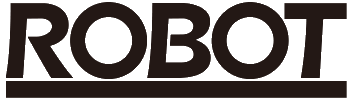

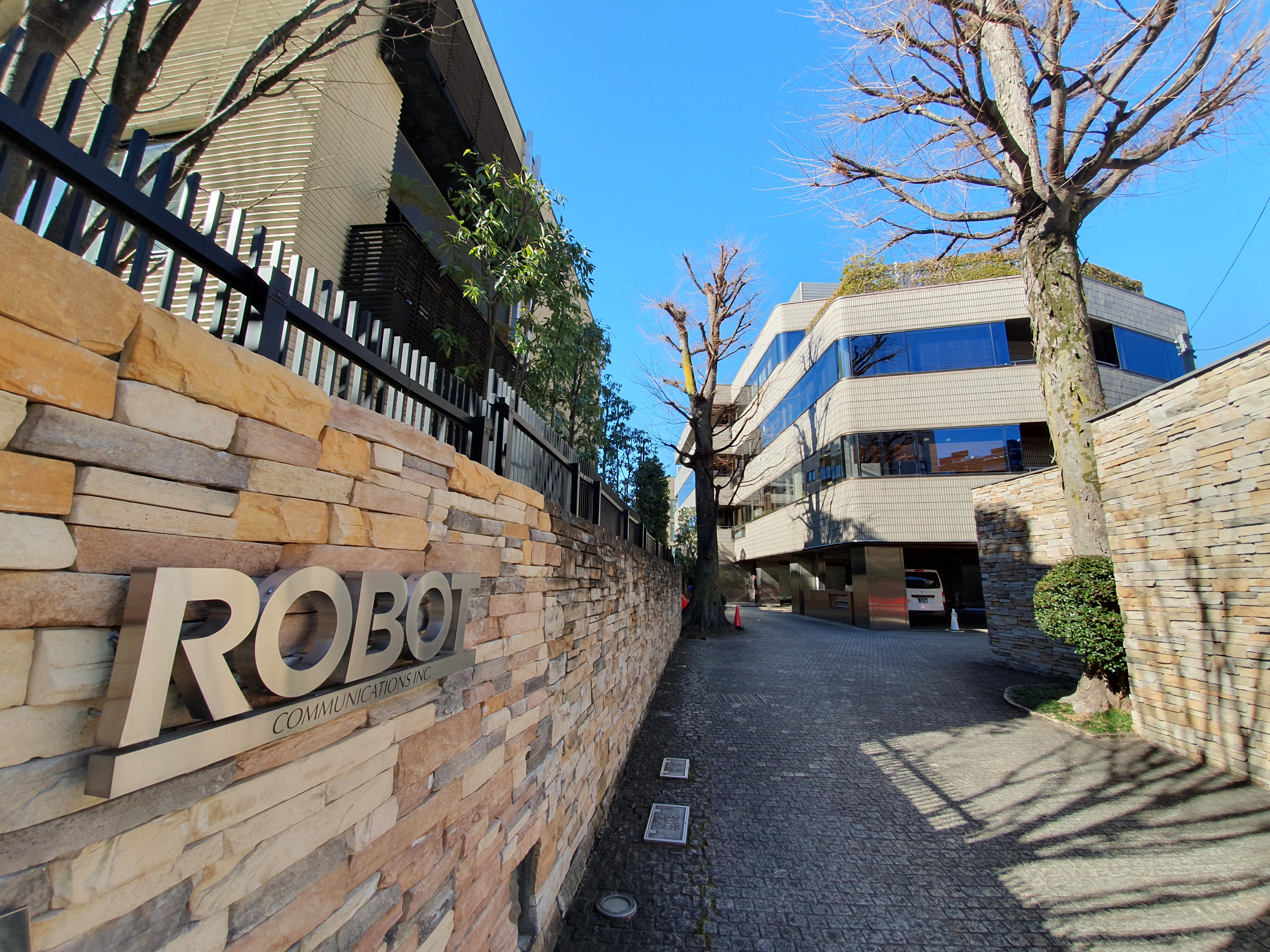
- Animation studio
- Native name: 株式会社ロボット
- Romanized name: Kabushikigaisha Robotto
- Founded: June 3, 1986
- Founder: Shūji Abe
- Headquarters: Ebisunami, Shibuya, Tokyo, Japan
- Products: Television series, films, visual effect, animation
- Parent: Imagica Group
- Website: www.robot.co.jp

Robot Communications Inc. (株式会社ロボット, Kabushikigaisha Robotto) is a Japanese production company founded on June 3, 1986, by Shūji Abe, and based in Tokyo. It won the 2008 Academy Award for Best Animated Short Film for La Maison en Petits Cubes.

== Productions ==
- July 7th, Sunny Day (1996)
- Parasite Eve (1997)
- Juvenile (2000)
- Satorare (2001)
- Onimusha 2: Samurai's Destiny (2002)
- Returner (2002)
- Bayside Shakedown 2 (2003)
- Zoo Keeper (2003; browser game)
- Onimusha 3: Demon Siege (2004)
- Umizaru (2004)
- Fantastipo (2005)
- Always: Sunset on Third Street (2005)
- Midnight Sun (2006)
- Always: Sunset on Third Street 2 (2007)
- K-20: Legend of the Mask (2008)
- Space Battleship Yamato (2010)
- Wild 7 (2011)
- Always: Sunset on Third Street '64 (2011)
- The Eternal Zero (2013)
- Stand by Me Doraemon (2014; with Shin-Ei Animation)
- Little Forest: Summer/Autumn (2014)
- Parasyte: Part 1 (2014)
- Little Forest: Winter/Spring (2015)
- Assassination Classroom (2015)
- Parasyte: Part 2 (2015)
- Chihayafuru Part 1 (2016)
- Chihayafuru Part 2 (2016)
- A Man Called Pirate (2016)
- Terra Formars (2016)
- March Comes in Like a Lion (2017)
- Chihayafuru Part 3 (2018)
- Dragon Quest: Your Story (2019)
- Alice in Borderland (2020)
- Stand by Me Doraemon 2 (2020; with Shin-Ei Animation)
- Motokare Retry (2022)
- Godzilla Minus One (2023; with Toho Studios)
- YuYu Hakusho (2023)
- Chastity High (2024)
- Glass Heart (2025)
- Soul Mate (2026; with Gtist)
- Godzilla Minus Zero (2026; with Toho Studios)
- Kidnap Game (2026; with MakerVille Pictures, SIMSTORY, Viu, Fuji Television)
- Side By Side (2027; with Fuji Television)
