= A Man Called Pirate =

Japanese historical novel by Naoki Hyakuta

A Man Called Pirate (Japanese: 海賊とよばれた男, Hepburn: Kaizoku to yobareta otoko) is a best selling Japanese historical novel by Naoki Hyakuta. As of January 2014, it had sold over 1,700,000 copies. It is loosely based on the story of Sazō Idemitsu, the founder of Idemitsu Kosan, a Japanese oil company. The book has patriotic themes that would more commonly be associated with the Japanese right wing but has been popular with the mass market.

== Synopsis ==
The story begins on August 15, 1945, the day Japan loses World War II. Set in 1945–47, the protagonist, Tetsuzo Kunioka, is an owner of a company that sells oil. Most of his company is either missing, in the army, or otherwise not available. The fate of the company's network of overseas offices is also unknown. Not fazed by the defeat of Japan, he is determined that Japan will rise again, and is driven to create a large oil company.

== Media ==
=== Audio drama ===
In 2014, A Man Called Pirate was adapted into an audio drama. Online distribution began on January 1 through the audiobook distribution company FeBe. It was narrated by Masahiko Ueyanagi, an announcer for Nippon Broadcasting System.

=== Manga ===
In 2014, it was adapted into a ten-volume manga series by Souichi Sumoto that was serialized in Evening and published by Kodansha.

=== Film ===
In 2016, it was adapted into a film directed by Takashi Yamazaki.

== Reception ==
As of January 2014, it had sold over 1,700,000 copies. In April 2013, it won the Japan Booksellers award.
