= The Eternal Zero (film) =

- Theatrical release poster
- Directed by: Takashi Yamazaki
- Screenplay by: Takashi Yamazaki; Tamio Hayashi
- Based on: The Eternal Zero by Naoki Hyakuta
- Produced by: Taichi Ueda; Shūji Abe; Chikahiro Ando
- Starring: Junichi Okada; Haruma Miura; Mao Inoue
- Cinematography: Kōzō Shibasaki
- Edited by: Ryūji Miyajima
- Music by: Naoki Satō
- Production company: Robot Communications
- Distributed by: Toho
- Release date: 21 December 2013
- Running time: 144 minutes
- Country: Japan
- Language: Japanese
- Budget: ¥1 billion ($10.25 million)
- Box office: $84.5 million

The Eternal Zero (Japanese: 永遠の0, Hepburn: Eien no Zero) is a 2013 Japanese historical war film directed, co-written, and with visual effects by Takashi Yamazaki. Based on the eponymous 2006 novel by Naoki Hyakuta, the film starts with a frame story set in 2004, where a Japanese man in his twenties learns that he is the grandson of a kamikaze military aviator who died in World War II, and then investigates the life story of his grandfather. The Eternal Zero was released in Japan on 21 December 2013, by Toho. The film grossed over ¥8.76 billion, becoming the highest-grossing Japanese film of 2014.

== Plot ==
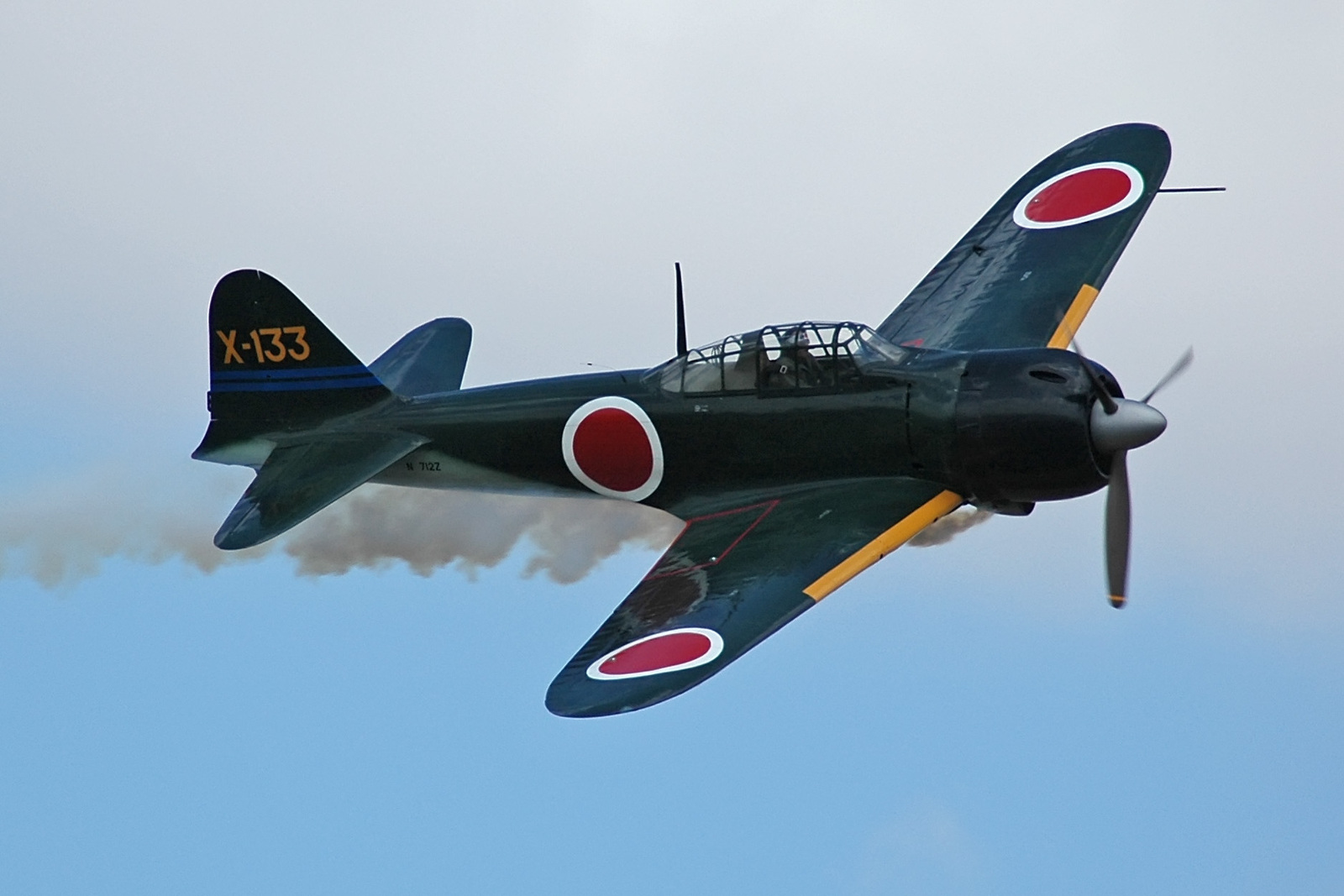
Zero fighter plane

In 2004, twenty-six-year-old Kentaro Saeki is repeatedly failing the national bar examination and is uncertain about his future. One day, after the funeral of his grandmother, Matsuno, he is startled to learn from his mother and older sister Keiko that his maternal grandfather Kenichiro was not his blood-relation. Keiko and Kentaro start hearing stories about their real grandfather, Kyuzo Miyabe and visit many of his former comrades, all of whom begin by criticizing his "timidity" in battle. During conversation with an old comrade of his grandfather, Izaki, who is in the hospital dying of cancer, Kentaro finally learns the reason why Miyabe became a kamikaze pilot. Izaki talks about his relationship with their grandfather to Keiko and Kentaro, claiming that only the "timid" Miyabe gave him the hope to save his own life after he was shot down over the ocean.

The film begins with an unspecified attack near the end of the Pacific War, a Zero fighter plane threatens the United States Pacific Fleet by cutting through its defensive anti-aircraft fire. Kyuzo Miyabe, the pilot of the Zero, is regarded by his comrades as a coward, though an exceptionally skilled fighter pilot, for consistently returning alive from missions, openly explaining "I don't want to die," the result of a promise made to his wife Matsuno and daughter Kiyoko to return from the war alive.

After the attack on Pearl Harbor in 1941, the Imperial Japanese Navy advances steadily, only to be beaten in the battles from Battle of Midway and Bombing on Rabaul onwards. Despite the rising desperation and hopelessness of their situation, all of Miyabe's men say they wish to die gloriously in battle. However, he persuades them, by his simple and honest example, that to survive is worthwhile. Miyabe accepts severe beatings by outraged senior officers several times for voicing these opinions, but refuses to retract them.

Both Keiko and Kentaro still are puzzled as to why their grandfather – eventually – volunteers for a kamikaze attack. Kentaro, now obsessed with finding the answer, spends much time researching the war. At a blind dinner date with several friends, he becomes incensed when one compares the kamikaze pilots to suicide bombers and storms off. He continues talking with Miyabe's most reticent and intimidating comrade-in-arms, now the head of a Yakuza group, and finds the man willing to explain his own story, which begins to explain this puzzle. He and his sister then learn the details and unfolding of the promise between Miyabe and their living grandfather Kenichiro before the final mission. Miyabe is said by his wife to have kept his promise, by ensuring that many worthy lives were not pointlessly lost and by providing his wife and child with Kenichiro, who becomes a loving husband and father.

One summer day in 1945, Kyuzo Miyabe boards a Zero fighter, but then asks Kenichiro if he can "make a selfish request" and change planes with him. Kenichiro's plane develops engine trouble, and he has to return, leaving Miyabe alone to attack an Essex-class aircraft carrier. The film ends with a calm Miyabe about to crash into the ship.

== Cast ==
- Junichi Okada as Kyuzo Miyabe
- Haruma Miura as Kentaro Saeki
- Mao Inoue as Matsuno
- Kazue Fukiishi as Keiko Saeki
- Jun Fubuki as Kiyoko Saeki
- Isao Natsuyagi as Kenichiro Ōishi
- Shōta Sometani as young Kenichiro
- Isao Hashizume as Izaki
- Gaku Hamada as young Izaki
- Min Tanaka as Kageura
- Hirofumi Arai as young Kageura
- Mikijirō Hira as Hasegawa
- Yuya Endo
- Tatsuya Ueda
- Rakuto Tochihara

== Production ==
This film is based on a novel of the same name by Naoki Hyakuta. However, director Yamazaki and scriptwriter Tamio Hayashi had to edit the original story and remove many of the novel's characters and scenes. Yamazaki said that the production team had "really struggled at the script stage, trying to extract the essence of the novel." Hyakuta himself did not express any objections to the final film script.

Regarding casting, Yamazaki said that they had cast actors on "the basis of whether they were right for the role, not their popularity". He also said that the crew wanted "young actors who had something of the atmosphere of that time about them". Specifically, Yamazaki referred to Okada, saying that "He was extremely close to our image of Miyabe". He further elaborated by saying that "In the film the character knows martial arts, so Okada studied hard. He got so much into it that he became a shihan [qualified teacher].". He praised Okada as a guy "who's really thorough when he focuses on one thing."

The film uses computer-generated imagery to replicate the scenes of bombing runs and dogfights, given the limitation of having a small number of Zero fighters being in a flyable condition having survived till the present day.

== Reception ==
As of early January 2014, the film had grossed ¥3.21 billion (US$30.8 million) at the Japanese box office. By January 19, it had grossed ¥5.17 billion (US$49.45 million). By the end of January, it had grossed ¥5.89 billion (US$57.3 million). The film had grossed ¥6.5 billion (US$64.1 million) about a month and a half after being released. It matched the last record for a Japanese live action film with seven successive weeks at number one with Hero (2007). With more than seven weeks in cinemas, it had grossed ¥6.98 billion. The film earned ¥8.76 billion at the Japanese box office, becoming the 2nd highest-grossing Japanese film of 2013 in the country and the 3rd highest-grossing film of the year in the country.

The Eternal Zero won the Golden Mulberry, the top audience award, at the 16th Udine Far East Film Festival in Italy.

== Accolades ==
The film received 8 prizes at the 38th Japan Academy Awards:

- Best Film
- Best Director
- Best Actor (Okada Junichi)
- Best Cinematography (Shibasaki Kozo)
- Best Lighting Direction (Nariyuki Ueda)
- Best Art Direction (Asato Kamijo)
- Best Sound Recording (Fujimoto Kenichi
- Best Film Editing (Ryuji Miyajima)

== Controversy ==
The Eternal Zero has come under criticism for its nationalistic and sympathetic depiction of the Kamikaze pilots. Director Hayao Miyazaki in an interview accused the film of "trying to make a Zero fighter story based on a fictional war account that is a pack of lies". He added that this film was "just continuing a phony myth" and that he had "hated that sort of thing ever since [I] was a kid." Kazuyuki Izutsu, the director of the 2005 film Break Through! said that the film had "no basis in fact". The film has also courted controversy amongst Japan's neighbors, especially China, with one Chinese commentator reportedly accusing the film of being "propaganda for terrorism".

However, the film's director, Takashi Yamazaki, rejected these interpretations of the film, saying, "The film depicts the war as a complete tragedy, so how can you say it glorifies war?... I really don't get it." He eventually dismissed such criticism, saying that "In the end, people see what they want to see. If you think from the start that 'this movie glorifies war' you're going to see it as a movie that glorifies war, no matter what." Similarly, the author of the original book, Naoki Hyakuta, disagreed with this line of criticism, stating in a tweet that "In my book Eternal Zero, I opposed suicide attacks with determination", "I have never ever viewed wars in a positive light", and the theme of the book was "not to allow our memories of war to fade away". The author also added in a tweet, "I feel sorry for Eternal Zero. [...] On one side of the political spectrum, Japanese right-wing nationalists claimed the book was plagiarized and were indignant about its criticism of high-ranking Japanese government officials, while on the opposite side, left-wingers criticized it as a glorification of war, Hayao Miyazaki rebukes it for fabrication [...]. It is drawing fire literally from all directions."

Yet the book and the film have been warmly received by its Japanese audiences: the film was one of the highest-grossing films of the year in Japan. Notably, Shinzo Abe, the Prime Minister of Japan at the time of the film's release, declared his support for this film and the book, saying that he had been "moved" by it. Yoko Ono also dedicated a special message to the brochure of the film, expressing her concurrence to the message of the film.

== Other media ==
The film was issued on DVD and BD in Japan on 23 July 2014.

== Model Kits ==
Following the release of the film, Hasegawa Models released tie-in 1:72 and 1:48 scale models of the A6M2 and A6M5 Zeros featured in the film.

== See also ==
- Imperial Japanese Navy Air Service
- The Wind Rises, a 2013 film by Miyazaki that documents the life of the Zero engineer, Jiro Horikoshi
