= Ryūji Miyajima =

Japanese film editor (born 1967)

- 宮島 竜治
- Born: July 13, 1967 (age 59); Yokohama, Kanagawa, Japan
- Occupation: Film editor
- Years active: 1996–present
- Awards: 6 Japanese Academy Awards

Ryūji Miyajima (宮島 竜治, Miyajima Ryūji; born July 13, 1967) is a Japanese film editor who has received six Japanese Academy Awards, three for films directed by Takashi Yamazaki.

== Life and career ==
Mutajima was born on July 13, 1967, in Yokohama, Kanagawa, Japan. He began his long career in the Japanese film industry as a film editor on Shunichi Nagasaki's Romance (1996), followed by Masato Hara's 20th Century Nostalgia (1997), and Katsuo Naruse's Immoral Affairs (1997). Thereafter, he worked on a wide range of obscure films from various directors and studios, including Akiyoshi Imazeki's Seventeen and Yuji Nakae's Hotel Hibiscus (both 2002), as well as Shinobu Yaguchi's Swing Girls (2004), and Nobuhiro Yamashita's Linda Linda Linda (2005). He began working with filmmaker Takashi Yamazaki on his breakthrough film Always: Sunset on Third Street (2005), as well as its sequel Always: Sunset on Third Street 2 (2007), before working with Yamazaki's future wife Shimako Satō on her film K-20: Legend of the Mask (2008). Miyajima then went on to collaborate with Yamazaki on almost all of his films thereafter, including Ballad (2009), Space Battleship Yamato (2010), The Eternal Zero (2013), The Great War of Archimedes (2019), and Godzilla Minus One (2023).

== Filmography ==
=== Editor ===
- Romance (1996)
- 20th Century Nostalgia (1997)
- Immoral Affairs (1997)
- The Revenge: A Visit from Fate (1997, supervising editor)
- The Revenge: A Scar That Never Disappears (1997, supervising editor)
- Tomie (1998)
- Nabbie's Love (1999)
- Tomie: Replay (2000)
- Eri ni kubittake (2000)
- Ashita wa kitto (2001)
- Waterboys (2001)
- Misuzu (2001)
- Tomie: Re-birth (2001)
- Tomie: Forbidden Fruit (2002)
- Seventeen (2002)
- Hotel Hibiscus (2002)
- Wild Berries (2003)
- Village Photobook (2004)
- Otōsan no backdrop (2004)
- The Golden Cups: One More Time (2004)
- Swing Girls (2004)
- Linda Linda Linda (2005)
- Always: Sunset on Third Street (2005)
- Sway (2006)
- The Matsugane Potshot Affair (2006)
- Vanished (2006)
- The Prince of Tennis (2006)
- Always: Sunset on Third Street 2 (2007)
- A Gentle Breeze in the Village (2007)
- Koishikute (2007)
- Appleseed Ex Machina (2007)
- Happy Flight (2008)
- K-20: Legend of the Mask (2008)
- One Million Yen Girl (2008)
- Resident Evil: Degeneration (2008)
- Shiawase no Kaori (2008)
- Dear Doctor (2009)
- Ballad (2009)
- Halo Legends (2009, segment "The Package")
- Space Battleship Yamato (2010)
- Time Traveller: The Girl Who Leapt Through Time (2010)
- High School Debut (2011)
- Dreams for Sale (2012)
- Robo-G (2012)
- Always: Sunset on Third Street '64 (2012)
- Space Brothers (2012)
- The Eternal Zero (2013)
- Wood Job! (2014)
- Pieta in the Toilet (2015)
- Gamba: Gamba to Nakama-tachi (2015)
- Too Young to Die! (2016)
- Fueled: The Man They Called Pirate (2016)
- The Long Excuse (2016)
- Survival Family (2017)
- Cafe Funiculi Funicula (2018)
- The Great War of Archimedes (2019)
- Dance with Me (2019)
- Under the Open Sky (2020)
- The Zen Diary (2022)
- Cool Doji Danshi (2023, 6 episodes)
- Godzilla Minus One (2023)
- Baka's Identity (2025)
- Call Me by No-Name (2025, 8 episodes)
- Godzilla Minus Zero (2026)
