= Shūji Abe =

Japanese film producer (1949–2023)

- 阿部 秀司
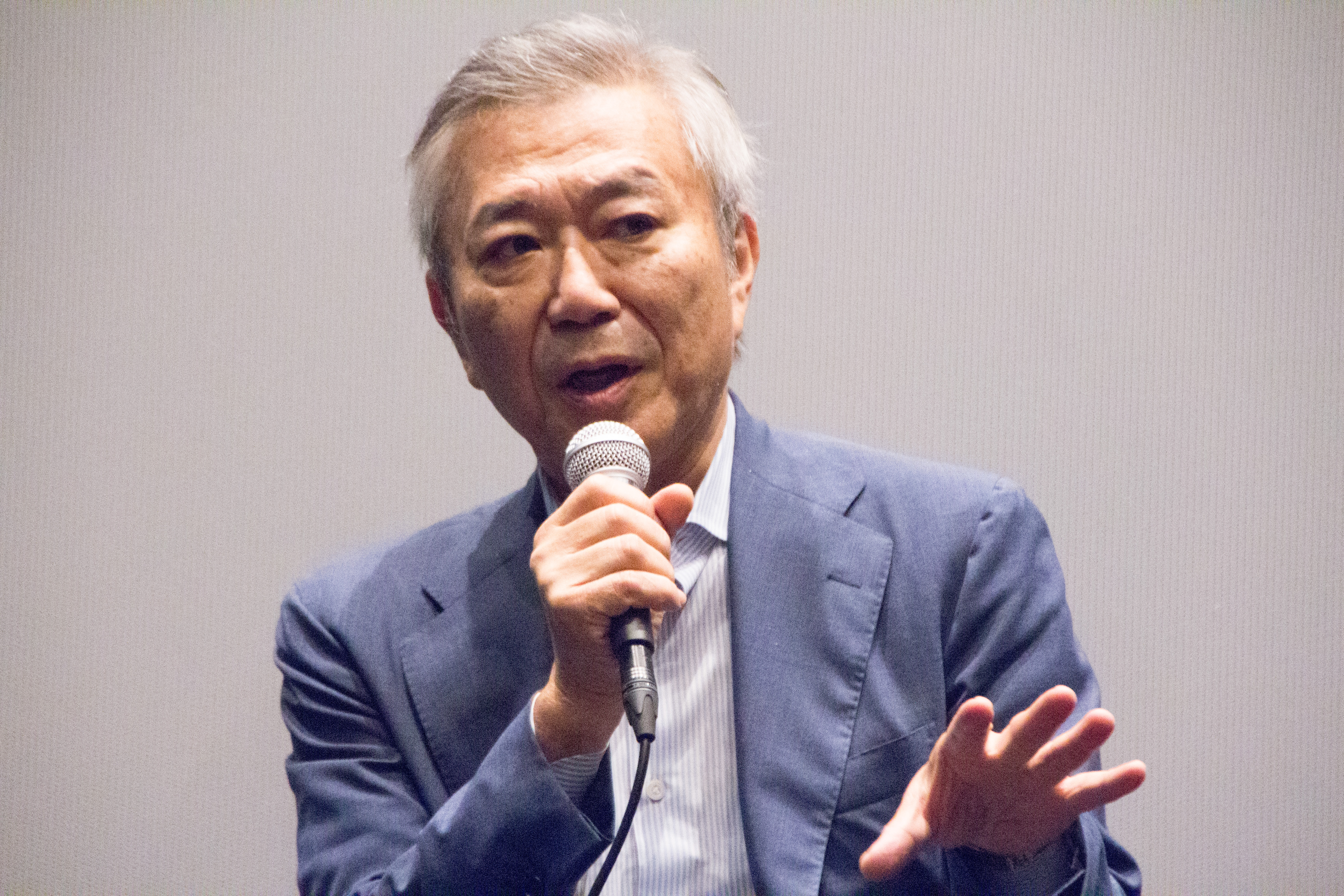
- Abe in 2016
- Born: August 7, 1949; Chiba, Japan
- Died: December 11, 2023 (aged 74)
- Occupation: Film producer
- Years active: 1986–2023
- Title: Founder of Robot Communications; Representative director and president of Shuji Abe Office
- Website: abeshuji.co.jp

Shūji Abe (阿部 秀司, Abe Shūji, August 7, 1949 – December 11, 2023) was a Japanese film producer. The founder of Robot Communications, he was responsible for the production of many of Japan's most successful and acclaimed movies from the 21st century, including Bayside Shakedown 2 (2003), Stand by Me Doraemon (2014), and Godzilla Minus One (2023).

== Life and career ==
Abe was born in Chiba, Japan on August 7, 1949. In June 1986, he founded the Japanese film production studio Robot Communications, starting work on graphics design and television commercials in 1987. Robot became a leading Japanese studio in the 2000s, making some of the biggest titles in Japan and overseas (all of which produced by Abe), including box office record holder Bayside Shakedown 2 (2003), and Takashi Yamazaki's Always: Sunset on Third Street (2005). Comic Book Resources stated that while Abe has produced some of the most successful Japanese pictures of all time, his "impact and business savvy is perhaps best captured in comments about one of his newest productions, Godzilla Minus One". Yamazaki said that Abe was responsible for the "English + Japanese titles" for his films, such as Always: Sunset on Third Street and suggested he may have also converted the title for Minus One.

Abe also produced Love Letter (1995), Juvenile (2000), Returner (2002), Professor Layton and the Eternal Diva (2009), Space Battleship Yamato (2010), The Eternal Zero (2013), Stand by Me Doraemon (2014), Parasyte: Part 1 (2014), Dragon Quest: Your Story (2019), and Lupin III: The First (2019). In 2015, he received the Animation Lifetime Achievement at the 24th Japan Movie Critics Awards for his work on Stand by Me Doraemon.

On December 21, 2023, it was announced that Abe had died on December 11, at the age of 74. A private funeral had already been held by his family. The visual effects team for Godzilla Minus One paid tribute to Abe upon winning Best Visual Effects at the 96th Academy Awards.

== Filmography ==
- Love Letter (1995) – Producer
- Parasite Eve (1997) – Production supervisor
- Space Travelers (2000) – Planning
- Juvenile (2000) – Producer
- Returner (2002) – Producer
- Bayside Shakedown 2 (2003) – Producer
- Umizaru (2004) – Producer
- Always: Sunset on Third Street (2005) – Producer
- Always: Sunset on Third Street 2 (2007) – Producer
- K-20: Legend of the Mask (2008) – Producer
- Professor Layton and the Eternal Diva (2009) – Producer
- Space Battleship Yamato (2010) – Producer
- The Eternal Zero (2013) – Producer
- Stand by Me Doraemon (2014) – Producer
- Parasyte: Part 1 (2014) – Producer
- Parasyte: Part 2 (2015) – Producer
- The Great War of Archimedes (2019) – Producer
- Dragon Quest: Your Story (2019) – Producer
- Lupin III: The First (2019) – Producer
- Ghost Book Obakezukan (2022) – Producer
- Godzilla Minus One (2023) – Producer
- Godzilla Minus One/Minus Color (2024) – Producer
