= K-20: Legend of the Mask =

- Official Japanese film poster
- Directed by: Shimako Satō
- Screenplay by: Shimako Satō
- Based on: Kaijin Nijū Mensō Den and Kaijin Nijū Mensō Den: Seidō no Majin by: Sō Kitamura; characters by Edogawa Ranpo
- Produced by: Shūji Abe; Seiji Okuda
- Starring: Takeshi Kaneshiro; Takako Matsu; Tōru Nakamura
- Cinematography: Kōzō Shibasaki
- Edited by: Ryūji Miyajima
- Music by: Naoki Satō
- Production companies: Nippon TV; Robot Communications
- Distributed by: Toho
- Release date: December 20, 2008
- Running time: 137 minutes
- Country: Japan
- Language: Japanese
- Box office: JP¥21,017,206 (US$21,443,265)

K-20: Legend of the Mask (Japanese: K-20 怪人二十面相・伝, Hepburn: Kē-Tuentī: Kaijin Nijū Mensō Den; literally "Legend of the Twenty-Faced Mysterious Person") is a 2008 Japanese action film written and directed by Shimako Satō and based on a novel by Sō Kitamura and its sequel, and also features characters created by Edogawa Ranpo. The film was released worldwide on December 20, 2008. Takeshi Kaneshiro, Takako Matsu, Tōru Nakamura and Kanata Hongo star in the film, along with Takeshi Kaga, Fumiyo Kohinata, Reiko Takashima, Toru Masuoka and Yuki Imai.

== Plot ==
Set in a reality where Japan avoided World War II by signing a peace treaty with the United States, the film takes place in 1949 in the capital of Teito. There is a wide gap between the rich and the poor, with aristocrats owning 90% of the wealth. The right-wing military–industrial complex have developed a Tesla-style energy beam with the ability to cause Tunguska-style devastation. However, a mysterious masked thief dubbed "K-20" (short for "Kaijin Nijū-Mensō" - the Phantom Thief with 20 faces), steals valuables from the rich and is considered a criminal.

One day, a circus acrobat named Heikichi Endo is assigned a task by a mysterious man with a scar on his face, claiming to work for Kastori Magazine Heikichi, to does the man's bidding to take photographs of duchess Yoko Hashiba and detective Akechi Kogoro's wedding. Endo climbs up the outside of the building which is hosting the wedding, but is arrested after an explosion, leaving him to be arrested and question by Akechi. Later, an inmate gives Heikichi a description of what K-20's alleged face looks like, bringing Heikichi to the realization that the man who claimed to work for Kastori Magazine was really K-20 in disguise and he has been set up to be K-20 by K-20 himself. Sometime later, Heikichi escapes the police vehicle transporting him to another prison and is taken into hospitality by the ringmaster of his circus, Genji, who turns out to be a thief. Heikichi trains to become a thief with the help of Genji and a book about disguises, for revenge on K-20.

Meanwhile, K-20 attempts to kidnap Akechi's fiancé, Yoko, but is stopped in his tracks by Heikichi, K-20 flees after hearing the police heading towards them, using a grappling hook, Akechi escapes with Yoko taking her back Genji's household. After discovering Heikichi wasn't K-20 during Heikichi's alleyway battle, Yoko attempted to convince Akechi that Heikichi isn't really K-20, while Heikichi and Genji attempt to steal a painting from Akechi's house but are unsuccessful. Akechi captures Heikichi and Genji and questions them in his lounge, Yoko tells her fiancé, his assistant, Heikichi, and Genji that the painting belonged to her grandfather who requested her to always keep it in her sight. They discover that the painting may have instructions for an electrical device known as the Tesla device, which can be used to supply power or as a destructive weapon. Genji tells them that the device needed to discover the weapon is at heavily armed police secured facility.

Akechi and Genji (disguised as an associate of his) enter the facility, but after setting off the laser alarm, the real Akechi enters the room telling the police that the man resembling him is none other than K-20 in disguise, removing his mask, Heikichi impersonating K-20, wearing a small mask over his eyes, a black cape, and hat revealed himself. While Heikichi distracts the police, the real Akechi and Genji use the laser-protected mission to scan the painting. Heikichi is shot at several times by the police unsuccessfully and Akechi's assistant detonates explosives killing several armed officers. Yoko saves Heikichi from the police by helicopter, fulfilling her ambition of flying.

Upon returning to Akechi's house with the scanned painting, they discover strange patines on the back of the artwork. Yoko finds that the Rubik's Cube-like object her grandfather gave to her was the key to activating the Tesla device. Akechi then finds a letter on his table from K-20 and is then shot, while his assistant and Yoko stay with him waiting for paramedics to arrive, Heikichi and Genji go to the building where Yoko and Akechi were to get married and find a small metal square on the floor, they place the Cube into the square, unleashing the Tesla device before they were too reactive the weapon. K-20 appears and knocks Genji unconscious before battling Heikichi, who has the key to activate the Tesla device. During their fight, Heikichi strikes K-20 in the face removing his mask, leading Heikichi to discover K-20 is really Akechi. After Heikichi declines Akechi's offer of collaboration, Akechi attempts to activate the Tesla device and use it as a destructive weapon to destroy Teito and recreate it with him in power. However, while Heikichi and Akechi were in combating, Genji removed some of the device's wires, deactivating it. Genji and Heikichi then escape the building, while Akechi is killed in the blast, with Heikichi leaping out the window seconds before the building imploded, he is saved by Yoko once again flying a helicopter, she tells him that the reason for her delay was that Akechi drugged her.

Shortly thereafter, Heikichi becomes the new K-20.

== Cast ==
- Takeshi Kaneshiro as Heikichi Endo
- Takako Matsu as Yoko Hashiba
- Tōru Nakamura as Kogoro Akechi
- Ryôhei Abe
- Kanata Hongô as Yoshio Kobayashi
- Kyusaku Shimada
- Jun Kunimura as Genji
- Takeshi Kaga as mysterious gentleman
- Kanata Hongō
- Jun Kaname
- Yutaka Matsushige
- Fumiyo Kohinata
- Reiko Takashima as Kikuko
- Toru Masuoka as Inspector Namikoshi
- Hideji Otaki
- Hana Kino
- Kazuyoshi Kushida
- Yuki Imai as Shinsuke
- Kisuke Iida

== Music ==
Although a Japanese film, the final credits roll to the sound of "The Shock of the Lightning" by British band Oasis.

== Poster ==
Japan's K-20 film poster

Hong Kong's K-20 film poster
