= Koyuki =

Japanese model and actress (born 1976)

- 小雪
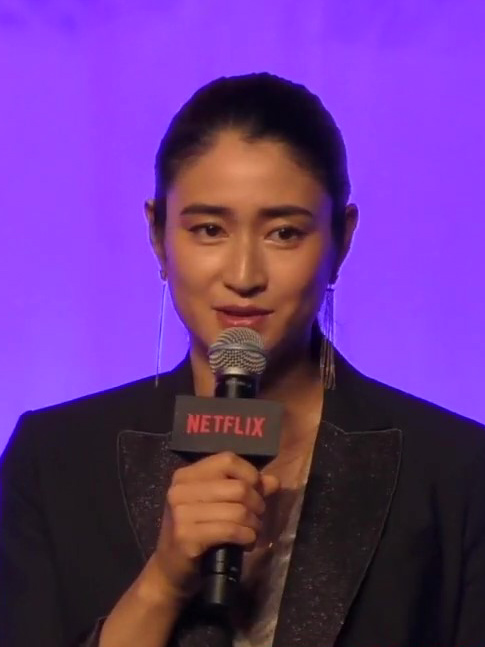
- Koyuki in 2019
- Born: Koyuki Kato (加藤 小雪); December 18, 1976 (age 49); Zama, Kanagawa, Japan
- Education: Tokyo Women's Medical University
- Occupations: Actress, model
- Years active: 1995–present
- Agent(s): Avex Vanguard; FlaMme
- Known for: Kimi wa Petto (2003 drama); The Last Samurai (2003 film); Pulse (2001 film)
- Height: 1.70 m (5 ft 7 in)
- Spouse: Kenichi Matsuyama (m. 2011)
- Children: 3

Koyuki Kato (加藤 小雪, Katō Koyuki; born December 18, 1976), better known by her stage name Koyuki (小雪), is a Japanese model and actress best known for the drama Kimi wa Petto and the film The Last Samurai.

== Career ==
=== Actor career ===
Koyuki appeared in Kiyoshi Kurosawa's 2001 film Pulse.

She rose to fame in the drama Kimi wa Petto (2003) with Jun Matsumoto and gained huge popularity. Her first international film was The Last Samurai (2003) where she played Taka, wife of a Samurai slain by the character Nathan Algren, portrayed by Tom Cruise.

She has appeared in many commercials, including Coca-Cola Japan's Sokenbicha, P&G Max Factor SK-II, and Suntory Kakubin.

== Personal life ==
In 2011, Koyuki married actor Kenichi Matsuyama, who co-starred with her in Kamui Gaiden. The couple's first child was born in January 2012, and their second child was born in January 2013. In July 2015, the couple had their third child.

== Filmography ==
=== Film ===
- Keizoku/eiga (2000) – Nanami Kirishima
- Pulse (2001) – Harue Karasawa
- Laundry (2002) – Mizue
- Alive (2002) – Asuka Saegusa
- Spy Sorge (2003) – Yoshiko Yamazaki
- The Last Samurai (2003) – Taka
- Kwaidan: Eternal Love (2004) – O-Iwa
- Always: Sunset on Third Street (2005) – Hiromi Ishizaki
- Jam Films S (2005)
- GeGeGe no Kitarō (2007) – Tenko
- Always: Sunset on Third Street 2 (2007) – Hiromi Ishizaki
- Blood: The Last Vampire (2009) – Onigen
- Kamui Gaiden (2009) – Sugaru
- It's on Me (2009) – Maya Yamabuki
- Shin-san Tankoumachi no serenâde (2010) – Michiyo
- Detective in the Bar (2011) – Saori
- Always: Sunset on Third Street '64 (2012) – Hiromi Ishizaki
- Persona Non Grata (2015) – Yukiko Sugihara
- A Mother's Touch (2022) – Reiko Fukushima

=== Television ===
- Taburoido (1998)
- Koi wa Aserazu (1998) – Rei Arimura
- Renai Kekkon no Hosoku (1999) – Haruka
- Antique Bakery
- Beautiful Life (2000) – Nakajima Satsuki
- Ikebukuro West Gate Park (2000) – Matsui Kana
- Love Complex (2000) – Kiiko Ninagawa
- Itaria Tsu (2001)
- Tentai Kansoku (2002) – Mifuyu Sawanura
- Tramps Like Us (Also known as Kimi wa Petto) (2003) – Sumire Iwaya
- The Eldest Boy and His Three Elder Sisters (2003) – Sachiko Kashiwakura
- The Way We Live (2004) – Yura Kitajima
- Engine (2005) – Tomomi Mizukoshi
- Sasaki Fusai no Jingi Naki Tatakai (2008) – Sasaki Ritsuko
- Mr. Brain (2009) – Miyase Kumiko
- The Waste Land (2009) – Senri akitsu / Chisato Akitsu
- Legal High (2013) – Ando Kiwa
- The Long Goodbye (2014) – Aiko kamiido
- Fragile (2016) – Madoka Hosoki
- Dai Binbo (2017) – Yazuko Nanakusa
- The Naked Director (2019) – Kayo
- Bones of Steel (2020) – Risa Shibata
- Sanctuary (2023) – Hana
- Boogie Woogie (2023–24) – Tomi Murayama
- Dr. Ashura (2025) – Naomi Rokudou

=== Dubbing ===
- Eragon, Arya (Sienna Guillory)
- Snow White and the Huntsman, Queen Ravenna (Charlize Theron)

== Awards and nominations ==
| Year | Award | Category | Nominated work(s) | Result |
|---|---|---|---|---|
| 2004 | 28th Elan d'or Awards | Newcomer of the Year | Kimi wa Petto | Won |
| 2004 | 7th Nikkan Sports Drama Grand Prix | Best Supporting Actress | The Way We Live and The Eldest Boy and His Three Elder Sisters | Won |
| 2004 | 17th Nikkan Sports Film Awards | Best Actress | Kwaidan: Eternal Love | Won |
| 2006 | 29th Japan Academy Film Prize | Best Actress | Always: Sunset on Third Street | Nominated |
