= Friends: Mononoke Shima no Naki =

- Film poster
- Directed by: Takashi Yamazaki; Ryūichi Yagi
- Written by: Takashi Yamazaki
- Based on: Naita Aka Oni by Hirosuke Hamada
- Produced by: Genki Kawamura
- Starring: Shingo Katori; Koichi Yamadera
- Music by: Naoki Sato; Misia
- Production company: Shirogumi
- Distributed by: Toho
- Release date: 17 December 2011 (Japan)
- Running time: 87 minutes
- Country: Japan
- Language: Japanese

Friends: Mononoke Shima no Naki (Friends: もののけ島のナキ, Friends: Naki of Monster Island) is a 2011 Japanese animated fantasy film that is loosely based on the Japanese children's novel Naita Aka Oni by Hirosuke Hamada. It is directed by Takashi Yamazaki and Ryuichi Yagi. The film's script was also written by Yamazaki. SMAP member Shingo Katori and actor Koichi Yamadera voiced characters in the film.

== Voice cast ==
- Shingo Katori as Naki
- Kōichi Yamadera as Gunjō
- You as Mikke
- Seishiro Kato as Konaki
- Sadao Abe as Gōyan
- Frogman as Samurai

== Production ==
Friends: Mononoke Shima no Naki was first announced on 7 December 2010. It is directed by Takashi Yamazaki, who previously directed the 2010 film Space Battleship Yamato. Shingo Katori, Koichi Yamadera, You, Sadao Abe and Seishiro Kato were announced as the film's voice cast in the same announcement. This film is billed as a "3-D Computer Graphics (3DGC)" anime film. A 2-D version of the film will also be produced and release at the same time as the 3-D version.

The teaser and its official website for this film was launched on 20 August 2011. In the same announcement, its Japan release date was set on 17 December 2011.

=== Theme song ===
The theme song of Friends: Mononoke Shima no Naki is Smile, the theme song of the 1936 film Modern Times. This version of the song is sung by the Japanese singer MISIA.

== Release ==
It was released in Japanese cinemas on 17 December 2011.
