= The Great War of Archimedes =

- Release poster
- Original title: アルキメデスの大戦
- Directed by: Takashi Yamazaki
- Written by: Takashi Yamazaki
- Produced by: Shūji Abe; Kazuaki Kishida
- Starring: Masaki Suda; Tasuku Emoto; Minami Hamabe; Shōfukutei Tsurube II; Jun Kunimura; Isao Hashizume; Min Tanaka; Hiroshi Tachi
- Narrated by: Hitoshi Kubota
- Cinematography: Kōzō Shibasaki
- Edited by: Ryūji Miyajima
- Music by: Naoki Satō
- Production company: Robot Communications
- Distributed by: Toho
- Release date: 26 July 2019 (Japan)
- Running time: 130 minutes
- Country: Japan
- Language: Japanese
- Box office: ¥1.93 billion ($17.7 million)

The Great War of Archimedes (Japanese: アルキメデスの大戦, Hepburn: Arukimedesu no taisen) is a 2019 Japanese historical drama film directed, written and with visual effects by Takashi Yamazaki. Concerning the building of the battleship Yamato, the film is based on a manga by Norifusa Mita. It is a fictionalized telling of the political maneuvers, specifically pertaining to budget and cost issues, that led to the decision to build the Yamato. The film was dubbed into various languages and distributed worldwide.

== Plot ==
Rear Admiral Shigetarō Shimada and Vice Admiral Tadamichi Hirayama of the Imperial Japanese Navy (IJN) propose to build a super-battleship. Admirals Yamamoto and Nagano, who support aircraft carriers, recruit Tadashi Kai to find faults with the proposal. Kai is an autistic mathematics prodigy obsessed with geometry.

Kai uses copied blueprints and extrapolations from the design of the battleship Nagato, and shipbuilding procurement data from personal connections, to show that the new battleship will cost twice the amount estimated by Hirayama, the designer. Hirayama admits to misreporting the cost to get the ship approved, and intended to compensate the shipbuilders by overpaying on future cruisers. Hirayama withdraws the proposal when Kai finds a flaw in the design. The aircraft carrier proposed by Yamamoto's faction is approved instead.

Afterwards, Hirayama tells Kai the real reason for the new battleship. Hirayama believes that Japanese militarism makes war inevitable, and that Japan will destroy itself fighting this unwinnable war. Hirayama intends the battleship to embody Japan's collective spirit to make its loss so traumatizing that Japan will surrender before being invaded. Kai, a pacifist, reluctantly agrees to perfect the battleship design, which becomes the Yamato-class battleship.

Kai attends Yamamoto's inspection of Yamato two months after the attack on Pearl Harbor. Kai — knowing the ship's sacrificial fate — cannot join in the jubilation.

== Cast ==
- Masaki Suda as Lt. Commander / Commander Tadashi Kai
- Hiroshi Tachi as Rear Admiral / Admiral Isoroku Yamamoto
- Tasuku Emoto as Ensign Shōjirō Tanaka
- Minami Hamabe as Kyōko Ozaki
- Min Tanaka as Vice Admiral Tadamichi Hirayama
- Jun Kunimura as Vice Admiral Osami Nagano
- Isao Hashizume as Rear Admiral Shigetarō Shimada
- Eita Okuno as Sub-lieutenant Kunihiko Takato
- Katsuya Kobayashi as Admiral Mineo Ōsumi
- Hajime Yamazaki as Rear Admiral Yoshio Fujioka
- Fumiyo Kohinata as Captain Sekizō Uno
- Shōfukutei Tsurube as Kiyoshi Ōsato
- Kenichi Yajima as Tomekichi Ozaki

== Production ==
In July 2018, Yamazaki announced the production will start and entitled The Great War of Archimedes based on a manga by Norifusa Mita, this picture about the building of the battleship Yamato, and starred Masaki Suda in his first collaboration with Yamazaki. Voice actors for the dubbing into English include Luis Bermudez, Brent Mukai, Lizzy Laurenti, and Dylan Mobley.

== Accolades ==
At the 2020 Japanese Academy Awards, Tasuku Emoto was nominated in the Best Supporting Actor category, and Masaki Suda was nominated in the Best Actor category, for their work in this film.
