= Fueled: The Man They Called Pirate =

- Theatrical release poster
- 海賊とよばれた男
- Directed by: Takashi Yamazaki
- Screenplay by: Takashi Yamazaki
- Based on: A Man Called Pirate by Naoki Hyakuta
- Starring: Junichi Okada; Hidetaka Yoshioka; Shōta Sometani; Ryohei Suzuki; Tōru Nomaguchi; Pierre Taki; Masaomi Kondō; Shinichi Tsutsumi; Haruka Ayase; Jun Kunimura; Kaoru Kobayashi
- Cinematography: Kōzō Shibasaki
- Edited by: Ryūji Miyajima
- Music by: Naoki Satō
- Production companies: Nippon TV; Kodansha; Toho; J Storm; Yomiuri Telecasting Corporation; Dentsu; Robot Communications; Horipro; Shirogumi; D.N. Dream Partners; East Japan Marketing & Communications; Office Abe Shuji; Yomiuri Shimbun; Nikkatsu; Sony Music Entertainment Japan; Sapporo Television Broadcasting; Miyagi Television Broadcasting; Shizuoka Daiichi Television; Chūkyō Television Broadcasting; Hiroshima Telecasting; Yamaguchi Broadcasting; Fukuoka Broadcasting Corporation
- Distributed by: Toho
- Release date: December 10, 2016 (Japan)
- Running time: 145 minutes
- Country: Japan
- Language: Japanese

Fueled: The Man They Called Pirate (Japanese: 海賊とよばれた男, Hepburn: Kaizoku to yobareta otoko) is a 2016 Japanese drama film directed by Takashi Yamazaki. It is based on the 2012 novel of same name (in Japanese) by Naoki Hyakuta. The film was released in Japan on December 10, 2016.

== Cast ==
- Junichi Okada as Tetsuzō Kunioka (based on Sazō Idemitsu)
- Hidetaka Yoshioka as Tadashi Shinonome
- Shōta Sometani as Yoshio Hasebe
- Ryohei Suzuki as Kōtarō Takechi
- Tōru Nomaguchi as Kōichi Kashiwai
- Pierre Taki as Sōhei Fujimoto
- Haru Kuroki as Hatsumi Ogawa
- Ken Mitsuishi as Makio Kunioka
- Haruka Ayase as Yuki Kunioka, Tetsuzō's wife
- Shinichi Tsutsumi as Tatsurō Morita
- Masaomi Kondō (special appearance) as Shōtarō Kida
- Jun Kunimura as Takumi Torikawa
- Kaoru Kobayashi as Jisaku Kōga
- Kenichi Yajima
- Rakuto Tochihara

== Awards ==
Award ceremony	Category	Recipients	Result
40th Japan Academy Prize	Best Actor	Junichi Okada	Nominated
