= Sunset on Third Street =

Japanese manga series

- First tankōbon volume cover

三丁目の夕日 (San-chōme no Yūhi)
- Genre: Slice of life
- Manga
- Written by: Ryōhei Saigan
- Published by: Shogakukan
- Magazine: Big Comic Original
- Original run: September 1974 – present
- Volumes: 72
- Anime television series
- Directed by: Tsuneo Maeda
- Music by: Kentarō Haneda
- Studio: Group TAC
- Original network: JNN (MBS, TBS)
- Original run: October 12, 1990 – September 21, 1991
- Episodes: 27
- Live-action films
- Always: Sunset on Third Street (2005); Always: Sunset on Third Street 2 (2007); Always: Sunset on Third Street '64 (2012)
- icon

Sunset on Third Street (Japanese: 三丁目の夕日・夕焼けの詩, Hepburn: San-chōme no Yūhi Yūyake no Uta; 'Sunset on District Three: Poems of the Sunset') is a Japanese manga series written and illustrated by Ryōhei Saigan. It has been serialized in Shogakukan's seinen manga Big Comic Original since 1974, with its chapters collected in 72 tankōbon volumes as of February 2026.

It was adapted into an anime television series broadcast from 1990 to 1991 and three live-action films: Always: Sunset on Third Street (2005), Always: Sunset on Third Street 2 (2007) and Always: Sunset on Third Street '64 (2012).

It won the 27th Shogakukan Manga Award for general manga in 1982.

== Overview ==
Set in post-war Japan from 1955 to 1964, the series tells countless stories that illustrate the humor and pathos of ordinary Showa life via the residents of the titular "Sunset on Third Street", a fictional Tokyo neighborhood. Though it begins with an exclusive focus on the recently settled Suzuki family and their auto shop, the focus soon expands to include other regulars of the neighborhood, as well as one-shot characters.

Overall, the series is episodic, with stories following selective continuity. Some characters age linearly, while others remain the same age or even grow younger as needed.

== Media ==
=== Manga ===
Written and illustrated by Ryōhei Saigan, Sunset on Third Street has been serialized for over 45 years in Shogakukan's seinen manga magazine Big Comic Original since September 1974. Shogakukan has collected its chapters into individual tankōbon volumes. The first volume was released on September 29, 1975. The tankōbon volumes were initially published under the title Poems of the Sunset (夕焼けの詩, Yūyake no Uta), and several feature stories that were never serialized as part of Sunset on Third Street. The first volume, in particular, collects Professional Lives (プロフェッショナル列伝, Purofesshonaru Retsuden), Saigan's earliest series for Shogakukan, which is markedly different in tone and focus. Starting with the 20th volume, Sunset on Third Street was added to the title of each volume, including re-releases of all prior volumes. As of February 27, 2026, 72 volumes have been released.

==== Volumes ====
No.	Release date	ISBN
1	September 29, 1975	978-4-09-180061-9
2	October 28, 1975	978-4-09-180062-6
3	November 28, 1975	978-4-09-180063-3
4	November 30, 1976	978-4-09-180064-0
5	October 31, 1977	978-4-09-180065-7
6	July 28, 1978	978-4-09-180066-4
7	August 28, 1978	978-4-09-180067-1
8	August 29, 1979	978-4-09-180068-8
9	September 28, 1979	978-4-09-180069-5
10	August 28, 1980	978-4-09-180070-1
11	September 29, 1980	978-4-09-180291-0
12	November 28, 1981	978-4-09-180292-7
13	December 19, 1981	978-4-09-180293-4
14	November 27, 1982	978-4-09-180294-1
15	December 17, 1982	978-4-09-180295-8
16	November 30, 1983	978-4-09-180296-5
17	December 17, 1983	978-4-09-180297-2
18	January 30, 1985	978-4-09-180298-9
19	February 28, 1985	978-4-09-180299-6
20	October 30, 1985	978-4-09-180300-9
21	February 28, 1986	978-4-09-180081-7
22	August 30, 1986	978-4-09-180882-0
23	January 30, 1987	978-4-09-180883-7
24	July 30, 1987	978-4-09-180884-4
25	February 29, 1988	978-4-09-180885-1
26	September 30, 1988	978-4-09-180886-8
27	March 30, 1989	978-4-09-180887-5
28	October 30, 1989	978-4-09-180888-2
29	May 30, 1990	978-4-09-180889-9
30	November 30, 1990	978-4-09-180890-5
31	September 30, 1991	978-4-09-182701-2
32	May 29, 1992	978-4-09-182702-9
33	April 28, 1993	978-4-09-182703-6
34	March 30, 1994	978-4-09-182704-3
35	May 30, 1995	978-4-09-182705-0
36	January 30, 1996	978-4-09-182706-7
37	May 30, 1996	978-4-09-182707-4
38	October 30, 1996	978-4-09-182708-1
39	April 30, 1997	978-4-09-182709-8
40	December 19, 1997	978-4-09-182710-4
41	June 30, 1998	978-4-09-185091-1
42	March 30, 1999	978-4-09-185092-8
43	November 30, 1999	978-4-09-185093-5
44	July 29, 2000	978-4-09-185094-2
45	April 26, 2001	978-4-09-185095-9
46	November 30, 2001	978-4-09-185096-6
47	November 30, 2002	978-4-09-185097-3
48	June 30, 2003	978-4-09-185098-0
49	January 30, 2004	978-4-09-185099-7
50	September 30, 2004	978-4-09-185100-0
51	September 30, 2005	978-4-09-187631-7
52	June 30, 2006	978-4-09-180112-8
53	July 29, 2011	978-4-09-181097-7
54	June 30, 2007	978-4-09-181554-5
55	June 30, 2008	978-4-09-182027-3
56	April 30, 2009	978-4-09-182488-2
57	December 26, 2009	978-4-09-182793-7
58	July 30, 2010	978-4-09-183368-6
59	March 30, 2011	978-4-09-183728-8
60	March 30, 2012	978-4-09-184325-8
61	March 29, 2013	978-4-09-185068-3
62	March 28, 2014	978-4-09-186055-2
63	March 30, 2015	978-4-09-186824-4
64	March 30, 2016	978-4-09-187526-6
65	November 30, 2017	978-4-09-189427-4
66	August 30, 2019	978-4-09-860392-3
67	January 30, 2020	978-4-09-860534-7
68	March 30, 2021	978-4-09-860877-5
69	May 30, 2022	978-4-09-861351-9
70	June 29, 2023	978-4-09-861733-3
71	June 28, 2024	978-4-09-862787-5
72	February 27, 2026	978-4-09-863796-6

=== Anime ===
A twenty-seven episode anime television series adaptation by Group TAC was broadcast on MBS from October 12, 1990, to September 21, 1991.

=== Live-action films ===
The series has been adapted into three live-action films premiered in Japan. Always: Sunset on Third Street, premiered on November 5, 2005; Always: Sunset on Third Street 2, premiered on November 3, 2007; and Always: Sunset on Third Street '64, premiered on January 21, 2012.

== Reception ==
Sunset on Third Street won the 27th Shogakukan Manga Award for general manga in 1982.

The manga has been credited for causing a nostalgia boom.
