= Always: Sunset on Third Street =

- Theatrical poster
- Directed by: Takashi Yamazaki
- Screenplay by: Takashi Yamazaki
- Based on: Sunset on Third Street by Ryōhei Saigan
- Produced by: Shūji Abe; Chikahiro Ando; Keiichiro Moriya; Nozomu Takahashi
- Starring: Hidetaka Yoshioka; Shinichi Tsutsumi; Koyuki; Maki Horikita; Kenta Suga; Kazuki Koshimizu; Tomokazu Miura; Hiroko Yakushimaru
- Cinematography: Kōzō Shibasaki
- Edited by: Ryūji Miyajima
- Music by: Naoki Satō
- Production company: Robot Communications
- Distributed by: Toho
- Release date: 5 November 2005 (Japan)
- Running time: 133 minutes
- Country: Japan
- Language: Japanese

Always: Sunset on Third Street (Japanese: ALWAYS 三丁目の夕日, Hepburn: Ōruweizu: San-chōme no Yūhi) is a 2005 Japanese drama film written and directed by Takashi Yamazaki, based on the manga Sunset on Third Street by Ryōhei Saigan. It was chosen as Picture of the Year at the Japan Academy Film Prize in 2006. The film spawned two sequels, Always: Sunset on Third Street 2 (2007) and Always: Sunset on Third Street '64 (2012).

== Plot ==
In 1958, with the impending completion of Tokyo's TV broadcasting tower as a symbol of Japan's escalating post-war economic recovery, rural schoolgirl Mutsuko (Maki Horikita) arrives from the provinces to begin her first job with Suzuki Auto. Initially impressed by meeting company "president" Norifumi Suzuki (Shinichi Tsutsumi), Mutsuko is shocked to discover her workplace is actually a shabby auto repair shop in Tokyo's down-at-heel Yuhi district.

Suzuki is a bad-tempered employer but Mutsuko is welcomed by his wife, Tomoe (Hiroko Yakushimaru), and their impish 5-year-old son, Ippei (Kazuki Koshimizu). One of Ippei's favorite haunts is a five-and-dime store managed by struggling serial writer Ryunosuke Chagawa (Hidetaka Yoshioka). Regarding now-successful writers like Nobel-prize winner Kenzaburo Oe, as overrated, Chagawa wants to be more than a hack churning out sci-fi yarns and selling cheap toys on the side.

When alluring newcomer Hiromi (Koyuki) opens a sake bar in the area, she gathers clientele quickly—in dramatically compressed manga style—but also finds herself lumbered with Junnosuke (Kenta Suga) the orphaned offspring of the bar's previous tenant. Drunk, and smitten by Hiromi, Chagawa accepts custodianship of the boy.

== Reception ==
The film ranked 15th at the Japanese box office in 2005, and won 12 prizes at the 2006 Japanese Academy Awards, including the awards for Best Film, Director, Actor and Screenplay. It also won the audience award at the 2006 New York Asian Film Festival.

It has been said that the film caused a Shōwa nostalgia boom.

== Cast ==
- Maki Horikita as Mutsuko Hoshino, the apprentice
- Hidetaka Yoshioka as Ryunosuke Chagawa, the writer
- Shinichi Tsutsumi as Norifumi Suzuki, the mechanic
- Koyuki as Hiromi Ishizaki, sake bar owner
- Hiroko Yakushimaru as Tomoe Suzuki, the mechanic's wife
- Kazuki Koshimizu as Ippei Suzuki, the mechanic's son
- Kenta Suga as Junnosuke Furuyuki, the abandoned boy
