= Always: Sunset on Third Street '64 =

- Poster
- Directed by: Takashi Yamazaki
- Screenplay by: Takashi Yamazaki
- Based on: Sunset on Third Street by Ryōhei Saigan
- Starring: Hidetaka Yoshioka; Shinichi Tsutsumi; Koyuki; Maki Horikita; Tomokazu Miura; Hiroko Yakushimaru
- Cinematography: Kōzō Shibasaki
- Edited by: Ryūji Miyajima
- Music by: Naoki Satō
- Production company: Toho
- Distributed by: Toho
- Release date: 21 January 2012 (Japan)
- Running time: 142 minutes
- Country: Japan
- Language: Japanese

Always: Sunset on Third Street '64 (Japanese: ALWAYS 三丁目の夕日'64, Hepburn: Always Sanchōme no Yūhi '64) is a 2012 Japanese drama film written and directed by Takashi Yamazaki, based on the manga Sunset on Third Street by Ryōhei Saigan. It is a sequel to Always: Sunset on Third Street 2 (2007). The film was released on 21 January 2012. Always: Sunset on Third Street '64 is set in Tokyo at the time of the 1964 Tokyo Olympics.

== Cast ==
- Hidetaka Yoshioka
- Koyuki
- Shinichi Tsutsumi
- Hiroko Yakushimaru
- Kenta Suga
- Kazuki Koshimizu
- Maki Horikita
- Mirai Moriyama
- Masako Motai

== Plot ==
Set five years after Always: Sunset on Third Street 2, '64 takes place in the run-up to the 1964 Tokyo Olympics. New buildings rise, the Metropolitan Expressway is built, and land is developed at a furious pace.

Ryunosuke Chagawa, an aspiring novelist in his thirties, has finally married Hiromi, and they live with Junnosuke now a first-year high school student, as a family of three. Chagawa is still serializing his children's story Galactic Boy Minoru in the magazine Adventure Boy Book, but it earns little, and his popularity has been overtaken by a new writer, Midorinuma, leaving the serialization at risk of cancellation. Hiromi, now pregnant, supports the household by running the izakaya Yamafuji, which she opened in part of Chagawa's struggling dagashi (cheap-sweets) shop. Junnosuke studies hard for the University of Tokyo entrance exams in the hope of a stable living, though he has not given up his dream of becoming a novelist.

Across the street, Norifumi Suzuki, president of the Suzuki Auto repair shop, dreams of expanding the business overseas, supported by his wife Tomoe. Their son Ippei, Junnosuke's best friend, is in his rebellious adolescence: he resents the prospect of taking over Suzuki Auto and instead forms a band with his classmates, playing electric guitar in imitation of his idol Yuzo Kayama. Rokko Hoshino, a young woman from Tohoku who lives and works at Suzuki Auto and is loved like a daughter of the family, has become an indispensable mechanic; she develops a faint affection for a doctor, Kotaro Kikuchi, whom she meets by chance. Kikuchi works at Montendo Hospital, where his father is chairman, and though he is serious on duty, off the clock he is a trend-conscious young man and a bad rumor about him soon spreads through the neighborhood, stirred up by the meddling tobacco-shop owner Kin Ota.

One day, Chagawa receives a telegram telling him that his father Rintaro, who had disowned him twenty years earlier for wanting to be a novelist, is critically ill. On the way home from the funeral, aboard a KiHa 58 train, he mutters to Hiromi, "Maybe it's because of my father, whom I resented, that I've kept on being a novelist who can't sell." Meanwhile his editor, Tomioka, who also handles the popular newcomer Midorinuma, fights to keep Chagawa's serialization running.

The neighborhood doctor Shiro Takuma, who has lived alone since losing his wife and daughter in the air raids and whom the children still fear as "Akuma-sensei," quietly looks after the residents of Third Street. In an age when many Japanese, doctors included, chase success and money, Dr. Kikuchi takes a different path, devoting himself to free medical care, because seeing people happy brings him joy.
