= Naoki Satō =

Japanese composer (born 1970)

- 佐藤 直紀
- Born: May 2, 1970 (age 56); Chiba, Japan
- Education: Tokyo College of Music
- Occupation: Composer

Naoki Satō (佐藤 直紀, Satō Naoki; born May 2, 1970 in Chiba, Japan) is a Japanese composer. He has provided the music for several popular anime series and films, including the first five Pretty Cure series, X, Eureka Seven, Sword of the Stranger, Assassination Classroom, and Blood-C. He is also known for composing music in live‑action Japanese films such as Space Battleship Yamato, Rurouni Kenshin, Godzilla Minus One and Godzilla Minus Zero.

He graduated from the Tokyo College of Music in 1993. At the 29th Japan Academy Prize in 2006, he won the Best Music prize for his work on the film Always Sanchōme no Yūhi (Always Sunset on Third Street). He also composed music for anime films such as Pretty Cure All Stars DX trilogy, Stand By Me Doraemon. In live-action dramas, he provided music and soundtracks for TV dramas Good Luck!! Water Boys, H2: Kimi to Ita Hibi and Ryōmaden. He provided the music for the Space Battleship Yamato film, as well as the Rurouni Kenshin and Parasyte live-action film series. For the 38th Japan Academy Prize in 2015, he was nominated in the Best Score category for his work in The Eternal Zero. While he did not win the award, The Eternal Zero won several awards including Best Picture, and Stand By Me Doraemon won for Best Animated Film. He composed the music for victory ceremonies at the 2020 Olympic Games in Tokyo.

== Filmography ==
=== Anime ===
| Year | Title | Crew role | Notes | Source |
|---|---|---|---|---|
| 2001–02 | X | Music | OVA and TV | |
| 2003 | Machine Robo Rescue | Music | | |
| 2004–05 | Pretty Cure | Music | | |
| 2005 | Sukisho | Music | | |
| 2005–06 | Eureka Seven | Music | | |
| 2005–06 | Pretty Cure Max Heart | Music | | |
| 2005 | Pretty Cure Max Heart the Movie | Music | Feature film | |
| 2005 | Pretty Cure Max Heart the Movie 2: Friends of the Snow-Laden Sky | Music | Feature film | |
| 2006–07 | PreCure Splash Star | Music | | |
| 2006 | PreCure Splash Star the Move: Tick-Tock Crisis Hanging by a Thin Thread! | Music | Feature film | |
| 2007 | Heroic Age | Music | | |
| 2007 | Sword of the Stranger | Music | | |
| 2007 | Moyashimon | Music | | |
| 2007–08 | Yes! PreCure 5 | Music | | |
| 2007 | Yes! PreCure 5 the Movie: Great Miraculous Adventure in the Mirror Kingdom! | Music | Feature film | |
| 2008–09 | Yes! PreCure 5 GoGo! | Music | | |
| 2008 | Yes! PreCure 5 GoGo! the Movie: Happy Birthday in the Sweets Kingdom | Music | Feature film | |
| 2009 | Pretty Cure All Stars DX: Everyone's Friends - The Collection of Miracles! | Music | Feature film Co-composed with Yasuharu Takanashi | |
| 2009–11 | Eureka Seven: good night, sleep tight, young lovers | Music | | |
| 2010 | Pretty Cure All Stars DX2: Light of Hope - Protect the Rainbow Jewel! | Music | Feature film Co-composed with Yasuharu Takanashi | |
| 2011 | Blood-C | Music | | |
| 2011 | Pretty Cure All Stars DX3: Deliver the Future! The Rainbow-Colored Flower That Connects the World | Music | Feature film | |
| 2011 | Friends: Mononoke Shima no Naki | Music | Feature film | |
| 2012 | Blood-C: The Last Dark | Music | Feature film | |
| 2012 | Chōsoku Henkei Gyrozetter | Music | | |
| 2014 | Stand By Me Doraemon | Music | | |
| 2015 | Assassination Classroom | Music | Also Episode 0 preview in 2014 | |
| 2020 | Stand by Me Doraemon 2 | Music | | |
| 2022 | Dragon Ball Super: Super Hero | Music | Feature film | |
| 2023 | Power of Hope: PreCure Full Bloom | Music | | |

=== Live-action ===
| Year | Title | Crew role | Notes | Source |
|---|---|---|---|---|
| 2003 | Good Luck!! | Music | TV drama | |
| 2003 | Water Boys | Music | TV drama Also 2 and 2005 Natsu | |
| 2004 | Orange Days | Music | | |
| 2005 | Lorelei: The Witch of the Pacific Ocean | Music | | |
| 2005 | H2: Kimi to Ita Hibi | Music | TV drama | |
| 2005 | Always Sanchōme no Yūhi | Music | Film; 28th Japan Academy Prize for Best Score | |
| 2006 | Limit of Love: Umizaru | Music | | |
| 2007 | Barefoot Gen | Music | TV drama | |
| 2007 | Black Belt (Kuro Obi) | Music | Film directed by Shunichi Nagasaki | |
| 2007 | Always Zoku Sanchōme no Yūhi | Music | | |
| 2008 | Kakushi Toride no San-Akunin: The Last Princess | Music | 2008 remake | |
| 2008 | 428: Shibuya Scramble | Music | FMV video game Co-composed with Hideki Sakamoto | |
| 2009 | Ballad: Namonaki Koi no Uta | Music | live-action film | |
| 2010 | Ryōmaden | Music | TV drama (Taiga drama) | |
| 2010 | Space Battleship Yamato | Music | | |
| 2012 | Always Sanchōme no Yūhi '64 | Music | | |
| 2012 | Rurouni Kenshin | Music | | |
| 2012 | Brave Hearts: Umizaru | Music | | |
| 2013 | The Eternal Zero | Music | Nominated – 38th Japan Academy Prize for Best Score | |
| 2014 | Rurouni Kenshin: Kyoto Inferno | Music | | |
| 2014 | Rurouni Kenshin: The Legend Ends | Music | | |
| 2014 | Parasyte: Part 1 | Music | | |
| 2015 | Parasyte: Part 2 | Music | | |
| 2016 | Fueled: The Man They Called Pirate | Music | | |
| 2017 | Destiny: The Tale of Kamakura | Music | | |
| 2018 | Over Drive | Music | | |
| 2019 | The Great War of Archimedes | Music | | |
| 2019 | Masquerade Hotel | Music | | |
| 2021 | Reach Beyond the Blue Sky | Music | TV drama (Taiga drama) | |
| 2021 | Rurouni Kenshin: The Final | Music | | |
| 2021 | Rurouni Kenshin: The Beginning | Music | | |
| 2023 | Yudō | Music | | |
| 2023 | The Legend and Butterfly | Music | | |
| 2023 | Godzilla Minus One | Music | Nominated – 47th Japan Academy Film Prize for Best Score | |
| 2024 | 6 Lying University Students | Music | | |
| 2025 | Black Showman | Music | | |
| 2026 | Godzilla Minus Zero | Music | | |
