= Juvenile (2000 film) =

- Film poster
- Directed by: Takashi Yamazaki
- Written by: Takashi Yamazaki
- Produced by: Shūji Abe; Nobumasa Sawabe; Chikahiro Ando
- Starring: Megumi Hayashibara; Shingo Katori; Anne Suzuki; Yuya Endo; Kyôtaro Shimizu; Yuki; Teruo Takeno
- Cinematography: Kōzō Shibasaki
- Edited by: Yoshio Kitazawa
- Music by: Yasuaki Shimizu
- Distributed by: Toho
- Release date: 15 July 2000 (Japan)
- Running time: 97 minutes
- Country: Japan
- Language: Japanese

Juvenile (Japanese: ジュブナイル, Hepburn: Jubunairu) is a 2000 Japanese science fiction adventure film written and directed by Takashi Yamazaki in his feature-length directorial debut.

== Synopsis ==
Summer, 2000. Eleven-year-old Yusuke and his classmates are camping in a woods when suddenly they see a bright light streak over the treetops and into the woods. The boys take off into the woods towards the light. There in the ground, growing, they find a small round metallic object. Just as Yusuke reaches to touch it, the mysterious object pops up a set of eyes and the object says;

"I am Tetra, I meet Yusuke". Startled Yusuke replies "Your name is Tetra? Cool!"

Tetra is kept from adult eyes in Yusuke's closet. Tetra creates wonderful gadgets using "never-seen-before" technology. It would appear Tetra was designed with artificial intelligence. But where did Tetra come from and what is its purpose? As the relationship grows between Yusuke and Tetra, these questions are answered. Yusuke and his friends, along with the genius physicist Kanzaki, who studies time machines, investigate Tetra's secrets.

Meanwhile, 100,000 kilometers above Earth, a massive fleet of mysterious alien spaceships belonging to the Voidians is anchored, targeting Earth's oceans. With Earth's crisis rapidly approaching, Yusuke, with all his courage, boards the Gungelion, a combat robot created by Tetra, to protect Earth and Misaki, who has been abducted by the Voidians. Will they be able to save Earth? And what will become of Misaki's life?

== Characters ==
- Yusuke Sakamoto (坂本裕介 Sakamoto Yūsuke) - Yusuke is the main character. Yusuke hides Tetra in his room.
- Tetra (テトラ) - Tetra is a robot who has highly advanced artificial intelligence. Tetra came from the future with the keyword "juvenile".
- Soichiro Kanzaki (神崎宗一郎 Kanzaki Sōichirō) - An electronics shop owner who introduces Yusuke to Tetra. Kanzaki is the only adult that the children trust with the secret of Tetra.
- Misaki Kinoshita (木下 岬 Kinoshita Misaki) - One of Yusuke's friends. She wishes to connect Tetra to the internet.
- Noriko Kinoshita (木下範子 Kinoshita Noriko) - Misaki's sister in law. Noriko becomes one of Soichiro's allies in his Physics research.
- Toshiya Matsuoka (松岡俊也 Matsuoka Toshiya) - Misaki's playmate.
- Hidetaka Ohno (大野秀隆 Ōno Hidetaka) - Hidetaka is Toshiya's "gopher." Hidetaka, who is thought to be the source of information at his school, is easily able to find information and proves handy to Yusuke and his friends.

== Cast ==
- Megumi Hayashibara - Tetra (voice) / Female Researcher
- Shingo Katori - Soichiro Kamizaki
- Miki Sakai - Noriko Kinoshita
- Anne Suzuki - Misaki Kinoshita
- Yuya Endo - Yusuke Sakamoto
- Kyotaro Shimizu - Hidetaka Ohno
- Yuki - Toshiya Matsuoka
- Katsumi Takahashi - Yusuke's Father
- Kuniko Asagi - Yusuke's Mother
- Kinzoh Sakura
- Takashi Matsuo - Misawa
- Kazue Tsunogae - Snack Shop Lady
- Teruo Takeno - Byoid (voice)

== Release ==
Toho released a 4K remaster of the film on a limited theatrical run in Japan on 22 November 2024, to commemorate the 25th anniversary of Yamazaki's directorial career.
