= Always: Sunset on Third Street 2 =

- Theatrical release poster
- Directed by: Takashi Yamazaki
- Screenplay by: Takashi Yamazaki; Ryota Kosawa
- Based on: Sunset on Third Street by Ryōhei Saigan
- Produced by: Shūji Abe; Osamu Kamei
- Starring: Hidetaka Yoshioka; Shinichi Tsutsumi; Koyuki; Maki Horikita; Tomokazu Miura; Hiroko Yakushimaru
- Cinematography: Kōzō Shibasaki
- Edited by: Ryūji Miyajima
- Music by: Naoki Satō
- Production companies: Nippon TV; Robot; Shogakukan; VAP; Toho; Dentsu; Yomiuri Shimbun; Shirogumi; Imagica
- Distributed by: Toho; Panasia
- Release date: November 3, 2007
- Running time: 146 minutes
- Country: Japan
- Languages: English; Japanese
- Box office: ¥4.56 billion/or $39,652,173

Always: Sunset on Third Street 2 (Japanese: ALWAYS 続・三丁目の夕日, Hepburn: Always Zoku Sanchōme no Yūhi) is a 2007 Japanese drama film directed by Takashi Yamazaki, based on the manga Sunset on Third Street by Ryōhei Saigan. It is a sequel to Always: Sunset on Third Street (2005). At the 31st Japan Academy Film Prize it won two awards and received eleven other nominations. The film was Godzilla's first full CGI cameo outside of his own film series, and Yamazaki would later go on to direct and write Godzilla Minus One (2023).

== Plot ==
The stage is set at Yuhigacho 3-chome in Shitamachi, Tokyo, Japan in 1959.

The relatives of the Suzuki family temporarily foster their daughter Mika at the Suzuki family. Norifumi, Chie and Rokuko are all very welcoming, but Ippei is very unfriendly to Mika.

Across from the Suzuki family, Ryunosuke continues to raise Junnosuke, but Junnosuke's biological father Kawabuchi keeps trying to take his son back. Ryunosuke promises Kawabuchi that he will let Junnosuke live a normal life. However, with the rise in prices, Ryunosuke's family life is indeed getting more and more difficult. Junnosuke even secretly decides to save money for his lunch, which even shocks the school teachers.

Guangmei has to work in a striptease venue to pay off the debt for her father's medical treatment. A boss in Osaka wants to marry her as his second wife.

Ryunosuke made a desperate attempt to challenge the Akutagawa Prize again. This time, his work was finally selected as the finalist of the Akutagawa Prize, and the people of San-chome were happy for him. However, a man who claimed to be a judge of the Akutagawa Prize came to tell Ryunosuke that he should definitely win the prize, but he lacked "socializing". The people of San-chome raise money for Ryunosuke.

== Cast ==
- Hidetaka Yoshioka
- Shinichi Tsutsumi
- Koyuki
- Maki Horikita
- Hiroko Yakushimaru
- Ayame Koike

== Awards and nominations ==
31st Japan Academy Prize.

- Won: Best Actor – Hidetaka Yoshioka
- Won: Best Sound Recording – Hitoshi Tsurumaki
- Nominated: Best Picture
- Nominated: Best Director – Takashi Yamazaki
- Nominated: Best Screenplay – Takashi Yamazaki and Ryota Kosawa
- Nominated: Best Actor in a Supporting Role – Shinichi Tsutsumi
- Nominated: Best Actress in a Supporting Role – Maki Horikita
- Nominated: Best Actress in a Supporting Role – Hiroko Yakushimaru
- Nominated: Best Music – Naoki Satō
- Nominated: Best Cinematography – Kōzō Shibasaki
- Nominated: Best Lighting Direction – Kenichi Mizuno
- Nominated: Best Art Direction – Anri Jojo
- Nominated: Best Film Editing – Ryuji Miyajima

Asian Film Awards 2008

- Nominated: Best Supporting Actor – Shinichi Tsutsumi
- Nominated: Best Supporting Actress – Hiroko Yakushimaru
- Nominated: Best Visual Effects – Takashi Yamazaki
