= List of Parasyte -the maxim- episodes =

Key visual of the series

Parasyte -the maxim- (Japanese: 寄生獣 セイの格率, Hepburn: Kiseijū: Sei no Kakuritsu) is an anime television series produced by Madhouse, based on the Parasyte manga series written and illustrated by Hitoshi Iwaaki. The series follows Shinichi Izumi, a high school boy whose right hand becomes possessed by an alien parasite who calls itself Migi, finding himself in a battle against other Parasites who feast on humans.

The series aired on Nippon TV between October 9, 2014, and March 26, 2015, and was simulcast by Crunchyroll outside of Asia and by Animax Asia in Southeast Asia and South Asia. The series is licensed in North America by Sentai Filmworks and began airing on Adult Swim's Toonami programming block from October 4, 2015, to April 10, 2016. The opening theme song is "Let Me Hear" performed by Fear, and Loathing in Las Vegas, while the ending theme is "It's the Right Time" performed by Daichi Miura.

The titles of the first 20 episodes correspond to the titles of published literary works including novels, novellas, plays and poetry.

== Episode list ==
No.	Title	Directed by	Written by	Original release date	English air date (Note: Adult Swim lists the series as premiering at 1 a.m. ET/PT on Saturday, which is effectively Sunday.)
1	"The Metamorphosis"; Transliteration: "Henshin" (Japanese: 変身)	Chie Yamashiro	Shōji Yonemura	October 9, 2014	October 4, 2015
Shinichi Izumi wakes up with a bizarre feeling in his right hand on the way to school. His right hand unintentionally gropes fellow student Satomi Murano. During the night before, a Parasite attempted to enter his body through his ear canal in order to control his brain. Since Shinichi wore earphones while sleeping, the Parasite burrowed into his right arm instead. On his way home the next day, Shinichi tries to save a little girl from being run over by a car, and he witnesses his right hand involuntarily stop the car. Confused, he tries to stab his right hand with a knife, though the Parasite reveals its form on his right hand and breaks the knife. Shinichi is now forced to cooperate with the Parasite while keeping it a secret from his parents, Kazuyuki Izumi and Nobuko Izumi. Later on, Shinichi's Parasite directs him to a dog inhabited by another Parasite, and Shinichi is shown that the only way to kill it is to destroy the heart of its host.
2	"The Devil in the Flesh"; Transliteration: "Nikutai no Akuma" (Japanese: 肉体の悪魔)	Naoyuki Kuzuya	Shōji Yonemura	October 16, 2014	October 11, 2015
Shinichi asks for a name to call the Parasite, so it gives itself the name "Migi", meaning "right". After Shinichi impresses Satomi by making the winning shot in a basketball game at school, he apologizes to her for accidentally groping her the previous morning. Kazuki Nagai becomes jealous and picks a fight with Shinichi outside. Shinichi recoils in fear, but Migi forces him to punch Kazuki. Shinichi later hears from friend Yuko Tachikawa that gruesome "mincemeat murders" are being reported in various locations around the world. He learns from Migi that Parasites practice cannibalism merely for survival. Migi senses a Parasite nearby controlling a man named Mr. B, and Shinichi heads to an alley to lead him away from other people. Mr. B invites Migi to join him in order to extend their lifelines, but Migi choose to kill Mr. B and remain with Shinichi, unsure whether relocation is possible for Parasites. The next day, after Shinichi treats Satomi to pancakes, they see three thugs throwing stones at a cat buried in a playground sandbox. Shinichi intervenes, surprising Satomi by his apparent change in personality.
3	"Symposium"; Transliteration: "Kyōen" (Japanese: 饗宴)	Koji Sawai	Shinzō Fujita	October 23, 2014	October 18, 2015
During a school assembly, Shinichi is dismayed to discover that the new math teacher, Ryōko Tamiya, is a Parasite and aware of his secret. After math class, Shinichi privately meets with Ryōko in the counselor's office, where she declares that she is not interested in fighting him and asks him to meet her after school. They meet at a restaurant, where Ryōko introduces her partner Mr. A, and reveals that she is pregnant, establishing that Parasites are capable of reproducing humans when they take over human bodies. Mr. A leaves the restaurant, considering Shinichi to be a threat. The next day during math class, Mr. A ambushes Shinichi's school campus, seeing him as a threat. He attacks staff and forces the students to evacuate. Migi suggests using the crowd of students as a human shield, but Shinichi is against hurting anyone and instead lures Mr. A to the top floor away from the students. As a frightened Shinichi barricades the area with desks, Migi reminds him that they must fight together as Mr. A approaches them.
4	"Disheveled Hair"; Transliteration: "Midaregami" (Japanese: みだれ髪)	Tōru Ishida	Shōji Yonemura	October 30, 2014	October 25, 2015
As Migi and Mr. A exchange rapid attacks, Shinichi is able to puncture Mr. A in the chest with a metal table leg as planned, figuring that Mr. A would underestimate Shinichi as a human. Mortally wounded, Mr. A tries to find Ryōko in the counselor's office, but she sets off an explosion with gas tanks to kill him and escapes to safety. Ryōko is forced to resign from the school once news of her pregnancy reaches her colleagues. Shinichi encounters Ryōko outside, where she explains that every living organism follows a directive, and that Parasites were born to feast on humans. The next day, Migi experiments with separating itself from Shinichi's body for a few minutes. Kazuyuki and Nobuko plan a trip to the beach, though Shinichi worries about their safety because of the mincemeat murders. When Shinichi decides that his parents should go on the trip, they become suspicious of his behavior, but he ensures them that he will be fine during their absence.
5	"The Stranger"; Transliteration: "Ihōjin" (Japanese: 異邦人)	Hiromichi Matano	Shōji Yonemura	November 6, 2014	November 8, 2015 (Note: On October 31–November 1, 2015, Adult Swim ran an Akame ga Kill! marathon on Halloween where they played episodes 4–8 and show extra episodes of 9–11 due to daylight saving time.)
Following comments from his parents and friends, Shinichi suspects that he is undergoing psychological changes. Upon seeing a gang of delinquents led by Mitsuo assaulting Kazuki, Shinichi steps in to help but takes a beating. Before the gang leaves, a female gang member named Kana Kimishima detects something off about Shinichi's nature. After school, Mitsuo and his gang abduct Satomi. Refusing help from Migi, Shinichi is no match for Mitsuo. A senior student named Kamijou arrives with a large group of friends to deal with Mitsuo, allowing Shinichi to walk Satomi to his house for a while. After Satomi leaves, Kana shows up to apologize to Shinichi, but she detects something strange when she shakes hands with him. Migi deduces that Kana can sense wavelengths perceptible to Parasites. Meanwhile, a Parasite, which has been searching for a replacement female body, kills and possesses Nobuko before attacking Kazuyuki. Shinichi receives a call from Kazuyuki warning him about Nobuko. He is shocked when Nobuko arrives home and stabs him through his chest.
6	"The Sun Also Rises"; Transliteration: "Hi wa Mata Noboru" (Japanese: 日はまた昇る)	Chie Yamashiro	Shōji Yonemura	November 13, 2014	November 15, 2015
After Nobuko leaves, Migi merges into Shinichi's body to seal the hole inside his heart, thereby saving his life. Although Shinichi gains heightened senses, he is shown to be emotionally distant as a result. After being informed that Kazuyuki is in the hospital, Shinichi vows to kill the Parasite controlling Nobuko. On the way there to the hospital, he meets Makiko Hayase, a young student working at an inn nearby. At the hospital, Shinichi becomes angry when Kazuyuki was told that he suffered a head injury, soon realizing that Kazuyuki is unable to face the truth about what happened at the beach. Shinichi stays at inn while planning to find the Parasite responsible for Nobuko's death. Migi explains that its senses become inoperative while it falls asleep for four hours daily ever since it repaired Shinichi's heart. The following day, as Makiko tries to flirt with Shinichi, Migi senses a Parasite nearby. Shinichi runs at a surprisingly inhuman speed towards the end of the seawall, where he sees someone who may be responsible for Nobuko's death.
7	"A Dark Night's Passing"; Transliteration: "An'ya Kōro" (Japanese: 暗夜行路)	Yūki Inaba	Shinzō Fujita	November 20, 2014	November 22, 2015
Shinichi meets Mamoru Uda, a human who has a Parasite named Joe fused into his jawline, which saved him from drowning in the sea after falling off a cliff. Mamoru hears the story about how Shinichi first encountered Migi and how Kazuyuki ended up in the hospital. Later, Shinichi learns that Migi scattered its cells throughout Shinichi's body to close his heart wound, explaining Shinichi's physiological changes, such as enhanced hearing, speed and reflexes. Mamoru senses Nobuko, and Shinichi heads in her direction. However, Migi falls asleep after morphing into a scythe, leaving Shinichi to fight by himself. Mamoru is badly wounded by Nobuko, and Shinichi arrives to fight Nobuko alone. Nobuko wounds Shinichi, but Mamoru executes a surprise attack, thereby killing Nobuko. After saying goodbye to Makiko and contemplating about Nobuko's death with Kazuyuki, Shinichi returns back to school.
8	"Freezing Point"; Transliteration: "Hyōten" (Japanese: 氷点)	Koji Sawai	Shōji Yonemura	November 27, 2014	December 6, 2015 (Note: On the broadcast night of November 28–29, 2015, Adult Swim hosted a marathon where they played the first seven episodes of the show.)
Mitsuo suspects that Kana has a crush on Shinichi and picks a fight with him, but Shinichi uses his newfound strength to easily defend himself. Satomi observes that Shinichi inherited a colder personality, especially when he throws a dead puppy into a garbage bin. After Satomi leaves, Shinichi later gives the puppy a proper burial upon realizing that he has begun thinking like Migi, having lost the ability to cry. At school, Shinichi encounters Hideo Shimada, a Parasite disguised as a transfer student sent by Ryōko, but Migi does not detect Hideo as a threat. Believing Shinichi to be her soulmate, Kana detects someone approaching, but it turns out to be Hideo. Shinichi arrives and warns Hideo to stay away from his friends, although Shinichi acknowledges that Kana has the ability to sense wavelengths of something greater than she can imagine. That night, Hideo changes his face to look like a model and lures a girl into an alley in order to feast on her body.
9	"Beyond Good and Evil"; Transliteration: "Zen'aku no Higan" (Japanese: 善悪の彼岸)	Shinichi Kawamura	Shinzō Fujita	November 27, 2014	December 13, 2015
Hideo wonders why Shinichi cannot always sense his presence and thinks that Migi may have a weakness. The chief of police Takizawa interviews Kazuyuki about the Parasite that killed Nobuko. Kazuyuki confirms the Parasite's likeness of Nobuko in a sketch drawn by Haruki Tachikawa, a criminal profiling illustrator and Yuko's older brother. After becoming suspicious of Hideo, Yuko later witnesses Hideo being hit by a baseball but remaining uninjured. While attempting to patch things up with Satomi, Shinichi is interrupted by Migi, who senses Hideo preparing to take on Mitsuo and his gang. Shinichi dismisses Hideo and warns the gang to leave Hideo alone. Later, Satomi maintains her distance because of Shinichi's changed personality. Meanwhile, Yuko follows Hideo and discovers his ability to change his face, sharing this knowledge with Haruki. The next day, Yuko confronts Hideo about his identity in the art classroom, unaware of the risks.
10	"What Mad Universe"; Transliteration: "Hakkyō-shita Uchū" (Japanese: 発狂した宇宙)	Michita Shiraishi	Shōji Yonemura	December 4, 2014	January 3, 2016
Before jumping out the window to safety, Yuko throws a bottle of paint thinner at Hideo when he attacks her. The chemical causes Hideo to lose his mind and enter an uncontrolled killing spree. Although an evacuation is initiated, seventeen victims among students, teachers and even policemen are gradually massacred by Hideo. This prompts Shinichi to rescue Satomi and take her far away from campus. Migi senses that Hideo is on the school rooftop. Shinichi travels to the roof of another building 300 meters away, where Migi helps him fling a rock through Hideo's chest, thereby killing Hideo. At a high level government meeting, the existence of Parasites is kept a secret from the public. A scientist named Dr. Yui reports that Parasites can be identified by plucking hair from anywhere on the body to ascertain its physiology because the hair stays alive for a short time. Consequently, a new form of greeting becomes popular, pulling out a strand of each other's hair. Shinichi finally patches things up with Satomi after she thanks him for saving her.
11	"The Blue Bird"; Transliteration: "Aoi Tori" (Japanese: 青い鳥)	Hiromichi Matano	Shōji Yonemura	December 11, 2014	January 10, 2016
Shinichi hesitates to tell Kana the truth about his condition, though he is worried that she can detect his presence and other Parasites. However, when Satomi questions Kana about Shinichi's change in personality, Kana denies noticing any difference. Meanwhile, a Parasite named Gotou, disguised as a male wearing gym clothing, murders twenty-two armed members of a yakuza organization in an experiment to test his fighting ability against armed humans without resorting to Parasite weaponry, taking three hits in the process and taking control of a businessman afterwards to hide his identity. The next day, Shinichi feels that Migi truly has merged with him, especially while on a date with Satomi when he experiences pain in his chest after seeing a mother withhold herself from slapping her disobedient child. Kana becomes dejected after she witnesses Shinichi sharing his first kiss with Satomi after a date. Later, Migi senses eight Parasites at the mayoral campaign of promoting environmentalism, led by Takeshi Hirokawa. Although Hirokawa detects Shinichi's presence, Migi cannot identify Hirokawa's motives.
12	"Heart"; Transliteration: "Kokoro" (Japanese: こころ)	Chie Yamashiro	Shōji Yonemura	December 25, 2014	January 17, 2016
Shinichi and Migi conclude that Hirokawa is running for mayor to create a safe haven for Parasites. Shinichi encounters Kana and becomes concerned that her ability may place her in danger. He arranges to meet her in an abandoned building, where he reveals the truth to her about Parasites while Migi is asleep. Although Kana brushes it off as a joke, Shinichi promises to show Migi to her one day. Later, Migi reveals to Shinichi that Kana emits a weak signal detectable by Parasites, meaning that they can also seek her out. Shinichi convinces Migi to reveal his true form when planning to meet with Kana at a train station, but he cancels the meeting after detecting Parasites. Kana assumes that Shinichi will be at the abandoned building again and uses her instincts to track him. Instead, she encounters a Parasite hosting a man, who stabs her through the chest just as Shinichi arrives. Shinichi rips out the man's heart in blind rage, surprising Migi with his strength, and Kana dies in Shinichi's arms. At Kana's funeral, Shinichi exhibits a calm demeanor in a time of mourning, placing his humanity in question.
13	"Hello Sadness"; Transliteration: "Kanashimi yo Konnichi wa" (Japanese: 悲しみよこんにちは)	Naoyuki Kuzuya	Shinzō Fujita	January 8, 2015	January 24, 2016
The newly elected mayor Hirokawa holds a board meeting with Reiko Tamura, previously Ryōko Tamiya before giving birth to her son, about Kana's death. Being put in charge of investigating Shinichi's involvement in the matter, Reiko hires a private investigator named Shiro Kuramori and arranges for a group of thugs to attack Shinichi in hopes of exploiting Shinichi's right hand, but to no avail. Meanwhile, Yuko tells Satomi about Shinichi's indifference to Kana's death, which unsettles Satomi. At night, Shiro follows Shinichi, who returns to the abandoned building to mourn for Kana's death. Shiro sees Migi, who attempts to kill Shiro. Shinichi desperately restrains Migi, allowing Shiro to escape. The next day, Shinichi and Migi watch video footage from Shiro's camcorder, making Shinichi believe that he is being targeted as a lab rat. Days later, Shinichi sees the wounded Shiro still following him. In the evening, Shinichi meets Satomi at the playground, but he hesitates to tell her the truth about himself, which drives a deeper wedge between them.
14	"The Selfish Gene"; Transliteration: "Rikoteki na Idenshi" (Japanese: 利己的な遺伝子)	Koji Sawai	Shōji Yonemura	January 15, 2015	January 31, 2016
Shinichi seeks out Mamoru to help capture and interrogate Shiro. Meanwhile, when Shiro tells Reiko that he was attacked by Shinichi's right hand, she disbelieves him and terminates his services. Shinichi and Mamoru abduct Shiro to the abandoned building, where Shinichi explains the events leading to Kana's death. Shiro is still suspicious until Migi physically threatens him and reveals that his employer Reiko is a Parasite. The next day, Shinichi meets Reiko at the roof of a university after she attends a lecture on aspects of human behavior. She explains that she is interested in the evolution of Parasites, from a dependence on killing and eating humans to a form of coexistence, but an unequal one. When Reiko taunts Shinichi about Nobuko's death, he tries to fight her, but she uses her baby as a human shield. The unbearable pain in his chest causes him to run away. Shinichi chances upon a fortune teller, who says that he must find the person who put a hole in his heart to achieve closure, but he laughs at the fact that he already killed that person, who is his mother.
15	"Something Wicked This Way Comes"; Transliteration: "Nanika ga Michi o Yattekuru" (Japanese: 何かが道をやって来る)	Tōru Ishida; Kenichi Kawamura	Shinzō Fujita	January 22, 2015	February 7, 2016
Hirokawa has been securing "dining areas" for the Parasites, who are a part of his cabal. Shiro brings Shinichi and Migi to a parking garage, where they witness Kawada, a Parasite hosting a man, murder an innocent woman. Shiro records video footage of Shinichi and Migi defeating Kawada in an intense battle. However, Shiro decides to get rid of the video footage and withdraw from investigating Parasites. Shinichi vows to kill the Parasites one by one. Meanwhile, Hirokawa sees Shinichi as a threat because of his intervention in the parking garage and enlists Gotou to dispose of him. While at school, Migi detects three Parasites with the intention of killing Shinichi. While running for his life, Shinichi is dismayed when Migi falls asleep for four hours. To make matters worse, Miki, another Parasite sent by Hirokawa, manages to catch up to Shinichi in the middle of the road. Shinichi and Migi are alarmed to find that the three Parasites all share the body of Miki.
16	"Happy Family"; Transliteration: "Kōfuku na Katei" (Japanese: 幸福な家庭)	Yūki Inaba	Shōji Yonemura	January 29, 2015	February 14, 2016
Shinichi and Migi head to the woods in order to decapitate Miki, only to discover that Miki is a part of Gotou, who is actually composed of five Parasites, each hosting the limbs and the head. Shinichi flees by hitching a ride. Outside a restaurant, Shinichi contacts Kazuyuki, warning him to leave the house because he might be targeted. Meanwhile, Shiro is traumatized when his office was burned and his family was killed by Kusano, Hikawa and Maesawa, who are three members of Hirokawa's cabal. Shiro is interrogated by a detective named Hirama concerning what has happened. Reiko berates Kusano, Hikawa and Maesawa for not killing Shiro. Kusano, Hikawa and Maesawa do not trust Reiko, who sees the human race much stronger than realized. At night, Shiro discreetly follows Reiko, who is soon surrounded by Kusano, Hikawa and Maesawa.
17	"The Adventure of the Dying Detective"; Transliteration: "Hinshi no Tantei" (Japanese: 瀕死の探偵)	Hiromichi Matano	Shinzō Fujita	February 5, 2015	February 21, 2016
At a municipal construction site, Reiko deals with Kusano, Hikawa and Maesawa, secreting a fragment of herself as a distraction to defeat them separately. Reiko returns home only to find that her son has been kidnapped by Shiro, who left a note to meet him at the park. She contacts Shinichi to meet her there as well. Satomi, worrying about Shinichi, tries to follow Reiko, but loses track of her. When Reiko arrives at a bridge in the park, Shiro threatens throw her son to his death, accusing her of being a coldblooded monster. Surprising even herself, Reiko stabs Shiro and retrieves her son before Shiro falls over the railing. Hirama reaches the dying Shiro, who identifies Reiko before he passes away. As it begins to snow, Shinichi comes face-to-face with Reiko.
18	"More Than Human"; Transliteration: "Ningen Ijō" (Japanese: 人間以上)	Chie Yamashiro	Shōji Yonemura	February 12, 2015	February 28, 2016
Reiko tells Shinichi how her research has shown that Parasites and humans are part of a single biosystem, and that Parasites depend on humans to survive. Hirama and his men open fire on Reiko. To Migi's shock, Reiko does not fight back or flee even though she has the ability to. She entrusts Shinichi with her son before she dies. Shinichi sees his mother in Reiko and recalls Kana and his friends who have died. For the first time since merging with Migi, Shinichi cries, which Satomi happily witnesses. Suspicious of his constant encounters with Parasites, Hirama takes Shinichi to an interrogation room, where he is brought face-to-face with Uragami, a prisoner and serial killer who claims that he can discern Parasites.
19	"In Cold Blood"; Transliteration: "Reiketsu" (Japanese: 冷血)	Michita Shiraishi	Shōji Yonemura	February 19, 2015	March 6, 2016
Uragami does not detect anything inhuman deep in Shinichi's eyes, much to Hirama's frustration. Hirama suggest for police officer Yamagishi to use Uragami in an upcoming tactical operation to take down the Parasites, though Yamagishi considers this operation as "pest control". As the school year comes to an end, Shinichi makes record time on the running track during physical education class. When he later talks with Satomi, he is approached by Hirama, who recruits him to participate in the operation, much to Satomi's frustration. Thanks to a previous conversation with Migi, Shinichi advises Yamagishi to use a flamethrower as the primary weapon of combat. During the operation, Yamagishi and his squad evacuate civilians from the town hall, using high-tech equipment to scout out the Parasites among the humans.
20	"Crime and Punishment"; Transliteration: "Tsumi to Batsu" (Japanese: 罪と罰)	Koji Sawai	Shinzō Fujita	February 26, 2015	March 13, 2016
As the evacuation continues, the civilians panic when a Parasite hosting a girl damages the high-tech equipment from the outside. Yamagishi and his squad start sacrificing human lives inside the lobby to shoot down the Parasites, which gives Hirokawa and his cabal the opportunity to slip away. Yamagishi takes Uragami with him and orders the squad to branch out to the other floors of the town hall and kill more Parasites. Shinichi sits idly by, worried about the operation. Some squad members hit a wall when encountering Gotou, who easily absorbs and deflects the bullets shot at him. Other squad members storm the auditorium, where Hirokawa is there waiting for them.
21	"Sex and Spirit"; Transliteration: "Sei to Sei" (Japanese: 性と聖)	Tōru Ishida	Shōji Yonemura	March 5, 2015	March 20, 2016
Hirokawa blames the humans to be the infection of the earth, since they cannot accept the Parasites to live among them. After he is shot to death by the squad members, he is revealed to be a human and not a Parasite. Uragami makes his escape after shooting Hirama's partner Katsumata. Gotou eventually wipes out all the squad members inside the town hall. Yamagishi is beheaded by Gotou on the roof of the town hall. Gotou meets Shinichi outside and vows to kill him before leaving to replenish his energy. The next day, Shinchi skips school but is driven into fear and paranoia, imagining Gotou everywhere and realizing that he is unprotected while Migi sleeps. Shinichi breaks down when Satomi visits him outside his house, and he runs away. She later finds him at the playground and invites him to her house. They make love to each other, which renews his will to survive.
22	"Quiescence and Awakening"; Transliteration: "Sei to Sei" (Japanese: 静と醒)	Naoyuki Kuzuya	Shōji Yonemura	March 12, 2015	March 27, 2016
Shinichi and Migi attempt to kill Gotou by crashing a car into him when driving off a cliff, but he survives. They then try to ambush Gotou in a forest, where Migi separates from Shinichi for a surprise attack. Their attack plan fails and Migi sacrifices himself to enable Shinichi to escape, leaving Shinichi heartbroken. Injured and alone, Shinichi is taken in by an old woman named Mitsuyo, who lets him stay at her house for a few days. He finds that Migi's cells are still within his body. When nearby villagers inform Mitsuyo that another villager was killed, Shinichi realizes that Gotou was responsible. He tells Mitsuyo about the monster and decides to confront the Parasite on his own. Mitsuyo tells Shinichi not to throw his life away. After Mitsuyo accepts that Shinichi is still determined to risk himself, she sends him off with a cleaver and wishes him good luck.
23	"Life and Oath"; Transliteration: "Sei to Sei" (Japanese: 生と誓)	Hiromichi Matano	Shōji Yonemura	March 19, 2015	April 3, 2016
Gotou wakes up from his sleep when Shinichi hunts for him in the forest at night. However, Shinichi is definitely no match for Gotou and takes a savage beating. Shinichi eventually manages to pierce Gotou with a metal pipe from a dump of toxic waste. When Gotou attempts to strike Shinichi, a fragment of Migi emerges from Shinichi's right arm and counters the blow, reuniting with the rest of himself absorbed by Gotou. Infected with toxins from the metal pipe, the other Parasites in Gotou's body reject his brain, allowing Migi to destroy the body. As Gotou's body tries to regenerate, Shinichi is left with the decision between preserving or destroying Gotou's body. While initially deciding to let Gotou live, he is convinced by Migi to destroy Gotou's body for the sake of humanity.
24	"Parasyte"; Transliteration: "Kiseijū" (Japanese: 寄生獣)	Chie Yamashiro	Shōji Yonemura	March 26, 2015	April 10, 2016
One year after the town hall incident, the mincemeat murders have stopped occurring. In a dream, Shinichi is saddened when Migi bids him farewell and prepares to hibernate, not long before bringing up memories of his deceased loved ones. Shinichi wakes up with a restored right hand. While on a date with Satomi, Shinichi contemplates on how it is contradictory for humanity to love the earth without loving themselves. Later, Uragami appears and abducts Satomi, taking her to the roof of a building. When Shinichi catches up to them, Uragami explains how humanity is filled with monsters, commenting that Shinichi is halfway between the humans and the Parasites. However, Satomi expresses that she finally understands Shinichi as a person. As Uragami throws Satomi over the ledge, Shinichi knocks him out but fails to save her. Migi appears in Shinichi's mind and tells him that he should do the holding now. Shinichi finds his right hand holding Satomi's left hand. As he pulls her up to safety, he thanks Migi for still being there and coming back to help him.
