= Parasyte: Part 2 =

- 寄生獣 完結編
- Directed by: Takashi Yamazaki
- Screenplay by: Ryota Kosawa; Takashi Yamazaki
- Based on: Parasyte by Hitoshi Iwaaki
- Produced by: Shūji Abe
- Starring: Shota Sometani; Eri Fukatsu; Sadao Abe; Ai Hashimoto; Hirofumi Arai; Hideto Iwai; Takashi Yamanaka; Pierre Taki; Kōsuke Toyohara; Nao Ōmori; Kazuki Kitamura; Jun Kunimura; Tadanobu Asano
- Cinematography: Shoichi Ato
- Edited by: Junnosuke Hogaki
- Music by: Naoki Satō
- Production companies: Robot; Toho Pictures; Office Abe Shuji
- Distributed by: Toho
- Release date: April 25, 2015 (Japan)
- Running time: 117 minutes
- Country: Japan
- Language: Japanese

Parasyte: Part 2 (Japanese: 寄生獣 完結編, Hepburn: Kiseijū: Kanketsu-hen) is a 2015 Japanese science fiction action horror film directed by Takashi Yamazaki, starring Shota Sometani. It is the second film of the two Parasyte films, and was preceded by Parasyte: Part 1.

== Plot ==
The police use serial killer Uragami to identify parasites among humans, as he has a special ability to detect them; however, he is unable to correctly identify Shinichi Izumi. A few months after the events of the previous film, Shinichi continues to track down and kill the parasites who terrorize the human world for food, with help from Migi, the parasite that infects his right hand. He learns that he is being tracked by Shiro Kuramori, a reporter hired by parasite Ryoko Tamiya. Shiro discovers the truth about Migi, and plans to expose Shinichi. Shinichi tells Shiro that Tamiya is a parasite, and urges him to stop getting involved for the sake of his safety. Tamiya meanwhile, has given birth to her human son and slowly learns how to become a mother, growing furiously protective of her baby and killing her fellow parasites when they threaten him.

Despite Shinichi's warning, Kuramori goes on to record his conversation with mayor Takeshi Hirokawa, who secretly heads an organization composed of parasites. Hirokawa orders the parasites to kill Kuramori, but they are only successful in killing his daughter. Swearing revenge, Kuramori kidnaps Tamiya's son and calls her to a park so she can see him kill the baby. Despite Tamiya and Shinichi's attempts to convince him otherwise, Kuramori almost goes through with his plan, resulting in his death at Tamiya's hands. When Tamiya then approaches Shinichi, the police fatally shoot her. Instead of defending herself, Tamiya protects her child, explaining to Shinichi that she now knows what it is to be human. She hands her son over to Shinichi before dying, reminding Shinichi of his own mother.

At the same time, a secret service team evacuates the town hall upon discovering Hirokawa's true alignment. They are able to kill nearly all of the parasites as well as Hirokawa himself, who turns out to be a human who supports parasites and distrusts humans. The remaining parasite, Goto, turns out to be too powerful for the team, as his body contains five parasites. He massacres the team and begins his pursuit of Shinichi. Cornered at a forest, Migi sacrifices himself to allow Shinichi to escape.

Shinichi mourns Migi and is comforted by his girlfriend, Satomi Murano. The next morning, Shinichi discovers that a part of Migi is still in his right hand, thanks to his body being infected with Migi's cells in the previous film. He lures Goto to a disposal facility and is able to fatally injure him. At first reluctant in killing him, Shinichi ultimately decides that he wants to protect his loved ones, and finishes Goto off. Back home, Migi tells a dismayed Shinichi that since the parasites have died down, he will now go into hibernation to achieve an evolution, presumably up to the point where the two will never see each other again, breaking Shinichi's heart.

A few years later, Shinichi and Satomi visit the now toddler son of Tamiya, who is named Taiki Tamiya. Afterward, Uragami appears, kidnaps Satomi, and takes her to a roof. He states his belief that humans are the real monsters and asks for Shinichi's opinion, since he is certain that Shinichi is a parasite. However, with Satomi's encouragement, Shinichi defies Uragami's opinion and successfully saves Satomi with help from Migi, who had momentarily awakened from his dormant state to help him.

== Cast ==
- Shota Sometani as Shinichi Izumi
- Eri Fukatsu as Ryoko Tamiya
- Sadao Abe as Migi
- Ai Hashimoto as Satomi Murano
- Hirofumi Arai as Uragami
- Pierre Taki as Miki
- Takashi Yamanaka as Tsuji (辻)
- Hideto Iwai as Kusano
- Nao Ōmori as Shiro Kuramori
- Kōsuke Toyohara as Yamagishi
- Kazuki Kitamura as Takeshi Hirokawa
- Jun Kunimura as Hirama
- Tadanobu Asano as Goto

== Reception ==
Edmund Lee of South China Morning Post gave the film 2 and a half stars out of 5. Elizabeth Kerr of The Hollywood Reporter described it as "a prime example of filmmakers, production houses and distributors hoping to squeeze one more box office hit out of their source material that doesn't always demand it, the net result being a struggle for content". James Marsh of Twitch Film felt that "[the] sci-fi, horror and adventure elements of the story are all sidelined here, and the result is a fairly underwhelming experience, albeit one retaining glimpses of scattered promise and invention left largely unrealised." Mark Schilling of The Japan Times said, "the message is that humans and parasites are both living products of the same indifferent universe, facing many of the same survival problems, if not solving them the same way."

== Accolades ==
Award nominations for Parasyte: Part 2
Year	Award	Category	Recipient	Result
2015	Nippon Connection Japanese Film Festival	Best Film	Takashi Yamazaki	Nominated
