= Stop Jap =

Studio album by The Stalin
- Released: 1 July 1982
- Recorded: 5 – 12 March; 18 – 2 March, 3 May 1982
- Studio: Rockwell Studio, Hakone; Sunrise Studio, Tokyo
- Genre: Punk, hardcore punk
- Length: 34:19
- Label: Tokuma Onkou
- Producer: Mikio Moriwaki

The Stalin chronology
Trash (1981)	Stop Jap (1982)	Mushi (1984)

Stop Jap is the second album by Japanese hardcore punk band The Stalin, released on July 1, 1982. In September 2007, Rolling Stone Japan rated Stop Jap #27 on their list of the 100 greatest Japanese rock albums of all time. It was named number 22 on Bounce's 2009 list of 54 Standard Japanese Rock Albums.

The first pressing contained a lyric sheet for "Meat" and was pressed on red vinyl. An additional cover of The Doors' "Light My Fire" and The Stooges' song "No Fun" was available on the cassette version that had been released at the same time.

Stop Jap was The Stalin's second full-length album. It was, contrary to the album Trash, easy to purchase right from the start. This was due to the efforts of Tokuma Onkou, the new record label The Stalin signed to. Some of the tracks on the album are old tracks with different titles and adapted lyrics.

== Track listing ==
All lyrics are written by Michiro Endo; all music is composed by The Stalin, except where noted

Side one
No.	Title	Length
1.	"Romanticist" (ロマンチスト Romanchisuto)	2:09
2.	"Stop Jap"	1:50
3.	"Gokuraku Tonbo" (極楽トンボ, Happy-Go-Lucky)	0:45
4.	"Tama Negi Hatake" (玉ネギ畑, Onion Field)	2:25
5.	"Sōsēji no Medama" (ソーセージの目玉, Eyeballs of Sausage)	1:15
6.	"Gesuidō no Petenshi" (下水道のペテン師, Swindler in the Sewer)	1:54
7.	"Allergy α" (アレルギーα Arerugī α)	0:53
8.	"Yokujō" (欲情, Lust)	1:43
9.	"Money"	3:23

Side two
No.	Title	Length
1.	"Stop Girl"	3:56
2.	"Burst Head" (爆裂(バースト)ヘッド Bāsuto Heddo)	2:39
3.	"Miser"	2:42
4.	"Makeinu" (負け犬, Loser)	2:03
5.	"Allergy β" (アレルギーβ Arerugī β)	0:53
6.	"Warushawa no Gensō" (ワルシャワの幻想, Fantasy in Warsaw)	5:30

Bonus tracks (2003 Digital Remaster Edition)
No.	Title	Lyrics	Music	Length
16.	"Light My Fire" (from single "Romantist")	John Densmore, Ray Manzarek, Jim Morrison, Endo	Densmore, Manzarek, Morrison	1:58
17.	"Allergy" (アレルギー Arerugī) (single version)			0:54
18.	"No Fun" (from single "Allergy")	Iggy Pop, Scott Asheton, Dave Alexander, Ron Asheton, Endo	Pop, S. Asheton, Alexander, R. Asheton	3:00
19.	"Warushawa no Gensō" (ワルシャワの幻想, Fantasy in Warsaw) (Unpublished live version) (Recorded at Hibiya Open-Air Concert Hall 1982.5.8)			6:02
20.	"Artist" (アーチスト Āchisuto) (Unpublished live version) (Recorded at Hibiya Open-Air Concert Hall 1982.5.8)			3:49

== Credits ==
=== Band members ===
- Michiro Endo – vocals
- Kazuo "Tam" Tamura – guitar
- Shintaro Sugiyama – bass
- Jun Inui – drums

=== Staff/crew ===
- Mikio Moriwaki – producer
- Masafumi Kato – director
