= Tamashii =

Tamashii may refer to:

- Group Tamashii, a Japanese rock band
- Tamashii, a professional wrestling event series by New Japan Pro Wrestling
