= Mushi =

Mushi can refer to:

- Mushi, Afghanistan
- Mushi, Tengzhou (木石镇), town in Tengzhou City, Shandong, China
- Mushi, an album by Japanese hardcore punk group The Stalin.
- Mushi (biblical figure), an individual mentioned in the Hebrew Bible.
- Mushi, the creatures in the Japanese manga Mushishi.
- Refugee alias of Iroh
- Mushi Production
- Mushi Sanban, a fictional character in the animated series Codename: Kids Next Door
