= Parasyte: Part 1 =

- Japanese theatrical release poster
- Kanji: 寄生獣
- Literal meaning: Parasite
- Revised Hepburn: Kisei-jū
- Directed by: Takashi Yamazaki
- Screenplay by: Ryota Kosawa; Takashi Yamazaki
- Based on: Parasyte by Hitoshi Iwaaki
- Produced by: Shūji Abe
- Starring: Shota Sometani; Eri Fukatsu; Ai Hashimoto; Masahiro Higashide; Hideto Iwai; Takashi Yamanaka; Shuji Okui; Mansaku Ikeuchi; Kōsuke Toyohara; Nao Ōmori; Kazuki Kitamura; Kimiko Yo; Jun Kunimura; Tadanobu Asano
- Cinematography: Shoichi Ato
- Edited by: Junnosuke Hogaki
- Music by: Naoki Satō
- Production companies: Robot; Toho Pictures; Office Abe Shuji
- Distributed by: Toho
- Release dates: October 30, 2014 (Tokyo); November 29, 2014 (Japan)
- Running time: 109 minutes
- Country: Japan
- Language: Japanese
- Box office: ¥2 billion

Parasyte: Part 1 (Japanese: 寄生獣, Hepburn: Kiseijū) is a 2014 Japanese science fiction action film directed by Takashi Yamazaki, starring Shota Sometani. It is the first film of the two Parasyte films, and was followed by Parasyte: Part 2. The films are based on the manga series Parasyte by Hitoshi Iwaaki.

== Plot ==
Mysterious aliens called "Parasites" suddenly begin their invasion when some of them infect humans by entering their brain. One of them attempts to enter the brain of high school student Shinichi Izumi, but resorts to infecting his right hand after failing to bypass his headphones. Thanks to this way of entry, Shinichi retains his human consciousness, unlike the other victims. After his initial shock, Shinichi befriends the parasite and names him "Migi" (Japanese for "right").

The parasites terrorize humanity by secretly killing them as sources of food. Shinichi himself has to fend against the parasites who are disgusted of the fact that his body exhibits two consciousnesses. One of the parasites also possesses Shinichi's teacher, Ryoko Tamiya; however, Tamiya is a lot more reasonable and is interested in studying the humans' way of life, which she does by becoming impregnated with fellow parasite Mr. A. Tamiya explains that despite having parasite parents, the baby she carries is a normal human.

When Mr. A's attack on Shinichi fails and results in his vessel's destruction, he transfers his consciousness to Shinichi's mother, Nobuko. Nobuko returns home and mortally injures Shinichi, although Migi manages to save him by using his essence to renew his heart, essentially infecting Shinichi's entire body with Migi's particles. Since then, Shinichi's personality starts to merge with that of Migi, namely, being apathetic to emotions; this results in Shinichi's estrangement from his girlfriend, Satomi Murano.

Meanwhile, an underling of Tamiya, Takeshi Hirokawa, runs for mayorship in order to set up the town for the parasites' interests. Another parasite, Hideo Shimada transfers to Shinichi's school and initially acts friendly, but when a student discovers his true identity, he massacres the students. Shinichi is able to kill Shimada, who is left to his fate by Tamiya due to a disfigurement that Satomi causes, which makes him unable to control himself. Tamiya gives Shinichi the location of the Mr. A-possessed Nobuko before leaving the scene. At their meeting, Nobuko is able to overcome her parasite's consciousness long enough for Shinichi to safely kill her.

The epilogue details Hirokawa's successful run for mayorship, the appearance of the mysterious parasite Goto, as well as Shinichi's visit to Satomi at the hospital, where an unknown individual records him talking with Migi.

== Cast ==
- Shota Sometani as Shinichi Izumi
- Eri Fukatsu as Ryoko Tamiya
- Sadao Abe as Migi
- Ai Hashimoto as Satomi Murano
- Masahiro Higashide as Hideo Shimada
- Mansaku Ikeuchi as Mr. A
- Shuji Okui as Chef of Chinese Restaurant
- Takashi Yamanaka as Tsuji (辻)
- Hideto Iwai as Kusano
- Nao Ōmori as Shiro Kuramori
- Kimiko Yo as Nobuko Izumi
- Kōsuke Toyohara as Yamagishi
- Kazuki Kitamura as Takeshi Hirokawa
- Jun Kunimura as Hirama
- Tadanobu Asano as Goto

== Production ==
=== Development ===
In 2005, New Line Cinema had acquired the film rights to Parasyte in 2005, and a film adaptation was reported to be in the works, with Jim Henson Studios and Don Murphy was set to be in charge of production. New Line Cinema's option expired in 2013, prompting a bidding war in Japan. Film studio and distributor Toho won the rights.

=== Casting ===
Shota Sometani was cast as the protagonist Shinichi Izumi, Eri Fukatsu as high school teacher Ryoko Tamiya, and Ai Hashimoto as Shinichi's girlfriend Satomi Murano.

== Release ==
Parasyte: Part 1 screened at the 27th Tokyo International Film Festival as the closing film on October 30, 2014.

The film was released on November 29, 2014, in Japan.

Funimation licensed both Part 1 and Part 2 for Blu-ray, DVD, and Digital HD release on May 8, 2018, which included English dubs of both films.

== Reception ==
=== Box office ===
The film topped the box office on its opening weekend in Japan, earning $2.9 million from 256,000 admissions on 418 screens. It grossed around ¥800 million at the Japanese box office after two weeks. The film grossed CN¥48.3 million at the Chinese box office.

=== Critical reception ===
Mark Schilling of The Japan Times gave the film 3 1/2 stars out of 5, saying, "I couldn't call myself a fan of the manga, but the film adaptation of Parasyte hits the hard-to-find sweet spot between black comedy and serious sci-fi/horror". Peter Debruge of Variety in his favorable review felt that "[the film] marks an entertaining new iteration in the body-horror category, as if someone had grafted a very dark high-school comedy onto a David Cronenberg movie." Meanwhile, Christopher O'Keeffe of Twitch Film in his unfavorable review commented that "Parasyte: Part 1 spends a great deal of time laying the groundwork for the concluding chapter and its charmless aliens and the scarcity of action in early scenes fail to make it stand on its own."

== Accolades ==
Award nominations for Parasyte: Part 1
Year	Award	Category	Recipient	Result
2015	Asian Film Awards	Best Visual Effects	Takashi Yamazaki	Nominated
2015	Nippon Connection Japanese Film Festival	Best Film	Takashi Yamazaki	Nominated

== Sequel ==
A sequel, Parasyte: Part 2, was released in Japan on April 25, 2015.
