= Shota Sometani =

Japanese actor

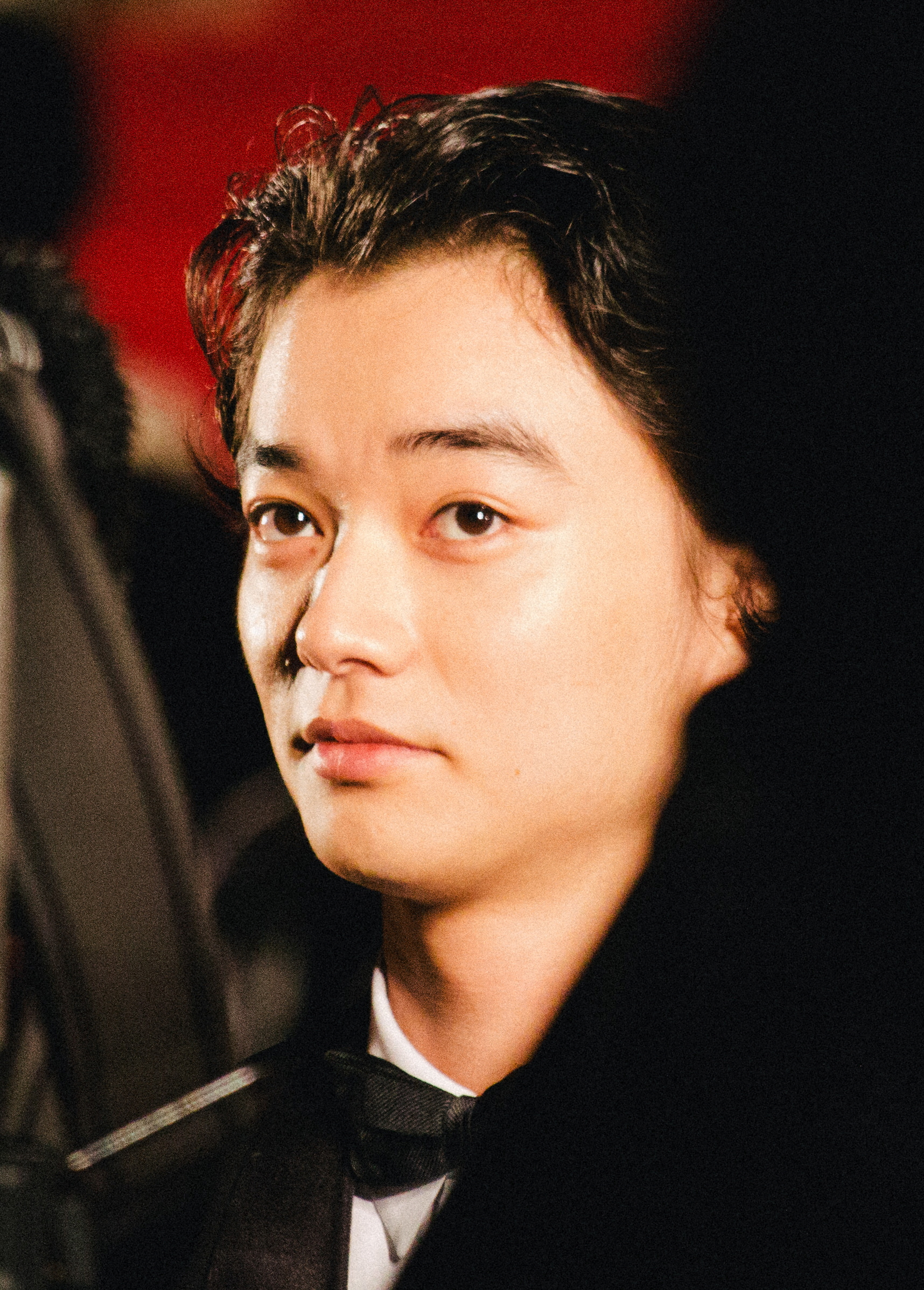
- At the 2014 Tokyo International Film Festival
- Born: 染谷 将太; September 3, 1992 (age 34); Tokyo, Japan
- Occupation: Actor
- Years active: 2001–present
- Known for: Himizu
- Spouse: Rinko Kikuchi (m. 2014)
- Children: 2

Shota Sometani (染谷 将太, Sometani Shōta) is a Japanese actor from Koto, Tokyo. He is known for his protagonist roles in Himizu and Parasyte.

== Career ==
Sometani was a child actor. He has worked in both film and television, gaining his first leading role in Pandora's Box, a 2009 film adaptation of an Osamu Dazai novel.

In 2011, he received the Marcello Mastroianni Award for Best New Young Actor at the Venice Film Festival for his work in Himizu along with his co-star Fumi Nikaidō.

He appeared in Shinji Aoyama's 2011 film Tokyo Park, Koji Wakamatsu's 2012 film The Millennial Rapture, and starred in Gakuryu Ishii's 2012 film Isn't Anyone Alive?

== Personal life ==
Sometani married actress Rinko Kikuchi on December 31, 2014. In October 2016, Kikuchi gave birth to their first child. Their second child was born in late 2018.

== Filmography ==
=== Film ===
Year	Title	Role	Notes	Ref.
2002	Ping Pong			
2003	Hebi Ichigo	Masuda		
2004	The Boy from Hell			
2004	Devilman	Susumu		
2008	Namida Tsubo	Young Yūsuke		
2008	Fure Fure Shojo			
2009	Pandora's Box		Lead role	
2010	Yuriko's Aroma		Lead role	
2010	Tokyo Island			
2010	Awaremi Mumashika			
2011	Tokyo Park	Hiro Takai		
2011	Usotsuki Mii-kun to Kowareta Maa-chan		Lead role	
2011	Azemichi no Dandy			
2011	Antoki no Inochi	Nobuo Yamaki		
2012	Isn't Anyone Alive?	Keisuke	Lead role	
2012	Himizu	Yuichi Sumida	Lead role	
2012	Sadako 3D			
2012	Sue, Mai & Sawa: Righting the Girl Ship	Kosuke Chiba		
2012	Lesson of the Evil	Keisuke Hayami		
2012	Tenchi: The Samurai Astronomer	Tokugawa Ietsuna		
2012	The Millennial Rapture			
2012	Wolf Children	Tanabe (voice)		
2013	Strawberry Night			
2013	The Intermission		Lead role	
2013	Real	Shingo Takagi		
2013	The Eternal Zero	Kenichiro Ōishi (young)		
2013	The Kiyosu Conference	Mori Ranmaru		
2014	Wood Job!	Yuki Hirano	Lead role	
2014	The Snow White Murder Case	Hasegawa		
2014	Kabukicho Love Hotel	Toru Takahashi		
2014	Tears of Grapes	Roku	Lead role	
2014	Parasyte: Part 1	Shinichi Izumi	Lead role	
2014	As the Gods Will	Satake		
2014	Tokyo Tribe	MC Show		
2015	Parasyte: Part 2	Shinichi Izumi	Lead role	
2015	The Virgin Psychics	Yoshiro Kamogawa	Lead role	
2015	Teacher and Stray Cat	Shōgo		
2015	Strayer's Chronicle	Manabu		
2015	That's It	Samao Daikoku	Lead role	
2015	Dear Deer	Takashi		
2015	Bakuman	Eiji Nizuma		
2015	The Boy and the Beast	Teen Kyuta (voice)		
2016	The Actor	Yokota		
2016	Fueled: The Man They Called Pirate	Yoshio Hasebe		
2016	Satoshi: A Move for Tomorrow	Egawa		
2016	Live for Today: Genichiro Tenryu	Narrator		
2017	Parks	Tokio		
2017	March Comes In like a Lion	Harunobu Nikaidō		
2017	March Goes Out like a Lamb	Harunobu Nikaidō		
2017	Dawn Wind in My Poncho	Nakata		
2017	Foreboding	Tatsuo Yamagiwa	Lead role	
2018	Legend of the Demon Cat	Kūkai	Lead role, Chinese film	
2018	And Your Bird Can Sing	Shizuo	Lead role	
2018	The Miracle of Crybaby Shottan	Murata		
2018	Punk Samurai Slash Down	Magobei		
2019	Parallel World Love Story	Tomohiko Miwa		
2019	Samurai Marathon	Uesugi Hironoshin		
2019	To the Ends of the Earth	Yoshioka		
2019	The First Supper	Rintarō	Lead role	
2020	Stare	Hideaki Watanabe		
2020	First Love	Kase		
2020	Runway	Akechi		
2021	Detective Chinatown 3	Akira Murata	Chinese film	
2021	Belle	Shinjirō "Kamishin" Chikami (voice)		
2022	What to Do with the Dead Kaiju?	Denki Mukogawa		
2022	Suzume	Minoru Okabe (voice)		
2023	Fly On	Kimura		
2023	Lumberjack the Monster	Kurō Sugitani		
2024	The Yin Yang Master Zero	Minamoto no Hiromasa		
2024	Worlds Apart	Kazunari Tōno		
2024	Sana: Let Me Hear	Yūma		
2024	The Young Strangers	Yamato		
2024	Saint Young Men: The Movie	Buddha	Lead role	
2024	Who's Gone	Shimazaki		
2024	Doctor-X: The Movie	Hiroto Kōzu / Takato Kōzu		
2024	Cells at Work!	Helper T Cell		
2025	BAUS: The Ship's Voyage Continues	Saneo	Lead role	
2025	Suzuki=Bakudan	Todoroki		
2025	100 Meters	Komiya (voice)	Lead role	
2025	Purehearted	Goro Gotoda		
2025	Beethoven Fabrication	Alexander Wheelock Thayer		
2025	Scarlet	Guildenstern (voice)		
2025	New Interpretation of the End of Edo Period	Miyoshi Shinzō		
2026	Kyojo: Reunion	Kenji Nakagome		
2026	The A-Care: Disusebody	Tadasu Urushihara	Lead role	
2026	AnyMart		Lead role	
2026	Sana: Play with Me			
2027	Border	Hiroyuki Ninomiya	Lead role	

=== Television drama ===
Year	Title	Role	Notes	Ref.
2009	Clouds Over the Hill	Akiyama Yoshifuru (young)		
2010	Ryōmaden	Yamauchi Toyonori	Taiga drama	
2011	Gō	Mori Bōmaru	Taiga drama	
2012	Crime and Punishment: A Falsified Romance	Haruka Mikoshiba		
2013	xxxHolic	Kimihiro Watanuki		
2013	Neo Ultra Q	Kōichi		
2013	Minna! ESPer Dayo!	Yoshirō Kamogawa	Lead role	
2016	Hibana: Spark	Ogata		
2017	Foreboding	Tatsuo Yamagiwa	Lead role	
2019	Natsuzora: Natsu's Sky	Kōya Kamiji	Asadora	
2020–21	Awaiting Kirin	Oda Nobunaga	Taiga drama	
2021	Bullets, Bones and Blocked Noses	Michael	Miniseries	
2022	Teen Regime	Teru Washida	Miniseries	
2023	Kazama Kimichika: Kyojo Zero	Kenji Nakagome		
2023	Sanctuary	Shimizu		
2024	Tokyo Swindlers			
2025	Unbound	Kitagawa Utamaro	Taiga drama	
2025	Last Samurai Standing	Kocha Kamuy		
2026	Blossom	Ichiro Nishio	Asadora	
2026	Tagusari Bros.	Minoru Tagusari		

=== Other television ===
Year	Title	Role	Notes	Ref.
2020	71st NHK Kōhaku Uta Gassen	Judge		

== Awards and nominations ==
Year	Award	Category	Result	Ref.
2011	68th Venice International Film Festival	Marcello Mastroianni Award	Won	
2013	37th Elan d'or Awards	Newcomers of the Year	Won	
2013	36th Japan Academy Film Prize	Newcomers of the Year	Won	
2015	14th New York Asian Film Festival	Rising Star Award	Won	
2016	39th Japan Academy Film Prize	Best Supporting Actor	Nominated	
2016	25th Japan Film Professional Awards	Best Actor	Won	
2018	31st Nikkan Sports Film Awards	Best Supporting Actor	Nominated	
2019	73rd Mainichi Film Awards	Best Supporting Actor	Nominated	
2019	28th Tokyo Sports Film Awards	Best Supporting Actor	Nominated	
2021	24th Nikkan Sports Drama Grand Prix	Best Supporting Actor	Won	
