= The Willard =

Japanese punk band

The Willard (stylized as THE WILLARD) is a Japanese punk band that started in 1982 and continues to play to this day. The Willard were known for their "popish" songs fused with punk, but has since changed their sound over the years, from punk to goth to indie.

== Band members ==
Original lineup

- Jun – vocals
- You – guitar
- Klan – bass
- Kyoya – drums

Changes

- Jun was briefly in The Stalin as guitarist in 1984, he went by the name June-Bleed.
- You was later replaced by Shin, and Shin was later replaced by Kagawa from Dead End.
- Klan was temporarily replaced by Anai but came back to do Take the Horror Train and has stayed til this day.
- Kyoya left and is now in Laughin Nose.
- You left too, making Jun the guitarist and vocalist.
- Ex-guitarist Shin died in 2010.

Current line-up

- Jun – vocals, guitar
- Klan – bass
- Ohshima – drums

== Discography ==
- 1) Good Evening Wonderful Fiend (Captain Records, 1985 release, 1989 CD conversion, 1998 picture CD conversion)
- 2) Will (J.A.P Records, 1986 release, 1989 CD conversion)
- 3) Who Songs a Gloria? (Toshiba EMI, 1986 release)
- 4) Indies (The Crown Record, 1987 release)
- 5) The Legend of Silver Guns (Toshiba EMI, 1987 release)
- 6) Mercy for the Rabbit (Toshiba EMI, 1988 release)
- 7) The Town in Destiny (Toshiba EMI, 1988 release)
- 8) Gone With the Wind (Toshiba EMI, in 1989 release, the LP board was 2 groups)
- 9) The Willard ([Koromubia] Triad (1990 release)
- 10) Rebtile House ([Koromubia] Seven Gods, 1991 release)
- 11' Lucifer Lives -Foggy Midnight Session- (Nightshade Records, 1992 release)
- 12) Funny Fears ([Koromubia] Triad, 1993 release)
- 13' Hell Bound Express Live' ([Koromubia] Triad, 1994 release)
- 15) Bishop on the Needle ([Koromubia] Triad, 1994 release)
- 16) Take the Horror Train ([Koromubia] Triad, 1996 release)
- 17) Rubbish Stories Happened (Toshiba EMI, 1997 release)
- 18) Tallyho (King Record, 1997 release)
- 19) Boogie With the Wizard ~ A Tribute to Marc Bolan & T.Rex ([Teichiku], 1997 release, covering the song "20th Century Boy")
- 20) Prank Ster a Go Go (King Record, 1998 release)
- 23) Tangerine Sky and Tiny Daisy Chain-Flying Ace (2006 release)
- 22) My Sweet Journey-Flying Ace (2006 release)
- 22) Sweet Bad Journey-Flying Ace (2006 release)
