= Cobra (Japanese band) =

Japanese punk/Oi! band

- Origin: Osaka, Japan
- Genres: Punk rock, Oi!
- Years active: 1982–1991, 1999–2005, 2007–present
- Labels: AA, Tokuma Japan, Pony Canyon, Public Red, EMI, Measure, Worst Music, Office Cobra, Bootstomp, Chaos & Anarchy
- Members: Yosu-ko; Lina; Yuichi; Ki-yan
- Past members: Mi-chan; Larry; Happy; Makochan; Pon; Naoki; Yoshiro; Kiego; Ryu
- Website: Official website

Cobra (stylized as COBRA) is a Japanese punk/Oi! band from Osaka. They were one of the first bands in Japan to incorporate the style of Oi! in their sound. They have cited as their influences early British Oi! bands such as Cockney Rejects and Business.

== History ==
The original incarnation of the band was formed in 1982 by two friends who had first met in their junior high school's folk music club: Yosu-ko (on vocals and bass guitar) and Naoki (on guitar), and a mutual friend known as Mi-chan on drums. Their first recording was the EP Break Out, released from the independent label AA Records in 1984. Naoki left that same year.

Cobra released several singles and EPs on AA Records, some of which were later collected on a CD entitled Indie Omnibus '82-'86. The band's debut LP, Stand the Pressure (1985) was also released on AA Records, and featured an eye-catching cover of a boot crushing a young man's face. The band went through several member changes.

Then in 1989, Yosu-ko happened to meet Naoki and bassist Pon, who at the time were both members of the punk band Laughin' Nose but thinking of leaving. They joined Yosu-ko, and drummer Ki-yan completed this line-up. They were signed by a major record label, Pony Canyon, and released two full-length albums (Oi Oi Oi and Captain Nippon, both 1990) and a half-length album (Stand! Strong! Straight!, 1991). Although this incarnation of Cobra was quite commercially successful (e.g. playing at Budokan in January 1991), it disbanded in December 1991 after only a year. Yosu-ko and Pon pursued their interest in house music under the moniker Cow Cow, while Naoki, his younger brother Taisho, and Ki-yan formed a rock band called Dog Fight, with Ken (currently of SA) on bass guitar.

Cobra reformed in 1999 and released a new album, simply entitled Cobra. Yosu-ko and Naoki were the only members to return from the previous lineup; Yosu-ko handled the bass duties as well as vocals, and the two were joined by drummer Yoshiro. This album represented a departure in the band's sound compared to their 1980s/early 1990s work, with generally quieter guitars, less of an emphasis on sing-along choruses, and more of an overall alternative rock feel.

Another album with the same lineup, OK Ride On, was released later that year on EMI Records, and marked something of a return to form for the band. After Voice, Naoki left Cobra to become the guitarist for the punk band SA. Yoshiro departed as well, so Yosu-ko recruited drummer Keigo (formerly The Stalin and The Star Club) and a rotating number of support musicians for the next album, On The Street (2002), which consisted largely of re-recorded versions of old Cobra songs and a cover of the Clash classic "White Riot". Reduced to a two-piece, Cobra recorded their following album, Reality Check (2003), in Los Angeles. In 2005, Cobra seemed to dissolve once again.

However, Yosu-ko revived the band in 2007 with Yuichi on bass, Ryu on drums and Lina on guitar, and released Hello! This is Cobra in 2009. Ryu left in 2010, and was replaced by the return of Ki-yan the following year.

== Discography ==
=== Studio albums ===
- Stand the Pressure (1985.11.21) Oricon Albums Chart Peak Position: No. 56 (1991 reissue)
- Oi Oi Oi (1990.5.5) No. 9
- Captain Nippon (1990.10.10) No. 6
- Stand! Strong! Straight! (1991.5.5) No. 22
- Cobra (1999.3.20)
- O.K. Ride On (1999.10.20) No. 98
- Voice (2001.6.27)
- Reality Check (2003.7.30)
- Rock'N'Roll Homicide (2008.4.20)
- Hello! This is Cobra (2009.4.39)
- The Greatest Fuckin' Cobra (2010.10.10)
- Boycott (2012.3.3)

=== Singles/EPs ===
- "Break Out" (1984)
- "1984" (1984)
- "Bad Night X'Mas" (1985)
- "Wrong Way" (1986)
- "Stranger" (1986)
- "Strangers" (1987)
- "Oretachi" (1990.9.5) Oricon Singles Chart Peak Position: No. 25
- "Boots Boy" (1991.11.21) No. 74
- "Love & Works" (2008)
- "Sing Along Together" (2008.12.20)

=== Other albums ===
- Cobra Indie Omnibus '82-'82 (1991.12.15, best of album)
- Best of Cobra (1996.2.21, best of album)
- Cobra On the Street (2002.9.12)
- Live Innocent (2004.1.10, live album)
- "Mission-X!!" Split w/The Ryders (2004.7.21)
- Cobra is Back (2009.10.10, self-cover album)
- "Punk 2 Stupid!" Split w/The Ryders (2010.2.22)
- Cobra is Alive 20th Anniversary Best (2010.4.21, best of album)
- Tribute to Cobra Oi Oi Oi (2010.11.10, tribute album)
- The Greatest Fuckin' XMas (2011.3.10, live album)

=== DVDs ===
- Captain Nippon Budokan (2008)
- Cobra Kodo '82-'91 (2008)
