= Maiko Haaaan!!! =

- Film poster
- Directed by: Nobuo Mizuta
- Written by: Kankurō Kudō
- Starring: Sadao Abe; Shinichi Tsutsumi; Kou Shibasaki; Kotomi Kyono
- Cinematography: Osamu Fujiishi
- Music by: Tarō Iwashiro
- Distributed by: Toho
- Release date: June 16, 2007 (Japan)
- Running time: 120 minutes
- Country: Japan
- Language: Japanese

Maiko Haaaan!!! (Japanese: 舞妓 Haaaan!!!) is a Japanese comedy film directed by Nobuo Mizuta and released in 2007. Hitoshi Ueki made his final film appearance in this project.

== Plot ==
Kimihiko Onizuka (Sadao Abe) is a salaryman infatuated with maiko (apprentice geisha) and whose greatest goal in life is to play a party game called yakyuken with one. Upon being transferred to his company's Kyoto branch, he dumps his coworker girlfriend Fujiko (Kou Shibasaki) and makes his first ever visit to a geisha house. However, when the realization of Kimihiko's lifelong dream is rudely interrupted by a professional baseball star named Kiichiro Naito (Shinichi Tsutsumi), he vows revenge by becoming a pro baseball player himself. Meanwhile, Fujiko decides to become an apprentice geisha. A rivalry between Kimihiko and Naito ensues in which they try to out-do each other at baseball, K-1, cooking, acting and even politics.

== Cast ==
- Sadao Abe as Kimihiko Onizuka
- Shinichi Tsutsumi as Kiichiro Naito
- Kou Shibasaki as Fujiko Osawa
- Kotomi Kyono as Koume
- Hitoshi Ueki as Saito
