= SA (Samurai Attack) =

Japanese punk rock band

- Also known as: Samurai Attack
- Origin: Gifu, Japan
- Genres: Punk rock, Oi! punk
- Years active: 1984–1987, 1999–present
- Labels: Pineapple, Anagram (UK)
- Members: Taisei; Naoki; Ken; Shohei
- Website: http://sa-web.jp

SA (also known outside Japan as Samurai Attack) is a Japanese punk rock band. Their style of music has been described (in the liner notes of their own releases) as Oi! punk.

== History ==
SA was originally formed by vocalist Taisei Mabuchi in Gifu Prefecture in 1984. Their first release was the five-song EP I Get Position (1985) from the independent label Club the Star. This limited-run (2000 copies) release quickly sold out, and the punk rock magazine Doll placed it at the top of its list of "brightest-hope domestic releases of 1985." They also contributed two tracks to the album Oi of Japan (1986), which was compiled by Yosu-ko of Cobra and released from the independent AA Records (founded by the punk band Laughin' Nose). In 1987, having decided to move to Tokyo, Taisei brought SA to an end, with their last show (in Nagoya) breaking the attendance record for the venue. In Tokyo, Taisei formed a band called Bad Messiah, which released four albums and 10 singles from Epic Sony before dissolving in 1996.

SA was reunited in 1999, and in 2000 released the album You Must Stand Up My Comrades, consisting of remastered versions of the tracks on I Get Position and newly recorded songs. At the reunited SA's first show, Taisei met guitarist Naoki from Cobra, which was appearing as a guest. When eventually asked by Taisei to join SA, Naoki agreed on the condition that the rest of the band's lineup also be changed. This led to the current lineup of the band, including bassist Ken (who had played with Naoki in the band Dog Fight) and drummer Shohei (who had once auditioned for Cobra).

The first album with this new lineup was Great Operation, self-released on the band's own label, Pineapple Records, in July 2002. This album led off with what would become the band's signature song, the hyper-energetic "Don't Deny, Give It A Try!!"; other notable tracks included "Die With Honor," "Drawing Your Flag," and "For Who, For What." A CD single, Who's The Next Upstart?, was released later the same year, which aside from the title track featured a cover of the classic Sham 69 song "Borstal Breakout" as well as an extended-electronica remix of "Don't Deny, Give It A Try!!". A mini-LP entitled Stiff Upper Lip was released in March 2003, followed by the band's third full-length, Matchless Attack, in June 2004. Later that same year, the British label Anagram Records licensed a selection of songs from all of the band's Pineapple Records releases to date and compiled them onto a 20-track CD, entitled simply S.A. "Samurai Attack!". This was the first (and, as of mid-2009, only) of the band's recordings to be distributed widely outside Japan.

A fourth full-length LP, Primal Yell, was released in 2006. In 2007, SA opened up for the platinum-selling American punk band Rancid during their tour of Japan. A mini-LP, Beyond I, was released on Pineapple in 2007, followed by another full-length album, Vandals Bop, in 2008. SA joined several other Japanese artists and bands for the 2009 edition of the Japan Nite tour (dubbed the "Attack From Japan" tour by SA), which started at the SXSW music festival in Austin and visited seven other major cities throughout the United States. A documentary about this tour, which originally aired on a satellite TV channel in Japan, was later released in expanded form as the DVD Make More Noize. SA opened for Rancid again during a portion of their Japan tour in fall 2009. Austin-based punk band Lower Class Brats opened for them during their Revolt'n' Roll Tour of February 2010.

SA's music, though clearly rooted in Oi! and late-70's/early-80's punk rock, is characterized by often-breakneck tempos that are often fast enough to be considered hardcore, as well as a musical adventurousness that is rather unusual for the genre; abrupt timing changes are quite frequent, several of their songs have utilized instruments such as horns, accordions, and banjos, and they have even recorded a few ballads. As is typical for Japanese rock artists outside of the pop genre, SA's songs typically mix both Japanese- and English-language lyrics, often with partly Japanese verses and primarily or entirely English choruses.

The artwork of the band's releases is notable both for its garishness and for its frequent use of fascistic imagery—particularly on the cover of Matchless Attack, which appears to depict a Nuremberg-style rally with the four members of the band as its focal point. The band's logo is quite similar, though not identical, to the official logo of Nazi Germany's Sturmabteilung (commonly abbreviated to "SA"), the paramilitary organization that helped to put Hitler's Third Reich into power and that was later purged by Hitler in the Night of the Long Knives. (In the FAQ section of the band's former official website, Taisei stated that when he came up with the name "SA" he did not intend for it to stand for anything in particular, and that he was not aware of the association between the name and Nazi Germany.) However, a fascistic outlook is not at all evident in the lyrics of SA. These are characterized by a pro-action, pro-unity, positivist outlook not unlike that espoused by American hardcore bands such as Minor Threat or 7 Seconds. Here's an example from "Don't Deny, Give It A Try!!":

(second verse) "We've been seeing the 'depths of misery'/We already know what 'hurt' is/The time we spend was not wasted./That's is all, I can say now! (chorus) Steppin' out! (x2) /I don't want to stay such a limited place./No fight! It's rule!/Why don't you go out with us?/Don't deny, give it a try! (x2)

== Discography ==
=== Albums ===
You Must Stand Up My Comrades (Music Mine, 2000)
Great Operation (Pineapple, 2002)
Stiff Upper Lip (Pineapple, 2003)
Matchless Attack! (Pineapple, 2004)
Primal Yell (Pineapple, 2005)
Beyond I (Pineapple, 2007)
Vandals Bop (Pineapple, 2008)
Revolt'n'Roll (Pineapple, 2010)

=== EPs ===
Who's The Next Upstart? (Pineapple, 2002)

=== Best-of collections ===
S.A. "Samurai Attack!" (Anagram, 2004)
21 Songs Album Attack From Japan (exclusive CD from Japan Nite 2009 tour)

=== Compilation albums ===
Oi of Japan (AA Records, 1986)
The Blue Hearts 2002 Tribute (Universal Music, 2002)
BPR 5000-Burst Tracks (Warner Music Japan, 2003)
Smellz Like . . . (Universal Music, 2003)
The Blue Hearts Tribute 2005 Edition (Universal J, 2005)
The Mods Tribute So What!! Vol.2 (Sony, 2006)
Japan Nite Sound Sampler 2009 (exclusive CD from Japan Nite 2009 tour) (SXSW Music ASIA, 2009)

=== DVDs ===
Walls and Red Lights (Pineapple, 2004)
The Specter On My Trail (Pineapple, 2006)
An Original Film Callin' You (Pineapple, 2008)
Make More Noize (Pineapple, 2009)
