= List of Parasyte characters =

This is a list of characters for the manga and anime series Parasyte and live-action Korean series Parasyte: The Grey.

== Main characters ==
Shinichi Izumi (泉 新一, Izumi Shin'ichi)
Voiced by: Nobunaga Shimazaki (Japanese); Adam Gibbs (English)
He is a high school teenage boy whose hand is infected with a Parasite and is repeatedly put into difficult positions. Shinichi must find a way to peacefully coexist with Migi, the Parasite which has taken over his hand, and reconcile his desire to protect humanity from the Parasites with his desire to keep his own Parasite a secret in order to avoid being killed or used as a laboratory specimen. Like a superhero with a secret identity, he must also find a way to explain away his Parasite-fighting activities, as well as the stress and grief they cause him, to his friends and family. While originally forced to have Migi fight for him, Shinichi later gains heightened abilities when Migi's cells spread through his body, and fights his own battles, with the two having an advantage in both being able to act independently and work as a team. Shinichi's retention of his humanity, despite gradually becoming emotionally distant as a side-effect of Migi's cells, makes most of the other Parasites deem him a threat. After defeating Goto, with Migi deciding to "go to sleep" indefinitely afterward, Shinichi returns to Satomi and attempts to live a normal life again while having an understanding of natural order from his experience.
Sometime later, Shinichi goes to South Korea and offers to help Jun-Kyung and Team Grey get rid of the parasites.
Masanori Harada, a 20-year-old student, wrote to the editor of Monthly Afternoon magazine noting that Shinichi acts calm when he is threatened and that he is "not human anymore!" Iwaaki responded, stating that Shinichi is accustomed to "close calls" partly because Migi calms Shinichi down during battle. The statement and response were printed in the April 1993 issue of Monthly Afternoon.
Shinichi is played by Shota Sometani in the film while Masaki Suda portrays Shinichi in the Korean series Parasyte: The Grey.
Migi (ミギー, Migī; also called "Righty")
Voiced by: Aya Hirano (voice), Rinka (sound effect) (Japanese); Brittney Karbowski (English)
Migi is the Parasite which lives in Shinichi's right hand, named after the Japanese word for "right" (右, migi). Unlike "successful" Parasites, Migi has no desire to kill humans for sustenance, and is nourished by the food Shinichi eats, however he suffers from fatigue and regularly falls asleep for four hours at a time, leaving Shinichi vulnerable. Migi is, like other Parasites, completely without emotion. His primary consideration is survival (and learning about the world), and he has threatened (and in some cases attempted) to kill other humans who pose a threat to his and Shinichi's secrecy. When he and Shinichi were first coming to terms, he even threatened to remove Shinichi's other limbs in order to render him unable to place the two of them in danger. Migi can be reasoned with, however, and has just as much reason to be mistrustful of other Parasites as does Shinichi. On the other hand, unlike Shinichi, Migi has no inclination to place himself at risk in order to protect other humans from Parasites. But Migi gradually evolves over the course of the series, he becomes more human while able to temporarily separate from Shinichi's body. After the final battle with Goto, having been absorbed by the Parasite prior to his defeat, Migi's composition is greatly altered to the point that enters a deep sleep, but not before expressing that he was glad to have met Shinichi and not having taken over his body when they first met. Migi briefly woke up to save Satomi from falling to her death without Shinichi's realization.
Iwaaki explained that while Migi appears to be Shinichi's weapon, in fact Migi is in control of the battle and orders around Shinichi. Iwaaki explained that Migi is easily able to order Shinichi since Shinichi is young and "needs guidance", while Migi would find difficulty if he became a part of a politician or a president of a company since in that scenario Migi and his host would argue a lot.
An 18-year-old from Saitama Prefecture named "Midari" asked in the letters to the editor that if Migi took Shinichi's left hand, if he would have been named "Hidari". Iwaaki answered that it would be Hidari, but Iwaaki felt that the name would be similar to those of Bokuzen Hidari or Tenpei Hidari and the name would "bring to mind a doddering old man, so that wouldn't have been a good idea". Iwaaki then said that the first man to climb Mount Everest "had a name an awful lot like that..."
Migi is voiced by Sadao Abe in the film.

Jeong Su-in / Heidi (정수인)

Portrayed by: Jeon So-nee
a parasite victim with a traumatic past and when it fails to take over her brain, she enters a bizarre coexistence with it, unlike other parasites.

== Humans ==
Satomi Murano (村野 里美, Murano Satomi)
Voiced by: Kana Hanazawa (Japanese); Luci Christian (English)
Shinichi's best friend from high school, before Migi entered his life. She is a joyful yet perceptive teenage girl who cares deeply for her friends. While Satomi and Shinichi are mutually attracted towards one another, their relationship is strained to the breaking point when Shinichi's life is thrown into turmoil by the Parasites.
Satomi does not know about Migi's existence, but senses something has happened to Shinichi who grows increasingly cold and withdrawn after the death of his mother. Despite her best efforts to find out the reason behind Shinichi's behavior, he refuses to share his secrets with her in order to shield her from Migi and the Parasite threat. Consequently Satomi becomes estranged from him as she increasingly resigns herself to the belief that the kind boy she fell in love with no longer exists. Ultimately, her faith in Shinichi is restored upon witnessing him weeping freely while protectively cradling Reiko Tamura's orphaned baby in his arms. At the end of the series, she was captured by the serial killer Uragami, who confronts her with Shinichi's secrets. Upon learning that Shinichi is part Parasite, Satomi firmly proclaims that this does nothing to diminish his humanity because he still regards all life as precious.
In the manga, Satomi had a light brown short hair and was dressed in a sailor school uniforms, but in the anime, she has a changed appearance, especially a new maroon-colored hairstyle clipped up by a green hair clip that exposes her forehead, but no longer uses them in the last episode.
Satomi is played by Ai Hashimoto in the film.
Kana Kimishima (君嶋 加奈, Kimishima Kana)
Voiced by: Miyuki Sawashiro (Japanese); Maggie Flecknoe (English)
Kana is a disobedient "bad girl" who was seen hanging out with Mitsuo but develops a crush on Shinichi. She is attracted to him because of his sensitive personality because she can sense something "different" about him. In reality, Kana has the inexplicable psychic ability to sense other Parasites. However, her senses are not as fine tuned as those of the Parasite themselves. Kana mistakes this sense as a psychic connection to Shinichi, believing it was fate leading her to her "true love". This ability eventually leads to her death when she is told about the Parasite, but stubbornly refuses to believe the truth until she comes face to face with a Parasite that kills her just before Shinichi came to save her.
In the manga, Kana was depicted as a classic sukeban who does smoking, but she has a changed appearance in the anime where she was seen wearing a pair of earmuffs.
Yuko Tachikawa (立川 裕子, Tachikawa Yūko)
Voiced by: Kiyono Yasuno (Japanese); Terri Doty (English)
One of the students from Shinichi's school. Her brother works as a criminal profiling illustrator for the police department. Due to seeing his sketches of the Parasites and discovering Shimada's sinister secrets, she was caught in the center of a dangerous situation.
Unlike her anime counterpart who got more screentime, Yuko's manga counterpart had no close relationships with Shinichi or Satomi and never had any feelings for Shimada.
Akiho Suzuki (鈴木 アキホ, Suzuki Akiho)
Voiced by: Rena Maeda (Japanese); Hilary Haag (English)
A high school teenage girl who is usually seen hanging out with Murano and Yuko. Akiho only shows up in the anime and never appeared in the manga.
Taku Furuya (古屋拓, Furuya Taku)
Voiced by: Junya Enoki (Japanese); Cameron Bautsch (English)
Like Akiho, he is another character who is one of Shinichi's classmates and only shows up in the anime,
Uragami (浦上)
Voiced by: Hiroyuki Yoshino (Japanese); Andrew Love (English)
A cannibalistic serial killer who has the ability to distinguish between humans and Parasites, believing himself to be the definition of human nature and able to point out a killer. He is brought in by the military to help them in their operation to exterminate the Parasites in East Fukuyama City, but escapes when the military unit is slaughtered by Goto. He returns at the end of the series, taking Satomi hostage to confront Shinichi to see if he has the same world views as he does.
Uragami is played by Hirofumi Arai in the film.
Kazuyuki Izumi (泉 一之, Izumi Kazuyuki)
Voiced by: Masaki Aizawa (Japanese); Rob Mungle (English)
Kazuyuki is Shinichi's father. Shortly after his wife was killed by a Parasite, he had some suspicions as to whether or not Shinichi was infected, although he never said so outright.
Nobuko Izumi (泉 信子, Izumi Nobuko)
Voiced by: Chieko Sasai (Japanese); Allison Sumrall (English)
Nobuko is Shinichi's mother, expressing concern over her son's strange behavior. She dies early on when she is decapitated by a Parasite that needed a compatible body to transfer to when her male replacement body started to reject her. As the Parasite assumed Nobuko's appearance, Shinichi let himself open and got himself nearly killed in their initial encounter. But Shinichi later manages to avenge his mother's death and kills the Parasite with Uda's help.
Nobuko is played by Kimiko Yo in the film.
Kazuki Nagai (長井 和輝, Nagai Kazuki)
Voiced by: Shinya Hamazoe (Japanese); Houston Hayes (English)
One of Shinichi's classmates from his school. He had a crush on Murano and was jealous of Shinichi, so he ended up beating him up outside the gym. After Nagai was beaten by Mitsuo and his gang, Shinichi stood up for his classmate, so he changed his attitude towards him. In return, Nagai, along with his friends, attacked Mitsuo and his friends after they harassed Shinichi. In the anime, he also confronted Hideo Shimada if he has done something wrong to Shinichi.
Unlike his anime counterpart, Nagai never had a crush on Murano or disliked Shinichi in the manga. In the scene after gym class, the person who attacked Shinichi was a minor character named Kotani who only shows up in the manga. Due to being omitted from the anime adaptation, his feelings for Murano and jealousy of Shinichi were transferred to Nagai.
Sumie Kawai (川井澄江, Kawai Sumie)
A housekeeper hired by Shinichi's father. She never shows up in the anime, although Shinichi did suggest to his father if they can hire a housekeeper.
Kamijou (上条)
Voiced by: Yuya Murakami (Japanese); Jack Ivy (English)
One of Shinichi's close friends from his school. In the manga, Kamijou was usually seen hanging out with Shinichi, often teasing him for his relationship with Satomi and went to his rescue when Shinichi was being attacked by Mitsuo and his group.
Mitsuo (光夫)
Voiced by: KENN (Japanese); Scott Gibbs (English)
A student from Kana's school and also her boyfriend before Shinichi showed up. Mitsuo became jealous of Shinichi because of his girlfriend's crush on him. In the manga, he was depicted as a muscular teenage delinquent who is dressed in a school uniform. Mitsuo has a new appearance in the anime adaptation, portraying him as a young adult with a slimer body-figure, wearing a red jacket and a beanie on his head.
Makiko Hayase (早瀬 真樹子, Hayase Makiko)
Voiced by: Yu Serizawa (Japanese); Margaret McDonald (English)
Makiko is a young schoolgirl who lives with her parents, grandfather, and younger brother in the small town where Shinichi's father is hospitalized. Her family owns a hotel in the town where Shinichi stays for a few days in order to stay close to his father. It is shown that she develops a small crush on Shinichi during his stay in Sakurasaki.
Mamoru Uda (宇田 守, Uda Mamoru)
Voiced by: Takuma Suzuki (Japanese); Mark X. Laskowski (English)
Like Shinichi, Uda is also a human who had a Parasite merged with a part of his body other than his brain. In Uda's case, the Parasite took over the lower part of his head and face, most notably his jaw. Uda's Parasite originally does not have a name, but is later renamed Joe (ジョー, Jō; after the English word "jaw") (Voiced by: Ayumu Murase (Japanese); Greg Ayres (English)). It is brash and crude, seemingly having a sense of humor, and often assumes control of Uda's mouth, distorting it into odd shapes and forcing Uda to say strange or inappropriate things. The pair befriend Shinichi and Migi, but preferring to simply avoid Parasites. Because Uda is slightly overweight and his Parasite is located in the jaw area, fights with other Parasites tend to leave him out of breath. However, because it is located in the lower part of the head, his Parasite can extend itself downward into his chest, protecting his heart (a primary target for hostile Parasites). Uda is a peaceful, easygoing man, but is shown to be nervous under pressure and highly emotional, often crying easily. In the manga, he works as a hotel employee.
Shiro Kuramori (倉森 志郎, Kuramori Shirō)
Voiced by: Issei Futamata (Japanese); Jay Hickman (English)
A private investigator hired by Reiko to spy on Shinichi, only to be caught by Migi when he took pictures of them. When his assistant Abe goes missing, Kuramori asks Shinichi to find him and ends up recording a fight between Shinichi and a Parasite. After his family is killed by two Parasites named Hikawa and Kusano, he was in a frenzy of grief, so he kidnaps Reiko's infant son, leading to a critical confrontation at a park, only to be killed by Reiko, who ends up saving her human child.
Takeshi Hirokawa (広川 剛志, Hirokawa Takeshi)
Voiced by: Yū Mizushima (Japanese); John Gremillion (English)
The ringleader of a Parasite conspiracy to conquer humanity and the main antagonist of the latter half of the series. In order to realize his vision of culling the human race for the planet's well-being, he lends his resources and political acumen to unite the Parasites and transform the chaotic "Mincemeat Murders" into a systematic process of mass slaughter. Aside from his professed environmentalism and deep-rooted hatred of the human race, nothing is revealed about his character or background.
Mid-way through the series, Hirokawa is revealed to be working with the Parasites to overthrow human civilization. Towards this end, he and Reiko Tamura oversee the creation of an überparasite called "Goto" who has complete control over four additional parasites within his host body. He also successfully runs for mayor of East Fukuyama City, a municipality near Shinichi's hometown, and thereafter uses his power to set up safehouses where the Parasites can devour humans with impunity. After Shinichi and Migi disrupt the operation of one of these facilities, Hirokawa tasks Goto, his chief enforcer, with their elimination. Ultimately, he and most of the Parasites comprising his organization are killed by a police task force once their plans are uncovered by the authorities. Even in the aftermath of Hirokawa's demise, Goto commits himself to seeing through his late boss's order to kill Shinichi and Migi for his own closure.
Hirama (平間)
Voiced by: Takuma Suzuki (Japanese); George Manley (English)
A veteran detective who first suspected Shinichi for Kana's death.
Yamagishi (山岸)
Voiced by: Rikiya Koyama (Japanese); Josh Morrison (English)
A police officer assigned to the Parasite Extermination Squad, who is eventually beheaded by Goto.
Mitsuyo (美津代)
Voiced by: Seiko Fujiki (Japanese); Vicki Barosh (English)
An old woman with a sharp tongue, who gave shelter to Shinichi after his fight with Goto in the forest. After staying for a while, he left to have the final confrontation with Goto.

Seol Kang-woo (설강우)

Portrayed by: Koo Kyo-hwan
A small-time gangster who initially tracks down parasites in order to find his younger sister, Jin-hee, but ends up teaming with Su-in.

Choi Jun-kyung (최준경)

Portrayed by: Lee Jung-hyun
The team leader of "Grey Team", a task force that wants to eradicate parasites.

Kim Cheol-min (김철민)

Portrayed by: Kwon Hae-hyo
A senior detective at Namil Police Station, whom eventually becomes infected with a parasite.

Kang Won-seok (강원석)

Portrayed by: Kim In-kwon
Cheol-min's junior detective who also secretly teamed up with the parasites.
Seol Jin-hee
Portrayed by: Moon Ju-yeon
Kang-woo's younger sister who went missing.

== Parasites ==
The antagonists of the series. The Parasites are creatures of unknown origin which start off as worm-like creatures that instinctively enter the body of the nearest life form and travel to the brain to completely assimilate it while destroying the host's identity in the process. Thereafter, using the vital organs of the host bodies to survive, the Parasites are instinctually driven to kill all humans as well as Parasites with failed host bodies.

Upon assuming hosts, the parasites hunted humans at random with little to no coordination among each other. This led to a series of widespread mass-killings which were coined the "mincemeat murders" by the public. As their intelligence and familiarity with their environment grew, the parasites became more cautious in their feeding and eventually formed groups for safety in numbers.

After assimilating their host, Parasites exhibit a variety of abilities that make them dangerous adversaries. The immediate area around their entry site (typically the head) is morphed into a versatile "parasite tissue" which can take a variety of offensive and defensive forms. Additionally, a parasite that successfully takes over a host's brain can then maximize the physical potential of the host's body. Furthermore, though their thought process is coldly rational and almost devoid of anything resembling human emotion, many parasites display intellectual capabilities far in excess of the average human. Depending on their environment, they are capable of learning skills that would take a normal person years to develop over an extremely short period of time. Migi, for example, mastered Japanese after one night of reading books on the subject. Likewise, the überparasite, Goto, becomes a skilled pianist less than a year after taking on a host body.

Despite their strong instincts, it is possible for parasites to ignore or outgrow their desire to eat humans, and despite this apparent lack of humanity, they can instinctively recognize others of their species by the signal they all emit and regard them as allies rather than competition. Even completely inhuman parasites are willing to work together for a broad range of reasons. By the end of the series, the surviving Parasites have either gone into hiding or have largely assimilated themselves in human society.

Ryōko Tamiya (田宮 良子, Tamiya Ryōko) / Reiko Tamura (田村 玲子, Tamura Reiko)
Voiced by: Atsuko Tanaka (Japanese); Joanne Bonasso (English)
An extremely intelligent and ruthless Parasite who is one of the story's main antagonists. She originally infected and took on the identity of a woman named "Ryōko Tamiya", one of Shinichi's high school teachers, before changing her identity to "Reiko Tamura". Unlike most parasites, she is motivated by scientific inclinations with a drive to understand her kind's biology, origin, and purpose. Later on in the story, Reiko forms a secret cabal of parasites dedicated to overthrowing humanity as the planet's dominant species. While ultimately abandoning her genocidal plans against humans, her actions constitute one of the biggest sources of conflict throughout the series.
Upon encountering Shinichi and Migi, Ryōko Tamiya becomes obsessed with learning about their unique symbiotic relationship. In order to satisfy her intellectual curiosity about the two, she arranges a meeting with them to swap information regarding their species. During their conversation, Ryōko reveals she has become pregnant as part of an experiment to determine parasite hosts' reproductive capabilities. As a result of this meeting, she exposes Shinichi to her mate, Mr. A, who thereafter tries to kill him upon determining him to be a threat. After Shinichi defeats Mr. A with Migi's assistance, Ryōko (now going under the name of "Reiko Tamura") tasks another Parasite, Hideo Shimada, with monitoring them on her behalf. This ultimately leads to a brutal massacre at Shinichi's school, resulting in the slaughter of many of his schoolmates. At around the same time, Reiko gives birth to a human baby whom she begins to study.
In the latter half of the series, Reiko Tamura is revealed to be conspiring with Takeshi Harikowa, an influential politician, to unite the Parasites in a plot to bring down humanity. Towards this end, Reiko oversees the creation of an überparasite named "Goto" and helps Hirokawa set up private feeding grounds for Parasites to eat humans without drawing attention. Within the same timeframe, however, she finds herself developing feelings for her infant child and begins harboring reservations about waging war on the human race. Disturbed by this sudden change in her behavior, other Parasites in league with Hirokawa come to view her as a threat and attempt to ambush her. Reiko subsequently kills them and abandons Hirokawa's organization. In her final encounter with Shinichi, she informs him she has come to the realization that Parasites can coexist with humans if permitted to live among them. When police arrive on the scene and open fire on her, Reiko serenely accepts her fate and entrusts Shinichi with her child's safety before succumbing to her wounds.
Tamura is portrayed by Eri Fukatsu in the film.
Mr. B (B)
Voiced by: Tōru Nara (Japanese); Mike Yager (English)
A Parasite who attacks Shinichi and tries to coerce Migi into relocating to his arm in order to extend his own lifespan. To his surprise, Migi kills him on the pretense that relocation is too risky to try.
Mr. A (A, Ē)
Voiced by: Makoto Yasumura (Japanese); David Wald (English)
A highly aggressive Parasite aligned with Reiko Tamura. When first introduced, he (or rather his host body) fathers a child with Reiko as part of the latter's experiment. Described by Migi as "not one of our smart ones" and called a fool by Reiko, Mr. A is extremely impulsive and animalistic. He has little capacity for caution or forethought as evidenced when he butchers several people in the presence of witnesses without hesitation. Shinichi is forced to battle Mr. A when he attempts to hunt Shinichi down and kill him at school. Though Shinichi and Migi mortally wound him, they are forced to flee before they can kill him. Subsequently, a dying Mr. A attempts to find Reiko so he can transfer himself to her body only to be killed by the latter with a bomb before he can do so.
Hideo Shimada (島田 秀雄, Shimada Hideo)
Voiced by: Akira Ishida (Japanese); Blake Shepard (English)
A Parasite with the body of a young adult and a major antagonist. On Reiko's suggestion, he enrolls in Shinichi's high school to monitor his activities. While far more pragmatic and calculating than the animalistic Mr. A, Shimada is nonetheless one of the more violent and predatory members of his kind. He has no qualms feeding on humans or otherwise killing them if they annoy or threaten to expose him. Ultimately, his single-minded desire to preserve his cover at any cost lead him to become a direct threat to Shinichi's loved ones.
When first introduced, Hideo Shimada is asked by Reiko to monitor Shinichi. Subsequently, Shimada enrolls in Shinichi's high school and attempts to befriend him. Despite professing a desire to peacefully coexist with humanity, this is quickly proven to be a ruse after he begins targeting Kana Kinishima upon learning she can sense Parasites, feeds on a teenage girl in the city, and nearly kills a gang of delinquents who pick a fight with him. When Yuko learns of his true nature and confronts him about it, Shimada attempts to kill her only for Yuko to escape by dousing him in paint-thinner. The paint-thinner's chemicals disrupts his Parasite cells, rendering him unable to restore his human appearance. Shimada thereafter goes on a killing spree throughout the school, resulting in the deaths of many of Shinichi's schoolmates. He is ultimately killed when Shinichi (with Migi's help) enhances his right arm's strength and throws a well-aimed stone through his chest, thereby destroying his heart.
Shimada is played by Masahiro Higashide in the film, where Shinichi and Migi kills him not by throwing a stone, but piercing his chest with an arrow-like bar shot thanks to Migi, who uses his body to create a bow.
Goto (後藤, Gotō)
Voiced by: Kazuhiko Inoue (Japanese); Jason Douglas (English)
The strongest parasite in the original story and of its main antagonists. Goto is the chief enforcer and right-hand man of Takeshi Hirokawa, the ringleader of a Parasite conspiracy to conquer humanity. His host body contains 4 additional Parasites that he can unify under his control. Since most of his body mass is parasite tissue, he can achieve feats of strength and agility far in excess of normal parasites and render nearly every inch of his skin impervious to gunfire and edged weapons. The name "Gotō" is a pun as one of the kanji is synonymous with the kanji for five (五, go), a reference to how 5 Parasites inhabit his host.
Despite being one of the more intelligent members of his kind, Goto is also one of the most violent and bloodthirsty. Whereas most Parasites kill humans solely to feed or eliminate perceived threats, he often kills them purely for sport. Upon being first introduced, Goto brutally massacres a Yakuza hideout as part of an experiment to test his body's effectiveness against armed groups. When Hirokawa raises concerns about his lack of restraint, he bluntly replies that it was "good exercise." Notwithstanding his viciousness, Goto does adhere to his own peculiar code of honor as seen when he commends opponents for getting past his defenses and seeks vengeance against Shinichi for his role in his comrades' massacre at East Fukuyama City Hall. While he initially aligns himself with Takeshi Hirokawa's goals of building a Parasite-dominated utopia, he abandons such pretensions upon Hirokowa's death, concluding he exists "only to fight".
After Shinichi and Migi attack one of his organization's "dining areas", Goto is tasked by Hirokawa with eliminating them. Despite easily overwhelming the two in combat, they narrowly manage to escape. Later, when Hirokawa and his cabal are virtually wiped out in an SAT operation, Goto singlehandedly annihilates most of the attacking police forces before once again targeting Shinichi and Migi. In their ensuing rematch, Goto absorbs Migi after the latter sacrifices himself so Shinichi can retreat. Later during the story's climax, Shinichi poisons him by stabbing one of his few vulnerable areas with a pipe contaminated with toxins. As a result, Goto loses control of the other Parasites comprising his body thereby enabling Migi to break free and help Shinichi finally defeat him.
Miki (三木; lit. 'Three trees')
Voiced by: Daisuke Namikawa (Japanese); Xero Reynolds (English)
One of the Parasites that composes Goto's body. Similar to "Migi", Miki's default position in the body is the right arm. His name has an additional meaning, which means "Three trees", referencing how he is only able to manipulate 3 Parasites in the body (including himself) when he takes the head position. Unlike other Parasites, Miki has learned to show emotions just like humans. His body is composed of five Parasites, one in each of his arms and legs and another in his head, they can apparently swap their places in the body but only two of them are able to unify the five and make them fight as a single being.
Kusano (草野)
Voiced by: Takaya Aoyagi (Japanese); Kalob Martinez (English)
A Parasite that allied himself with Reiko Tamura along with two others named "Hikawa" and "Maesawa." He later grows distrustful of Reiko Tamura when she argues against the notion of killing Shinichi despite the threat he poses to them. As Kusano's doubts about Reiko increase, he attempts to assassinate her with help from Maesawa and Hikawa. But his underestimation of Reiko's abilities results in the death of himself and his conspirators.
Seol Kyung-hee
Portrayed by: Yoon Hyun-gil
Kang-woo's elder sister who is infected by a parasite.
Kwon Hyuk-joo
Portrayed by: Lee Hyun-kyun
A pastor, and the leader of the parasites in South Korea.

== Names in Tokyopop publication ==
In the Tokyopop publication, the Parasites were spelled as "Parasytes". Shinichi Izumi was renamed Shin and his hand was called "Lefty", as the image had been flipped to read left to right. Satomi Murano was renamed Sara. Jaw, Mamoru Uda's Parasite, was referred to as Jaws, in reference to the film Jaws by Steven Spielberg. Reiko Tamura was renamed Tamara Rockford.
