= Parasyte: The Grey =

2024 South Korean television series

- Promotional poster
- Hangul: 기생수: 더 그레이
- Hanja: 寄生獸: 더 그레이
- RR: Gisaengsu: deo geurei
- MR: Kisaengsu: tŏ kŭrei
- Genre: Horror; Science fiction
- Based on: Parasyte by Hitoshi Iwaaki
- Written by: Yeon Sang-ho; Ryu Yong-jae
- Directed by: Yeon Sang-ho
- Starring: Jeon So-nee; Koo Kyo-hwan; Lee Jung-hyun
- Music by: Kim Dong-wook
- Country of origin: South Korea
- Original language: Korean
- No. of episodes: 6

Production
- Producers: Byun Soong-min; Yang Yoo-min; Cho Eun-hye
- Cinematography: Byun Bong-sun
- Animator: Yoo Hyun-hee
- Editor: Han Mi-yeon
- Running time: 43–61 minutes
- Production companies: Climax Studio; Wow Point

Original release
- Network: Netflix
- Release: April 5, 2024

Parasyte: The Grey (Korean: 기생수: 더 그레이) is a 2024 South Korean science fiction horror television series directed and co-written by Yeon Sang-ho. The series is a live-action spin-off of the manga series Parasyte by the Japanese artist Hitoshi Iwaaki and depicts a confrontation with unidentified parasitic creatures that live on humans and have the urge to kill humans. It stars Jeon So-nee, Koo Kyo-hwan, and Lee Jung-hyun. It was released on Netflix on April 5, 2024, and received generally positive reviews.

== Plot ==
A group of mysterious parasitic creatures fall from outer space and begin using humans as hosts, killing them, and transforming them into unique creatures that can shapeshift their heads into anything.

The Grey Team of the police force is formed, led by Choi Jun-kyung. They protect the society from parasite attacks and keep the attacks completely off the news and social media. Jun-kyung's husband was one of the first parasites; she now keeps him as a hunting dog, captive under a mask so he can inform the team when any parasite is nearby as Parasites can sense their own kind.

Jeong Su-in is a cashier at a supermarket living a mundane life. This changes when she is stabbed by a drunk customer after work. She wakes up in the hospital with the assailant dead. Police officer Kim Chul-min, who had rescued Su-in as a child when she reported her abusive father, checks in on her. Su-in has indeed become a Parasite after the attack, as one had tried taking over her brain when she fell unconscious. She is cornered by two parasites to confirm if she is one of them. This is witnessed by Seol Kang-woo, a small time thug, whose older sister is one of the parasites; his younger sister is missing. The Parasite in Su-in, who Kang-woo names Heidi after Jekyll and Hyde, asks him to inform Su-in of her presence. Heidi could not take complete control of Su-in's body, too busy trying to heal her injured body after the stabbing; hence, she now lives in Su-in's subconscious and can only take over one side of her head and awake to protect her.

Su-in is taken by the parasites to a secluded church where a pastor parasite leads a group of parasites. Kang-woo finds his younger sister's body there. Devastated, he flees with Su-in with the Parasites in pursuit. While inspecting the site, Chul-min finds the key chain he gave to Su-in. He meets her to question her about it but is attacked by Jun-kyung who followed him. Su-in passes out and Chul-min's partner Kang Won-seok kills the hunting dog which is witnessed by Kang-woo.

Su-in is taken captive by the Grey Team despite her results being negative. Chul-min and Kang-woo team up to free her during her transfer. During the transfer, a group of Parasites attacks them and Kang-woo takes the chance and succeeds in freeing her. Chul-min is killed by the Pastor's parasite who later takes his physical form and joins Won-seok to kill all the Parasites at a location with help of the Grey Team.

Su-in informs Jun-kyung about the parasites in the team but she does not believe her initially, however after some investigation she starts suspecting that there are moles in her team. A parasite who uses Kang-woo's older sister's body wants to work together with Su-in to kill the Pastor's parasite and they agree to ambush the Pastor's plan to take over the Mayor's body during festival celebration.

At the festival, the Pastor's parasite leaves Chul-min's body and takes over Won-seok. Later, it leaves his head to get into Jun-kyung as the mayor escapes with the help of Kang-woo. Su-in manages to save her, and Jun-kyung kills Won-seok. After reinforcements arrive, Jun-kyung chooses to cover up for Su-in and tells her subordinates that Su-in is not a Parasite.

In the aftermath, Su-in and Heidi continue to co-exist with one another while Su-in stays in her job at the supermarket. Kang-woo joins the Grey Team and invites Su-in to join him. Back at the headquarters, Jun-kyung meets a self-proclaimed Parasite expert from Japan, who introduces himself as Shinichi Izumi.

== Cast and characters ==
=== Main ===
- Jeon So-nee as Jeong Su-in / Heidi

A young woman with a traumatic past who becomes a parasite victim; when it fails to take over her brain due to her stab wounds, she enters a bizarre coexistence with it, unlike other parasites.

- Koo Kyo-hwan as Seol Kang-woo

A small-time gangster who initially tracks down parasites in order to find his younger sister, but teams up with Su-in after learning of her condition.

- Lee Jung-hyun as Choi Jun-kyung

The team leader of the Grey Team, a task force that seeks to eradicate parasites.

=== Supporting ===
- Kwon Hae-hyo as Kim Chul-min

A senior detective at Namil Police Station.

- Kim In-kwon as Kang Won-seok

Cheol-min's junior detective.

- Yoon Hyun-gil as Seol Kyung-hee

Kang-woo's elder sister who is infected by a parasite.

- Lee Hyun-kyun as Kwon Hyuk-joo

A pastor, and the leader of the parasites.

- Moon Ju-yeon as Seol Jin-hee

Kang-woo's younger sister who went missing.

=== Special appearance ===
- Jeon Su-ji as Soo-in's mother
- Masaki Suda as Shinichi Izumi

The protagonist of the original Parasyte manga and anime series.

== Episodes ==
No.	Title	Directed by	Written by	Original release date
1	"Episode 1"	Yeon Sang-ho	Yeon Sang-ho & Ryu Yong-jae	April 5, 2024
2	"Episode 2"	Yeon Sang-ho	Yeon Sang-ho & Ryu Yong-jae	April 5, 2024
3	"Episode 3"	Yeon Sang-ho	Yeon Sang-ho & Ryu Yong-jae	April 5, 2024
4	"Episode 4"	Yeon Sang-ho	Yeon Sang-ho & Ryu Yong-jae	April 5, 2024
5	"Episode 5"	Yeon Sang-ho	Yeon Sang-ho & Ryu Yong-jae	April 5, 2024
6	"Episode 6"	Yeon Sang-ho	Yeon Sang-ho & Ryu Yong-jae	April 5, 2024

== Production ==
=== Development ===
The series was developed under the working title The Grey (더 그레이; Deo geurei), a collaboration between Netflix and director Yeon Sang-ho. Yeon and Ryu Yong-jae team up to direct and write the series. Climax Studio and Wow Point managed the production.

=== Casting ===
Koo Kyo-hwan and Jeon So-nee were cast to play the lead roles for the series.

Koo and Jeon together with Lee Jung-hyun were officially confirmed as the main characters for the series on August 24, 2022.

== Release ==
Parasyte: The Grey was released worldwide on Netflix with six episodes on April 5, 2024.

== Reception ==
=== Critical response ===
On the review aggregator website Rotten Tomatoes, 100% of 14 critics' reviews are positive, with an average rating of 7.6/10. Craig Mathieson of The Age wrote that "it works best as a horror tale, with the possessed humans transforming into monstrous form and back again as authorities try to stamp out the infiltration". In Ready Steady Cut, Jonathan Wilson gave a 3/5 stars and stated that "in a media climate saturated with zombies and monsters of all types, and with parasites both literal and otherwise, there was a better story to be told and a better show to be made with these same bones" and "the action and visuals do a lot of heavy lifting for Parasyte: The Grey, but the premise and themes are underexplored". Kate Sánchez rated it 9.5/10 and wrote in But Why Tho?, "as a horror series, Parasyte: The Grey is superb" and "as sci-fi, it's exciting", but "more importantly, as an adaptation, this is a showstopper". Joel Keller wrote in Decider, "Parasyte: The Grey has enough action to hold viewers' interest, but the story of Su-in's mutant existence is also what's going to keep us watching".

In Digital Mafia Talkies, Pramit Chatterjee gave a 5/5 stars and proclaimed that "Parasyte: The Grey is a great extension of Hitoshi Iwaaki's manga, while also being a relevant piece of art that comments about the times that we are living in". Pajiba's Dustin Rowles described it as "a gloriously schlocky, B-movie-esque escape from reality" and "Director Yeon Sang-ho (of Train to Busan fame) serves up six episodes of gory creature designs and fight scenes that will have you simultaneously wincing and cheering". Steven Nguyen Scaife of IGN said that "it offers weighty action and some smart departures to complement a fearsome live-action portrayal of its famous monsters, but the characterization never reaches the same heights as the original". Carla Monfort of Espinof wrote that it is "an entertaining and interesting science fiction thriller".

Singapore's national newspaper The Straits Times gave the series three out of five stars. While finding the scenes of parasitic hosts changing their heads "hilarious and cheesy", the article's writer Joanne Soh praised Jeon for her acting and called her character Su-in a "compelling protagonist" for her coherent portrayal of the character's tragic background and will to survive, as well as the switch between Su-in and her symbiotic companion Heidi. Soh also praised the chemistry between Jeon and Koo, who were both "dynamic as the pair of reluctant heroes", and Koo himself also was effective to serve as a bridge between Su-in and Heidi. The director's use of horror was also praised. Matt Cabral of Common Sense Media wrote that "the action-horror series trades the usual brain-eaters and little green men for incredibly creepy, tentacled parasites that infect and fully control human hosts". Pierce Conrad rated it a 3/5 and wrote for South China Morning Post that "this reimagining is also more interested in exploring the thematic potential of the manga's concept, rather than its fun factor" however "Yeon's message, while clearly about how humans organise themselves in society, is tricky to parse".

NME's Tanu I. Raj gave the series a three stars out of five and highlight "a more grounded approach to human nature" and "succeed in its own right". Lucy Ford of British GQ wrote that it "nestles in nicely to this landscape with its emphasis on genuine spooks and body horror squelches". For the Filipino online news website Rappler, Lé Baltar described that series' "creates drama by wielding the anxieties of its protagonist to interrogate what is human and what is not, to talk about trauma and the many ways we try to mend it".

=== Viewership ===
Parasyte: The Grey topped Netflix's Global Top 10 TV (Non-English) category three days after its release and was well received in 68 countries from April 1–7, with 31.5 million hours watched by 6.3 million viewers in its first week. The series maintained its top spot in the following week and viewership increased to 49 million hours watched by 9.8 million viewers, and it also remained on the chart for the next two consecutive weeks.

== Accolades ==
=== Awards and nominations ===
Name of the award ceremony, year presented, category, nominee of the award, and the result of the nomination
Award ceremony	Year	Category	Nominee / Work	Result	Ref.
Asia Contents Awards & Global OTT Awards	2024	Best Visual Effects	Parasyte: The Grey	Won	
Asia Contents Awards & Global OTT Awards	2024	Best Newcomer Actress	Jeon So-nee	Nominated	

=== Listicles ===
Name of publisher, year listed, name of listicle, and placement
Publisher	Year	Listicle	Placement	Ref.
Entertainment Weekly	2025	The 21 best Korean shows on Netflix to watch now	Top 21	
