= Michiro Endo =

Japanese musical artist (1950–2019)

- Born: November 15, 1950; Nihonmatsu, Fukushima, Japan
- Died: April 25, 2019 (aged 68) Tokyo, Japan
- Genres: Punk rock, hardcore punk
- Occupations: Singer-songwriter, musician, author, actor
- Instruments: Vocals, guitar, bass
- Years active: 1979–2018
- Label: King
- Formerly of: The Stalin, Notalin's, M.J.Q
- Website: apia-net.com/michiro/

Michiro Endo (Japanese: 遠藤 ミチロウ, Hepburn: Endō Michirō; November 15, 1950 – April 25, 2019) was a Japanese musician, author and socialist activist. He was best known as frontman of the influential punk rock band The Stalin. He gained notoriety for his stage antics, having once thrown a severed pig's head into the audience.

== Early life and career ==
Endo was born in Nihonmatsu, Fukushima and graduated from Yamagata University. After college he wandered through Vietnam and Southeast Asia. He formed The Stalin in 1980, they went on to be one of the dominant acts of the 80s Japanese punk rock scene.

Endo released his first solo material in 1984. In 2002 he formed the trio Notalin's. Two years later, he and Thee Michelle Gun Elephant drummer Kazuyuki Kuhara formed the acoustic trio M.J.Q, whose motto is "unplugged punk".

On December 1, 2010, two tribute albums were released. One entitled Romantist – The Stalin, Michiro Endo Tribute Album, which features bands such as Buck-Tick, Dir En Grey, Group Tamashii and Jun Togawa covering The Stalin and Endo's solo songs. The other Red Demon, Blue Demon – Michiro Endo 60th Birthday Anniversary Tribute Album, features different artists and was first released at Endo's concert on November 14 to coincide with his 60th birthday.

Endo was still active on the live scene in the 2010s, as a solo performer, playing in M.J.Q, or with the occasional The Stalin concert.

== Death ==
Michiro Endo died in a Tokyo hospital while battling pancreatic cancer on April 25, 2019, aged 68. A representative announced his death on May 1 and that he had previously undergone surgery for the cancer in October 2018.

== Discography ==
=== Singles ===
- "Aogeba Totoshi" (仰げば尊し; 1984, 1985)
- "Odyssey-1985-Sex" (オデッセイ・1985・Sex, Odessei-1985-Sex; 1985)
- "Lucky Boy" (1987)

=== Albums ===
- Betonamu Densetsu (ベトナム伝説, Vietnam Legend; 1984)
- The End (1985)
- Odyssey-1985-Sex (オデッセイ・1985・Sex, Odessei-1985-Sex; 1985)
- Ameyujyutotechitekenjya (アメユジュトテチテケンジャ, Please Take Ameyuki; 1985)
- Get the Help! (1985)
- Hasan (破産, Bankruptcy; 1986)
- Terminal (1987)
- Shime Tatarime (死目祟目, Death Eyes Curse Eyes; 1993)
- Sora ha Ginnezumi (空は銀鼠, The Sky is Silver-grey; 1994)
- 50 (Half) (1995)
- Ai-suru tame niha Uso ga iru (愛するためにはウソがいる, Love needs lies; 1995)
- Ai to Shi wo Mitsumete (愛と死をみつめて, Fix your eyes on Love and Death; 1996)
- Michiro (道郎, Michirō; 1997)
- Off (2000)
- Aipa (2000)
- Notalin's (2004, with Notalin's)
- I, My, Me / Amami (2005)
- Unplugged Punk (2006, with M.J.Q)
- Kiga-Kiga Kikyo (2007)
- Aipa (December 12, 2009)
- Tenbatsu Nanka Kuso Kurae Tsu!!! (天罰なんかクソ喰らえっ!!!; March 16, 2011, with M.J.Q)
- Fukushima (2015)
- 0 (Zero) (0（ゼロ）; 2015, with The End)

=== Other work ===
- Parade -Respective Tracks of Buck-Tick- (December 21, 2005, "Sasayaki")
