= Group Tamashii =

Japanese comedy rock band

- Also known as: グループ魂
- Origin: Kanagawa, Japan
- Genres: Rock, comedy rock, punk rock
- Years active: 1995-present
- Labels: MIDI; Ki/oon Records
- Members: Hakai; Boudou; Baito Kun; Minato Kaoru; Kozono; Sekken; Chikoku

Group Tamashii (グループ魂, Gurūpu Tamashii) is a Japanese comedy rock band. It was started by actors in a theatrical company called "Otona Keikaku" (Project Adult) in 1995. Its original members were Hakai (Sadao Abe), Boudou (Kankuro Kudo), and Baito Kun (Seminosuke Murasugi). When it started, the group was just a group of comedians using the guitar. The members perform in many theaters, and also at Shōten. In 1997, bass, guitar, and drum players join and became a band. In 2002 they released their debut album called Run Tamashi Run (Run魂Run) while they were signed to an indie label, "MIDI". In 2005, Group Tamashi signed to Ki/oon Records. The name of the band derives from the song "Tamashi Kogashite" of the rock band ARB. The reason they put the "Group" in the band name is "Nobody didn't say 'Group' by myself." In 2008 they released a long-awaited new album entitled "Patsun Patsun". It was their longest album to date, at 27 tracks, and featured them covering a new variety of musical genres such as reggae and hip-hop. 2010 marks the group's 15th anniversary, and several releases and events are scheduled in honor of it, including a new album entitled 1!2!3!4!.

Several members of Group Tamashii also have jobs as actors and writers, in addition to their music careers.

== Members ==
- Vocal: Hakai "Destroy" (Sadao Abe)
- Guitar: Boudou "Riot" (Kankuro Kudo)
- Harmonica: Baito Kun "Side Job" (Seminosuke Murasugi)
- Vocal: Minato Kaworu (Sarutoki Minagawa)
- Bass: Kozono (Ryuichi Kozono)
- Drums: Sekken "Soap" (Hiroki Miyake)
- Guitar: Chikoku "Late" (Taku Tomizawa)

== Discography ==
=== Limited Edition Music ===
- Super! Summer! Axebomber! Love Hunter! 06! (スーパー!サマー!アックスボンバー! ラブハンター! 06!) (2006-08-01)

=== Singles ===
- Riki Takeuchi (竹内力, Takeuchi Riki) (2003-02-05)
- Honda Hirotarou~magical mystery UPAAAAAAAAA!!!!!~ (本田博太郎～magical mystery UPAAAAAAAAA!!!!!～) (2005-07-27)
- Kimi ni Juice o Katte Ageru (君にジュースを買ってあげる♥) (I Want to Buy You Some Juice) (2005-10-26) (3rd opening song of Sgt. Frog)
- O-ma-e Rōtenshon Gaaru (お・ま・えローテンションガール) (2007-06-13)
- Love Love Essaimu'82 (ラブラブエッサイム'82) (2010-07-21)
- Bero Bero (べろべろ) (2010-10-27)
- DaDaDa (だだだ) (2011-02-02) (1st opening song of the anime Beelzebub)

=== Album ===
==== Indie Album ====
- GROOPER (1999-03-25) (This album is mostly comic.)

==== Major Albums ====
- Run Tamashii Run (Run魂Run) (2002-12-25)
- Araburu Nihon no Tamashi-tachi (荒ぶる日本の魂たち) (2004-06-23)
- TMC (2005-11-23)
- Yome to Rock (嫁とロック, Yome to Rokku) (Bride and Rock) (2006-12-06)
- Patsun Patsun (ぱつんぱつん, Patsun Patsun) (2008-06-18)
- 1!2!3!4! (2010-11-24)

==== Other ====
- Group Tamashii no Denki Mamushi no Santora (グループ魂のでんきまむしのサントラ) (1999)
- Respectable Roosters→Z a-gogo (2005) (The Roosters tribute album)
- Matchy Tribute (2006) (Masahiko Kondo tribute album)
- Romantist - The Stalin, Michiro Endo Tribute Album (2010) (The Stalin and Michiro Endo tribute album)

=== DVD ===
- Group Tamashii's In a Sense Tour (グループ魂のある意味ツアー, Gurūppu Tamashii no Aru Imi Tsuā) (2003-12-03)
- Group Tamashii's Rain of Noon (Doing fine weather) (グループ魂の雨の野音(晴天決行), Gurūpu Tamashii no Ame no Yaon (Seiten Kekkou)) (2005-04-27)
- Minato Kaworu in the City of Bandits Tour ~A Group Tamashii Musical Performance~ (港カヲル in 都会の山賊ツアー～演奏・グループ魂～, Minato Kaworu in Tokai no Sanzoku Tsuā ~Ensou Gurūppu Tamashii~) (2006-04-26)
- Group Tamashii's Company Trip ~Bonus: Live at Yokohama Britts~ (グループ魂の慰安旅行～特典映像・ライヴat横浜ブリッツ～, Gurūppu Tamashii no Ianryokō ~Tokuten Eizo•Raivu at Yokohama Burittsu~)(2007-12-12)
- Group Tamashii at The Chichibu Patsun Patsun Festival~ (グループ魂の秩父ぱつんぱつんフェスティバル(雨) Gurūppu Tamashii no Chichibu Patsun Patsun Festival) (2009-02-11)

=== Publications ===
- Hai Domo Konbanwa-!! (はいどおもこんばんわぁ!!) (Tankōbon) (Sony Magazines publication)
- Group Tamashii/Best Tamashii (グループ魂/ベスト魂, Gurūppu Tamashii/Besuto Tamashii) (band-score)

=== Film ===
- Group Tamashii no Denki Mamushi (グループ魂のでんきまむし) (1999)
