= Sadao Abe =

Japanese actor and musician (born 1970)

Sadawo Abe
- 阿部 サダヲ
- Born: 阿部 隆史 (Takashi Abe); April 23, 1970 (age 56); Matsudo, Chiba Prefecture, Japan
- Other name: Sadawo Abe
- Occupations: Actor, singer
- Years active: 1992—present
- Children: 2
- Website: http://otonakeikaku.jp/profile/profile_abe.html

Sadawo Abe (阿部 サダヲ, Abe Sadawo; born Abe Takashi (阿部 隆史); April 23, 1970) is a Japanese actor, stage actor, and musician from Matsudo, Chiba Prefecture. He started his acting career after joining a theater company/talent agency, Otona Keikaku, in around 1992 and gained his popularity after the drama series Team Medical Dragon and as being the lead singer of the Japanese comedy rock band Group Tamashii. His stage name is a pun on notorious geisha Sada Abe.

Abe was nominated for best actor in the 31st Japanese Academy Award for Maiko Haaaan!!!.

== Filmography ==
=== Film ===
- Naked Blood (1995), Eiji Kure
- Tokiwa: The Manga Apartment (1996), Hiroshi Fujimoto
- After Life (1998)
- Uzumaki (2000), Mitsuru Yamaguchi
- Kamikaze Girls (2004), Ryuji 'the Unicorn'/Doctor
- The Great Yokai War (2005)
- Yaji and Kita: The Midnight Pilgrims (2005)
- Helen the Baby Fox (2006), police officer
- Ten Nights of Dream (segment - The 6th Night) (2006)
- Kisarazu Cat's Eye: World Series (2006), Kaoru Nekota
- Maiko Haaaan!!! (2007), Kimihiko Onizuka
- Paco and the Magical Picture Book (2008), Horigome
- Yatterman (2009), Dr. Kaieda
- Friends: Mononoke Shima no Naki (2011), Gōyan (voice)
- Gothic Lolita Battle Bear (2013), teddy bear (voice)
- Parasyte: Part 1 (2014), Migi (voice)
- Parasyte: Part 2 (2015), Migi (voice)
- The Magnificent Nine (2016), Juzaburo Kokudaya
- Birds Without Names (2017), Jinji
- Louder!: Can't Hear What You're Singin', Wimp (2018), Shin
- The 47 Ronin in Debt (2019), Asano "Takumi no Kami" Naganori
- Mother (2020), Ryo
- Lesson in Murder (2022), Yamato Haimura
- I Am Makimoto (2022), Sō Makimoto
- Shylock's Children (2023), Masahiro Nishiki
- Revolver Lily (2023), Isoroku Yamamoto
- Last Mile (2024), Ryuhei Yagi
- 11 Rebels (2024), Mizoguchi Takumi
- Cells at Work! (2024), Shigeru Urushizaki
- The Man Who Carried the Voices of August (2026), Kazuhei Kuno

=== Television ===
- Karin (1993)
- Bayside Shakedown (1997), Saeki
- Ikebukuro West Gate Park (2000), Hamaguchi
- Summer Snow (2000)
- Kisarazu Cat's Eye (2002), Kaoru Nekota
- Kokoro (2003)
- Tiger & Dragon (2005), Hayashiyatei Donta
- Unfair (2006), Kokubo Yuji
- Dare Yorimo Mama wo Ai su (2006), Pinko
- Team Medical Dragon (2006), Monji Arase
- First Kiss (2007), Masaru Nikaido
- Team Medical Dragon 2 (2007), Monji Arase
- The Waste Land (2009), Hideo Tahara
- Marumo no Okite (2011), Mamoru Takagi (Marumo)
- Taira no Kiyomori (2012), Shinzei
- Keisei Saimin no Otoko Part 2 (2015), Ichizō Kobayashi
- Gekokujō juken (2017), Shinichi Sakurai
- Naotora: The Lady Warlord (2017), Tokugawa Ieyasu
- Anone (2018), Kaji Mochimoto
- Idaten (2019), Masaji Tabata
- Taiga Drama ga Umareta Hi (2023), Kinji Kusuda
- Extremely Inappropriate! (2024), Ichiro Ogawa
- Anpan (2025), Sōkichi Yamura
- Their Marriage (2025), Kotaro Harada
- The Man Who Carried the Voices of August (2025), Kazuhei Kuno
- Extremely Inappropriate! Special (2026), Ichiro Ogawa
