= The Stalin =

Japanese punk rock band

- The Stalin: Tam, Jun, Michiro, Shintaro

Background information
- Also known as: Video Stalin, Stalin
- Origin: Fukushima, Japan
- Genres: Punk rock; hardcore punk
- Years active: 1980–1985, 1987–1988, 1989–1993
- Labels: Political, Tokuma Japan, BQ, Alfa
- Past members: Michiro Endo (deceased); Atsushi Kaneko; Shintaro Sugiyama; Jun Inui; Kazuo Tamura; Hitoshi Oda; Makoto Tsugio; Keigo Nakata; Tatsuya Nakamura; June-Bleed; Masahiro Kitada; Teruya Ogata; Masayuki Ono; Kubota; May; Shoko; Aihiko Yamamori; Yusuke Nishimura; Ritsu Saito; Chikao Adachi; Shigeo Mihara

The Stalin (ザ・スターリン; stylized as THE STALIN) were a Japanese punk rock band formed in June 1980, by leader and vocalist Michiro Endo. After numerous member changes, he disbanded the group in February 1985. In May 1987 Michiro formed a group called Video Stalin, which mostly made videos instead of albums; they disbanded in 1988. In 1989 Michiro created a new band named Stalin and continued to make music with them until 1993.

== History ==
=== 1979: Jiheitai ===
Circa 1979, Michiro Endo, a 29-year-old socialist activist, formed a punk band called Jiheitai (自閉体). Several of their songs would later become The Stalin songs, such as "Ideologist", "Niku" and their versions of "No Fun" and "Light My Fire".

=== 1980–1981: Beginning ===
In June 1980 Endo formed The Stalin. He chose the name because "Joseph Stalin is very hated by most people in Japan, so it is very good for our image." Originally a three piece with Endo on vocals and bass, Atsushi on guitar and Jun on drums. Shintaro joined as bassist later in the month, however their first single, "Dendou Kokeshi", was already recorded without him and was released on September 5, 1980. On April 7, 1981, they released the Stalinism EP. In July Tam replaced Atsushi on guitar. On November 4, at a live performance at Kanto Gakuin High School, Endo is arrested for indecent exposure. On December 24, 1981, they released their first full-length album, the half studio/half live, Trash.

=== 1982–1985: The End ===
The Stalin were one of the bands to star in Sogo Ishii's movie Burst City, released on March 13, 1982. Their concert on June 24 was the last with drummer Jun, however he still appears on their major label debut album Stop Jap, as well as their first major label single "Romantist", both released on July 1, as they were recorded before he left. "Romantist" is a reworked version of "Ideologist" from Trash, and has become their most well-known song worldwide. Hitoshi joins as drummer in July 1982. Sogo Ishii also directed a promotional video for "Romantist", as well as "Stop Jap" and their next single "Allergy", which was released on August 25. Their concert on September 27, 1982, was the last with Hitoshi. In November Keigo joins on drums, but leaves in December along with Tam.

In January 1983, Makoto joins on guitar and Tatsuya on drums. On February 10, they released their fourth single "Go Go Stalin". Their next album Mushi and single "Nothing", are both released on April 25. After a June 11 gig, Makoto and Tatsuya leave. Also in June 1983 Shintaro leaves. At a concert on September 17, Teruya and former member Jun, play as guest support on guitar and drums respectively.

In early 1984, June-Bleed joins as guitarist. But on March 17, 1984, he leaves and is eventually replaced by Masahiro. Also in March, Jun rejoins the band on drums and Teruya joins as bassist. In May, their song "Chicken Farm" appeared on MRR's international Welcome to 1984 compilation. The concert on June 3 was the last with Masahiro and Teruya. Also in June Hiroshi would become support bassist, never officially joining. Masayuki joined on guitar in August 1984. Their last album Fish Inn was released on November 20. After their concert on December 29, Endo announced "This is the end of The Stalin". Although their true last concert was held on February 21, 1985, at Chofu Daiei Studio and was entitled "I was the Stalin". The show was recorded and released, on both VHS, Last Live – Zessan Kaisan Naka!!, and double LP, For Never – Last Live, on May 25, 1985.

=== 1987–1988: Video Stalin ===
In May 1987, Endo created Video Stalin, a group of musicians who were more of a video production group than a band. They released three videos and one album. One of the videos, Your Order! The History of The Stalin, can be considered a The Stalin video instead, as it is composed almost entirely of live footage and promo clips throughout The Stalin's career. They disbanded in 1988.

=== 1989–1993: Stalin ===
Inspired by the monumental events of 1988, especially the dissolution of the Soviet Union, Endo revived The Stalin with new members and a new name, now simply Stalin. He had been fascinated with the Polish Solidarity movement, which began the same year as The Stalin, and after a visit to Warsaw he organized a Japanese tour for the Polish punk band Dezerter. Stalin completed the cultural exchange in 1990 when they toured Eastern Europe, which was recorded and released as the Saigo no Akai Natsu -Stalin Call in East Europe- video. They had a couple line-up changes and released six singles, four studio albums and one live album, before calling it quits in 1993.

=== Occasional performances and Endo's death ===
On February 8, 2001, there was a special The Stalin concert entitled "One Night Dream". Michiro Endo performed with Keigo Nakata (ex:The Stalin) on drums, Shinichi Suzuki (Pulling Teeth) on guitar and Katsuta on bass. Other bands and artists also performed and paid tribute to the group, including Loopus, Cobra, Panta and Kenzi. The show was recorded and released as the Hakike Gasuruhodo Romanchikku Daze!! video on June 30, 2001. The concert coincided with the release of the 365 – A Tribute to The Stalin album, which has some of the bands that performed covering The Stalin songs.

On December 1, 2010, two tribute albums were released. One entitled Romantist – The Stalin, Michiro Endo Tribute Album, features bands such as Buck-Tick, Dir En Grey, Group Tamashii and Jun Togawa covering The Stalin and Michiro Endo songs. The other Red Demon, Blue Demon – Michiro Endo 60th Birthday Anniversary Tribute Album, features different artists and was first released at Endo's concert on November 14 to coincide with his 60th birthday.

Endo still gathered various musicians for occasional The Stalin performances. The last being a few shows in early 2011 as "The Stalin Z", with the line-up of Endo on vocals, Tatsuya Nakamura (ex:The Stalin) on drums, KenKen (Rize) on bass and Kazuhiro Hyaku (Mo'Some Tonebender) on guitar.

Michiro Endo died in a Tokyo hospital while battling pancreatic cancer on April 25, 2019, aged 68.

== Members ==
- Michiro Endo – vocals (1980–1985, 1987–1988, 1989–1993), bass (1980) (Notalin's, M.J.Q, Touch Me)

=== The Stalin ===
- Atsushi Kaneko – guitar (1980–1981)
- Kazuo "Tam" Tamura – guitar (1981–1982) (ex:Typhus,→G-Zet)
- Tsugio Makoto – guitar (1983) (ex:The Onanizo Bomb,→The God)
- June-Bleed – guitar (1984) (The Willard)
- Masahiro Kitada – guitar (1984)
- Masayuki Ono – guitar (1984–1985) (ex:Allergy)
- Shintaro Sugiyama – bass (1980–1983)
- Teruya Ogata – guitar (support guest) (1983), bass (1984)
- Hiroshi Higo – bass (support member) (1984–1985) (Shibusashirazu Orchestra)
- Jun Inui – drums (1980–1982), (1984–1985)
- Hitoshi Oda – drums (1982)
- Keigo Nakata – drums (1983) (ex:Enola Gay,→G-Zet, Lip Cream, Nickey & The Warriors, The Star Club, Cobra)
- Tatsuya Nakamura – drums (1983) (ex:The Onanizo Bomb, →The God, Masturbation, Nickey & The Warriors, Blankey Jet City, Losalios, The Star Club, Touch Me, Friction)

=== Video Stalin ===
- Kubota – guitar (1987–1988)
- Sakamitsu – guitar (1987)
- May – bass (1987–1988)
- Shoko – drums (1987–1988)

=== Stalin ===
- Aihiko Yamamori – guitar (1989–1990)
- Tadashi "Ritsu" Saito – guitar (1990–1993) (→Loopus, Minimum Rockets)
- Yusuke Nishimura – bass (1989–1990)
- Chikao Adachi – bass (1990–1993)
- Shigeo Mihara – drums (1989–1993) (→The Roosters)

== Discography ==
=== The Stalin ===
Albums & EPs

- Stalinism (April 7, 1981)
- Trash (October 21, 1981) Oricon Albums Chart Peak Position: No. 14 (2020 reissue)
- Stop Jap (July 1, 1982)
- Mushi (虫, The Insect) (April 25, 1983)
- Fish Inn (November 20, 1984)
- For Never – Last Live (double live album, May 25, 1985)
- Fish Inn (1986 Mix) (December 21, 1986)
- Stalinism (compilation album, January 21, 1987)
- Bestests (compilation album, July 1987)
- Shinda Mono Hodo Aishite Yaru Sa (死んだものほど愛してやるさ; 'I'll Love You as Much as a Dead Thing', live album, 1995)
- The Stalin Best Selection (compilation album, December 21, 1996)
- The Stalin Best (compilation album, January 22, 2003)
- Zetsubou dai Kairaku ~Live at Kourakuen Horu~ (絶望大快楽 〜LIVE at 後楽園ホール'83〜; 'Desperate Pleasure -Live at Korakuen Hall '83-', live album, December 5, 2005)
- Stop Jap Naked (October 24, 2007)
- I Was The Stalin ~Zessan Kaisan Naka~ Kanzenban (〜絶賛解散中〜 完全版; live album, March 14, 2012) No. 138
- Stalinism Naked (April 20, 2019) No. 118
- Buta ni Shinju ~Live at Yokohama Kokuritsu Daigaku 1980.11~ (豚に真珠～LIVE at 横浜国立大学1980.11～; live album, December 23, 2020) No. 197

Singles

- "Dendou Kokeshi" (電動こけし, Electric Dildo; September 5, 1980)
- "Romantist" (ロマンチスト, Romanchisuto; July 1, 1982)
- "Allergy" (アレルギー, Arerugii; August 25, 1982)
- "Go Go Stalin" (GoGoスターリン, Go Go Sutarin; February 10, 1983)
- "Nothing" (April 25, 1983)

Videos

- Last Live – Zessan Kaisan Naka!! (LAST LIVE 絶賛解散中!!, Last Live – Dissolution of Praise!!; May 25, 1985)
- Your Order! The History of The Stalin (June 25, 1987)
- Hakike Gasuruhodo Romanchikku Daze!! (吐き気がするほどロマンチックだぜ!!, I'm Romantic Enough to be Sick!!; June 30, 2001)

=== Video Stalin ===
Albums

- -1 (Minus One) (1988)

Videos

- Debut! (1987)
- Love Terrorist (1988)

=== Stalin ===
Albums

- Joy (February 25, 1989)
- Stalin (1989)
- Sakkin Barricade (殺菌バリケード, Sterilization Barricade; September 25, 1990) No. 93
- Street Value (compilation album, July 21, 1991)
- Yukuefumei -Live to be Stalin- (行方不明 〜LIVE TO BE STALIN〜, Missing -Live to be Stalin-; live album, December 21, 1991)
- Kiseki no Hito (奇跡の人, The Miracle Worker; November 21, 1992)

Singles

- "Houchou & Manjuu" (包丁とマンジュウ, Kitchen Knife & Bun; 1989)
- "Benkyou ga Dekinai" (勉強ができない, Can't Study; September 25, 1989)
- "'90s Sentimental Osechi" ('90sセンチメンタルおせち, '90s Senchimentaru Osechi; 1989)
- "Mayonaka no Omocha Bako" (真夜中のオモチャ箱, Toy Box of Midnight; September 25, 1990)
- "Wild Ghetto" (July 21, 1991)
- "Ride on Time" (ライド・オン・タイム, Raido on Taimu; November 21, 1992)

Videos

- P. (1989)
- Saigo no Akai Natsu -Stalin Call in East Europe- (最後の赤い夏 ~Stalin Call in East Europe~, Last Red Summer -Stalin Call in East Europe-; October 25, 1990)
