= Parasyte =

Japanese manga series and its franchise

- Fourth tankōbon volume cover, featuring Migi (left) and Shinichi Izumi (right)

寄生獣 (Kiseijū)
- Genre: Body horror; Horror thriller; Science fiction
- Manga
- Written by: Hitoshi Iwaaki
- Published by: Kodansha
- English publisher: NA: Kodansha USA; Tokyopop (former); Del Rey Manga (former)
- Imprint: Afternoon KC
- Magazine: Morning Open Zōkan; (July – September 19, 1989); Monthly Afternoon; (November 25, 1989 – December 24, 1994)
- English magazine: NA: MixxZine
- Original run: July 1989 – December 24, 1994
- Volumes: 10
- Anime television series

Parasyte -the maxim- (Note: Also stylized as Parasyte: The Maxim.)
- Directed by: Kenichi Shimizu
- Produced by: Toshio Nakatani; Hiroyuki Inage; Atsushi Kirimoto; Yuka Ōshima; Sōta Shioiri; Daisuke Fukada
- Written by: Shōji Yonemura
- Music by: Ken Arai
- Studio: Madhouse
- Licensed by: AUS: Hanabee; NA: Sentai Filmworks; UK: Animatsu Entertainment (former); Anime Limited (current)
- Original network: Nippon TV
- English network: NA: Anime Network; SEA: Animax; US: Adult Swim (Toonami)
- Original run: October 9, 2014 – March 26, 2015
- Episodes: 24
- Manga

Parasyte Reversi
- Written by: Moare Ohta
- Published by: Kodansha
- English publisher: NA: Kodansha USA (digitally); US: Kodansha (digitally)
- Imprint: Afternoon KC
- Magazine: Comic Days
- Original run: March 2, 2018 – May 7, 2021
- Volumes: 8
- Live-action
- Parasyte: Part 1 (2014 film, Japan); Parasyte: Part 2 (2015 film, Japan); Parasyte: The Grey (2024 TV series, South Korea); Parasyte: Tamiya (2027 TV series, Japan–South Korea)
- icon

Parasyte (Japanese: 寄生獣, Hepburn: Kiseijū; lit. 'Parasitic Beasts') is a Japanese manga series written and illustrated by Hitoshi Iwaaki. It was published in Kodansha's seinen manga magazines Morning Open Zōkan (1989) and Monthly Afternoon (1989 to 1994). The manga was published in North America first by Tokyopop, then Del Rey, and finally Kodansha USA. The series follows Shinichi Izumi, a high school senior who is the victim of a failed attempt by a parasitic organism to take over his brain. The parasite, Migi, instead infects and takes over his arm, and both are forced in a peculiar partnership to fight other parasites.

The manga has been adapted into two live-action films in Japan, in 2014 and 2015. An anime television series adaptation produced by Madhouse, titled Parasyte -the maxim-, aired in Japan between October 2014 and March 2015. The English-language dub aired on Adult Swim's Toonami programming block in the United States between October 2015 and April 2016. A South-Korean live-action series spin-off, titled Parasyte: The Grey, premiered on Netflix in April 2024.

By August 2022, the manga had over 25 million copies in circulation, making it one of the best-selling manga series of all time. In 1993, Parasyte received the 17th Kodansha Manga Award for the general category, as well as the 27th Seiun Award for the best manga in 1996.

== Plot ==
A manga panel showing a Parasite getting ready to eat a human being.

Parasyte centers on a 17-year-old male high school student named Shinichi Izumi, who lives with his mother and father in a quiet neighborhood in Fukuyama, Hiroshima, Japan. One night, tiny worm-like organisms with drill-like heads called Parasites appear on Earth, taking over the brains of their hosts by entering through their ears or noses. One Parasite attempts to crawl into Shinichi's nose while he sleeps, but fails as Shinichi wakes up, and enters his body by burrowing into his arm instead. In the Japanese version, it takes over his right hand and is named Migi (ミギー), after the Japanese word for "right".

Because Shinichi was able to prevent Migi from traveling further up into his brain, both beings retain their separate intellects and personalities. As the duo encounters other Parasites, they capitalize on their strange situation and gradually form a strong bond, working together to survive. This gives them an edge in battling other Parasites who frequently attack the pair upon realization that Shinichi's human brain is still intact. Shinichi feels compelled to fight other Parasites, who devour other members of the species they infect as food, while enlisting Migi's help.

The series explores philosophical and psychological questions such as the meaning of humanity, humans' relationship to the environment and other species, the role of instinct and love, and the inherent anthropocentrism of morality. Shinichi's experience with Migi causes him to question if humanity has any right to claim moral superiority to the Parasites, while Migi and Reiko Tamura's experiences with humans cause them to take on more human traits, such as love and sacrifice.

== Development ==
Before debuting as a manga artist, Hitoshi Iwaaki originally conceived the story for Parasyte as a romantic comedy, with the main character's hand simply moving on its own and causing problems. Iwaaki shelved this story for seven years, in the meantime working as a manga assistant and creating his own manga series on Kodansha's Morning magazine, Fūko no Iru Mise.

After completing Fūko no Iru Mise, Iwaaki went back to Parasyte, using what he learned to plan out the rest of the story: instead of creating the characters first, then writing events in the story around them like in Fūko no Iru Mise, he would start with the events first, then create characters that could deal with them. Parasyte was originally planned as a short, three-chapter series.

In a 2016 interview with Kodansha, Iwaaki stated that he had imagined the Parasites as creatures that were biologically efficient to the point that their designs were simple; for example, Migi being drawn as mostly just an eye and mouth on Shinichi Izumi's hand. Iwaaki speculated that while designing Migi, he may have been inspired by "monsters in [Japanese] traditional folk tales that are just a hand with eyeballs or, like, a talking tumor." Iwaaki also clarified that the inspiration for Parasyte came from watching documentaries about food chains in nature at a young age, particularly in relation to anthropocentrism, stating "I remember wanting to write about the 'egotism of the human race over this planet,' but I didn't want to look down on humans. I just wanted to tell the story from an ordinary person's point of view."

From the beginning, Iwaaki included themes of environmentalism and criticism of anthropocentrism in Parasyte. While writing the ending, Iwaaki decided to change Goto's fate, who was originally planned to have been spared by Shinichi. Goto, having either fully or partially revived himself, would then escape to live within nature. Aside from already disliking the planned ending, Iwaaki felt that Goto represented the "beautiful wildness and the greatness of nature—as opposed to the destructive, polluting foolishness of humans", but decided to have Shinichi kill him off anyway since he felt the theme of criticizing humanity had become too ubiquitous by then, compared to when he first started Parasyte.

Iwaaki chose a high school setting due to a scene he had thought of. When considering a scene where Migi turns his shape into a penis in front of Satomi Murano, Iwaaki believed that the scene would work best in that setting.

== Media ==
=== Manga ===
Written and illustrated by Hitoshi Iwaaki, Parasyte was first published for three chapters in the special issue of Kodansha's seinen manga magazine Morning, Morning Open Zōkan, from the F to H issues (August 1 to October 3, 1989 (Note: Issue H was released two weeks before, on September 19, 1989.) issues). The series was later transferred to the publisher's Monthly Afternoon magazine on November 25, 1989, (Note: It resumed in the magazine's January 1990 issue, released on November 25, 1989.) and finished on December 24, 1994. (Note: It finished in the magazine's February 1995 issue, released on December 24, 1994.) Kodansha collected its 64 chapters in ten tankōbon volumes, released from July 23, 1990, to March 23, 1995. It was later republished in eight kanzenban volumes from January 23 to June 23, 2003.

It was originally licensed for English translation and North American distribution by Tokyopop, which published the series over 12 volumes from 1998 to 2002. The Tokyopop version ran in MixxZine. Daily pages from the Tokyopop version ran in the Japanimation Station, a service accessible to users of America Online. The Tokyopop English-language manga went out of print on May 2, 2005. Del Rey Manga later acquired the rights to the series, and published eight volumes following the kanzenban release between 2007 and 2009. Kodansha USA republished the volumes in North America between 2011 and 2012. In March 2025, Kodansha USA announced a new black-and-white paperback edition, featuring an updated translation, restored original art, updated interior design, and new covers, with the first volume scheduled for release on December 16 of the same year.

==== Tributes and spin-off ====
A tribute project titled Neo Parasyte m (ネオ寄生獣, Neo Kiseijū), consisting of various one-shots written and illustrated by various manga artists, and based on the original manga to promote the then-upcoming anime adaptation, began publishing on Monthly Afternoon on September 25, 2014. The list of collaborators includes Akira Hiramoto, Yukari Takinami, Yasushi Nirasawa, Hiroki Endo, Riichi Ueshiba, Ryōji Minagawa, Takatoshi Kumakura, Peach-Pit, Hiro Mashima, Moare Ohta, Takayuki Takeya and Moto Hagio. The stories were collected into a single volume, published by Kodansha on July 22, 2016. In North America, Kodansha USA published the volume on November 21, 2017.

Another tribute project, titled Neo Parasyte f (ネオ寄生獣f, Neo Kiseijū f), began in Kodansha's Aria magazine on September 27, 2014. The list of collaborators includes MikiMaki, Miki Rinno, Ema Tōyama, Hikaru Suruga, Asumiko Nakamura, Kaori Yuki, Yuri Narushima, Yui Kuroe, Renjuro Kindaichi, Banko Kuze, Kashio, Yūki Obata, Asia Watanabe, Lalako Kojima and Hajime Shinjō. Kodansha compiled the stories into two volumes, published digitally on April 24, 2015. Kodansha USA published the stories in a single volume, released on October 25, 2016.

A spin-off manga, titled Parasyte Reversi (寄生獣リバーシ, Kiseijū Ribāshi), started on Kodansha's Comic Days app on March 2, 2018. It was written and illustrated by Moare Ohta. The series finished on May 7, 2021, and was collected into eight volumes. Kodansha published the series in English on its K Manga digital service. Kodansha USA has licensed the manga for digital release and the first volume was released on October 8, 2024.

=== Anime ===
An anime television series adaptation titled Parasyte -the maxim- (寄生獣 セイの格率, Kiseijū Sei no Kakuritsu) aired on Nippon TV from October 9, 2014, to March 26, 2015. It was produced by Madhouse, Nippon Television, VAP, and Forecast Communications, and directed by Kenichi Shimizu, with Shōji Yonemura handling series composition, Tadashi Hiramatsu designing the characters and Ken Arai composing the music. The opening theme song is "Let Me Hear" performed by Fear, and loathing in Las Vegas. The ending theme is "It's the Right Time" performed by Daichi Miura. At Anime Expo 2015, Sentai Filmworks announced that the anime would run on Adult Swim's Toonami programming block on October 4, 2015.

The series was simulcast by Crunchyroll outside of Asia and by Animax Asia in Southeast Asia and South Asia. Sentai Filmworks has licensed the anime for North America, South America, United Kingdom, Australia, and New Zealand release. UK Distributor Animatsu Entertainment released the series in the UK and Ireland. In Australia and New Zealand, Hanabee acquired the series and released it within the region. The English dub, provided and distributed by Sentai Filmworks, was released on DVD and Blu-ray in two parts in 2016, with part 1 (episodes 1–12) on April 5, and part 2 (episodes 13–24) on July 5. Anime Limited will release the series in a "Collector's Blu-ray" edition in the United Kingdom and Ireland.

=== Live-action films ===
Hollywood's New Line Cinema had acquired the film rights to Parasyte in 2005, and a film adaptation was reported to be in the works, with Jim Henson Studios and Don Murphy allegedly in charge of production. New Line Cinema's option expired in 2013, prompting a bidding war in Japan. Film studio and distributor Toho won the rights, and decided to adapt the manga into a two-part live-action film series directed by Takashi Yamazaki. The first part, Parasyte: Part 1, was released in November 2014 and the second part, Parasyte: Part 2, was released in April 2015.

=== Live-action TV series ===
In August 2022, Netflix announced a South Korean series adaptation, titled Parasyte: The Grey. It was directed by Yeon Sang-ho and produced by Climax Studio and Wow Point, with Jeon So-nee, Koo Kyo-hwan and Lee Jung-hyun in leading roles. It premiered its six episodes worldwide on April 5, 2024.

Another series, titled Parasyte: Tamiya, is set to premiere globally on Netflix in 2027. It will star Shioli Kutsuna as Ryoko Tamiya. A co-production between Japan and South Korea, Yeon Sang-ho is credited as developer, and is also co-writing the script alongside Ryu Yong-jae. The series will be directed by Kensaku Kakimoto and Kazuhiro Nakagawa with Episcope and Wow Point are producing studios.

== Reception ==
Parasyte won the 17th Kodansha Manga Award for the general category in 1993. It also won the 27th Seiun Award for being the best manga of the year in 1996. On TV Asahi's Manga Sōsenkyo 2021 poll, in which 150,000 people voted for their top 100 manga series, Parasyte ranked 60th.

By November 2013, the manga had over 11 million copies in circulation. By December 2020, the manga had more than 24 million copies in circulation; it had over 25 million copies in circulation by August 2022.

The manga series has been praised and recommended by Waseda University professor and literary critic Norihiro Kato, and by philosopher Shunsuke Tsurumi. The manga artist Machiko Satonaka praised the work and described it as "a masterpiece that makes you think about fundamental problems that raises the awareness of identity establishment". Connie Zhang of Mania.com ranked the first volume of Parasyte as A−. Zhang wrote that the series' main focus is the dynamic relationship between Shinichi and Migi and their discussions about human nature. Zhang stated: "It is this casual philosophical pandering that makes Parasyte a cerebral manga. As the parasytes gradually adapt to human life and become cleverer at disguising their true identities, Shinichi finds himself in more and more danger". She concluded: "Parasyte is not just about a teenager saving the world. It is about a teenager at the cusp of adulthood and his cynical, mutinous right hand...saving the world. Highly recommended".

The anime adaptation by Madhouse was well received by critics and fans alike, getting praise for the animation, characterization, pacing and the soundtrack of the anime. In November 2019, Crunchyroll listed Parasyte -the maxim- in their "Top 100 best anime of the 2010s". IGN listed it among the best anime series of the 2010s.

=== China ban ===
On June 12, 2015, the Chinese Ministry of Culture listed Parasyte among 38 anime and manga titles banned in mainland China. Nonetheless, the live-action version of Parasyte managed to be released in nationwide cinemas across mainland China, using a 125-minute special cut which condensed part 1 and part 2.
