= Tomie (film series) =

- DVD set containing the first 5 films.
- Directed by: Ataru Oikawa; Toshirō Inomata; Fujirō Mitsuishi; Takashi Shimizu; Shun Nakahara; Tomohiro Kubo; Noboru Iguchi
- Written by: Ataru Oikawa; Satoru Tamaki; Yoshinobu Fujioka; Tomohiro Kubo; Jun Tsugita; Noboru Iguchi
- Produced by: Yasuhiko Azuma; Naotada Itô; Yasuhiko Higashi; Tôru Ishii; Mikihiko Hirata; Gen Satô
- Starring: Miho Kanno; Runa Nagai; Mai Hosho; Miki Sakai; Nozomi Andô; Rio Matsumoto; Anri Ban; Yu Abiru; Emiko Matsuoka; Miu Nakamura
- Running time: 788 minutes
- Country: Japan
- Language: Japanese

Tomie (富江) is a Japanese horror film series based on Junji Ito's manga of the same name. The series consists of nine installments to date.

The series focuses on the titular Tomie Kawakami, a beautiful young girl identified by a mole under her left eye, who drives her stricken admirers to madness, often resulting in her own death. However, due to her ability of regeneration, she comes back to life to terrorize her killers.

Each cell of her body has the ability to generate into a full grown independent body, causing several copies of her to be created after each of her deaths. It is unknown how many copies of Tomie exist in the films' universe although in the most recent film, Tomie Unlimited, Tomie is shown walking through the streets of Japan, with most of the women she passes by also being Tomie. The films share no direct storyline connections, all focusing on different Tomies and their stories, except for the first installment and 2005's Tomie: Beginning.

Junji Ito has expressed his support for the films, often attending premieres and even personally picking out the actress Miho Kanno for the role of Tomie in the first film and coaching her for the audition.

== Films ==
=== Tomie (1998) ===
The film opens with the police investigating the murder of high school girl Tomie Kawakami (Miho Kanno). They learn that in the months following the crime, nine students and one teacher have either committed suicide or gone insane. The detective (Tomoro Taguchi) assigned to the case learns that three years prior another Tomie Kawakami was murdered in rural Gifu prefecture. Other slain Tomie Kawakami's are discovered stretching all the way back to the 1860s, right when Japan began to modernize. The detective tracks down one of Tomie's classmates called Tsukiko Izumisawa (Mami Nakamura), an art student who is being treated for amnesia. She has absolutely no memory of the three-month period around Tomie's death. Meanwhile, Tsukiko's neighbor (Kota Kusano) is rearing a peculiar baby-like creature. Over the span of a couple weeks, it grows into a beautiful teenaged girl with orange eyes responding to the name of Tomie Kawakami.

Soon afterwards Tomie begins seducing Tsukiko's boyfriend Yuichi (Kouta Kusano). Meanwhile, Tsukiko enters her new neighbor's apartment to investigate. Upon discovering her friend's dead body, she is attacked by her landlord and passes out due to asphyxiation. She wakes up in her psychiatrist's office and encounters Tomie. Tomie starts emotionally abusing Tsukiko and tries feeding her live cockroaches. She then begins taking group selfies with her. Soon thereafter, Tsukiko's boyfriend murders Tomie. As they go bury Tomie's headless body in the woods, she comes back to life and Tsukiko runs off further into the woods and finds herself on a boat dock. Tomie then appears once again, now fully regenerated, and kisses Tsukiko on the lips. She reveals that they are the same person. They both laugh as Tsukiko lights a flare and sets Tomie on fire.

Tsukiko is now shown leading a normal life, still taking photographs and being interested in art. One day as she goes to develop a picture she took of herself, she notices a mole under her left eye she didn't have before; the same kind of mole Tomie had. Tsukiko then looks at herself in the mirror in shock as Tomie appears, smiling.

=== Tomie: Another Face (1999) ===
An anthology TV series consisting of three episodes was released in 1999. The series was later re-edited and released as a feature film. In the first segment, Tomie (Runa Nagai) is introduced as a high school student whose body has just been found on the street with several piles of garbage. She comes back to reunite with her former boyfriend, whose ex-girlfriend is considering starting over with as he had previously left her for Tomie. Meanwhile, a man wearing a trench coat and an eye patch is following Tomie and photographing her. The ex-girlfriend exposes Tomie's true nature on the school's rooftop to the boyfriend and in the end, Tomie is thrown from the roof. The two go to bury her in the woods in a deep grave and begin making plans to conceal their work, but as they walk to school in the morning Tomie is miraculously there to confront them.

The second episode focuses on a photographer who has lost his passion for photography but regains it when he finds Tomie, this time a model/dancer of a sort at a bar. She resembles the girl from his past who gave him that passion, and proceeds to take several photos of her with her permission. The man with the eye patch is still following Tomie during the photoshoots. While Tomie is sleeping in the photographer's bed, he develops the photographs only to find that each one has two faces: Tomie's face and a ghoul's face nearby. Convinced it is not his lens, he tells Tomie this and she tells him to kill her to prove she is not a ghost. If she was a ghost, she could not die. Naturally, she does die, but when the photographer is transporting her body in his car she comes back to life and scares him out of the car. His running takes him to the place where he saw the girl from his past, and he discovers that both are Tomie when the previously dead Tomie appears behind him. He falls to his death from the cliff and the previously dead Tomie stands at his body, grinning and making a V sign while the Tomie from his past takes their picture.

The final episode has Tomie as a young woman likely in her early to mid-20s, about to be proposed to by her boyfriend. She is later nearly attacked by the man with the eye patch and sends her boyfriend to kill this man in order to prove his love for her. During his showdown with the man, the boyfriend is tasered into submission and we find out the trench coat wearing man, named Oota, is a former coroner for the police department, and Tomie was one of the bodies he had to perform an autopsy on. She stabbed his eye out in the process and crawled away. Oota shows the boyfriend several other crime scene photographs; all are of Tomie, killed in various places and ways. For losing Tomie's body he was fired, and his wife left him and took their children. For ruining his life, Oota seeks a way to kill Tomie once and for all. He tells the boyfriend to call him if he also seeks a way to kill Tomie. The boyfriend later wakes up in a park, with Tomie asking him where he's been. After finding out he didn't kill Oota, Tomie throws his engagement ring on the ground and walks away. We see the boyfriend take out his knife and follow Tomie. Later, he contacts Oota and brings Tomie's body to an incinerator where Oota is waiting. Tomie's body lies in the back of his van but she is not dead - the boyfriend says he could never kill her. Oota manages to get her body into the incinerator and burns it successfully, but her ashes soon gather together and create her face in the air before Oota. She tells him she will never die and that every single one of her ashes will become a new Tomie.

=== Tomie: Replay (2000) ===
Tomie: Replay contains elements of the manga chapter Basement. The film begins with a six-year-old girl being rushed into a hospital ER with an unusually distended stomach. Doctors begin to operate and find a disembodied head, Tomie's head, alive and growing inside the girl's belly. The head is placed in a tank of alkaline solution in the basement of the hospital for further observation. Soon after, five of the hospital workers present during the operation mysteriously leave the hospital or disappear entirely, including hospital Director Morita.

Meanwhile, a few nights later, Takeshi visits his friend Fumihito, who is recovering from some ailment in his hospital room. While visiting, Takeshi is confronted by a naked Tomie (Mai Hosho), now fully grown and escaped from the basement, who asks him to get her out of there. Takeshi takes Tomie to his apartment, and leaves Fumihito by himself, with no explanation. Later, Fumihito calls Takeshi to find out why he left. Takeshi reacts very defensively and irrationally, telling Fumihito that "Tomie belongs to me," already under Tomie's evil and seductive influence.

The next morning, Yumi, Director Morita's daughter, visits the hospital in search of her father, missing since the operation. She meets Dr. Tachibana, the only doctor present during the young girl's operation who hasn't yet left the hospital. Tachibana gives Yumi a journal recently written by her father, and soon after giving it to her he kills himself. Through the journal we learn that during the operation, Director Morita and another doctor were accidentally infected with Tomie's blood, and that through that blood Tomie is regenerating within the doctors, taking over their bodies and driving them mad. Yumi reads in her father's journal about him wanting to kill a girl named "Tomie".

Later, Yumi and Fumihito meet at a party and realize they are both looking for a girl named "Tomie". They join forces to find out what happened to Yumi's father, and to Fumihito's friend.

The next day, Yumi visits the family of the six-year-old girl who had had the operation. She learns that prior to that operation, the girl had received a kidney transplant from a girl named "Tomie". From this kidney, Tomie had begun to regenerate inside the girl's body. Meanwhile, Fumihito visits his friend Takeshi, who had gone mad after killing and decapitating Tomie in a fit of jealousy, then watching her come back to life, regenerating a new head. Takeshi soon after is committed to a mental hospital, and Fumihito becomes Tomie's new prey.

That night Yumi has a short and strange run-in with her missing father, during which he babbles about needing to kill Tomie. The following day his dead body is discovered in the hospital basement, bloated and deformed. At his funeral Yumi receives a note from Tomie, asking to meet her that night at the hospital, seemingly for a final showdown.

Yumi arrives at the hospital to find Tomie there to taunt her, and Fumihito, now under Tomie's spell, there apparently to kill her. At the last minute Fumihito decides to kill Tomie instead, chopping off her head and burning the remains. Yumi and Fumihito leave the hospital in relief.

=== Tomie: Re-birth (2001) ===
An artist named Hideo is painting his girlfriend Tomie (Miki Sakai), but she dismisses it as a poor painting and he kills her in a jealous rage with an art knife and his two friends Shunsuke and Takumi help him bury her. When the three friends are at a party Tomie shows up and the artist kills himself in the bathroom. Tomie latches onto Shunsuke and his mother kills Tomie and they cut her up together in an unnatural ecstasy. They then burn her head, which has already started to regenerate and has some crude limbs for locomotion. The portrait of Tomie allows for her regeneration, as her supernatural blood mixed with the pigments. Takumi's girlfriend Hitomi gets possessed by Tomie, in a rather viral fashion. In a fit of jealousy, the two Tomies try to eliminate the other.

Hitomi doesn't want to become a monster, and so they decide to commit suicide. However, when at a waterfall, about to commit suicide, Tomie's head grows on the side of Hitomi's neck next to her head. They all die and then Takumi's sister comes and throws flowers into the water. A small facial mole can be seen directly beneath the sister's left eye, suggesting that, because Takumi gave her the portrait of Tomie, she was also possessed by her. Thus, the sister is the newest Tomie.

=== Tomie: Forbidden Fruit (2002) ===
Tomie Hashimoto (Aoi Miyazaki) is a dreamy teen who writes homo-erotic horror fiction in which she imagines herself as Ann Bathory, a vampire (borrowing from the murderous historical figure Elizabeth Bathory). Introspective and lonely, she is picked on and bullied by her classmates at school, and lives alone with her loving, but distant widower father, Kazuhiko Hashimoto. One day, while admiring an ornate, jewel encrusted cross necklace in an antiquities shop, Tomie meets a strange, beautiful girl (Nozomi Ando) with a mole under her left eye. The mysterious stranger says her name is Tomie Kawakami. The girls become fast friends (with heavy lesbian undertones), but it soon becomes clear that theirs was not a chance meeting. Tomie Kawakami has an agenda, and it involves Kazuhiko.

It is revealed Kazuhiko was involved in a relationship with Tomie many years ago which resulted in her being murdered. However, Kazuhiko was still obsessed with Tomie and even named his own daughter after her. Tomie is back to terrorize his family and tries to convince Kazuhiko to murder his daughter. Kazuhiko ends up murdering and decapitating the monster Tomie, and throws her head into a nearby river. His daughter, Tomie H. discovers the talking head and nurses Tomie K. back to health as she regenerates but ends up killing her. She and her father ultimately end up freezing Tomie into a block of ice to prevent her from regenerating and coming back to life, but after hearing the frozen Tomie's pleas and cries Kazuhiko ends up breaking the block of ice and setting her free. Tomie K. then attacks Tomie H. but is defeated, which results in Kazuhiko locking his daughter into a freezer room. The morning after, Tomie H. is discovered by a worker from the ice sculpture company. Tomie Hashimoto is now shown living alone, with her father missing, albeit thankful because she believes he tried to save her from the other Tomie, which is the reason he teamed up with her and abandoned his daughter.

Tomie then goes to her room and continues to write her fanfiction. She writes: "Ann and Mary are friends again, there'll be no issues this time. Ann will raise her to be a real friend, a friend whom she can depend on". Tomie then opens her desk drawer and looks at a dismembered, regenerating ear. She mutters the words "...a real friend".

=== Tomie: Beginning (2005) ===
This straight-to-video movie is a prequel to the rest of the series, shot on HD, and based on the first Tomie manga by Junji Ito. It deals with the chain of events that occurred right before the first film takes place. Tomie (Rio Matsumoto) shows up as a transfer student at a high school, quickly enchanting all the males, and raising the ire of the females. As is often the case in the Tomie films, she fixates on one solitary girl whom she befriends, with overt lesbian overtones. She displays all of her typical powers, and it isn't long before the murders and madness begin. In this movie we are introduced to the teacher who promises to kill her no matter how many times he has to do the "favor" as well as the eye-patch-wearing boy of the first movie in the series.

=== Tomie: Revenge (2005) ===
Another home-video release shot on HD, this one partly based on the Tomie manga "Revenge" by Junji Ito. This time round, Tomie is played by Anri Ban. The story revolves around a young doctor (Hisako Shirata), and an unidentified, naked and wounded woman she runs down on the road one night. In her search for the wounded girl (who has a mole under her left eye) the doctor ends up in an abandoned house filled with bodies, madmen and an unconscious girl. Surely Tomie is not too far away...

=== Tomie vs Tomie (2007) ===
Partially based on the manga "The Gathering." A young man with a past begins work in a factory, where he attracts the amorous attention of a mysterious woman who lurks behind the scenes. The woman is of course a Tomie, but due to the fact that he has recently lost his girlfriend and cannot move on from her, he feels no particular attraction to Tomie. This of course intrigues Tomie, and she begins to become obsessed with him. Soon, he is caught in a vicious struggle between two rival Tomies. And neither Tomie will die.

=== Tomie Unlimited (2011) ===
Tsukiko Izumikawa (Moe Arai) is a member of the photography club in high school. On her way home with her best friend Yoshie Kazuya (Aika Ota), Tsukiko runs into her elder sister Tomie (Miu Nakamura) who goes to the same high school. Tomie is with Toshio Shinoda (Kensuke Owada) - a guy that Tsukiko secretly crushes on. Tsukiko is consumed with jealousy towards her stepsister, but at the same time is intoxicated with Tomie's beauty. Per Tomie's request, Tsukiko takes a few pictures of her. At that time Tomie tells her stepsister that she knows that she is jealous of her closer relationship with Toshio. Confused, Tsukiko stops taking pictures, and watches in horror as Tomie is crushed on her neck by a steel cross that falls from a building under construction, killing her.

One year later, Tsukiko's daily life slowly returns to some sense of normality, but she still suffers from grief and recurring nightmares over her stepsister's death. On Tomie's 18th birthday, her parents, Masashi (Kouichi Ohori) and Kimiko Izumikawa (Maiko Kawakami) and Tsukiko stand around a birthday cake in her honor. At that time someone knocks on their door. When Tsukiko goes to get the door, she sees that it is her deceased sister; Tomie stands in the doorway with her beauty shining even more brightly than before. Her parents are delighted to see Tomie and welcome her back in joyful tears, while Tsukiko is confused.

Tomie manages to get Masashi to whip Tsukiko across the back with a steam iron cable as punishment for not showing affection towards her. However, Tomie's behavior starts becoming increasingly bizarre and abnormal as she shows Tsukiko the scar on her neck that begins to evolve into a deranged, talking tumor. Tsukiko is disgusted and horrified by Tomie's tumor and she calls Tomie a "monster". Offended, Tomie decides to leave but is prevented from doing so Masashi stabs and kills her with a butcher knife.

The next morning, Tsukiko witnesses Kimiko dismembering Tomie's body in the bathroom. Kimiko then disposes of Tomie's head by throwing it away in the trash bin and goes to prepare Tsukiko's school lunch, accidentally dropping several chunks of Tomie's flesh and hair in it. At school, a new student appears at Tsukiko’s class: Tomie Kawakami, who looks just like her dead sister. While at lunch with Yoshie, who doesn’t believe Tsukiko’s concerns that her sister has come back from the dead yet again, Tsukiko sees several miniature Tomie heads growing in her lunch. Shocked and disgusted, Tsukiko runs off and throws the lunch pack into the trash. When Yoshie goes to look for Tsukiko, she hears noises in the trash and leans over to investigate. Suddenly, the miniature Tomie heads appear and strangle Yoshie with their abnormally long tongues, killing her.

Meanwhile, at home, Tomie's head rises from the trash bin and convinces her father to kill his wife and feed her body to her. Back at school, Tsukiko encounters Yoshie with a tumor on her neck similar to the one Tomie had and runs off in panic. When Yoshie enters the Judo club's room while looking for Tsukiko, she is decapitated by the members who mistook her head for the tumor's. Her headless body comes back to life and starts chasing the Judo club members. Tsukiko then walks into Toshio, witnessing him stab a Tomie to death, and a new Tomie forms out of the blood and begins kissing Toshio. Tsukiko kills Toshio and runs off into a locker room and encounters several versions of Tomie.

Just as she is about to be cornered by the Tomies, she wakes up in her bed. Her parents inform her that she is an only child and that she never had a sister when she asks about Tomie. Tsukiko sighs in relief, believing she just had a bad nightmare which proves to be false when Mashashi starts eating hair and Kimiko’s head suddenly stretches abnormally to the point where it appears to be upside down. It turns out that Japan is being overrun by intoxicatingly beautiful humanoid regenerative creatures who respond to the name Tomie, and that in order to save their family from a giant Tomie head and Tomie centipedes Tsukiko’s parents plan to offer their daughter up as a sacrifice to the Tomies, and Tsukiko’s dream was a representation of her fear about the Tomies.

Tomie does not want Tsukiko as a sacrifice, however, and attacks Kimiko before she can stab her daughter. Tsukiko runs upstairs and encounters Toshio and Yoshie who tell her that they are mortified by their friendship with her in her dream, and in real life they always hated her and thought she was annoying. Hurt, Tsukiko pushes them down the stairs and they are both attacked by the centipedes. Tsukiko then encounters a huge giant Tomie head in her living room, and after a brief conversation, the “sisters” reconcile, and the Tomie centipedes begin crawling over her.

The movie ends has Tsukiko is shown walking out of the house, having become another Tomie. As she walks through the streets of Japan, she observes other women she passes by, many of them also being Tomies. She walks up to a man, smiling, and is then shown being murdered by him in an apartment. Lying on the floor, she looks at a mirror, retaining some degree of her original personality. However, the reflection she sees in the mirror is of Tomie, resembling the way she did in Tsukiko’s dream when she was Tsukiko’s sister, who asks Tsukiko if she is happy. In response, Tsukiko laughs sadistically before her original personality dies and is replaced with that of another Tomie.

=== Future ===
In July 2019, Alexandre Aja was announced to be developing a web television series adaptation of Tomie for Quibi, in conjunction with Sony Pictures Television and Universal Content Productions, with David Leslie Johnson-McGoldrick serving as writer and executive producer, with Hiroki Shirota on board as co-producer. The fate of this planned series is unknown, as Quibi shut down in late 2020.

== Cast and characters ==
List indicators
- This table shows the characters and the actors who have portrayed them throughout the franchise.
- A dark grey cell indicates the character was not in the film, or that the character's presence in the film has not yet been announced.
- A ^{Y} indicates an appearance as a younger version of a pre-existing character.
- A ^{P} indicates a photographic appearance only.
- A ^{V} indicates a vocal appearance only.

Characters	Films											Junji Ito Collection: OVA – Tomie
Characters	Tomie	Tomie: Another Face	Tomie: Replay	Tomie: Re-birth		Tomie: The Final Chapter – Forbidden Fruit	Tomie: Beginning	Tomie: Revenge	Tomie vs. Tomie		Tomie Unlimited	Junji Ito Collection: OVA – Tomie
Characters	1998	1999	2000	2001		2002	2005		2007		2011	2018
Main Characters
Tomie Kawakami	Miho Kanno	Runa Nagai	Mai Hōshō	Miki Sakai	Miki Sakai	Nozomi Andô	Rio Matsumoto	Anri Ban	Yû Abiru	Emiko Matsuoka	Miu Nakamura (Note: In Tomie Unlimited, Tsukiko (as Tomie) is shown walking through the streets of Japan, with most of the women she passes by also being Tomie, with all previous Tomie actresses reprising their roles.)	Rie Suegara^{V}
Tomie Kawakami	Mami Nakamura	Miho Kanno^{P}	Miho Kanno^{P}	Kumiko Endô	Mia Murano	Nozomi Andô	Rio Matsumoto	Anri Ban	Chika Arakawa^{Y}	Natsuki Kasa^{Y}	Moe Arai	Monica Rial^{V}
Tsukiko Izumisawa	Mami Nakamura										Moe Arai	
Takeshi Yamamoto	Kenji Mizuhashi						Kenji Mizuhashi					Uncredited
Takashi Takeshi		Mitsuaki Kaneko	Masatoshi Matsuo									
Tomoko Hosoda				Yutaka Nakajima	Yutaka Nakajima	Chiaki Ota						
Tomie Hashimoto						Aoi Miyazaki						
Kazuhiko Hashimoto						Jun Kunimura Ryota Saito^{Y}						
Naoko Ikeno							Yuka Iwasaki		Yû Abiru Chika Arakawa^{Y}	Yû Abiru Chika Arakawa^{Y}		
Reiko Matsuhara							Asami Imajuku					Uncredited
Satoru Takagi							Yoshiyuki Morishita					Uncredited
Kazue Kae								Hisako Shirata			Aika Ota	
Humans
Dr. Hosono	Yoriko Douguchi											
Detective Harada	Tomorowo Taguchi											
Yuuichi Saiga	Kôta Kusano											
Kaori	Rumi											
Ota		Akira Shirai										
Miki		Chie Tanaka										
Yumi Morita			Sayaka Yamaguchi									
Fumihito Sato			Yosuke Kubozuka									
Dr. Tachibana			Kenichi Endo									
Atsuko Kinoshita			Makoto Togashi									
Sayuri's Father			Moro Morooka									
Sayuri's Mother			Yoshiko Yura									
Yoko Morita			Kumija Kim									
Kenzo Morita			Shun Sugata									
Receptionist			Kadu Koide									
Takumi Aoyama				Satoshi Tsumabuki	Satoshi Tsumabuki							
Shun'ichi Hosoda				Masaya Kikawada	Masaya Kikawada							
Hitomi Kitamura				Kumiko Endô	Kumiko Endô							
Hideo Kamata				Shugo Oshinari	Shugo Oshinari							
Masaru				Shin Kusaka	Shin Kusaka							
Rie Aoyama				Mia Murano	Mia Murano							
Waiter				Akira Yasuda	Akira Yasuda							
Yutaka				Shunsuke Ito	Shunsuke Ito							
Yumiko Sano				Yuri Hachisu	Yuri Hachisu							
Haruo Aoyoma				Taro Suwa	Taro Suwa							
Takako Aoyama				Ganko Fuyu	Ganko Fuyu							
Sachiko Kimata				Yoshie Otsuka	Yoshie Otsuka							
Norika				Masako Itou	Masako Itou							
Hiroaki				Hiroaki Muchima	Hiroaki Muchima							
Sawori				Emi Itou	Emi Itou							
Kyoko						Yuka Fujimoto						
Megumi						Ayaka Ninomiya						
Suzuki						Tetsu Watanabe						
Masao Tajima						Sora Toma						
Manager						Taijiro Tamura						
Inoue							Akifumi Miura					
Yoshino							Takashi Sugiuchi					
Yukiko Fuyuki								Minami				
Tetsuya Tanimura								Hitoshi Kato				
Inspector Yamazaki								Shoji Shibuya				
Inspector Toyama								Itsuko Suzuki				
Kazuki Umehara									Tōru Hachinohe	Tōru Hachinohe		
Toshio Shimoda											Kensuke Owada	
Masashishi Iizuka											Kouichi Ohori	
Kimiko Iizuka											Maiko Kawakami	

Tomie is played by a different actress in each film, and the role is as coveted by Japanese actresses as both that of the Doctor and James Bond are in Britain. As such, this changing roster of faces has allowed for a range of interpretations and subtle shading to the part, the most popular being Miho Kanno and Miki Sakai. Miho Kanno was Junji Ito's own personal choice for the role; he apparently coached her in preparing for her audition, even suggesting she wear Tomie's trademark beauty mark under her left eye.

== Comparison with the source material ==
The films manage to recreate the atmosphere of the manga. Most of the stories occur during the dark of night for its sense of eeriness, and the films generally follow suit.

Tomie's sexuality in the films is more ambiguous. In the manga, Tomie's attitude towards other women seems to range between thinly veiled hostility and outright murderous rage, while the film incarnation is known to seduce women as well as men.
