= List of feature film series with nine entries =

This is a list of film series that have nine entries.

Key:

- (A) – Film series is 100% animated
- (a) – Film series is not 100% animated and has live action in a sequel or prequel
- (TV) – made-for-TV
- (V) – direct-to-video
- (*) – TV series attached

== A ==
- American Pie
  1. American Pie (1999)
  2. American Pie 2 (2001)
  3. American Wedding (2003)
  4. American Pie Presents: Band Camp (2005) (V) (spin-off)
  5. American Pie Presents: The Naked Mile (2006) (V) (spin-off)
  6. American Pie Presents: Beta House (2007) (V) (spin-off)
  7. American Pie Presents: The Book of Love (2009) (V) (spin-off)
  8. American Reunion (2012)
  9. American Pie Presents: Girls' Rules (2020) (V) (spin-off)
- Akado Suzunosuke **
  1. Suzunosuke Akado (1957)
  2. Suzunosuke Akado: The Moonlight Monster (1957)
  3. Suzunosuke Akado: Defeat the Demon-Faced Gang (1957)
  4. Suzunosuke Akado: The Vacuum Slash of Asuka (1957)
  5. Suzunosuke Akado: The Demon of the Tower of the New Moon (1957)
  6. Suzunosuke Akado: The One-Legged Demon (1957)
  7. Suzunosuke Akado: The Birdman with Three Eyes (1958)
  8. Suzunosuke Akado: The Terror of the Valley of Darkness (1958)
  9. Suzunosuke Akado: Defeat of the Skull Brigade (1958)
- Angel Guts (aka Tenshi no Harawata)
  1. Angel Guts: High School Co-Ed (1978)
  2. Angel Guts: Red Classroom (1979)
  3. Angel Guts: Nami (1979)
  4. Angel Guts: Red Porno (1981)
  5. Angel Guts: Rouge (1984)
  6. Angel Guts: Red Rope - "Until I Expire" (1987)
  7. Angel Guts: Red Vertigo (1988)
  8. Angel Guts: Red Lightning (1994)
  9. Angel Guts: Night is Falling Again (1994)

== B ==
- Bloodfist
  1. Bloodfist (1989)
  2. Bloodfist II (1990) (V)
  3. Bloodfist III: Forced to Fight (1992) (V)
  4. Bloodfist IV: Die Trying (1992) (V)
  5. Bloodfist V: Human Target (1994) (V)
  6. Bloodfist VI: Ground Zero (1995) (V)
  7. Bloodfist VII: Manhunt (1995) (V)
  8. Bloodfist VIII: Trained to Kill (1996) (V)
  9. Bloodfist 2050 (2005) (TV) (remake)
- Battles Without Honor and Humanity (aka Jingi Naki Tatakai)
  1. Battles Without Honor and Humanity (1973)
  2. Battles Without Honor and Humanity: Hiroshima Deathmatch (1973)
  3. Battles Without Honor and Humanity: Proxy War (1973)
  4. Battles Without Honor and Humanity: Police Tactics (1974)
  5. Battles Without Honor and Humanity: Final Episode (1974)
  6. New Battles Without Honor and Humanity (1974)
  7. New Battles Without Honor and Humanity: The Boss's Head (1975)
  8. New Battles Without Honor and Humanity: The Boss's Last Days (1976)
  9. Aftermath of Battles Without Honor and Humanity (1979)
- Beach Party
  1. Beach Party (1963)
  2. Muscle Beach Party (1964)
  3. Bikini Beach (1964)
  4. Pajama Party (1964)
  5. Beach Blanket Bingo (1965)
  6. Ski Party (1965)
  7. How to Stuff a Wild Bikini (1965)
  8. The Ghost in the Invisible Bikini (1966)
  9. Back to the Beach (1987)
- Bouif
  1. Le crime du Bouif (1922)
  2. La résurrection du Bouif (1922)
  3. Le filon du Bouif (1922)
  4. Son excellence le Bouif (1922)
  5. Le Bouif errant (1926)
  6. La fille du Bouif (1932)
  7. Le crime du Bouif (1933)
  8. Le Bouif chez les pur-sang (1935)
  9. Le crime du Bouif (1952)

== C ==
- Cannon Movie Tales
  1. Snow White (1987)
  2. Beauty and the Beast (1987)
  3. Hansel and Gretel (1988)
  4. Puss in Boots (1988)
  5. Red Riding Hood (1989)
  6. Rumpelstiltskin (1987)
  7. Sleeping Beauty (1987)
  8. The Frog Prince (1986)
  9. The Emperor's New Clothes (1987)
- Care Bears ******
  1. The Care Bears Movie (1985)
  2. Care Bears Movie II: A New Generation (1986)
  3. The Care Bears Adventure in Wonderland (1987)
  4. Care Bears: Journey to Joke-a-lot (2004) (V)
  5. The Care Bears' Big Wish Movie (2005) (V)
  6. Care Bears: Oopsy Does It! (2007)
  7. Care Bears: Share Bear Shines (2010) (V)
  8. Care Bears: To the Rescue (2010) (V)
  9. Care Bears: The Giving Festival (2010) (V)

== D ==
- Dracula (Hammer film series)
  1. Dracula (1958)
  2. The Brides of Dracula (1960)
  3. Dracula: Prince of Darkness (1966)
  4. Dracula Has Risen from the Grave (1968)
  5. Taste the Blood of Dracula (1969)
  6. Scars of Dracula (1970)
  7. Dracula AD 1972 (1972)
  8. The Satanic Rites of Dracula (1973)
  9. The Legend of the 7 Golden Vampires (1974)
- The Devil in Miss Jones
  1. The Devil in Miss Jones (1973)
  2. The Devil in Miss Jones 2 (1982) (V)
  3. The Devil in Miss Jones 3: A New Beginning (1986) (V)
  4. The Devil in Miss Jones 4: The Final Outrage (1986) (V)
  5. The Devil in Miss Jones II: The Devil's Agenda (1991) (V)
  6. The Devil in Miss Jones 5: The Inferno (1995) (V)
  7. The Devil in Miss Jones 6 (1999) (V)
  8. The New Devil in Miss Jones (2005) (V) (remake)
  9. The Devil in Miss Jones: The Resurrection (2010) (V) (remake)
- Detective Tex
  1. Circumstantial Evidence (1920)
  2. The Wall Street Mystery (1920)
  3. The Bromley Case (1920)
  4. The Trail of the Cigarette (1920)
  5. The Unseen Witness (1920)
  6. The Scrap of Paper (1920)
  7. The Sacred Ruby (1920)
  8. The Triple Clue (1920)
  9. The House of Mystery (1921)
- Digimon Adventure (A) ***
  1. Digimon Adventure: Our War Game! (2000)
  2. Digimon Adventure 02: Digimon Hurricane Touchdown!!/Supreme Evolution! The Golden Digimentals(2000)
  3. Digimon Adventure tri.: Reunion (2015)
  4. Digimon Adventure tri.: Determination (2016)
  5. Digimon Adventure tri.: Confession (2016)
  6. Digimon Adventure tri.: Loss (2017)
  7. Digimon Adventure tri.: Coexistence (2017)
  8. Digimon Adventure tri.: Future (2018)
  9. Digimon Adventure: Last Evolution Kizuna (2020)
- Dot (A)
  1. Dot and the Kangaroo (1977)
  2. Around the World with Dot (1981)
  3. Dot and the Bunny (1984)
  4. Dot and the Koala (1985)
  5. Dot and Keeto (1986)
  6. Dot and the Whale (1986)
  7. Dot and the Smugglers (1987)
  8. Dot Goes to Hollywood (1987)
  9. Dot in Space (1994)

== E ==
- Eskimo Limon
  1. Eskimo Limon (1978)
  2. Eskimo Limon 2: Yotzim Kavua (1979)
  3. Eskimo Limon 3: Shifshuf Naim (1981)
  4. Eskimo Limon 4: Sapiches (1982)
  5. Eskimo Limon 5: Roman Za'ir (1984)
  6. Eskimo Limon 6: Harimu Ogen (1985)
  7. Eskimo Limon 7: Ahava Tzeira (1987)
  8. Eskimo Limon 8: Summertime Blues (1988)
  9. Eskimo Limon 9: The Party Goes On (2001)
- Ernest P. Worrell *
  1. Ernest Goes to Camp (1987)
  2. Ernest Saves Christmas (1988)
  3. Ernest Goes to Jail (1990)
  4. Ernest Scared Stupid (1991)
  5. Ernest Rides Again (1993)
  6. Ernest Goes to School (1994) (V)
  7. Slam Dunk Ernest (1995) (V)
  8. Ernest Goes to Africa (1997) (V)
  9. Ernest in the Army (1998) (V)

== H ==
- Hababam Sınıfı
  1. Hababam Sınıfı (1975)
  2. The Chaos Class Failed the Class (1975)
  3. The Chaos Class is Waking Up (1976)
  4. The Chaos Class is on Vacation (1977)
  5. The Chaos Class is Fretting Over (1978)
  6. The Chaos Class: Bye Bye (1981)
  7. The Class of Chaos Goes Abroad (2004)
  8. The Chaos Class in the Military (2005)
  9. The Class of Chaos 3,5 (2005)
- Hart to Hart *
  1. Hart to Hart (1979) (TV) (Pilot of the TV series)
  2. Hart to Hart Returns (1993) (TV)
  3. Hart to Hart: Home Is Where the Hart Is (1994) (TV)
  4. Hart to Hart: Crimes of the Hart (1994) (TV)
  5. Hart to Hart: Old Friends Never Die (1994) (TV)
  6. Hart to Hart: Secrets of the Hart (1995) (TV)
  7. Hart to Hart: Two Harts in 3/4 Time (1995) (TV)
  8. Hart to Hart: Harts in High Season (1996) (TV)
  9. Hart to Hart: Till Death Do Us Hart (1996) (TV)
- Higgins Family
  1. The Higgins Family (1938)
  2. My Wife's Relatives (1939)
  3. Should Husbands Work? (1939)
  4. The Covered Trailer (1939)
  5. Money to Burn (1939)
  6. Grandpa Goes to Town (1940)
  7. Earl of Puddlestone (1940)
  8. Meet the Missus (1940)
  9. Petticoat Politics (1941)

== I ==
- Wong⁴ gaa¹ si¹ ze
  1. Yes, Madam (1985)
  2. Royal Warriors (1986)
  3. In the Line of Duty 3 (1988)
  4. In the Line of Duty 4: Witness (1989)
  5. Middle Man (1990)
  6. Forbidden Arsenal (1991)
  7. Sea Wolves (1991)
  8. Yes, Madam '92: A Serious Shock (1992)
  9. Yes Madam 5 (1996)

== J ==
- Jane Doe (TV)
  1. Jane Doe: Vanishing Act (2005) (TV)
  2. Jane Doe: Now You See It, Now You Don't (2005) (TV)
  3. Jane Doe: Til Death Do Us Part (2005) (TV)
  4. Jane Doe: The Wrong Face (2005) (TV)
  5. Jane Doe: Yes, I Remember It Well (2006)(TV)
  6. Jane Doe: The Harder They Fall (2006) (TV)
  7. Jane Doe: Ties That Bind (2007) (TV)
  8. Jane Doe: How To Fire Your Boss (2007) (TV)
  9. Jane Doe: Eye of the Beholder (2008) (TV)
- Jesse Stone (TV)
  1. Stone Cold (2005) (TV)
  2. Jesse Stone: Night Passage (2006) (TV)
  3. Jesse Stone: Death in Paradise (2006) (TV)
  4. Jesse Stone: Sea Change (2007) (TV)
  5. Jesse Stone: Thin Ice (2009) (TV)
  6. Jesse Stone: No Remorse (2010) (TV)
  7. Jesse Stone: Innocents Lost (2011) (TV)
  8. Jesse Stone: Benefit of the Doubt (2012) (TV)
  9. Jesse Stone: Lost in Paradise (2015) (TV)

== L ==
- Lego DC Super Heroes (A)
  1. Lego Batman: The Movie – DC Super Heroes Unite (2013) (V)
  2. Justice League vs. Bizarro League (2015) (V)
  3. Justice League: Attack of the Legion of Doom (2015) (V)
  4. Justice League: Cosmic Clash (2015) (V)
  5. Justice League: Gotham City Breakout (2016) (V)
  6. The Flash (2018) (V)
  7. Aquaman – Rage of Atlantis (2018) (V)
  8. Batman: Family Matters (2019) (V)
  9. Shazam!: Magic and Monsters (2020) (V)
- Lightnin' Bill Carson
  1. Lightnin' Bill Carson (1936)
  2. Lightning Carson Rides Again (1938)
  3. Six-Gun Trail (1938)
  4. Code of the Cactus (1939)
  5. Texas Wildcats (1939)
  6. Outlaws' Paradise (1939)
  7. Straight Shooter (1939)
  8. The Fighting Renegade (1939)
  9. Trigger Fingers (1939)

== M ==
- Mortal Kombat (a) ***
  1. Mortal Kombat: The Journey Begins (1995) (A) (V)
  2. Mortal Kombat (1995)
  3. Mortal Kombat Annihilation (1997)
  4. Mortal Kombat Legends: Scorpion's Revenge (2020) (A) (V)
  5. Mortal Kombat (2021) (reboot)
  6. Mortal Kombat Legends: Battle of the Realms (2021) (A) (V)
  7. Mortal Kombat Legends: Snow Blind (2022) (A) (V)
  8. Mortal Kombat Legends: Cage Match (2023) (A) (V)
  9. Mortal Kombat II (2026) (reboot)
- Macross ****
1. Macross: Do You Remember Love? (1984)
2. Macross II: The Movie (1993) (V)
3. Macross Plus: Movie Edition (1995) (V)
4. Macross 7 The Movie: The Galaxy Is Calling Me! (1995)
5. Macross Frontier: The False Songstress (2008)
6. Macross Frontier: The Wings of Farewell (2009)
7. Macross Fb7 Listen to My Song! (2012)
8. Macross Delta: Passionate Walküre (2018)
9. Macross Delta: Zettai Live!!!!!! (2021)
- Mr. Moto
1. Think Fast, Mr. Moto (1937)
2. Thank You, Mr. Moto (1937)
3. Mr. Moto's Gamble (a.k.a. Mr. Moto's Diary) (1938)
4. Mr. Moto Takes a Chance (1938)
5. Mysterious Mr. Moto (1938)
6. Mr. Moto's Last Warning (1939)
7. Mr. Moto in Danger Island (1939)
8. Mr. Moto Takes a Vacation (1939)
9. The Return of Mr. Moto (1965)

== O ==
- Osamu Tezuka's Star System **********
  1. One Million-Year Trip: Bander Book (1978) (TV)
  2. Undersea Super Train: Marine Express (1979) (TV)
  3. Fumoon (1980) (TV)
  4. Bremen 4: Angels in Hell (1981) (TV)
  5. A Time Slip of 10000 Years: Prime Rose (1983) (TV)
  6. Bagi, the Monster of Mighty Nature (1984) (TV)
  7. The Prince of Devil Island: The Three-Eyed One (1985) (TV)
  8. Galaxy Investigation 2100: Border Planet (1986) (TV)
  9. The Tezuka Osamu Story: I Am Son-goku (1989) (TV)

== P ==
- Puss in Boots (a)
  1. El Gato con Botas (1961)
  2. The Wonderful World of Puss 'n Boots (1969) (A) (V)
  3. The Three Musketeers in Boots (1972) (A) (V)
  4. Puss in Boots Travels Around the World (1976) (A) (V)
  5. Puss in Boots (1988)
  6. Puss in Boots (1999) (A) (V)
  7. The True History of Puss 'N Boots (2009) (A)
  8. Puss in Boots (2011) (A)
  9. Puss in Boots: The Last Wish (2022) (A)

== R ==
- Rocky
  1. Rocky (1976)
  2. Rocky II (1979)
  3. Rocky III (1982)
  4. Rocky IV (1985)
  5. Rocky V (1990)
  6. Rocky Balboa (2006)
  7. Creed (2015) (spin-off)
  8. Creed II (2018) (spin-off)
  9. Creed III (2023) (spin-off)
- The Rockford Files **
  1. The Rockford Files: Backlash of the Hunter (1974) (TV)
  2. The Rockford Files: I Still Love L.A. (1994) (TV)
  3. The Rockford Files: A Blessing in Disguise (1995) (TV)
  4. The Rockford Files: If The Frame Fits (1996) (TV)
  5. The Rockford Files: Godfather Knows Best (1996) (TV)
  6. The Rockford Files: Friends and Foul Play (a.k.a. Fieldtrip to a Funeral) (1996) (TV)
  7. The Rockford Files: Punishment and Crime (a.k.a. Night Fishing) (1996) (TV)
  8. The Rockford Files: Murder and Misdemeanors (1997) (TV)
  9. The Rockford Files: If it Bleeds... It Leads (1999) (TV)
- La risa en vacaciones
  1. La risa en vacaciones (1990)
  2. La risa en vacaciones 2 (1990)
  3. La risa en vacaciones 3 (1992) (TV)
  4. La risa en vacaciones 4 (1994) (TV)
  5. La risa en vacaciones 5 (1994) (TV)
  6. La risa en vacaciones 6 (1995) (TV)
  7. La super risa en vacaciones 8 (1996) (TV)
  8. No se puede con la risa (1998) (V)
  9. De ladito me da risa (1998) (V)

== S ==
- Sharknado
1. Sharknado (2013) (TV)
2. Sharknado 2: The Second One (2014) (TV)
3. Sharknado 3: Oh Hell No! (2015) (TV)
4. Lavalantula (2015) (TV) (spin-off)
5. Sharknado: The 4th Awakens (2016) (TV)
6. 2 Lava 2 Lantula! (2016) (TV) (spin-off)
7. Sharknado 5: Global Swarming (2017) (TV)
8. The Last Sharknado: It's About Time (2018) (TV)
9. 2025 Armageddon (2022) (V) (crossover)
- The Saint (RKO series)
1. The Saint in New York (1938)
2. The Saint Strikes Back (1939)
3. The Saint in London (1939)
4. The Saint's Double Trouble (1940)
5. The Saint Takes Over (1940)
6. The Saint in Palm Springs (1941)
7. The Saint's Vacation (1941)
8. The Saint Meets the Tiger (1943)
9. The Saint's Return (1953)
- Sūpā Jaiantsu
1. Super Giant (1957)
2. Super Giant Continues (1957)
3. Super Giant - The Mysterious Spacemen's Demonic Castle (1957)
4. Super Giant - Earth on the Verge of Destruction (1957)
5. Super Giant - The Artificial Satellite and the Destruction of Humanity (1957)
6. Super Giant - The Spaceship and the Clash of the Artificial Satellite (1958)
7. Super Giant - The Space Mutant Appears (1958)
8. Super Giant Continues - The Devil's Incarnation (1959)
9. Super Giant Continues - The Poison Moth Kingdom (1959)

== T ==
- The Texas Chainsaw Massacre
1. The Texas Chain Saw Massacre (1974)
2. The Texas Chainsaw Massacre 2 (1986)
3. Leatherface: The Texas Chainsaw Massacre III (1990)
4. Texas Chainsaw Massacre: The Next Generation (1994)
5. The Texas Chainsaw Massacre (2003) (remake)
6. The Texas Chainsaw Massacre: The Beginning (2006) (prequel)
7. Texas Chainsaw 3D (2013) (retcon)
8. Leatherface (2017) (retcon)
9. Texas Chainsaw Massacre (2022) (retcon)
- Transformers (a)
1. The Transformers: The Movie (1986) (A)
2. Transformers (2007)
3. Transformers: Revenge of the Fallen (2009)
4. Transformers: Dark of the Moon (2011)
5. Transformers: Age of Extinction (2014)
6. Transformers: The Last Knight (2017)
7. Bumblebee (2018) (prequel)
8. Transformers: Rise of the Beasts (2023) (prequel)
9. Transformers One (2024) (A)
- Torchy Blane
  1. Smart Blonde (1937)
  2. Fly-Away Baby (1937)
  3. The Adventurous Blonde (1937)
  4. Blondes at Work (1938)
  5. Torchy Blane in Panama (1938)
  6. Torchy Gets Her Man (1938)
  7. Torchy Blane in Chinatown (1939)
  8. Torchy Runs for Mayor (1939)
  9. Torchy Blane... Playing with Dynamite (1939)
- Tomie
  1. Tomie (1999)
  2. Tomie: Another Face (1999)
  3. Tomie: Replay (2000)
  4. Tomie: Re-birth (2001)
  5. Tomie: Forbidden Fruit (2002)
  6. Tomie: Beginning (2005)
  7. Tomie: Revenge (2005)
  8. Tomie vs Tomie (2007)
  9. Tomie Unlimited (2011)

== U ==
- Ursus *
  1. Ursus (1961)
  2. La Vendetta di Ursus (The Revenge of Ursus) (1961)
  3. Ursus nella valle dei leoni (Ursus in the Valley of the Lions) (1961)
  4. Ursus e la regazza tartara (Ursus and the Tartar Girl) (1962)
  5. Ursus nella terra di fuoco (Ursus in the Land of Fire) (1963)
  6. Ursus il gladiatore rebelle (Ursus The Rebel Gladiator) (1963)
  7. Ursus il terrore dei kirghisi (Ursus, the Terror of the Kirghiz) (1964)
  8. Gli Invincibili Tre (The Invincible Three) (1964)
  9. Ercole, Sansone, Maciste e Ursus gli invincible (Hercules, Samson, Maciste and Ursus: the Invincibles) (1964)

== V ==
- View Askewniverse *
  1. Clerks (1994)
  2. Mallrats (1995)
  3. Chasing Amy (1997)
  4. Dogma (1999)
  5. Jay and Silent Bob Strike Back (2001)
  6. Clerks II (2006)
  7. Jay & Silent Bob's Super Groovy Cartoon Movie! (2013)
  8. Jay and Silent Bob Reboot (2019)
  9. Clerks III (2022)

== W ==
- Wallander (1994 series)
  1. Faceless Killers (a.k.a. Mördare utan ansikte) (1994)
  2. The Dogs of Riga (a.k.a. Hundarna i Riga) (1995)
  3. The White Lioness (a.k.a. Den Vita lejoninnan) (1996)
  4. Sidetracked (a.k.a. Villospår) (2001)
  5. The Fifth Woman (a.k.a. Den 5e kvinnan) (2002)
  6. The Man Who Smiled (a.k.a. Mannen som log) (2003)
  7. One Step Behind (a.k.a. Steget efter) (2005)
  8. Firewall (a.k.a. Brandvägg) (2006)
  9. The Pyramid (a.k.a. Pyramiden) (2007) (V)
