= List of Japanese films of 1998 =

== Highest-grossing films ==
Rank	Title	Gross
1	Bayside Shakedown	¥5.00 billion
2	Pokémon: The First Movie	¥4.15 billion
3	Doraemon: Nobita's Great Adventure in the South Seas	¥2.10 billion

== List of films ==
A list of films released in Japan in 1998 (see 1998 in film).

Japanese films released in 1998
Title	Director	Cast	Genre	Notes
A	Tatsuya Mori		Documentary	About Aum Shinrikyo cult
After Life	Hirokazu Koreeda	Arata, Erika Oda, Susumu Terajima	Fantasy	
Andromedia	Takashi Miike	Hiroko Shimabukuro, Eriko Imai, Takako Uehara		
April Story	Shunji Iwai	Takako Matsu, Tanabe Seiichi	Drama	
Begging for Love	Hideyuki Hirayama	Mieko Harada, Maho Nonami, Kiichi Nakai	Drama	
Beru • Epokku	Joji Matsuoka	Hikaari Ishida, Kyōka Suzuki, Isako Washio	—N/a	
The Bird People in China	Takashi Miike	Masahiro Motoki, Renji Ishibashi, Mako	—N/a	
Blues Harp	Takashi Miike	Hiroyuki Ikeuchi, Seiichi Tanabe, Saori Sekino	—N/a	
Bullet Ballet	Shinya Tsukamoto	Shinya Tsukamoto, Hisashi Igawa	—N/a	
Case Closed: The Fourteenth Target	Kanetsugu Kodama		—N/a	Animated film
Crayon Shin-chan: Blitzkrieg! Pig's Hoof's Secret Mission	Keiichi Hara		—N/a	Animated film
Doraemon: Nobita's Great Adventure in the South Seas	Tsutomu Shibayama		—N/a	Animated film
The Doraemons ⋆ The Great Springing Inspections Military Operation	Yoshitomo Yonetani		—N/a	Animated short
Dr. Akagi	Shōhei Imamura	Akira Emoto, Kumiko Asō	Comedy drama	Japanese-French co-production
Flowers of Shanghai	Hou Hsiao-hsien	Tony Leung Chiu-wai, Annie Yi, Michiko Hada	Drama	Japanese-Taiwanese co-production
The Geisha House	Kinji Fukasaku	Maki Miyamoto		
Kizuna	Kichitaro Negishi	Kōji Yakusho, Ken Watanabe, Yumi Asō	—N/a	
Love & Pop	Hideaki Anno			
Megaranger vs. Carranger	—N/a		—N/a	
Moon Light Dinner	Yutaka Ikejima	Kanae Mizuhara; Yumi Yoshiyuki	Pink	Best Film, Best Director, Best Screenplay, and Best New Actress - Pink Grand Prix
Odoru daisosasen – The Movie	Katsuyuki Motohiro	Yūji Oda, Toshirō Yanagiba, Eri Fukatsu	—N/a	
Ping Pong Hot Springs	Gen Yamakawa	Keiko Matsuzaka, Riho Akise, Satoshi Yamanaka	—N/a	
Pokémon: The First Movie	Kunihiko Yuyama			Animated film; first film based on the Pokémon franchise.
Rebirth of Mothra III	Okihiro Yoneda	Megumi Kobayashi, Misato Tate, Aki Flano	—N/a	
Return of Doraemon	Ayumu Watanabe		—N/a	Animated short
Ring	Hideo Nakata	Nanako Matsushima, Hiroyuki Sanada, Rikiya Ōtaka	Horror	
Sada	Nobuhiko Obayashi	Hitomi Kuroki, Tsurutaro Kataoka, Norihei Miki	Drama	
Shark Skin Man and Peach Hip Girl	Katsuhito Ishii	Tadanobu Asano, Sie Kohinata, Ittoku Kishibe	Action	
Spiral	Jōji Iida	Miki Nakatani, Hiroyuki Sanada, Kōichi Satō	Horror	
The Story of PuPu	Kensaku Watanabe	Sakura Uehara, Reiko Matsuo	Road movie	
Tokyo Eyes	Jean-Pierre Limosin	Shinji Takeda, Hinano Yoshikawa, Kaori Mizushima	Thriller, romance	French-Japanese co-production
Tomie	Ataru Oikawa	Mami Nakamura, Miho Kanno, Yoriko Doguchi	Horror	
Ultraman Tiga & Ultraman Dyna: Warriors of the Star of Light	—N/a			
Yomigaeru Yūsaku: Tantei Monogatari Tokubetsu-hen				

== See also ==
- 1998 in Japan
- 1998 in Japanese television
