= Junji Ito Maniac: Japanese Tales of the Macabre =

2023 original net animation series

- Key visual

伊藤潤二『マニアック』 (Itō Junji Maniakku)
- Created by: Junji Ito
- Original net animation
- Directed by: Shinobu Tagashira
- Written by: Kaoru Sawada
- Music by: Yuki Hayashi
- Studio: Studio Deen
- Licensed by: Netflix
- Released: January 19, 2023
- Runtime: 24-25 minutes
- Episodes: 12

Junji Ito Maniac: Japanese Tales of the Macabre (Japanese: 伊藤潤二『マニアック』, Hepburn: Itō Junji Maniakku) is a Japanese anthology horror original net animation (ONA) series produced by Studio Deen and directed by Shinobu Tagashira. It adapts various stories from Junji Ito, including The Hanging Balloons, Sōichi, and Tomie. It was released on Netflix in January 2023.

== Characters ==
Kazuya Hikizuri (引摺一也, Hikizuri Kazuya)
Voiced by: Takahiro Sakurai (Japanese); Jonah Scott (English)
Kinako (黄子)
Voiced by: Romi Park (Japanese); Karen Strassman (English)
Sayoko (小夜子)
Voiced by: Hisako Kanemoto (Japanese); Kira Buckland (English)
Chiemi (チエミ)
Voiced by: Yoko Hikasa (Japanese); Lauren Landa (English)
Kuriko (栗子)
Voiced by: Natsumi Takamori, Akeno Watanabe (adult) (Japanese); Reba Buhr, Dawn M. Bennett (adult) (English)
Shigorō (四五郎)
Voiced by: Hajime Iijima (Japanese); Brock Powell (English)
Narumi (成美)
Voiced by: Risa Shimizu (Japanese); Kayli Mills (English)
Hitoshi (ヒトシ)
Voiced by: Ayaka Asai (Japanese); Laura Stahl (English)
Misako (みさ子)
Voiced by: Tomoko Kaneda (Japanese); Corina Boettger (English)
Kazuko Morinaka (森中和子, Morinaka Kazuko)
Voiced by: Riho Sugiyama (Japanese); Courtney Lin (English)
Shinya Shiraishi (白石晋也, Shiraishi Shinya)
Voiced by: Daisuke Kishio (Japanese); Lucien Dodge (English)
Kagumi Fujino (藤野輝美, Fujino Kagumi)
Voiced by: Iori Nomizu (Japanese); Brianna Knickerbocker (English)
Tomie (富江)
Voiced by: Rie Suegara (Japanese); Monica Rial (English)
Tsukiko Izumisawa (泉沢月子, Izumisawa Tsukiko)
Voiced by: Yumiri Hanamori (Japanese); Abby Trott (English)
Yamazaki (山崎)
Voiced by: Taku Yashiro (Japanese); Brandon McInnis (English)
Tachi (太地)
Voiced by: Tomokazu Sugita (Japanese); Austin Lee Matthews (English)
Kimata (木股)
Voiced by: Hiroyuki Yoshino (Japanese); Tommy Arciniega (English)
Sōichi (双一)
Voiced by: Yūji Mitsuya (Japanese); Austin Tindle (English)
Kōichi (公一)
Voiced by: Yoshimasa Hosoya (Japanese); Ricco Fajardo (English)
Sayuri (さゆり)
Voiced by: Yuka Saitō (Japanese); Amber Lee Connors (English)
Tagaisu (互須)
Voiced by: Yutaka Aoyama (Japanese); Kirk Thornton (English)
Oshikiri (押切)
Voiced by: Hiro Shimono (Japanese); Micah Solusod (English)
Sonohara (園原)
Voiced by: Ryōtarō Okiayu (Japanese); Grant George (English)
Tomoki (友樹)
Voiced by: Sara Matsumoto (Japanese); Anjali Kunapaneni (English)
Ice Cream Man (アイスクリームマン, Aisu Kurīmu Man)
Voiced by: Takatsugu Chikamatsu (Japanese); Howard Wang (English)
Tsuyoshi Yoshikawa (吉川剛, Yoshikawa Tsuyoshi)
Voiced by: Ryōhei Kimura (Japanese); Alejandro Saab (English)
Kaoru Yoshikawa (吉川かおる, Yoshikawa Kaoru)
Voiced by: M.A.O (Japanese); Erica Mendez (English)
Izumi Murakami (村上泉, Murakami Izumi)
Voiced by: Aya Uchida (Japanese); Jenny Yokobori (English)
Gorō Shinozaki (白崎五郎, Shinozaki Gorō)
Voiced by: Yuki Kaji (Japanese); Sean Chiplock, Anjali Kunapaneni (young) (English)
Koko Shinozaki (白崎香子, Shinozaki Koko)
Voiced by: Tomoe Hanba (Japanese); Brianna Knickerbocker (English)
Rumi (留美)
Voiced by: Fumiko Orikasa (Japanese); Cristina Vee (English)
Shimada (島田)
Voiced by: Takashi Kondō (Japanese); Henry Mason (English)
Mayumi Santō (山東まゆみ, Santō Mayumi)
Voiced by: Shōko Nakagawa (Japanese); Emi Lo (English)
Mitsu Uchida (内田美津, Uchida Mitsu)
Voiced by: Mie Sonozaki (Japanese); Mela Lee (English)
Colon (コロン, Koron)
Voiced by: Tomoko Kaneda

== Production and release ==
The series was originally announced on June 8, 2022; the series was announced to adapt stories from Junji Ito's The Hanging Balloons, Sōichi, and Tomie manga. The series is directed by Shinobu Tagashira and produced by Studio Deen, with Kaoru Sawada writing the scripts and Yuki Hayashi composing the music, all of whom worked on the previous anthology series adapting Ito's works, Junji Ito Collection. The series premiered on Netflix on January 19, 2023. The opening theme song is "Paranoid" by MADKID, while the ending theme song is "Iu Toori" (云う透り) by Jyocho.

== Episodes ==
No.	Title	Directed by	Written by	Original release date
1	"The Strange Hikizuri Siblings"(The Bizarre Hikizuri Siblings: Séance); Transliteration: "Kaiki Hikizuri kyōdai: Kōreikai" (Japanese: 怪奇ひきずり兄弟・降霊会)	Shinobu Tagashira	Junji Ito & Kaoru Sawada	January 19, 2023
The six orphaned Hikizuri siblings host a strange seance after the eldest brother invites a woman interested in the supernatural, leading to a series of bizarre and unsettling events.
2	"The Story of the Mysterious Tunnel / Ice Cream Bus"(Tunnel Tale / Ice Cream Bus); Transliteration: "Tonneru kitan / Aisukurīmu basu" (Japanese: トンネル奇譚/アイスクリームバス)	Shinobu Tagashira	Junji Ito & Kaoru Sawada	January 19, 2023
In the first story, Goro returns to the ominous tunnel where his mother tragically died. In the second story, an eerie ice cream bus arrives playing music exclusively for children, concealing a chilling secret inside.
3	"Hanging Balloon"(The Hanging Balloons); Transliteration: "Kubitsuri kikyū" (Japanese: 首吊り気球)	Shinobu Tagashira	Junji Ito & Kaoru Sawada	January 19, 2023
Following the tragic suicide of a popular pop idol, gigantic floating balloons bearing the faces of town residents begin appearing in the sky, terrorizing everyone in their path.
4	"Four x Four Walls / The Sandman’s Lair"(Room of Fourfold Walls / Sleep Demon's Room); Transliteration: "Yonjū kabe no heya / Suima no heya" (Japanese: 四重壁の部屋/睡魔の部屋)	Shinobu Tagashira	Junji Ito & Kaoru Sawada	January 19, 2023
In the first story, Koichi tries to study in a specially built room to escape his troublesome brother Soichi. In the second story, Yuji becomes terrified of falling asleep because another version of himself tries to take over in his dreams.
5	"Intruder / Long Hair in the Attic"(The Intruder / Long Hair in the Attic); Transliteration: "Shin'nyūsha / Yaneura no nagai kami" (Japanese: 侵入者/屋根裏の長い髪)	Shinobu Tagashira	Junji Ito & Kaoru Sawada	January 19, 2023
In the first story, Oshikiri hears strange footsteps echoing through his empty home. In the second story, a young woman's tragic obsession with her long hair leads to a horrifying mystery after she is abruptly abandoned.
6	"Mold/Library Vision"(Mold / Phantom Estate); Transliteration: "Kabi/Zōsho gen'ei" (Japanese: 黴/蔵書幻影)	Shinobu Tagashira	Junji Ito & Kaoru Sawada	January 19, 2023
In the first story, a man returns from abroad to find his newly built house completely consumed by mysterious mold. In the second story, Goro develops an unnatural and obsessive fixation on the massive collection of books in a library.
7	"Tomb Town"(Town of Gravestones); Transliteration: "Bohyō no machi" (Japanese: 墓標の町)	Shinobu Tagashira	Junji Ito & Kaoru Sawada	January 19, 2023
Kaoru and her brother hit a young girl with their car while traveling to visit a friend, eventually discovering they have stumbled into a bizarre town where the deceased literally transform into gravestones.
8	"Layers of Terror/The Thing that Drifted Ashore"(Layers of Fear / Washed Ashore); Transliteration: "Kyōfu no jūsō / Hyōchakubutsu" (Japanese: 恐怖の重層/漂着物)	Shinobu Tagashira	Junji Ito & Kaoru Sawada	January 19, 2023
In the first story, a traffic accident reveals a shocking medical anomaly beneath the skin of a young girl. In the second story, a colossal mysterious creature washes up on a beach, revealing horrifying contents trapped inside.
9	"Tomie・Photo"(Tomie: Photograph); Transliteration: "Tomie: Shashin" (Japanese: 富江・写真)	Shinobu Tagashira	Junji Ito & Kaoru Sawada	January 19, 2023
Tsukiko takes secret photographs at school, but when she captures the mesmerizing and enigmatic Tomie Kawakami, a dark chain of eerie events and murderous jealousy is set into motion.
10	"Unendurable Labyrinth/The Bully"(Insufferable Maze / Bully Girl); Transliteration: "Taegatai meiro / Ijimekko" (Japanese: 耐えがたい迷路/いじめっ娘)	Shinobu Tagashira	Junji Ito & Kaoru Sawada	January 19, 2023
In the first story, a girl taking a hike to cheer up her reclusive friend gets lost and stumbles into a strange religious training camp. In the second story, a young girl's escalating spite toward a bothersome child leads to dark consequences.
11	"Alley / Headless Statue"(Back Alley / Sculpture Without a Head); Transliteration: "Rojiura / Kubi no nai chōkoku" (Japanese: 路地裏/首のない彫刻)	Shinobu Tagashira	Junji Ito & Kaoru Sawada	January 19, 2023
In the first story, a boarding house resident hears mysterious children playing from a sealed-off, walled alleyway. In the second story, an art teacher who sculpts headless figures is found murdered, leaving his students deeply unnerved.
12	"Whispering Woman / Soichi's Beloved Pet"(Whispering Woman / Souichi's Beloved Pet); Transliteration: "Mimikosuri suru onna / Sōichi no aigan dōbutsu" (Japanese: 耳擦りする女/双一の愛玩動物)	Shinobu Tagashira	Junji Ito & Kaoru Sawada	January 19, 2023
In the first story, a young woman who struggles to make decisions hires someone to constantly whisper instructions in her ear. In the second story, Soichi targets a kitten brought home by his sister, throwing the household into absolute chaos.
