= Tomie (film) =

- Film poster
- Directed by: Ataru Oikawa
- Written by: Ataru Oikawa
- Based on: Tomie by Junji Ito
- Produced by: Yasuhiko Azuma; Youichiro Onishi; Shun Shimizu
- Starring: Miho Kanno; Mami Nakamura; Yoriko Douguchi
- Cinematography: Akira Sakoh; Kazuhiro Suzuki
- Edited by: Ryūji Miyajima
- Music by: Hiroshi Futami; Toshihiro Kimura
- Production companies: Daiei Film; Art Port
- Distributed by: Art Port
- Release date: October 6, 1998 (Japan)
- Running time: 95 minutes
- Country: Japan

Tomie (Japanese: 富江) is a 1998 Japanese horror film directed by Ataru Oikawa. It is the first film in the Tomie film series, based on a manga of the same name by Junji Ito.

== Plot ==
In Japan, the police investigate the murder of high school girl Tomie Kawakami (Miho Kanno). They learn that in the months following the crime, nine students and one teacher have either committed suicide or gone insane. The detective (Tomoro Taguchi) assigned to the case learns that three years prior another Tomie Kawakami was murdered in rural Gifu prefecture. Other slain Tomie Kawakamis are discovered stretching all the way back to the 1860s, right when Japan began to modernize. The detective tracks down one of Tomie's classmates called Tsukiko Izumisawa (Mami Nakamura), an art student who is being treated for amnesia. She has absolutely no memory of the three-month period around Tomie's death, and is starting to suspect the cause has a supernatural source. Meanwhile, Tsukiko's neighbor is rearing a peculiar baby-like creature. Over the span of a couple weeks, it grows into a beautiful teenaged girl with orange eyes responding to the name of Tomie Kawakami.

Soon afterwards, Tomie begins seducing Tsukiko's boyfriend Yuuichi (Kouta Kusano). Meanwhile, Tsukiko enters her new neighbor's apartment to investigate. Upon discovering her friend's dead body, she is attacked by her landlord and passes out due to asphyxiation. She wakes up in her psychiatrist's office and encounters Tomie. Tomie starts emotionally taunting Tsukiko, taking unflattering selfies and pictures with and of her, and attempting to feed her live cockroaches. Soon thereafter, Yuuichi arrived on the scene and murders Tomie. As they go bury Tomie's headless body in the woods, she comes back to life and Tsukiko runs off further into the woods and finds herself on a boat dock. Tomie then appears once again, now fully regenerated, and kisses Tsukiko on the lips. They both begin laughing as Tsukiko lights a flare and sets Tomie on fire.

Tsukiko is now shown leading a normal life, still taking photographs and being interested in art. One day as she goes to develop a picture she took of herself, she notices a mole under her left eye she didn't have before; the same kind of mole Tomie had. Tsukiko then looks at herself in the mirror in shock as Tomie appears, smiling.

== Cast ==
- Mami Nakamura as Tsukiko Izumisawa
- Miho Kanno as Tomie Kawakami
- Yoriko Dōguchi as Dr. Hosono
- Tomorowo Taguchi as Detective Harada
- Kenji Mizuhashi as Takeshi Yamamoto
- Rumi as Kaori

== Production ==
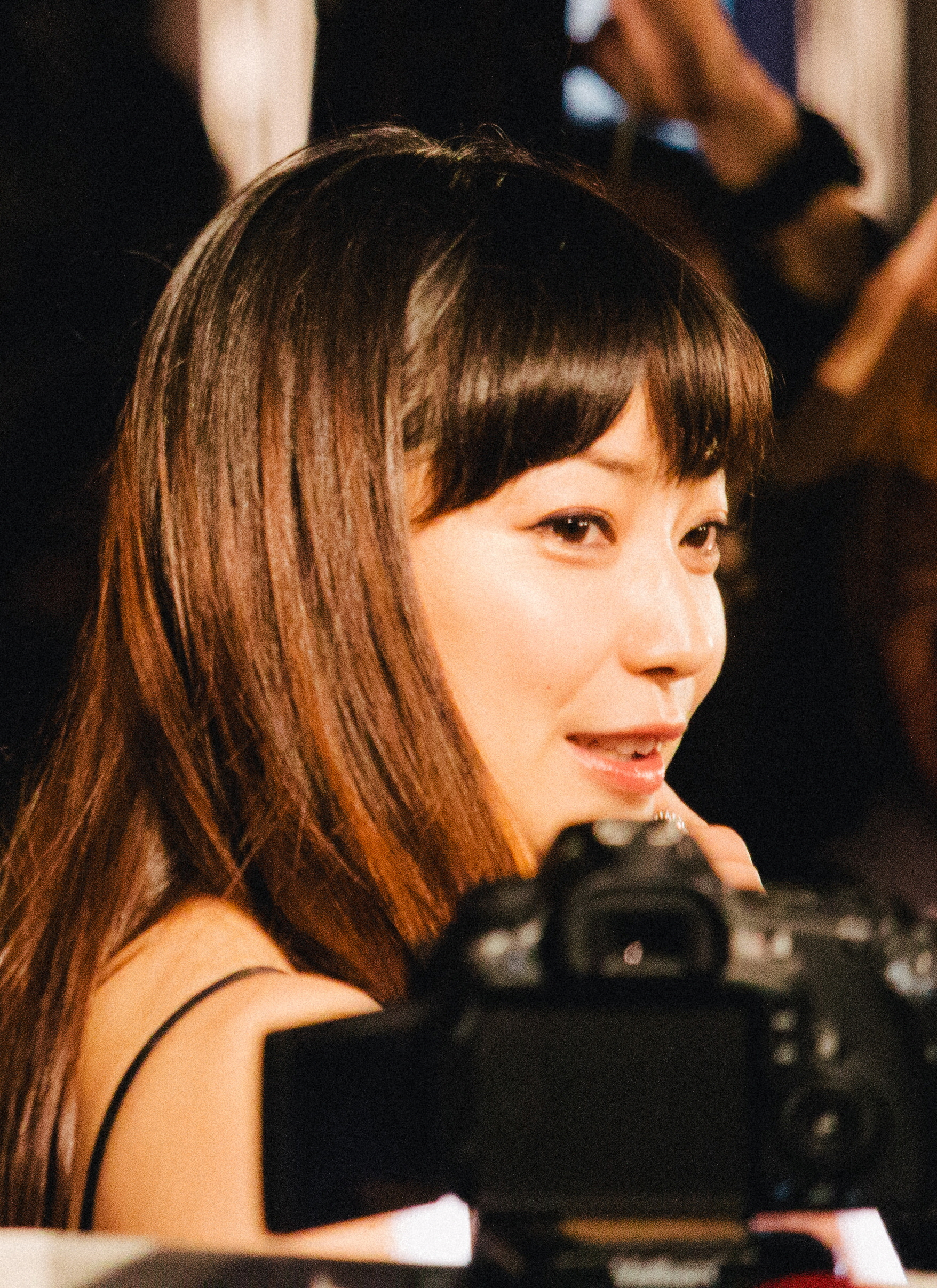
Miho Kanno was chosen specifically by manga author Junji Ito for the role.

Director and screenwriter Ataru Oikawa was an admirer of Junji Ito's original Tomie manga, describing it as a "fairy tale in bad taste". Rather than reproduce the manga's graphic violence directly, Oikawa sought to make the film more closely resemble a youth drama while retaining its supernatural elements.

Oikawa later recalled that Tomie was both his first manga adaptation and the first screen adaptation of Ito's work. He repeatedly sent versions of the screenplay to Ito for consultation, discussing details including the position of Tomie's distinctive beauty mark. Ito also recommended Miho Kanno for the title role.

The screenplay incorporates characters and situations from Ito's stories "Photograph" and "Kiss", while functioning partly as a continuation of events established in the manga. The film was photographed on Super 16 mm and subsequently blown up for theatrical exhibition.

== Release ==
Tomie was produced in 1998 and screened at the 1998 Tokyo International Fantastic Film Festival. It received its Japanese theatrical release on 6 March 1999, distributed by Daiei and Art Port.

== Home media ==
The film was released on DVD in North America on 3 February 2004.

In November 2024, Arrow Video released Tomie on Blu-ray in the United Kingdom and North America, marking the film's first Blu-ray release outside Japan. The edition featured a high-definition presentation with the original 5.1 and stereo audio, as well as new interviews with Oikawa, actress Mami Nakamura and producer Mikihiko Hirata.

== Reception ==
Video Watchdog gave the film a mixed assessment, praising its photography and Miho Kanno's performance as Tomie while considering the film comparatively mild and slow-paced.

Writing for Midnight Eye in 2001, Jasper Sharp placed Tomie within the wave of Japanese horror films that emerged in the late 1990s alongside Cure, Ring and Audition. He praised its screenplay, direction and characterisation, singling out Mami Nakamura's performance as Tsukiko, and described the film as an effective major-studio horror production.

== Sequels and legacy ==
Tomie launched a long-running live-action film franchise based on Junji Ito's manga. It was followed in 1999 by Tomie: Another Face, originally produced as a three-part television series and later compiled for home-video release. The next theatrical installment, Tomie: Replay, was released on 11 February 2000 as part of a double bill with Uzumaki, another adaptation of a work by Ito.

Further installments continued throughout the 2000s. Tomie: Beginning (2005) served as a prequel to the original film, with its ending leading into the events of Tomie. By 2011, the series had expanded through Tomie Unlimited, with the live-action franchise comprising multiple interpretations of the character by different filmmakers.

The success of the film series helped establish Tomie as one of Ito's most recognisable works outside manga; later commentary has noted that the property developed into one of Japan's longer-running horror film franchises.

== Notes ==
=== References ===
- Cooke, Bill. "Tomie". Video Watchdog. No. 115. p. 9. ISSN 1070-9991.
- Kalat, David (2007). J-horror: The Definitive Guide to The Ring, The Grudge and Beyond. Vertical. ISBN 978-1932234084.
- Mateo, Alex (August 30, 2024). "Live-Action Tomie Film Gets New Blu-ray Disc Release in West on November 19". Anime News Network. Archived from the original on August 30, 2024.
- "Tomie (1999)". AllMovie. Archived from the original on May 6, 2019.
