= Jyocho =

Japanese rock band

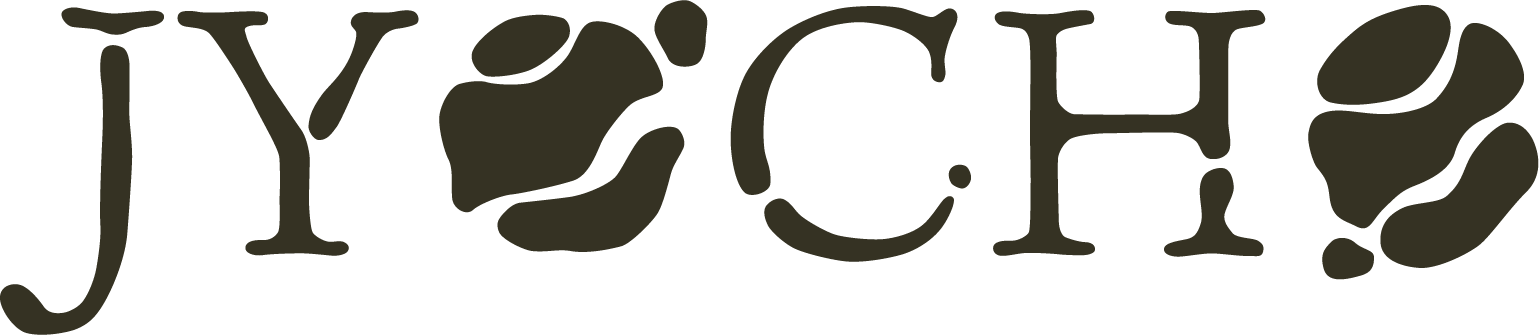

Background information
- Genres: Progressive rock; math rock
- Years active: 2016–present
- Label: Topshelf Records
- Members: Daijiro Nakagawa (vocals, guitar); Netako Nekota (vocals, keyboards); Yuuki Hayashi (flute); Kojiro Yamazaki (drums)
- Past members: Rionos (vocals); Sindee (bass); Hatch (drums)
- Website: jyocho.com

Jyocho (Japanese: じょうちょ, Hepburn: Jōcho; stylized in all capitals) is a Japanese progressive and math rock band.

== History ==
Following the disbandment of Daijiro Nakagawa's previous band Uchu Conbini, he initially began Jyocho as a solo project with support from other musicians. He eventually decided to work with them more closely and include them in a band. Nakagawa intended the group to have their debut performance in 2016 at the Canadian tour of Next Music from Tokyo, where he had previously appeared with Uchu Conbini. However, vocalist Rionos was unwilling to perform. The band eventually performed in October 2017 with the vocalist Nekota Netako.

In January 2023, the band's song "As the Gods Say" was featured as the opening theme of Junji Ito Maniac: Japanese Tales of the Macabre and appeared on an extended play (EP) of the same title. The song "Guide and Devote", from the EP of the same title, featured as the closing theme of the second season of Banished from the Hero's Party in January 2024.

In September 2024, the band announced the departure of the bassist Sindee.

== Reception ==
Akiho Minami, writing for Real Sound, described a 2019 live performance by the band as "intense" and at times akin to "madness". However, she appreciated the high level of technical proficiency displayed by the players, ultimately concluding that the band had a promising career ahead of them. The band's 2022 album Let's Promise to Be Happy was acclaimed by Anime News Network reviewer Nicholas Dupree, who appreciated Nakagawa's skill for guitar riffs as well as the overall "atmosphere" provided by the other performers. He also highlighted the record's "contemplative and melancholy" themes, commending the band's execution of the tone, which he described as "subtle but precise".

== Discography ==
=== Studio albums ===
- A Prayer in Vain (祈りでは届かない距離, Inoride wa todokanai kyori; 2016)
- Days in the Bluish House (碧い家で僕ら暮らす, Aoi ie de bokura kurasu; 2017)
- The Beautiful Cycle of Terminal (美しい終末サイクル, Utsukushii shuumatsu saikuru; 2018)
- Let's Promise to Be Happy (しあわせになるから、なろうよ, Shiawase ni naru kara, narouyo; 2022)
- Unforgettable Memories (忘れたくないこと, Wasuretakunai koto; 2026)

=== Extended plays ===
- A Parallel Universe (互いの宇宙, Tagai no uchuu; 2018)
- A Perfect Triangle, Rising Sun Human (綺麗な三角、朝日にんげん, Kireina sankaku, asahi ningen; 2019)
- As the Gods Say (云う透り, Iu toururi; 2023)
- Guide and Devote (導き、捧げて, Michibiki, sasagete; 2024)

=== Singles ===
- "Gather the Lights" (光あつめておいでよ, Hikari atsumete oideyo; 2021)
- "All the Same" (みんなおなじ, Minna onaji; 2021)
- "As the Gods Say" (Maniac ver.) (云う透り, Iu toururi; 2022)
- "Hijouni Kireina Jyocho" (2024)
- "Strong Body and Rich Future of Macho Minimal Fairy" (2024)
- "Lament the Passing of Spring" (2024)
