= Tomie: Re-birth =

2001 film by Takashi Shimizu

- Film poster
- Directed by: Takashi Shimizu
- Screenplay by: Yoshinobu Fujioka
- Based on: Tomie by Junji Ito
- Produced by: Tōru Ishii; Makoto Okada; Yoichiro Onishi; Shun Shimizu; Tsutomu Tsuchikawa
- Starring: Miki Sakai; Satoshi Tsumabuki; Masaya Kikawada; Shugo Oshinari
- Cinematography: Yoichi Shiga
- Edited by: Ryūji Miyajima
- Music by: Gary Ashiya
- Production companies: Daiei; Toei Video
- Distributed by: Daiei
- Release date: March 24, 2001 (Japan)
- Running time: 101 minutes
- Country: Japan
- Language: Japanese

Tomie: Re-birth (Japanese: 富江 re-birth) is a 2001 Japanese horror film directed by Takashi Shimizu as the third installment of the Tomie film series, based on a manga of the same name by Junji Ito. The film was released in Japan on March 24, 2001, and screened at the Manila Eiga Sai (Japanese Film Festival) in Philippines on September 3, 2005.

== Plot ==
An artist named Hideo is painting his girlfriend Tomie (Miki Sakai), but she dismisses it as a poor painting and he kills her in a jealous rage with an art knife. He gets his friends Shunsuke and Takumi to help him bury her. Later on, the three friends go to a party but see Tomie there; Hideo kills himself out of shock. Tomie latches onto Shunsuke only for his mother to kill her and they cut her up together in an unnatural ecstasy. They then burn her head, which has already started to regenerate and has some crude limbs for locomotion. Unbeknownst to them, they have not killed Tomie, as some of Tomie’s supernatural blood got on Hideo’s painting of her while he killed her, and the blood allows her to regenerate undetected. Takumi's girlfriend Hitomi gets possessed by another Tomie, in a rather viral fashion. The two Tomies become aware of each other and, in a jealous rage, the two Tomies try to eliminate the other.

Hitomi, however, is still awake despite being controlled mostly by Tomie. She doesn't want to become a monster, and so she decides to commit suicide. However, when at a waterfall, about to commit suicide, Tomie's head grows on the side of Hitomi's neck next to her head and forces her to stop. Takumi, meanwhile, gives his younger sister the portrait of Tomie, which still has some of her blood on it; after the two Tomies finally succeed in eliminating each other, as well as killing the others, Takumi's sister mourns for everyone lost and goes to the waterfall and throws flowers into it. A small facial mole can be seen directly beneath the sister's left eye, suggesting that, because Takumi gave her the portrait of Tomie, she was also possessed by her. Thus, the sister is the newest Tomie.

== Cast ==
- Miki Sakai as Tomie Kawakami
- Satoshi Tsumabuki as Takumi Aoyama
- Masaya Kikawada as Shunichi Hosoda
- Kumiko Endô as Hitomi Kitamura
- Shugo Oshinari as Hideo Kamata
- Shin Kusaka as Masaru
- Mia Murano as Rie Aoyama
- Akira Yasuda as Waiter
- Shunsuke Ito as Yutaka
- Yutaka Nakajima as Tomoko Hosoda
- Kumiko Endo as Hitomi Kitamura
- Yuri Hachisu as Yumiko Sano
- Taro Suwa as Haruo Aoyoma
- Ganko Fuyu as Takako Aoyama
- Yoshie Otsuka as Sachiko Kimata
- Masako Itou as Norika
- Hiroaki Muchima as Himself
- Emi Itou as Sawori

== Reception ==
Blogcritics made note of the film's slow pace, quiet sets, and lack of gore, and wrote that there even with its high body count, there appeared to be "a conscious effort to keep to decorum in the traditional sense of the word, which means to say even during a dismemberment there is still little to show for it except an artfully expanding pool of blood and Tomie’s severed head watching from a bowl." In admitting he lacked the cultural references, The reviewer felt that a viewer would "probably need to be a fan of the manga and the previous movies to get anything from this." He wrote he appreciated the slow pace of a creeping horror film having the ability to give him "the heebie-jeebies", but that the pacing in this film seemed pointless, the representation of a "pixie-cute girl with the tittering laugh" was annoying, and he did not understand the interactions between the players.

The horror reviewing website 10,000 Bullets made note of the various Tomie films using different actresses for the character of Tomie, but that only the villain's name was consistent in each of them. They appreciated that director Shimizu was able to inject his personal style "without ever losing sight of the character's roots." They noted that while Re-Birth is "more disgusting than scary", the cast performances are the best in the series so far, making special note of Miki Sakai's performance as Tomie and how her "unnerving laugh and haunting her eyes tell so much more than any dialog could." The noted that some of the imagery from Replay was brought over into Re-Birth, and that the film "starts off strong before metamorphosing into something that is so strange it almost parodies itself".

== Release ==
Tomie: Re-birth was released in Japan on March 24, 2001.

The film was released on DVD in an anamorphic widescreen format by Ventura in May 2004. DVD extras include trailers for films in the Tomie series, as well as interviews with the director and cast.
