= Rio Matsumoto =

Japanese actress, model and singer (born 1982)

- Born: October 22, 1982 (age 43)
- Occupations: Actress, model, singer, yoga instructor
- Years active: 1995–present
- Spouse: Unknown (m. 2019)
- Children: 1

Rio Matsumoto (松本 莉緒, Matsumoto Rio; born October 22, 1982) is a Japanese actress, model and singer. She has had a prolific career in television drama series since the mid-1990s and since 2003 has also been in several films. She was formerly known as Megumi Matsumoto (松本恵).

== Acting career ==
=== Television dramas ===
- Taiyō no Kisetsu (2002)
- Stand Up!! (2003), Shiho Tominaga
- Aim for the Ace! (2004), Reika Ryūzaki
- Tokyo Friends (2005), Hirono Hayama

=== Filmography ===
- Tomie: Beginning (2005), Tomie Kawakami
- Tokyo Friends: The Movie (2006), Hirono Hayama
- God's Puzzle (2008), Shiratori
- The Chasing World (2008), Riaru Onigokko
- Wangan Midnight: The Movie (2009), Reina Akikawa
- Love Strikes! (2011), Natsuki Komiyama
- Tomie: Unlimited (2011), Tomie (cameo)

== Music career ==
She released a single in 2004.
