= Tomie: Forbidden Fruit =

- Film poster
- Directed by: Shun Nakahara
- Screenplay by: Yoshinobu Fujioka
- Based on: Tomie by Junji Ito
- Produced by: Yasuhiko Higashi; Toru Shimizu
- Starring: Nozomi Andō; Aoi Miyazaki; Jun Kunimura
- Cinematography: Kazuhiro Suzuki
- Edited by: Ryūji Miyajima
- Distributed by: Daiei
- Release date: June 29, 2002 (Japan)
- Running time: 91 minutes
- Country: Japan
- Language: Japanese

Tomie: The Final Chapter – Forbidden Fruit (Japanese: 富江 ・最終章～禁断の果実～, Hepburn: Tomie: Saishuu-shō - Kindan no kajitsu) is a 2002 Japanese horror film directed by Shun Nakahara. It is the fourth installment of the Tomie film series, based on an eponymous manga by Junji Ito.

== Plot ==
Tomie Hashimoto is a dreamy teen who writes homoerotic horror fiction in which she imagines herself as Ann Bathory, a vampire. Introspective and lonely, she is picked on and bullied by her classmates at school, and lives alone with her loving, yet distant widower father, Kazuhiko Hashimoto. One day, while admiring an ornate jewel encrusted cross necklace in an antiquities shop, Tomie H. meets a strange, beautiful girl with a mole under her left eye. The mysterious stranger says her name is Tomie Kawakami. The girls become best friends (with heavy lesbian undertones) and Tomie H. dedicates the character of Mary from her fanfiction to her new friend, but it soon becomes clear that the two girls meeting each other was not purely accidental. Tomie K. has an agenda, and it involves Tomie H.'s father.

It is revealed Kazuhiko was involved in a relationship with Tomie K. many years ago which resulted in her being murdered. However, Kazuhiko was still obsessed with Tomie K. and even named his own daughter after her. Tomie K. is back to terrorize his family and tries to convince Kazuhiko to murder his daughter. Kazuhiko ends up murdering and decapitating Tomie K., and throws her head into a nearby river. Tomie H. discovers the talking head and nurses Tomie K. back to health as she regenerates. She spends a lot of time cooking and taking care of her but after a brief argument between the two, Tomie H. ends up throwing the regenerating Tomie K. off a building.

Soon afterwards, Tomie K. shows up at her front porch and Tomie H. shoots her with an arrow, killing her. She and her father freeze Tomie K. into a block of ice to prevent her from regenerating and coming back to life, but after hearing the frozen Tomie K.'s pleas and cries Kazuhiko breaks the block of ice and sets Tomie K. free. Tomie K. then attacks Tomie H., but gets hit in the head by her, which results in Kazuhiko locking his daughter into a freezer room. Tomie K. laughs as she and Kazuhiko walk away, holding hands. The next morning, Tomie H. is discovered by a worker from the ice sculpture company who saves her life.

Tomie H. is now shown living alone, with her father missing, albeit thankful because she believes he turned down the amount of cold in the room slightly to save her from Tomie K. She goes to her room and continues writing her fiction, finishing it with, "Ann and Mary are friends again; there will be no issues this time. Ann will raise her to be a real friend, a friend whom she can depend on."

Tomie H. then opens her desk drawer and looks at a dismembered, regenerating ear of Tomie K.'s.

== Cast ==
- Nozomi Andō as Tomie Kawakami
- Aoi Miyazaki as Tomie Hashimoto
- Jun Kunimura as Kazuhiko Hashimoto
  - Ryota Saito as Young Kazuhiko
- Tetsu Watanabe as Suzuki
- Taijiro Tamura as Manager
- Yuka Fujimoto as Kyoko
- Ayaka Ninomiya as Megumi
- Sora Toma as Masao Tajima
- Chiaki Ota as Tomoko Hosoda

== Release ==
Tomie: Forbidden Fruit was released in Japan on June 29, 2002.
