= List of Tomie chapters =

Tomie appeared as a serial in the manga magazine Monthly Halloween from 1987 to 2000. Two volumes were collected into the overarching series The Junji Ito Horror Comic Collection (伊藤潤二恐怖マンガCollection) as volume 1 and 2 of the series. The manga series was released in an omnibus volume in February 2000 titled, Tomie Zen (富江 (全)). ComicsOne released both volumes on April 1, 2001, with flipped artwork (read left-to-right).

A second series titled Atarashī Tomie (新しい富江, New Tomie) was serialized in Nemuki and was collected into a single bound volume titled Tomie Again: Tomie Part 3 (富江Again―富江 Part3) and released in March 2001. Tomie was re-released again as part of The Junji Ito Museum of Horror (伊藤潤二恐怖博物館) series. This version was also released in two volumes with the addition of the chapters originally released in Tomie Again. Dark Horse Comics released this version in its original right-to left format.

Asahi Sonorama re-released the manga again in two volumes as part of the Junji Ito Masterpiece Collection (伊藤潤二傑作集, Itō Junji Kessaku-shū) on January 20, 2011.

A new arc titled Tomie: Takeover was released exclusively with the DVD release of the Junji Ito Collection on March 30, 2018, April 27, 2018, and May 25, 2018.

== Volumes ==
=== Original release ===
The Junji Ito Horror Comic Collection

| No. | Title | Original release date | English release date |
|---|---|---|---|
| 1 | Tomie 1: The Junji Ito Horror Comic Collection 伊藤潤二恐怖マンガCollection 富江 | October 1997; 4257903139 | April 1, 2001; 1588990842 |
01.Tomie (富江); 02.Photograph (写真, Shashin); 03.Kiss (接吻, Seppun); 04.Mansion (屋敷, Yashiki); 05.Revenge (復讐, Fukushū); 06.The Basin of the Waterfall (滝壺, Takitsubo)
| 2 | Tomie 2: The Junji Ito Horror Comic Collection 伊藤潤二恐怖マンガCollection 富江 Part 2 | November 1997; 4257903147 | April 1, 2001; 1588990850 |
07.Tomie Part 2 (富江PART.2); 08.Basement (地下室, Chikashitsu); 09.Painter (画家, Gaka); 10.Murder (暗殺, Ansatsu); 11.Hair (毛髪, Mōhatsu); 12.Orphan Girl (養女, Yōjo)

Tomie Again

| No. | Release date | ISBN |
|---|---|---|
| 1 | March 2001 | 4257904305 |
01. Little Finger (小指, Koyubi); 02. Boy (少年, Shōnen); 03. Moromi (もろみ); 04. Babysitter (ベビーシッター, Bebīshittā); 05. Gathering (ある集団, Aru shūdan); 06. Passing Demon (通り魔, Tōrima); 07. Top Model (トップモデル, Toppu moderu); 08. Old and Ugly (老醜, Rō Miniku)

=== Re-release ===
| No. | Title | Original release date | English release date |
|---|---|---|---|
| 1 | Museum of Terror 1 伊藤潤二恐怖博物館 1 | May 2002; 4257721596 | July 26, 2006; 1-59307-542-1 |
01.Tomie (富江); 02.Tomie Part 2 (富江PART.2); 03.Basement (地下室); 04.Photograph (写真); 05.Kiss (接吻); 06.Mansion (屋敷); 07.Revenge (復讐); 08.The Basin of the Waterfall (滝壺); 09.Painter (画家)
| 2 | Museum of Terror 2 伊藤潤二恐怖博物館 2 | May 2002; 425772160X | September 6, 2006; 1-59307-612-6 |
10. Murder (暗殺); 11. Hair (毛髪); 12. Orphan Girl (養女); 13. Little Finger (小指); 14. Boy (少年); 15. Moromi (もろみ); 16. Babysitter (ベビーシッター); 17. Gathering (ある集団); 18. Passing Demon (通り魔); 19. Top Model (トップモデル); 20. Old and Ugly (老醜)
