= Miki Sakai =

Japanese actress and J-pop idol singer

- Born: Miki Sakai; February 21, 1978 (age 48); Aoi-ku, Shizuoka, Japan
- Occupations: Actress; singer
- Years active: 1991–present
- Notable credit: Hakusen Nagashi
- Children: 1

Miki Sakai (Sakai Miki, 酒井美紀), born 21 February 1978 in Aoi-ku, Shizuoka, Japan is an actress and J-pop idol singer.

As a teenager she made her feature film debut in the 1995 Shunji Iwai film Love Letter playing the role of Itsuki Fujii as a young girl. The film was a huge box-office success and Miki picked up a number of awards for her role including a Japanese Academy Award for 'Newcomer of the Year'.

She also starred in Hagusen nagashi (1996) on TV as well as in numerous other television series and movies. Miki's portrayal of the character Tomie in the 2001 horror movie Tomie: Re-birth was one of the more popular interpretations of the role.

In January 2008, Miki Sakai appeared in the 10-hour long TV historical drama Tokugawa Fūunroku Hachidai Shōgun Yoshimune.

== Personal life ==
On October 19, 2008, she married a doctor working at a university hospital who is four years older than her. In October 2009, she announced on her official blog that she was pregnant with her first child, and gave birth to her first son in 2010.

In 2019, while continuing her acting career, she announced that she had enrolled in a private graduate school in Tokyo. In March 2023, she reported that she had completed her master's degree in international cooperation studies at Toyo Eiwa University.

== Filmography ==
=== Film ===
- Love Letter (1995), young Itsuki Fujii
- Himeyuri no Tō (1995)
- Nagareita shichinin (1997)
- Abduction (1997), Mayo
- To Love (1997), Mitsu Morita
- Juvenile (2000), Noriko Kinoshita
- Tomie: Re-birth (2001), Tomie Kawakami
- Samayou Yaiba (2009), Wakako Kijima
- Kamen Rider OOO Wonderful: The Shogun and the 21 Core Medals (2011)
- Tomie: Unlimited (2011), Tomie (cameo)
- You Are Brilliant Like a Spica (2019)
- Talking the Pictures (2019)
- Akira and Akira (2022)
- Shinpei (2025), Ms. Kōda
- Mt. Fuji and Happiness Code (2025), Aya Ando

=== Television ===
- Hakusen Nagashi (1996), Sonoko Nanakura
- Hakusen Nagashi: Spring at Age 19 (1997), Sonoko Nanakura
- Hakusen Nagashi: The Wind at Age 20 (1999), Sonoko Nanakura
- Aoi Tokugawa Sandai (2000), Tokugawa Masako
- Hakusen Nagashi: The Poem of Travels (2001), Sonoko Nanakura
- Hakusen Nagashi: Age 25 (2003), Sonoko Nanakura
- Hakusen Nagashi: The Final – Even as the Times of Dreaming have Passed (2005), Sonoko Nanakura
- Life (2007), Masako Hiraoka
- Tokugawa Fūunroku Hachidai Shōgun Yoshimune (2008)
- Showa Genroku Rakugo Shinju (2018), Oei
- Because We Forget Everything (2022)

== Awards and nominations ==
| Year | Award | Category | Work(s) | Result | Ref. |
|---|---|---|---|---|---|
| 1996 | 19th Japan Academy Film Prize | Newcomer of the Year | Love Letter and Himeyuri no Tō | Won | |
| 1996 | 17th Yokohama Film Festival | Best New Talent | Love Letter | Won | |
| 1997 | 10th Nikkan Sports Film Award | Best Newcomer | Abduction, To Love and Nagareita shichinin | Won | |
| 1998 | 21st Japan Academy Film Prize | Best Supporting Actress | Abduction | Nominated | |
| 1999 | 23rd Elan d'or Awards | Newcomer of the Year | Herself | Won | |
