= Tomie: Revenge =

- Film poster
- Directed by: Ataru Oikawa
- Screenplay by: Ataru Oikawa
- Based on: Tomie by Junji Ito
- Produced by: Mikihiko Hirata
- Starring: Hisako Shirata; Minami Hinase; Anri Ban
- Cinematography: Ryu Segawa
- Edited by: Izumi Ishida
- Music by: Masaki Miyoshi
- Production companies: Art Port; Nikkatsu
- Distributed by: Art Port
- Release date: April 16, 2005 (Japan)
- Running time: 72 minutes
- Country: Japan
- Language: Japanese

Tomie: Revenge (Japanese: 富江 REVENGE) is a 2005 Japanese horror film directed by Ataru Oikawa. It is the sixth installment of the Tomie film series, based on a manga of the same name by Junji Ito, more specifically the chapter Revenge.

== Plot ==
The story revolves around a young, female doctor, Kazue (Hisako Shirata), and an unidentified, naked and wounded woman (Anri Ban) she runs down on the road one night. The girl leads Kazue to an abandoned house filled with bodies, madmen and an unconscious girl. The unconscious girl, Yukiko (Minami) is near death and wrapped in a sleeping bag. Kazue takes Yukiko back to her clinic.

One year later, a federal investigator visits Kazue, having found out about her meeting the naked and wounded woman. He explains that the woman, named Tomie, cannot die and murders happen all around her due to her beauty causing insanity. Tomie, meanwhile, is beginning a ritual revenge plan.

== Cast ==
- Hisako Shirata as Kazue Kae
- Minami Hinase as Yukiko Fuyuki
- Anri Ban as Tomie Kawakami
- Hitoshi Kato as Tetsuya Tanimura
- Shoji Shibuya as Inspector Yamazaki
- Itsuko Suzuki as Inspector Toyama
