= Tomie: Beginning =

- Film poster
- Directed by: Ataru Oikawa
- Screenplay by: Ataru Oikawa
- Based on: Tomie by Junji Ito
- Produced by: Mikihiko Hirata
- Starring: Rio Matsumoto; Asami Imajuku; Kenji Mizuhashi
- Cinematography: Ryu Segawa
- Edited by: Etsuko Kimura
- Music by: Masaki Miyoshi
- Production companies: Art Port; Nikkatsu
- Distributed by: Art Port
- Release date: April 9, 2005 (Japan)
- Running time: 74 minutes
- Country: Japan
- Language: Japanese

Tomie: Beginning (Japanese: 富江 BEGINNING) is a 2005 Japanese horror film directed by Ataru Oikawa and the fifth installment of the Tomie film series, serving as a direct prequel to the 1998 film Tomie, with Kenji Mizuhashi reprising his role as Kenichi Yamamoto.

== Plot ==
This installment deals with the chain of events that occurred right before the first film takes place: when Tomie Kawakami (Rio Matsumoto) shows up as a transfer student at a high school, many boys in the class, including the teacher Satoru Takagi, develop crushes on her, raising the ire of most of the girls in the class, which causes them to alienate Tomie. However, lone girl Reiko Matsuhara alone is intrigued by Tomie and befriends her. Three girls in particular begin to bully Tomie, which Reiko witnesses. Reiko learns that Tomie dislikes all boys and considers them to all be the same, adding that most try to harm her after falling in love with her, intriguing Reiko even more; Reiko and Tomie share many secrets and Reiko eventually talks to Tomie about the bullying that she faces, with Tomie promising that she always gets total revenge on those who bully her. After one of Tomie's main bullies is nearly killed by her crush at Tomie's command, Tomie kidnaps her two lackeys as well and feeds them worms and cockroaches, psychologically traumatizing them.

Reiko reflects that in the time after that, Tomie "took over the class", with the boys becoming antisocial and zombilike and the girls falling into a state of depression— except for Reiko, who begins to doubt that her friend is human. Tomie attempts to seduce the teacher Mr. Takagi, but Kenichi Yamamoto walks in on them and breaks them up, insulting Tomie and accusing her of cheating on him. Yamamoto's best friend, Inoue from the photo club, and two other boys from the class chase Reiko and Tomie as they walk home that night, attempting to kill Tomie. Reiko protects Tomie, but ultimately the boys end up cutting off one of Tomie's ears, however they retreat when Tomie reveals their identities. Reiko sees Tomie's severed ear grow small limbs and crawl away.

Tomie refuses to let Reiko take her to the hospital for her injury, so instead Reiko takes Tomie home and wraps up her injury. However, when Reiko takes off the bandage to place a new one on, she finds that Tomie's ear has completely regenerated. Tomie reveals to Reiko her inhuman status and explains why only Reiko interested her, promising to show her "what hell is really like" before leaving. That night, Reiko is confronted by another Tomie who grows from the blood on her uniform, and takes notice of her.

Years later, Yamamoto and Reiko are the only ones who attend the class reunion. Yamamoto allows Reiko to tell him about what her friendship with Tomie was like, but Reiko refuses to talk about what the Tomie grown from the blood on her uniform did to her. Yamamoto reveals that he only came to the reunion in order to find out more about how he could find Tomie again, and finds a heart of Tomie's in Reiko's bag. When Reiko refuses to give him the heart, he kills her, and runs off with the heart as it begins to regenerate. However, Reiko comes back to life— revealing that Tomie turned Reiko into another clone of her. Tomie chastises Yamamoto for being so stupid and says that she will always return. However, as she begins to leave, Mr. Takagi returns and kills Tomie, pledging that he will do whatever it takes to kill her permanently.

== Cast ==
- Rio Matsumoto as Tomie Kawakami
- Asami Imajuku as Reiko Matsuhara
- Kenji Mizuhashi as Kenichi Yamamoto
- Akifumi Miura as Inoue
- Yoshiyuki Morishita as Satoru Takagi
- Takashi Sugiuchi as Yoshino
- Yuka Iwasaki as Naoko Ikeno
