= Asami Imajuku =

Japanese fashion model, actress, and singer (born 1978)

- Born: January 7, 1978 (age 48); Miyazaki Prefecture, Japan

Asami Imajuku (今宿麻美) is a Japanese fashion model, actress, and singer, born in Miyazaki Prefecture.

== Filmography ==
- Blue (blue) (2002) as Meiko Nakano
- Kageuta (陰詩) (2003)
- Nine Souls (2003)
- Tomie: Beginning (富江 BEGINNING) (2005) as Reiko Matsuhara
- Hanging Garden (空中庭園) (2005) as Sacchin
- FLOWERS (2005)
- Sleeping Flower (2005)
- Colors (2006)
- Love My Life (2006) as Eri Joujima
- Life (2006)
- Tana no sumi (棚の隅) (2006)
- Baumkuchen (2006)

== Discography ==
A work of the IMAJUKU name
Singles

- Feel Like Makin'(1999)
- Chedi EP(1999)
- PARADISE(1999)

Albums

- ibiza(1999)
- “cat's cradle”～imajuku remix(1999)
- imajuku cafe(2001)

A work of the Asami Imajuku name

- Compilation album "Wild Flowers"(2001)
