= Tomie: Replay =

- Film poster
- Directed by: Tomijirō Mitsuishi
- Screenplay by: Satoru Tamaki
- Based on: Tomie by Junji Ito
- Produced by: Yasuhiko Higashi; Yasuyo Ogisu; Shun Shimizu
- Starring: Sayaka Yamaguchi; Mai Hōshō; Yōsuke Kubozuka
- Cinematography: Hideo Yamamoto
- Edited by: Ryūji Miyajima
- Music by: Kōji Endō
- Production company: Daiei Film
- Distributed by: Daiei Film
- Release date: February 11, 2000 (Japan)
- Running time: 95 minutes
- Country: Japan
- Language: Japanese

Tomie: Replay (Japanese: 富江 replay) is a 2000 Japanese horror film directed by Tomijirō Mitsuishi. It is the second installment of the Tomie film series, based on a manga of the same name by Junji Ito, specifically the Basement chapter.

== Plot ==
The film begins with a six-year-old girl being rushed into a hospital ER with an unusually distended stomach. Doctors begin to operate and find a disembodied head, alive and growing inside the girl's belly. The head introduces itself to the doctors as "Tomie". Tomie is placed in a tank of alkaline solution in the basement of the hospital for further observation. Soon after, all five of the hospital workers present during the operation mysteriously leave the hospital or disappear entirely, including hospital Director Morita.

Meanwhile, a few nights later, a man named Takeshi visits his friend Fumihito, who is recovering from some sort of ailment in his hospital room. While visiting, Takeshi is confronted by a naked Tomie, now fully grown and escaped from the basement, who asks him to get her out of there. Takeshi takes Tomie to his apartment, and leaves Fumihito by himself, with no explanation. Later, Fumihito calls Takeshi to find out why he left. Takeshi reacts very defensively and irrationally, telling Fumihito that "Tomie belongs to me," already under Tomie's evil and seductive influence.

The next morning, Yumi, Director Morita's daughter, visits the hospital in search of her father, missing since the operation. She meets Dr. Tachibana, the only doctor present during the young girl's operation who hasn't yet left the hospital. Tachibana gives Yumi a journal recently written by her father, and soon after giving it to her, he kills himself. Through the journal, we learn that during the operation, Director Morita and another doctor were accidentally infected with Tomie's blood and that through that blood, Tomie is regenerating within the doctors, taking over their bodies and driving them insane. Yumi reads in her father's journal about him wanting to kill a girl named "Tomie", and that he met one of these Tomie specimens. Later, Yumi and Fumihito meet at a party and realize they are both looking for a girl named "Tomie". They join forces to find out what happened to Yumi's father and Takeshi.

The next day, Yumi visits the family of the six-year-old girl who had had the operation. She learns that before that operation, the girl had received a kidney transplant from a girl named "Tomie". From this kidney, Tomie had begun to regenerate inside the girl's body. Meanwhile, Fumihito visits his friend Takeshi, who had gone mad after killing and decapitating Tomie in a fit of jealousy, then watching her come back to life, regenerating a new head. Takeshi soon after is committed to a mental hospital after he is discovered to have murdered Tomie, and Fumihito becomes Tomie's new prey.

That night Yumi has a short and strange run-in with her missing father, during which he babbles about needing to kill Tomie. The following day his dead body is discovered in the hospital basement, bloated and deformed. At his funeral Yumi receives a note from Tomie, asking to meet her that night at the hospital, seemingly for a final showdown.

Yumi arrives at the hospital to find Tomie there to taunt her, and Fumihito, now under Tomie's spell, is there apparently to kill her. At the last minute, Fumihito decides to kill Tomie instead, chopping off her head and burning the remains. Yumi and Fumihito leave the hospital in relief.

== Cast ==
- Sayaka Yamaguchi as Yumi Morita
- Mai Hōshō as Tomie Kawakami
- Yōsuke Kubozuka as Fumihito Sato
- Kenichi Endo as Dr. Tachibana
- Shun Sugata as Kenzo Morita
- Kumija Kim as Yoko Morita
- Makoto Togashi as Atsuko Kinoshita
- Moro Morooka as Sayuri's Father
- Yoshiko Yura as Sayuri's Mother
- Masatoshi Matsuo as Takashi Takeshi
- Kadu Koide as Receptionist

== Release ==
Tomie: Replay was released in Japan on February 11, 2000 on a double bill with Uzumaki. Based on grosses from Japan's nine key cities, the films opened in 14th place for the week.
