= Minami (actress) =

Japanese actress (born 1986)

- 美波
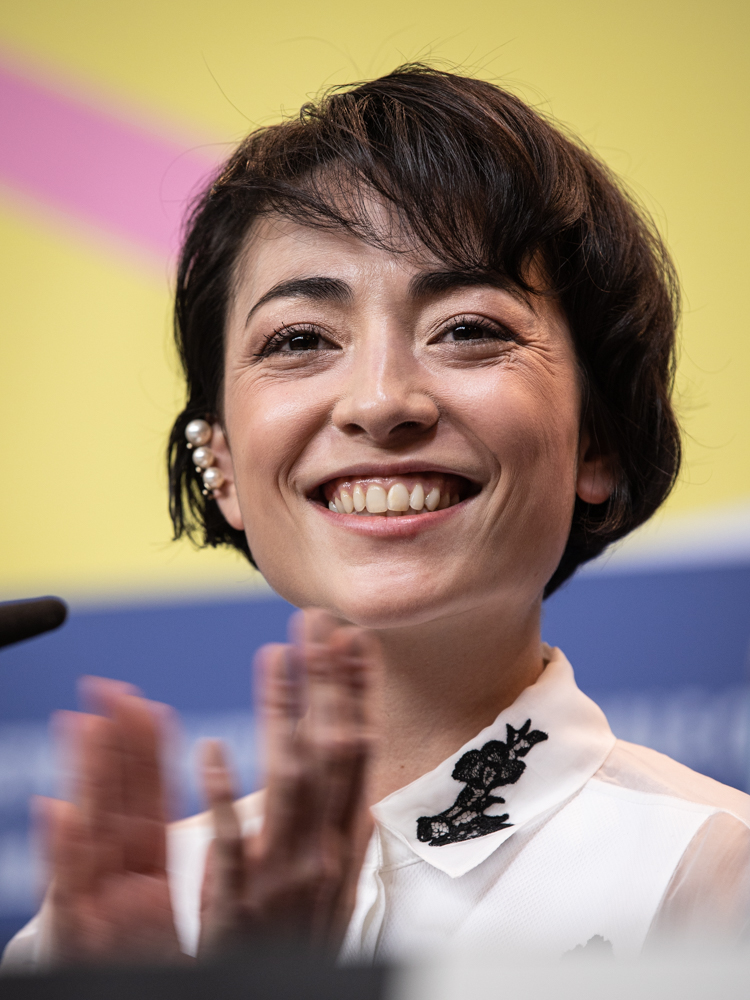
- Minami in 2020
- Born: Minami Bages (バージュ美波); September 22, 1986 (age 39); Tokyo, Japan
- Occupation: Actress
- Years active: 2000–present
- Agent: Artist International Group
- Website: minami-imanim.com

Minami Bages (バージュ美波, Bāju Minami; born 22 September 1986), known professionally as Minami (美波), is a Japanese actress of half French descent.

== Biography ==
Minami was born in Tokyo, Japan on 22 September 1986. She is internationally known for her role as Shogo Kawada's girlfriend Keiko Onuki in the critically acclaimed Japanese film Battle Royale.

=== Career ===
She was previously employed under Horipro, a giant Japanese model and talent agency. She acted in the 2006 Japanese drama film Humoresque: Sakasama no Chou (literally Humoresque: The Upside Down Butterfly).

She has acted in films including Toso Kuso Tawake, Lament of the Lamb, Robo Rock and Detroit Metal City, and Yukan Club. She also starred in the Hanazakari No Kimitachi E special, in which she portrays a character named Julia.

=== Modeling ===
Minami is a regular print model for Japanese fashion magazines, as well as appearing in other magazines such as mina, SEDA, Phat Photo, Dolce Vita and 26ans. She is also a regular model for Shiseido Majolica Majorica, and often appears on their website. She also has featured on many advertisements for both Shisheido and Lotte Pione.

== Filmography ==
=== Films ===
- 2000 Battle Royale (バトルロワイアル) as Onuki Keiko
- 2002 Yumeko's Nightmare (惨劇館 夢子) as Okuyo Yumeko
- 2003 Embraced by Mana (マナに抱かれて) as Emi
- 2004 Problem Free Us (問題のない私たち) as Shiozaki Maria
- 2005 Tomie: Revenge (富江 REVENGE) as Fuyugi Yukiko
- 2006 Humoresque: Sakasama no Chou (ユモレスク 〜逆さまの蝶〜) as Sonny
- 2007 Sakuran (さくらん) as Wakagiku
- 2007 Tōbō Kuso Tawake (逃亡くそたわけ) as Hanachan
- 2007 Robo☆Rock (Robo☆Rock) as Kiriko
- 2008 Detroit Metal City (デトロイト・メタル・シティ) as Nina
- 2010 Vengeance Can Wait (乱暴と待機) as Nanase
- 2012 Afro Tanaka (アフロ田中) as Sacchan
- 2015 Her Granddaughter
- 2018 Vision as Hana
- 2019 Tezuka's Barbara
- 2020 Minamata as Aileen
- 2023 Rohan at the Louvre as Emma Noguchi
- 2023 Confess to Your Crimes as Misaki Kamiya
- 2024 Kaze yo Arashi yo as Ichiko Kamichika

=== Television series ===
- 2004 Cheer Heaven (天国への応援歌 チアーズ〜チアリーディングにかけた青春〜) as Tamura Miho
- 2007 Getsuyou Golden (月曜ゴールデン)
- 2007 Operation Mystery Second File (怪奇大作戦 セカンドファイル) as Ogawa Saori
- 2007 Yūkan Club as Kenbishi Yuri
- 2008 Loss Time Life (ロス:タイム:ライフ) as Yoshida Yukari
- 2008 Save the Future・Boku no shima/Kanojo no Sango (Save the Future・僕の島/彼女のサンゴ) as Inoue Shiori
- 2009 Hanazakari no Kimitachi e as Julia Maxwell
- 2009 OL Nippon (OLにっぽん) as Yabe Sakura
- 2009 The Quiz Show (ザ・クイズショウ) as Mika
- 2010 Trick Shinsaku Special 2 (Trick 新作スペシャル 2) as Sasaki Kikushi
- 2011 Banquet of the Lower Class (下流の宴) as Miyagi Tamao
- 2011 Human Metamorphosis as Tomura Toshiko
- 2011 Yujo Mameshiba (幼獣マメシバー) as Kitajo Yoshiki
- 2012 Person of Destiny (運命の人) as Jahana Michi
- 2022 Kaze yo Arashi yo as Ichiko Kamichika
- 2022 First Love
