= Tomie vs Tomie =

- Film poster
- Directed by: Tomohiro Kubo
- Screenplay by: Tomohiro Kubo
- Based on: Tomie by Junji Ito
- Produced by: Yasuhiko Higashi; Kazuaki Kubo
- Starring: Yū Abiru; Tōru Hachinohe; Emiko Matsuoka; Masaki Miura
- Cinematography: Yasutaka Nagano
- Edited by: Hiroyuki Yamada
- Music by: Takayoshi Tarui
- Production company: Art Port
- Distributed by: Art Port
- Release date: November 17, 2007 (Japan)
- Running time: 86 minutes
- Country: Japan
- Language: Japanese

Tomie vs Tomie (Japanese: 富江 vs 富江) is a 2007 Japanese horror film directed by Tomohiro Kubo. It is the seventh installment of the Tomie film series, based on the manga series of the same name by Junji Ito, specifically The Gathering chapter from the third volume.

== Plot ==
The plot revolves around two children who were injected with the original Tomie's blood, and thus grew into full-fledged Tomies themselves. The process, however, was flawed, causing them to degrade and forcing them to attempt to locate more blood from a "pure" Tomie to sustain themselves.

The two girls are fully unaware of each other's existence until one of the Tomies, still a young girl, who is playing outside by herself, finds a dying bird and kills it instantly, only for the other Tomie to come across her. They both ask the other who they are, and both in turn refuse to respond, with them becoming rivals.

Years later, a young man named Kazuki who recently witnessed Naoko, his girlfriend, being brutally murdered, is dealing with depression and PTSD, made worse by the fact that Naoko's body was never actually found. In an attempt to repress his memories of the murder, Kazuki begins to work in a mannequin factory, where he attracts the amorous attention of one of the two girls-turned-Tomies who lurks behind the scenes at the factory. Intrigued by him, Tomie persuades his coworkers to get them to introduce him to her, but when they meet, he realizes she looks exactly like the deceased Naoko, but due to his love for the original Naoko and his inability to move on from her, he does not feel any particular attraction to her. This of course intrigues her even more, and she begins to become obsessed with him.

However, this Tomie soon comes in contact with her old rival, whom she has been searching for a long time; the rival Tomie, who has also been searching for her, finally introduces herself and states that her name is also Tomie. When the second Tomie becomes obsessed with Kazuki as well, he is caught in a vicious struggle between the two rival Tomies. And neither Tomie will die.

== Cast ==
- Yū Abiru as Tomie Kawakami / Naoko Ikeno
  - Chika Arakawa as a Young Tomie / Naoko
- Emiko Matsuoka as Tomie Kawakami
  - Natsuki Kasa as a Young Tomie
- Tōru Hachinohe as Kazuki Umehara
- Masaki Miura
- Nathan Jerome
