= Kenji Mizuhashi =

Japanese actor (born 1975)

- Born: 13 January 1975 (age 51); Tokyo, Japan
- Occupation: Actor
- Years active: 1997–present

Kenji Mizuhashi (水橋研二, Mizuhashi Kenji; born January 13, 1975) is a Japanese actor. He has appeared in more than 60 films since 1997, portraying Kenichi Yamamoto in Tomie (1998) and Tomie: Beginning (2005).

== Selected filmography ==
=== Film ===
| Year | Title | Role | Notes | Ref. |
|---|---|---|---|---|
| 1998 | Tomie | Takeshie Yamamoto | | |
| 1999 | Moonlight Whispers | Takuya Hidaka | Lead role | |
| 2000 | Nichiyobi wa Owaranai | | | |
| 2004 | The Taste of Tea | | | |
| 2001 | The Guys from Paradise | | | |
| 2001 | Pulse | | | |
| 2005 | Tomie: Beginning | Takeshi Yamamoto | | |
| 2007 | 5 Centimeters Per Second | Takaki Tōno (voice) | Lead role | |
| 2018 | Lost in Ramen | | | |
| 2019 | The Woman Who Keeps A Murderer | Fuyuki Tajima | | |
| 2020 | Kazoku Dessin | | Lead role | |
| 2020 | Runway | Takumi | | |
| 2021 | Rika: Love Obsessed Psycho | | | |
| 2022 | Shimamori | | | |
| 2023 | Scroll | Katō | | |
| 2024 | Drawing Closer | | | |
| 2025 | Seishun Gestalt Houkai | Kuwano | | |
| 2025 | Love Song | | | |
| 2026 | Service Oath | | | |
| 2026 | Godzilla Minus Zero | Kunio Tsuruno | | |

=== Television ===
| Year | Title | Role | Notes | Ref. |
|---|---|---|---|---|
| 2008 | Kamen Rider Kiva | Shinji Takeuchi / Grizzly Fangire | Eps 23–24 | |
| 2016 | Sanada Maru | Kichizo (Francis Kichi) | Taiga drama | |
| 2020 | Detective Yuri Rintaro | Futo Shiga | Eps 4–5 | |
| 2020 | The Way of the Househusband | Makoto Tono | | |
| 2026 | Brothers in Arms | Mori Yoshinari | Taiga drama | |
