= Tomie =

Japanese manga series

- First volume cover of the 2011 edition, featuring Tomie Kawakami.

富江
- Genre: Psychological horror; Supernatural
- Manga
- Written by: Junji Ito
- Published by: Asahi Sonorama
- English publisher: NA: ComicsOne (former) Viz Media
- Magazine: Monthly Halloween, Nemuki
- Original run: 1987 – 2000
- Volumes: 3
- Television drama

Tomie: Another Face
- Directed by: Toshirō Inomata
- Produced by: Yasuyuki Uemura, Shun Shimizu, Ito ChokuKatsu
- Written by: Shotaro Oikawa
- Music by: Hayashida Hideaki
- Studio: Daiei
- Licensed by: NA: Adness Entertainment
- Original network: Kansai TV
- Original run: October 25, 1999
- Episodes: 3
- Novel

Tomie: Replay
- Written by: Fumihiko Iino
- Published by: Asahi Sonorama
- Published: February 2000
- Live action films
- Tomie; Replay; Re-birth; Forbidden Fruit; Beginning; Revenge; Tomie vs Tomie; Unlimited

Tomie (Japanese: 富江) is a Japanese manga series written and illustrated by Junji Ito. It centers on a mysterious, beautiful woman named Tomie Kawakami. The manga was Ito's first published work that he originally submitted to Monthly Halloween, a shōjo magazine in 1987, which led to him winning the Kazuo Umezu award.

Tomie has been adapted into a live-action film series with nine installments to date, an anthology television series released in 1999, and a streaming television series was in development for Quibi before the service was shut down.

== Plot ==
Tomie Kawakami, identified by her sleek black hair and a beauty mark below her right eye, acts like a succubus, possessing an undisclosed power to make any man fall in love with her. Through her mere presence, or through psychological and emotional manipulation, she drives these people into jealous rages that often lead to brutal acts of violence. Men kill each other over her, and women are driven to insanity as well—though there are some who are strong enough to resist her. Tomie is inevitably killed time and time again, only to regenerate and spread her curse to other victims, making her effectively immortal. Her origins are never explained, though it is suggested by some older men in the series that she has existed long before the events of the manga.

Each story showcases various characters that encounter Tomie in her many (often hideous) forms, with some having their own arcs or returning in later chapters. Tomie's regenerative abilities (partly fuelled by cannibalism and assimilation) are also showcased: aside from recovering quickly from gruesome and seemingly mortal wounds, she can also replicate herself by sprouting unnaturally from any part of her body, whether it be from severed limbs, organs, or even her spilled blood. Radiation accelerates her healing/regeneration process. Her cells are also capable of transforming a victim into a Tomie via an organ transplant. Multiple characters are even driven to dismember her corpse, unwittingly allowing more Tomie copies to grow and spread throughout the world. Even locks of her hair are dangerous, burrowing into its victims' brain to possess them, and eventually killing them when it grows wildly within the body. It is also shown that even if Tomie's body is not injured, her body will attempt to sprout another Tomie through tumorous growths, usually when she is emotionally stressed. Some Tomie copies, however, cannot stand one another; one is seen killing another personally, while others order it done through the boys they seduce/enslave. Fire is the only known method to destroy a Tomie for good, though only if the flesh is completely carbonized.

The next story arc, beginning as a prequel, reveals that a baby girl can grow naturally into a Tomie via a blood injection and that she can age if she has not yet copied herself. The man responsible for these injections is a horribly burnt stranger—once a supermodel disgraced by a Tomie in his past—who seeks revenge by making one of these "natural" Tomies old and ugly. He manages to encase a Tomie named "Ayaka" in a block of cement with the help of Ayaka's older sister. The two then wait for many years—endlessly hearing her tormented cries—before finally breaking the block, revealing that Tomie had somehow escaped through a tiny crack, her apparent wailing being nothing more than wind blowing through the hollow block.

An arc released exclusively with the DVD release of the Junji Ito Collection, titled Tomie: Takeover, features Tomie encountering a man capable of body-switching, who finds her various abilities difficult to handle.

A four-page crossover arc with Souichi Tsujii, titled Souichi Possessed, was released in 2018. In the story, the titular's Souichi's older brother Koichi tells a younger Tomie of his attempted mischief of a brother's encounter with a different elderly Tomie, the arc serving as the prologue to a larger confrontation between the pair, as the younger Tomie requests an introduction.

== Publication ==
Tomie is published by Asahi Sonorama and appeared as a serial in the manga magazine Monthly Halloween from 1987 to 2000. Tomie received one bound volume in February 1996, titled Tomie no kyōfu gaka (富江の恐怖 画家, lit. Tomie of Fear: Painter). Two volumes were collected into the overarching series The Junji Ito Horror Comic Collection (伊藤潤二恐怖マンガCollection) as volume 1 and 2 of the series. Asahi Sonorama released an omnibus volume in February 2000 titled, Tomie Zen (富江 (全)). ComicsOne released both volumes on April 1, 2001, with flipped artwork (read left-to-right).

A second series titled Atarashī Tomie (新しい富江, New Tomie) was serialized in Nemuki and was collected into a single bound volume titled Tomie Again: Tomie Part 3 (富江Again―富江 Part3) and released in March 2001. Tomie was re-released again as part of The Junji Ito Museum of Horror (伊藤潤二恐怖博物館) series. This version was also released in two volumes with the addition of the chapters originally released in Tomie Again. Dark Horse Comics released this version in its original right-to-left format.

Asahi Sonorama re-released the manga again in two volumes as part of the Junji Ito Masterpiece Collection (伊藤潤二傑作集, Itō Junji Kessaku-shū) on January 20, 2011.

Viz Media announced their license to the series on March 26, 2016. They published it as a single hardcover volume, similar to their releases of Gyo and Uzumaki.

== Analysis and themes ==
=== Gendered violence and the monstrous-feminine ===
The central cycle of Tomie consisting of seduction, male obsession, and brutal murder invokes what scholar Tosha R. Taylor describes as "popular discourses of such violence" where blame is placed on the female victim. Men in the narrative frequently justify killing and dismembering Tomie as an inevitable expression of love, a framing Taylor notes "complicat[es] victim/villain dichotomies." While Tomie embodies the "monstrous-feminine," a concept Barbara Creed links to male fears, her graphic deaths often visually suggest sexual assault. Critic Isabel Cristina Pinedo compares the display of the violated body in horror to the "money shot" in pornography, and Taylor observes that Tomie's imagery, such as her gang dismemberment in the first story, bears a "visual similarity to a gang rape," exposing the horror of misogynistic violence rather than glorifying it.

A critical context is that Tomie was serialized in Monthly Halloween, a horror magazine targeted at young women. Taylor notes that Tomie embodies pressures specific to girlhood: intense social competition, the threat of male violence, and precarious identity. Her bullying of other girls and terror of being replaced by her copies reflect anxieties about young women's identities in a patriarchal society. The female focalizers in stories like "Photo" experience Tomie as a haunting presence, aligning the reader with female vulnerability.

=== Body horror and abjection ===
Tomie falls within the body horror subgenre, exemplified by Tomie's grotesque transformations: malformed regenerations, a hidden second head, and human-object hybrids. Her fate is intrinsically linked to abjection, a concept theorist Julia Kristeva describes as being epitomized by the corpse, which "beckons to us and ends up engulfing us." Taylor argues Tomie experiences abjection through her murders, transformations, and replications. The horror lies not just in her destruction but in the threat her replicating doppelgangers pose to her unique identity, representing a profound loss of bodily and social autonomy.

== Adaptations ==
Tomie has been adapted into a series of Japanese horror films released between 1998 and 2011. There are to date nine films in the series. The 2018 anime Junji Ito Collection was presented with two episodes where Tomie was the main character, and the 2023 Junji Ito Maniac had another episode with Tomie.

Most of the manga stories occur during the dark of night for its sense of eeriness, and the films generally follow suit.

There are many similarities, but also differences, from the film to the manga. For examples, in the books her eyes are silver, but are brown in the films (in some manga chapters as well her hair is not black but instead blonde or brown); in the films, Tomie's sexuality is more ambiguous as well. In the manga, Tomie's attitude towards women seems to range between thinly veiled hostility and outright murderous rage (unless she stands to profit from them), while the film incarnation is known to seduce women as well as men, and in many of the movies in fact befriends a solitary girl, though their friendship tends to have lesbian undertones.

In July 2019, Alexandre Aja was announced to be developing a television series adaptation of Tomie for Quibi, in conjunction with Sony Pictures Television and Universal Content Productions, with David Leslie Johnson-McGoldrick serving as writer and executive producer and Hiroki Shirota on board as co-producer. In July 2020, Adeline Rudolph was announced to have been cast as Tomie. In October 2020, it was announced that Quibi is shutting down on December 1, 2020, leaving the fate of the series in question.

== Reception ==
Junji Ito won honorable mention for the Kazuo Umezu Prize in 1987 and won the prize in 1989 for Tomie. Since then, the manga has spawned a cult following and is still generally praised by fans and critics alike.

== See also ==
- Eel Girl
- Girl from Nowhere
- Harpya
- Jenifer
- Jennifer's Body
- Shambleau
- Tamara
