= Hisako Shirata =

Japanese actress and fashion model (born 1982)

- 白田 久子
- Born: 17 August 1982 (age 43); Kōchi, Kōchi, Japan
- Other names: Shiratama-chan (しらたまちゃん)
- Occupations: Model; actress; tarento
- Years active: 1998–
- Style: Fashion
- Height: 170 cm (5 ft 7 in)

Hisako Shirata (白田 久子, しらたひさこ, Shirata Hisako; born 17 August 1982 in Kōchi, Kōchi) is a Japanese actress, fashion model and beauty pageant titleholder.

Shirata's affiliation office originally Flos, after passing through Blenden on the way, as of 2013 she is no with Adesso. She graduated from Horikoshi High School. Shirata has an older brother who is nine years older.

== Biography ==
In 1998, after being scouted Shirata made her debut in the television drama Bishōjo H (Fuji Television). She changed to the film actress route in 2003, and her name changed to hiragana (しらたひさこ). For Shirata's first time in the same year's publicly released film Kanzen naru Shiiku: Himitsu no Chikashitsu she challenged to be nude. she was elected Miss International Japan 2006 and represented her country at Miss International 2007 pageant. he participated in the 2007 World Competition and entered "Top 15" and was chosen as "Miss Photogenic". Shirata married professional golfer Ryuichi Aoki in 2015. On 11 February 2016, she announced her first child pregnancy. In 5 May, Shirata gave birth to her first child.

== Filmography ==
=== TV dramas ===
Year	Title	Network
1998	Bishōjo H	Fuji TV
1999	Bishōjo H2	Fuji TV
1999	The Doctor	TBS
2000	Warui Onna "Shuffle"	TBS
2000	Sora no kake-ra	NTV
2000	Ichigen no Koto	NHK
2002	Two Handsman	TV Asahi
2003	Beginner	Fuji TV
2004	Nejireta Kizuna: Aka-chan Torichigae Jiken no Shinjitsu	TBS
2007	Koisuru Nichiyōbi Dai 3 Series	BS-TBS

=== Other than TV dramas ===
Year	Title	Network
2005	Sanryū Daigaku Ōendan	Fuji TV
	Nejireta Kizuna	TBS
2007	2007-Nendo NHK TV Chūgokugo Kaiwa	NHK E
2008	Quiz! Shinsuke-kun	ABC
2013	Wagamama! Kimama! Tabi Kibun	BS Fuji

=== Films ===
Year	Title
2003	Kanzen naru Shiiku: Himitsu no Chikashitsu
2005	Kazuo Umezu no Kyōfu Gekijō "Moshi-tachi no Ie"
2005	Tomie: Revenge
2005	Futago
2005	Bakuretsu Toshi
2006	Shūkyoku Ninja
2007	Kegareta Daimon: Kanketsu-hen

=== Advertisements ===
Year	Title	Link
	Wakamoto Pharmaceutical Aban Beads	
	Toyo Suisan Maruchan Cup noodle	
	Asahi Shimbun	
	McDonald's	
	Tokyo Disneyland	
	Calpis Momo to Calpis	
	Mitsukoshi Kyoto Kimono	
	Sony PlayStation	
	Chubu Electric Power	
2007	Miki Corporation	
	Sekisui House	
	Nikka Whisky Super Nikka	
2011	Yaruki Switch no School IE "Josei Hatsu! Sōri Daijin Tanjō!"	1
	Kärcher	

=== Magazines ===
Title
Oggi
Classy
More
Maquia
Vingtaine

=== Stills ===
Title	Link
Fujifilm	
Pip	
Lusca	
Shiseido fuente	
T&G Avenel Geihinkan (Himeji)	2
2012 Kōchi Kankō Campaign Ryōma no Kyūjitsu	3

=== DVD ===
Year	Title
2008	Pink Diamond

=== Shows ===
Year	Title
2011	Girls Award

=== Stage ===
Year	Title
2008	Yūjō
