= Rie Suegara =

Japanese voice actress

- 末柄 里恵
- Born: January 8, 1990 (age 36); Kanagawa Prefecture, Japan
- Occupation: Voice actress
- Years active: 2010–present
- Agent: Ken Production
- Height: 151 cm (4 ft 11 in)

Rie Suegara (末柄 里恵, Suegara Rie; born January 8, 1990) is a Japanese voice actress from Kanagawa Prefecture, Japan. She is affiliated with Ken Production.

== Filmography ==
=== Anime ===
2013

- Diabolik Lovers (Yui Komori)

2014

- Haikyū!! (Mao Aihara)

2015

- Diabolik Lovers More, Blood (Yui Komori)

2016

- Brave Witches (Takami Karibuchi)
- D.Gray-man Hallow (Tewaku)
- Divine Gate (Mordred)

2018

- Märchen Mädchen (Shizuka Tsuchimikado)
- The Master of Ragnarok & Blesser of Einherjar (Felicia)
- Harukana Receive (Emily Thomas)

2019

- Isekai Cheat Magician (Charlotte)
- Kemono Michi: Rise Up (Hiroyuki, Altena Elgard Ratis)
- Junji Ito Collection (Tomie Kawakami)

2020

- Tower of God (Endorsi Jahad)

2022

- Bocchi the Rock! (Michiyo Gotō)

2023

- Junji Ito Maniac: Japanese Tales of the Macabre (Tomie)
- Jujutsu Kaisen (Saori)

2025

- I Want to Escape from Princess Lessons (Maria)

=== Video games ===
- The Idolmaster Million Live! (Fūka Toyokawa)
- Azur Lane (USS Colorado)
- Raramagi (Reina Tachibana)
- Grand Summoners (Death Sickle Queen Lily)
- The King of Fighters All Star (New Brian)
- Fate/Grand Order (Galatea)
- War of the Visions: Final Fantasy Brave Exvius (Alaya Rundall)
- Tokyo 7th Sisters (Sisala Kawasumi)

=== Dubbing ===
==== Live-action ====
- Christine (2019 Blu-Ray edition) (Leigh Cabot (Alexandra Paul))
- Joy Ride 3: Road Kill (Jewel McCaul (Kirsten Prout))
- Machete Kills (Sartana Rivera (Jessica Alba))
- War Room (Danielle Jordan (Alena Pitts))

==== Animation ====
- World of Winx (Flora)
