= Mia Murano =

Japanese model and actress

- Born: July 22, 1986 (age 40); Otsu, Shiga, Japan
- Height: 1.60 m (5 ft 3 in)
- Website: http://www.web-foster.com/foster/murano_p.htm

Mia Murano (Japanese: 邑野みあ/邑野未亜/Murano Mia, born July 22, 1986, in Otsu, Shiga, Japan) is a Japanese model and actress.

== Filmography ==
=== TV series ===
- Sensei, shiranaino? (1998)
- Saiko metorâ EIJI 2 (1999)
- Eien no ko (2000)
- Kikujirō to Saki (2001)
- Rinshō shinrishi (2002)
- Yankee bokō ni kaeru (2003)
- STAND UP!! (2003)
- Kotobuki Wars (2004)
- Rikon Bengoshi (2004)
- Seishun no mon: Chikuhō-hen (2005)

=== Movies ===
- Karaoke (1998)
- Tomie: Re-birth (2001)
- Engawa no inu (2001)
- MAKOTO (2005)

=== TV ads ===
- Kagome "Rokujōmugicha" Japanese tea (1999)
- Square Enix Unlimited Saga (2001)
- Suntory "Minamiarupusu no tennensui" mineral water (2002)
- Coca-Cola Japan "Coca-Cola" soft drink (2005)

=== Video games ===
- Flower, Sun, and Rain (2001)
