= Mami Nakamura =

Japanese actress (born 1979)

- Born: 14 January 1979 (age 46); Kanagawa Prefecture, Japan
- Occupation: Actress

Mami Nakamura (中村 麻美, Nakamura Mami, born January 14, 1979) is a Japanese therapist and former actress.

== Career ==
Nakamura debuted in Genjiro Arato's The Girl of the Silence in 1995. She starred in Ryuichi Hiroki's 2000 film, Tokyo Trash Baby. Nakamura also appeared in Hiroki's 2011 film, River.

Nakamura left acting around 2011 and now works full time as a therapist. For a while she also dabbled in politics, running for the Nara at-large district seat under the right-wing Sanseitō Party in the 2022 Japanese House of Councillors election, but lost the bid. She announced her resignation from the party the following year.

== Filmography ==
- The Girl of the Silence (1995)
- Gohatto (1999)
- Tomie (1999) as Tsukiko Izumisawa
- Tokyo Trash Baby (2000)
- Tales of the Unusual (2000)
- The Mars Canon (2001)
- Blood and Bones (2004)
- Jukai (2004)
- World's End Girlfriend (2005)
- Love Exposure (2008)
- Forgotten Dreams (2011)
- River (2011)
