= Ataru Oikawa =

Japanese film director and screenwriter (born 1957)

- 及川 中
- Born: September 5, 1957 (age 68); Tokyo, Japan
- Occupations: Film director, screenwriter

Ataru Oikawa (及川 中, Oikawa Ataru) is a Japanese film director and screenwriter. While working as an editor at Magazine House, he wrote screenplays, and made his debut as a screenwriter with his original scenario DOOR (dir. Banmei Takahashi). Later, he quit Magazine House and became a film director.

== Filmography ==
- Tomie (1999)
- Lovers' Kiss (2003)
- Einstein Girl (2005)
- Tomie: Beginning (2005)
- Tomie: Revenge (2005)
- Apartment 1303 (2007)
- Kisshō Tennyo (2007)
- Higurashi no Naku Koro ni (2008)
- Higurashi no Naku Koro ni Chikai (2009)
- Shojō Sensō (2011)
