= Tomie: Another Face =

- Written by: Shotaro Oikawa
- Directed by: Toshirō Inomata
- Starring: Runa Nagai; Akira Shirai; Chie Tanaka
- Original language: Japanese
- No. of seasons: 1
- No. of episodes: 3

Production
- Producers: Yasuyuki Uemura; Shun Shimizu; Ito ChokuKatsu
- Running time: 20-25 minutes

Original release
- Network: Kansai Television
- Release: October 25, 1999

Tomie: Another Face (Japanese: 富江 アナザフェイス, Hepburn: Tomie: Anaza feisu) is a 1999 Japanese horror film directed by Toshirō Inomata. It is based on a manga of the same name by Junji Ito. The film was originally a TV series consisting of three V-cinema episodes, later spliced into a feature film.

Originally titled 富江 恐怖の美少女 (Tomie kyōfu no bishōjo, literally "Tomie: Fearsome Beauty"), the series was given Another Face as its new title as a film on VHS and DVD.

== Plot ==
In the first episode, a man wearing a trench coat and eye patch follows a high school student named Tomie Kawakami. A week prior, Tomie was killed by a still unknown perpetrator, leaving her boyfriend Takashi in a depressive state. Miki, Takashi’s ex-girlfriend, attempts to cheer him up when Tomie reappears alive, shocking her classmates. Tomie gets back together with Takashi, despite her breaking up with him the week before. After seeing Tomie on a date with another man, Miki confronts her and asks her to break up with Takashi to spare his feelings. Tomie accuses Miki of being jealous and refuses to break up with any of the men she's dating, unaware that Takashi has been listening to her confession. Tomie attempts to apologize to Takashi, but a struggle ensues and she is thrown from the roof. Takashi reveals that he was the one who killed Tomie, enraged after she had tried to break up with him. Miki and Takashi bury her body in the woods, but as they walk to school the next morning, Tomie is miraculously there waiting for them.

The second episode focuses on a photographer named Mori who returns to his hometown after more than a decade away. In his youth, Mori encountered a girl whose beauty captivated him and ignited his passion for photography. However, he has never found another woman as beautiful as her, causing him to become bored and uninspired. He visits a seedy bar and sees Tomie, who so perfectly resembles the girl from his youth that he assumes she is that woman's daughter. Mori asks her to model for him, and they spend day together taking photos, while the man with the eye patch watches them from a distance. Mori takes Tomie home with him for the night after they both admit they have feelings for each other and kiss. The two have sex at Mori's home, and after Tomie falls asleep, Mori develops the photographs taken that day. Mori is horrified to find that every picture of Tomie has two faces: Tomie's face and a previously unseen ghoul's face. Realizing that Tomie is the same girl he encountered all those years ago and that she has not aged since, Mori asks Tomie if she is a ghost. Attempting to prove she is actually alive, Tomie makes him feel her pulse and then tells him to kill her. Mori strangles Tomie who does indeed die. However, as Mori is driving to dispose of her body, she comes back to life and scares him out of the car. He runs until he finds himself in the place where he saw the girl from his past, and he encounters two living Tomies. He falls to his death from a cliff and the previously-dead Tomie stands over his body, grinning and making a V sign while the Tomie from his past takes their picture.

The final episode begins with Tomie meeting her boyfriend, Yasuda, for a date. Despite only having been together for one month, Yasuda asks Tomie to marry him. The proposal is interrupted when they are attacked by the man with the eye patch, though they manage to escape. Tomie gives Yasuda a knife and tells him to kill the attacker to prove his love for her. Yasuda confronts the man with the eye patch, but is tasered into submission. The man, named Oota, reveals that he was once a police coroner and Tomie was a murder victim he was to perform an autopsy on. She returned to life, stabbed his eye out, and crawled away; however none of his coworkers believed him and thought that he instead stole the corpse for necrophilia-like purposes. Oota was subsequently fired and his wife left him and took their children. Oota discovered duplicates of Tomie all over Japan and seeks a way to destroy Tomie once and for all. Oota warns Yasuda to stay away from Tomie, gives Yasuda his phone number, and releases him. After finding out Yasuda failed to kill Oota, Tomie throws his engagement ring away and abandons him. We see the boyfriend take out his knife and follow Tomie. Later, Yasuda contacts Oota and brings Tomie's body to him, where he is waiting to burn her in an incinerator. Oota goes to retrieve Tomie from Yasuda's van, but she is still alive; Yasuda reveals the a ruse and attacks Oota. Oota again subdues Yasuda and carries Tomie to the incinerator, while she attempts to seduce him. Oota throws her into the incinerator and sets it on fire, successfully burning Tomie. Oota celebrates, but her ashes begin to move and form into a face in midair before Oota. As the ashes blow away in the wind, she vows that she will never die and that every speck of ash will become a new Tomie.

== Cast ==
- Runa Nagai as Tomie Kawakami
- Akira Shirai as Oota
- Chie Tanaka as Miki
- Mitsuaki Kaneko as Takashi
- Atsushi Okuno as Mori

== Release ==
Tomie: Another Face was released in Japan on October 25, 1999.
