= Tomie Unlimited =

- Film poster
- Directed by: Noboru Iguchi
- Screenplay by: Jun Tsugita; Noboru Iguchi
- Based on: Tomie by Junji Ito
- Produced by: Gen Sato
- Starring: Moe Arai; Miu Nakamura
- Cinematography: Yasutaka Nagano
- Edited by: Takeshi Wada
- Music by: Takashi Nakagawa
- Production companies: T-JOY; CJ Entertainment; Toei Company
- Distributed by: Toei Company
- Release date: May 14, 2011 (Japan)
- Running time: 85 minutes
- Country: Japan
- Language: Japanese

Tomie Unlimited (Japanese: 富江 アンリミテッド, Hepburn: Tomie anrimiteddo) is a 2011 Japanese psychological-body horror film directed by Noboru Iguchi and the eighth installment and reboot of the Tomie film series, partially contains elements of the manga chapters, such as Photograph, Kiss and Mansion.

== Plot ==
Tsukiko Izumikawa (Moe Arai) is a member of the high school's photography club. On her way home with her best friend Yoshie Kazuya (Aika Ota), Tsukiko runs into her elder sister Tomie (Miu Nakamura) who goes to the same high school. Tomie is with Toshio Shinoda (Kensuke Owada) - a guy that Tsukiko secretly crushes on. Per Tomie's request, Tsukiko takes a few pictures of her. As Toshio leaves, Tomie tells Tsukiko that she knows she is jealous of her being close friends with Toshio. Confused, Tsukiko stops taking pictures and watches in horror as Tomie is crushed on her neck by a steel cross that falls from a building under construction, killing her.

One year later, Tsukiko's daily life slowly returns to some sense of normality, but she still suffers from grief and recurring nightmares over her sister's death. On Tomie's 18th birthday, Tsukiko and her parents, Masashi (Kouichi Ohori) and Kimiko Izumikawa (Maiko Kawakami), stand around a birthday cake in her honor. At that time someone knocks on their door. When Tsukiko goes to get the door, she sees that it is her deceased sister; Tomie, standing in the doorway with her beauty shining even more brightly than before. Her parents are delighted to see Tomie and welcome her back in joyful tears, while Tsukiko is confused.

Tomie manages to get Masashi to whip Tsukiko across the back with a steam iron cable as punishment for not showing affection towards her. However, Tomie's behavior starts becoming increasingly bizarre and abnormal as she shows Tsukiko the scar on her neck that begins to evolve into a deranged, talking tumor. Tsukiko, disgusted and horrified by Tomie's tumor, calls Tomie a "monster". Offended, Tomie decides to leave, but is prevented from doing so Masashi stabs and kills her with a butcher knife.

The next morning, Tsukiko witnesses Kimiko dismembering Tomie's body in the bathroom. Kimiko then disposes of Tomie's head by throwing it away in the trash bin and goes to prepare Tsukiko's school lunch, accidentally dropping several chunks of Tomie's flesh and hair in it. At school, a new student appears in Tsukiko's class: Tomie Kawakami, who looks just like her dead sister. While at lunch with Yoshie, who doesn't believe Tsukiko's concerns that her sister has come back from the dead yet again, Tsukiko sees several miniature Tomie heads growing in her lunch. Shocked and disgusted, Tsukiko runs off and throws the lunch pack into the trash. When Yoshie goes to look for Tsukiko, she hears noises in the trash and leans over to investigate. Suddenly, the miniature Tomie heads appear and strangle Yoshie with their abnormally long tongues, killing her.

Meanwhile, at home, Tomie's head rises from the trash bin and convinces Masashi to kill Kimiko and feed her body to her. Back at school, Tsukiko encounters Yoshie with a tumor on her neck similar to the one Tomie had and runs off in panic. When Yoshie enters the Judo club's room while looking for Tsukiko, she is decapitated by the members who mistook her head for the tumor. Her headless body comes back to life, and she starts chasing the Judo Club members. Tsukiko then walks into Toshio, witnessing him stab a Tomie to death, and a new Tomie forms out of the blood and begins kissing Toshio. Tsukiko kills Toshio, runs off into a locker room, and encounters several versions of Tomie.

Just as she is about to be cornered by the Tomies, she wakes up in her bed. Her parents inform her that she is an only child and that she never had a sister when she asks about Tomie. Tsukiko sighs in relief, believing she just had a bad nightmare, which proves to be false when Masashi starts eating hair and Kimiko's head suddenly stretches abnormally to the point where it appears to be upside down. It turns out that Japan is being overrun by intoxicatingly beautiful humanoid regenerative creatures who respond to the name Tomie, and that to save their family from a giant Tomie head and Tomie centipedes Tsukiko's parents plan to offer their daughter up as a sacrifice to the Tomies, and Tsukiko's dream was a representation of her fear about the Tomies.

Tomie does not want Tsukiko as a sacrifice, however, and attacks Kimiko before she can stab her daughter. Tsukiko runs upstairs and encounters Toshio and Yoshie, who tell her that they are mortified by their friendship with her in her dream, and in real life, they always hated her and thought she was annoying. Hurt, Tsukiko pushes them down the stairs and they are both attacked by the centipedes. Tsukiko then encounters a huge giant Tomie head in her living room, and after a brief conversation, the "sisters" reconcile, and the Tomie centipedes begin crawling over her.

The ending has Tsukiko walking out of the house, having become another Tomie. As she walks through the streets of Japan, she observes other women she passes by, many of them also being Tomies. She walks up to a man, smiling, and is then shown being murdered by him in an apartment. Lying on the floor, she looks at a mirror, retaining some degree of her original personality. However, the reflection she sees in the mirror is of Tomie, resembling the way she did in Tsukiko's dream when she was Tsukiko's sister, who asks Tsukiko if she is happy. In response, Tsukiko laughs sadistically.

== Cast ==
- Moe Arai as Tsukiko Izumikawa, the protagonist, a young teenage girl who loves taking photos and has a crush on her popular classmate Toshio
- Miu Nakamura as Tomie Izumikawa / Tomie Kawakami, Tsukiko's elder sister who she is jealous of and a mysterious, flirty girl who looks just like Tsukiko's sister, respectively. Nakamura also plays several other versions of Tomie
- Aika Ota as Yoshie Kazuya, Tsukiko's best friend, a happy, peppy girl
- Maiko Kawakami as Kimiko Izumikawa, Tsukiko and Tomie's mother, nurturing and caring, but often subdued by her husband
- Kensuke Owada as Toshio Shinoda, a popular boy at Tsukiko and Tomie's school who Tsukiko has a secret crush on, as well as the leader of the school's Judo club
- Kouichi Ohori as Masashi Izumikawa, Tsukiko and Tomie's father, who is generally distant and sometimes berates his wife

== Release ==
Unlimited had its international premiere at the Fantasia Festival on July 31, 2011.
