= Tomie Kawakami =

- Tomie character
- Tomie Kawakami as drawn by Junji Ito
- First appearance: Tomie (1987)
- Last appearance: Tomie: Takeover (2018)
- Created by: Junji Ito
- Portrayed by: Miho Kanno; Runa Nagai; Mai Hosho; Miki Sakai; Nozomi Andô; Rio Matsumoto; Anri Ban; Yu Abiru; Emiko Matsuoka; Miu Nakamura; Adeline Rudolph
- Voiced by: Rie Suegara (Japanese); Monica Rial (English)

In-universe information
- Aliases: Marina; Tomie Iizuka; Ayaka Nakamura; Miho Kaneshiro; Mai Oyama; Reiko Mizutani
- Gender: Female
- Nationality: Japanese

Tomie Kawakami, (Japanese: 川上 富江, Hepburn: Kawakami Tomie) better known mononymously as Tomie, is the first antagonist from the Japanese horror manga and film series of the same name created by Junji Ito. Tomie made her first appearance in Ito's 1987 manga Tomie, which was published in Monthly Halloween, a shōjo magazine. She later appeared in two subsequent manga written by Ito, nine feature films, and a novel.

Tomie is a malevolent, regenerative entity with the unexplained ability to cause anyone, particularly men, to be instantly attracted to her. These actions inevitably lead to violence, usually resulting in the murder of Tomie herself (allowing her to replicate herself), or others. Rather than being one singular person or entity, it would be better to describe Tomie as a type of creature, seeing as each copy of Tomie is its own independent individual.

== History ==
Tomie was written and illustrated by Junji Ito. Ito was inspired to create Tomie by the phenomenon of lizard tail regeneration. Ito's initial concept for the manga was to depict the strangeness of a girl who was nonchalantly attending school, but in reality was dead. He further explained that the original concept was that for some reason a dead person would come back to life and visit their former friends as if nothing had happened. As he developed the story, Ito established that the titular character would be a mean-spirited girl because he believed it would be more interesting if the manga featured someone that wasn't likable.

He noted that the proliferation of Tomie was created while writing a serial storyline, which helped greatly to convey the concept of regeneration.

In 1998, during the casting process of the first film adaptation, Ito picked actress Miho Kanno for the role and coached her for the audition.

== Characteristics and abilities ==
Miu Nakamura as Tomie in Unlimited

Tomie's main attribute is her exceptional beauty; she is often described as being skinny with slight curves, with pale white skin so shiny and light it is almost transparent, shiny, long black hair (although some manga stories depict her as having blonde, dirty brown, or light brown hair; her hair, typically long and with bangs has also appeared in various other styles) and a beauty mark just beneath her left eye. Her eyes are uplifted and cat-like and often shown as being light silver, but some versions show her with brown eyes, particularly the films, the first of which showed a Tomie early in development as having golden-orange eyes that later change to brown. Her beauty causes people around her to be jealous of her, or infatuated, to the point where they are driven insane and will do nearly anything for her, and they typically end up cutting her into pieces as a result of an urge her presence caused in people.

Other than her beauty and ability to psychologically manipulate others, her most notable trait is a form of regeneration that operates similarly to that of a sea star or a planarian. Tomie heals incredibly fast, even from supposedly mortal wounds, and occasionally if the wound is big enough a new variation of her will grow from her wounds. If a part of her body, such as an arm, leg or even head is severed, an entire clone of her body will grow from the severed part. Tomie can successfully regenerate from the smallest portions of her body, including her fingers and even her blood. Each clone has the same name and personality, and possess a shared consciousness in the event of multiple clones being active at the same time. However, each clone believes its counterparts to be impostors, and will attempt to eliminate them if they happen to meet each other. If a copy of Tomie forms from a separated body part, for example, they will retain the memories of the Tomie they are derived from. Thus, when her stricken admirers cut her to pieces, Tomie inevitably comes back, often using this opportunity to wreak further havoc in their lives.

The one exception to her regenerative powers seems to be Tomie's hair, which, rather than developing into a complete duplicate, will instead attach itself to the body of another person, resume growing, and multiply out of control, eventually killing the victim by piercing a vital organ or by literally causing the victim's body to rupture, as seen in the chapter Hair from the second volume. Tomie also demonstrates a form of asexual reproduction similar to vegetative propagation in plants or budding in yeast, in that when she undergoes severe psychological stress, she may begin spontaneously splitting into two clones, starting by growing a second head. Should Tomie die by decapitation during this process, two clones will emerge; her head will grow a new body, while her headless body regrows its head.

While Tomie's regenerative powers are extremely efficient, they can be slowed by exposing her regenerating body to acid. The rate is also reduced without a sufficient intake of nutrients, forcing her on one occasion to engage in cannibalism to accelerate her regeneration and development. In some works, it is implied that burning the body of a Tomie clone will kill her permanently, while in others, she regenerates from the ashes, though this could be because she was not completely burned. In one case, dozens of small fragments of Tomie's flesh fell into a pond below a waterfall, forming sessile bodies. These bodies used their powers to lure men into a pond, then devoured them for sustenance until they finished regenerating, at which point the group of fully-formed clones nonchalantly walked out of the pond.

Tomie can also clone herself by having her cells come into contact with a victim, in one case from the skin cells when the victim used her lipstick. These cells will slowly transform the victim into a clone of Tomie, though in some cases, usually when an organ of Tomie's ends up in someone else's body, a new Tomie will grow inside them from the organ and burst out from their body if not surgically excised in time.

Tomie is fully aware of her immortality, and generally uses it, along with her powers of seduction, to manipulate her victims seemingly for her own amusement. She does not actually care about any of the people she targets, being stated in the manga as viewing them as "accessories", and despite her vain attitude towards other people her powers causing them to overlook her attitude, they usually end up having a breaking point in which they end up killing her after she makes fun of them too much. Tomie is also known for her eerie, mocking evil laugh, often heard after successfully manipulating or psychologically tormenting her victims. Her laughter reflects her extreme narcissism, sadism, and confidence in her supernatural immortality, and is often written as "ho ho ho" in the manga adaptations.

At times, due to the abundance of times Tomie has died again and again, as well as many of her deaths involving dismemberment or separation of her tissues, two or more Tomie clones will emerge and eventually come into conflict with each other. However, their attempts at murdering each other often succeed only in creating yet more clones of herself, while other times they burn the body and possibly succeed in eliminating their counterpart. This was the basis for the 2007 film Tomie vs Tomie. However, if a group of Tomies are together while in the early stages of development, they will be civil, behaving similarly to siblings until they develop fully and begin to act more territorial.
