= Editorial Ivrea =

Argentine publishing company

- Industry: Publishing
- Founded: 1997
- Founder: Leandro Oberto; Pablo Ruiz
- Headquarters: Buenos Aires, Argentina
- Area served: Argentina, Chile, Finland, Spain
- Products: Comics
- Website: editorialivrea.com

Editorial Ivrea is an Argentine manga and comics publisher that publishes in Argentina, Chile, Finland and Spain. They also published Lazer, a magazine which was specialized in anime, comics, manga, series and other media. The magazine has an acid humor and has also organized parties in Argentina. On June 15, 2008, they started Lazer Royale, in which they made Concourse for cosplayers, and Tokyo Weekend on July 27, 2008. Famous singers Nobuo Yamada and Ricardo Cruz also appeared during the event. During August 2009, Ivrea announced the end of Lazers publication due to copyright issues with Shueisha and Shogakukan regarding the use of images in the magazine.

Editorial Ivrea was founded in 1997 in Argentina, and since then, they have released several comics. Initially, they published manga volumes of 200 pages and others of 100 pages, which are half of the tankōbon format. Later, they started releasing manhwa and Argentine comics, including EL NEGRO BLANCO. The Spanish publisher specializes in comics focused on different ages and has also released South American and European books, as well as artbooks from manga series.

== Titles ==
=== Shōnen ===
- A Silent Voice (Argentina)
- Alice in Borderland (Argentina, Spain)
- Anohana (Argentina, Spain)
- Ayakashi Triangle (Argentina, Spain)
- Baki the Grappler (Argentina, Spain)
- Bakuman (Argentina)
- Baoh (Argentina, Spain)
- Beast Complex (Argentina)
- Beastars (Argentina)
- Black Butler (Argentina)
- Black Clover (Argentina)
- Bleach (Argentina)
- Blood+ (Argentina, Finland)
- Blue Box (Argentina)
- Blue Exorcist (Argentina)
- Blue Flag (Argentina, Spain)
- Blue Lock (Argentina)
- Call of the Night (Argentina, Spain)
- Captain Tsubasa (Argentina)
- Chainsaw Man (Argentina)
- D.Gray-man (Argentina, Spain)
- Dandadan (Argentina)
- Deadman Wonderland (Argentina, Finland, Spain)
- Death Note (Argentina)
- Demon Slayer: Kimetsu no Yaiba (Argentina)
- Don't Toy with Me, Miss Nagatoro (Argentina, Spain)
- Dr. Stone (Spain)
- Dragon Ball (Argentina)
- Dragon Ball Super (Argentina)
- Fairy Tail (Argentina)
- Fire Punch (Argentina)
- Frieren (Argentina)
- Fullmetal Alchemist (Argentina)
- Future Diary (Argentina, Finland, Spain)
- Gachiakuta (Argentina)
- Girlfriend, Girlfriend (Argentina, Spain)
- Go! Go! Loser Ranger! (Argentina)
- Great Teacher Onizuka (Argentina, Spain)
- Haikyu!! (Argentina)
- Hell's Paradise: Jigokuraku (Argentina)
- Higehiro (Argentina, Spain)
- Hunter × Hunter (Argentina)
- Hyperinflation (Spain)
- Inuyasha (Argentina)
- I've Been Killing Slimes for 300 Years and Maxed Out My Level (Argentina, Chile)
- Jaco the Galactic Patrolman (Argentina)
- Jojo's Bizarre Adventure (Argentina, Spain)
- Kaiju No. 8 (Argentina)
- Kengan Ashura (Argentina, Spain)
- Komi Can't Communicate (Argentina, Spain)
- KonoSuba (Argentina, Spain)
- Kubo Won't Let Me Be Invisible (Argentina, Chile)
- Level E (Spain)
- Little Witch Academia (Argentina, Spain)
- Love Hina (Spain)
- Mashle (Argentina)
- Mermaid Saga (Argentina)
- Mob Psycho 100 (Argentina, Spain)
- My Hero Academia (Argentina)
- My Hero Academia: Team-Up Missions (Argentina)
- My Hero Academia: Vigilantes (Argentina)
- Neon Genesis Evangelion (Argentina)
- One Piece (Argentina)
- Pandora Hearts (Argentina)
- PPPPPP (Spain)
- Ranking of Kings (Argentina, Spain)
- Ranma ½ (Argentina)
- Rent-A-Girlfriend (Argentina, Spain)
- Rurouni Kenshin (Argentina)
- Saint Seiya (Argentina)
- Saint Seiya: Next Dimension (Argentina, Spain)
- Sakamoto Days (Argentina, Spain)
- Shaman King (Argentina, Spain)
- Sanda (Argentina, Spain)
- Slam Dunk (Argentina, Spain)
- Spy × Family (Argentina, Spain)
- Sun-Ken Rock (Argentina, Spain)
- Takopi's Original Sin (Argentina)
- Teasing Master Takagi-san (Spain)
- The Case Study of Vanitas (Argentina)
- The Flowers of Evil (Argentina)
- The Girl I Like Forgot Her Glasses (Argentina, Chile)
- The Promised Neverland (Argentina)
- The Quintessential Quintuplets (Argentina)
- The Seven Deadly Sins (Argentina)
- To Your Eternity (Argentina)
- Toilet-Bound Hanako-kun (Spain)
- Tokyo Revengers (Argentina)
- Trinity Seven (Argentina, Spain)
- We Never Learn (Argentina, Spain)
- Welcome to Demon School! Iruma-kun (Argentina, Spain)
- Your Lie in April (Argentina)
- YuYu Hakusho (Argentina, Spain)

=== Shōjo ===
- Ao Haru Ride (Argentina, Finland, Spain)
- Cardcaptor Sakura (Argentina)
- Cardcaptor Sakura: Clear Card (Argentina)
- Clover (Argentina)
- Codename: Sailor V (Argentina)
- D.N.Angel (Argentina, Spain)
- Fragments of Horror (Argentina)
- Fruits Basket (Argentina)
- Fushigi Yûgi (Argentina, Spain)
- Junjo Romantica: Pure Romance (Argentina, Spain)
- Kare Kano (Argentina)
- Living-Room Matsunaga-san (Argentina)
- Love Celeb (Argentina, Finland, Spain)
- Magic Knight Rayearth (Argentina)
- Maid Sama! (Spain)
- Nana (Argentina)
- Neighborhood Story (Argentina)
- Sailor Moon (Argentina)
- Sensor (Argentina)
- Strobe Edge (Argentina, Spain)
- Tomie (Argentina)
- Yakuza Lover (Spain)

=== Seinen ===
- 3×3 Eyes (Spain)
- 20th Century Boys (Argentina)
- A Whisker Away (Argentina, Spain)
- Ajin: Demi-Human (Argentina)
- Akebi's Sailor Uniform (Spain)
- Another (Argentina, Finland, Spain)
- Arakawa Under the Bridge (Argentina, Chile)
- Basilisk (Argentina, Spain)
- Battle Angel Alita (Argentina, Spain)
- Battle Angel Alita: Last Order (Argentina, Spain)
- Battle Royale (Argentina, Spain)
- Blood on the Tracks (Argentina)
- Btooom! (Argentina, Spain)
- Bungo Stray Dogs (Argentina)
- Choujin X (Argentina)
- City Hunter (Argentina, Chile)
- Darling in the Franxx (Argentina, Spain)
- Dead Dead Demon's Dededede Destruction (Argentina)
- Devils' Line (Spain)
- Dorohedoro (Argentina)
- Erased (Argentina)
- Gantz (Argentina)
- Gigant (Argentina, Spain)
- Gleipnir (Spain)
- Goblin Slayer (Argentina, Spain)
- Goodnight Punpun (Argentina)
- Grand Blue (Argentina)
- Hellsing (Argentina)
- Homunculus (Argentina, Spain)
- I Am a Hero (Argentina)
- Ikki Tousen (Argentina, Spain)
- Innocent (Argentina)
- Inuyashiki (Argentina)
- JoJo's Bizarre Adventure: JoJolion (Spain)
- JoJo's Bizarre Adventure: Steel Ball Run (Spain)
- Kaguya-sama: Love is War (Spain)
- Keep Your Hands Off Eizouken! (Spain)
- Kill la Kill (Argentina, Finland, Spain)
- Kingdom (Argentina, Spain)
- Made in Abyss (Argentina, Spain)
- Medalist (Argentina, Spain)
- Mieruko-chan (Argentina, Spain)
- Miss Kobayashi's Dragon Maid (Argentina, Spain)
- Monster (Argentina)
- No Longer Human (Argentina)
- One-Punch Man (Spain)
- Oshi no Ko (Argentina, Spain)
- Puella Magi Madoka Magica (Argentina, Finland, Spain)
- Record of Ragnarok (Argentina, Spain)
- Real (Argentina, Spain)
- Remina (Argentina)
- Rooster Fighter (Argentina, Spain)
- Saint Seiya: Saintia Shō (Argentina, Spain)
- She and Her Cat (Argentina)
- Steins;Gate (Argentina, Finland, Spain)
- Sword Art Online (Argentina)
- Tekkonkinkreet (Argentina)
- The Garden of Words (Argentina)
- The Golden Sheep (Argentina)
- The Rising of the Shield Hero (Argentina, Spain)
- The Way of the Househusband (Argentina, Spain)
- Tengen Hero Wars (Spain)
- Tokyo Ghoul (Argentina)
- Uzumaki (Argentina)
- Vagabond (Argentina, Spain)
- Vampeerz (Argentina, Spain)
- Voices of a Distant Star (Argentina)
- Witch Hat Atelier (Argentina)
- Your Name (Argentina)

=== Josei ===
- Cherry Magic! Thirty Years of Virginity Can Make You a Wizard?! (Argentina, Spain)
- Paradise Kiss (Argentina, Finland, Spain)
- The World's Greatest First Love (Argentina, Spain)
- Ten Count (Argentina, Spain)
- The Stranger by the Beach (Argentina)

=== Other ===
- Citrus (Argentina, Spain)
- Hitorijime My Hero (Argentina, Spain)

=== Webtoon ===
- Solo Leveling (Argentina)
