= No Longer Human (disambiguation) =

No Longer Human is a 1948 novel by Osamu Dazai.

No Longer Human may also refer to:

- No Longer Human (Ito manga), a manga series adaptation of the novel
- No Longer Human (2019), a biographical movie about Osamu Dasai in his latter years, starring Shun Oguri
- No Longer Human (musical), 2021 musical theatre adaptation of the novel
