= Lovesickness (manga) =

Japanese manga series

死びとの恋わずらい (Shibito no Koiwazurai)
- Genre: Horror; Science fiction; Supernatural
- Manga
- Written by: Junji Ito
- Published by: Asahi Sonorama
- English publisher: NA: Viz Media
- Magazine: Nemuki
- Original run: May 1996 – November 1996
- Volumes: 1
- Live-action film

Love Ghost
- Directed by: Kazuyuki Shibuya
- Written by: Naoyuki Tomomatsu
- Licensed by: NA: Eleven Arts
- Released: March 24, 2001
- Runtime: 95 minutes

Lovesickness (Japanese: 死びとの恋わずらい, Hepburn: Shibito no Koiwazurai) is a Japanese manga series written and illustrated by Junji Ito. It was serialized in Nemuki from May to November 1996 and collected into one volume in May 1997. A live-action film adaptation, titled Love Ghost, was released in March 2001.

== Plot ==
Ryuusuke lives in a perpetually foggy town where crossroads fortunes are still common. When his parents told him they were moving, he ran away from home and was prompted to give a fortune by a woman pregnant from a married man's affair. Ryuusuke, still angry, tells her it will never work out. The woman commits suicide the next day, and Ryuusuke blames himself.

Years later, Ryuusuke's family moves back to the same town and Ryuusuke reunites with his childhood friend, Midori. He meets Midori's popular friend Reishi. Ryuusuke's mental health deteriorates as he learns that woman at the crossroads was Midori's aunt. Soon a Pretty Boy wearing all black starts giving unfavorable crossroads fortunes to women asking about their love life, followed by the women committing suicide. After Ryuusuke lashes out at Reishi, she becomes one of the Pretty Boy's victims. To atone, Ryuusuke starts patrolling the crossroads to catch the Pretty Boy.

A woman asks Midori for her fortune, but begins pestering her family endlessly with more and more questions. Eventually she starts harassing Ryuusuke instead. After he gets her to leave, he finds her at a crossroads covering in tattoos. She explains the Pretty Boy's told her the solution to her problems is to "find a bigger problem." She decides to solve this problem by leaving and setting herself on fire.

Ryuusuke's friend Teshima visits over school break. Teshima tries to help Ryuusuke find the Pretty Boy, but gets scared off when he finds Reishi's ghost. He suggests that Ryuusuke might somehow be the Pretty Boy. The rumor gets around school resulting in Ryuusuke getting harassed by people blaming him for Reishi's death and women wanting a fortune from him. Ryuusuke learns that Teshima was trying to goad him into suicide so Reishi's ghost would stop haunting him. Ryuusuke explains that he isn't the Pretty Boy, causing Reishi to move on. Teshima is institutionalized soon after.

Ryuusuke goes into hiding, with Midori giving him food. Midori professes her love to him, and overcome with guilt, Ryuusuke confesses to her aunt's suicide. Midori leaves to processes and gets told by the Pretty Boy to hate Ryuusuke for the rest of her life. She begins abusing him, but upon forgiving him kills herself. The Pretty Boy orchestrates 100 women to commit suicide simultaneously, then sends their ghosts to haunt their grieving families. Ryuusuke goes back to town and finds a man who may be the man who had an affair with Midori's aunt, saying his son ran away after that. Ryuusuke is killed by the Pretty Boy's followers.

Now a ghost dressed in all white, Ryuusuke answers fortunes favorably. When the other ghosts ask about their love life, he encourages them, causing them to swarm the Pretty Boy who disappears soon after.

== Media ==
=== Manga ===
Written and illustrated by Junji Ito, the series was serialized in Nemuki from May to November 1996. Asahi Sonorama collected the series' individual chapters into a tankōbon volume, which was released on May 20, 1997.

At Anime Expo Lite, Viz Media announced that they licensed the series for English publication. Viz Media released the series as part of a story compilation, titled Lovesickness: Junji Ito Story Collection, on April 20, 2021.

=== Film ===
A live-action film adaptation, titled Love Ghost, was released in Japan on March 24, 2001. It was directed by Kazuki Shibuya and written by Naoyuki Tomomatsu. Eleven Arts licensed the film for international distribution.

== Reception of the eponymous story collection ==
Nick Smith from ICv2 praised the narrative of the first half of the collection, which comprises the Lovesickness series, though he also felt the second half did not fit with the first. Lynzee Loveridge from Anime News Network offered praise for the artwork, while also criticizing the characters as shallow.

The series was awarded the Eisner Award for Best U.S. Edition of International Material—Asia in 2022.
