= Gyo =

Manga by Junji Ito

- Cover of the first manga volume

ギョ
- Genre: Horror, supernatural
- Manga
- Written by: Junji Ito
- Published by: Shogakukan
- English publisher: NA: Viz Media
- Magazine: Big Comic Spirits
- Original run: November 12, 2001 – April 15, 2002
- Volumes: 2
- Original video animation

Gyo: Tokyo Fish Attack
- Directed by: Takayuki Hirao
- Produced by: Hikaru Kondo
- Written by: Takayuki Hirao; Akihiro Yoshida
- Music by: Go Shiina
- Studio: Ufotable
- Licensed by: AUS: Hanabee; UK: Terracotta Distribution; US: Aniplex of America
- Released: February 15, 2012
- Runtime: 75 minutes

Gyo (Japanese: ギョ; lit. 'Fish'), fully titled Gyo Ugomeku Bukimi (ギョ うごめく不気味; lit. 'Fish: Ghastly Squirming') in Japan, is a Japanese manga series written and illustrated by Junji Ito, appearing as a serial in the weekly seinen manga magazine Big Comic Spirits from 2001 to 2002. Shogakukan collected the chapters into two bound volumes from February to May 2002. The story revolves around a couple, Tadashi and Kaori, as they fight to survive against a mysterious horde of undead fish with metal legs powered by an odor known as the "death stench". The work also includes a pair of bonus stories, titled The Sad Tale of the Principal Post and The Enigma of Amigara Fault.

Viz Media published an English-language translation of the two volumes in North America from September 2003 to March 2004 and re-released it from October 2007 to January 2008. An anime adaptation by Ufotable was released on February 15, 2012.

== Plot ==
=== Story ===
Tadashi, a young man, and his longtime girlfriend Kaori arrive on the island to enjoy a scuba-diving vacation in Okinawa. After encountering a fish with legs, Kaori, who has a hyper-sensitive sense of smell, becomes irritated by its smell and begs Tadashi to get rid of it. He seals it in a bag, but it manages to escape.

Meanwhile, a crew of fishermen aboard a trawler dragged up several strange-looking fish in the boat's net. Upon trying to inspect the unusual creatures, they discover that the strange fish seem to have legs. The fish then suddenly scuttle away, diving back into the ocean. The next day, large amounts of marine life with legs invade Okinawa, including a legged great white shark which menaces the protagonists. Tadashi and Kaori manage to return to Tokyo, although Kaori becomes irritated and paranoid, claiming to smell the fish. They both encounter the bagged fish they originally encased and present it to his uncle, Doctor Koyanagi.

A short while later, Tadashi returns to find Koyanagi missing an arm. He reveals that he was examining the machine in detail, it used a series of spikes and tubes to latch onto his arm, forcing him to amputate it. The walking machine scuttles into the room, now carrying Koyanagi's arm instead of the fish. Koyanagi explains that the creature is the result of the Imperial Japanese Army's World War II research into a virus that causes its host to produce a deadly and repulsive stench, in a desperate effort to turn the tide of the war. His father developed a "walking machine," which pumps the virus into a host and causes the host to release the gas, which powers the machine's movement; walking machines were built to carry the hosts farther, allowing them to reach and sicken enemy troops. However, during the war, enemy aircraft sunk the ship carrying the prototypes for the walking machines.

Soon, Kaori and Tadashi discover that hordes of marine life with legs are in the process of overrunning Tokyo, having gradually invaded the Kantō region. Having become infected by the gas, Kaori becomes depressed by being subjected to her illness's symptoms and attempts suicide. Tadashi takes her to Koyanagi in an effort to save her; however, on the way home, he is attacked by a giant squid attached to a walking machine and falls into a canal, where he passes out after being injured by thousands of small walking fish.

Awakening a month later at a nearby hospital, Tadashi discovers that Koyanagi has placed Kaori into a custom-built walking machine. Upon switching the machine on, Koyanagi is mortally wounded by Kaori, who quickly escapes. Wandering through the desolate city streets, Tadashi finds that most of the walking fish have decayed, and that walking machines are now carrying land animals, including infected humans. As he continues to make his way through the city, he reaches a circus, where he learns from the ringmaster that the gas appears to be alive, taking on a ghost-like appearance when ignited. Tadashi encounters Kaori and retrieves her from one of the acts at the circus.

As the pair arrive at Koyanagi's lab, Koyanagi's assistant, Ms. Yoshiyama, reveals that the doctor died after succumbing to his wounds. When she attempts to remove the walking machine from Kaori, Koyanagi appears, mutated by the infection and attached to a modified walking machine in the form of an airship that allows him to fly. Kaori notices Tadashi and Ms. Yoshiyama together and attempts to attack her. During the uproar, Koyanagi manages to capture Ms. Yoshiyama and fly away while large groups of walking machines attack Kaori, and Tadashi becomes lost in his attempt to save her.

Shortly afterwards, the circus troupe arrives and uses a human cannon, modified to fire the bodies of deceased infected humans, to damage Koyanagi's airship. Though its envelope is destroyed, the machine deploys a set of wings and escapes. Tadashi encounters a group of students from Kyoto University, who explain that they are immune and that the virus created the walking machines after synthesizing them from shipwrecks. He joins the students in their research to defeat the virus and save humanity. As the group walks together, Tadashi encounters Kaori's burnt remains and remarks that she is free from the smell.

=== Characters ===
- Tadashi (忠): A young man who enjoys scuba diving. He has a girlfriend named Kaori and an uncle named Koyanagi. At the end he joins a group of university students, who happen to be immune from the death-stench, to create a vaccine to defeat the disease. In the OVA version, instead of Kaori, Tadashi becomes infected and is attached to a custom made walking machine by Koyanagi. The machine later turns against Koyanagi and kills him before escaping.
- Kaori (華織): Tadashi's girlfriend. She has an extremely sensitive nose and becomes very jealous when Tadashi is near other women. Due to her overly sensitive nose, she seems to be able to smell the creatures when they are nearby. However, she is later infected, causing her body to swell up and forces the gas with the "death stench" out of her body. Because of this, she began to think she was disgusting, that Tadashi wouldn't love her if she wasn't beautiful. This, along with the horrible stench, made her attempt suicide. Tadashi then immediately carries her to his uncle Koyanagi's lab for aid, however Koyanagi rigs her up to a custom walking machine and ultimately, she becomes like the walking dead creatures, except with a will of her own. As a walking machine, she is eventually destroyed by a horde of other walking machines that deem the custom walker to be a threat to their survival. In the OVA adaptation, Kaori is switched with Tadashi as the main protagonist. She also possesses the unexplained immunity to the infected creatures' poisons instead of Tadashi.
- Doctor Koyanagi (小柳教授): Tadashi's uncle and an inventor. He discovers it was his father, who died of a heart attack in a factory during a hot summer, was responsible for the creation of the mechanical legs. While dissecting the fish, the legs then clamp onto his arm. He cuts off his arm to prevent the infection from spreading to the rest of his body. He is fascinated by the machine, not caring that he lost an arm to it. He then creates his own version of the walking machine and puts the infected Kaori onto it. He is mortally wounded when he is stabbed by Kaori's walking machine. He then goes to Lab #2 where his father originally died and places himself onto another walking machine that is able to fly. When he notices Tadashi and Ms. Yoshiyama interacting, he attacks them both and captures her. In the OVA version, Koyanagi is shown as an antagonist who went insane and connected an infected Tadashi to the custom Walker.
- Ms. Yoshiyama (芳山): Assistant of Doctor Koyanagi, who cares for him and Tadashi. When she was seen with Tadashi by Kaori, Kaori tried to attack her. Ms. Yoshiyama then ran outside where she was captured by the Mechanical Koyanagi. She does not appear in the OVA adaptation.
- The Citrous Circus: A circus troupe who establish themselves in Tokyo following the growing death stench pandemic. While most of the troupe and its animals have been infected by the disease, the seemingly immune ringmaster uses the infected and their walking machines to perform acrobatic shows, and appears to have gone insane as a result of learning of the Death Stench's true nature. Shortly after Koyanagi's flying machine is activated, the Citrous Circus attempts to use a cannon to bring down the machine, but to no avail.
- The Students: A group of biology students from Kyoto University, who, like Tadashi, are immune to the Death Stench disease. Introduced at the very end of the story, Tadashi met them after the Citrous Circus attempted to attack Doctor Koyanagi's flying machine. After explaining their immunity, it is revealed by the group that the virus responsible for the Death Stench is constructing walking machines from iron-rich shipwrecks, and that they are researching a vaccine that could be capable of stopping the growing pandemic. Tadashi chooses to join the students following this discovery.
- Tsuyoshi Shirakawa (白河剛): A freelance videographer, appears only in the OVA adaption, Kaori met him in the airplane to Tokyo. Follows Kaori just to get to the location of doctor Koyanagi to get his research data. Got infected at the end of the anime before sending Kaori away to a group of survivors.
- Aki (アキ): Friend of Kaori, appears only in the OVA adaption. She is meek and slightly overweight and feels unattractive, appears to be bullied by Erika. Turned into a walker at the end of the anime.
- Erika (エリカ): Friend of Kaori, appears only in the OVA adaption, an outgoing and attractive girl who has no difficulty attracting other men, and appears to be picking on Aki all the time. She gets infected by the walking fish early on. During a fight, Aki bludgeoned her to death with an ashtray, but she appears to be alive again later on.

== Bonus stories ==
Two unrelated stories, The Sad Tale of the Principal Post (大黒柱悲話, Daikokubashira Hiwa) and The Enigma of Amigara Fault (阿彌殻断層の怪, Amigara Dansō no Kai), are included as a pair of bonus stories, placed at the very end after the conclusion of Gyo. Although both are completely different and unrelated stories (both to each other and to Gyo), they were merged as one chapter altogether. The former is the shorter story, merely consisting of four pages, compared to the latter's thirty-one pages.

=== The Sad Tale of the Principal Post ===
The story starts with a family celebrating their new home. After noticing that her father is missing, the family's daughter hears him crying out in pain and leads her mother and brother into the basement to look for her father. In horror, the three find the father, who has somehow gotten stuck underneath a huge pillar, one of several that support the house, crushing his body. The mother tries in vain to save her husband but he warns that the pillar that traps him is the principal post of the house; if it is moved, the building will collapse. He tells his family that there is no way he can be saved, and he will sacrifice himself so his family can have their home. That evening the man succumbs to his injuries and dies, and his family places a shrine at the post. Time moves on, but his skeleton remains still trapped underneath the post, along with the mystery of how he got stuck in the first place.

=== The Enigma of Amigara Fault ===
A huge earthquake has struck an unnamed prefecture, leaving a fault to be discovered by the people on the Amigara mountain (阿弥 ami is a name element derived from Amida Buddha, and 殻 gara means "husk"). People from all over Japan, including a team of scientists, arrive at the mountain to see the strange sight for themselves.

Two hikers, Owaki and Yoshida, meet while hiking, having the same intention to see the fault. The fault is shrouded in mystery; its face being covered in human-shaped holes. It has captured nationwide interest, and several attempts to examine how far the fault goes have all ended in vain. People discussed the origins of the fault, noting that the holes are not natural and must have been dug from the inside of the mountain, but questioning why the holes were made or who would have the technology to make them.

Owaki notices Yoshida is looking for something, to which she replies she is looking for a hole shaped like herself. Owaki dismisses the idea, stating it to be ridiculous, but another hiker, Nakagaki, overhearing their conversation and siding with Yoshida, claims he has found his own hole. He takes them to his hole, pointing out that it is precisely his size and shape, and that he fits into it exactly. After removing his clothes from his underwear, Nakagaki disappears into the hole before Owaki can stop him. Scientists cannot find any trace of Nakagaki inside the hole, and a rescue team composed of people small enough to squeeze into the hole has to retreat after barely getting 5 meters (16 ft) deep.

Later that night, Owaki has a nightmare about Nakagaki being trapped inside the hole because it has been deformed by the earthquake. He wakes up to find Yoshida claiming she has found her own hole, located near the foot of the fault. Meanwhile, Nakagaki still has not been found. Another man claims a hole is made for him, and disappears into it in a panic, leading to an outburst in which several other people descend into the mountain, much to the horror of the scientists and rescue team, who flee the scene. That night, Yoshida feels that the hole is calling her name and luring her into it, and she knows if she goes there, she will be trapped. Owaki tries to calm her down by stuffing her hole with rocks and stays the night with her.

Owaki has another nightmare. He dreams that he is in the distant past, and, having committed a horrendous crime, is sentenced by a tribe living in the mountain's caves to enter a hole carved in his likeness, forced to keep walking deeper into the mountain's interior in the ever-narrowing tunnel. Owaki enters the hole and after some time moving forward in it, he can feel his neck and limbs being tortuously stretched and distorted, but he remains alive and in agony. He wakes up screaming and finds out that Yoshida has unblocked her hole and disappeared into it. As he sits mournfully in front of Yoshida's hole, he drops his flashlight and discovers his own hole, much to his horror, located near Yoshida's. Mesmerized, he strips off his clothes and enters his hole.

Several months later, the scientists are informed of another fault on the other side of the mountain, revealed during the same earthquake that exposed the first fault but had gone undiscovered until now. This, too, has holes in it, but they are not human-shaped; instead, the shapes are long and distorted. One worker examines one of the holes and, as he shines his flashlight in it, he notices that a horrifyingly disfigured being is slowly inching out of the chasm.

== Media ==
=== Manga ===
Gyo was written and illustrated by Junji Ito. In his words, the inspiration came from Steven Spielberg's Jaws: "He masterfully captured the essence of fear in the form of a man-eating shark. I thought it would be even greater to capture that fear in a man-eating shark that goes on land as well as sea." The manga, published by Shogakukan, was serialized in the weekly manga magazine Big Comic Spirits from 2001 to 2002. Shogakukan compiled the chapters into two bound volumes and published them from February 2002 to May 2002. In North America, Viz Media published volumes of the series from September 2003 to March 2004. Viz Media later re-released the series with new covers from October 2007 to January 2008.

No.	Original release date	Original ISBN	English release date	English ISBN
1	February 28, 2002	4-09-186081-8	September 10, 2003 (1st ed.); October 16, 2007 (2nd ed.)	1-56931-995-2 (1st ed.); ISBN 1-4215-1387-0 (2nd ed.)
01."The Death-Stench of the South Seas" (南海の死臭, Nankai no shishū); 02."The Death-Stench in the Air" (浮遊する死臭, Fuyū suru shishū); 03."Going Ashore" (恐ろしい上陸, Osoroshī jōriku); 04."Shark Attack" (ホオジロザメ侵入, Hōjirozame shin'nyū); 05."Flight" (飛来, Hirai); 06."The Death-Stench Creeps" (しのびよる死臭, Shinobiyoru shishū); 07."Testimony" (遺言, Yuigon); 08."Infection" (感染, Kansen); 09."The Death-Stench invaders, Part 1" (死臭来襲1, Shishū raishū ichi); 10."The Death-Stench invaders, Part 2" (死臭来襲2, Shishū raishū ni)
2	May 30, 2002	4-09-186082-6	March 10, 2004 (1st ed.); January 15, 2008 (2nd ed.)	1-59116-140-1 (1st ed.); ISBN 1-4215-1388-9 (2nd ed.)
11."Pale Kaori" (青白い華織, Aojiroi Kaori); 12."The Death-Stench Device" (死臭の発明, Shishū no hatsumei); 13."The Inheritors" (後継者たち, Kōkei-sha-tachi); 14."The Pull of the Death-Stench" (まとわりつく死臭, Matowaritsuku shishū); 15."The Death-Stench Circus, Part 1" (死臭サーカス団（1）, Shishū sākasu-dan (ichi)); 16."The Death-Stench Circus, Part 2" (死臭サーカス団（2）, Shishū sākasu-dan (ni)); 17."The Death-Stench of Lab #2" (第二研究室の死臭, Dai ni kenkyūshitsu no shishū); 18."The Death-Stench Air Raid" (死臭空襲, Shishū kūshū); 19."The Death-Stench World" (死臭の時代, Shishū no jidai); Bonus 1:"The Sad Tale of the Principal Post" (大黒柱悲話, Daikokubashira hiwa); Bonus 2:"The Enigma of Amigara Fault" (阿弥殻断層の怪, Amigara dansō no kai)

=== OVA ===
An OVA adaptation was produced by Ufotable. It was directed by Takayuki Hirao while character designs were provided by Takuro Takahashi. The OVA was originally planned to be 30 minutes long but had evolved to 75 minutes throughout production. It was originally slated to release on December 14, 2011, but was delayed and released on February 15, 2012.

Terracotta screened the film in London at the Prince Charles Cinema from April 12–15, 2012 as part of their Terracotta Far East Film Festival. Terracotta released the film on DVD September 3, 2012. Both DVD and Blu-ray versions were also released in Australia in March 2013 by Hanabee and DVD-only in North America on July 9, 2013, by Aniplex of America.

== Reception ==
In France, Gyo was nominated at the 37th annual Angoulême International Comics Festival. Katherine Dacey of Mangacritic.com placed the manga at #1 on her Favorite Spooky Manga list.

For the first volume, Carl Kimlinger of Anime News Network praised the art and the bizarre relationship that Tadashi and Kaori share. Josephine Fortune of Mania gave it an A, praising the artwork, specifically the detail of the backgrounds. Fortune also praised the pacing of the story although noted that the plot contradicts itself later in the volume. Ken Haley of PopCultureShock gave it a B+ praising the silly moments the manga had and how they resembled that of an action/horror story normally seen in theaters. Michael Aronson of Manga Life gave it an A, echoing similar praise regarding story stating, "Logic holes and an absurd concept be damned, this is still an utterly compelling read that's sure to squeeze at one's stomach a few times." Greg McElhatton of Read About Comics noted Ito's art skill as keeping the story from becoming "silly".

For the second volume, Kimlinger continued to praise the story stating: "This final volume may be one of the most genuinely nauseating books ever to blight a shelf." Fortune gave it a B+ again praising the artwork and pacing of the plot, although noted that the plot had some holes in its logic and that readers who enjoy concrete and definitive endings may not like the ending of the manga. Aronson also noted issues with the plot, however noted, "It's still a gorgeous piece of scar tissue that seems like a polished experiment more than a deeply considered publication."
