= Fragments of Horror =

Japanese manga series

- Cover of the manga anthology. (Note: A number of reviewers have commented on its similarity to Edvard Munch's painting The Scream.)

魔の断片 (Ma no Kakera)
- Genre: Horror
- Manga
- Written by: Junji Ito
- Published by: The Asahi Shimbun Company
- English publisher: NA: Viz Media
- Magazine: Nemuki
- Original run: April 13, 2013 – April 12, 2014
- Volumes: 1

Fragments of Horror (魔(ま)の断片(かけら), Ma no Kakera) is a Japanese horror anthology manga series written and illustrated by Junji Ito. It was serialized in Nemuki between April 2013 and February 2014 as seven separate short stories, with an eighth being added for the tankōbon release. Viz Media published it in North America under its Viz Signature imprint. The Junji Ito Collection anime anthology, which premiered in January 2018, adapts several stories from Fragments of Horror.

== Plot ==
The book is a collection of eight short stories:

- "Futon" (布団, Futon)

Madoka's husband Tomio refuses to leave his futon for fear of "dark nature spirits" that he says are everywhere. Tomio explains that he had a one-night stand with a mysterious woman who turned out to be a demon and that ever since then, he has seen the spirits everywhere he looks. One evening when Madoka is in bed, she suddenly begins to see the spirits, as well as the demon Tomio encountered, and flees the apartment, not returning for an entire month. When she does, she finds Tomio in a near-trance-like state and still inside the futon, which is overgrown with a hallucinogenic mold that had been responsible for everything the two had seen.

- "Haunted Wood Mansion" (木造の怪, Mokuzō no Kai)

Megumi's house has recently been designated a Tangible Cultural Property. One day, a woman named Manami Kino visits to see the house, hoping to see it for her architecture class. Claiming to be enamored with the house, which she calls "sexy", she asks if she can board there, and Megumi's father agrees. Eventually, the two are married, completing Manami's efforts at infiltrating the family to gain access to the house. One night, Megumi stumbles upon Manami rubbing herself naked against the walls of the house. Later, she comes downstairs to find her father frantically trying to scrub away eyes that have suddenly appeared in the floorboards. Megumi looks up to see Manami straddling one of the roof beams, transformed into an animate wooden statue, which laughs at her menacingly. After passing out, and briefly dreaming of her childhood at the house with her mother, who had divorced from her father when Megumi was still young, she awakens to find her father attempting to set the house on fire. Convincing him to stop, Megumi leads her father to safety as the house transforms into a hideous, hairy lump, having come alive as a result of Manami's actions. Manami has disappeared, presumably having merged with the building, which is subsequently delisted as a national treasure.

- "Tomio • Red Turtleneck" (富夫・赤いハイネック, Tomio • Akai Hainekku)

Tomio arrives at his girlfriend Madoka's apartment begging for help. (Note: Though it features the same characters, it is unclear if this story is in the same canon as "Futon".) Three days ago, the two had broken up after Tomio began an affair with a fortune teller they had visited together. As Tomio and the fortune teller lie in bed, she professes to be in love with his head and asks if she can have it, proceeding to pluck one of her hairs and begin garroting him. After he makes her desist, she gives him a turtleneck sweater to hide the mark and takes him to see "something good", which turns out to be a collection of severed heads. As Tomio flees, her hair, which was concealed in the collar of the sweater, begins to contract, cutting into his neck and forcing him to hold his head with both hands. He explains the situation to Madoka and she calls an ambulance; instead of an ambulance, however, the fortune teller arrives. She tortures Tomio by inserting a live cockroach into the slit in his neck, causing Madoka to stab her to death with a pair of scissors. As her body disintegrates, a trio of demonic children appear and attack Tomio, calling him "Daddy" and asking to play. They knock his head off as Madoka screams in terror, believing Tomio to be dead. Sometime later, the two awaken to find that his head is reattached and conclude that the children must have been hallucinations. However, the memory of the incident leaves Tomio traumatized, and he continues to hold his head long after the incident.

- "Lingering Farewell" (緩やかな別れ, Yuruyakana Wakare)

After her mother died when she was young, Riko has been plagued by nightmares of her father dying. After she marries Makoto of the Tokura family, she notices that some of his older relatives are translucent, like ghosts. He explains that they are what his family calls "afterimages," a psychic phenomenon created by the family's prayers. The afterimage embodies the deceased person's spirit and allows them to continue to exist as if they were still alive. These afterimages slowly fade over twenty years or so, giving their grieving family members time to say goodbye, and for the deceased to bring closure to their life. One day, ten years later, Riko sees Makoto with Ms. Mori, a woman from his office. When she confronts him, he admits that he and Mori are engaged and intend to marry. He apologizes for not telling the truth and tells Riko that on the day of their engagement, she was struck and killed by a car. Heartbroken, Makoto enlisted his family in creating an afterimage of Riko, and she has remained that way ever since. The next day, Riko, who is beginning to fade, leaves the Tokura household and returns to her father, intent on spending her remaining time with him.

- "Dissection Girl" (解剖ちゃん, Kaibō-chan)

Tatsuro Kamata is a medical student learning dissection as part of his studies. On the first day, one of the cadavers due to be autopsied - a young woman - is still alive. She begs to be dissected before running away. Tatsuro recognizes her as Ruriko Tamiya, whom he knew as a child and who had a disturbing obsession with vivisecting wild animals, forcing him to participate in her experiments and at one point even threatening to dissect him. After Ruriko accosts Tatsuro on the street, he rushes home, only to find her waiting for him with a scalpel, begging him to dissect her. Horrified, he flees as her stomach begins to contort itself, attempting to reconcile the horrifying sight as just a dream. Over the next few days, the news media reported the occurrence of incidents of a similar nature, such as a man stabbing a woman in her stomach, followed by the surgeons who operated on her going insane. Twenty years later, Tatsuro has gone on to become a senior doctor and is training his own class of medical students on how to conduct an autopsy. One of the cadavers supplied is that of Ruriko, this time clearly dead. However, when the students cut her open, they find her insides to be a bizarre and unnerving amalgamation of the animals she dissected during her life.

- "Blackbird" (黒い鳥, Kuroi Tori)

A birdwatcher named Kume finds a man in the forest, with both his legs broken. At the hospital, police question the man, named Shiro Moriguchi, as to how he survived living in the wild in that condition for a month. He claims to have rationed his food but asks Kume to stay with him that evening. During the night, Kume wakes up to see a strange woman in black feeding Shiro raw meat mouth-to-mouth. When she leaves, Shiro relates how she has been feeding him this way for the entire month, keeping him alive, yet she is not stopping now that he has been rescued. The following night, she comes again, this time bearing an eyeball. Kume chases after her, only to see her transform into a giant, harpy-like black bird and fly away. Upon analyzing the meat samples, the police determined that they came from a human. The woman does not appear again, and Shiro recovers, choosing to return to Tokyo; however, as his train leaves, Kume sees a large black bird flying after it. Some years later, Shiro's corpse is discovered being pecked at by a bird high on Mount Fuji. His journal tells of how the woman returned, this time ripping away his flesh until he died. DNA testing shows that the flesh that she had fed him while he was in the wild was, in fact, his own, leading Kume to surmise that she had traveled back in time to feed him his flesh. Going out birdwatching again, Kume is surprised to see the woman perched in a tree. He falls, breaking his leg. She then feeds him a mouthful of unpleasant-tasting meat, commencing the causal loop which will eventually result in his recurrent death and survival.

- "Magami Nanakuse" (七癖曲美, Nanakuse Magami)

Kaoru Koketsu is a devoted fan of the novelist Magami Nanakuse, who is known for the unique quirks that she endows her characters with. Kaoru prides herself on supposedly having quirks similar to Nanakuse's characters and imitates them for weeks at a time after reading Nanakuse’s works. After sending the author a letter, she is invited to meet her at her home, where she is unpleasantly surprised to find that Nanakuse is, in fact, a loud-mouthed, mean-spirited, cross-dressing man, who accuses her of being a "quirk faker". Despite the rather brash nature of this meeting, Kaoru agrees to join Nanakuse for drinks, eventually drinking so much that she passes out from alcohol intoxication, after which Nanakuse imprisons her in a dungeon under the house. In a meeting with the Town Association, Nanakuse explains that she had moved to the town because of its supernatural past; the land having been supposedly used for both burials and rituals of a supernatural and demonic nature. Kaoru awakens to find herself trapped in a cell, surrounded by people exhibiting various quirks. Nanakuse arrives and reveals that she takes her inspiration from the quirks developed by the people she keeps imprisoned there in the darkness and hopes that Kaoru will develop one that she has never seen before. Unable to escape, Kaoru resolves not to move to keep from developing one from her surroundings and the repetitive movements of those around her. Three days later, Nanakuse enters her cell to find that she has become completely rigid and unable to move, her face contorted into a grotesque and deformed expression as a result of attempting to resist the urge to develop a quirk. Having thrilled by Kaoru due to her grotesque appearance, Nanakuse declares that it's the most extreme "quirk" she has ever seen and uses this as the basis of a novel titled Ultimate Quirk before placing Kaoru in a glass case and donating her as a "present" to the Town Association Hall, where she and the rest of the association proceed to laugh at her relentlessly.

- "Whispering Woman" (耳擦りする女, Mimikosuri Suru Onna)

Shigeki Santo's daughter Mayumi suffers from a severe form of anxiety that manifests as aboulomania. Unable to make even the smallest of decisions without suffering panic attacks brought on by the stress of such situations, she relies on others to direct her every motion. After losing yet another employee who could not handle the stress, Santo places an advert for a new assistant, and a woman named Mitsu Uchida answers his help. She proves to be adept at instructing Mayumi through behavioral therapy. Mitsu is extremely dedicated to her work, and never takes a day off, constantly whispering instructions in Mayumi's ear. Over the next few weeks, she becomes pale and thin, clearly ill from the strain of her job, but continues working. Mayumi manages to gain immense confidence thanks to Mitsu's guidance, and curious, Santo hires a private investigator to trace Mitsu's background. The agency finds that she is living with an abusive man named Aga who has forced her to apply for a high-paying job so she can support him. One day, Mitsu is found beaten to death. However, Mayumi's confidence remains, and she believes that Mitsu is still with her; even Santo sometimes believes that he can still hear her whispering in his daughter's ear. Then, one night, Mayumi returns home covered in blood, claiming to have killed Aga on Mitsu's instructions.

== Conception and development ==
Prior to the publication of Fragments of Horror, Junji Ito had not written horror manga for eight years; his last published collection in the genre was Shin Yami no Koe Kaidan in 2006. Ito wrote that "during those eight years, I was doing plenty of work on illustrations and manga about cats or about society, but even taking that into account, the time seems too empty somehow. What on Earth was I doing all that time?" When he submitted the storyboard for the first story, his editor, Mikio Yoshida, expressed concern that Ito's "instincts for horror hadn't returned"; this led him to completely rewrite the story before it was finally published. Still, Ito felt that it was below his usual quality.

== Release ==
Ito began publishing the series in the first issue of The Asahi Shimbun Company's relaunched shōjo manga magazine Nemuki, publishing the first chapter, "Futon" (布団, Futon), on April 13, 2013. Six more chapters were published between June 13, 2013 and April 12, 2014. In addition, when the series was published in collected tankōbon form, an additional story, "Whispering Woman" (耳擦りする女, Mimikosuri Suru Onna), was included. It had previously been published as a one-shot in the magazine Shinkan in 2009. Asahi Shimbun released the series as a single volume on July 8, 2014 (ISBN 978-4-02-214151-4), with a cover designed by Keisuke Minohara.

Viz Media announced via Twitter on December 3, 2014 that it had licensed the anthology, planning to publish it as a single hardcover volume under its Viz Signature imprint in June 2015. It was released on June 16, 2015 (ISBN 978-1-4215-8079-1).

== Adaptation ==
An anime anthology of Ito's short stories, titled Junji Ito Collection, adapted stories from Fragments of Horror and several of Ito's other works. The series premiered on January 5, 2018.

== Reception ==
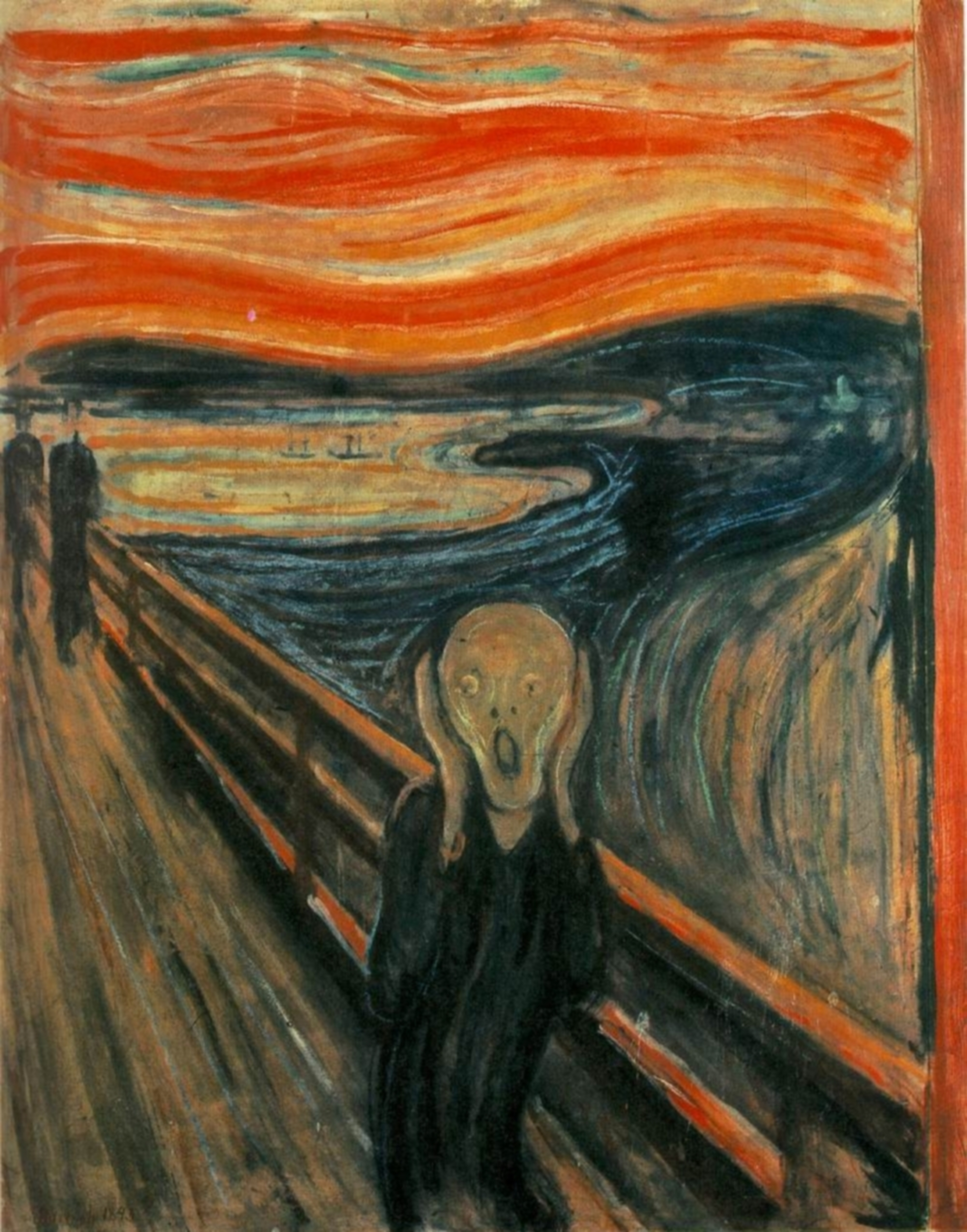
Edvard Munch's 1893 painting The Scream. Some reviewers have commented on the similarity of the anthology cover to this painting.

Reviewing the anthology for Otaku USA magazine, Joseph Luster praised the collection, especially Ito's art, which he called "truly special" and "equal parts gruesome and gorgeous". He also opined that the book contained several instant classics, and was particularly struck by "Blackbird", which he called "the standout hit".

Nick Creamer of Anime News Network praised Ito for his attempts at finding horror in unexpected places, but felt that it was not uniformly successful. He noted how Ito's stories tried to subvert familiarity and thus evoke horror, but opined that doing so caused the stories in the collection to walk the "line between the horrifying and the absurd". He praised Ito's "detailed, unnerving" art, but also felt that sometimes Ito used it to prop up an overall weak story with "one shocking full-page panel". His one critique of the art was that it tended toward being too formal and thus sometimes lacked personality.

In her review for Fangoria, Svetlana Fedotov called the collection a good entry point for new fans that would also satisfy longtime Ito readers. Like many other reviewers, she noticed several Lovecraftian influences in the work, and praised Ito for his "innate knack for bringing out the menace in the most innocent of objects."

Chris Randle of The Guardian gave the series a mostly positive review. He noted that Ito usually avoided being "political" in his stories, and also compared the collection to a toned down version of the ero guro art movement. Ultimately, he concluded that Ito liked to write stories that were less personal and more fascinated with things beyond comprehension, like Lovecraft but without the latter's political views.

In an in-depth review for The Comics Journal, Joe McCulloch opined that the collection was hardly representative of Ito's best work, with only "Whispering Woman" standing out from the others artistically, yet contained interesting shared themes across many of its stories. He made note of how most of the interesting characters in the collection were female - either put-upon protagonists or powerful, liberated, and uncaring antagonists, while the majority of male characters were either treacherous or dull. In his eyes, the common narrative across the collection was one of women confronted by the faithlessness of their male partners and then offered liberation through the actions or example of the consistently female supernatural antagonist. Ultimately, however, McCulloch felt that these themes were not genuine, but rather a slightly cynical attempt to profit from a magazine with a primarily female audience, a motive that he saw as being satirized in the self-aware "Magami Nanakuse".

Zainab Akhtar of Comics & Cola also noted the focus on stories of women betrayed by men and empowered female villains. However, she felt that collection was a poorer imitation of his earlier works, "Ito trying to do Ito, and not quite succeeding." She attributed this to the fact that, while his art maintained its signature horror, the stories failed to connect with the reader on an emotional level.

Shelly Atomic of Comics Bulletin found the collection to be a mix of good and below average stories. She criticized "Tomio • Red Turtleneck" and "Futon" for being directionless, but praised "Blackbird" and "Gentle Goodbye", the one for a "great twist" and the other for its "surprisingly heartfelt and sweat [sic] story", feeling that they showed that Ito still retained the creative energy that defined his early works. She also praised the print quality of the volume, noting that the cover and paper was much higher quality than a standard manga.

A number of reviewers have compared the cover of the anthology to Edvard Munch's painting The Scream.
