= Black Paradox =

Japanese manga series

- Cover of the volume

ブラックパラドクス (Burakku Paradokusu)
- Genre: Horror; Science fiction
- Manga
- Written by: Junji Ito
- Published by: Shogakukan
- English publisher: NA: Viz Media
- Magazine: Big Comic Spirits Zōkan Casual (2007–08); YS Special (2008–09)
- Original run: August 15, 2007 – January 24, 2009
- Volumes: 1

Black Paradox (Japanese: ブラックパラドクス, Hepburn: Burakku Paradokusu) is a Japanese manga series written and illustrated by Junji Ito. It was serialized by Shogakukan in Big Comic Spirits Zōkan Casual (2007–2008) and YS Special (2008–2009); its chapters were collected in a single tankōbon volume.

The story follows four people who meet to attempt a group suicide, but before they can kill themselves, they discover a bizarre phenomenon that could change the course of the world. There are six chapters included in the work, along with two bonus stories, titled The Licking Woman and Mystery Pavilion.

== Plot ==
After meeting each other on a website named Black paradox, four individuals - each using their online pseudonyms - come together to attempt a group suicide. They decide to drive out in a car to a remote location and use the vehicle's exhaust fumes to kill themselves. However, one of the group members, Marousou, runs away when she realizes that all the others are doppelgängers. She eventually meets the real ones in a different car, whose suicide attempt is interrupted by her arrival.

Following the failed first attempt, the group tries to kill themselves again after a while. This time, they decide to overdose on sleeping pills to make the process quicker. Three of them fake their suicide attempts, while the fourth individual, Piitan, is killed. However, he is resurrected shortly afterward, at which point, he throws up a mysterious spherical object and starts talking about an alternate world filled with a dazzling light. The group is intrigued by the object, and decides to take it back for further analysis.

A few days later when the four meet once again, it is revealed that the object is an entirely new mineral, and is extremely valuable. They theorize that it is not any ordinary gemstone, but instead a soul, which originates from the alternate world, and Piitan's pylorus has become a portal to that world. While they are talking, Piitan starts throwing up the objects uncontrollably, which causes his stomach to explode.

Sometime later, two of the members of the group - Tabourou and Baracchi - become rich by selling the gemstones. However, when the objects cause several fires, they are classified as dangerous weapons of terrorism. At the same time, the government starts looking for Tabourou and Baracchi for their connection to the objects, which forces them to go into hiding. Meanwhile, Marousou, who is a nurse, takes a break from work in a remote forest villa owned by Doctor Suka, her colleague. Tabourou and Baracchi follow the two of them in disguise. During their stay at the villa, Dr. Suka reveals that he has cultivated the deceased Piitan's pylorus in an attempt to cross into the other world. He uses Piitan's robot doppelgänger to bring in more gemstones - called Paradoxical Night - into this world.

Baracchi and Tabourou are forced to reveal themselves when Paradoxical Nights start overflowing from a birthmark that covers half of Baracchi's face. Dr. Suka restores her face and cultivates the tissue from her birthmark into another portal. It is later revealed that the portals allow entry only to their respective originators. Dr. Suka pushes Baracchi into her portal when she confronts him about Marousou, who was being held captive in the mansion.

Later, Tabourou withdraws to his own seaside villa after seeing his doppelgänger, who he thinks wants to kill him. During this time, he forms his own portal to the alternate world from his shadow. Marousou develops a tumor in her brain, which is then removed and cultivated into yet another portal by Dr. Suka. In the end, all the four members of the original suicide group are shown to be staying together in the same mansion, where they are used by Dr. Suka and the government to gather more Paradoxical Nights for study as a potential energy source. Marousou, who has now developed the ability to see into the future, predicts that the Paradoxical Nights will ultimately cause the death of much of humanity before ceasing being used, and Dr. Suka will be directly blamed for this outcome in the future.

== Characters ==
- Marousou/Marceau/Miss Kikuchi: A young woman who works as a nurse. She is stricken by paranoia and premonitions of the future; she seeks to die so that she won't have to experience the horrific events she predicts. She becomes a seer once she starts working for the government with the original suicide group.
- Tabourou/Tableau/Tadashi Kurose: A young man who became suicidal after meeting his doppelgänger which he believed to be an omen of his forthcoming death. He believed that he would rather take his own life than wait for death to claim him. He later loses his will to commit suicide and becomes rich by exploiting Paradoxical Night.
- Baracchi/Bara Hiratani: A woman with a disfiguring birth mark covering one side of her face. She believed her reflection was coming to life and that this was a foreshadowing of her death. She has the spirit jewels valued and classified as a new kind of mineral. She was also responsible for putting them on sale under the name "Paradoxical Night," which made her rich. She gave up on committing suicide once her face was restored.
- Piitan/ Mr. Houdou: A melancholy man who was used as the model for a perfect humanoid robot. He could not compare to its perfection and thus felt that there was no reason for him to continue to exist. After taking an overdose of sleeping pills and his heart stopping, he witnesses the spirit world and begins to produce spirit jewels from his stomach via the pylorus - a word which, in Japanese, is written with the characters for "spirit" and "door."
- Dr. Suka: A surgeon working at the same hospital as Marousou. He was also the doctor who was treating Baracchi's birthmark. He found Piitan's body abandoned at the hospital and uncovered the truth about the spirit jewels, planning to use them as a sustainable energy resource. He is a manipulative liar who cheats people and seduces women easily for his own personal agendas.
- Rei Tanio: An attractive actor of whom Baracchi was a fan. She sent him one of the spirit jewels, which he wanted to share with his fans. Unable to break the jewel apart, he fired at it with a gun, causing an explosion of energy which killed him and everyone present.

== Bonus stories ==
Two unrelated short stories, titled The Licking Woman and Mystery Pavilion, are included after the final chapter of Black Paradox.

=== The Licking Woman ===
Tsuyoshi is walking to his fiancée Miku's house when a mysterious woman attacks him and licks his face and hand. He falls ill and eventually dies, as does Miku's dog, which had licked the woman's saliva off of Tsuyoshi's skin. Tests reveal a bio-toxin in their blood. Soon afterwards, another man is killed by the woman, who has an enormous, infected tongue. Working with the Neighborhood watch, Miku catches the woman as she is attacking a child. She manages to bodily subdue her despite being licked. Miku survives because she washes it off right away; but is psychologically scarred by the incident. The woman is arrested and sent to a mental asylum, with no traces of the toxin found in her tongue or body.

Years later, Miku meets a woman called Nagaoka, who reveals that she was also a victim of the licking woman. Nagaoka tells Miku that the woman disappeared after being released from custody. Miku vows to kill the woman in order to protect others. Nagaoka suggests that Miku cover her skin in deadly potassium cyanide to poison her. Miku tracks her down when the woman starts attacking people again. Once she licks Miku's skin, she collapses because of the cyanide, but manages to physically rip out her own tongue before dying. The severed tongue dives into Miku's throat, almost choking her. She manages to runs away while the severed tongue bounces around on the ground.

Miku then tries to contact Nagaoka, but is unsuccessful. She realizes that the glasses in the woman's handbag looked a lot like those Nagaoka wore. She becomes paranoid, convinced that Nagaoka was the licking woman and she set up the whole thing. Eventually she begins a romance with a new boyfriend. One day, when they kiss, they are attacked by the woman's giant tongue and are found dead, poisoned by the potassium cyanide. Police ignore eyewitness reports of a giant tongue bouncing around at the scene.

=== Mystery Pavilion ===
In the future of 2105, people are queuing to see a genetic recreation of a cormorant, which has long since been extinct. They are told that cormorants were once used to catch fish. However, the "cormorant" in question is an enormous, mutated abomination which promptly demonstrates its fish-catching technique by swallowing two spectators whole. The staff member on-duty orders it to spit them back out, and it does so, but they begin to melt alive as they reach the ground. The spectators look on in horror as the narration notes that "the darkness of the world will continue for a while yet."

== Publication ==
Written and illustrated by Junji Ito, Black Paradox started in the special edition of Shogakukan's seinen manga Big Comic Spirits, Big Comic Spirits Zōkan Casual, on August 15, 2007. The series later continued in YS Special on December 25, 2008, and finished on January 24, 2009. Shogakukan later published the series in a single tankōbon volume, released on March 30, 2009.

In North America, the manga was licensed for English release by Viz Media. The volume was released on October 25, 2022.

== Reception ==
Black Paradox has received mostly positive reviews from critics. Writing for CBR, Dallas Marshall has praised the four main characters, stating that they are "one-of-a-kind in their designs". He also praised how the story handled the subject matter of suicide. Danica Davidson of Otaku USA also praised the manga, saying that it is "creepy and mysterious". She found the twists in the story to be fun and clever, while also praising the visual style.

Christopher Farris of Anime News Network provided a slightly mixed review, praising the plot ideas and visuals while criticizing the horror elements. He highlighted the consistency of the story and praised the plot escalation. Overall he found Black Paradox to be interesting, despite it being a bit uneven compared to Ito's other works.

In 2022, American Library Association included Black Paradox in the official reading list for the 2022 Best Graphic Novels for Adults. In 2023, it was nominated for the Eisner Award for Best U.S. Edition of International Material—Asia.
