= Junji Ito Crimson =

Japanese anime television series

伊藤潤二『クリムゾン』 (Itō Junji Kurimuzon)
- Created by: Junji Ito
- Anime television series
- Licensed by: Crunchyroll

Junji Ito Crimson (Japanese: 伊藤潤二『クリムゾン』, Hepburn: Itō Junji Kurimuzon) is an upcoming Japanese anime television series. The series was announced at Japan Expo 2025 and will adapt various stories from Junji Ito. The theme song is "Karasu Ageha" performed by Yumi Matsutoya. Crunchyroll will stream the series.
