= Yuka Saitō (voice actress) =

Japanese voice actress (born 1986)

- 斉藤 佑圭
- Born: November 13, 1986 (age 39); Fukushima Prefecture, Japan
- Occupation: Voice actress
- Years active: 2008–present
- Agent: Aoni Production
- Spouse: Takeshi Kusao (m. 2015)
- Children: 2
- Website: Official website

Yuka Saitō (斉藤 佑圭, Saitō Yuka; born November 13, 1986 in Fukushima Prefecture) is a Japanese voice actress affiliated with Aoni Production.

== Personal life ==
In May 2015, she married fellow voice actor Takeshi Kusao and they had a child, who was born in 2018.

She announced on her Twitter that she had given birth to a second child on November 13, 2021, which happened to be her 35th birthday.

== Filmography ==
=== Anime ===
2009

- Student Council's Discretion as Chizuru Akaba
- Umineko no Naku Koro ni as Lucifer

2010

- Shiki as Aoi Muto

2011

- Bakugan Battle Brawlers: Gundalian Invaders as Zenet Surrow
- Deadman Wonderland as En
- Shakugan no Shana Final as Hildegard

2012

- Campione! as Ena Seishuin
- High School DxD as Mira
- Sakura Trick as Megumi, Kaede's younger brother
- Ground Control to Psychoelectric Girl as Tōe Ōi, Yamamoto (young)

2014

- Witch Craft Works as Ofuku, Evoque
- The Irregular at Magic High School as Subaru Satomi
- One Piece as Cotton
- A Good Librarian Like a Good Shepherd as Tamamo Sakuraba

2015

- Beautiful Bones: Sakurako's Investigation as Hitoe Madoka

2016

- Gate as Misery
- One Piece as Milky

2017

- The Silver Guardian as Riku Lei
- Dragon Ball Super as Roasie

2018

- Junji Ito Collection as Sayuri Tsujii, Midori Shibayama, Rie, Kinuko Hidaka, Nana Horie, Maiko Hosotani, Yue
- Persona 5: The Animation as Tae Takemi

2019

- Rifle Is Beautiful as Yayoi Hayamine

2022

- Boruto: Naruto Next Generations as Sōsha Amino

2025

- I Want to Escape from Princess Lessons as Brianna

=== Original video animation (OVA) ===
- Baby Princess (2011), Mizore Amatsuka

=== Video games ===
- Ōgon Musōkyoku (2010), Lucifer
- Umineko no Naku Koro ni: Majo to Suiri no Rondo (2010), Lucifer
- Valkyria Chronicles 2 (2010), Lotte Netzel, Sofia Collins
- Rune Factory 4 (2012), Illuminata
- Samurai Warriors: Chronicles 2nd (2012), Naotora Ii
- God Eater 2 (2013), Fran de Bourgogne
- The Idolmaster Million Live! (mobile) (2013), Subaru Nagayoshi
- Toukiden: The Age of Demons (2013), Yuu
- Deception IV: Blood Ties (2014), Laegrinna
- Samurai Warriors 4 (2014), Naotora Ii
- Dead or Alive 5 Last Round (2016), Naotora Ii
- Persona 5 (2016), Tae Takemi
- Samurai Warriors: Spirit of Sanada (2016), Naotora Ii, Yukimura Sanada (child)
- Musou Stars (2017), Naotora Ii, Laegrinna
- Valkyria Chronicles 4 (2018), Karen Stewart
- Arknights (2022), Cantabile
- Blue Archive (2023), Aoi Oki
- Dragon Ball: Sparking! Zero (2024), Roasie
- Azur Lane (2024), USS Pittsburgh
- Girls' Frontline 2: Exilium (2025), Loreley

=== Dubbing ===
- 4.3.2.1., Cassandra
- The Derby Stallion, Tammy McCardle
- Easy A, Marianne Bryant
- Freezer, Alisa
- The Groomsmen, Tina
- The Mentalist, Grace Van Pelt (Amanda Righetti)
- Private Valentine: Blonde & Dangerous, Dolores
- Robin Hood, Marian
- Swamp Shark, Krystal Bouchard
