= Junji Ito =

Japanese horror writer and manga artist (born 1963)

- 伊藤 潤二
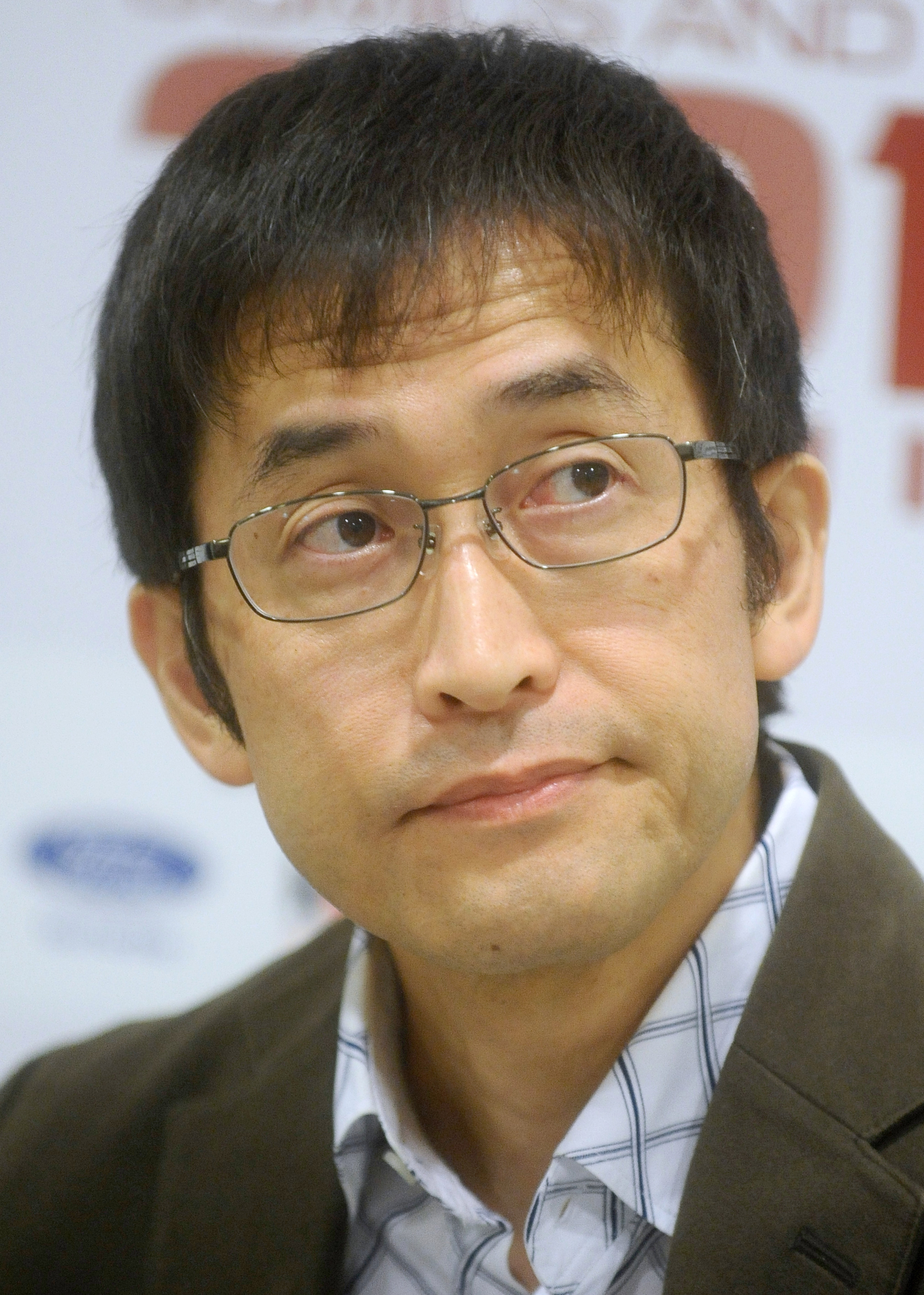
- Ito at Lucca Comics & Games 2018
- Born: July 31, 1963 (age 63); Nakatsugawa, Gifu, Japan
- Occupations: Writer, penciller, inker, manga artist
- Notable work: Tomie; Uzumaki; Gyo
- Spouse: Ayako Ishiguro (m. 2006)
- Children: 2

Junji Ito (Japanese: 伊藤 潤二, Hepburn: Itō Junji; born July 31, 1963) is a Japanese horror manga artist. Some of his most notable works include Tomie, a series chronicling an immortal girl who drives her stricken admirers to madness; Uzumaki, a three-volume series about a town cursed by spirals; and Gyo, a two-volume story in which fish are controlled by a strain of bacteria called "the death stench." His other works include The Junji Ito Horror Comic Collection, a collection of his many short stories, and Junji Ito's Cat Diary: Yon & Mu, a self-parody about him and his wife living in a house with two cats.

Ito's work has developed a substantial cult following, and Ito has been called an iconic horror manga artist. His manga has been adapted to both film and anime television series, including the Tomie film series and both the Junji Ito Collection and Junji Ito Maniac: Japanese Tales of the Macabre anime anthology series.

== Life and career ==
Junji Ito was born on July 31, 1963, in Sakashita, now a part of Nakatsugawa, Gifu. He began his experience in the horror world at a very young age, with his first manga being Mummy Teacher by Kazuo Umezu; his two older sisters read Umezu and Shinichi Koga in magazines, and consequently, he began reading them too. He grew up in the countryside, in a small city next to Nagano. In the house where he lived, the bathroom was at the end of an underground tunnel, where there were spider crickets; such experiences were later reflected in his works.

Ito began to draw manga at the age of 4, taking inspiration from the works he read in magazines. He continued to draw as a hobby until he became a dental technician in 1984, where he struggled to find a balance between the two.

In 1987, he submitted a short story to Monthly Halloween that won an honorable mention in the Kazuo Umezu Prize (with Umezu himself as one of the judges). This story ran for 13 years and was later serialized as Tomie.

Ito drew the cover of Mucc's 2002 album Hōmura Uta. He collaborated with the band again in 2020, for the cover of their made-to-order single "Shōfu 2020". Ito teamed up with Takashi Nagasaki and former diplomat Masaru Sato to create Yūkoku no Rasputin (2010–2012), based on Sato's personal experiences in Russia, for Big Comic.

Film director Guillermo del Toro cited on his official Twitter account that Ito was originally a collaborator for the video game Silent Hills, of which both Del Toro and game designer Hideo Kojima were the main directors. However, a year after its announcement, the project was canceled by Konami, the IP's owner. Ito and Del Toro would later lend their likenesses to Kojima's next project, Death Stranding.

=== Awards ===
Ito's work Uzumaki was nominated for an Eisner Award in 2003 and 2009.

In 2019, Ito received his first Eisner Award for his manga adaptation of Mary Shelley's Frankenstein for "Best Adaptation from Another Medium."

In 2021, Ito received two more Eisner Awards for his works Remina and Venus in the Blind Spot, receiving "Best U.S. Edition of International Material - Asia" and "Best Writer/Artist."

The following year, Ito received another Eisner Award for his work Lovesickness, receiving "Best U.S. Edition of International Material - Asia" for the third time and his fourth Eisner Award."

In 2023, Ito was awarded the Inkpot Award during the annual San Diego Comic-Con.

=== Personal life ===
In 2006, Ito married Ayako Ishiguro (石黒亜矢子), a picture book artist. As of 2025, they have two daughters.

== Inspiration and themes ==
=== Other artists ===
In addition to Kazuo Umezu, and Shigeru Mizuki, Ito has cited Hideshi Hino, Shinichi Koga, Yasutaka Tsutsui, Edogawa Ranpo and H. P. Lovecraft as being major influences on his work. Ito has stated that Umezu has inspired his storytelling, and Hino has inspired his ability in creating a mood for a work. He has also stated that he admires Guillermo del Toro's work. Junji Ito has recommended the manga of Noroi Michiru, stating "I'm always blown away by Noroi Michiru's talent of depicting terror!"

A connection between Lovecraft's work and the spirals of Uzumaki has been placed before, as well as a common theme of cosmic horror.

Ito has also cited H. R. Giger, Salvador Dalí, and others as influences on his work as well.

=== Childhood ===
Ito has been inspired by horror since childhood, with his first manga being written about a protagonist with an eye in the middle of his hand, attacking him; this was heavily influenced by Shigeru Mizuki's Kappa no Sanpei. Ito was inspired by the horror films of the 20th century (such as Dracula and Frankenstein), as well as period dramas of ghosts. He has also found inspiration from Rakugo storytellers who tell Kaiden ghost stories, incorporating it into No Longer Human.

Tomie was inspired by the death of one of his classmates. Ito felt strange that a boy he knew suddenly disappeared from the world, and he kept expecting the boy to show up again; from this came the idea of a girl who is supposed to have died but then just shows up as if nothing had happened. Gyo was influenced by the shark attack scenes from Jaws. The Hanging Balloons was based on a childhood dream. Long Dream was inspired by his sister mentioning research of dreams being instantaneous, and Slug Girl was inspired by Ito moving his tongue around in the mirror and finding that it resembled a slug.

=== Academics ===
Ito studied and graduated from a vocational school with a degree in Dental Technology before working as a dental technician, where he worked for 3 years until he became a full-time mangaka. Ito found anatomical interest in the books for the medical students, which he used to study muscles. He is also cited stating the schooling gave him more inspiration for his tools in drawing, namely pens and how to whittle pencils with the same method as dentures.

=== Themes ===
Ito's work consists of many subgenres of horror, mainly being host to the subgenres of body horror and cosmic horror. Much of his work is based solely in them, with other themes including a relationship of predator to prey, a loss of humanity, apocalyptic scenarios, and obsession being common. The universe Ito depicts is cruel and capricious; his characters often find themselves victims of malevolent unnatural circumstances for no discernible reason or punished out of proportion for minor infractions against an unknown and incomprehensible natural order. He takes inspiration from his own fears as well, including death, war, insects, and being watched.

Ito has been cited saying that he draws the manifestation of the mind becoming reality, represented in body horror.

== Works ==
=== Manga ===
The Junji Ito Horror Comic Collection (collects stories from Monthly Halloween; ComicsOne English editions have flipped pages):
- Volume 1 and 2: Tomie (富江) (does not include Tomie: Again)
- Volume 3: Flesh-Colored Horror (肉色の怪) (collection of six one-shots)
  - Collects: The Long Hair in the Attic, Approval, Beehive, Dying Young, Headless Sculptures, and Flesh-Colored Horror
- Volume 4: The Face Burglar (顔泥棒) (collection of five one-shots)
  - Collects: The Face Burglar, Scarecrow, Falling, Red String, Honored Ancestors, and The Hanging Balloons
- Volume 5: Souichi's Diary of Delights (双一の楽しい日記) (collection of six one-shots)
  - A collection of one-shots featuring Junji Ito's character, Souichi
  - Collects: Fun Summer Vacation, Fun Winter Vacation, Souichi's Diary of Delights, Souichi's Home Tutor, Mannequin Teacher, and Souichi's Birthday
- Volume 6: Souichi's Diary of Curses (双一の呪いの日記) (collection of five one-shots)
  - Sequel collection continuing the Souichi storyline after Souchi's Diary of Delights
  - Collects: Souichi's Selfish Curse, The Room With Four Walls, Coffin, Rumors, and Fashion Model
- Volume 7: Slug Girl (なめくじ少女) (collection of seven one-shots)
  - Collects: Slug Girl, The Thing That Drifted Ashore, Mold, Shiver, The Inn, Groaning Drain Pipes, and Bio House
- Volume 8: Blood-Bubble Bushes (血玉樹) (collection of seven one-shots)
  - Collects: Blood-Bubble Bushes, Unendurable Labyrinth, The Reanimator's Sword, The Will, The Bridge, The Devil's Logic, and The Conversation Room
- Volume 9: Hallucinations (首幻想) (collection of six one-shots)
  - Hallucinations' stories take place in different dimensions, but share the theme of the titular character/s Oshikiri and the interdimensional portal that exists in his/their house
  - Collects: Hallucinations, Bog of the Living Dead, Pen Pal, Intruder, The Strange Tale of Oshikiri, and The Strange Tale of Oshikiri: The Walls
- Volume 10: Marionette Mansion (あやつり屋敷) (collection of seven one-shots)
  - Collects: Ice Cream Bus, Gang House, The Smoking Club, Used Record, Where the Sandman Lives, The Gift Bearer, and Marionette Mansion
- Volume 11: The Town Without Streets (道のない街) (collection of five one-shots)
  - Collects: The Town Without Streets, Near Miss!, Maptown, Village of the Siren, and The Supernatural Transfer Student
- Volume 12: The Bully (いじめっ娘) (collection of seven one-shots)
  - Collects: The Bully, Deserter, A Father's Love, Memory, The Back Alley, Scripted Love, and In The Soil
- Volume 13: The Circus is Here (サーカスが来た) (collection of five one-shots)
  - Collects: The Circus is Here, Gravetown, The Adjacent Window, two The Bizarre Hikizuri Siblings stories The Second Daughter's Lover and The Seance
- Volume 14: The Story of the Mysterious Tunnel (トンネル奇譚) (collection of five one-shots)
  - Collects: The Long Dream, The Story of the Mysterious Tunnel, Bronze Statue, Drifting Spores, and Blood Sickness of the White Sands Village
- Volume 15: Lovesick Dead (死びとの恋わずらい) (five chapters over one volume)
  - Ryusuke returns to the town he once lived in because rumors are swirling about girls killing themselves after encountering a bewitchingly handsome young man. Harboring his own secret from time spent in this town, Ryusuke attempts to capture the beautiful boy and close the case, but...
- Volume 16: Frankenstein (フランケンシュタイン)
  - Junji Ito's manga adaptation of the Mary Shelley novel, Frankenstein; or, The Modern Prometheus
  - Includes two bonus stories: The Hell of Doll Funeral, and Memories of Real Poop

Museum of Terror (collects stories from Monthly Halloween in order of publication):
- Volume 1 and 2: Tomie (富江) (Volume 2 includes Tomie: Again)
- Volume 3: The Long Hair in the Attic (屋根裏の長い髪) (collection of 12 one-shots)
  - Collects: Bio House, Face Thief, Where the Sandman Lives, The Devil's Logic, The Long Hair in the Attic, Scripted Love, The Reanimator's Sword, A Father's Love, Unendurable Labyrinth, Village of the Siren, Bullied, and Deserter
- Volume 4: Scarecrow (案山子) (collections of 12 one-shots)
  - Collects: Red String, Used Record, The Gift Bearer, The Bridge, The Circus is Here, Beehive, Maptown, Headless Sculptures, Dying Young, Shiver, Scarecrow, and The Will
- Volume 5: The Back Alley (路地裏) (collection of 11 one-shots)
  - Collects: The Back Alley, Fashion Model, Falling, The Conversation Room, The Inn, Approval, The Smoking Club, Mold, The Town Without Streets, Memory, and Ice Cream Bus
- Volume 6: Soichi's Selfish Curse (双一の勝手な呪い) (collection of ten one-shots)
  - Reprints The Junji Ito Horror Comic Collection Volumes 5 and 6 (Souichi's Diary of Delights and Souichi's Diary of Curses, respectively), excluding Fashion Model
- Volume 7: Groaning Drain Pipes (うめく配水管) (collection of eight one-shots)
  - Collects: The Supernatural Transfer Student, Groaning Drain Pipes, Blood-Bubble Bushes, The Hanging Balloons, Marionette Mansion, Flesh-Colored Horror, Near Miss!, and In the Soil
- Volume 8: Blood Sickness of the White Sands Village (白砂村血譚) (collection of 11 one-shots)
  - Reprints The Junji Ito Horror Comic Collection Volumes 14: The Story of the Mysterious Tunnel
  - Includes six bonus stories: Gravetown, Gang House, Slug Girl, The Adjacent Window, The Thing That Drifted Ashore, and Honored Ancestors
- Volume 9: Oshikiri Idan & Frankenstein (押切異談&フランケンシュタイン)
  - Reprints The Junji Ito Horror Comic Collection Volumes 9 and 16 (Junji Ito's Hallucinations and Frankenstein, respectively)
  - Includes three bonus stories: The Hell of Doll Funeral, Fixed Face, and Junji Ito's Dog Diary
- Volume 10: Lovesick Dead (死びとの恋わずらい) (five chapters over one volume)
  - Reprinting of The Junji Ito Horror Comic Collection Volume 15: Lovesick Dead
  - Includes bonus stories: Both The Bizarre Hikizuri Siblings stories, The Mansion of Phantom Pain, The Rib Woman, and Memories of Real Poop

Masterpiece Collection:

12-volume collection of Junji Ito's Short Stories. Includes all the short stories in the Museum of Terror Collection as well as some newer stories. These are the volumes upon which Viz Media bases their English releases (Junji Ito Story Collections).

- Volume 1: Tomie: Part 1 (富江) (collection of 9 short stories)
  - Collects: Tomie, Tomie Part 2: Morita Hospital, Basement, Photo, Kiss, Mansion, Revenge, Waterfall Basin, and Painter
- Volume 2: Tomie: Part 2 (富江) (collection of 11 short stories)
  - Collects: Assassins, Hair, Adopted Daughter, Little Finger, Boy, Moromi, Babysitter, Gathering, Passing Demon, Top Model, and Old and Ugly
- Volume 3: Soichi (双一の勝手な呪い) (collection of 10 short stories)
  - Collects: Fun Summer Vacation, Fun Winter Vacation, Soichi's Diary of Delights, Soichi's Home Tutor, Mannequin Teacher, Soichi's Birthday, Soichi's Selfish Curse, The Room With Four Walls, Coffin, and Rumors
- Volume 4: Lovesickness (死びとの恋わずらい) (collection of 10 short stories)
  - Collects: Lovesickness: The Beautiful Boy at the Crossroads, Lovesickness: A Woman in Distress, Lovesickness: Shadow, Lovesickness: Screams in the Night, Lovesickness: The Boy in White, The Bizarre Hikizuri Siblings: Narumi's Boyfriend, The Bizarre Hikizuri Siblings: The Séance, The Mansion of Phantom Pain, The Rib Woman, and Memories of Real Poop
- Volume 5: Deserter (脱走兵のいる家) (collection of 12 short stories)
  - Collects: Bio House, Face Thief, Where the Sandman Lives, The Devil's Logic, The Long Hair in the Attic, Scripted Love, The Reanimator's Sword, A Father's Love, Unendurable Labyrinth, Village of the Siren, Bullied, and Deserter
- Volume 6: Alley (路地裏) (collection of 10 short stories)
  - Collects: Alley, Falling, The Conversation Room, The Inn, Approval, The Smoking Club, Mold, The Town Without Streets, Memory, and Ice Cream Bus
- Volume 7: Statues (首のない彫刻) (collection of 10 short stories)
  - Collects: Red String, The Gift Bearer, The Bridge, The Circus is Here, Beehive, Maptown, Headless Sculptures, Dying Young, Scarecrow, and The Will
- Volume 8: Moan (うめく排水管) (collection of 6 short stories)
  - Collects: The Supernatural Transfer Student, Groaning Drain Pipes, Blood-Bubble Bushes, Flesh-Colored Horror, Near Miss!, and In The Soil
- Volume 9: Tombs (墓標の町) (collection of 9 short stories)
  - Collects: Tombs, Clubhouse, Slug Girl, The Window Next Door, Washed Ashore, The Strange Tale of the Tunnel, Bronze Statue, Floaters, and The Bloody Story of Shirosuna
- Volume 10: Frankenstein (フランケンシュタイン) (collection of 11 short stories)
  - Collects: Frankenstein, Neck Specter, Bog of Living Spirits, Pen Pal, Intruder, The Strange Tale of Oshikiri, The Strange Tale of Oshikiri: The Walls, The Hell of Doll Funeral, Face Firmly in Place, Boss Non-Non, and Hide-and-Seek with Boss Non-Non
- Volume 11: Smashed (新 闇の声 潰談) (collection of 13 short stories)
  - Collects: Bloodsucking Darkness, Ghosts of Prime Time, Roar, Earthbound, Death Row Doorbell, The Mystery of the Haunted House, The Mystery of the Haunted House: Soichi's Version, Soichi's Beloved Pet, In Mirror Valley, I Don't Want to be a Ghost, Library Vision, Splendid Shadow Song, and Smashed
- Volume 12: Shiver (伊藤潤二自選傑作集) (collection of 10 short stories)
  - This volume acts as a greatest hits collection of short stories
  - Collects: Used Record, Shiver, Fashion Model, Hanging Blimp, Marionette Mansion, Painter, The Long Dream, Honored Ancestors, Greased, and Fashion Model: Cursed Frame

Junji Ito Story Collection (reprints Museum of Terror and Voices in the Dark):
- Deserter: Junji Ito Story Collection (脱走兵のいる家) (collection of 12 one-shots)
  - Reprints Museum of Terror Volume 3: The Long Hair in the Attic
- Frankenstein: Junji Ito Story Collection (フランケンシュタイン)
  - Reprints Museum of Terror Volume 9: Oshikiri Idan & Frankenstein
- Lovesickness: Junji Ito Story Collection (死びとの恋わずらい)
  - Reprints Museum of Terror Volume 10: Lovesick Dead
- Smashed: Junji Ito Story Collection (新 闇の声 潰談) (collection of 13 one-shots)
  - Reprints Voices in the Dark and New Voices in the Dark, with the exception of Glyceride (a.k.a. Greased)
- Soichi: Junji Ito Story Collection (双一の勝手な呪い)
  - Reprints Museum of Terror Volume 6: Soichi's Selfish Curse with the exception of Fashion Model
- Tombs: Junji Ito Story Collection (墓標の町) (collection of nine one-shots)
  - Reprints Museum of Terror Volume 8: Blood Sickness of the White Sands Village with the exception of The Long Dream and Honored Ancestors

==== Other works ====
- The Art of Junji Ito: Twisted Visions (異形 世界)
  - A first-ever collection of Junji Ito's artworks, featuring over 130 images from his bestselling manga titles along with rare works. This collection includes Ito's illustrations in both black-and-white and color, from the dreadful beauty of Tomie to the inhuman spirals of Uzumaki. Includes an interview focused on Ito's art technique as well as commentary from the artist on each work.
- Black Paradox (ブラックパラドクス) (six chapters over one volume)
  - Four people intent on killing themselves meet through the suicide website Black Paradox: Maruso, a nurse who despairs about the future; Taburo, a man who is tortured by his doppelganger; Pii-tan, an engineer with his own robot clone; and Baracchi, a girl who agonizes about the birthmark on her face.
  - Includes two bonus stories: The Licking Woman and Mystery Pavilion
- A Diary of Embellished Patches (潤色まだら日記) (collection of three one-shots)
  - Collects: Pond, Conversation, and DIY Instructions
- Dissolving Classroom (溶解教室) (five chapters over one volume)
  - A pair of twisted siblings—Yuuma, a young man obsessed with the devil, and Chizumi, the worst little sister in recorded history—cause all sorts of tragic and terrifying things to happen wherever they go. These scary short stories will shock the reader with a literal interpretation of the ills that plague modern society.
  - Includes two bonus stories: The Return and Children of the Earth
- Fragments of Horror (a.k.a. The Shard of Evil) (魔の断片) (collection of eight one-shots)
  - Collects: Futon, Haunted Wood Mansion, Tomio: Red Turtleneck, Lingering Farewell, Dissection Girl, Black Bird, Nanakuse Magami and Whispering Woman
- Gyo: Ugomeku Bukimi (a.k.a. Fish: Ghastly Squirming) (ギョ うごめく不気味) (19 chapters over two volumes)
  - The floating smell of death hangs over the island. What is it? A strange, legged fish appears on the scene... So begins Tadashi and Kaori's spiral into the horror and stench of the sea.
  - Includes two bonus stories: The Sad Tale of the Principal Post and The Enigma of Amigara Fault
- Junji Ito's Cat Diary: Yon & Mu (伊藤潤二の猫日記 よん&むー) (ten chapters over one volume)
  - Junji Ito, as J-kun, has recently built a new house and has invited his fiancée, A-ko, to live with him. Little did he know, his blushing bride-to-be has some unexpected company in tow—Yon, a ghastly-looking family cat, and Mu, an adorable Norwegian forest cat. Despite being a dog person, J-kun finds himself persuaded by their odd cuteness and thus begins his comedic struggle to gain the affection of his new feline friends.
- The Liminal Zone (幻怪地帯) (collection of four one-shots)
  - Collects: Weeping Woman Way, Madonna, The Spirit Flow of Aokigahara, and Slumber
- The Liminal Zone Vol.2 (幻怪地帯 Vol.2) (collection of four one-shots and sequel to the first volume)
  - Collects: Demon King of Dust, Village of Ether, The Strange Hikizuri Siblings - Uncle Ketanosuke and The Shells of Manjunuma
- Mimi's Tales of Terror (a.k.a. Mimi's Ghost Stories) (ミミの怪談) (collection of six one-shots, adapted from Hirokatsu Kihara and Ichiro Nakayama's Kaidan Shin Mimibukuro (怪談新耳袋))
  - Collects: The Woman Next Door, Sound of Grass, Graveman, The Seashore, Alone with You (a.k.a. Just the Two of Us), and The Scarlet Circle
  - Includes two short chapters: On the Utility Pole and Sign In the Field
  - Includes one bonus story: Monster Prop
- No Longer Human (人間失格) (24 chapters over one volume)
  - Ito's manga adaptation of the Osamu Dazai novel of the same name.
- Rasputin the Patriot (憂国のラスプーチン) (26 chapters over six volumes)
  - Ito's adaptation of ex-diplomat Sato Masaru's autobiography, The Trap of the State.
- Remina (a.k.a. Hellstar Remina) (地獄星レミナ) (six chapters over one volume)
  - This is a horror/sci-fi story about a giant planet-consuming creature from another dimension that a scientist discovers and mistakenly identifies as a planet. Being given the honor to name it as its discoverer, the professor chooses to name it after his only daughter, Remina, but when Hellstar Remina is headed on a direct collision course with Earth, the world goes insane and all the people in the city start a witch hunt to kill Remina, thinking she is somehow to blame.
  - Includes bonus story: Billions Alone (a.k.a. Army of One)
- Sensor (a.k.a. Travelogue of the Succubus) (センサー) (seven chapters over one volume)
  - A woman walks alone at the foot of Mount Sengoku. A man appears, saying he has been waiting for her, and invites her to a nearby village. Surprisingly, the village is covered in hair-like volcanic glass fibers, and all of it shines a bright gold. At night, when the villagers perform their custom of gazing up at the starry sky, countless unidentified flying objects come raining down on them—the opening act for the terror is about to occur.
- Tomie (富江) (20 chapters over one volume)
  - Tomie Kawakami is a femme fatale with long black hair and a beauty mark just under her left eye. She can seduce nearly any man, and drive them to murder as well, even though the victim is often Tomie herself. While one lover seeks to keep her for himself, another grows terrified of the immortal succubus. But soon they realize that no matter how many times they kill her, the world will never be free of Tomie.
  - Does not include Control, Takeover or (the Souichi/Tomie crossover one-shot) Souichi Possessed
- Venus in the Blind Spot (盲点のビーナス) (collection of ten one-shots)
  - Collects: Billions Alone (a.k.a. Army of One), The Human Chair, An Unearthly Love (adapted from the Edogawa Ranpo stories of the same name), Venus in the Blind Spot, The Licking Woman, Umezz Kazuo and Me, How Love Came to Professor Kirida (adapted from Robert Hichen's How Love Came to Professor Guildea), The Enigma of Amigara Fault, The Sad Tale of the Principal Post, and Keepsake
- Voices in the Dark (闇の声) (collection of seven one-shots)
  - Collects: Blood-Slurping Darkness, The Ghost of Golden Time, Roar of Ages, Secret of the Haunted Mansion, Glyceride (a.k.a. Greased), The Earthbound, and Dead Man Calling
- New Voices in the Dark ( 新・闇の声 潰談) (collection of seven one-shots)
  - Collects: The Soichi Front, Soichi's Beloved Pet, In the Valley of Mirrors, Anything but a Ghost, Library of Illusions, Songs in the Dark, and Splatter Film
- Uzumaki (a.k.a. Spiral) (うずまき) (19 chapters over one volume)
  - Kurozu-cho, a small fogbound town on the coast of Japan, is cursed. According to Shuichi Saito, the withdrawn boyfriend of teenager Kirie Goshima, their town is haunted not by a person or being but by a pattern: uzumaki, the spiral, the hypnotic secret shape of the world. It manifests itself in small ways: seashells, ferns, whirlpools in water, whirlwinds in air. And in large ways: the spiral marks on people's bodies, the insane obsessions of Shuichi's father, the voice from the cochlea in your inner ear. As the madness spreads, the inhabitants of Kurozu-cho are pulled ever deeper, as if into a whirlpool from which there is no return...
  - Includes bonus story: Galaxies

==== Specials and Uncollected One-Shots ====
- Demon's Voice
- Ghost Heights Management Association
- Junji Ito's Snow White (adapted from Snow White)
- Layers of Fear
- Mountain of Gods: Precipice of the Unknown
- Mr. Inagawa's Ghost Story Treasure Box
- Return of the Hanging Balloons
- She is a Slow Walker (written for 8 Tales of the ZQN, the I Am a Hero spin-off anthology)
- Soichi Possessed
- Souichi's Junji Ito Exhibition: Enchantment
- The Summer Time Graduation Trip
- Tomie: Takeover
- Tomie: Control

=== Illustrations ===
- Magic: The Gathering
  - Elesh Norn, Mother of Machines (Phyrexia: All Will Be One)
  - Carrion Feeder, Thoughtseize, Doomsday, Plaguecrafter (Secret Lair Drop: Special Guest Junji Ito)
  - A special promotion for hand-signed Elesh Norn, Mother of Machines was held in Japan.
- Doctor! Doctor! - Zerobaseone

== Adaptations ==
Tomie was adapted into a series of films, beginning in 1998. Several other works of Ito's have subsequently been adapted for film, television and videogaming:

- Tomie
  - Tomie (富江), 1998
  - Tomie: Another Face (a.k.a. Tomie: Fearsome Beauty) (富江:アナザフェイス), 1999
  - Tomie: Replay (富江:re-play), 2000
  - Tomie: Re-birth (富江:re-birth), 2001
  - Tomie: The Final Chapter – Forbidden Fruit (富江 最終章?禁断の果実), 2002
  - Tomie: Beginning (富江 BEGINNING), 2005
  - Tomie: Revenge (富江 REVENGE), 2005
  - Tomie vs Tomie (富江 vs 富江), 2007
  - Tomie Unlimited (富江 アンリミテッド), 2011
- The Fearsome Melody (戦慄の旋律), 1991 – (adapted from Used Record)
- Uzumaki (うずまき), 2000 – (adapted from the story of the same name)
- Uzumaki - Television Mystery (うずまき 〜電視怪奇篇〜), 2000 – (adapted from the story of the same name)
- Uzumaki - Curse Simulation (うずまき 〜呪いシミュレーション〜), 2000 – (adapted from the story of the same name)
- Gravetown (墓標の町), 2000 – (adapted from the short story of the same name)
  - With no DVD/VHS release, this work is considered a lost television broadcast
- The Face Burglar (顔泥棒), 2000 – (adapted from the short story of the same name)
- The Hanging Balloons (首吊り気球), 2000 – (adapted from The Devil's Logic, The Long Hair in the Attic, and The Hanging Balloons)
- Long Dream (長い夢), 2000 – (adapted from the short story of the same name)
- Partition (a.k.a. Oshikiri) (押切), 2000 – (adapted from Intruder)
- Scarecrow (案山子), 2001 – (adapted from the short story of the same name)
- Love Ghost (死びとの恋わずらい), 2001 – (adapted from The Junji Ito Horror Comic Collection Volume 15: Lovesick Dead)
- Marronnier (マロニエ), 2004 – (loosely adapted from Marionette Mansion and A Doll's Hellish Burial)
- The Groaning Drain (うめく排水管), 2004 – (adapted from Groaning Drain Pipes)
- Tomio (富夫), 2011 – (adapted from Tomio: Red Turtleneck)
- Gyo: Tokyo Fish Attack, 2012 – (adapted from Gyo: Ugomeku Bukimi)
- Tales of the Bizarre: 2015 Spring Special - The Earthbound (世にも奇妙な物語 スペシャル・春 - 地縛者), 2015 – (adapted from The Earthbound)
- Junji Ito Collection, 2018
- NextDoor, 2021 – (adapted from The Woman Next Door)
- Junji Ito Maniac: Japanese Tales of the Macabre, 2023
- Uzumaki, 2024
- Bloodsucking Darkness, TBD
- Junji Ito Crimson, TBD
