= Junji Ito Collection =

Japanese anime television series

- Poster

伊藤潤二『コレクション』 (Itō Junji "Korekushon")
- Genre: Horror
- Anime television series
- Directed by: Shinobu Tagashira
- Written by: Kaoru Sawada
- Music by: Yuki Hayashi
- Studio: Studio Deen (Note: Animation production assistance (アニメーション制作協力) for all episodes provided by Marvy Jack.)
- Licensed by: Crunchyroll; SEA: Muse Communication
- Original network: Wowow, Tokyo MX
- English network: SEA: Animax
- Original run: January 5, 2018 – May 25, 2018
- Episodes: 12 (24 segments) + 2 OVAs

Junji Ito Collection (Japanese: 伊藤潤二『コレクション』, Hepburn: Itō Junji "Korekushon") is a Japanese anime television adapted from the works of manga artist Junji Ito. Animated by Studio Deen, the anime adapts stories from several of Ito's collections. The series premiered on January 5, 2018, and ran for 12 episodes, accompanied by the release of two OVAs. The series was co-produced and streamed worldwide by Crunchyroll outside of Asia in eight languages on the same day. A follow-up anthology series adapting more of Ito's works, Junji Ito Maniac, was released in 2023.

== Voice cast ==
| Character | Japanese | English |
|---|---|---|
| Fuchi | Mami Koyama | Terri Doty |
| Kota Kawai | Hiro Shimono | Clifford Chapin |
| Oshikiri | Hiro Shimono | Micah Solusod |
| Sugio | Hiro Shimono | Josh Grelle |
| Tomie Kawakami | Rie Suegara | Monica Rial |
| Souichi | Yūji Mitsuya | Austin Tindle |
| Handsome Man at the Crossroads | Hikaru Midorikawa | Daman Mills |
| Yuko | Kaori Nazuka | Kristen McGuire |
| Tamae | Kaori Nazuka | Megan Emerick |
| Mio Fuji | Kaori Nazuka | Megan Shipman |
| Lelia | Kaori Nazuka | Katelyn Barr |
| Miyoko Watanabe | Kaori Nazuka | Kristi Kang |
| Ryou Tsukano | Yūki Kaji | Kiba Walker |
| Yuji | Ryōhei Kimura | Chris Burnett |
| Hiroshi Sakaguchi | Ryōhei Kimura | Matt Shipman |
| Yoshiyuki | Ryōhei Kimura | Kyle Phillips |
| Kiyoshi Kitagawa | Ryōhei Kimura | Jordan Dash Cruz |
| Yasumin | Ryōhei Kimura | Brian Olvera |
| Haruhiko Kitawaki | Nobunaga Shimazaki | Jason Liebrecht |
| Kuroda | Daisuke Namikawa | David Wald |
| Yukihiko Kitawaki | Daisuke Namikawa | John Burgmeier |
| Yamada | Daisuke Hirakawa | Stephen Fu |
| Makoto Tokura | Daisuke Hirakawa | Eric Vale |
| Koichi | Yoshimasa Hosoya | Ricco Fajardo |
| Oda | Yoshimasa Hosoya | Brad Hawkins |
| Shuichi Makita | Yoshimasa Hosoya | Christopher Wehkamp |
| Aoyama | Yoshimasa Hosoya | Jeff Johnson |
| Joe | Yoshimasa Hosoya | Garret Storms |
| Hikaru Shibayama | Yoshimasa Hosoya | Nazeeh Tarsha |
| Kameda | Yoshimasa Hosoya | Marcus Stimac |
| Kuroda | Hiroyuki Yoshino | Brandon McInnis |
| Ryusuke Fukada | Hiroyuki Yoshino | Aaron Dismuke |
| Kishimoto | Hiroyuki Yoshino | Coby Lewin |
| Anzai | Hiroyuki Yoshino | Kyle Igneczi |
| Goro | Hiroyuki Yoshino | Greg Ayres |
| Numake | Kujira | Laurie Steele |
| Tomoka | Natsumi Takamori | Lara Woodhull |
| Setsuko | Romi Park | Jo Lorio |
| Riruko | Romi Park | Anastasia Muñoz |
| Riko | Yōko Hikasa | Alexis Tipton |
| Saiko | Kaori Mizuhashi | Jeannie Tirado |
| Sayuri | Yuka Saito | Amber Lee Connors |
| Midori | Yuka Saito | Amanda Lee |
| Rie | Yuka Saito | Natalie Hoover |
| Kinuko Hidaka | Yuka Saito | Felecia Angelle |
| Nana Horie | Yuka Saito | Emily Neves |
| Maiko | Yuka Saito | Dawn M. Bennett |
| Yue | Yuka Saito | Jad Saxton |
| Hideo | Tomokazu Sugita | Alejandro Saab |
| Marie | Tomoe Hanba | Tia Ballard |
| Yanagida | Kentarō Itō | Barry Yandell |
| Soga | Hitomi Nabatame | Jessica Cavanagh |
| Nakayama | M·A·O | Krystal LaPorte |
| Ogawa | Aya Uchida | Margaret McDonald |
| Risa | Fumiko Orikasa | Caitlin Glass |
| Ringmaster | Masashi Ebara | Philip Weber |
| Mario | Takashi Kondō | Brandon McInnis |
| Young man | Akira Ishida | Adam Gibbs |
| Kana | Maki Shintaku | Leah Clark |
| Mitsuo Mori | Hozumi Gōda | Mike McFarland |
| Masuda | Hiroshi Shimozaki | Ian Ferguson |
| Iwata Tadao | Masakazu Hara | Brian Mathis |
| Iwasaki | Daisuke Kishio | David Matranga |
| Yui | Risa Taneda | Jill Harris |
| Kanako | Akeno Watanabe | Stephanie Young |
| Numata | Naoya Uchida | Keith Kubal |
| Toshio | Toshihiko Seki | Jacob Browning |
| Yuki | Marina Inoue | Amanda Gish |
| Uchida | Yoshihisa Kawahara | Brandon Scheiber |
| Ogi | Setsuji Satō | Chris Guerrero |
| Otsuka | Kenshō Ono | Justin Briner |
| Midori | Mai Nakahara | Dani Chambers |

== Production ==
The anime was first announced June 30, 2017, via Junji Ito's page on the Asahi Shimbun website. In August, the adaptation was confirmed to be a television series with animation by Studio Deen. Shinobu Tagashira, known for his directorial work on Diabolik Lovers, directed and created the character design for the anime. The announcement also revealed that the series would adapt from two of Ito's manga collections, the 11 volume Junji Ito Masterpiece Collection and the single volume Fragments of Horror, but did not specify which stories would be adapted, as the staff wanted viewers to be surprised when the show aired. The series revealed its official title on October 12, 2017, and also announced that Kaoru Sawada was scripting the series, Hozumi Gōda was serving as sound director, and that Yuki Hayashi would compose the music for the series. The series will also include two OVAs, which adapt from Ito's Tomie manga.

The opening theme song, "The Writhing in Agony Blues" (七転八倒のブルース, Shichitenbattō no Burūsu), is performed by The Pinballs, while the ending theme song, "Mutual Universe" (互いの宇宙, Tagai no Uchū), is performed by Jyocho.

== Release ==
The series was initially scheduled to premiere on Tokyo MX on January 7, 2018, but was later announced for a January 5 premiere on WOWOW's Anime Premium programming block. Additionally, the series received an advance showing on December 23, 2017, which was attended by Ito and voice actor Yūji Mitsuya. The series is being simulcast on Crunchyroll worldwide outside of Asia, and Funimation began streaming an English dub on January 20, 2018.

The series ran for 12 episodes and was released as three separate sets on DVD, on March 30, 2018, April 27, 2018, and May 25, 2018. The second and third sets each include an OVA episode.

== Episodes ==
| No. | Title (Note: The English episode titles are taken from Crunchyroll.) | Original release date |
|---|---|---|
| 1 | "Soichi's Convenient Curse" "Hell Doll Funeral" | January 5, 2018 |
| 2 | "Fashion Model" "The Long Dream" | January 12, 2018 |
| 3 | "The Crossroads Boy" "Slug Girl" | January 19, 2018 |
| 4 | "The Chill" "Marionette Mansion" | January 26, 2018 |
| 5 | "Oshikiri's Strange Tales" "Cloth Teacher" | February 2, 2018 |
| 6 | "The Window Next Door" "Gentle Goodbye" | February 9, 2018 |
| 7 | "Used Record" "Town Without Roads" | February 16, 2018 |
| 8 | "Ancestors" "Circus Arrives" | February 23, 2018 |
| 9 | "Painter" "Blood-bubble Trees" | March 2, 2018 |
| 10 | "Glyceride" "Bridge" | March 9, 2018 |
| 11 | "Supernatural Transfer Student" "Scarecrow" | March 16, 2018 |
| 12 | "Sonic Dissociation" "Rumors" | March 23, 2018 |
| OVA–1 | "Tomie Part 1" (Japanese: 「富江」Part1) | April 27, 2018 |
| OVA–2 | "Tomie Part 2" (Japanese: 「富江」Part2) | May 25, 2018 |
