= Dissolving Classroom =

Japanese manga series

- Cover of the volume

溶解教室 (Yōkai Kyōshitsu)
- Genre: Horror
- Manga
- Written by: Junji Ito
- Published by: Akita Shoten
- English publisher: NA: Vertical
- Magazine: Comic Motto!
- Original run: March 18, 2013 – October 1, 2014
- Volumes: 1

Dissolving Classroom (Japanese: 溶解教室, Hepburn: Yōkai Kyōshitsu) is a Japanese horror manga series written and illustrated by Junji Ito. It was serialized in Comic Motto! from March 2013 to October 2014 and published in a single volume in December 2014.

Dissolving Classroom follows Yuuma Azawa, a teen obsessed with worshipping the devil, and his younger sister, Chizumi, as they cause problems everywhere they go. The work contains 5 main chapters as well as two unrelated bonus short stories and a brief comedic afterword.

== Plot ==
=== Dissolving Classroom ===
==== Story ====
Dissolving Classroom is told through a series of connected short stories that follow Yuuma and Chizumi Azawa. Each story revolves around the tragedies Yuuma and Chizumi cause, mainly through Yuuma's apologies, which he is actually using to connect with the Devil. Due to the "evil electromagnetic waves between him and the Devil," Yuuma's apologies, which are usually a result of Chizumi's behavior, make people's brains melt and his compliments cause people to become permanently and horrifically disfigured. Drawn in a Baphomet-esque style, the Devil is repeatedly brought up and is the main source of evil and horror in the manga.

Each chapter focuses on a different aspect of how Yuuma and Chizumi interact with the world, featuring them in various settings including Yuuma's high school, Yuuma's dating life, an apartment complex, Chizumi's first experience with love, and on the run from reporters and police. In each chapter, Yuuma melts people with his apologies, or, in the case of the second chapter, causes them to become disfigured, and Chizumi terrorizes everyone she interacts with. The story culminates in a live broadcast apology from Yuuma which results in everyone who watches it to melt, and the final page of the story shows the cityscape of Tokyo flooded by melted humans, a dripping sky, and a shadowed outline of the Devil

Through Dissolving Classroom, Junji Ito develops a commentary on public apologies as a feature of modern Japanese society which questions the purpose and intent of these public apologies.

==== Chapter list ====
1. "Dissolving Classroom" p. 3-42
  1. The chapter begins with Yuuma Azawa transferring into class 2-B at Hikage Prefectural High School, where he meets Keiko Arisu. Yuuma comes across as strange to his classmates as he introduces himself with an apology and continues to excessively apologize for even the slightest of incidents, which results in him being bullied. Regardless, Yuuma ends up befriending Keiko, who becomes attached to Yuuma and, after a traumatizing encounter which is later explained by Yuuma, wants to help Chizumi. Chizumi is highly resistant to Keiko's attempts at befriending her and ends up terrorizing Keiko more, telling her about Yuuma's connection to the Devil and showing her the Azawa parents' severed heads. Ultimately, Yuuma's apologies result in the brains of everyone at the high school, Keiko's parents, and even Keiko's, melting. Keiko is able to survive due to passing out before her brain could fully melt, but she suffers brain damage and is permanently hospitalized.
2. "Dissolving Beauty" p. 43-58
  1. Starting this chapter, Nao is introduced as she waits at a restaurant to meet her childhood friend who she hasn't seen in two years, Maiko, and Maiko's boyfriend, Yuuma. Nao is shocked upon seeing Maiko's face, which is exaggeratedly ugly, remembering her as a pretty girl when they were in school together, and does not initially believe that Maiko is, in fact, Maiko. Yuuma, however, compliments Maiko's beauty continuously, but when Maiko leaves, he tells Nao he thinks she is more beautiful than Maiko. Shortly after, Nao and Yuuma begin dating. As Yuuma keeps apologizing to her, Nao gets progressively worse looking and is ultimately disfigured, with her eyes hanging out of her eye sockets. At one point, Chizumi finds Nao and harasses her, telling Nao that Yuuma is actually directing his compliments to the Devil and Nao has become ugly as a result. Nao is easily reassured by Yuuma and continues believing she is more beautiful than anyone else even after Yuuma disappears only a couple days later.
3. "Dissolving Apartment" p. 59-88
  1. In this chapter, the Azawa family moves into a small apartment building with several kind neighbors, including a woman named Ogawara, a man name Arashiyama, and an unnamed older woman. The Azawa parents introduce themselves to the neighbors upon moving in, handing out a gift of mochi which, after eating, makes the neighbors very ill. This is overshadowed, however, by the noises and screaming coming from the Azawa's apartment which sound like the Azawa parents verbally and physically abusing their son as he apologizes. The neighbors are concerned and try to confront the Azawa parents but are instead greeted by Chizumi who tells them that her parents have been dead for years. Chizumi later harasses and scares Ogawara, but Ogawara and the unnamed neighbor are still concerned for and sympathetic to her. The neighbors are repeatedly bothered by the noise from the Azawa's apartment, and Ogawara and the unnamed neighbor keep trying to help Chizumi and Yuuma. Eventually, while they are spending time with Chizumi, they feel drips from the ceiling that Chizumi tells them is Arashiyama finally melting. When they try to check on Arashiyama, they receive no answer and end up trying to check on Yuuma, who they find being attacked by his parents, both parents almost completely melted. As the parents finish melting, Chizumi tells Ogawara and the unnamed neighbor that Yuuma is possessed by the devil and has actually been calling their parents back from Hell to repeatedly melt them. At this moment, Ogawara and the other neighbor start melting until only their heads and bones are left. Chizumi proclaims that it is time for her and Yuuma to move again as Yuuma remains lying in the ooze of the melted bodies.
4. "Chizumi in Love" p. 89-120
  1. The fourth chapter begins with Tomohito, a young boy around Chizumi's age, narrating how a rumor has been going around school recently about a strange girl who threatens people on the sidewalk, after which her brother will show up to apologize for his sister's behavior. After the brother's apologies, the victim will disappear, leaving only a stain. After school, Tomohito runs into Chizumi on his walk home, whereupon she tackles Tomohito to the ground, licking his face and calling him cute, all while Yuuma watches on. Yuuma confronts Chizumi later, initially enraged and trying to kill her. Once Yuuma calms, he observes that Chizumi seems to have been very happy recently and asks if she was in love. Meanwhile, Tomohito has been traumatized from the event and is terrified that the second half of the school rumor will come true, which it ultimately does. Having been faced with Yuuma's apologies, Tomohito's parents begin to melt and Tomohito runs for help, unfortunately running into first Chizumi and then Yuuma, who acts as if he will help Tomohito. Yuuma brings Tomohito to his house and "introduces" Tomohito to Chizumi. Tomohito tries to run but is tied up and kept in the house for Chizumi to harass. Eventually, the bottles of melted people that the Azawa siblings keep are able to knock themselves over, instructing Tomohito to use the grease to escape the ropes. Tomohito escapes, running to the police, and the Azawa's house is later found to be empty.
5. "Interview with the Devil" p. 121-160
  1. In the final chapter, the scene begins with a news reporter, Hamaoka, pushing Keiko Arisu through a forested area to a dilapidated house they are hoping to find the Azawa siblings in. Hamaoka enters the building and talks to Yuuma, proclaiming he's trying to find the cause behind the recent incidents appearing where people's brains have melted. When trying to have Yuuma talk to Keiko, Keiko screams when Yuuma apologizes to her. Chizumi then appears, detailing Yuuma's powers and his connection to the devil. Yuuma unsuccessfully tries to defuse the situation, and Hamaoka flees with Keiko. After getting Keiko to the car, Hamaoka returns to the house, but Yuuma and Chizumi have fled. Hamaoka keeps investigating and is able to find the siblings again by having Keiko point at a spot on a map of Japan. Hamaoka requests for Yuuma to come forward and give an explanation, but Yuuma flees with Chizumi again. Three days later, Yuuma and Chizumi appear at Hamaoka's work, and a broadcast is planned. Hamaoka goes to retrieve Keiko for the broadcast, and it is revealed that Hamaoka is actually the Devil and is excited for Yuuma's upcoming public apology. As soon as the broadcast starts, Yuuma gives continuous intense apologies, until everyone has melted and the ooze from upstairs seeps through to cover Yuuma and Chizumi. Afterwards, it is narrated that the broadcast was spread around on social media, but what happened to the watchers and the Azawa siblings is up to the reader's imagination.

=== Bonus Stories ===
==== "The Return" ====
Only six pages, "The Return" is a very brief story about a man named Mitsuo searching for his fiancée, Yuka, after she dies, her final words being a promise to return to him. Mitsuo is able to feel Yuka's presence and is confused to realize her presence seems to follow the rotation of the Earth. Eventually, he hears Yuka's voice, and follows it to watch a meteor land nearby. Charred human bones are found at the site of impact, and Mitsuo knows that Yuka was alive inside the meteor up until she entered the atmosphere. Ending the short story, Mitsuo finds a charred hand with Yuka's engagement ring and welcomes her back.

==== "Children of the Earth" ====
Also six pages, "Children of the Earth" is about a group of kindergarten students that go missing. Their families search for them and end up finding them stuck in the ground. When they try to pull the silent children out of the ground, their torsos extend into a long trunk, so they do not come out of the holes. After being pulled partially out of the ground, they are then rapidly dragged back into the holes until they disappear entirely, and the children are never found again.

=== Afterword ===
In an amusing one-page comic, Juunji Ito draws Yuuma, though this time he is presented as the actor, Jirou Yamada, who played Yuuma. He brings up the recent trend of public apologies and invites the reader to start doing their own public apology for whatever reason they think of. Chizumi is also drawn, although she only says that she is Chizumi and acted as Chizumi.

== Characters ==
=== Dissolving Classroom ===
- Yuuma Azawa: Yuuma is one of the main characters of Dissolving Classroom, a teenage boy in his second year of high school. Yuuma is considered a serious and handsome boy by the people he meets; however, he actually worships the Devil and causes many deaths throughout the manga. Yuuma can melt people's brains with his apologies or make them horrifically ugly with his compliments. As described by his sister, Yuuma derives pleasure from his apologies and is a masochist. Although people can be uncomfortable with his intense apologies, they will sometimes end up feeling pleasure from the apologies.
- Chizumi Azawa: Chizumi is another main character in Dissolving Classroom and is Yuuma's younger sister. Chizumi is generally regarded as strange or scary looking and is shown to have her own kind of supernatural abilities. Chizumi is supernaturally athletic, has long and sharp nails, and an unnaturally long tongue. Chizumi drinks the melted people after Yuuma has apologized to them enough. Chizumi and Yuuma are shown to have a strange relationship as they are both frequently mean to each other, but Yuuma will go out of his way to help Chizumi with what she wants.
- Keiko Arisu: Keiko first appears as girl in Yuuma's high school class, and initially befriends Yuuma and attempts to befriend Chizumi. Keiko is one of the main characters for the first chapter and appears again later in the last chapter as someone important to the investigation on Yuuma and Chizumi. Keiko suffers significant brain damage as a result of Yuuma's apologies at the end of the first chapter and is hospitalized and uses a wheelchair for the rest of the story.
- Hamaoka/The devil: Hamaoka first appears as the news reporter investigating Yuuma and Chizumi working together with Keiko. However, it is later revealed that Hamaoka is actually the Devil in disguise, pushing Yuuma towards a broadcast public apology.
- Nao: Nao is a main character in the second chapter is Yuuma's girlfriend for the duration of the chapter. Nao originally meets Yuuma as her childhood friend's boyfriend, but he breaks up with her friend to be with Nao. Nao becomes extremely ugly and disfigured over the course of the chapter due to Yuuma's compliments but is left believing she is more beautiful than anyone else.
- Ogawara: Ogawara is one of the Azawa's neighbors in the third chapter. She is concerned for Chizumi and Yuuma while they stay at the apartment since she can hear the Azawa parents abusing Yuuma and attempts to help the siblings. Later on, in the fourth chapter, the bottle of ooze labeled with her name talks to the other bottles and knocks herself over to help Tomohito escape.
- Arashiyama: Arashiyama is another of the Azawa's neighbors in the third chapter. He is also concerned for Chizumi and Yuuma, though less so than Ogawara and the other neighbor. He also appears as a bottle of ooze in the fourth chapter.
- Unnamed Neighbor: Another of the Azawa's neighbors is an older woman, although she is never named. She is also greatly concerned for Chizumi and Yuuma and works with Ogawara in attempts to help the siblings. Since her name is not given in the chapter, it is not certain that she appears in the fourth chapter as a bottle of ooze, although it is likely she is and has a conversation with Ogawara about helping Tomohito as a bottle of ooze.
- Tomohito: Tomohito is one of the main characters of the fourth chapter and is about Chizumi's age. Tomohito is Chizumi's first love and is kidnapped by Yuuma for Chizumi as a result. Tomohito escapes Yuuma and Chizumi initially but is briefly shown in the last chapter dead with his throat cut, presumably by Chizumi with her nails.
- The Azawa Parents: The Azawara parents are present mainly in chapter three but are also mentioned and shown as severed heads in other chapters. As Chizumi explains, Yuuma repeatedly calls the Azawa parents up from Hell just to melt them again. The Azawa parents abuse Yuuma severely and attempt to kill him just before they melt in chapter three.
- Maiko: Maiko is Nao's childhood friend in chapter two and is initially Yuuma's girlfriend. She is exaggeratedly ugly while present, which confuses Nao as she remembers Maiko as a pretty girl. Maiko stalks Yuuma and Nao after being broken up with, and although Nao can't remember exactly why Maiko stopped, it is implied that she died from Yuuma's apologies.
- Tomohito's parents: Tomohito's parents are present briefly for the third chapter, reassuring Tomohito when he is scared, before they ultimately die due to Yuuma's apologies.
- Keiko's parents: Keiko's parents are present for the first chapter, taking care of Keiko in the hospital after Chizumi scares her into traffic. They are also some of the first to show symptoms of their brains melting in the first chapter and die as a result.
- Mita and crew: Mita and his crew are students at Yuuma's high school in chapter one, who bully Yuuma due to his constant apologizing. They, along with the rest of the high school except Keiko, die due to Yuuma's apologies.
- Mori: Mori is the editor and chief at the news station Hamaoka works at. He is present for the last chapter and helps set up the broadcast of Yuuma's public apology.

=== Bonus Stories ===
- Mitsuo: Mitsuo is the main character of the bonus short story "The Return." He is awaiting his wife's return after her death and can feel her presence as she moved around the Earth in a meteorite.
- Yuka Tanigawa: Yuka is Mitsuo's wife in "The Return." She promises to come back to Mitsuo and does appear in a meteorite that lands on Earth; however, she is charred as the meteorite goes through the Earth's atmosphere.
- Various children: Multiple children appear in "Children of the Earth" stuck in holes; however, they seem to be empty shells.
- Various parents: Multiple parents appear in "Children of the Earth" looking for their missing children. They are successful in finding the children but cannot retrieve them from the Earth.

== Development ==
Beginning release in 2013, Dissolving Classroom is greatly different to many of Junji Ito's previous works, departing from Junji Ito's more frequent style of Lovecraftian horror. However other aspects of his general process can be seen in Dissolving Classroom. For instance, Junji Ito mentions in an interview that mood and atmosphere are what he considers most important to writing horror stories, which can be seen in this manga as he develops the characters feelings and interactions with Yuuma and Chizumi. In another interview, Junji Ito talks about his interest as rumors as part of spreading horror, which can also be seen in Dissolving Classroom with Tomohito who is afraid due to the rumors about Yuuma and Chizumi that he has heard.

== Publication ==
Written and illustrated by Junji Ito, Dissolving Classroom began serialization in Comic Motto! on March 18, 2013. The series completed its serialization on October 1, 2014, the same day Comic Motto! published its final issue. The publishing company Akita Shoten collected the individual chapters into a single tankōbon volume, which was released on December 19, 2014.

In February 2016, Vertical announced they licensed the series for English publication, and the volume was released on January 31, 2017.

== Reception ==
Dissolving Classroom has received mostly positive praise since its release; however, it has also received some negative reviews.

Several sources felt Dissolving Classroom was a unique and interesting read. Danica Davidson from Otaku USA praised the manga due to what Davidson felt was unique horror, especially when compared to previous works by Ito. Nathan Wilson from ICv2 had a similar opinion, praising the series as a good introduction into works by Ito. Katherine Dacey from Manga Critic praised the artwork and plot as coherent and provocative. Ricardo Serrano Denis from Comics Beat praised the horror in the story as unique and unusual among horror works.

In contrast, some sources have felt that Dissolving Classroom did not live up to their standards. In a review on World Literature Today, the manga was described as subpar in the horror development as compared to Junji Ito's other work. At San Diego Comic-Con 2018, a "Best and Worst Manga" panel included the series in their "Worst Manga for Anyone, Any Age" picks of the year.
