= Junji Ito's Cat Diary: Yon & Mu =

Manga series

- Volume cover

伊藤潤二の猫日記 よん&むー (Itō Junji no Neko Nikki: Yon & Mū)
- Genre: Autobiographical
- Manga
- Written by: Junji Ito
- Published by: Kodansha
- English publisher: NA: Kodansha USA
- Magazine: Monthly Magazine Z
- Original run: 26 November 2007 – 26 December 2008
- Volumes: 1

Junji Ito's Cat Diary: Yon & Mu (Japanese: 伊藤潤二の猫日記 よん&むー, Hepburn: Itō Junji no Neko Nikki: Yon & Mū) is an autobiographical manga written and illustrated by Junji Ito. Appearing as a serial in Kodansha's seinen manga magazine Monthly Magazine Z from November 2007 to December 2008, it follows the adventures of J-kun, a horror manga artist as he adjusts to life with cats: Yon, whom his fiancėe brings along to their new house, and Mu, a Norwegian Forest cat whom the couple adopts as a kitten. Junji Ito's Cat Diary draws on autobiographical elements of Ito's personal experience with cats. Publisher Kodansha compiled the ten installments of the manga into a bound volume and released it in March 2009.

Kodansha Comics USA published an English-language translation of Junji Ito's Cat Diary in October 2015, which also included the contributions of Ito and his wife to the 2011 collection Teach Me, Michael! A Textbook in Support of Feline Disaster Victims. Upon publication, the manga received a favorable critical and commercial response, debuting in The New York Times's weekly list of the ten best-selling manga volumes. It received generally positive reviews from critics, who enjoyed it as a cat-centered manga whose humor was derived from the emphasis on the behavior of the cat caretaker, rather than the cat. Critical discussions have centered around Ito's use of realism and exaggerated horror to elicit moments of comedy, the manga's relationship to previous works by Ito, and how the artwork depicts the relationship between cats and their caregivers.

== Plot ==
Junji Ito's Cat Diary: Yon & Mu is an autobiographical manga that draws on manga artist Junji Ito's personal experience with cats. It features various anecdotes about living with cats, which center on J-kun, a horror manga artist (Ito's stand-in); his fiancée, A-ko (his wife Ayako Ishiguro's stand-in); her family cat, Yon ("Four"); and a Norwegian Forest cat, Mu ("Six").

- "Mu Appears" opens with J-kun's move to a new home with A-ko. While J-kun wrestles with his apprehension over living with Yon, A-ko adopts a kitten to keep Yon company. She names the kitten Mu, since he will be the sixth cat her family has kept, with her mother's cat, Goro, being the fifth. J-kun is eventually won over by Mu.
- In "Yon Attacks," J-kun dreads the arrival of Yon, whom he believes has cursed skull markings on his back. After Yon's stress-induced illness, however, J-kun accepts him as a member of the family.
- "Battle of the Cat Wand" centers on J-kun's unsuccessful attempts to play with the cats.
- In "The Events of One Late Night," J-kun tries to bribe the cats to sleep on his bed, rather than A-ko's, to no avail.
- In "Yon is a Weird Cat," J-kun, while finishing his manga on a tight deadline one night, imagines that Yon transforms into various beings, including a slug, the supernatural snake-like creature tsuchinoko, and an elderly man. To J-kun's surprise, this leads to an encounter that he hopes isn't a hallucination.
- "Yon's Great Escape" centers on Yon's escape from the house. Both J-kun and A-ko search for him, eventually retrieving him from a storehouse.
- "King Yon" chronicles Yon's further unsuccessful attempt to escape, his unusual strength, and his position as dominant cat within the household.
- "In "Mu's Castration," the couple takes Mu to the veterinarian to be neutered. Despite a brief medical scare, Mu survives.
- "Unidentified Creature" centers on a visit from A-ko's parents and Goro, the timid cat they bring along. J-kun initially mistakes Goro for a spirit, while the other cats quickly take a liking to Goro.
- In "Tread Not on Poop, Snot, or Cat," J-kun pranks A-ko with fake cat excrement, only to accidentally pick up real cat vomit thinking that it was A-ko's revenge.

== Style ==
J-kun attempts to play with the cats, to no avail; his mouth becomes more horrific as he fails to capture their interest.

Ito used two main artistic styles throughout the manga: a realistic one and a horror-tinged one of exaggeration. Joe McCulluch of The Comics Journal wrote that Ito's transitions between these two styles provided the foundational humor of the manga, in that Ito punctuates scenes of realistically drawn domesticity with exaggerated moments of stylized horror. For example, one scene in which J-kun attempts to play with the cats starts within Ito's realistic style, only to have J-kun quickly devolve visually into a monster as he becomes more upset that the cats respond to his wife's attempts at playing with them but not his; his features become exaggerated and horrific, while the cats, however, lose their sense of motion and activity from earlier and become "stiffly realistic" at his failed attempts to play with them. Anime News Network's Rebecca Silverman wrote that Ito's realistic art worked to make the cats endearing, while the moments of horrific art served as comedy.

Austin Price, another writer for The Comics Journal, remarked that Junji Ito's Cat Diary incorporates the "conceits and styles" of his earlier manga, such as narrative tone and body horror, to act as a parody of them. According to Price, only the everyday narrative of Junji Ito's Cat Diary delineated it from Ito's earlier works, which suggested to him that a degree of authorial humor was present in Ito's works; Price raised the possibility that "Ito’s work was itself a kind of grand joke."

Other critics focused on the art's relationship to depictions of pet caretaking. Josiah Stoup of Otaku USA suggested that Ito's art caricatured "the intense emotions that a pet owner feels," with both the cats and J-kun alternatively being frightened by the other. Stroup interpreted J-kun's periodically monstrous form as how his overwhelming affection appeared sometimes to the cats. Silverman wrote that A-ko's terrifying appearance reflected her love for her cats, in that she appeared "as creepy as many of us cat owners fear we do." A-ko's appearance, with her almost entirely white eyes, has also been noted to share similarities with yokai, supernatural Japanese entities.

== Development and publication ==
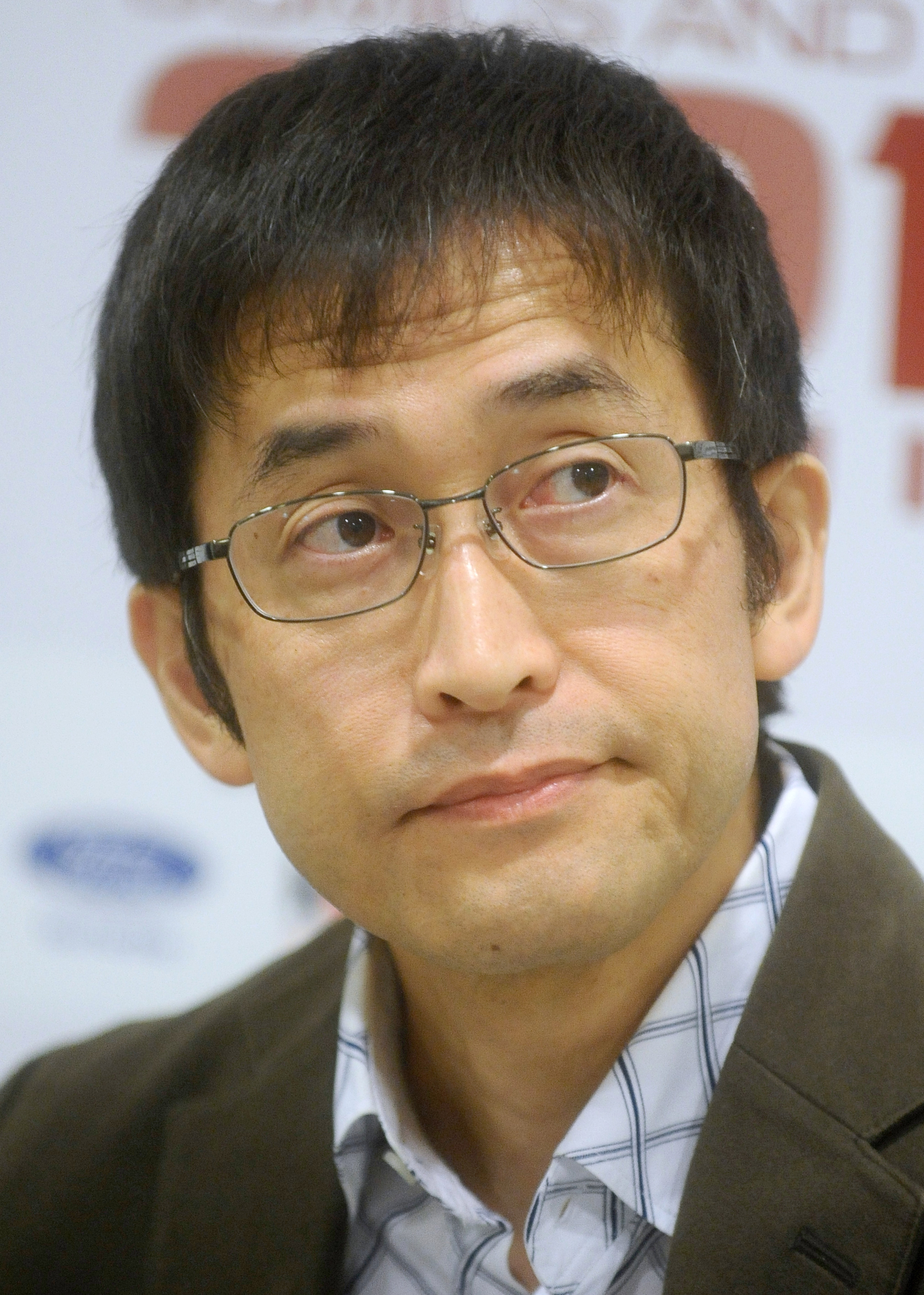
Junji Ito in 2018

Best known for his horror manga Tomie, Lovesick Dead, Uzumaki, and Souichi, Ito was approached by his editor to write a manga about cats, after the editor correctly deduced that Ito had recently acquired a cat through a change in his artwork. Previously, Ito had drawn cats as frightening but had recently drawn a "very cute" cat in a way that appeared to capture the "essence" of cats, thus convincing the editor. Ito used the opportunity to draw on his anecdotes of living with the cats, and his wife advised him on the manga's storyboards and depicting the personalities of the cats. Ito's sister asked that her own longhair cat, Ran-chan, be included in the manga, but he did not have the space for it. His wife was generally fine with her depiction in the manga, but disliked that Ito drew her stand-in with very small pupils and striped pants.

Junji Ito's Cat Diary appeared as an intermittent serial in Kodansha's seinen manga magazine Monthly Magazine Z from 26 November 2007 to 26 December 2008. Kodansha collected the ten installments into a bound volume and published it on 13 March 2009. Kodansha USA announced that it had obtained the manga's license at the 2015 Anime Boston convention, and published the English-language translation in North America on 27 October 2015. The English-language edition also included the pieces contributed by Ito and his wife for Teach Me, Michael! A Textbook in Support of Feline Disaster Victims (2011), a book which was intended to raise support for cat shelters after the Great Tohoku Earthquake. Their contributions consist of Ito's comic, "Yon Went to Heaven," and his wife's letter chronicling the death of Yon from heart failure on 3 February 2011, about a month before the earthquake, and their subsequent grieving. Junji Ito's Cat Diary has also been translated into French by Tonkam, Italian by Panini Comics, and Ukrainian by uk:Мольфар Комікс.

== Reception ==
Junji Ito's Cat Diary: Yon & Mu was favorably received by English-language readers, charting in the fourth spot on The New York Times's weekly list of the ten best-selling manga volumes upon publication. In general, the manga was also positively received by critics. Reviewers enjoyed the narrative as a lighthearted window into pet caretaking, where the humor derived from the caretaker's response to the cats, rather than the cats' behavior. Children's librarian Marissa Lieberman wrote that, because of the overlap in the importance of narrative pacing and timing in both comedy and horror, Ito's previous work in horror and gag manga helped to make Junji Ito's Cat Diary unique among other cat-centered manga. Ito's two styles of artwork were generally seen as complementing the narrative nicely, with highlights being the characters of Mu and Yon, the range of character facial expressions, and the timing and content of the gags. The perceived potential audience for the manga was a point of discussion within the reviews, with several critics writing that the manga would appeal mainly to cat caretakers and fans of the author. Faustine Lillaz of Planete BD, in contrast, wrote that the humor of the manga would have a wide appeal.
