= Remina =

Japanese manga series

- Tankōbon volume cover, featuring Remina Oguro

地獄星レミナ (Jigokusei Remina)
- Genre: Apocalypse; Horror; Science fiction
- Manga
- Written by: Junji Ito
- Published by: Shogakukan
- English publisher: NA: Viz Media
- Magazine: Big Comic Spirits Zōkan Casual
- Original run: September 16, 2004 – July 24, 2005
- Volumes: 1
- icon

Remina (Japanese: 地獄星レミナ, Hepburn: Jigokusei Remina; lit. 'Hellstar Remina') is a Japanese manga series written and illustrated by Junji Ito. It was serialized in Big Comic Spirits Zōkan Casual from September 2004 to July 2005, and published in one tankōbon volume. The story is about the discovery of a sentient, world-eating planet that is about to consume Earth, and the ensuing mass panic centered on a young girl whom the planet was named after.

== Plot ==
In a futuristic Tokyo, Professor Oguro wins the Nobel Prize for discovering a wormhole in the Hydra constellation, from which a rogue planet has emerged 16 light-years away from Earth. Oguro names the planet Remina after his daughter, whose birth coincided with the planet's appearance. The planet moves erratically and occasionally surpasses light speed, but nearby stars mysteriously vanish. Remina becomes a celebrity after receiving public approval following the planet's discovery, reluctantly embracing her fame by joining a talent agency and becoming the spokeswoman for the Mineishi Construction company. During a tour of the Mineishi family home, she learns of a secret bomb shelter and the family's estranged son, who left to pursue his dream of becoming an astronaut against his father's wishes.

Meanwhile, Professor Oguro learns from a terrified astronomer that Planet Remina has entered the Solar System and will reach Earth within a month. Despite Professor Oguro's attempts to ask for hard proof, the astronomer frantically claims that he "met its eye" before succumbing to madness. The rumor of an impending collision fuels public panic, and as the planet devours other planets, including Mars, with a giant tongue-like appendage, many believe the Oguros summoned the planet, linking their fame and fortune to its destructive approach. The riot and paranoia begin to escalate as Tokyo descends into chaos, with mobs targeting Remina. She flees with her agent Mitsumura, fan club president Goda, and Kunihiro, the Mineishi heir, as the planet looms in Earth's sky.

A lunar probe sent to investigate Planet Remina discovers its "volcano" is a massive eye, but accidentally loses contact after an emergency landing. A masked cult hijacks a news broadcast, demanding the Oguros' elimination to save Earth. As Remina and her group flee, Kunihiro abandons the group, and Mitsumura is fatally stabbed while shielding Remina, the two confessing their mutual love for each other. The mob captures Remina and Goda, and they crucify Remina alongside a beaten Professor Oguro, who dies pleading for Remina's forgiveness.

As Planet Remina devours the Moon and targets Earth, a missile strike repels its tongue but devastates Tokyo, allowing Goda to free Remina. Grief-stricken, Remina fails to acknowledge Goda's effort, and she rebukes his violence against Kunihiro when they encounter him, pushing Goda to leave. Kunihiro takes Remina to his family's home, where his parents plan to escape the Earth in a secret government rocket to Planet Remina. When Kunihiro's parents forbid him from taking Remina along, he and Remina shut themselves into the bomb shelter, where Kunihiro sexually assaults Remina. Kunihiro's parents happen upon the scene and immediately believe their son when he claims that Remina seduced him. They throw Remina to a waiting mob led by a whip-wielding cultist.

An earthquake caused by Planet Remina's gravitational pull stalls the mob, but Remina and Daisuke, a homeless man whom she meets, are captured and tortured. When the planet's tongue reemerges, Remina and Daisuke are tied to the same cross, which the mob sets alight. They are spared when the planet's lick sends Earth into a rapid rotation, dispersing the mob. The cultist cuts Daisuke and Remina free, only to take Remina for himself. The centrifugal force of the Earth's spin lowers the planet's gravity, allowing the populace to make great bounds and fly across the planet. Daisuke takes Remina back in a struggle, but the cultist alerts the surviving humans to Remina's location, resulting in a massive airborne chase. Meanwhile, the government rocket, carrying the Mineishis and VIPs, crashes on Planet Remina's hostile surface, where the atmosphere gruesomely transforms an injured passenger when his helmet is removed. The planet's tongues kill other survivors, including the Mineishis.

Earth's spin slows, causing the airborne humans to crash-land back in Japan. Daisuke and Remina, cushioned by bodies, bring some young and innocent survivors along to the Mineishi estate as Planet Remina begins pulling in the Earth. During their attempt to enter the house, the cultist attacks Remina and is unmasked as Goda, who voices his resentment of her love for Mitsumura before being swept away. The group enters the bomb shelter, which detaches from Earth before Planet Remina finally devours it and disappears into the void. When Remina awakens, Daisuke reveals himself to be the Mineishis' estranged son, who failed in his goal to become an astronaut. With supplies for a year, he optimistically hopes for another miracle. Remina gazes outside the shelter's window and reflects on the loss of her father and Mitsumura as the shelter drifts across the empty void of space.

== Publication ==
The series is written and illustrated by Junji Ito. It was serialized in Big Comic Spirits Zōkan Casual from September 16, 2004, to July 24, 2005. Shogakukan published the series in a single tankōbon volume, which was released in Japan on June 22, 2015.

In 2020, Viz Media announced they licensed the series for English publication. They released the volume on December 15, 2020.

== Reception ==
Nick Smith from ICv2 praised the series, stating it was "handled well". Helen Chazan from The Comics Journal also praised the series, calling it "immensely appealing" and "relatable". Ian Wolf from Anime UK News also praised the series, stating that it felt like something new from Ito, while also giving the horror he is known for. Michelle Smith from Manga Bookshelf was more critical, stating that she was intrigued by the premise, but found the series to be "unaffecting". As part of Anime News Network's Fall 2020 manga guide, Rebecca Silverman and Caitlin Moore reviewed the series. Silverman praised the series, calling it a "good, chilling story", while criticizing it for being "too on the nose with its imagery". Moore stated that she also enjoyed the series, but was left confused by the plot.

In December 2020, the series ranked in the top ten of the adult graphic novels in the United States list by The NPD Group. It also ranked on the top ten of The New York Times Best Sellers list in the graphic books and manga category in January 2021. In the same year, the series won the Eisner Award for Best U.S. Edition of International Material—Asia and was nominated for the Harvey Award. In 2022, it was ranked in the top ten graphic novels by the American Library Association's Graphic Novels and Comics Round Table.
