= Sensor (manga) =

Japanese manga series

- Cover of the collected volume

センサー (Sensā)
- Genre: Horror; Science fiction
- Manga
- Written by: Junji Ito
- Published by: Asahi Sonorama
- English publisher: NA: Viz Media
- Magazine: Nemuki+
- Original run: August 10, 2018 – August 10, 2019
- Volumes: 1

Sensor (Japanese: センサー, Hepburn: Sensā), also known as Travelogue of the Succubus (夢魔の紀行, Muma no Kikō), is a Japanese manga series written and illustrated by Junji Ito. It was serialized in Nemuki+ from August 2018 to August 2019 and published in a single volume in November 2019.

While thinking of ideas for the book, Ito eventually settled on making a more character-driven narrative, since he had not tried doing one much before. While working on the book, Ito did not know how the story would end, instead opting to piece together the story while following the characters.

Upon its international releases, the book has been successful, both critically and commercially. Many critics offered praise for the artwork and the story, often comparing it to works of H. P. Lovecraft. On the commercial end, the book has ranked well in multiple best seller lists and was nominated for an award at the Angoulême International Comics Festival.

== Synopsis ==
Kyoko Byakuya encounters a man who claims to have awaited her arrival during a hiking trip on the Sengoku Mountain and extends an invitation to visit a nearby village. To her astonishment, the Kiyokami Village is enveloped in hair-like volcanic glass fibers that radiate a striking golden hue, which turns out to be the physical manifestation of their god, "Lord Amagami."

As night falls, Kyoko, along with the villagers, participate in a tradition of gazing at the starry sky, during which they witness the descent of numerous unidentified flying objects, and the angel hair begins to rain down. This mesmerizing event is abruptly interrupted by a mysterious dark cloud and cosmic entity that emerged from the eruption of a nearby volcano.

60 years later, an investigation reporter, Wataru Tsuchiyado, takes a trip to the Sengoku Mountain to uncover the fate of Kyoko, who survived the volcanic eruption but mysteriously vanished shortly thereafter. However, his investigation takes a dark turn when he and Kyoko are captured by "Indigo Shadow," a cult that unravels the mysteries of the universe, who intend to sacrifice her as part of a ritual aimed at ushering darkness across the prefecture.

== Development ==
Before starting serialization, Junji Ito had a discussion with his editor over the main theme of the story. They eventually settled on making a more character-driven narrative, since it was something that Ito had not tried much in the past. Upon starting the series, Ito did not have a specific idea for its ending, often just piecing the story together as it went, following along with the characters. Ito would often find this approach resulting in unexpected ideas helping to drive the story forward.

== Publication ==
Written and illustrated by Junji Ito, the series began serialization in Nemuki+ on August 10, 2018. The series completed its serialization on August 10, 2019. The individual chapters were collected into a single tankōbon volume, which was released by Asahi Sonorama on November 7, 2019.

In October 2020, Viz Media announced they licensed the series for English publication. They released the volume on August 17, 2021.

== Reception ==
=== Critical response ===
Briana Lawrence from The Mary Sue praised the book for its premise and for having all the small details matter in the end. Evan Mullicane from Screen Rant also offered it praise, specifically stating that the book has a compelling mystery in addition to horror, as well as great artwork. Tom Speelman from Polygon also offered praise for the artwork, while favorably comparing the story to works by American horror author H. P. Lovecraft. Danica Davidson from Otaku USA also praised the artwork, particularly in the facial expressions of the characters. However, Lynzee Loveridge from Anime News Network was more critical. She praised the book's connection to Japanese history, while criticizing the book for what she felt were half-baked plot ideas and minimal scares. Ian Wolf from Anime UK News was more mixed, saying that while Sensor was not as good as other works by Ito, it still stood out from the crowd.

=== Commercial ===
The book ranked fifth on The NPD Group's Monthly BookScan in August 2021. In the following month, the book ranked twelfth on the same list. In ICv2's top graphic novel list, the book ranked first in the units sold category and third in the dollars earned category. In the following month, the book ranked sixth in both categories. The book also ranked sixth on The New York Times Best Seller list for manga and graphic books in September 2021.

At the Angoulême International Comics Festival, the series was nominated for best comic in 2021.
