= No Longer Human (Ito manga) =

Japanese manga series

- First tankōbon volume cover

人間失格 (Ningen Shikkaku)
- Genre: Psychological horror
- Manga
- Written by: Junji Ito
- Published by: Shogakukan
- English publisher: NA: Viz Media
- Magazine: Big Comic Original
- Original run: May 2, 2017 – April 20, 2018
- Volumes: 3
- icon

No Longer Human (Japanese: 人間失格, Hepburn: Ningen Shikkaku) is a Japanese manga series written and illustrated by Junji Ito; it is an adaptation of the novel of the same name by Osamu Dazai. It was serialized in Big Comic Original from May 2017 to April 2018 and published in three volumes.

== Overview ==
No Longer Human is told in the form of notebooks left by one Ōba Yōzō (大庭葉蔵), a troubled man incapable of revealing his true self to others, and who, instead, maintains a facade of hollow jocularity. The work is made up of three chapters, or "memoranda", which chronicle the life of Ōba from his early childhood to his late twenties.

In this version, Yōzō meets Osamu Dazai himself during an asylum recovery, thus giving him permission to tell his story in his next book. The manga includes a retelling of Dazai's suicide from Ōba's perspective.

== Publication ==
Written and illustrated by Junji Ito, the series began serialization in Big Comic Original on May 2, 2017. The series completed its serialization on April 20, 2018. Shogakukan collected the series' individual chapters into three tankōbon volumes.

In February 2019, Viz Media announced they licensed the series for English publication. They released the entire series in one hardcover book.

=== Volumes ===
No.	Original release date	Original ISBN	English release date	English ISBN
1	October 30, 2017	978-4-09-189718-3	December 17, 2019	978-1-9747-0709-6
2	March 30, 2018	978-4-09-189826-5	December 17, 2019	978-1-9747-0709-6
3	July 30, 2018	978-4-09-860056-4	December 17, 2019	978-1-9747-0709-6

== Reception ==
Nick Smith from ICv2 praised the work, stating the story was unpleasant but riveting, with great artwork. Leroy Douresseaux from Comic Book Bin also praised the series as tragic and delicate, while being grotesque and cruel at the same time. Doresseaux also praised the artwork. Brandon Danial from The Fandom Post felt Ito's work was a solid adaptation of the original novel, while also praising the changes Ito made to the story. Nancy Powell from Comics Beat also praised the story, stating that while it is not easy to digest, Ito does a good job telling the story. Adi Tantimedh from Bleeding Cool praised the artwork's portrayal of the main protagonist. Tantimedh also praised the story. Derik Badman from The Comics Journal was more critical of the book, stating that Ito's art is "decent" but can feel stiff and simple in later parts. Badman also felt the adaptation changed too much of the original novel and relied too heavily on misogynistic representations of female characters and over-used horror comic tropes.

In December 2019, the English volume ranked tenth on The NPD Group's bestseller list Monthly BookScan.
