= List of Banana Fish episodes =

Promotional artwork for the series, with Ash (left) and Eiji (right) in the foreground.

Banana Fish is a 2018 anime television series adapted from the 1985 manga of the same name by Akimi Yoshida. The series was produced and animated by MAPPA, while development, promotion, and distribution were overseen by Aniplex. The primary production staff includes Hiroko Utsumi as director, Hiroshi Seko as scriptwriter, Akemi Hayashi as character designer, Shinichi Osawa as sound director. Banana Fish follows the relationship between Ash Lynx, a teenage gang leader in New York City, and Eiji Okumura, a Japanese photographer's assistant. The adaption revises the setting of the manga from the 1980s to the late 2010s, adding modern references such as smartphones and substituting the Vietnam War with the Iraq War.

The Banana Fish anime adaption was greenlit by Shogakukan, which published the original manga, based on a story proposal from Aniplex animation producer Kyōko Uryū. Uryū pitched the series for a 2018 release to coincide with the 40th anniversary of Yoshida's debut as a manga artist; the series would ultimately become part of a broader commemoration project to mark Yoshida's career. Utsumi was appointed as series director at Uryū's recommendation, and her decision to set Banana Fish in the present day led MAPPA CEO Manabu Ootsuka to agree to animate the series. Location scouting for the series was overseen by Utsumi and Seko, who traveled to New York City to conduct interviews and observe locations depicted in the original manga. The series' voice actors were determined by Utsumi, Osawa, and Yoshida, who cast Kenji Nojima as Eiji, and subsequently cast Yuma Uchida as Ash based on his compatibility with Nojima's performance. In 2019, Uchida won the Seiyu Award for Best Actor in a Leading Role at the 13th Seiyu Awards for his performance.

Banana Fish was publicly announced at midnight on October 22, 2017, through Yoshida's website, social media, and screens at Ikebukuro Station in Tokyo, Japan. The trailer for the series was released on February 22, 2018, alongside an announcement of the series' primary voice cast. In Japan, Banana Fish aired on Fuji TV's late-night Noitamina programming block from July 5 to December 20, 2018. It is syndicated by Amazon Video, which simulcast the series internationally during its original broadcast run. The series consists of two cours for a total of 24 episodes, with each episode title referencing a literary work by a writer of the Lost Generation. Aniplex encapsulated the series into four volumes, in DVD and Blu-ray formats.

The series uses four pieces of theme music: two opening and two closing themes. Episodes 1–13 use "found & lost" by Survive Said The Prophet as the opening theme, and "Prayer X" by King Gnu as the closing theme. From episode 14 onwards, the series uses "Freedom" by Blue Encount as the opening theme, and "Red" by Survive Said The Prophet as the closing theme.

== Episode list ==
=== Television series ===
No.	Title	Directed by	Original release date
1	"A Perfect Day for Bananafish"; Transliteration: "Bananafisshu ni Uttetsuke no Hi" (Japanese: バナナ・フィッシュにうってつけの日)	Hiroko Utsumi	July 5, 2018
Ash Lynx, a seventeen-year-old leader of a street gang in New York City, is given a street address and a vial of an unknown substance by a mortally wounded man. The man speaks the words "banana fish" before dying: the same last words spoken by Ash's brother Griffin, an Iraq War veteran who fired on his own squadron under mysterious circumstances, and who is presently in a vegetative state. Meanwhile, Japanese photojournalist Shunichi Ibe and his assistant Eiji Okumura arrive in New York to complete a report on street gangs and are introduced to Ash. In an attack by a rival group, Eiji is kidnapped alongside Skip, a member of Ash's gang.
2	"In Another Country"; Transliteration: "Ikoku nite" (Japanese: 異国にて)	Nobuyoshi Arai	July 12, 2018
Eiji and Skip are held by Arthur, an insurgent member of Ash's gang. Arthur has allied himself with Dino Golzine, a kingpin in the Corsican mafia who formerly groomed Ash as a young child to be a sex slave and heir to his criminal enterprise. Eiji, a former competitive pole vaulter, escapes by vaulting over a wall, though Skip is killed by Marvin, one of Golzine's subordinates. Ash pursues Marvin to his apartment, only to find that he has been shot and killed. The police arrive and arrest Ash for Marvin's murder, on instructions from Golzine.
3	"Across the River and Into the Trees"; Transliteration: "Kawa o Watatte Kodachi no Naka e" (Japanese: 河を渡って木立の中へ)	Kaori Makita	July 19, 2018
In prison, Ash is placed in a cell with Max Lobo, a journalist who was in the same platoon as Griffin. Ash allows a group of prisoners to rape him so that he can be admitted to the medical ward, where he acquires a pill capsule. During a prison visitation, Ash slips a message to Eiji hidden inside the capsule by kissing him. The message instructs him to secure the unknown substance and contact Shorter Wong, a gang leader in Chinatown.
4	"This Side of Paradise"; Transliteration: "Rakuen no Kochiragawa" (Japanese: 楽園のこちら側)	Kōnosuke Uda	July 26, 2018
Eiji is confronted by Arthur, who is in search of the unknown substance on Golzine's behalf. Eiji is rescued by Shorter, though in the subsequent gunfight, Griffin is shot and killed by an unidentified man in Arthur's group.
5	"From Death to Morning"; Transliteration: "Shi yori Asa e" (Japanese: 死より朝へ)	Yasunori Goto	August 2, 2018
Ash is released from prison on bail, and immediately seeks to avenge Griffin. With assistance from Eiji and Shorter, Ash attempts to ambush Golzine at a club used as a front for a child sex ring operated by Golzine. They fail and are rescued by Max and Ibe. The group travels to Ash's family home in Cape Cod to search Griffin's possessions for information on "banana fish."
6	"My Lost City"; Transliteration: "Mai Rosuto Shitī" (Japanese: マイ・ロスト・シティー)	Kiyoshi Matsuda	August 9, 2018
In Cape Cod, the group uses Griffin's files to identify his killer: Abraham Dawson, a member of Griffin's platoon in Iraq who now lives at the address in Los Angeles given to Ash by the dying man. Jim, Ash's estranged father, reveals to the group that as a child Ash was sexually assaulted, and later murdered his rapist; when Ash was sent to live with Jim's younger sister, he ran away from home. That evening, Golzine's men confront Ash, wounding Jim and fatally shooting Jennifer, Jim's girlfriend. Jim stages the scene to appear to be a botched robbery and gives Ash his blessing to take down Golzine. The group travels to the west coast and arrive in Los Angeles.
7	"The Rich Boy"; Transliteration: "Ritchi Bōi" (Japanese: リッチ・ボーイ)	Kaori Makita; Junichirō Hashiguchi	August 16, 2018
After visiting Max's ex-wife Jessica and son Michael, the group arrives at Abraham Dawson's home. They find it occupied by a young man who claims he is the adopted son of Alexis Dawson, the older brother of Abraham, and that he has not seen his father in six months. Ash reviews Dawson's research and learns that the unknown substance is a sample of Banana Fish, a drug with properties similar to LSD. Meanwhile, Shorter is forced by the Lee family triad to spy on Ash and discovers that the young man is actually Yut-Lung Lee, the youngest son of the Lee family. Yut-Lung then threatens to kill Shorter's sister Nadia if he does not kidnap Eiji.
8	"Banal Story"; Transliteration: "Chinpu na Sutōrī" (Japanese: 陳腐なストーリー)	Nobuyoshi Arai	August 23, 2018
Golzine's men attack Jessica and Michael, forcing Ash and Max to leave the group to rescue them. In their absence, Yut-Lung and a reluctant Shorter kidnap Eiji and return to New York to be received by Golzine. Ash and Max return to the Dawson home, where they encounter the real Alexis Dawson. Alexis explains that Banana Fish induces a hypnosis-like state that makes its users susceptible to brainwashing. The drug was created accidentally by the Dawson brothers in university; while Alexis disavowed it, Abraham tested the drug on unwitting soldiers in Iraq, including Griffin.
9	"Save Me the Waltz"; Transliteration: "Warutsu wa Watashi to" (Japanese: ワルツは私と)	Jun Shishido	August 30, 2018
Ash, Max, Ibe, and Abraham are taken back to New York by Golzine's men, and imprisoned in his mansion. To demonstrate the effects of Banana Fish for representatives from the United States government, Shorter is injected with the drug by Abraham, and ordered to kill Eiji. Shorter attacks Eiji in a frenzy, though in a moment of lucidity, he is able to beg Ash to kill him. Ash is given a gun with one bullet by Arthur, which he uses to shoot and kill Shorter.
10	"Babylon Revisited"; Transliteration: "Babiron ni Kaeru" (Japanese: バビロンに帰る)	Yuki Nishihata	September 6, 2018
Through Yut-Lung's intervention, Ash is freed; he rescues the rest of the group, kills Abraham, and cremates Shorter's body. The Chinatown gang, now led by Sing Soo-Ling, join forces with Ash's gang and storm Golzine's mansion, though the alliance is fractured when they learn that Ash has killed Shorter.
11	"The Beautiful and Damned"; Transliteration: "Utsukushiku Norowareshi Mono" (Japanese: 美しく呪われし者)	Kōnosuke Uda	September 13, 2018
Ash returns to Manhattan, where he places Eiji under his protection. Using stock manipulation, Ash collapses the value of the Corsican mafia's front companies and steals $90 million from their accounts, which he uses to purchase a condominium that neighbors a Corsican-owned building. Golzine is forced to leave New York to answer to his superiors in France and leaves Arthur in charge of capturing Ash.
12	"To Have and Have Not"; Transliteration: "Motsu to Motanu to" (Japanese: 持つと持たぬと)	Nobuyoshi Arai	September 20, 2018
In the power vacuum created by Golzine's absence, Ash begins to take out the Corsican-affiliated street gangs. He secures a promise of neutrality from Cain Blood, a gang leader in Harlem, who later agrees to be the observer of a duel between Arthur and Ash. Using Eiji's photography, Ash observes multiple high-profile figures in the United States government visiting the Corsican-owned building. He tells Max that he believes that the United States, backed by mafia funding, intends to use Banana Fish to destabilize the Middle East and create puppet states.
13	"The Snows of Kilimanjaro"; Transliteration: "Kirimanjaro no Yuki" (Japanese: キリマンジャロの雪)	Yui Umemoto	October 4, 2018
Ash faces Arthur in a final duel to the death. Though Ash orders his men to escort Eiji to the airport to be returned to Japan, he evades them and witnesses the duel. Ash ultimately emerges victorious but gravely wounded; in the aftermath of the fight, Ash, Eiji, Sing, and Cain are arrested.
14	"Tender is the Night"; Transliteration: "Yoru wa Yasashi" (Japanese: 夜はやさし)	Kaori Makita	October 11, 2018
Eiji and Sing are released from prison by Yut-Lung, who holds Eiji captive. An assassin sent by the U.S. government members involved in the Banana Fish conspiracy attempts and fails to kill Ash while he is hospitalized, prompting the FBI to send Ash to the National Health Institute, a federal health facility. Shortly thereafter, a news report states that Ash has died.
15	"The Garden of Eden"; Transliteration: "Eden no En" (Japanese: エデンの園)	Naoki Hishikawa	October 18, 2018
Ash's death is revealed to have been faked by the health facility and FBI, both of whom are affiliated with the Corsican mafia. The facility is used to test Banana Fish on human subjects; Ash's extraordinary intellect has made him an ideal candidate to refine the effects of the drug on a live brain. When Golzine attempts to halt in the experiment, he is removed from the Banana Fish project. Meanwhile, Eiji escapes from Yut-Lung and is taken in by Sing.
16	"Lo, The Poor Peacock"; Transliteration: "Kanashimi no Kujaku" (Japanese: 哀しみの孔雀)	Daisuke Tokudo	October 25, 2018
Ash escapes the facility with Alexis Dawson, now in a vegetative state after being used as a test subject for Banana Fish. He leaves Dawson in the care of Max and Ibe and returns to New York to search for Eiji.
17	"The Killers"; Transliteration: "Koroshiya" (Japanese: 殺し屋)	Yuki Nishihata	November 1, 2018
Yut-Lung forms an alliance with Golzine, who eliminates the other members of the Lee family syndicate. Golzine hires Blanca, a retired assassin and Ash's former mentor, to kill the government co-conspirators in the Banana Fish project.
18	"Islands in the Stream"; Transliteration: "Kairyū no Naka no Shimajima" (Japanese: 海流のなかの島々)	Nobuyoshi Arai	November 8, 2018
Yut-Lung, Golzine, and Blanca issue an ultimatum to Ash: return to Golzine's fold with Dawson and the research he has collected on Banana Fish, or Eiji will be killed. Ash accepts that he cannot defeat Blanca, and wishing to protect Eiji, he agrees to their terms.
19	"Ice Palace"; Transliteration: "Kōri no Kyūden" (Japanese: 氷の宮殿)	Kaori Makita	November 15, 2018
Ash becomes an advisor to Golzine, who makes plans to legally adopt Ash as his son. Yut-Lung attempts to contract Blanca to kill Eiji; though Blanca refuses, Yut-Lung uses his knowledge of Blanca's history as a disgraced Spetsnaz officer to blackmail him into becoming his bodyguard. Eiji, Sing, and Cain devise a plan to rescue Ash.
20	"The Unvanquished"; Transliteration: "Seifuku Sarezaru Hitobito" (Japanese: 征服されざる人々)	Yusuke Kubo	November 22, 2018
Eiji, Sing, and Cain rescue Ash, though multiple members of their gangs are captured and held hostage in the ensuing escape. Ash retreats to the American Museum of Natural History, where he kidnaps Yut-Lung and exchanges him for the hostages.
21	"The Undefeated"; Transliteration: "Yaburezaru Mono" (Japanese: 敗れざる者)	Shinpei Ezaki	November 29, 2018
Golzine and Yut-Lung hire the militia of Eduardo Foxx, a mercenary and former member of the French Foreign Legion, to capture Ash. Max begins to investigate Golzine's child sex ring; his efforts attract the attention of the Corsican mafia, prompting Jessica to travel to New York after placing Michael in hiding. Foxx overwhelms Ash's, Sing's, and Cain's gangs in an assault on their hideout and forces Ash's surrender.
22	"As I Lay Dying"; Transliteration: "Shi no Toko ni Yokotawarite" (Japanese: 死の床に横たわりて)	Nobuyoshi Arai	December 6, 2018
Max and the other captives are sent to the National Health Institute. Lao Yen-Thai, Sing's half-brother who has never forgiven Ash for killing Shorter, is ordered by Yut-Lung to kill Eiji, though he refuses to do so. Yut-Lung issues the same order to two of his men, who shoot Eiji in the stomach.
23	"For Whom the Bell Tolls"; Transliteration: "Taga Tame ni Kane wa Naru" (Japanese: 誰がために鐘は鳴る)	Yui Umemoto	December 13, 2018
Eiji, now hospitalized, is kept away from Ash in order to not be implicated as his accomplice. The collected gangs (aided by Blanca, who has ended his tenure with Yut-Lung) organize their assault on the National Health Institute; Lao, who refuses to accept orders from Ash, is exiled from the Chinatown gang. Jessica leaks Max's investigation to the media, catching the Corsican mafia off-guard and creating an opening for Ash to kidnap Golzine. Ash attempts to trade Golzine for the hostages, but Foxx shoots Golzine.
24	"The Catcher in the Rye"; Transliteration: "Rai Mugibatake de Tsukamaete" (Japanese: ライ麦畑でつかまえて)	Hiroko Utsumi; Daisuke Tokudo	December 20, 2018
In a final battle, the hostages are rescued, Foxx and Golzine are killed, and all evidence of the Banana Fish project is destroyed. In the aftermath, Max's investigation prompts a scandal in Washington, while Sing convinces Yut-Lung to end his pursuit of Eiji and Ash. Eiji and Ibe return to Japan, though Ash recognizes the danger he exposes Eiji to and does not attempt to contact him. Before he departs, Eiji entrusts a letter for Ash to Sing, wherein he tells Ash that "my soul is always with you." While distracted by the letter, Ash is stabbed by Lao; he shoots and kills Lao in return. Ash staggers into the New York Public Library Main Branch where he dies, smiling and clutching Eiji's letter.

=== Audio drama ===
The audio drama episodes are character voices, music, and sound effects used to tell a story. In Japan, audio dramas were included with certain volumes of the DVD and Blu-ray releases, and adapt scenes from the original manga not included in the anime adaptation. The first collected volume included "Angel Eyes", while the fourth volume included the five-part audio drama "Five Stories".

Title	Packaged in Japan with
"Angel Eyes"	Volume 1
Based on the side story of the same name in the original manga. As Shorter travels with the group to Los Angeles (as depicted in episode 6 of the anime series), he writes a postcard to his sister Nadia and tells her the story of how he met Ash when they were in juvenile prison.
"Fathers and Sons" Transliteration: "Chichi to Ko" (Japanese: 父と子)	Volume 4
Ash pretends to be Max's son in order to evade detection from the police.
"Out of Season" Transliteration: "Kisetsu Hazure" (Japanese: 季節はずれ)	Volume 4
Bones and Kong recall celebrating Halloween with Ash, Eiji, and Alex.
"Other Voices, Other Rooms" Transliteration: "Tōi Koe, Tōi Heya" (Japanese: 遠い声 遠い部屋)	Volume 4
Ibe talks to Ash about Eiji's life in Japan, and attempts to teach him to speak Japanese.
"God Rest You Merry, Gentlemen" Transliteration: "Kamiyo, Otoko-tachi o Tanoshiku Ikowa Shime Tamae" (Japanese: 神よ、男たちを楽しく憩わしめたまえ)	Volume 4
Blanca discusses his time in the Caribbean with Yut-Lung, and mediates a dispute between Yut-Lung and Sing.
"All the Sad Young Men" Transliteration: "Subete Kanashiki Wakamono-tachi" (Japanese: すべて悲しき若者たち)	Volume 4
Eiji and Ash eat Japanese food together.

== Media release ==
=== Japanese release ===
Aniplex released Banana Fish across four volumes, in DVD and Blu-ray media formats.

Aniplex (Japan, Region 2)
Volume	Episodes	Release date	Ref.
Volume 1	1–6	October 24, 2018	
Volume 2	7–12	February 27, 2019	
Volume 3	13–18	April 3, 2019	
Volume 4	19–24	May 29, 2019	
