= California Story =

Japanese manga series by Akimi Yoshida

- Cover of the final volume of the series

カリフォルニア物語 (California Monogatari)
- Genre: Drama, romance
- Manga
- Written by: Akimi Yoshida
- Published by: Shogakukan
- Imprint: Flower Comics
- Magazine: Bessatsu Shōjo Comic
- Original run: February 1978 – December 1981
- Volumes: 8
- Stage show
- California Story (2008; revived in 2018)

California Story (Japanese: カリフォルニア物語, Hepburn: California Monogatari) is a Japanese manga series written and illustrated by Akimi Yoshida, serialized in Bessatsu Shōjo Comic from 1978 to 1981.

== Synopsis ==
In 1975, wealthy delinquent Heath Swanson drops out of high school and runs away from his home in San Diego, California, to live in New York City. While traveling across the United States, he stays in rural Texas, where he meets a group of individuals who decide to join Heath on his journey to New York City.

== Characters ==
Heath Swanson (ヒース・スワンソン)
The protagonist of the series. The youngest child of a wealthy and broken California family, his absentee father and estranged mother led him to become a delinquent and drug addict. His decision to become a runaway and relocate to New York City acts as a catalyst for the events of the series.
Eve Luciano (イーヴ・ルチアーノ)
A Puerto Rican teenager who Heath meets in Texas. He has lived a hard life in contrast to Heath's wealthy upbringing – he is impoverished, illiterate, and previously worked as a prostitute – but possesses a kind and cheerful disposition.
Indian (インディアン)
A painter and interior designer who meets Heath during his travels. A former drug addict, he assists Heath in his rehabilitation.
Butch (ブッチ)
A teenage con artist who Heath meets and befriends in Texas while staying at a hotel owned by Butch's mother.
Sueana Lambert (スウェナ・ランバート)
Butch's sister, who falls in love with Heath after meeting him in Texas.

== Media ==
=== Manga ===
Yoshida, who was twenty years old when California Story was initially published, has said that she drew inspiration for the series from American New Wave cinema (particularly Midnight Cowboy) and the Japanese television drama Wounded Angel (Kizu Darake no Tenshi). The series was serialized in the manga magazine Bessatsu Shōjo Comic from February 1978 until December 1981, and was collected by Shogakukan as eight tankōbon volumes published from November 1979 to April 1982 (listed below). The series has been reprinted as four hardcover bunkobon volumes published from December 1988 to March 1989, and as a four-volume softcover bunkobon set published in November 1994.

No.	Release date	ISBN
1	November 20, 1979	978-4091305114
2	January 20, 1980	978-4091305121
3	March 20, 1980	978-4091305138
4	May 20, 1980	978-4091305145
5	January 20, 1981	978-4091305152
6	October 20, 1981	978-4091305169
7	January 20, 1982	978-4091305176
8	April 20, 1982	978-4091305183

=== Stage play ===
In 2008, the theater company Studio Life produced a theatrical adaptation of California Story written and directed by Jun Kurata, which was staged at the Galaxy Theater in Tokyo from February 27 to March 9 of that year. The play, which featured a rotating all-male cast, starred Tsuyoshi Hayashi and Dai Iwasaki as Heath, and Shingo Nakagawa and Shinya Matsumoto as Eve. A revival of the play was staged at The Pocket in Tokyo from July 20 to August 5, 2018, with Kurata returning as director.

=== Other media ===
California Tuning (カリフォルニア・チューニング), a California Story art book, was published by Sanrio in 1982.

== Reception and legacy ==
The series has been praised by critics for its unvarnished portrayal of the United States in the 1970s, and has been noted for its frank depiction of racism, poverty, and drug use. The series is regarded as a precursor to Yoshida's later manga series Banana Fish, with both works sharing a New York City setting and a thematic focus on youth romance, urban drama, and homoeroticism.
