= River's Edge (2018 film) =

2018 film

- Film poster
- Directed by: Isao Yukisada
- Written by: Misaki Setoyama
- Produced by: Shunsuke Koga; Shinji Ogawa; Tsuyoshi Sugiyama; Takahiro Yoshizawa
- Starring: Fumi Nikaidō; Ryo Yoshizawa
- Cinematography: Kenji Maki
- Edited by: Tsuyoshi Imai
- Music by: Hiroko Sebu
- Distributed by: Kino Films
- Release dates: 15 February 2018 (Berlin); 16 February 2018 (Japan)
- Running time: 118 minutes
- Country: Japan
- Language: Japanese

River's Edge (Japanese: リバーズ・エッジ) is a 2018 Japanese film directed by Isao Yukisada. It is based on the manga of the same title by Kyoko Okazaki. It was screened in the Panorama section at the 68th Berlin International Film Festival.

== Cast ==
- Fumi Nikaidō as Haruna Wakakusa
- Ryo Yoshizawa as Ichiro Yamada
- Shuhei Uesugi as Kannonzaki
- Sumire Chara as Kozue Yoshikawa
- Shiori Doi as Rumi
- Aoi Morikawa as Kannna Tajima
