= Kisshō Tennyo =

Japanese media franchise

- Cover of the first tankōbon volume

吉祥天女
- Genre: Drama, mystery
- Manga
- Written by: Akimi Yoshida
- Published by: Shogakukan
- Magazine: Bessatsu Shōjo Comic
- Original run: February 1983 – June 1984
- Volumes: 4
- Television drama
- Directed by: Naomi Tamura; Toshiaki Kondō
- Written by: Haruko Fukushima
- Original network: TV Asahi
- Original run: April 15, 2006 – June 24, 2006
- Episodes: 10
- Live-action film
- Directed by: Ataru Oikawa
- Written by: Ataru Oikawa
- Music by: Hiroyuki Kozu
- Studio: Blue Planet
- Released: June 30, 2007
- Runtime: 116 minutes

Kisshō Tennyo (Japanese: 吉祥天女) is a Japanese shōjo manga series written and illustrated by Akimi Yoshida. It was serialized by Shogakukan in Bessatsu Shōjo Comic between February 1983 and June 1984 and collected in four bound volumes. Kisshō Tennyo received the 1983 Shogakukan Manga Award for shōjo manga.

== Characters ==
The main character, Sayoko Kanō, is implied to be a descendant (or possibly avatar) of the goddess Kisshō Tennyo.

== Media ==
=== Manga ===
The individual chapters of the manga were collected in four tankōbon volumes released between September 1983 and September 1984. The series was re-released by Shogakukan in a two-volume bunkoban edition in February 1995.

=== List of volumes ===
No.	Release date	ISBN
1	September 26, 1983	4-09-131301-9
2	February 25, 1984	4-09-131302-7
3	June 26, 1984	4-09-131303-5
4	September 26, 1984	4-09-131304-3

=== Live-action ===
From April 15, 2006, to June 24, 2006, TV Asahi aired a live-action television adaptation of Kisshō Tennyo. There were 10 episodes in total. It was directed by Naomi Tamura and Toshiaki Kondō and starred Sayuri Iwata in the lead role of Sayoko Kanō.

On June 30, 2007, Blue Planet also released a live-action film adaptation of the series, directed by Ataru Oikawa and starring Anne Suzuki in the lead role. On December 21, 2007, Happinet Pictures released the film on DVD.

== Reception ==
Manga artist Kyoko Okazaki references a scene of Kisshō Tennyo in her 1989 manga Pink.

== Literatur ==
- Spies, Alwyn (2003). Studying Shojo Manga. Global Education, Narratives of the Self and Pathologization of the Feminine. University of British Columbia.
