= Umimachi Diary =

Japanese manga series

- Cover of the first tankōbon volume

海街diary
- Manga
- Written by: Akimi Yoshida
- Published by: Shogakukan
- Magazine: Monthly Flowers
- Original run: June 28, 2006 – June 28, 2018
- Volumes: 9
- Manga

Utagawa Hyakkei
- Written by: Akimi Yoshida
- Published by: Shogakukan
- Magazine: Monthly Flowers
- Original run: July 26, 2019 – present
- Live-action film
- Our Little Sister (2015)

Umimachi Diary (Japanese: 海街diary; lit. "Seaside Town Diary") is a Japanese manga series written and illustrated by Akimi Yoshida. It was serialized in Shogakukan's josei manga magazine Monthly Flowers from the August 2006 issue to the August 2018 issue (both sold on June 28 of their respective years).

A film adaptation titled Our Little Sister, directed by Hirokazu Kore-eda and starring Suzu Hirose, was first announced in the June 2014 issue of Monthly Flowers. The film was released on June 13, 2015.

A spin-off manga series titled Utagawa Hyakkei has been serialized in Monthly Flowers since July 26, 2019.

== Characters ==
Sachi Kōda (香田 幸, Kōda Sachi)
Portrayed by: Haruka Ayase
The eldest sister of the Kōda family. She is 29 years old. She works as a nurse in a hospital. Very serious and reliable.
Yoshino Kōda (香田 佳乃, Kōda Yoshino)
Portrayed by: Masami Nagasawa
Second sister of the Kōda family. She is 22 years old. She works as an office lady in a bank. She loves drinking alcohol and is pretty embarrassing when she gets drunk. She often dates young, handsome boys. Once, she dated Tomoaki Fujii, one of the protagonists of Lovers' Kiss (an older manga series by Akimi Yoshida, also set in Kamakura).
Chika Kōda (香田 千佳, Kōda Chika)
Portrayed by: Kaho
The younger sister of Kōda family. She is 19 years old. She works in a sports equipment shop.
Suzu Asano (浅野 すず, Asano Suzu)
Portrayed by: Suzu Hirose
She shares the same father as the Kōda sisters. She is 13 years old and still in junior high school. She is very reliable and serious, which caught Sachi's attention. She lived in Sendai with her father and mother, but after her mother's death, her father remarried a woman named Yōko in Yamagata. She met her half-sisters at her father's funeral, and moved to Kamakura to live with them. She is very good at soccer.

== Volumes ==
No.	Release date	ISBN
1	April 26, 2007	978-4-09-167025-0
2	October 10, 2008	978-4-09-167037-3
3	February 10, 2010	978-4-09-167040-3
4	August 10, 2011	978-4-09-167048-9
5	December 10, 2012	978-4-09-167053-3
6	July 10, 2014	978-4-09-167058-8
7	January 8, 2016	978-4-09-167073-1
8	April 10, 2017	978-4-09-167078-6
9	December 10, 2018	978-4-09-167088-5

== Reception ==
Umimachi Diary won the Excellence Prize for manga at the 2007 Japan Media Arts Festival. It was also nominated for the 1st Manga Taishō (Cartoon Grand Prize), where it came in 3rd place, and won the 6th Manga Taishō in 2013. It was nominated for the 12th Tezuka Osamu Cultural Prize in 2008, where it came in 2nd place; and for the 13th Tezuka Osamu Cultural Prize in 2009. In 2016, the manga won the 61st Shogakukan Manga Award in the General category, sharing it with Sunny. In 2019, along with Demon Slayer: Kimetsu no Yaiba, Umimachi Diary ranked #10 on the 19th "Book of the Year" list by Da Vinci magazine.
