= SK8 the Infinity =

Japanese anime television series

- Key visual

SK∞ エスケーエイト (Esu Kē Eito)
- Genre: Adventure; Sports (skateboarding)
- Created by: Bones; Hiroko Utsumi
- Anime television series
- Directed by: Hiroko Utsumi
- Produced by: Masanori Miyake (chief); Kyōko Uryū; Subaru Tanaka; Akihiro Sotokawa
- Written by: Ichirō Ōkouchi
- Music by: Ryō Takahashi
- Studio: Bones
- Licensed by: Aniplex of America: SEA: Muse Communication
- Original network: ANN (ABC, TV Asahi)
- English network: SEA: Animax Asia
- Original run: January 10, 2021 – present
- Episodes: 12
- Manga

SK8 Chill Out!
- Written by: Toriyasu
- Published by: Kadokawa Shoten
- Magazine: Young Ace Up
- Original run: January 11, 2021 – September 20, 2021
- Manga
- Written by: Kazuto Kōjima
- Published by: BookLive!
- Imprint: Nino
- Original run: March 5, 2021 – present
- Original video animation

SK8 the Infinity Extra Part
- Directed by: Hiroko Utsumi
- Written by: Ichirō Ōkouchi
- Studio: Bones Film
- Released: March 19, 2025
- Episodes: 4
- icon

SK8 the Infinity (Japanese: SK∞ エスケーエイト, Hepburn: Esu Kē Eito; stylized as SK∞ the Infinity) is a Japanese original anime television series produced and animated by Bones. It premiered on January 11, 2021, on ANN's Animazing!!! programming block. A comedy manga spin-off was serialized on the Young Ace Up manga website from January to September 2021. A manga adaptation of the television series began serialization on the BookLive! e-book store in March 2021. Few years after the first season, original video animation (OVA) was released in Japan in March 2025, with a second season being produced.

== Plot ==
In Okinawa, a group of hardcore skaters participate in a secret, no-holds-barred competition after midnight known as "S", racing each other on skateboards down a winding road carved out of an abandoned mine and occasionally forming rivalries, also known as "beefs", with each other. Reki, a high school sophomore and hardcore skater, takes new transfer student Langa to S one night, and ends up pulling him into the world of skateboarding.

== Characters ==
Reki Kyan (喜屋武 暦, Kyan Reki)
Voiced by: Tasuku Hatanaka (Japanese); Matt Shipman (English)
A cheerful and energetic high school sophomore passionate about skateboarding and dedicated to the underground "S" races. Reki works part-time as a mechanic at a local skate shop, where he also crafts custom skateboard decks. Reki quickly befriends Langa and introduces him to skateboarding and the "S" races.
Langa Hasegawa (馳河 ランガ, Hasegawa Ranga) / Snow
Voiced by: Chiaki Kobayashi (Japanese); Howard Wang (English)
A half-Japanese transfer student from Canada, Langa moves to Okinawa with his mother and joins Reki's class. With a background in snowboarding, he adapts his skills to skateboarding upon joining his first "S" race. He is introverted and dreamy but can be extremely stubborn.
Miya Chinen (知念 実也, Chinen Miya)
Voiced by: Takuma Nagatsuka (Japanese); Ry McKeand (English)
A cheeky and skilled first-year junior high student known for performing complex tricks with ease. Miya aspires to represent Japan in the Olympics and loves cats and video games.
Hiromi Higa (比嘉 広海, Higa Hiromi) / Shadow (シャドウ, Shadō)
Voiced by: Kenta Miyake (Japanese); Chris Guerrero (English)
An "S" racer characterized by his cape, heavy metal makeup, and self-proclaimed title as a "dynamite flower". Known for carrying fireworks and his shamelessness to use ruthless tactics to win, Shadow contrasts with his shy and kind personality as a local florist by day.
Kaoru Sakurayashiki (桜屋敷 薫, Sakurayashiki Kaoru) / Cherry Blossom
Voiced by: Hikaru Midorikawa (Japanese); Daman Mills (English)
A high-tech "S" racer with pink hair, who works as a renowned AI calligrapher by day. Assisted by his AI partner Carla, Cherry approaches skating with a strategic and analytical perspective. He has a longstanding rivalry and friendship with Joe, and often bickers with him.
Kojiro Nanjo (南城 虎次郎, Nanjō Kojirō) / Joe (ジョー, Jō)
Voiced by: Yasunori Matsumoto (Japanese); Jonah Scott (English)
An "S" racer and owner of an Italian restaurant. Known for his cheerful and flirtatious personality, Joe's dynamic skating style reflects his character. He is Cherry's both childhood friend and rival.
Ainosuke Shindo (神道 愛之介, Shindō Ainosuke) / Adam (愛抱夢, Adamu)
Voiced by: Takehito Koyasu (Japanese); David Wald (season 1), Reagan Murdock (Extra Part) (English)
The mysterious founder of "S" and a legendary skater. Beneath his glamorous mask, Adam leads a double life as a popular young politician.
Tadashi Kikuchi (菊池 忠, Kikuchi Tadashi) / Snake (スネーク, Sunēku)
Voiced by: Kensho Ono (Japanese); Brandon Johnson (English)
Adam's secretary and skateboarding mentor. In "S", he oversees the management of the baseball-capped staff behind the scenes.
Shokichi Oka (岡 正吉, Oka Shōkichi)
Voiced by: Kenta Okuma (Japanese); Zeno Robinson (English)
Manager of the Dope Sketch skateboard shop, in charge of board maintenance.
Sketchy (スケッチー, Suketchī)
Voiced by: Arisa Sekine
The fennec fox mascot of Dope Sketch, who listens only to Oka.
Carla (カーラ, Kāra)
Voiced by: Yukiko Motoyoshi (Japanese); Kimmie Britt (English)
Cherry's advanced AI assistant.
Nanako Hasegawa (馳河 菜々子, Hasegawa Nanako)
Voiced by: Mie Sonozaki (Japanese); Colleen Clickenbeard (English)
Langa's mother.

== Production ==
In an interview with Wakanim, Studio No Border founder Thomas Romain said that after meeting with Bones about Carole and Tuesday, him and the other crew at his studio ran into Suzuki, a producer on the show. She asked the studio if they were interested in designing skateboards for an original show, of which they ended up agreeing to do. The skateboards were specifically designed so that they could work if built in real life. Juliette Mercier, who had previous experience designing skateboards, ended up doing most of the designs. After some small changes, they were approved. When it came to the decals, they were purposely stylized to be unique to each character in order to symbolize their personalities. Ayumi Kakei did the designs for Reki and Langa's skateboards, with a "pop" style. French comic book artist Loic Locatelli did the decals for Shadow and Joe, while Thomas Romain did Adam's himself. In total, five different artists from the studio worked on the series, which was a first for them.

The skaterboarders' moves were also inspired by real people, with one example being Miya's style, which has striking similarities to Rodney Mullen's style.

Bones also ran a weekly blog for the series, where they shared various concepts sketches by Hiroko Utsumi alongside each episode's release.

== Media ==
=== Anime ===
On September 13, 2020, it was reported that Hiroko Utsumi and Bones were working on an anime television series project. Further details were not revealed until the following week. On September 20, 2020, the series was officially announced. Utsumi directed the series, while Ichirō Ōkouchi oversaw the series' scripts, Michinori Chiba designed the characters and served as chief animation director, and Ryō Takahashi composed the series' music. The series aired from January 10 to April 4, 2021, on ABC and TV Asahi's Animazing!!! programming block. The opening theme song is "Paradise" performed by Rude-α, while the ending theme song is "Infinity" (インフィニティ, Infiniti) performed by Yuuri. The series ran for 12 episodes.

On July 4, 2021, a new anime project for the series was announced. On August 14, 2022, the project was revealed to be a second season and an original video animation (OVA). The main staff from the previous season are reprising their roles. The OVA, titled SK8 the Infinity Extra Part, consists of four episodes and was released in Japan on March 19, 2025, following an early theatrical screening on January 24 of the same year for a limited time.

Aniplex of America licensed the series outside of Asia and streamed it on Funimation, AnimeLab, and Wakanim in their territories. In Southeast Asia, the series is licensed by Muse Communication, who streamed it on Bilibili. Muse later licensed the anime to Animax Asia for TV airings. Funimation produced a SimulDub for the series.

==== Episodes ====
No.	Title (Note: All English titles are taken from Funimation.)	Directed by	Storyboarded by	Original release date
1	"Snowfall on a Hot Night"; Transliteration: "Atsui Yoru ni Yuki ga Furu" (Japanese: 熱い夜に雪が降る)	Hiroko Utsumi	Hiroko Utsumi	January 10, 2021
Reki Kyan partakes in "S", an underground skateboarding race, but loses to a competitor named Shadow, injures his left arm in the process, and his skateboard is set on fire. The next day, a new transfer student from Canada named Langa Hasegawa joins Reki's class. After encountering each other after school, Langa applies for a job at Dope Sketch, the skateboard shop where Reki works. The two deliver a custom skateboard to a client participating in an upcoming S race. Reki later discovers he had brought the wrong skateboard, and, as punishment, is ordered to race in the client's place against Shadow. Langa volunteers, and to everyone's surprise, wins the race by adapting his snowboarding skills to skateboarding.
2	"Awesome for the First Time!"; Transliteration: "Hajimete no Saikō!" (Japanese: はじめてのサイコー！)	Takahiro Hasui	Hiroko Utsumi	January 17, 2021
As Langa's "beef" (challenge race) against Shadow goes viral, Reki begins teaching him the fundamentals of skateboarding. The two learn each other's motivations for skateboarding as Langa practices, and Reki designs a custom skateboard equipped with foot straps to suit Langa's snowboarding techniques. After two weeks of practice, Langa successfully lands his first ollie. Meanwhile, Miya, having learned about Langa's skills, challenges him to a beef.
3	"Undesired Hero"; Transliteration: "Nozomanai Yūsha" (Japanese: 望まない勇者)	Noriyuki Nomata	Takuya Igarashi	January 24, 2021
Langa accepts Miya's challenge to race at S. While Reki helps Langa practice, he replaces his skateboard's foot straps with toe clips and the pivots with swivels. During the race, Miya wagers Reki as the reward, but Langa wins by using the swivel to grind down a broken stair rail. Recognizing that Miya is lonely, especially after he was ostracized by his peers, Reki offers to be his friend. Adam, however, suddenly appears, taking a keen interest in Langa while belittling Miya. Reki demands Adam to apologize to Miya and challenges him to a beef.
4	"Adam, the Matador of Love"; Transliteration: "Ai no Matadōru, Adamu" (Japanese: 愛のマタドール、愛抱夢)	Takahiro Hasui	Takahiro Hasui	January 31, 2021
Adam accepts Reki's challenge on the condition that Langa will race him if he wins. Reki and Langa learn from Joe that Adam is the founder of S. Despite warnings from Miya, Joe, and Langa to withdraw, Reki insists on going through with the race. During the race, Adam gives Reki a head start but pulls him into a dangerous "dance". As Reki loses hope, Langa inspires him to attempt a railslide, a trick he learned from Miya, on one of the course's turns. However, Adam overtakes him and performs his signature move, the "love hug", in which he skates toward his opponent. Surprised, Reki panics, falls from his skateboard, and loses the race.
5	"Passionate Dancing Night!"; Transliteration: "Jōnetsu no Danshingu Naito!" (Japanese: 情熱のダンシングNight！)	Tetsuya Miyanishi	Takuya Igarashi	February 7, 2021
While Langa prepares for his beef against Adam, Cherry and Joe explain Adam's love hug. Reki, whose arm is broken, concludes that Adam is too dangerous and pleads with Langa not to compete. Langa, however, remains determined to race. During the beef, Langa outsmarts Adam by pulling him closer during their "dance" to intensify their spin and performs an aerial to dodge his love hug. Impressed, Adam entrances Langa to follow his lead. However, the race is cut short when police raid the area under orders from Kiriko Kamata. Reki helps Langa escape and later makes him promise not to race Adam again.
6	"Steamy Mystery Skating?!"; Transliteration: "Yukemuri Misuterī Sukēto?!" (Japanese: 湯けむりミステリースケート？！)	Takashi Yasui	Takuya Igarashi	February 14, 2021
Reki, Langa, Miya, Shadow, Cherry, and Joe travel to Miyako-jima to visit the hot springs. During the trip, Reki becomes discouraged after seeing Langa's fast progress in skateboarding and confides his insecurities to Joe. That night, the six race to the hot springs despite local warnings about hauntings. Langa turns back to help a frightened Reki, and the two discover that Shadow and Miya have been attacked by spirits. The spirits then attack Reki and Langa, as well as Cherry and Joe, who had won the race. The following morning, the six wonder who attacked them, unaware that the Paantu festival had taken place the night before. Meanwhile, Adam announces a tournament for S.
7	"We Don't Balance Out"; Transliteration: "Tsuriawanē nda yo" (Japanese: つりあわねーんだよ)	Takanori Yano	Akemi Hayashi	February 21, 2021
Reki begins to feel increasingly inferior to Langa and avoids him. Meanwhile, Adam conspires with politician Takano while announcing the tournament that evening. However, Kiriko uncovers the bribe and arrests Takano; Adam orders his secretary, Tadashi, to take the fall on his behalf. While practicing, Reki becomes further discouraged after failing to match Langa's jumping height. That night, when Langa tells Reki about the tournament and his desire to race Adam, Reki reacts angrily and ends their friendship.
8	"The Fated Tournament!"; Transliteration: "Shukumei no Tōnamento!" (Japanese: 宿命のトーナメント！)	Takahiro Hasui	Takahiro Hasui	February 28, 2021
Langa, Shadow, Miya, Cherry, and Joe qualify for the tournament, while Tadashi enters under the alias "Snake" against Adam's wishes, stipulating that Adam must quit skateboarding if Tadashi wins. Meanwhile, Reki remains distant toward Langa, and both receive guidance from their families on their struggles. Following Joe's advice, Reki goes undercover at S to observe the tournament. Shadow wins his beef, and Langa is selected to compete against Joe in the next beef.
9	"We Were Special Back Then"; Transliteration: "Ano Toki, Oretachi wa Tokubetsu Datta" (Japanese: あの時、俺たちは特別だった)	Takayuki Yamamoto	Takayuki Yamamoto	March 7, 2021
During their beef, Joe takes an early lead over Langa. Langa nearly loses focus, but ultimately wins with Reki's encouragement, despite breaking his skateboard in the process. After the race, Reki realizes he prefers skating alongside his friends rather than merely supporting them and leaves S before Langa can find him. In the next beef, Cherry faces Adam, and despite initially gaining an advantage, Adam strikes Cherry's face with his skateboard near the race's end, resulting in Adam's victory.
9.5	"Crazy Rock JAM" (Japanese: クレイジーロックJAM)	Nobutaka Yoda	Nobutaka Yoda	March 14, 2021
Miya and Shadow recap the events of the previous nine episodes using Carla as a projector.
10	"DAP Not Needing Words"; Transliteration: "Kotoba no Iranai DAP" (Japanese: 言葉のいらないDAP)	Masatoyo Takada, Takayuki Yamamoto	Akemi Hayashi	March 21, 2021
Tadashi wins his race against Miya. Reki takes the next day off from work and school, but after a confrontation with his former skating group leaves him beaten, Oka informs him that Shadow has been attacked and hospitalized. Reki visits the hospital but leaves upon seeing Langa there, only to be hit by Tadashi's car as he exits. The confrontation prompts Reki to remember the joy of skating, leading him to visit the skate park and apologize to Langa. The two reconcile, and Adam assigns Reki to take Shadow's place in the tournament.
11	"King vs Nobody"; Transliteration: "Kingu VS Zako" (Japanese: キング VS ザコ)	Takahiro Hasui, Daisuke Chiba, Takanori Yano	Takahiro Hasui	March 28, 2021
Reki is determined to race against Adam despite Tadashi's attempts to dissuade him. During the beef, Adam strikes Reki. Approaching a turn, Reki is inspired by Langa to perform an aerial down a cliff. When it begins to rain, Reki takes advantage of the rain-resistant wheels on his skateboard while Adam loses his footing. Near the finish, Reki's wheel detaches, causing him to lose, but his renewed love for skating earns the crowd's cheers. Recognizing that Langa might help Adam also rediscover his love for skating, Tadashi forfeits his match to allow Adam and Langa to compete.
12	"Our Infinity!"; Transliteration: "Oretachi no Mugendai!" (Japanese: 俺たちの無限大！)	Hiroko Utsumi, Yoshiyuki Asai, Takayuki Yamamoto, Masatoyo Takada	Takuya Igarashi	April 4, 2021
Adam and Langa race on S's original but more hazardous track. Under Adam's intense pressure, Langa enters a mental state of extreme focus to the point of losing awareness of his surroundings. After a fall, he notices the word "fun" written on his skateboard by Reki, which helps him reconnect with the joy of skating. Through this, Langa inspires Adam to rediscover his own enjoyment for the sport, leading to Langa's victory. The group celebrates Langa's win, and Adam is granted a pardon after providing the police with information about his accomplice. As part of an earlier promise, Reki and Langa compete in a race at S.
OVA	"The Rain and a Cat, Soda Ice Cream from the Convenience Store"; Transliteration: "Ame to Neko, Conbini Aisu Sōda Aji" (Japanese: 雨と猫 コンビニアイス ソーダ味)	Tomoyo Kamoi	Tomoyo Kamoi	March 19, 2025
OVA	"Becoming Really Serious About Things"; Transliteration: "Maji de Maji ni Nareru Koto" (Japanese: 本気(マジ)でマジになれること)	Tomoyo Kamoi	Tomoyo Kamoi	March 19, 2025
OVA	"Morning Routine"	Tomoyo Kamoi	Tomoyo Kamoi	March 19, 2025
OVA	"Hiromi, Do Your Best!"; Transliteration: "Ganbare Hiromi-chan!" (Japanese: がんばれ広海ちゃん！)	Tomoyo Kamoi	Tomoyo Kamoi	March 19, 2025

=== Manga ===
A comedy manga spin-off by Toriyasu, titled SK8 Chill Out!, was serialized on Kadokawa Shoten's Young Ace Up manga website from January 11 to September 20, 2021. A manga adaptation of the television series by Kazuto Kōjima released on the BookLive! e-book store under their Nino imprint starting on March 5, 2021.

=== Stage plays ===
Two stage play adaptations were announced on July 4, 2021. SK8 Part 1 ran from December 2–12, 2021. SK8 Part 2 was scheduled to take place from January 15–24, 2022, but the shows were canceled after a staff member tested positive for COVID-19.
