= Kyoko Okazaki =

Japanese manga artist (born 1963)

- Born: December 13, 1963 (age 62) Setagaya, Tokyo, Japan
- Occupation: Manga artist, Illustrator
- Education: Atomi University
- Years active: 1983–1996
- Notable works: Pink; Helter Skelter; River's Edge; Happy House
- Notable awards: Japan Media Arts Festival; Tezuka Osamu Cultural Prize

Kyoko Okazaki (Japanese: 岡崎 京子, Hepburn: Okazaki Kyōko; born December 13, 1963) is a Japanese manga artist. During her career from the mid-1980s until the mid-1990s, she published her work in seinen manga magazines, josei manga magazines as well as fashion magazines. She produced around 20 volumes of manga, the most famous being Pink (1989), River's Edge (1993–1994) and Helter Skelter (1995). Her work was discussed in academic literature for breaking the norms of shōjo manga of the 1970s with depictions of female sexuality as well as for capturing the zeitgeist of her native Tokyo at the time of writing. Since an accident in 1996, she has not published new work.

== Life and career ==
=== Childhood and early career ===
Kyoko Okazaki was born in 1963 in Tokyo. Her father was a hairdresser and held a large drawing room. She lived in the house in a family extended to fifteen people, including grandparents, uncles and aunts, cousins, and apprentice hairdressers. Okazaki often wondered what the family and the home can represent in these conditions. She recounts that while living in a happy and peaceful environment, she was not able to feel at ease in this large family.

In 1983, while studying at Atomi University, Okazaki made her debut as a professional manga artist with a short story in Manga Burikko, an erotic hentai manga magazine primarily aimed for adult men. She published several more short stories in the magazine. In 1985, after graduating from college, she published her first manga series Virgin, and in 1989, she wrote Pink, which is about an office worker in her early 20s who works as a call girl at night in order to help support her pet crocodile. This work firmly established her reputation as a manga artist. Okazaki also worked on the series Tokyo Girls Bravo, which was published in CUTIE, a mainstream Japanese fashion magazine aimed at teens. Okazaki has also worked as a fashion illustrator herself.

In 1992, she released Happy House, which is about a 13-year-old daughter of a television director and actress, who are often too busy to care for her children. When the teenager faces the possible divorce of her parents, she does not want to live with her father or mother, because she feels that she cannot be happy with either one of them. Instead, she dreams of leaving her home to live alone and earn her own money so she can emancipate herself from her parents.

=== Later career in the 1990s ===
While previously, shōjo manga magazines would not publish Okazaki's work, in the 1990s new manga magazines with an older female audience appeared, such as Feel Young and Young Rose. She mainly worked for these magazines from then on.

In 1994, Okazaki put on a solo exhibition at the grand opening of the experimental art space, P-House, in Tokyo. From 1993 to 1994, she did a serialization called River's Edge and portrayed the conflicts and problems experienced by high-schoolers living in a suburb in Tokyo. This series had a big influence on the literary world.

From 1995 to 1996, she worked on Helter Skelter, which features a beautiful model, Ririko, whose body underwent a total cosmetic surgery, and illustrates the accelerating derailment of her success. Here, Okazaki exposes with much reality the obsession, jealousy, and deprivation caused by the desire to acquire “beauty” and the overpowering economic and commercial circumstances surrounding such desire. Helter Skelter was serialized in Shodensha's monthly Feel Young magazine at the time of writing and published later as a single tankōbon volume in 2003.

After her marriage, on May 19, 1996, at approximately 6:30 p.m. JST, Okazaki and her husband were walking near their home when they were hit and run by an SUV driven by a drunk driver. She was seriously injured to the extent that she could not breathe on her own, and her continued disturbance of consciousness forced her to take a creative break and undergo long-term medical treatment. She has not published new work since.

== Style and themes ==
=== Zeitgeist of the 1980s and 1990s ===
Okazaki focused her work on contemporary urban life in Tokyo during the time that Japan witnessed an economic downturn in its transition from bubble economy of the 1980s to the Lost Decade of the 1990s. She is often credited with capturing the zeitgeist of Japanese society at the time her work was published. Over the course of her work, she shows the shift of Japan to a more individualist rather than collectivist society. According to Masanao Amano, her storytelling tries to evoke the feelings loneliness and emptiness that were characteristic for the time.

The main characters in some of her works such as Kuchibiru kara Sandanjuu and Tokyo Girls Bravo are bold, full of emotional expression and freewheeling, holding unconventional sets of values. The protagonists, especially in her later work in the mid-1990s, on the other hand such as Yumiko in Pink and Ririko in Helter Skelter carry feelings of doubt and regret that overshadow their life choices. According to Takeshi Hamano, her characters are typically described as "material girls". They are "daring to choose for, and express, themselves as they inexhaustibly consume goods and even bodies, only to find themselves lost and full of doubt and regret in the succeeding 'flat culture' where people’s lives are more individualized and distinctions between high and low cultures are blurred."

She works with intertextuality in her work, making many references to popular culture. Okazaki includes trends and jargons of the time as well as references to films, novels, pop music and contemporary philosophical ideas. Throughout her work, she has made references to other manga, including Akimi Yoshida's Kisshō Tennyo and Yumiko Ōshima's Banana Bread Pudding.

=== Gender and sexuality ===
Okazaki is known for reappropriating the concept of girl and things considered girly, such as the color pink and nail polish, for young adult women. Okazaki's framing of her protagonists in their twenties and thirties as "girls" (onnanoko) comes with a refusal of societal norms around femininity and a battle against the patriarchal system. Alwyn Spies notes that Okazaki's work, while also targeting young adult women, was distinct from the soap opera style of the Ladies comics of the 1980s due to Okazaki's reappropriation of girlhood through shōjo manga aesthetics. Okazaki is considered one of the early forebears of the gyaru manga style. Like in classic shōjo manga, the protagonist of Pink (1989) is young, female, beautiful, rich and fashionable.

Breaking the norms of 1970s shōjo manga, her work featured explicit depictions of female sexuality and discussed sexuality by including themes like sex, sex work, homosexuality, incest and death. When speaking about Pink (1989), Spies explains that Okazaki juxtaposes shōjo "fantasy" characteristics with the pornographic "realities" of sex work and pornographic visual grammar. When writing about sex work and marriage in the context of her work Pink, she has explained that her depiction of love is always related to capitalism: "All work is also love. Love. Yes, love. 'Love' is not as warm or as fuzzy as it seems when people talk about it normally. Probably. It's more like a formidable, fierce, frightful, and cruel monster. So is capitalism."

Influenced by the New Wave movement in manga in the late 1970s and early 1980s, her first work was published in erotic and pulp magazines that were open to the aesthetics of shōjo manga. Together with other female artists who worked for hentai magazines such as Erica Sakurazawa, Shungicu Uchida and Yōko Kondo, she is sometimes referred to as "onna no ko H mangaka" ("women H cartoonists").

Spies relates her work to third wave feminism for a variety of reasons: For reappropriating girl-ness, sexuality and sexuist language as well as for Okazaki's interest in punk and rock music. In her manga, she has made references to musicians like The Slits and Kim Gordon from Sonic Youth, who is considered a pioneer of the Riot Grrrl movement.

== Reception and legacy ==
Okazaki's work led to an academic debate about the gendered dimension of her audience and its relevance to feminism. Her work has gotten exceptional attention from male manga critics and manga fans. Some feminist manga scholars such as Kazuko Nimiya have dismissed Okazaki's work because of this, as they found her depictions of sexuality led to an objectifying reception of her work by the male gaze.

In 2003 she received the Excellence Prize in the manga division of the Japan Media Arts Festival and in the following year the Tezuka Osamu Cultural Prize, both for Helter Skelter.

More than 20 years after taking a break from writing, her past works were still being reprinted intermittently and had also been made into live-action movies. Her work has been translated, among others, into English, French and German. In 2013, American Kodansha imprint Vertical, Inc. published the manga in English under the title Helter Skelter: Fashion Unfriendly.

== Bibliography ==
Title	Year	Notes	Refs
Virgin (バージン, Bājin)	1983–84; 1985 (vol.)	Serialized in Manga Burikko; Published by Byakuya Shobo	
Second Virgin (セカンド バージン, Sekando Bājin)	1985–86; 1986 (vol.)	Serialized in Action / Futabasha; Published by Futabasha	
Boyfriend Is Better (ボーイフレンド is ベター, Bōifurendo Izu betā)	1985–86; 1986 (vol.)	Serialized in Asuka/Kadokawa Shoten / Jets Comics; Published by Hakusensha	
Taikutsu ga Daisuki (退屈が大好き; lit. "I love boredom")	1987	Serialized in Comic Skola; Published by Kawadeshoboshinsha	
Take It Easy (TAKE IT EASY (テイクイットイージー), Teikuittoījī)	1986–87; 1989 (vol.)	Serialized in Comic Burger; Published by Sony Magazine	
Kuchibiru kara Sandanjuu (ja:くちびるから散弾銃; lit. "Shotgun from lips")	1987–90	Serialized in Monthly Me Twin; Published by Kodansha, 2 volumes	
Georama Boy Panorama Girl (ja:ジオラマボーイ パノラマガール; Jioramabōi panoramagāru)	1988; 1989	Serialized in Heibon Punch; Published by Magazine House	
Suki Suki Daikirai (好き好き大嫌い)	1989	Published in various magazines Published by Takarajimasha	
Pink	1989	Serialized in New Punch Zaurus; Published by Magazine House	
Chocola na Kimochi (ショコラな気持ち)	1990	Published by Fusousha	
Tokyo Girls Bravo (ja:東京ガールズブラボー, Tōkyō gāruzuburabō)	1990–92; 1993 (vol.)	Serialized in Monthly Cutie; Published by Takarajimasha, 2 volumes	
Rock	1989–90; 1991 (vol.)	Serialized in Monthly Cutie; Published by Takarajimasha	
Happy House (ハッピィ ハウス, Happi Hausu)	1990–91; 1992	Serialized in Comic Giga; Published by Shufu to Seikatsusha, 2 volumes	
Kikenna Futari (危険な二人, Dangerous Twosome)	1991–92; 1992 (vol.)	Serialized in Young Rose; Published by Kadokawa Shoten	
Cartoons (カトゥーンズ, Kato~ūnzu)	1990–92; 1992 (vol.)	serialized in Monthly Kadokawa June issues Published by Kadokawa Shoten	
Chocola Everyday (ショコラ・エブリデイ, Shokora eburidei)	1989–91; 1992 (vol.)	Serialized in Peewee/Sony Magazines; Published by Mainichi Shinbunsha	
Ai no Seikatsu (愛の生活, La Vie d'Amour; Life of Love)	1992–93; 1993 (voi.)	Serialized on Young Rose; Published by Kadokawa Shoten	
Magic Point (マジック ポイント)	1993	Serialized in Feel Comics; Published by Shodensha	
River's Edge (リバーズ エッジ)	1993–94; 1994 (vol.)	Serialized in Monthly Cutie; Published by Takarajimasha	
End of the World (エンド オヴ ザ ワールド)	1994	Published by Shodensha	
Am I Your Toy? (私は貴兄(あなた)のオモチャなの, Watashi wa Anata no Omocha nano?)	1994; 1995 (vol.)	Published in Monthly Feel Young; Published by Shodensha	
Heterosexual (ヘテロセクシャル)	1995	Serialized in Young Rose; Published by Kadokawa Shoten	
Chiwawa-chan (チワワちゃん, Chihuahua-chan)	1996	serialized in Young Rose; Published by Kadokawa Shoten	
Untitled (アンタイトルド)	1998	Serialized in Asuka Comics Deluxe; Published by Kadokawa Shoten	
Helter Skelter	1995; 2003 (vol.)	Serialized in Monthly Feel Young; Published by Shodensha	
Like What Is Falling Love? (恋とはどういうものかしら?, Ai to wa dō iu mono kashira?)	2003	Published by Magazine House	
Utakata no Hibi (うたかたの日々, Utakata Days)	1994–95; 2003 (vol.)	Serialized in Monthly Cutie; Published by Takarajimasha	
Touhou Kenbunroku (東方見聞録)	2008	Published by Syogakukan Creative	
Okazaki Kyoko Mikan Sakuhinshu Mori (岡崎京子未刊作品集 森)	2011	Published by Shodensha	
Rude Boy	2012	Published by Takarajimasha	
Rarities (レアリティーズ)	2015	Published by Heibonsha	

== See also ==
- La nouvelle manga

== Literature ==
- Hamano, Takeshi (2019). "Witness to a Transition: The Manga of Kyoko Okazaki and the Feminine Self in the Shift toward 'Flat Culture' in Japanese Consumer Society". In Ogi, Fusami; Suter, Rebecca; Nagaike, Kazumi; Lent, John A. (eds.). Women's Manga in Asia and Beyond. Palgrave Studies in Comics and Graphic Novels. Springer International Publishing. pp. 285–307. doi:10.1007/978-3-319-97229-9_7. ISBN 9783319972282. S2CID 159401888.
- Spies, Alwyn (2003a). Studying Shojo Manga. Global Education, Narratives of the Self and Pathologization of the Feminine. University of British Columbia.
- Spies, Alwyn (2003b). "pink-ness". U.S.-Japan Women's Journal. 25: 30–48.
