= River's Edge (manga) =

Japanese manga series

- Cover to the 2023 release of River's Edge as published by Kodansha USA

リバーズ・エッジ (Ribāzu Ejji)
- Created by: Kyoko Okazaki
- Manga
- Written by: Kyoko Okazaki
- Published by: Takarajimasha
- English publisher: NA: Kodansha USA
- Magazine: CUTiE
- Published: 1994
- Volumes: 1
- Live-action film
- River's Edge (2018)

River's Edge (Japanese: リバーズ・エッジ, Hepburn: Ribāzu Ejji) is a Japanese slice of life manga written and illustrated by Kyoko Okazaki. River's Edge was first published in the women's fashion magazine Monthly Cutie between 1993 and 1994. River's Edge follows Haruna, a high school girl in a suburb of Tokyo, and her friends as they traverse the ups and downs of high-school life in the 90s.

Themes of bullying, homosexuality, drug-use and teenage pregnancy are explored through the lens of a coming of age story. The manga was highly influential in Japanese literature.

A film adaptation of the manga was released in 2018. Kodansha USA publishes the manga in English.

== Characters ==
Haruna Wakakusa (若草ハルナ, Wakakusa Haruna) - The first protagonist of the novel. Haruna is a straightforward and unrelenting teenage girl who saves Ichiro from the bullying of her boyfriend, Kannonzaki.

Ichiro Yamada (山田一郎, Yamada Ichirō) - The second protagonist of the novel. Ichiro is bullied by the other boys at school due to his popularity with girls at school. Quiet and non-chalant, Ichiro is closeted although he dates Kanna to appear straight.

Kozue Yoshikawa (吉川こずえ, Yoshikawa Kozue) - Kozue is one of the most popular girls at the high school. She is a child model and one of Ichiro's only friends aside from Haruna.

Kannonzaki (観音崎, Kanōnzaki) - Hotheaded and rash, Kannonzaki is Haruna's boyfriend. He relentlessly bullies Ichiro due to his popularity with girls at school.

Kanna Tajima (田島カンナ, Tajima Kanna) - Ichiro's girlfriend. She is unaware of his homosexuality and is overprotective of Ichiro.

Lumi (ルミ, Rumi) - One of Haruna's friends. She dates older men for gifts.

== Publications ==
River's Edge was originally published on May 27, 1994, by Takarajimasha in the CUTiE magazine. Since then, the manga has been reprinted three times: in 2000, 2008, and 2015. In 2023, an English translation published by Kodansha USA was released.
