= Banana Fish =

Japanese manga series by Akimi Yoshida

- First tankōbon volume cover, featuring Ash Lynx
- Genre: Drama, thriller
- Created by: Akimi Yoshida
- Manga
- Written by: Akimi Yoshida
- Published by: Shogakukan
- English publisher: NA: Viz Media
- Imprint: Flower Comics
- Magazine: Bessatsu Shōjo Comic
- English magazine: NA: Pulp, Animerica Extra
- Original run: May 1985 – April 1994
- Volumes: 19
- Prequels & related works
- Fly Boy, in the Sky (1984); Angel Eyes (1994); Garden of Light (1994); Private Opinion (1995)
- Anime television series
- Directed by: Hiroko Utsumi
- Produced by: Yuka Okayasu; Kyōko Uryū
- Written by: Hiroshi Seko
- Music by: Shinichi Osawa
- Studio: MAPPA
- Licensed by: Amazon Prime Video (expired) (Note: Streaming rights only.); Anime Limited (Note: Includes both home video and streaming rights for North America, the United Kingdom, Ireland, and France.)
- Original network: Fuji TV (Noitamina)
- Original run: July 5, 2018 – December 20, 2018
- Episodes: 24
- icon

Banana Fish (stylized in all caps) is a Japanese manga series written and illustrated by Akimi Yoshida. It was originally serialized from May 1985 to April 1994 in the shōjo manga (girls' comics) magazine Bessatsu Shōjo Comic. Set primarily in New York City in the 1980s, the series follows street gang leader Ash Lynx as he uncovers a criminal conspiracy involving "banana fish", a mysterious drug that brainwashes its users. In the course of his investigation he encounters Eiji Okumura, a Japanese photographer's assistant with whom he forms a close bond.

The visual and narrative style of Banana Fish, characterized by realist artwork and action-oriented storytelling, represented a significant break from then-established shōjo manga conventions of highly stylized illustration and romantic fantasy-focused stories. While the series was aimed at the shōjo audience of adolescent girls and young adult women, its mature themes and subject material attracted a substantial crossover audience of men and adult women. Its depictions of homoeroticism in this mature, action-oriented context were particularly influential on manga depicting romance between male characters. Banana Fish was acclaimed by critics, who offered praise for the series' plot, dialogue, and action scenes. It is Yoshida's most commercially successful work, with over 12 million copies of collected volumes of the series in circulation as of 2018.

An English-language translation of the series was published by Viz Media, which also serialized Banana Fish in its manga magazines Pulp and Animerica Extra beginning in 1997, making Banana Fish one of the earliest manga series to reach a wide audience in the United States. The series has been adapted several times, notably in 2018 as a 24-episode anime television series directed by Hiroko Utsumi and produced by MAPPA that aired on Fuji TV's Noitamina programming block.

== Plot ==
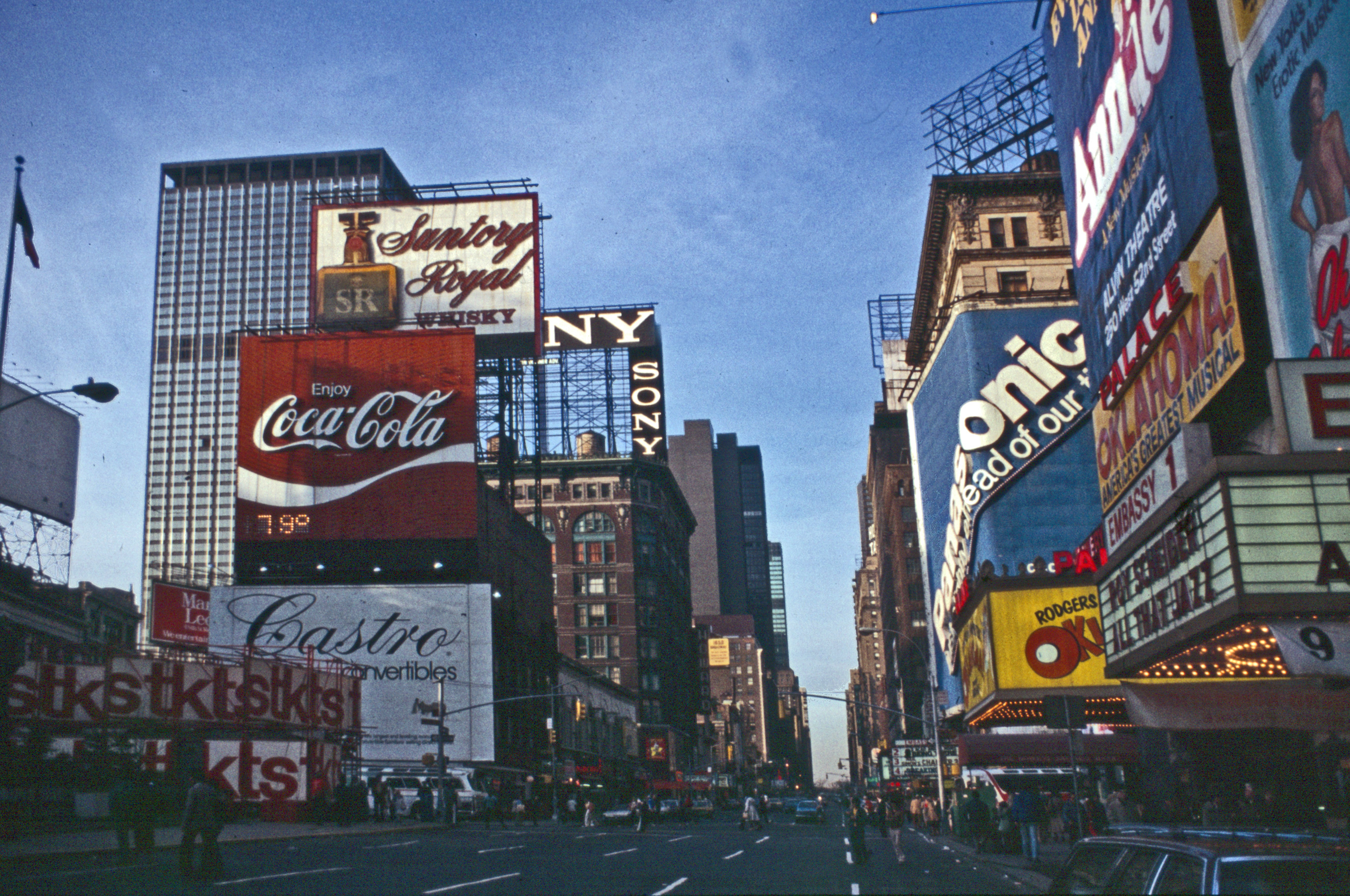
New York City in the 1980s, the primary setting of the series

Banana Fish is set in the United States during the mid-1980s, primarily in New York City. Seventeen-year-old street gang leader Ash Lynx cares for his older brother Griffin, a Vietnam War veteran left in a vegetative state following a traumatic combat incident in which he fired on his own squadron and uttered the words "banana fish". One night, Ash witnesses two of his gang members kill a man who instructs Ash to "seek banana fish" before dying. The two gang members tell Ash they were acting on orders from Dino Golzine, the head of the Corsican mafia in New York; Ash was formerly an enforcer and child sex slave to Golzine, having been groomed from a young age to become the eventual heir to his criminal enterprise.

Ash begins to investigate "banana fish" but is impeded in this endeavor by Golzine, leading him to turn on his former patron. Ash encounters multiple allies and enemies in the course of his dual efforts to uncover the meaning of "banana fish" and dismantle Golzine's criminal empire: chief among his confidants is Eiji Okumura, a Japanese photographer's assistant who has travelled to New York to complete a report on street gangs, and with whom Ash forms a close bond. It gradually transpires that "banana fish" is a drug developed by an American military doctor during the Vietnam War that brainwashes its users; early versions of the drug were tested on American soldiers, including Griffin, which drove them to insanity. Its perfected formula has been acquired by Golzine, who intends to sell the drug to factions within the United States government, who in turn seek to use it to overthrow communist governments in South America.

Ultimately, Golzine is killed in a climactic battle, his government co-conspirators are exposed as participants in his child sex trafficking ring, and all evidence of the banana fish project is destroyed. Ash comes to recognize the danger he exposes Eiji to, and reluctantly ceases all contact with him. Eiji returns to Japan, though prior to his departure, he writes Ash a letter in which he tells him that "my soul is always with you." While distracted by the letter, Ash is fatally stabbed by a rival gang lieutenant. He staggers into the New York Public Library Main Branch where he dies, smiling and clutching Eiji's letter.

== Production ==
=== Context ===
Shōjo manga (Japanese teenage girls' comics) entered a period of significant creative development beginning in the 1970s, characterized by the emergence of new narrative and visual styles, and the ascendance of female manga artists into what had formerly been a category dominated by male creators. Manga such as The Rose of Versailles (1972–1973) by Riyoko Ikeda established non-Japanese settings and androgynous characters as a common motif for shōjo manga, while works by Moto Hagio, Keiko Takemiya, and other artists associated with the Year 24 Group originated shōnen-ai (male-male romance) as a distinct subgenre of shōjo manga. Early Year 24 Group shōnen-ai typically depicted romanticized European or historic Japanese settings, though works that depicted homosexuality by artists unassociated with the group such as Fire! (1969–1971) by Hideko Mizuno depicted unidealized American settings, and frequently included one or more Japanese characters that served as a point of reference and identification for Japanese readers.

Banana Fish creator Akimi Yoshida made her debut as a manga artist in 1977, having originally been inspired to pursue a career in manga after watching a revival screening of the 1969 film Midnight Cowboy while in high school. The film, which depicts the relationship between a con man and a male hustler in New York City, had a profound impact on Yoshida, and influenced her to create works that replicated its themes of close spiritual and fraternal bonds between men. Yoshida would first explore these themes in her debut serial manga series California Story (1978–1981), which depicts themes of homoeroticism in a New York City setting, and which manga scholar Yukari Fujimoto regards as a narrative and thematic precursor to Banana Fish.

=== Development ===
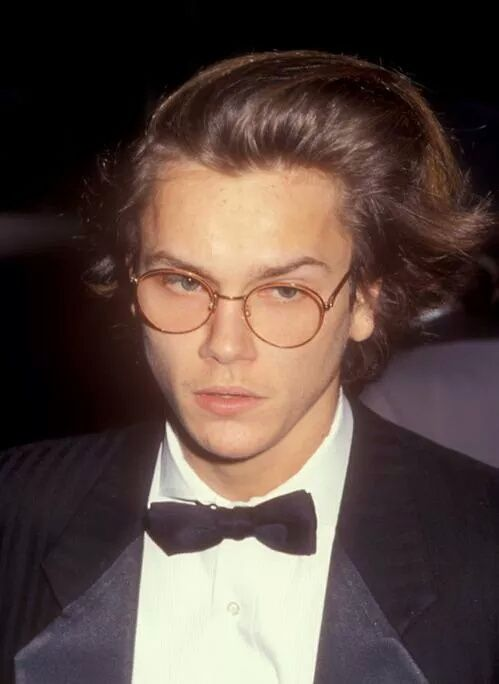
Ash's physical appearance is initially based on tennis player Stefan Edberg before shifting to a design based on actor River Phoenix (pictured in 1989).

Yoshida did not have a fixed composition for the plot of Banana Fish from its outset; while she had a general idea of the series' story, the particulars of plot and characters were developed throughout its serialization. Owing to the influence of Midnight Cowboy, Yoshida sought to create Banana Fish as story focused on an emotionally intense relationship between two characters, who became Ash and Eiji. Originally, Ash was conceived as an upbeat character inspired by shōnen manga protagonists, as Yoshida sought to contrast the moody protagonists typical of her other works, while Eiji was originally conceived as a female character. In the latter case, Eiji was made male due the character's largely passive role in the story, and Yoshida's personal dislike of inert female deuteragonists in manga who exist solely as a source of conflict or romance for the male protagonist.

Yoshida's style as a manga artist – as exemplified by Banana Fish – deviated significantly from typical shōjo manga of its era in terms of narrative, character, setting, mood, and visual style. Writer and translator Frederik L. Schodt notes that while Yoshida's works adhere to certain conventions of shōjo manga as textual and subtextual homoeroticism, she at the same time adopts "a completely masculine art style, eschewing flowers and bug eyes in favor of tight bold strokes, action scenes, and speed lines". She forgoed many of the shōjo conventions made popular by the Year 24 Group – highly stylized character designs, a focus on romance and fantasy, grandiloquent writing – in favor of artwork that was stripped-down and realistic, panels that focused on characters and actions over backgrounds and environments, and frequent action sequences. Her characters are drawn as realistically proportioned, contrasting both the "willowy bodies" typical of men in shōjo manga and the "hyperdefined anatomy" typical of men in shōnen manga (teenage boys' manga). (Note: Yoshida's preference for realistically proportionate, well-built men in her manga once led manga scholar Yukari Fujimoto to remark that "the body type of the men that Akimi Yoshida draws is what gay men like.") In contrast to the European settings popular in shōjo manga of the 1970s, Yoshida expressed a general disinterest in European culture and "English pretty boy types", preferring instead the "carefree attitude" of working-class American men.

The physical appearance of many of the characters in Banana Fish is based on real-life public figures: Ash's appearance is based on tennis player Stefan Edberg in the earliest chapters of the series before shifting to a design based on actor River Phoenix, while Eiji is based on actor Hironobu Nomura. (Note: Additionally, Max Lobo is based on actor Harrison Ford, Shunichi Ibe is based on actor Mitsuru Hirata, Dino Golzine is based on actor Telly Savalas, Shorter Wong is based on musician Sunplaza Nakano Kun, Frederick Arthur is based on the musician Sting, Charlie is based on actor William Katt, and Jenkins is based on actor Danny DeVito.) Yoshida likened this process of selecting real-life figures to depict as characters to casting a "B-grade action movie". The author developed an interest in River Phoenix after watching his 1986 film The Mosquito Coast while visiting the United States; she was unaware Phoenix also appeared in the 1986 film Stand By Me, which she had previously seen, and became intrigued by Phoenix's range as an actor given the differences between the two characters. Yoshida notes how as Ash's design shifted from the Edberg to the Phoenix design his physicality shifts as well, from "athletic and solidly-built" to a "slender pretty boy".

Despite her lack of fixed composition for the story, Yoshida intended from the earliest stages of the series' development to have Banana Fish conclude with Ash's death. She briefly reconsidered this approach following Phoenix's death in 1993 at the age of 23, as she did not wish the series to be perceived as making light of a real-life tragedy. In discussing her rationale for Ash's death, Yoshida has indicated her fascination with people who live intensely and die young, describing Ash as a person who "lived his full life in 17 years"; further, Yoshida believed that as Ash had committed acts of violence and murder throughout the series, he needed to pay for these actions with his own life. The seeming ignominy of Ash's death at the hands of a low-level gang member was intentional on Yoshida's part; a protagonist who seems to die meaninglessly recurs as a motif in shōnen manga (such as Ashita no Joe), Midnight Cowboy, and Yoshida's own California Story.

The concept of the mind-controlling banana fish drug originated from Yoshida's interest in Central Intelligence Agency research into mind control, such as MKUltra and Project ARTICHOKE, and her research into similar programs in the Soviet Union leading her to consider drugs as a tool for warfare. Yoshida has had an intellectual interest in drugs since high school, noting that her generation was influenced by and developed knowledge of drugs in a broad sense due to the influence of the drug culture of the era. The author has stated that depicting Cold War-era politics became more difficult as political realities changed over the course of Banana Fish's nearly decade-long run – principally the dissolution of the Soviet Union mid-serialization – but that she ultimately did not strive for strict realism in her depiction of politics and current events.

=== Release ===
Banana Fish began serialization in the May 1985 issue of the manga magazine Bessatsu Shōjo Comic, a monthly supplement to the manga magazine Shōjo Comic, where it ran until its conclusion in the April 1994 issue. The total length of the series is roughly 3,400 pages. Bessatsu Shōjo Comic publisher Shogakukan also published Banana Fish as nineteen collected volumes under its Flower Comics imprint.

The series was released amid the so-called "manga boom" of the mid-1980s and 1990s, which saw the popularity of manga increase amid the emergence of new creators, series, genres, and magazines, as well as an increase in the popularity of manga in international markets. North American publisher Viz Media serialized an English-language translation of Banana Fish as a launch title for its manga magazine Pulp beginning in 1998. When Pulp folded in 2002, serialization of Banana Fish continued in Animerica Extra, which itself folded in 2004. Viz also published two editions of collected volumes of Banana Fish. The first, published from 1999 to 2002 and spanning the first seven volumes, features flipped artwork and censors some expletives. The second, published from 2004 to 2007 and spanning the full 19 volumes, is printed in the original right-to-left format and includes a re-translated script. The series was reprinted by Viz in 2018, shortly after the release of the anime adaptation of Banana Fish.

==== List of volumes ====
No.	Original release date	Original ISBN	English release date	English ISBN
1	December 15, 1986	4-09-132451-7	January 8, 1999 (1st ed.); March 3, 2004 (2nd ed.)	978-1569313206 (1st ed.); 978-1569319727 (2nd ed.)
2	January 26, 1987	4-09-132452-5	May 6, 1999 (1st ed.); May 5, 2004 (2nd ed.)	978-1569313695 (1st ed.); 978-1569319734 (2nd ed.)
3	March 26, 1987	4-09-132453-3	December 8, 1999 (1st ed.); August 17, 2004 (2nd ed.)	978-1569314388 (1st ed.); 978-1591161066 (2nd ed.)
4	June 26, 1987	4-09-132454-1	March 8, 2001 (1st ed.); October 19, 2004 (2nd ed.)	978-1569315446 (1st ed.); 978-1591161332 (2nd ed.)
5	November 26, 1987	4-09-132455-X	January 9, 2002 (1st ed.); December 14, 2004 (2nd ed.)	978-1569316733 (1st ed.); 978-1591164173 (2nd ed.)
6	May 26, 1988	4-09-132456-8	March 12, 2002 (1st ed.); February 8, 2005 (2nd ed.)	978-1569316955 (1st ed.); 978-1-59116-418-0 (2nd ed.)
7	December 15, 1988	4-09-132457-6	November 13, 2002 (1st ed.); April 5, 2005 (2nd ed.)	978-1569318430 (1st ed.); 978-1-59116-419-7 (2nd ed.)
8	July 26, 1989	4-09-132458-4	June 7, 2005	978-1-59116-420-3
9	October 26, 1989	4-09-132459-2	August 16, 2005	978-1-59116-863-8
10	July 26, 1990	4-09-132460-6	October 11, 2005	978-1-4215-0048-5
11	October 26, 1990	4-09-133531-4	December 13, 2005	978-1-4215-0134-5
12	April 25, 1991	4-09-133532-2	February 14, 2006	978-1-4215-0260-1
13	October 26, 1991	4-09-133533-0	April 11, 2006	978-1-4215-0390-5
14	May 26, 1992	4-09-133534-9	June 13, 2006	978-1-4215-0524-4
15	October 26, 1992	4-09-133535-7	August 8, 2006	978-1-4215-0525-1
16	April 26, 1993	4-09-133536-5	October 10, 2006	978-1-4215-0526-8
17	October 26, 1993	4-09-133537-3	December 12, 2006	978-1-4215-0527-5
18	March 26, 1994	4-09-133538-1	February 13, 2007	978-1-4215-0876-4
19	September 26, 1994	4-09-133539-X	April 10, 2007	978-1-4215-0877-1

== Related media ==
=== Side stories ===
In addition to the main manga series, Yoshida wrote and illustrated four one-shot (single-chapter manga) side stories:

- Fly Boy, In The Sky, a prequel to Banana Fish, originally published in the Winter 1984 issue of the manga magazine Bessatsu LaLa. The manga focuses on Ibe and Eiji's first meeting, and the events that lead to Ibe taking on Eiji as his assistant.
- Angel Eyes, a prequel published in June 1994 issue of Bessatsu Shōjo Comic. It focuses on Ash and Shorter Wong's first meeting while in juvenile prison together.
- Garden of Light (光の庭; "The Garden With Holy Light"), a postscript set seven years after the events Banana Fish, originally published in the August 1994 issue of Bessatsu Shōjo Comic. The story follows Akira Ibe, the niece of Shunichi Ibe, as she visits New York City and stays with Eiji, now an accomplished photographer living in Greenwich Village.
- Private Opinion, a side story published in the January 1995 issue of Bessatsu Shōjo Comic. The manga tells the story of Ash and Blanca's first meeting after Golzine hires Blanca to train Ash in combat.

All four stories were encapsulated in Banana Fish: Another Story, a collected edition published by Shogakukan in 1997. The collection also includes Ura Banana (うら BANANA), a comedic fourth wall-breaking story where Ash and Eiji discuss fan mail the series has received with Yoshida.

=== Anime ===
Banana Fish was adapted into a 24-episode anime series produced by MAPPA and directed by Hiroko Utsumi, which aired on Fuji TV's Noitamina programming block and Amazon Prime Video from July 5 to December 20, 2018. The series was produced as a part of a commemoration project to mark the 40th anniversary of Yoshida's debut as a manga artist. The adaptation revises the setting of the series from the 1980s to the 2010s, adding modern references such as smartphones and substituting the Vietnam War with the Iraq War. On November 30, 2025, Amazon released English- and Spanish-language dubbed versions of Banana Fish produced using AI-generated voice acting. The release was Amazon's first anime dub to be produced using AI, and was removed from the platform after several days following widespread criticism and negative reactions to the performances. On July 12, 2026, Netflix announced that they have acquired the streaming rights to the anime for the US, Canada, UK, Ireland, and France and that a new dub (in both English and French) will be produced using human actors. The English dub was released on August 12, 2026.

=== Other adaptations & tie-ins ===
A radio drama adaptation of Banana Fish was produced by NHK in 1994, with a cast that featured Tohru Furusawa as the voice of Ash and Kazuhiko Inoue as the voice of Eiji. The adaptation was later released on CD, and was re-broadcast in 2018. Two novelizations of Banana Fish have been published. The first, a four-volume series written by Akira Endō, was published by KSS Comic Novels in 1998. Titled Banana Fish: Makkusu Robo no Shuki (Banana Fish マックス・ロボの手記; "Banana Fish: Memoir of Max Lobo"), the series tells the story of the manga from Max's perspective. The second, a three-volume series written by Miku Ogasawara based on the Banana Fish anime, was published by Shogakukan Bunko in 2018. Stage play adaptations of Banana Fish have been produced in 2005, 2009, 2012, and 2021. According to Yoshida, film rights for a live-action film adaptation of Banana Fish were at one point granted to Ryuichi Sakamoto, but no film was ever produced.

Shogakukan, which published the Banana Fish manga, has published several art books related to the series, including the art book Angel Eyes in 1994 and the companion book Rebirth: The Banana Fish Official Guidebook in 2001. The company also published New York Sense in 2001, an art book credited to "Eiji Okumura" and marketed as a book of photographs taken by the character.

== Themes and analysis ==
=== Homosexuality ===
There's nothing wrong with manga that make eroticism and teasing their focus, but if you want to make character and narrative your focus, I think you have to show some self-discipline as a creator. If you do so, you may also achieve more profound effects than if you just went for the fan service and easy thrills. I think some Banana Fish fans would argue that Ash and Eiji's relationship ends up being much more romantic because Yoshida places the emphasis on the struggles they face together, not the snuggles.

— Carl Gustav Horn, editor and translator of the English language edition of Banana Fish

Banana Fish depicts homosexuality both in the text of the story through representations of male-male rape, and as subtext through the ambiguously homoerotic relationship between Ash and Eiji. Male homosexuality is a recurring motif in shōjo manga; while works created in the 1970s by artists associated with the Year 24 Group formalized shōjo manga featuring male homosexuality as a distinct subgenre known as shōnen-ai, homoerotic themes and subjects had long been a feature of shōjo manga. Banana Fish would come to represent a shift for depictions of homosexuality in shōjo manga, towards older protagonists and realist writing and artwork, and away from the schoolboy romances and melodramas that had previously defined the genre. Some manga scholars such as Yukari Fujimoto consider Banana Fish as belonging to a continuous artistic canon that includes works by the Year 24 Group, while others such as James Welker argue that Banana Fish is narratively and stylistically closer to the boys' love genre of male-male romance manga that emerged in the 1990s.

Despite Banana Fish's influence and prominence as a manga depicting homosexuality, the central relationship between Ash and Eiji is never rendered as overtly romantic or sexual. Critic Ted Anderson argues that a romantic dimension to Ash and Eiji's bond can be readily inferred from the subtext of the story, writing that "the astute reader understands the unspoken elements of Ash and Eiji's relationship". Manga critic Jason Thompson similarly describes the series as a "love story" expressed "so subtly as to be invisible", noting how "the sensuality in this manga is in Ash teaching Eiji how to shoot a gun, or Ash and Eiji's friendly, teasing, couple-like dialogue." Manga scholar Christina Parte argues that the non-physical nature of Ash and Eiji's relationship mirrors typical shōjo manga romances, which commonly focus on a chaste relationship between a man and woman that is never physically consummated; Eiji's sexual and romantic inexperience is similarly typical of a shōjo manga protagonist. Thompson considers several potential explanations for the largely subtextual nature of Ash and Eiji's relationship, including Yoshida's stated desire to focus on the emotional connection between the characters, that Yoshida did not wish to risk eroticizing the manga's themes of rape by depicting a romantic or sexual relationship, and the potential influence of manga censorship codes in limiting displays of same-sex romance and sex.

=== Gender ===
While the cast of Banana Fish is almost entirely male, several characters – notably Ash and Eiji – are bishōnen (literally "beautiful boys"), a term for visually androgynous male characters who blend masculine and feminine qualities. Scholars have considered how bishōnen are regarded as desirable by a female audience not merely for their physical attractiveness, but because they allow this audience to vicariously experience romance, agency, and personal autonomy through a character that is unconstrained by patriarchy. While romance between bishōnen is tolerated in some contexts in Japan and is thus not necessarily transgressive or subversive on its face, Parte argues that Ash and Eiji's status as bishōnen allows them to "transgress Japanese gender norms" by resisting gender roles typically associated with female Japanese adolescents.

Per Parte, Ash and Eiji express a degree of gender ambivalence by alternating between masculinized and feminized agency. Ash embodies typically masculine agency in his position as a leader of a street gang, but is frequently feminized through the rape he suffers at the hands of men. Conversely, Eiji possesses the typically feminine trait of nurturing domesticity – he soothes Ash when he is troubled, treats his wounds, and remains at home while Ash fights – but towards the end of the series, it is ultimately Eiji who takes up arms to free an emaciated Ash from Golzine's clutches. Parte argues that despite the American setting of the series, Ash's quest for self-determination ultimately represents a rejection of restrictive Japanese gender roles: both the "good son" (becoming Golzine's heir) and the "obedient wife" (becoming Golzine's sex slave). Thus, through Ash and Eiji's struggles, the ostensibly female reader is able to "escape from Japanese reality" and "resist the pressures of a highly hierarchical gender and sexual system".

=== Occidentalism ===
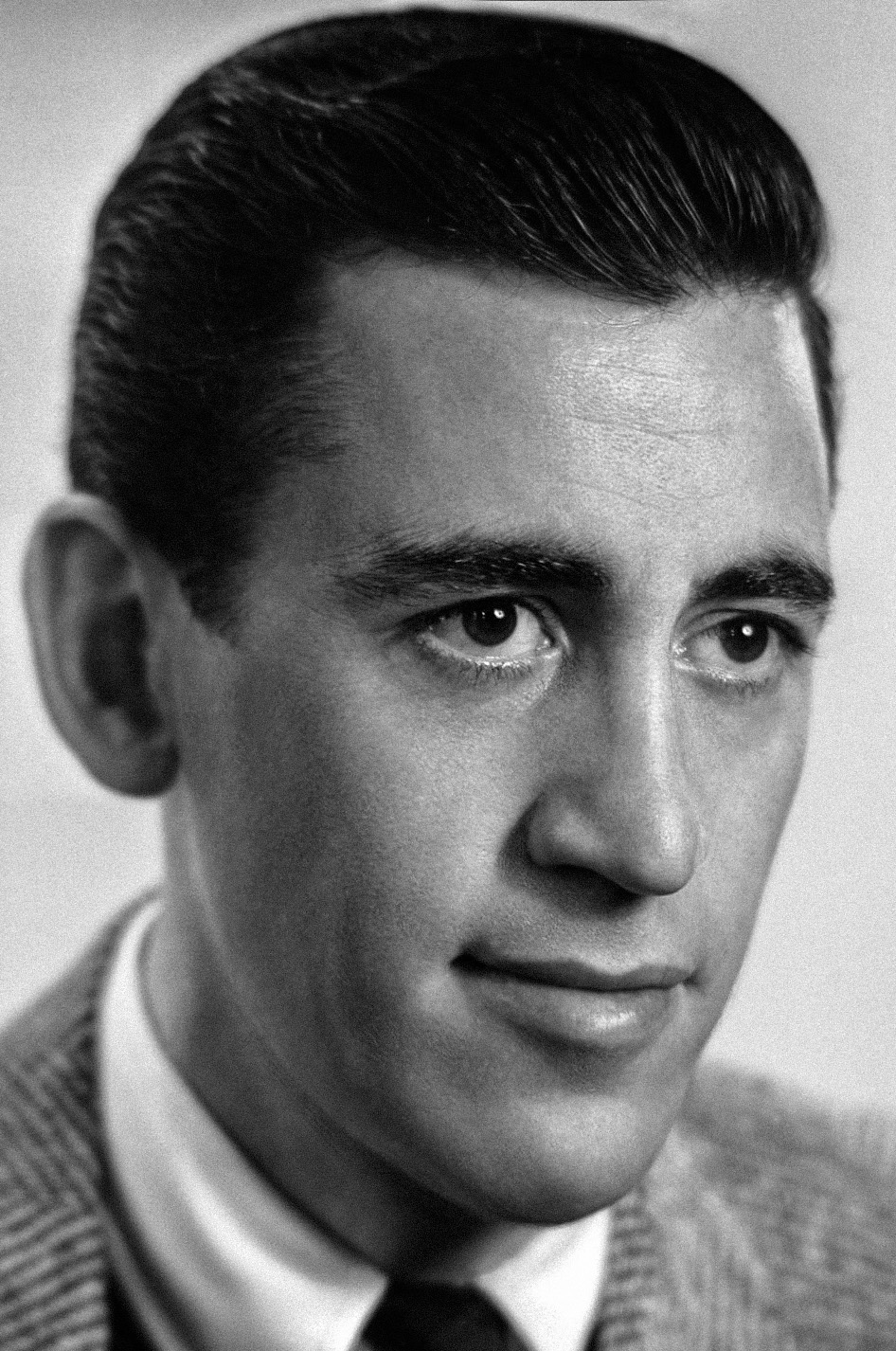
The title of the series references the short story "A Perfect Day for Bananafish" by J. D. Salinger (pictured in 1950).

The release of Banana Fish in the late 1980s coincided with a period of fascination with New York City in Japanese popular culture. Schodt notes how the series reflects the Japanese perception of 1980s New York as a "modern Wild West" characterized by rampant crime, drug use, poverty, and racial tension that was "a symbol of everything that was wrong with America", but which at the same time "seemed symbolic of America's raw energy and exciting individual freedoms". Within the New York of the story, Eiji functions as an intermediary for the Japanese reader, echoing earlier manga such as Fire! that used Japanese characters to link works in American settings to their Japanese readership. Parte argues that it is "tempting to see in Eiji the personification of reverse orientalism" as a Japanese character who is captivated by an American, but that his status as a bishōnen representing a blending of male and female traits allows him to embody a "female internationalist occidentalism" wherein the female reader can vicariously experience an "exotic American setting" that has fewer limits on personal expression.

Beyond its American setting and characters, Banana Fish features frequent allusions to American literature: Blanca's character arc is drawn from Ernest Hemingway's Islands in the Stream, Ash compares his life to Hemingway's The Snows of Kilimanjaro, and the title of the series itself is a reference to J. D. Salinger's short story "A Perfect Day for Bananafish". The "bananafish" of Salinger's story are fish that eat to excess until they are unable to move, and the story ends with the sudden suicide of the protagonist. The symbolic meaning of the bananafish within "A Perfect Day for Bananafish" is the subject of debate, and the significance of manga's title as an allusion to the story is similarly obscure, as there are few direct references to "A Perfect Day for Bananafish" within the manga. Anderson writes that "there are perhaps connections to Golzine's self-destructive greed and Ash’s seemingly suicidal tendencies, but these connections are tenuous at best." Thompson considers how "both the manga and the story involve life's cruelty, and traumatic experiences, and sudden death", while Parte considers the manga's banana fish drug as symbolizing "male greed, materialism, and destruction". Critic Hisayo Ogushi considers a less allegorical explanation, noting that the protagonist of Salinger's story commits suicide after he envisions the bananafish, just as characters in the manga lose control of themselves after they are given the banana fish drug.

=== Violence ===
The action-oriented plot of Banana Fish, characterized by frequent fight scenes, multi-chapter action set pieces, and the extensive use of speed lines, represented a break from the typical visual and narrative conventions of shōjo manga. Yoshida has stated that her interest in action stems from childhood, specifically her desire to play active sports like soccer instead of typically feminine pursuits such as rhythmic dance, and that the preponderance of male characters in Banana Fish stemmed in part from her difficulty in imagining stereotypically passive girls in these active scenarios. Violence and its dehumanizing effects recur as a major theme throughout the series, as characters struggle to reconcile their humanity with the violent acts they commit and endure. Ash represents the apex of this theme: a character whose traumatic past has left him resigned to a life of violence, and who faces the conflict between his desire for a "normal" life with Eiji, and his desire to "protect Eiji from the horrors of his violent life".

Sexual violence also recurs throughout the series, with depictions of rape that Parte argues echo scenes of sexual abuse of women in erotic manga. Thompson notes how the series does not contain any explicit depictions of sex or nudity, and how rape is depicted "entirely as trauma and never as titillation", contrasting eroticized depictions of rape in BL manga.

== Reception and legacy ==
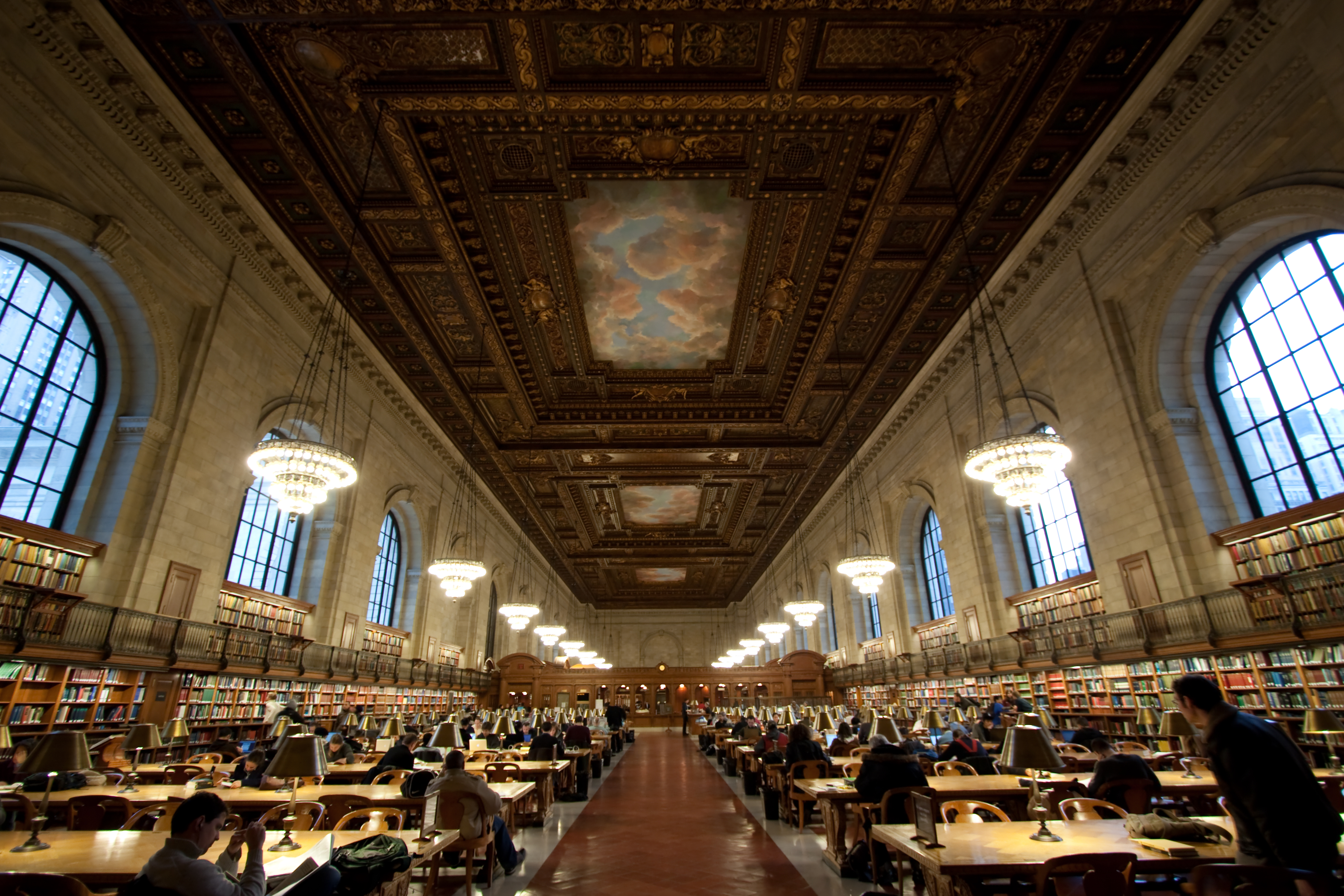
The New York Public Library Main Branch has become a tourist attraction for fans of the series.

By 2018, over 12 million copies of collected volumes of Banana Fish are in print. A 1998 reader's poll in the Japanese magazine Comic Link ranked Banana Fish as the greatest manga of all time. In TV Asahi's 2021 Manga Sōsenkyo, a ranking of the top 100 manga series calculated from a public vote of 150,000 people, Banana Fish ranked 26th.

While Yoshida had published several manga titles prior to Banana Fish, the series became her most critically and commercially successful work, and "cemented her status as a great creator". Though Banana Fish was published and marketed as a shōjo manga, its dense plot, heavy dialogue, and extensive action sequences led it to attract a significant crossover audience of male and adult female readers; (Note: Yoshida has stated that she was aware that the series was a crossover success during its original serialization, but she did not take the interests of a male audience into consideration while writing the series.) Schodt identifies the series as "one of the few girls' manga a red-blooded Japanese male adult could admit to reading without blushing". The series was similarly praised "as an example of mature, plot-driven comics" when it was released in English, and became one of the earliest manga series to reach a wide audience in the United States. Banana Fish was particularly influential on the boys' love genre, inspiring a wave of action-centered boys' love manga which focused on older protagonists and realist artwork, including Fake, Yellow, and Togainu no Chi.

The series has been praised by critics, with Jason Thompson calling it "one of the great shōjo manga epics" and praising its "consciously literary" writing. Its artwork has received a mixed reception among critics: Frederik L. Schodt favorably compares Yoshida's artwork to the "clean-line realism" of artist Katsuhiro Otomo; Thompson, conversely, calls Yoshida's "dull artwork" the "one weakness" of the series, but nevertheless concludes that the "worldview of Banana Fish is so fully realised that the art is almost redundant, and even when the panels are nothing but talking heads, we hang on every word". Banana Fish is the favorite manga of Japanese musician Gackt – the artist claims to have read the series over one hundred times – and inspired the song "Asrun Dream" on his debut album Mars.

The New York Public Library Main Branch, a prominently featured location in the series, has become a tourist attraction for fans of Banana Fish; the New York Public Library reported a significant increase in gift shop revenue in the 2019 fiscal year, which they attributed to popularity generated by Banana Fish. Japanese tourism company Kinki Nippon Tourist Kanto offered a New York City tour featuring stops at locations featured in the series and a guided audio tour narrated by Yuma Uchida and Kenji Nojima, who respectively voice Ash and Eiji in the anime adaptation of Banana Fish, performing in-character. In 2019, the tour was selected by the Japan Travel Industry Association to receive the Minister of Land, Infrastructure, Transport, and Tourism Award at the annual Tour Grand Prix, which honors tourism plans that benefit Japan's travel industry.
