= Sesame (song) =

Single by Kroi
- Released: January 17, 2024
- Genre: Rock
- Length: 3:32
- Label: Irori
- Composer: Kroi
- Lyricist: Leo Uchida

Kroi singles chronology
"Hyper" (2023)	"Sesame" (2024)	"Water Carrier" (2024)

Music video
- "Sesame" on YouTube

"Sesame" is a song recorded by Japanese band Kroi. The song was released on January 17, 2024, under Irori Records.

== Background ==
The song was announced on December 5, 2023, by the band, it was also revealed that the song will serve as the opening theme for the anime Bucchigiri?!.

== Personnel ==
Credits adapted from Apple Music.

Musicians

- Kroi – performer

Technical

- Kroi – composer
- Leo Uchida – lyrics

== Composition ==
Sesame has been described as a "Jamiroquai-esque earworm with a Middle Eastern twang" compared to their previous single "Hyper".

== Charts ==
Weekly chart performance for "Sesame"
Chart (2024)	Peak position
Japan Combined Singles (Oricon)	19
