= Bucchigiri?! =

Japanese anime television series

- Anime key visual
- ぶっちぎり?!
- Genre: Yankī
- Created by: Hiroko Utsumi; Taku Kishimoto; MAPPA; Toho
- Screenplay by: Taku Kishimoto
- Directed by: Hiroko Utsumi
- Music by: Michiru Ōshima
- Country of origin: Japan
- Original language: Japanese
- No. of episodes: 12

Production
- Animator: MAPPA
- Production company: Bucchigiri?! Partners (Note: Label consisting of various companies.)

Original release
- Network: TXN (TV Tokyo)
- Release: January 13 – April 6, 2024

Bucchigiri?! (ぶっちぎり?!) is an original Japanese anime television series produced by MAPPA. It is directed by Hiroko Utsumi with series composition and screenplays by Taku Kishimoto, music by Michiru Ōshima and Takahiro Kagami as character designer. It aired from January 13 to April 6, 2024, on TV Tokyo and its affiliates. The opening theme song is "Sesame", performed by Kroi, while the ending theme song is "Love je t'aime" (らぶじゅてーむ), performed by Mahiru Coda. Crunchyroll streamed the series.

== Plot ==
After Arajin Tomoshibi returns to his hometown and reunites with his childhood friend Matakara Asamine, they become involved in the fights between its gangs and he meets the genie Senya.

== Characters ==
Arajin Tomoshibi (灯 荒仁, Tomoshibi Arajin)
Voiced by: Genki Okawa (Japanese); Alex Mai (English)
Senya (千夜)
Voiced by: Masafumi Kobatake (Japanese); Chris Guerrero (English)
Mahoro (まほろ)
Voiced by: Anna Nagase (Japanese); Lindsay Seidel (English)
Matakara Asamine (浅観音 真宝, Asamine Matakara)
Voiced by: Yūsuke Hoshino (Japanese); Ricco Fajardo (English)
Kenichiro (拳一郎, Kenichirō)
Voiced by: Jiro Saito
Zabu (座布)
Voiced by: Yukihiro Nozuyama (Japanese); Daniel Van Thomas (English)
Komao (駒男)
Voiced by: Kappei Yamaguchi (Japanese); James Marler (English)
Marito (摩利人)
Voiced by: Nozomu Sasaki (Japanese); Kieran Flitton (English)
Outa (王太, Ōta)
Voiced by: Ryōta Takeuchi (Japanese); Wyatt Baker (English)
Jabashiri (蛇走)
Voiced by: Makoto Furukawa (Japanese); Alex Hom (English)
Hagure (刃暮)
Voiced by: Shouta Hayama (Japanese); Van Barr Jr. (English)
Akutaro (阿久太郎, Akutarō)
Voiced by: Chihiro Suzuki (Japanese); Aaron Dismuke (English)

== Episodes ==
No.	Title (Note: All English titles are taken from Crunchyroll.)	Directed by (Note: Information is taken from the ending credits of each episode.)	Storyboarded by	Original release date
1	"Merge?! Fall in Love with Fortune Bang Bang Chicken!"; Transliteration: "Gattai!? Koisuru Fōchun Ban Ban Jī!" (Japanese: 合体！？恋するフォーチュンバンバンジー！)	Hiroko Utsumi	Hiroko Utsumi	January 13, 2024
2	"Wanna Take You On! The Chu Chu Chinese Pepper Steak Train!"; Transliteration: "Kimi o nosetai! Chū Chū・Chinja Orōsutorein!" (Japanese: 君を乗せたい！チューチュー・チンジャオローストレイン！)	Yasutomo Okamoto	Hiroko Utsumi	January 20, 2024
3	"Love at Fist Fight! The One and Only Quail in the World"; Transliteration: "Naguri Ai! Sekai ni Hitotsu Dake no Uzura" (Japanese: なぐり愛！世界に一つだけのウズラ)	Kyouko Yamazaki	Yuuki Itou	January 27, 2024
4	"Stop the War! ~Sometimes You Gotta Eat Goya Chanpuru~"; Transliteration: "Sutoppu Wō! ～Toki ni wa Shokuseyo Gōya Chanpurū～" (Japanese: ストップ戦争(ウォー)！～時には食せよゴーヤチャンプルー～)	Ryouta Kawahara	Shigeyuki Miya	February 3, 2024
5	"Frightening! Chili Shrimps Falling Down Like Snowflakes!"; Transliteration: "Senritsu! Ebi Chili wa Yuki no You ni!" (Japanese: 戦慄! エビチリは雪のように!)	Yasuhiro Geshi	Yoshiyuki Asai	February 10, 2024
6	"Much Much Friendship! "Nira-Reba"-lution 21!"; Transliteration: "Yuujou Mashi Mashi! Nira Liver Lution 21!" (Japanese: 友情マシマシ! ニラレバリューション21!)	Hajime Ootani	Hajime Ootani	February 18, 2024 (Note: This episode aired at 12:00 a.m. JST, 1 hour after the original air time on TV Tokyo.)
6.5	"Revival! Tonight is BUCCHI Back to the Chinese Food!"; Transliteration: "Yomigaeru! Konya wa Bucchi Bakku to the Chūka！" (Japanese: 蘇る！今夜はぶっちーバック to the 中華！)	Unknown	TBA	February 24, 2024
7	"Group Date?! The Sea, Maji Croquette, and I!"; Transliteration: "Gōkon!? Umi to Maji Babu to Watashi!" (Japanese: 合コン！？海とマジバブと私！)	Kyouko Yamazaki; Tomoyo Kamoi; Atsushi Kobayashi; Hiroshi Kobayashi; Shuuhei Yabuta	Tomoyo Kamoi; Takehiko Matsumoto	March 2, 2024
8	"Sad News! Seriously Falling in Love with Gomoku Soba!"; Transliteration: "Hihō! Majide Koisuru Gomoku Soba！" (Japanese: 悲報！マジで恋する五目そば！)	Yasutomo Okamoto	Yasutomo Okamoto	March 9, 2024
9	"Temptation! Soup-Related Etceteras!"; Transliteration: "Yūwaku! Sūpu Nimatsuwaru Etosetora!" (Japanese: 誘惑！スープにまつわるエトセトラ！)	Ai Yukimura	Ai Yukimura	March 16, 2024
10	"Fallen Friend! This Love, This Pain, This Almond Tofu!" (Japanese: 堕ちゆく友！愛しさと切なさと杏仁豆腐と！)	Atsushi Nakagawa	Naoto Uchida	March 23, 2024
11	"Unanswered Wishes! Sudden Crab Fried Rice"; Transliteration: "Todokanu Omoi! Kani Chāhan wa Totsuzen ni" (Japanese: とどかぬ想い！カニチャーハンは突然に)	Yasuhiro Geshi; Hajime Ootani; Tarou Kubo	Hajime Ootani; Yousuke Takada	March 30, 2024
12	"Fateful Duel! Beyond the Gyoza Dumplings"; Transliteration: "Unmei no Tatakai! Gyōza Nomukō" (Japanese: 運命の戦い！餃子ノムコウ)	Hiroko Utsumi; Yasutomo Okamoto; Tomoyo Kamoi	Yoshiyuki Asai; Ai Yukimura; Hiroko Utsumi	April 6, 2024 (Note: This episode aired at 11:15 p.m. JST, 15 minutes after the original air time on TV Tokyo.)
