= Our Little Sister =

- Theatrical release poster
- Directed by: Hirokazu Kore-eda
- Screenplay by: Hirokazu Kore-eda
- Based on: Umimachi Diary by Akimi Yoshida
- Produced by: Kaoru Matsuzaki; Hijiri Taguchi
- Starring: Haruka Ayase; Masami Nagasawa; Kaho; Suzu Hirose; Ryo Kase; Ryohei Suzuki
- Cinematography: Mikiya Takimoto
- Edited by: Hirokazu Kore-eda
- Music by: Yoko Kanno
- Production companies: Toho; GAGA corporation; Fuji Television Network; Shogakukan; TV Man Union
- Distributed by: Toho; GAGA corporation
- Release dates: May 14, 2015 (Cannes); June 13, 2015 (Japan)
- Running time: 126 minutes
- Country: Japan
- Language: Japanese
- Box office: ¥1.55 billion

Our Little Sister (Japanese: 海街 diary, Hepburn: Umimachi Daiarī; lit. "Seaside town diary") is a 2015 Japanese drama film written, directed and edited by Hirokazu Kore-eda and based on Akimi Yoshida's manga series Umimachi Diary. It stars Haruka Ayase, Masami Nagasawa, Kaho and Suzu Hirose. The film follows three sisters living in Kamakura, alongside their half sister. It was selected to compete for the Palme d'Or at the 2015 Cannes Film Festival.

== Plot ==
Three sisters, Sachi Kōda, Yoshino Kōda and Chika Kōda, live in the house of their grandparents in Kamakura. Their parents are divorced. One day, they receive news of the death of their father, whom they have not seen in fifteen years. At the funeral, they meet their half-sister, thirteen year old Suzu Asano. Suzu is living with her stepmother and stepbrother. Observing the behaviour of the stepmother at the funeral (she tries to pass on the responsibility of addressing the guests to Suzu), Sachi guesses that Suzu looked after their father as he died, not the stepmother. At the train station Sachi spontaneously invites Suzu to come and live with them. Suzu joins the local football team and becomes popular as the relationship develops.

== Cast ==
- Haruka Ayase as Sachi Kōda
- Masami Nagasawa as Yoshino Kōda
- Kaho as Chika Kōda
- Suzu Hirose as Suzu Asano, the Kōda's younger half sister
- Ryo Kase as Sakashita
- Kentaro Sakaguchi as Tomoaki Fujii
- Ryohei Suzuki as Yasuyuki Inoue, Suzu's soccer coach in Kamakura
- Takafumi Ikeda
- Ōshirō Maeda
- Midoriko Kimura
- Kirin Kiki as Fumiyo Kikuchi
- Jun Fubuki as Sachiko Ninomiya, a cafe owner
- Lily Franky as Sen-ichi Fukuda
- Shinichi Tsutsumi as Kazuya Shiina, a married doctor who is having an affair with Sachi
- Shinobu Otake as Miyako Sasaki, the mother of Sachi, Yoshino and Chika

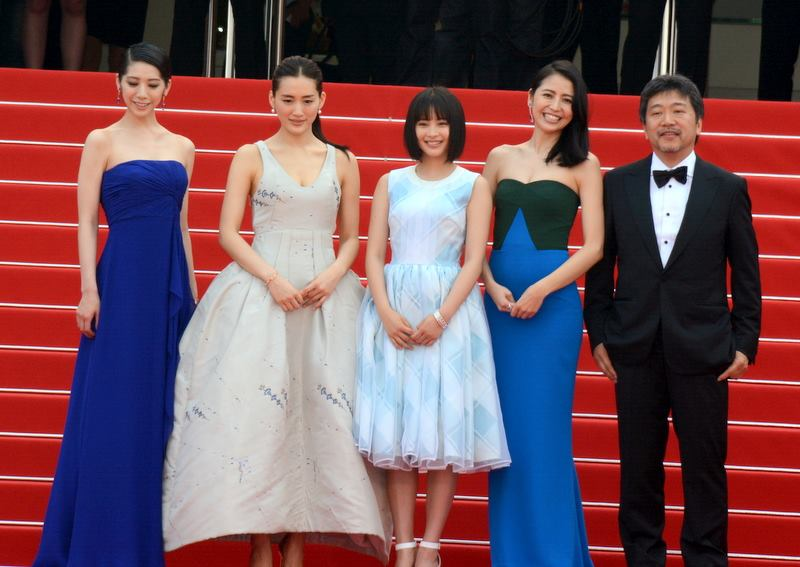
Kore-eda and stars promoting the film at the 2015 Cannes Film Festival.

== Production ==
The film was produced by Fuji Television, Shogakukan, Toho and Gaga Corporation. Principal photography began in July 2014.

== Release ==
The film premiered at the 2015 Cannes Film Festival. The film was released in Japan on June 13, 2015. It premiered as part of the BFI London Film Festival on October 14, 2015. It was released in South Korea in 2016.

=== Box office ===
The film has grossed ¥1.55 billion in Japan.

=== Critical response ===
Rotten Tomatoes reports a 94% approval rating for Our Little Sister, based on 123 critics, with an average score of 7.8/10. The website's critical consensus reads: "Our Little Sister uses the story of one fractured family to offer universal -- and deeply moving -- observations on the human condition." The film also holds a 75/100 average rating on Metacritic, based on 31 critics, indicating "generally favorable reviews". Steven Rea of The Philadelphia Inquirer gave it a full four stars and said that "this is the kind of movie that will leave you feeling restored, maybe a little misty-eyed as well". Calvin Wilson of St. Louis Post-Dispatch referred to it as "a beautiful drama with comedic undertones about the tension between the comforts of family life and the vast possibilities beyond it. ... an insightful film that bears comparison to the work of British directors Mike Leigh and Ken Loach."

A. O. Scott of The New York Times praised the film's plot: "Seeming to wander through small incidents and mundane busyness, it acquires momentum and dramatic weight through a brilliant kind of narrative stealth." He said the film "goes down as easily as a sip of the plum wine the sisters brew and yet leaves the viewer both sated and intoxicated." Kenji Fujishima of The Village Voice found the film less powerful than Kore-eda's Still Walking (2008) and Like Father, Like Son (2013), writing that the film has "an emotional reticence that at times verges on too subtle for its own good. ... moments of bitterness and anguish don't quite have the gut-punch impact they ought to have." Still, Fujishima commended the acting and also lauded one scene as showing "the laudable humanity at the heart of Kore-eda's patient, warmhearted worldview".

It was Christian Blauvelt's choice in IndieWire's 2018 list of the best Japanese films of the 21st century, with Blauvelt writing that "Kore-eda doesn't delve into the histrionics usually involved with depictions of "broken families" in American films – these young women know they have to make do, get on with life, and leave the self-pity behind."

== Accolades ==
Our Little Sister received the most nominations (12) at the 39th Japan Academy Prize, winning four of them including Picture of the Year and Director of the Year. The four actresses who portrayed the sisters were all awarded or nominated for the acting awards (Haruka Ayase was nominated for Outstanding Performance by an Actress in a Leading Role, Masami Nagasawa and Kaho were nominated for Outstanding Performance by a Supporting Actress in a Leading Role and Suzu Hirose won Newcomer of the Year).

The film also won Audience Award at San Sebastián International Film Festival.
