= Helter Skelter (manga) =

1995–96 Japanese psychological horror manga

- Cover of the Helter Skelter tankōbon

ヘルタースケルター (Herutā Sukerutā)
- Genre: Psychological horror
- Manga
- Written by: Kyoko Okazaki
- Published by: Shodensha
- English publisher: NA: Vertical Publishing
- Magazine: Feel Young
- Original run: July 1995 – April 1996
- Volumes: 1
- Live-action film
- Directed by: Mika Ninagawa
- Written by: Arisa Kaneko
- Music by: Kōji Ueno
- Released: July 14, 2012
- Runtime: 127 minutes

Helter Skelter (Japanese: ヘルタースケルター, Hepburn: Herutā Sukerutā) is a Japanese psychological body horror manga written and illustrated by Kyoko Okazaki. It was serialized in Feel Young magazine from 1995 to 1996 and collected into a single tankōbon volume by Shodensha on April 8, 2003. The story was adapted into a 2012 live-action film directed by Mika Ninagawa and starring Erika Sawajiri. The manga was released in English by Vertical in 2013.

== Plot ==
Supermodel Liliko Hirukoma (ひるこまりりこ, Hirukoma Ririko) has undergone full-body plastic surgery to attain a perfect body and face in order to stay on top of the modeling world. However, her body begins to deteriorate as a result of the treatment. Growing desperate and unhinged, she lashes out at her manager Hiroko Tada, her agency, and later to the public as she realizes that her current lifestyle cannot last long. The matter is made worse when Tada introduces Liliko to fellow model Kozue Yoshikawa, whose natural beauty and friendly demeanor make her a fashion icon to women all around, making Liliko more fearful that she will fade into obscurity. In an attempt to stay ahead, Liliko forces her overly stressed-out assistant Michiko Hada and Michiko's boyfriend to sabotage Kozue.

Meanwhile, an inspector investigating a series of mysterious suicides and organ theft believes that Liliko and her unnatural beauty may be the key to unearthing an underground industry of unsafe medical practice. Given a photo of Liliko's former appearance by her overweight, less attractive younger sister Chiharu, the inspector warns Liliko that she may not be able to keep hiding behind her unnatural beauty forever. When Liliko selfishly suggests that Chiharu get the same full-body makeover Liliko has, Chiharu realizes that the Liliko she once knew is gone. She meets with the inspector again, who sympathetically suggests she take a more natural approach by exercising and eating healthier.

Tada asks Kozue if she plans to keep modeling in five years. To Tada's surprise, Kozue admits that she actually looks forward to having a normal life away from the spotlight and does not really care if anyone remembers her or not. Later, Kozue learns of Liliko's plastic surgery, but does not tell anyone.

After losing her job and being dumped by her boyfriend, Hada, having had enough of Liliko's manipulation and cruelty, mails the evidence of Liliko's lies to tabloid magazines everywhere. Despite Tada's efforts to rectify the situation, Liliko, scorned by the public, gouges her eye out with a knife during a press conference, seemingly disappearing from the public afterwards.

Five years later, Kozue is now the top supermodel and the clinic has been further investigated. Tada's agency has shut down as a result of losing her models to the controversy surrounding her involvement with the clinic. The investigator has been transferred to another department, where he encounters Chiharu, who is more attractive as a result of both naturally losing weight and cosmetic surgery. While partying with her makeup artist and friends after a photo shoot in Mexico, Kozue spies Tada for a moment before disappearing. Later, she celebrates the end of the shoot by going to a club notable for its "strange shows" and sees Liliko about to perform, wearing an eyepatch over her left eye.

== Film cast ==
- Erika Sawajiri as Liliko Hirukoma
- Nao Ōmori as Makoto Asada
- Shinobu Terajima as Michiko Hada
- Gō Ayano as Shinichi Okumura
- Kiko Mizuhara as Kozue Yoshikawa
- Hirofumi Arai as Kinji Sawanabe
- Anne Suzuki as Kumi Hosuda
- Susumu Terajima as Keita Tsukahara
- Show Aikawa as Mikio Hamaguchi
- Yōsuke Kubozuka as Takao Nanbu
- Mieko Harada as Hisako Wachi
- Kaori Momoi as Hiroko Tada
- Mariko Sumiyoshi as Chikako "Chiharu" Hirukoma

== Reception ==
Helter Skelter won an award of excellence at the Japan Media Arts Festival sponsored by the Japanese government in 2004. The manga also won the Grand Prize at the 2004 Tezuka Osamu Cultural Prize. In 2008, it was nominated as an Official Selection at the Angoulême International Comics Festival in France.

Reviewing Helter Skelter, Rebecca Silverman of Anime News Network gave the manga an overall A− grade. She believes Okazaki implies that the readers are "implicit in the creation of Lilikos with our craving for unattainable beauty in the media." She noted that some people will find the story difficult to stomach and the artwork "harsh," although the latter helps the story.

As of August 19, 2012, the film had grossed US$24,231,554 at the Japanese box office.
