= Atomi University =

Higher education institution in Saitama Prefecture, Japan

Coordinates: 35°49′1.6″N 139°32′34.5″E

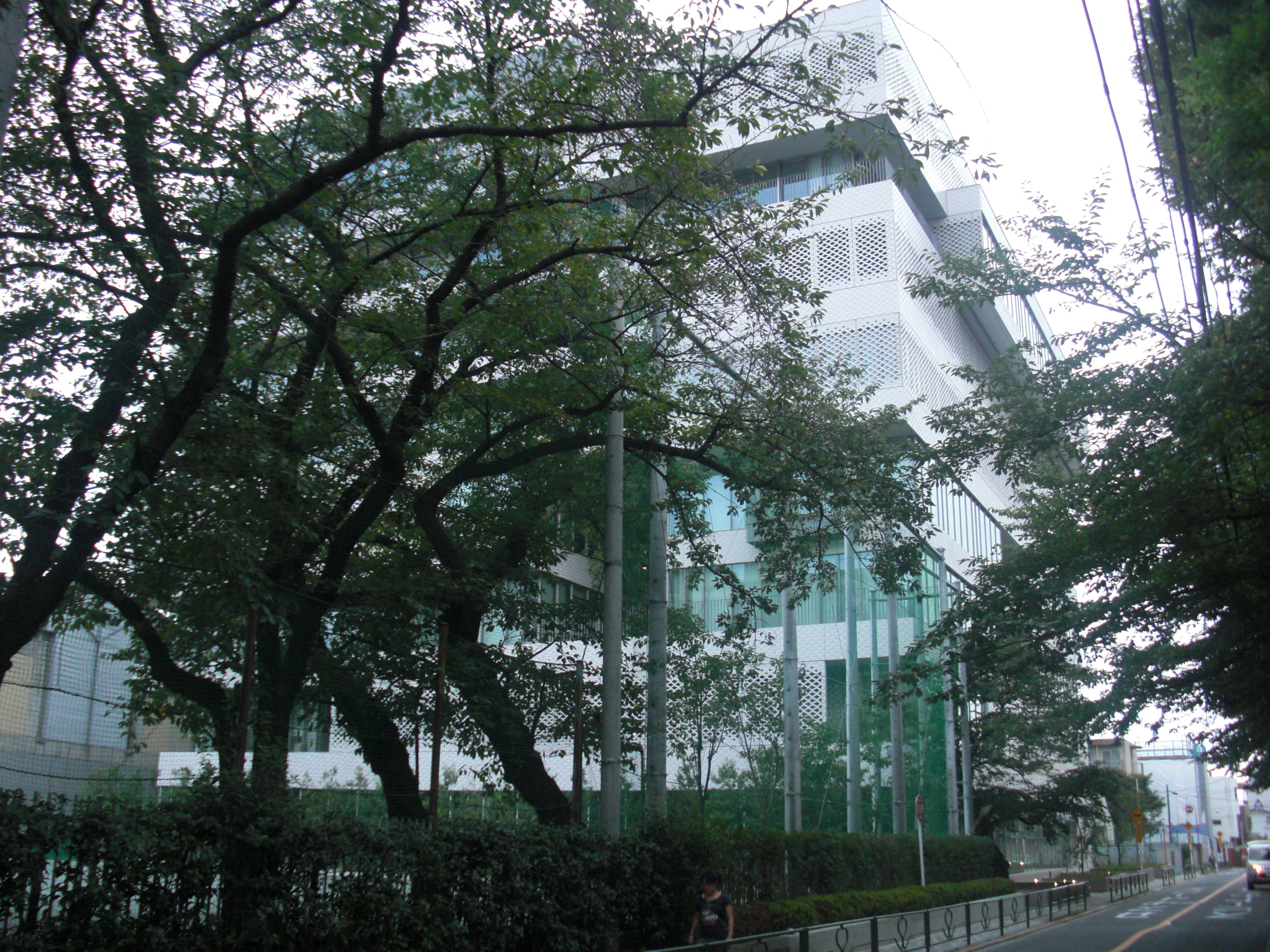
Bunkyo Campus (Bunkyo, Tokyo)

Atomi University (跡見学園女子大学, Atomi gakuen joshi daigaku) is a private women's college in Niiza, Saitama, Japan, established in 1965. The predecessor of the school was founded in 1875.

== Atomi Junior College ==
Atomi Junior College (跡見学園女子大学短期大学部, Atomi Gakuen Joshi Daigaku Tanki Daigakubu) was a private junior college in Bunkyo Ward, in Tokyo, Japan. It was founded in 1950 and closed in 2007. It teaches Japanese, English and life art.

== Alumni ==
- Kanoko Okamoto, a novelist
- Michiko Yamamoto, a novelist
- Kyōko Okazaki, a manga artist
