= Yasha (manga) =

Japanese manga and television series

- Cover of the first tankōbon volume of Yasha, featuring the main character Sei Arisue.

YASHA-夜叉-
- Manga
- Written by: Akimi Yoshida
- Published by: Shogakukan
- Magazine: Bessatsu Shōjo Comic; Flowers
- Original run: 11 December 1996 – 23 August 2002
- Volumes: 12
- Television drama
- Original network: TV Asahi
- Original run: 21 April 2000 – 30 June 2000
- Episodes: 11
- Manga

Eve no Nemuri
- Written by: Akimi Yoshida
- Published by: Shogakukan
- Magazine: Flowers
- Original run: 26 January 2004 – 20 December 2005
- Volumes: 5

Yasha (YASHA-夜叉-) is a Japanese shōjo manga series written and illustrated by Akimi Yoshida and published by Shogakukan. It has 12 volumes, the first published on 11 December 1996 and the last on 23 August 2002. It was adapted into a Japanese television drama series in 2000. A sequel manga series, Eve no Nemuri, has five volumes, the first published on 26 January 2004 and the last on 20 December 2005.

== Reception ==
It won the 47th Shogakukan Manga Award for shōjo manga. Eve no Nemuri was nominated for the 10th Tezuka Osamu Cultural Prize.
