= Wounded Angel =

Wounded Angel may refer to:

- Wounded Angel, a 2026 studio album by Elley Duhé
- The Wounded Angel, a 1903 painting by Finnish symbolist painter Hugo Simberg
- The Wounded Angel (film), a 2016 Kazakhstani drama film directed by Emir Baigazin
