= Lovers' Kiss =

- Film poster
- Directed by: Ataru Oikawa
- Screenplay by: Ataru Oikawa; Noriko Gotō
- Based on: Lovers' Kiss by Akimi Yoshida
- Starring: Aya Hirayama; Hiroki Narimiya; Mikako Ichikawa; Aoi Miyazaki; Yuma Ishigaki
- Cinematography: Motokichi Hasegawa
- Edited by: Hirohide Abe
- Music by: Akira Yamato
- Production company: Shogakukan Production
- Distributed by: Toho
- Release date: January 25, 2003 (Japan)
- Running time: 114 minutes
- Country: Japan
- Language: Japanese

Lovers' Kiss (Japanese: ラヴァーズ・キス) is a 2003 Japanese romance film directed by Ataru Oikawa based on a manga by Akimi Yoshida. This is a youth movie of six teenagers (three boys and three girls), taking place in Kamakura. The themes of homosexuality and sexual trauma are the main focus of the story.

== Plot ==
Rikako of the twelfth grade repeated play at night with her close Miki every day. One day she meets (and becomes infatuated with) Tomoaki Fujii, who's rumoured to be the Don Juan of her school and even impregnated a girl before getting an abortion in his father's hospital. This doesn't bother Rikako one bit, as she too sleeps around. But Tomoaki, knowing Rikako's true intentions, shoves her aside. Rikako later finds out that Tomoaki is quitting school to move to Okinawa, and she finally attempts to understand him. From then on, they form a close bond.

== Characters ==
- Rikako Kawana (Aya Hirayama) :"The cold hand" in the story. Due to a childhood trauma involving molestation from a teacher, she became cold and detached from reality, confusing feelings of sex, fear, and love as all the same. Her meeting with Tomoaki plays a huge part in what untangles her emotionally.
- Tomoaki Fujii (Hiroki Narimiya): Rumoured to be the "Don Juan" of the school, and further rumours involve a girl impregnated by him having an abortion in his father's hospital. However, contrary to popular belief, his world is not so enviable as it seems.
- Miki Ozaki (Mikako Ichikawa)：Rikako's best friend and classmate. She fell in love with Rikako at first sight, when Rikako played a piano piece.
- Eriko Kawana (Aoi Miyazaki)：Rikako's younger sister. She's in love with Miki, and therefore is jealous of Rikako. Ogata's classmate.
- Takao Sagisawa (Yuma Ishigaki)：He's in love with Tomoaki, and also knows of the pain Tomoaki's hiding.
- Atsushi Ogata (Shinnosuke Abe)：He fell in love with Takao at first sight by the exercise of the land meeting.
- Misako Fujii (Naomi Nishida)：Tomoaki's aunt
- Junko Fujii (Chikako Aoyama)：Tomoaki's mother, and part of his pain.
