= Pink (1989 manga) =

Japanese short story manga by Kyoko Okazaki

- Re-released cover of Pink featuring Yumiko

ピンク (Pinku)
- Genre: Romance
- Manga
- Written by: Kyoko Okazaki
- Published by: Magazine House
- English publisher: NA: Vertical Inc
- Imprint: Mag Comics
- Magazine: New Punch Zaurus
- Published: September 1989
- Volumes: 1

Pink (Japanese: ピンク, Hepburn: Pinku) is a 1989 Japanese manga by Kyoko Okazaki. Originally published by Magazine House, the manga follows the life of Yumiko, who works as both a call girl and an office lady. The story explores her relationships and how they are shaped by the social and economic climate of Tokyo in the 1980s. Pink is considered to be one of the first josei manga, a subset of manga aimed at adult women.

Pink was developed and published at the height of the Japanese asset price bubble, a period characterized by heavy consumerism and unchecked optimism. This sudden boom in the economy fueled a surge in disposable income, leading to a desire for luxury goods. Set against a backdrop of materialism, Pink explores themes of youthful rebellion, and critiques the excessive pursuit of extravagance.

Pink was well received by both critics and audiences alike for its social commentary and realistic portrayal of Tokyo in the 1980s. Considered Okazaki's breakthrough work, Pink significantly influenced both josei and shojo (targeted towards teenage girls) manga genres. Pink was re-released in Japan on July 29, 2010, with a new cover. An English translation published by Vertical Inc was released on November 15, 2013.

== Synopsis ==
The story starts with Yumiko working at a love hotel. Afterwards Keiko, Yumiko's stepsister, reveals that her mother is having an affair with a younger man named Haruo. Through a chance encounter, Yumiko develops feelings for Haruo herself and learns of his struggles as a novelist. Despite their unconventional dynamic, their bond strengthens. Eventually, due to a flooding at her apartment, Yumiko moves in with Haruo.

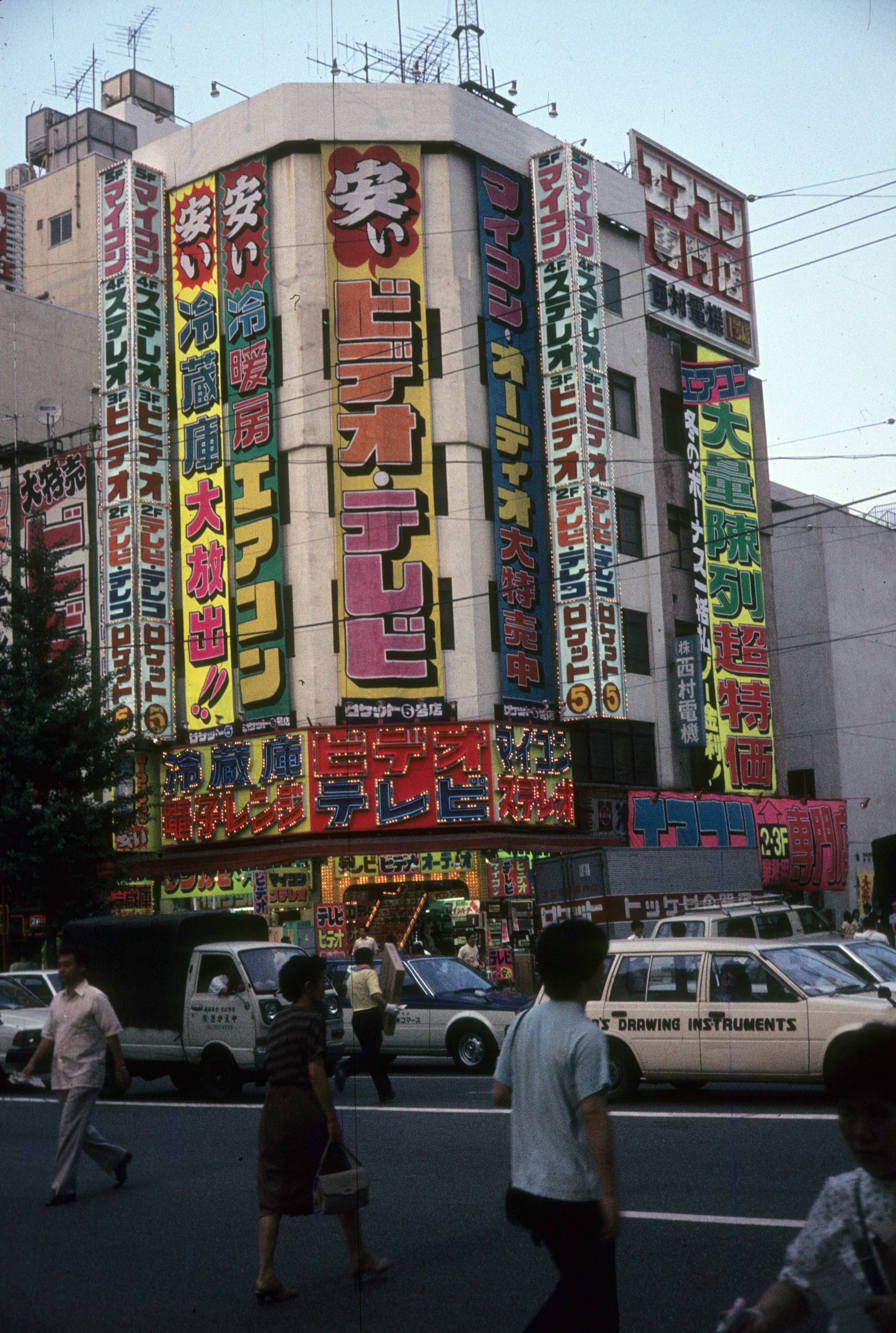
Tokyo in the 1980s, the main setting of Pink

Together, Yumiko, Haruo, Keiko, and Yumiko's pet crocodile Croc slowly start to resemble a family. Haruo overcomes his writer's block by cutting and pasting passages from other stories to create his own novel. Their newfound life together takes a turn when Yumiko's stepmother, enraged by their relationship, steals Croc and turns him into a leather suitcase. This plunges Yumiko into a deep depression. Meanwhile, Haruo wins a writing competition for his novel. He plans to use the money from the competition to move with Yumiko to a tropical island.

Before they can leave, Haruo is involved in a fatal car accident while returning home from an interview. The story concludes with an image of the Yumiko forever marked by the loss of her lover and pet, waiting in vain for the fulfillment of her dream life.

== Characters ==
Yumiko (ゆみこ, Yumiko)
A twenty-two year old office lady, nicknamed Yumi (ユミ, Yumi) who moonlights as a call girl in order to buy food for her pet crocodile. Due to her strained relationship with her stepmother, she lives in an apartment alone. She harbors romantic feelings for Haruo.
Haruo Yoshino (よしの はるお, Yoshino Haruo)
Yumiko's love interest. Haruo is a struggling novelist and sugar baby of Yumiko's step-mother. Haruo reciprocates Yumiko's romantic feelings and the two end up living together.
Yumiko's step-mother (ゆみこ の けいぼ, Yumiko no keibo)
Yumiko's unnamed stepmother. She has a strained relationship with Yumiko due to Yumiko's belief that she married her father for his money. Conceited and vain, she started a relationship with Haruo in order to be feed into her desires.
Keiko (ケイコ, Keiko)
Yumiko's step-sister. She is frequently with Yumiko despite her mothers disapproval.
Croc (ワニ, Wani)
Yumiko's pet crocodile. Croc is domesticated and docile but is characterized by its voracious hunger.

== Bibliography ==
- Langsdale, Samantha; Coody, Elizabeth Rae (2020-04-20). Monstrous Women in Comics. Jackson: Univ. Press of Mississippi. ISBN 978-1-4968-2766-1.
