= Hiroko Utsumi =

Japanese anime director & animator

- 内海紘子
- Occupations: Director, animator
- Known for: Free! Banana Fish; SK8 the Infinity

Hiroko Utsumi (内海紘子, Utsumi Hiroko) is a Japanese anime director, animator, storyboard artist, and manga artist. She is best known for her work with Kyoto Animation, particularly as the original director of Free!. After leaving Kyoto Animation's affiliate company Animation Do, she directed the anime adaptation of Banana Fish manga, and created and directed SK8 the Infinity with Bones. She is a graduate of the Osaka Municipal College of Design.

== Works ==
=== Television animation ===
- Full Metal Panic! The Second Raid (2005), animator
- The Melancholy of Haruhi Suzumiya (2006), animator
- Kanon (2006–2007), animator
- Lucky Star (2007), animator
- Clannad (2007–2008), animator
- Clannad After Story (2008–2009), animator
- The Melancholy of Haruhi Suzumiya (2009), assistant director and animator
- K-On! (2009), animator
- K-On!! (2010), storyboard artist, episode director, animator
- Nichijou (My Ordinary Life) (2011), storyboard artist, episode director, animator
- Hyouka (2012), storyboard artist, episode director and animator
- Love, Chunibyo & Other Delusions (2012), storyboard artist and episode director
- Tamako Market (2013), storyboard artist and animator
- Beyond the Boundary (2013–2014), storyboard artist and episode director
- Free! (2013), series director, storyboard artist, episode director, unit director
- Love, Chunibyo & Other Delusions -Heart Throb- (2014), storyboard artist
- Free! Eternal Summer (2014), series director, storyboard artist, episode director
- Days (2016), storyboard artist and unit director for closing animation
- Bungo Stray Dogs (2016), storyboard artist
- My Hero Academia (2017), storyboard artist and unit director for second season closing animation
- Altair: A Record of Battles (2017), storyboard artist
- Banana Fish (2018), series director, storyboard artist, episode director
- Dororo (2019), storyboard artist
- SK8 the Infinity (2021–present), series director, original creator, storyboard artist, episode director
- Hell's Paradise: Jigokuraku Teaser PV (2021), key animator
- Bucchigiri?! (2024), series director, original creator

=== Original video animation ===
- Lucky Star OVA (2008), animator
- K-On! (2010), unit director and animator
- SK8 the Infinity Extra Part (2025), director

=== Film animation ===
- Munto (2009), animator
- The Disappearance of Haruhi Suzumiya (2010), animator and unit director
- K-On!: The Movie (2011), animator and unit director
- Tamako Love Story (2014), production committee
- Yu-Gi-Oh!: The Dark Side of Dimensions (2016), animation director and animator

=== Manga ===
- Super Carve! (2016–present), serialized in Animedia

=== Short animation ===
- Star (2011), animator
- Swimsuit (2013), storyboard artist
