= Akimi Yoshida =

Japanese manga artist

Akimi Yoshida 吉田 秋生
- Born: August 12, 1956 (age 70) Shibuya, Tokyo, Japan
- Area: Manga artist
- Notable works: Banana Fish; Umimachi Diary
- Awards: See below

Akimi Yoshida (吉田 秋生, Yoshida Akimi; born August 12, 1956) is a Japanese manga artist.

== Career ==
She is a graduate of Musashino Art University. She made her professional debut in 1977 with the short story Chotto Fushigi na Geshukunin (ちょっと不思議な下宿人; "A Slightly Strange Neighbor"), published in Bessatsu Shōjo Comic magazine. Her following series were critical successes. Her series Sakura no Sono was adapted as a live-action film in 1992.

Yoshida is best known for the crime thriller series Banana Fish, which she published between 1985 and 1994. The series was reprinted many times and received an anime adaptation produced by MAPPA in 2018.

== Style ==
While publishing mainly in shōjo manga magazines, her drawing style has often been compared to the aesthetics of shōnen manga. Yoshida herself reacted to this in an interview with a magazine in 1982: "Being a secret shojo manga artist suits me just fine. Hidden in some little corner of the world, staying out of people's way, I can actually do some pretty outrageous things. Which is really great. [...] So, yeah, you men can just shut up. Girls, let's just have our own fun right here."

== Reception ==
She is a three time recipient of the Shogakukan Manga Award – for Kisshō Tennyo in 1983 and for Yasha in 2001, both in the shōjo manga category, and for Umimachi Diary in 2015 in the general manga category. In 2002, Yasha was among the jury-selected works at the Japan Media Arts Festival 2002. In 2007, she received an Excellence Award for manga at the 11th Japan Media Arts Festival for Umimachi Diary, which was later adapted into a feature film titled Our Little Sister. In 2013, she was awarded the 6th Manga Taishō, again for Umimachi Diary.

Despite her work being solely published in shōjo manga magazines, she also has a broad readership among fans of shōnen manga.

=== Awards ===
List of Akimi Yoshida's awards and nominations
Year	Award	Category	Nominated work	Result	Notes	Ref.
1983	29th Shogakukan Manga Award	Shōjo	Kisshō Tennyo and Kawa yori mo Nagaku Yuruyaka ni	Won	Results announced in early 1984	
2001	47th Shogakukan Manga Award	Shōjo	Yasha	Won	Results announced in early 2002	
2002	6th Japan Media Arts Festival Awards, Manga Division	Jury Selections	Yasha	Longlisted	Recommended by the jury	
2006	10th Tezuka Osamu Cultural Prize	Grand Prize	Eve no Nemuri	Nominated	Came in seventh place in the initial vote	
2007	11th Japan Media Arts Festival Awards, Manga Division	Excellence Award	Umimachi Diary	Won		
2008	1st Manga Taishō	—	Umimachi Diary	Nominated	Came in third place with 42 points	
2008	12th Tezuka Osamu Cultural Prize	Grand Prize	Umimachi Diary	Nominated	Came in second place in the initial vote	
2009	13th Tezuka Osamu Cultural Prize	Grand Prize	Umimachi Diary	Nominated	Tied for first place in the initial vote	
2011	15th Tezuka Osamu Cultural Prize	Grand Prize	Umimachi Diary	Nomination declined	Tied for first place in the initial vote; Yoshida declined the nomination	
2013	6th Manga Taishō	—	Umimachi Diary	Won		
2015	61st Shogakukan Manga Award	General	Umimachi Diary	Won	Results announced in January 2016	
2019	23rd Tezuka Osamu Cultural Prize	Grand Prize	Umimachi Diary	Nominated	Came in second place in the initial vote	

== Works ==
=== Series ===
Title	Year	Notes	Refs
California Story (カリフォルニア物語, California Monogatari)	1978–1981	Serialized in Bessatsu Shōjo Comic; Published by Shogakukan in 8 vol.	
Kawa yori mo Nagaku Yuruyaka ni (河よりも長くゆるやかに)	1983–1985	Serialized in Petit Flower; Published by Shogakukan in 2 vol.	
Kisshō Tennyo (吉祥天女)	1983–1984	Serialized in Bessatsu Shōjo Comic; Published by Shogakukan in 4 vol.	
Sakura no Sono (櫻の園)	1985–1986	Serialized in LaLa; Published by Hakusensha in 1 vol.	
Banana Fish (バナナフィッシュ)	1985–1994	Serialized in Bessatsu Shōjo Comic; Published by Shogakukan in 19 vol.	
Hanako Gekki (ハナコ月記)	1988–1994	Published in 1 vol.	
Lovers' Kiss (ラヴァーズ・キス)	1995–1996	Serialized in Bessatsu Shōjo Comic; Published by Shogakukan in 2 vol.	
Yasha (YASHA―夜叉―)	1996–2002	Serialized in Bessatsu Shōjo Comic and Flowers; Published by Shogakukan in 12 vol.	
Eve no Nemuri (イヴの眠り)	2003–2005	Serialized in Flowers; Published by Shogakukan in 5 vol.	
Umimachi Diary (海街diary)	2006–2018	Serialized in Flowers; Published by Shogakukan in 9 vol.	
Utagawa Hyakkei (詩歌川百景)	2019–present	Serialized in Flowers; Published by Shogakukan in 4 vol. (as of December 2025)	

=== Short story collections ===
- Yumemiru Koro o Sugite mo (夢みる頃をすぎても), 1983

=== Anime ===
- Bobby's Girl (ボビーに首ったけ), 1985, character designer

=== Art books ===
- California Tuning, 1982
- The Making of Bobby's Girl, 1985
- Angel Eyes: Illustration Book Banana Fish, 1994 (1st ed.), 2018 (reprint)
- Double Helix: Illustration Book Yasha, 2003

== Literature ==
- Spies, Alwyn (2003). Studying Shojo Manga. Global Education, Narratives of the Self and Pathologization of the Feminine. University of British Columbia.
