= Osaka Performance Doll =

Japanese idol group

Osaka Performance Doll a.k.a. O.P.D. (大阪パフォーマンスドール) was a female japanese idol Jpop band from 1993 to 1997, theatre-based in Osaka, with five main members (called "F/Unit" with their initials) and several others for live performances and trainees.

OPD was the sister-band of Tokyo Performance Doll (TPD), inspired by Jpop band Onyanko Club, like Morning Musume and the Hello! Project or AKB48 more recently. Among main members are future Hello! Project singer Atsuko Inaba and actresses Kumiko Nakano and Yukiko Takeuchi, the last one also performing in 1995 in the band "West End X Yuki", brother band of "East End X Yuri" with fellow TPD member Yuri Ichii. Two members including Inaba left OPD in 1996 and were replaced. The group disbanded in 1997, and made a reunion in 2008 for two shows and one compilation album.

== Members ==
F/Unit (first members)

- Atsuko Inaba (稲葉貴子), resigned March 1996
- Ayano Furutani (古谷文乃), resigned March 1996
- Yukiko Takeuchi (武内由紀子)
- Miho Ueda (上田美穂, alias "Yozora")
- Kumiko Nakano (中野公美子)

second members

- Naomi Shigemoto (重元直美) (March 1996)
- Aki Nakamura (中村亜紀) (March 1996)

Live performance members

- Muraoka Mika (村岡美香), resigned March 1994
- Suzuki Rika (鈴木里佳), resigned November 1994
- Nishimura Naomi (西村奈保美), resigned December 1994
- Matsumoto Junko (松本淳子), resigned May 1995
- Kajimoto Ai (梶本愛)
- Sakata Akiko (坂田朗子)
- Takeshita Eri (竹下恵理)
- Nishimoto Yasue (西元康恵)
- Yamano Kae (山野香恵)
- Mizuno Yukari (水野由加里)
- Mori Hiroko (森宏子), resigned November 1994
- Kawamoto Natsuko (河本奈津子)
- Oyama Rumi (大山ルミ)
- Oyama Erino (大山恵理乃)
- Matsumoto Miyuki (松本美由紀)
- Minamida Chizuru (南田千鶴)
- Miyauchi Junko (宮内潤子)
- Morita Yuko (森田有子)
- Yamamoto Yoshiko (山本美子)
- Yamada Mari (山田真里)

== Discography ==
Singles

- 1993.11.01 : Mangetsu no Yoru Dakara / Umareta Machi no Fence wo Koete (満月の夜だから / 生まれた街のフェンスを越えて)
- 1994.03.21 : Koi ga Mabushikute (恋がまぶしくて)
- 1994.06.22 : Cherry Parade (チェリー・パレード)
- 1994.11.02 : Lady Boy (レディボーイ)
- 1995.02.01 : Egao ni Dai Sekkin (笑顔に大接近)
- 1995.07.21 : Shiny Days
- 1996.02.21 : Suteki ni Naritai (素敵になりたい)
- 1996.06.01 : Nakitai (泣きたいッ)

Albums

- 1994.07.01 : d-Culture
- 1995.08.21 : NONG!
- 1996.07.21 : Magnet (マグネット)

Compilation

- 2009.01.11 : OPD ALL SONGS COLLECTION
