= Inaoka =

Inaoka (written: 稲岡) is a Japanese surname. Notable people with the surname include:

- Ariko Inaoka (born 1975), Japanese photographer
- Michiyo Inaoka (稲岡 美千代, born 1950), Japanese high jumper
