= List of Ultimate Otaku Teacher episodes =

Ultimate Otaku Teacher is an anime series adapted from the manga of the same title by Takeshi Azuma. Masato Sato directed the series with scripts written by Atsushi Maekawa at A-1 Pictures. Isao Sugimoto designed the characters and Ryuuichi Takada composed the music. The series aired from April 4 to September 26, 2015. From episodes 1 to 12, the first opening theme is "Youthful Dreamer" by TrySail, and the ending theme is "DREAMIN'" by Tokyo Performance Doll. From episodes 13 to 24, the second opening theme is "Vivid Brilliant door" by Sphere, and the ending theme is "MY ONLY ONE" by 9nine. Funimation has licensed the series in North America.

== Episode list ==
No.	Title (Note: All English titles are taken from Funimation.)	Original air date	English air date
1	"I'm a High School Teacher Now"; Transliteration: "Kōkō kyōshi hajimemashita" (Japanese: 高校教師始めました)	April 4, 2015	May 30, 2015
Famous scientist, Junichiro Kagami, claims he cannot get a job as he has YD, an illness where he can only focus on what he "Yearns to Do", meaning he spends all day obsessively writing on his blog about anime and manga. His sister Suzune Kagami forces him to become a part time teacher at Higashi Shinmei High School. Junichiro meets student Minako Kano who is being bullied by Miho Kito and her former friends. Junichiro has the class play a computer game and observes how they play to learn about their personalities. While talking to Minako about her bullies he reveals he became famous after he designed a theoretical Anywhere Door in high school that cannot be built until the 22nd century. Junichiro later saves Minako from a molester after Miho puts her personal information on the schools underground website. The bullying gets worse as Miho tricks Minako into drinking juice mixed with chalk dust. To teach the bullies a lesson Junichiro convinces them he has published all their information on the underground website when in reality he was just trolling them from a fake website. Junichiro is being watched by someone from the shadows.
2	"Laws of Society"; Transliteration: "Shakai no rūru" (Japanese: 社会のルール)	April 11, 2015	June 6, 2015
Junichiro finds that his anime blog has dropped in popularity and becomes depressed. Someone is still watching him from the shadows. Whilst shopping Junichiro stops a shoplifter but is mistaken for a molester and ends up fleeing with the shoplifter who turns out to be Yukino. Junichiro gives her his copy of the game she tried to steal. At school Minako gives Junichiro a bento as thanks. Junichiro learns the entire school is now playing the game he made his class play but many are frustrated they must pay for game items. Footage of Junichiro as a molester spreads through the internet and Junichiro, seeing an opportunity to return to unemployment, admits to being a molester and is fired. Yukino later admits the whole thing is her fault. Before leaving Junichiro gives the students a gift, a free fully customisable weapon for the game. Junichiro is confronted by Koyomi Hiiragi, Chairperson of Hiiragi Academy, who offers him a new job.
3	"Chase in Akihabara"; Transliteration: "Cheisu de Akihabara" (Japanese: チェイス in 秋葉原)	April 18, 2015	June 13, 2015
Koyomi thinks Japan has become boring and wishes Junichiro to make Japan more amusing with his unusual teaching methods. However, the next morning Junichiro disappears. Koyomi uses her considerable wealth to track Junichiro to Otaku shopping district Akihabara. Junichiro claims he has no intention of accepting the job offer. Using his considerable hacking skills and knowledge of the district Junichiro evades all Koyomi's high tech attempts to track him, but he is eventually captured by his sister, who knows his shopping habits, at an autograph signing event. Junichiro is taken to Hiiragi Academy, where student council president Makina Momozono attempts to expel student Kiriko Shikishima for having a part time job at a maid café. As Makina has no respect for maid cafes Junichiro suddenly accepts the job as a new teacher and swears to educate Makina on "Maid Dignity."
4	"Dignity of Maids"; Transliteration: "Meido no hinkaku" (Japanese: メイドの品格)	April 25, 2015	June 20, 2015
Junichiro drags everybody to the Heart on Heart maid café where Kiriko works for Minami Kitiyama, Junichiro's friend high school friend. His sister is immediately incensed to learn he is the cafe's sole Platinum VIP customer, having visited the café over 50 times in a month. Junichiro challenges Makina to work as a maid for the day. Makina does gain a better respect for how difficult being a maid is but still insists Kiriko be expelled for breaking school rules. Junichiro reveals that Kiriko is actually an incredibly popular underground singing idol known for her maid outfits and sharp dance moves that earned her the name "Maid among Maids Razor Girl." After Junichiro arranges for Kiriko to be seen singing by over 10 million people online Makina allows Kiriko to stay at school as expelling her now would look bad for the academy. Koyomi confirms that hiring Junichiro was a good idea.
5	"Monster of Icho Academy"; Transliteration: "Gin'nan gakuen no kaibutsu" (Japanese: 銀杏学園の怪物)	May 2, 2015	June 27, 2015
On his first day at Hiiragi Academy Junichiro meets the incredibly strong school delinquent Seijuro Nanami. With the interference of Chairperson Koyomi Junichiro ends up challenging Seijuro to a "showdown". Minako turns out to be a childhood friend of Seijuro's, whose father was a disgraced baseball player which lead to Seijuro being kicked off his middle school baseball team. Junichiro challenges Seijuro to a game of soccer with the loser being declared the winners slave for life and also if Seijuro loses embarrassing photos of Minako will be released online. To prevent this Minako ends up helping Seijuro practice for the showdown for three days by playing a soccer video game. It is also revealed Koyomi paid off Seijuro's fathers debts in return for Seijuro attending the academy.
6	"An Amusing View"; Transliteration: "Omoshiroi keshiki" (Japanese: おもしろい景色)	May 9, 2015	July 4, 2015
On the day of the game Junichiro and Seijuro team up with the boys and girls soccer teams for the match. At first Seijuro focuses more on hitting Junichiro than playing the game and is soon losing by several goals and ends up quitting. Junichiro goads Seijuro into returning for the second half of the match. Using a method from his video game training that is only possible using Seijuro's strength he scores several goals and wins the match. Seijuro realizes Junichiro had manipulated him into playing so he would become popular and be invited to join the boys soccer team. Seijuro admits Junichiro beat him fair and square. Following a misunderstanding Minako ends up putting Seijuro in a choke hold. Koyomi reaffirms her belief that hiring Junichiro was a good idea.
7	"A Beautiful Girl's Secret"; Transliteration: "Bishōjo no himitsu" (Japanese: 美少女のヒミツ)	May 16, 2015	July 18, 2015
Junichiro's sister Suzune asks him to tutor her friend Kanan Chinami who, due to her voice sounding like an anime character, only communicates by text. Kanan's parents are refusing to let her see her favorite singer in concert until she improves her physics test scores. Junichiro attempts several methods of forcing her to talk with her anime voice before designing a computer game just for Kanan to help her learn physics. Kanan plays the game constantly and reveals she was bullied for how her voice sounds and stopped talking. Junichiro helps her accept herself for how she is. Right before Kanan sits her physics exam she whispers Junichiro's favorite anime catchphrase to him, though he forgets to record her saying it.
8	"The Truant is a Grand Master"; Transliteration: "Futokō-ji wa dai sensei" (Japanese: 不登校児は大センセイ)	May 23, 2015	July 25, 2015
Part of Junichiro's teaching responsibility is to force several long term truants to return to school, but he is more interested in shopping for the latest issue of Classroom of the Terminus, one of his favorite manga's. Whilst shopping he meets Sachiko Tanaka who Junichiro realizes is secretly Kisaki Tenjoin, the author of Classroom of the Terminus, one of his truant students and a friend of Makina's. Sachiko refuses to attend school as it interferes with her job as a manga artist. Suddenly realizing she has a deadline for her next manga Junichiro and Suzune spend all night helping her finish. Junichiro reveals he is her class teacher and praises her for her dedication to manga. Makina, who misses her friend, insists Sachiko return to school. With help from Junichiro, Sachiko returns to school, planning on proving to Makina that school is not necessary to be a successful manga artist.
9	"The Girl in the Game"; Transliteration: "Gēmu no kuni no shōjo" (Japanese: ゲームの国の少女)	May 30, 2015	August 1, 2015
In the MMORPG Uroboros, Junichiro and his partner Luce have completed every quest except for one that requires a team of 35 members. Deciding to use his class to make up the missing players Junichiro has them play the game under the pretext of teaching them about the history of warfare. He and Luce train them how to play and they succeed in defeating a large group of monsters. However, they are still one player short of the required 35. Junichiro decides to force one of his other long term truants, Kotaro Araki, to return to class in time for the quest. However, at Kotaro's home Junichiro discovers that not only is Kotaro an antisocial cross-dresser who prefers to wear girls clothes, he is also Luce and so cannot be used to make up the extra player needed for the quest.
10	"The Melancholy of Koutaro"; Transliteration: "Kōtarō no yūutsu" (Japanese: 光太郎のユウウツ)	June 6, 2015	August 8, 2015
Kotaro is shocked that Junichiro cares more about the quest than about his cross-dressing. Junichiro hurriedly searches for someone else to join the team. In the game Kotaro as Luce trains his classmates and becomes closer to them but is still unwilling to reveal he is Kotaro. Junichiro convinces Makina to be the extra team member. The quest is a battle with another extremely powerful team of players. Kotaro logs in to allow them to take part in the quest but is too ashamed to actually play with them. Junichiro tries to convince him to play, meaning the class must fight without their strongest players. Kotaro tells Junichiro he has always preferred girls clothes but in middle school he was seen by bullies from his class who teased him so he ended up accidentally pushing one of them down some stairs. Kotaro is afraid his new classmates will reject him like he was in middle school so Junichiro shows him his classmates in the game counting on him to help them. They both log back in and help the class win the battle. Kotaro agrees to play the game again with them but is still afraid of being rejected by his new friends.
11	"The Outside World"; Transliteration: "Soto no sekai" (Japanese: 外の世界)	June 13, 2015	August 15, 2015
Kotaro has a nightmare about the bullies from middle school. As Luce he logs into the game to play with Junichiro who quickly logs out, leaving Luce alone. At school Junichiro teases Seijuro about how Luce humiliated him during the training for the game. In the game Luce is harassed by other players, unable to defend himself in the games safe zone without being punished by the Guards. He is suddenly rescued by Seijuro who defeats the bullies. Luce decides to trust him and reveals he is really Kotaro and is surprised when Seijuro doesn't treat him any differently. Sachiko was also secretly logged in and hears Kotaro's secret. Sachiko goes to Kotaro's house and takes him clothes shopping. Whilst shopping they are harassed by delinquents but are saved by Makina who immediately recognizes Kotaro. Makina brings Kotaro and Sachiko to her home where they meet Makina's little brother, Kazuya. Elsewhere Junichiro is planning something.
12	"Luce vs The First"; Transliteration: "Rūche tai fāsuto" (Japanese: ルーチェvsファースト)	June 20, 2015	August 22, 2015
Junichiro arranges a party for the class to celebrate their victory in the game. Kotaro is persuaded to attend by Junichiro. At the party Kotaro introduces himself as Luce and is welcomed warmly by everybody who are still unaware he is Kotaro. Junichiro reveals he has invited the bullies from Kotaro's middle school. Kotaro hurriedly convinces the bullies to keep his secret, disappointing Junichiro. Instead Junichiro sets up a custom battle for the class, promising to reveal a secret about Luce if he wins. Luce joins the battle against Junichiro with the entire class helping him. Junichiro, determined to make Luce admit he is Kotaro, defeats the entire class before facing Luce. Luce ends up defeating Junichiro before admitting he is Kotaro and is immediately accepted by everyone in his class. He introduces himself to Junichiro by his real name for the very first time.
13	"The Doctor from Geneva"; Transliteration: "Junēbu kara kita hakase" (Japanese: ジュネーブから来た博士)	June 27, 2015	August 29, 2015
A woman called Tim Bernards Lynn turns up at Junichiro's house and reveals she is the head scientist at CERM Particle Physics Laboratory. After Junichiro published his paper on the Anywhere Door it was her job to disprove his theory, but Junichiro's hypothesis proved to be correct. She attempted to hire him to work at CERM but Junichiro turned her down as he had already become obsessed with Manga. Miss Lynn is determined to make Junichiro come work at CERM and is shocked to learn Junichiro is a teacher. Miss Lynn spends her time trying to bribe him with limited edition merchandise to work for her, which his students are not happy about. Miss Lynn finally challenges Junichiro to solve one of the problems associated with the Anywhere Door. If he does, she will leave, if he fails he has to go to CERM. Junichiro begins work only to suddenly rush away to meet Koyomi who reveals that she had made her own agreement with Miss Lynn. If Junichiro chose to help a student in need rather than solve the problem he gets to stay at the academy. Miss Lynn flies back to CERM. It is shown Junichiro managed to finish the equation in a few hours when it should have taken him a week.
14	"The Assessment Girl"; Transliteration: "Satei no on'na" (Japanese: サテイの女)	July 11, 2015	September 12, 2015
Student council treasurer Madoka Kuramachi has the ability to exactly determine the value of any object or person she meets. Junichiro buys a new computer game and almost buys a limited edition figurine until Madoka points out it is damaged and saves him a lot of money. In return she asks him on a date, which he declines. While saving her from delinquents Junichiro's new game is broken but Madoka instantly replaces it revealing her family owns the KMC company who made the game. Madoka is supposed to find and marry a man who will be a benefit to the company and she has chosen Junichiro. Madoka goes to Junichiro's house, announcing her intention to marry him, build the biggest video game company in the world and have 11 children. Suzune allows Madoka to stay, convinced she will see how useless Junichiro is and leave. Madoka fails to seduce Junichiro while he is taking a bath. Madoka's company is about to be taken over by Activision Frigate, a rival company, the reason Madoka is desperate to get married, as part of the takeover includes her being forced to marry the CEO. Junichiro becomes determined to save Madoka.
15	"The Fiancé is a Game King"; Transliteration: "Fianse wa gēmu-ō" (Japanese: フィアンセはゲーム王)	July 18, 2015	September 19, 2015
The CEO of Activision Frigate is teenager Hell Gates, an arrogant computer game world champion, who thinks of Madoka as a prize to be won. Junichiro declares himself Madoka's fiancé and challenges Hell Gates to a duel. If Junichiro wins Hell Gates will stop his takeover of KMC. If Hell Gates wins Junichiro will never play any computer game ever again. The duel is to be on Kings Halo 3 a game made by Hell Gates Company not yet on sale. Junichiro quickly wins by taking advantage of all the software glitches he knew would be in a game not yet available to the public. Hell Gates challenges him to a rematch on Kings Halo 2 without glitches. Junichiro proves to be vastly more skilled than Hell Gates who admits defeat and ceases his takeover of Madoka's company while also confessing his real feelings to her. Madoka tells Junichiro she fell in love with him because he was the only person whose value she could not calculate and therefore concluded him to be . . . priceless. She leaves after declaring she will find some way of marrying him in the future.
16	"Take Me to the Afterlife"; Transliteration: "Jōbutsu shitai no" (Japanese: 成仏したいの)	July 25, 2015	September 26, 2015
Junichiro and his class are asked by Koyomi to spend an entire night cleaning the schools boarding house which has been closed for a year. Junichiro accepts after learning the boarding house has a library filled with manga. The students find their cleaning attempts being sabotaged by a ghostly presence. Junichiro, who had fallen asleep, is awoken by the ghost of a student who is happy Junichiro can see her. The ghost begs Junichiro to help her cross into the afterlife. The ghost is a fan of Kisaki Tenjoin so Junichiro introduces her to Sachiko. The ghost wishes to know how Sachiko's very first manga ended as it was cancelled before Sachiko wrote the ending. Sachiko gives her the unpublished manuscript to read. Finally happy the ghost seems about to cross over but fails. Some investigating reveals the ghost had been obsessed with writing her own manga so Sachiko teaches her how to draw but is suddenly overcome when the ghost inadvertently starts draining her life force. She hurriedly draws a single page which Junichiro claims is fantastic and the happy ghost finally crosses over. Koyomi reveals the ghost was called Matome Nishikujo and had been her classmate when she died.
17	"Turmoil on Day One"; Transliteration: "Hatsu tōkō de ōsawagi" (Japanese: 初登校で大騒ぎ)	August 1, 2015	October 3, 2015
Kotaro is convinced to return to school but shows up wearing a girls uniform. Makina claims a boy wearing a girls uniform is against the rules but Koyomi allows Kotaro to wear it. Kotaro become very popular among the boys who think he is cute. Kanan, who had previously been the cutest student in the school becomes jealous and tries to reclaim the boys attention but fails. Kotaro tells her he thinks she is cute and asks her to teach him how to be even cuter. They go shopping where Kotaro expresses a wish to take a job as a shrine maiden but cannot as part time jobs are against school rules but Makina is convinced to let them do it for one day. All three of them end up working as shrine maidens with Kotaro being popular with the male customers. Makina sees Junichiro and Suzune visiting the shrine. Junichiro fails to recognizes Makina after she takes her hair out of its normal twin pigtails. At school Junichiro casually mentions seeing a shrine maiden he thought was cute, which embarrasses Makina. While playing an arcade game together Kotaro says the real reason he came to school was to meet Junichiro.
18	"A Gamer's Pride"; Transliteration: "Gēmā no puraido" (Japanese: ゲーマーのプライド)	August 8, 2015	October 10, 2015
Junichiro earns a super rare playing card which is confiscated by Makina. Makina's brother, Kazuya, who also plays the same game and is always losing against another boy in his class, steals the rare card from Makina. Junichiro is approached by his student Joe Odawara who wants to confess his love to Makina but cannot as he gets nosebleeds around girls. Junichiro tries to teach him how to talk to girls with Kotaro pretending to be Makina so Joe can practice. Kazuya takes the card to school but as he is less skilled than his opponent he loses the card. Makina asks Junichiro to help Kazuya. Joe makes a clumsy attempt to confess to Makina but is immediately rejected. Junichiro trains Kazuya to play the game properly to win the card back fairly. Meanwhile Joe, having been rejected by Makina is now in love with Kotaro.
19	"Street Girl"; Transliteration: "Sutorītogāru" (Japanese: ストリートガール)	August 15, 2015	October 17, 2015
Makina and Junichiro patrol the streets to protect their students from gangs. They meet Taki Komiya, a young girl who refuses to go to school. Junichiro gets rid of Makina so he can talk to Taki alone. They end up fleeing from a street gang and Taki protects Junichiro from a mugger. Taki reveals she is leader of her own gang who are all children who don't fit in at school. The mugger attacks Taki from behind but is beaten by Minako, who is the previous leader of the gang. Junichiro receives tickets to a concert starring teen idol Komi-Ryu. At the concert Junichiro receives a phone call from Nagare Komiya who is actually Komi-Ryu and Taki's twin sister. She asks for his help to get Taki to leave the gang. Taki refuses to leave the gang. Junichiro praises her for staying true to herself and also joins the gang, establishing their headquarters in an abandoned building. Nagare disappears from a live TV interview and goes to Junichiro's house where she says she will quit her job as an idol unless he gets her sister out of the gang immediately.
20	"The Twin Idol"; Transliteration: "Futago no aidoru" (Japanese: 双子のアイドル)	August 29, 2015	October 31, 2015
With help from his class Junichiro organises a live internet broadcast for Nagare. She begins the broadcast with a song she and Taki both love. Taki watches the live broadcast from the gang headquarters. Nagare tells Junichiro the reason she wants Taki out of the gang. On the day of her first audition Nagare got sick and Taki ended up doing the audition for her and got her the job. Even though the interviewer realised she wasn't Nagare he gave her the job as an idol and Taki joined the gang instead. Junichiro has Nagare impersonate Taki at an amateur singing competition. Nagare is insulted by one of Taki's rivals and is motivated to sing the song again, gaining a perfect score and defending Taki's title. Nagare thanks Junichiro for his help and leaves to get changed but is attacked in the changing room.
21	"Here come the Family Rangers"; Transliteration: "Famirinjā kenzan" (Japanese: ファミリンジャー見参)	September 5, 2015	November 7, 2015
Nagare has been mistaken for Taki and kidnapped by the mugger and his gang. Junichiro spreads the story about Nagare's kidnapping on the internet and uses her fans to track her all over the city. The kidnappers intend to use Nagare to draw in Taki's gang, however Taki goes alone. Capturing Taki the mugger plans to film them being molested by his gang and upload it to the internet. However Seijuro and Minako beat up the gang while Junichiro and Taki go after the mugger who has Nagare. Junichiro reveals he has gathered hundreds of Nagare's fans outside the building and all he has to do is announce what the mugger and his gang almost did to Nagare and let her fans punish them instead. The gang flees but the mugger punches Taki in the face. Enraged, Nagare beats the mugger unconscious. Minako explains that Nagare is so protective of Taki that she was given the nickname "The Dragon" and that even Seijuro is afraid of her. Nagare joins the gang to be with her sister and they both decide to attend school with Junichiro as their teacher. Later, Makina catches Junichiro trying to recruit other students into the gang and punishes him severely.
22	"Castle Junichiro"; Transliteration: "Kagami-kun no oshiro" (Japanese: 鑑クンのお城)	September 12, 2015	November 14, 2015
Everyone at school notices Junichiro acting depressed. Despite his success as a teacher it is still not what he yearns to do. Tim Bernards Lynn announce on TV that they are ready to build Junichiro's Anywhere Door. At Heart on Heart café Junichiro meets his old school friend Yamato Toune who has been keeping tabs on him for KEC, a company developing an Anywhere Door in competition with CERM, who now wish to recruit Junichiro. Yamato takes him to the extremely high tech KEC laboratory which has been specifically built for Junichiro who is treated like a celebrity. Suddenly the on site Large Hadron Collider goes into meltdown almost costing them weeks of research data, but Junichiro steps in and completely restores the system in seconds. Elsewhere his sister and students are all worried he has gone missing. Despite the opportunity to finally build his Anywhere Door Junichiro can't work out why he is still depressed. Koyomi claims Junichiro is depressed because he no longer has any interest in building the Anywhere Door, with the implication being he yearns to do something else. Koyomi fires him from his job at the academy so he can figure out what he yearns to do.
23	"The Job Try Out Girl"; Transliteration: "Nazo no Ichinichi taiken nyūsho-sha" (Japanese: 謎の一日体験入所者)	September 19, 2015	November 21, 2015
Junichiro agrees to build the Anywhere Door despite being depressed. He is introduced to childlike intern Reiko Mukyo, who has never heard of Junichiro's Anywhere Door or manga. Junichiro demands she read the manga series that inspired him to design the Anywhere Door. She reads them in 2 hours and becomes obsessed with the door. She reveals she has a special ability to watch someone do something once and she becomes able to do it perfectly. Reiko uses the supercomputer and Large Hadron Collider to detect Higgs boson particles. Excited at being taught new things Reiko begins calling Junichiro "Excitement-Man." She demands more manga and takes Junichiro to the manga shop to learn to be an Otaku. Junichiro sends Reiko to her room who runs away crying just as CERM launches a cyber attack against the KEC supercomputer. Reiko knows she can help but doesn't know if she should since Junichiro sent her to her room. Junichiro struggles to stop the attack until Reiko appears and they work together to stop CERM. Junichiro happily praises Reiko for disobeying him, since just doing what other people tell her to is one of the main reasons she never has fun. Reiko declares Junichiro to be the most fun ever.
24	"My Educational Policies"; Transliteration: "Ore no kyōiku hōshin" (Japanese: オレの教育方針)	September 26, 2015	November 28, 2015
Makina demands Junichiro be fired but learns Koyomi has already fired him. Suzune, Kanan, Kotaro and Kiriko follow Koyomi but cannot find KEC's secret lab entrance. Reiko is having a tantrum about having to go to school and locks everyone outside the lab until they let her become a full time researcher. Junichiro manages to hack his way inside and tells Reiko he is siding with her because it is more amusing. Reiko realises she also has YD and the best place to find what she yearns to do is at school with other people. Having helped Reiko learn to have fun Junichiro realises he no longer yearns to build an Anywhere Door, and through flashbacks of helping his students, understands that what he now yearns to do is return to Hiiragi Academy, determined to help his students find what it is they also yearn to do. Koyomi, who had orchestrated everything in secret, hires him back as class teacher. Junichiro immediately writes an app designed to predict future exam questions allowing students to study the correct answers in advance. Every student in Japan begins scoring perfect marks on exams rendering schools totally obsolete. Junichiro announces that using his app any student can easily pass exams on subjects they find boring, devote less time to studying and more time to learning about what they yearn to do so that eventually all of Japan will have YD. Koyomi happily states that Japan is set to become very amusing in the future and that Junichiro Kagami really was the right man for the job.

== Home releases ==
=== Japanese ===
In Japan, Aniplex released the series in 8 volumes starting from August 26, 2015, to March 23, 2016.

Aniplex (Japan, Region 2 / A)
Volume	Episodes	Release date	Ref.
1	1–3	August 26, 2015	
2	4–6	September 30, 2015	
3	7–9	October 28, 2015	
4	10–12	November 25, 2015	
5	13–15	December 23, 2015	
6	16–18	January 27, 2016	
7	19–21	February 24, 2016	
8	22–24	March 23, 2016	

=== English ===
In North America, Funimation released the series in 2 parts with the first on November 15, 2016, and the second on February 21, 2017. In Australia and New Zealand it was released by Madman Entertainment in DVD in 2 parts with the first on August 2, 2017, and the second on May 24, 2017.

Funimation (Region 1/A — North America), Madman Entertainment (Region 4 — Australia and New Zealand)
Volume	Episodes	Release date		Ref.
Volume	Episodes	North America	Australasia	Ref.
1	1–12	November 15, 2016	August 2, 2017	
2	13–24	February 21, 2017	May 24, 2017	
