= Kaoruko =

- Pronunciation: [käo̞ɾɯᵝko̞]
- Gender: Female

Origin
- Origin: Japanese
- Meaning: Different meanings depending on the kanji used

Kaoruko (written: 薫子, 馨子, 香子, かおるこ in hiragana or カオルコ in katakana) is a feminine Japanese given name. Notable people with the name include:

- Princess Kaoruko (馨子内親王; 1029–1093), Japanese empress consort
- Kaoruko Himeno (姫野 カオルコ; born 1958), Japanese writer
- Kaoruko Wada (和田薫子; born 2009), Japanese figure skater

== Fictional characters ==
- Kaoruko Awata (泡田 薫子), a character in the manga/anime series My Hero Academia
- Kaoruko Hanayagi (花柳 香子), a character in the Revue Starlight franchise
- Kaoruko Moeta (萌田 薫子), a character in the manga series Comic Girls
- Kaoruko Waguri (和栗 薫子), a character in The Fragrant Flower Blooms with Dignity
