= Ichii =

Ichii (written: 市井) is a Japanese surname. Notable people with the surname include:

- Mai Ichii (市井 舞, born 1980), Japanese professional wrestler, mixed martial artist and kickboxer
- Sayaka Ichii (市井 紗耶香, born 1983), Japanese singer and idol
- Yuri Ichii (市井 由理, born 1972), Japanese rapper, singer and idol

== Fictional characters ==
- Tōru Ichii (一井 透), a character in the manga series A Channel
- Yui Ichii (櫟井 唯), a character in the manga series Yuyushiki
