= Ariko =

Ariko is a Japanese female given name. Notable people with the name include:

- Ariko Inaoka (稲岡 亜里子, born 1975), Japanese photographer
- Ariko Iso (磯 有理子, born 1970), Japanese football trainer
- Fujiwara no Ariko (藤原 有子, 1207 – 1286), was an Empress consort of Japan
