= Senso =

Senso may refer to:

- Senso (novel), Italian novella by Camillo Boito 1882
- Senso (film), 1954 Italian historical melodrama film by Luchino Visconti
- Senso (opera), Marco Tutino
- Senso (game), disc-shaped musical toy
- Senso (album) album by Australian singer-songwriter Stephen Cummings 1984
- Senso (grape), Cinsaut

== See also ==
- In ogni senso (In Every Sense) album by Eros Ramazzotti 1990
- Sensō-ji (金龍山浅草寺, Kinryū-zan Sensō-ji) Tokyo's oldest temple
- Sensō Sōshitsu (仙叟 宗室, 1622-1697) Japanese tea master
- Ahen senso (阿片戦爭 The Opium War) 1943 black-and-white Japanese film directed by Masahiro Makino
- Shojō Sensō (少女戦争 The Virgin War) 2011 Japanese film directed by Ataru Oikawa
- Mahō Sensō (魔法戦争 Magical Warfare) Japanese light novel series written by Hisashi Suzuki and illustrated by Lunalia
- Otome Sensō (Z女戦争, "Girl's War") single by the Japanese female idol group Momoiro Clover Z 2012
