= Einstein Girl =

- Theatrical release poster
- Directed by: Ataru Oikawa
- Written by: Ataru Oikawa
- Produced by: Naoya Narita
- Starring: Mayuko Iwasa; Megumi Komatsu; Rina Akiyama
- Cinematography: Ryu Segawa
- Edited by: Yusaku Takizawa
- Production companies: SoftBank BB Corp.; Panorama Communications
- Distributed by: Argo Pictures
- Release date: 16 July 2005 (Japan)
- Running time: 82 minutes
- Country: Japan
- Language: Japanese

Einstein Girl (Japanese: アインシュタインガール, Hepburn: Ainshutain gāru) is a 2005 Japanese science fiction romantic drama film written and directed by Ataru Oikawa. It was released on 16 July 2005 by Argo Pictures, in Japan.

== Cast ==
- Mayuko Iwasa
- Megumi Komatsu
- Rina Akiyama
- Rina Koike
- Seiji Fukushi
- Tomorowo Taguchi

== Release ==
Einstein Girl was released on 16 July 2005 by Argo Pictures, in Japan. The film was later released on DVD on 22 December 2005 by Geneon Entertainment.
