= X-Cross =

2007 Japanese film by Kenta Fukasaku

- U.S. DVD cover
- Directed by: Kenta Fukasaku
- Screenplay by: Tetsuya Oishi
- Based on: Sono Kētai wa X-Cross de by Nobuyuki Jōkō
- Produced by: Masatake Kondô
- Starring: Nao Matsushita; Ami Suzuki; Shoko Nakagawa; Maju Ozawa; Hiroyuki Ikeuchi
- Cinematography: Takashi Komatsu
- Edited by: Chieko Suzaki
- Music by: Yoshihiro Ike
- Production companies: Toei Company; Avex Entertainment; Earth Star Entertainment; IMJ Entertainment; Studio Swan; Memory Tech; Quaras
- Distributed by: Toei
- Release date: December 1, 2007 (Japan)
- Running time: 90 minutes
- Country: Japan
- Language: Japanese

X-Cross (Japanese: エクスクロス 魔境伝説, Hepburn: Ekusu Kurosu Makyō Densetsu; lit. X-Cross: Legend of the Devil's Nest) is a 2007 Japanese action horror film directed by Kenta Fukasaku, based on the novel Sono Kētai wa X-Cross de (そのケータイはXXで; lit. The Cellphone Is an X-Cross) by Nobuyuki Jōkō. The film stars Nao Matsushita, Ami Suzuki, Shoko Nakagawa, Maju Ozawa, and Hiroyuki Ikeuchi.

== Plot ==
Recovering from a failed love affair, Shiori Mizuno accepts her best friend Aiko Hiuke's invitation to go visit a hot spring resort in isolated Ashikari Village. Once there, the two friends soon discover that the villagers are all a part of a brutal cult that abducts women from outside and cuts their legs off. They are separated and use their cell phones to stay in contact and look for each other as Shiori tries to evade the villagers and unravel the mystery, while Aiko does battle with the scissor-wielding Reika, who has a homicidal grudge against her.

== Cast ==
- Nao Matsushita as Shiyori Mizuno
- Ami Suzuki as Aiko Hiuke
- Shoko Nakagawa as Yayoi Tachibana
- Maju Ozawa as Reika Saionji
- Hiroyuki Ikeuchi as Keiichi Asamiya
- Ayuko Iwane as Shizuka Mononobe
- Nozomu Iwao as Akira Mononobe

- Rikiya Koyama as Akira Mononobe's voice

- Yoshiyuki Morishita as Yae
- Kyōji Kamui
- Takashi Nishina

== Music ==
The film's ending theme song is "Potential Breakup Song" (こわれそうな愛の歌, Kowaresōna Ai no Uta) by Aly & AJ. Ami Suzuki covered the song under the pseudonym "Ami Suzuki Joins Aly & AJ" to promote the film.

== Home media ==
X-Cross was released in the U.S. on Blu-ray by Media Blasters on September 28, 2021.
