= Lady Boy (song) =

Single by Osaka Performance Doll
- Released: November 2, 1994
- Genre: Jpop
- Length: 4:22
- Label: Epic JP
- Songwriter: Shima Takemi

"Lady Boy" (レディ・ボーイ, Redi Bōi) is a single by the Jpop group Osaka Performance Doll and was used as the second closing theme for the Japanese-language dub of the 1987 Ninja Turtles series. It was written by Takemi Shima and composed by Tsugutoshi Goto. It was released by Epic Records on November 2, 1994 in Japan only and is coupled with the song "So Blue so Funny".

- "Lady Boy" was used as the second ending theme in the Japanese version of the Teenage Mutant Ninja Turtles anime broadcast — known locally as ミュータント タートルズ.
- While the original U.S. series had its own closing music, the Japanese broadcast often swapped in J-pop songs to better appeal to local fans.

== Track list ==
1. Lady Boy
2. So BLUE So Funny
3. Lady Boy(オリジナル・カラオケ)
  Lady Boy (Orijinaru Karaoke)/Lady Boy (Original Karaoke)
