= Hiroyuki Ikeuchi =

Japanese actor (born 1976)

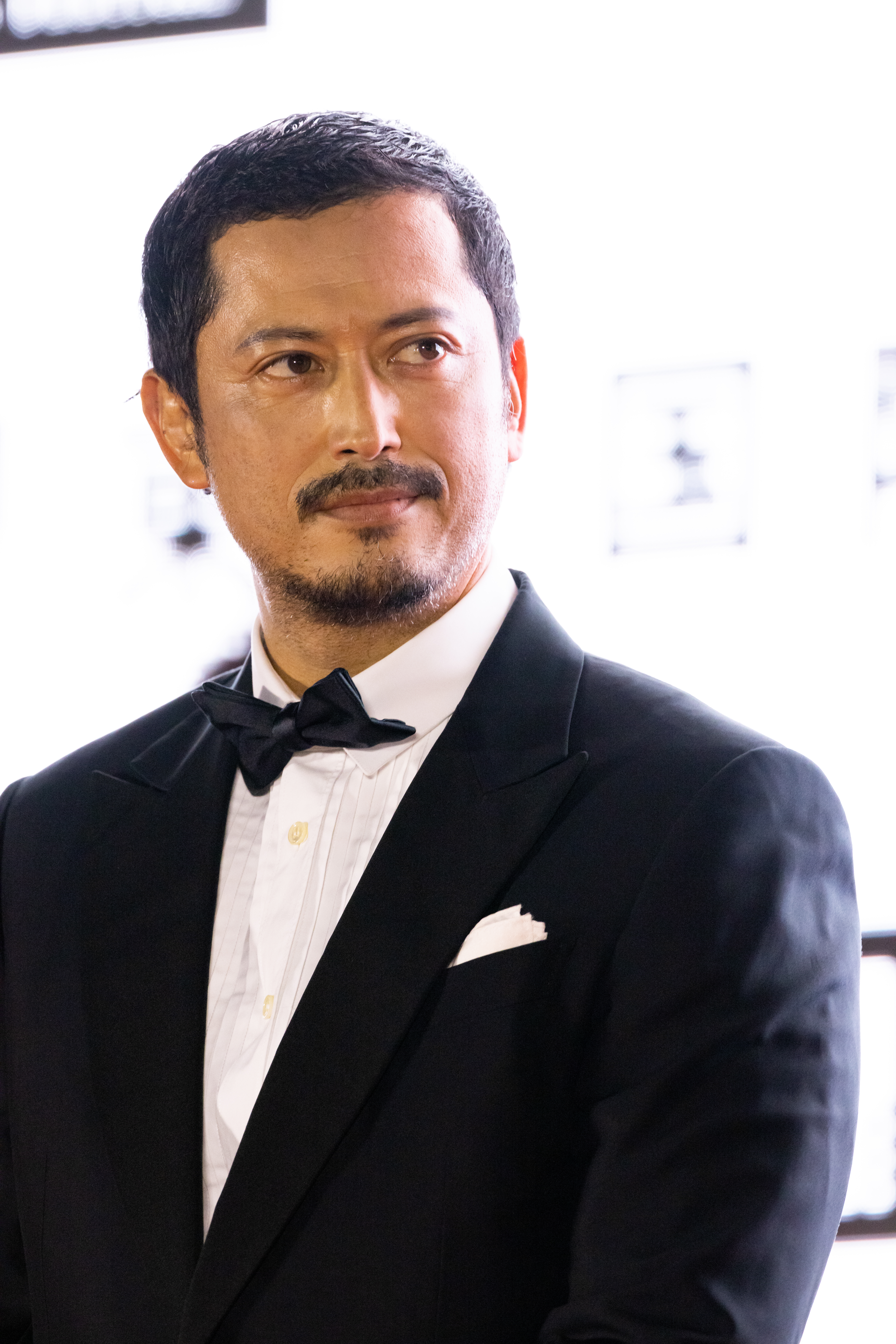
- Ikeuchi in 2022
- Born: November 24, 1976 (age 49); Ibaraki Prefecture, Japan
- Occupations: Actor, martial artist, fisherman
- Years active: 1997–present

Hiroyuki Ikeuchi (池内 博之, Ikeuchi Hiroyuki; born November 24, 1976) is a Japanese actor. Ikeuchi's mother is Salvadoran and his father is Japanese. He is an avid martial artist, notably holding a black belt in judo, and is also a keen fisherman.

== Career ==
Ikeuchi played a supporting role as General Miura in Wilson Yip's Ip Man. He also appeared in Kiyoshi Kurosawa's Charisma.

== Filmography ==
=== Film ===
- Tokimeki Memorial (1997)
- Dream Studium (1997)
- Blues Harp (1999)
- Charisma (1999)
- Space Travelers (2000)
- Chicken Heart (2002)
- The Boat to Heaven (2003)
- Karaoke Terror (2003)
- Warau Iemon (2004)
- Female (2005)
- Hazard (2005)
- Love My Life (2006)
- Dolphine Blue (2007)
- X-Cross (2007)
- Ip Man (2008)
- Team Batista no Eikō (2008)
- The Handsome Suit (2008)
- Otonari (2009)
- Space Battleship Yamato (2010)
- The Wrath of Vajra (2013)
- S The Last Policeman - Recovery of Our Future (2015)
- Railroad Tigers (2016)
- A Sower of Seeds 3 (2016)
- Manhunt (2017)
- Eating Women (2018)
- The Battle: Roar to Victory (2019)
- Limbo (2021)
- Yaksha: Ruthless Operations (2022), Yoshinobu Ozawa
- Sadako DX (2022), Kenshin
- Lightning Over the Beyond (2022)
- Night Flower (2025), Ichiro Yanagi
- Golden Kamuy: The Abashiri Prison Raid (2026), Kiroranke

=== Television dramas ===
- GTO (1998) (Kunio Murai)
  - GTO Revival (2024)
  - GTO 2026 (2026)
- Beautiful Life (1999)
- Shinsengumi! (2004) - Kusaka Genzui
- Tatta Hitotsu no Koi (2006)
- Sengoku Jieitai: Sekigahara no Tatakai (2006)
- Bambino (2007)
- Yae's Sakura (2013) - Kajiwara Heima
- Hero 2 (2014)
- Kaitō Yamaneko (2016) - Katsuaki Inui
- 24 Japan (2020) - Takumi Nanjō
- Giver Taker (2023) - Kaname Imai
- Golden Kamuy: The Hunt of Prisoners in Hokkaido / Karafuto Pursuit Arc (2024–27) - Kiroranke
- Apollo's Song (2025) - Enoki
- Alice in Borderland (2025) - Kazuya

=== Net drama ===
- Informa (Abema, 2024) Takuma Onizuka
