= Atsuko Inaba =

Japanese singer (born 1974)

Atsuko Inaba 稲葉 貴
- Born: March 13, 1974 (age 52)
- Origin: Suita, Osaka, Japan
- Genres: J-pop
- Occupation: Singer
- Years active: 1993–2009
- Formerly of: Osaka Performance Doll; Taiyo to Ciscomoon; Aoiro 7; 7Air; H.P. All Stars; Puripuri Pink
- Website: Hello! Project.com

Atsuko Inaba (稲葉貴子, Inaba Atsuko) (born March 13, 1974) is a former Japanese female singer who was affiliated with Hello! Project.

== Career ==
She began her career as a Japanese idol with the all-girl group Osaka Performance Doll from 1993 to 1996. She then joined the new Hello! Project group Taiyo to Ciscomoon (later named "T&C Bomber") in 1999, until its end in late 2000. She stayed with Hello! Project as a chorus member and dancer, and appeared in the temporary Hello! Project shuffle units Aoiro 7, 7Air, H.P. All Stars, and Puripuri Pink. On October 30, 2009, she announced that her contract with Up-Front Agency, the parent company to Hello! Project, had ended.

== Performances ==
=== Television ===
Show	Start date	End date	Station
Game Catalogue 2 (ゲームカタログ2)	April 1995	September 1995	TV Asahi
Idol o Sagase! (アイドルをさがせ!)	April 2001	March 2002	TV Tokyo
Shin Bishōjo Nikki (新・美少女日記)	October 2001	December 2001	TV Tokyo
Oha Suta (おはスタ)	November 2002	December 2002	TV Tokyo
Bishōjo Nikki III "Little Hospital" (美少女日記III「リトルホスピタル」)	January 2003	March 2003	TV Tokyo

=== Radio ===
Program	Start date	End date	Station
Ikinari Inaba Yoroshiku Yossī (いきなりイナバ★よろしくヨッスィー)	April 6, 2003	March 27, 2004	CBC
TBC Fun Fīrudo Mōretsu Mōdasshu (TBC Funふぃーるど・モーレツモーダッシュ)	June 27, 2005	July 8, 2005	TBC
