= Takako Uehara =

Musical artist (born 1983)

Takako Uehara 上原 多香子
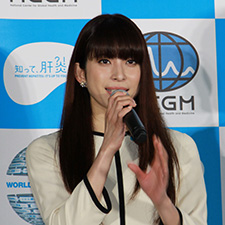

Background information
- Born: January 14, 1983 (age 43); Tomigusuku, Okinawa, Japan
- Genres: Pop; R&B
- Occupations: Singer; actress; model
- Instruments: Vocals; piano
- Years active: 1995–present
- Labels: Toy's Factory; Sonic Groove
- Spouse(s): Tenn (m. 2012; died 2014) Kazuya Koh (m. 2018)
- Website: Avex Uehara Takako

Takako Uehara (上原 多香子, Uehara Takako; born January 14, 1983) is a Japanese pop singer, actress, and former radio host. She was a member of the group Speed. Uehara was born in Okinawa, Japan.

== Personal life ==
Uehara married TENN, one of the singers of J-pop group ET-KING in 2012, but the marriage only lasted two years because her husband committed suicide in 2014. TENN’s suicide note alleged that Uehara was having an affair with Tsuyoshi Abe. Three years after his death, TENN's younger brother leaked a concam recording detailing the transcript of the affair.

Uehara is currently married to stage director Kazuya Koh. On July 13, 2023, Shūkan Bunshun and Friday reported her second extramarital affair.

== History ==
Her first solo single "My First Love" was released in January 1999, and was produced by Ryuichi Kawamura (of Luna Sea). "My First Love" was the beginning of a prosperous collaboration between Uehara and Kawamura. The single sold over 500,000 copies. The promotional video along with the cover and leaflet photos for 'My First Love' were all shot on location in Hawaii. Uehara followed up with her second and third singles, 'Come Close to Me' and 'My Greatest Memories'. In July 2000 following the disbandment of Speed, she became the first member of the group to release a solo album: My First Wing.

After Speed, Uehara continued with a solo career as well as acting in various TV dramas. Takako is also a model endorsing many brands such as Shiseido mainly on Proudia & Tsubaki Shampoo, Dunlop Tyres, NTT DoCoMo, FujiFilm FinePix Camera, SAGAWA, FamilyMart, KC Card, Meiji Chocolate, NEC FOMA and other food & beverages. She teamed up with Vivian Hsu to promote Shiseido's 'Proudia' range of products aimed at the more youthful market.

Uehara has also been a pinup model. She has released three photobooks. The first being '17' which was released in 2000. Her second photobook was Vingt Takako (Vingt means 20 in French). Vingt Takako was controversial as the book contained many semi-nude and erotic shots of her – some containing explicit poses. Uehara stated that the photos were tastefully done and shot on location in France by an all female crew. Uehara's third photobook Veintitres (meaning 23 in Spanish) was of similar nature to Vingt Takako but contained less explicit photos of her. Veintitres was shot on location in Mexico, this time with a mixed crew. The photobook contained a bonus 'making of DVD'. Uehara's has a preference for her photographs to be taken with minimal make-up and touch-up/alterations.

Uehara was selected by Taiwanese singer, Leehom Wang, to be the female lead for his music video, 'Heartbeat'. This is the 1st collaboration between the both of them.

== Releases ==
=== Singles ===
1. "my first love" (1999-03-25)
2. "Come close to me" (1999-09-29)
3. "my greatest memories" (2000-04-19)
4. "SWEET DREAMS" (2001-04-18)
5. "Kiss you Jōnetsu" (Kiss you 情熱, kiss you passion) (2002-03-13)
6. "GLORY -Kimi ga Iru Kara-" (GLORY －君がいるから－, glory – because you are there) (2002-05-22)
7. "Air" (2002-09-19)
8. "Make-up Shadow" (2003-03-12)
9. "Bluelight Yokohama" (ブルーライト・ヨコハマ, burūraito yokohama) (2004-02-25)
10. "Galaxy Legend/Ladybug" (2004-10-20)

=== Albums ===
1. first wing (2000-07-26)
2. pupa (2003-03-26)
3. depart ～takako uehara single collection～ (2007-03-14)

=== DVDs / Videos ===
1. MY FIRST WING (2000-09-27)(video)
2. TAKAKO UEHARA ON REEL-CLIPS&MORE (2003-03-19)(DVD)

=== Photobooks ===
1. 17 (2000-10-10)
2. vingt Takako (2003-01-14)
3. Veintitres (2006-02-14)

=== Other Official Book(s) ===
1. YunTaKu Diary / ゆんたく日記 (2006-08-28)

=== Radio Host ===
1. 2003.10.1～T-FM 「上原多香子のクローストゥユー」

=== Drama(s) ===
1. 1999.4-6NTV 「蘇る金狼」
2. 2000.10 CX 「ナースのお仕事 3」
3. 2000.10-12NTV 「新宿 暴走救急隊」
4. 2001.7NTV系 「ビューティ 7 （セブン）」 (Beauty 7)
5. 2002.1 NTV系 「ナースマン」
6. 2002.5.16CX 「青（ブルー）に恋して！ ～サッカー通と4人の美女の物語～ 最終回
7. 2002.10.1CX 「フライングボーイズ」
8. 2003.9.29NHK 連続テレビ小説「てるてる家族」
9. 2004.4.6NTV系 「ナースマンSPECIAL」
10. 2004.4.10NTV系 「東京ワンダーホテル」
11. 2004.7.24NTV系 「東京ワンダーホテル」
12. 2006.9.7 NHK系 「ちいさこべ」
13. The Fugitive: Plan B (KBS, 2010)

=== Movie(s) ===
- 1998: Andromedia (Together with fellow Speed members Hiroko Shimabukuro, Eriko Imai, and Hitoe Arakaki.)
- 1999: Dream Maker
- 2002: Digimon Frontier: Island of Lost Digimon
- 2004: Pokémon: Destiny Deoxys, Yuko (voice)
- 2008: Dreaming Awake
- 2011: Koitanibashi, Tomoko

=== Musical(s) ===
1. 2005.11.03 ~ 11.27 LITTLE SHOP OF HORRORS
2. 2008.02.06 ~ 02.28 The Wedding Singer
