= Koitanibashi =

- DVD cover
- Directed by: Kōichi Gotō
- Screenplay by: Masako Inoue; Kōichi Gotō
- Based on: Koitanibashi by Takushi Miyao
- Produced by: Shūichi Isoda; Kei Sawada; Mutsumi Iwakura
- Starring: Takako Uehara; Kensei Mikami
- Cinematography: Kazunari Tanaka; Kazushige Tanaka
- Music by: Takeo Katō
- Production companies: Pal Entertainments Production; Pony Canyon
- Distributed by: Pal Entertainments Production
- Release date: November 12, 2011 (Japan)
- Running time: 113 minutes
- Country: Japan
- Language: Japanese

Koitanibashi (Japanese: 恋谷橋), also known as Valley of Dreams or Koitani Bashi: La Vallee de l'amour, is a 2011 Japanese drama film directed by Kōichi Gotō.

== Cast ==
- Takako Uehara
- Kensei Mikami
- Mayuko Iwasa

== Production ==
The film was shot in Misasa, Tottori.
