= Maju Ozawa =

Japanese actress (born 1977)

- 小沢真珠
- Born: Noriko Hijikata (土方 典子); January 3, 1977 (age 49); Tokyo, Japan
- Occupation: Actress
- Years active: 1993–present
- Agent: Box Corporation
- Spouse: Unknown (m. 2014)
- Children: 2

Noriko Hijikata (土方 典子, Hijikata Noriko; born January 3, 1977), better known by her stagename Maju Ozawa (小沢 真珠) is a Japanese actress.

== Early life and career ==
Maju Ozawa was born Noriko Hijikata in Tokyo's Kagurazaka, Shinjuku Ward. She attended Oyu Gakuen Girls' Junior and Senior High School where she became a basketball athlete for three years.

When she was in elementary school, she was scouted many times by entertainment agencies, though she could not pursue a career in show business at that time due to her strict household. However, during highschool her desire to "try it after all" grew stronger. In the spring of 1993, in her second year of high school, she was scouted in Shibuya on her way home from school and joined an agency. There, her stage name was decided by the agency's president after her large, shining eyes were described as "pearl-like" (Maju; 真珠). Her first project was her gravure photoshoot that were published in a Seinen manga magazine.

Ozawa made her television debut in Kamisama no Tsumiboshi in September 1993, and her film debut in Rokudenashi Blues in 1996. A year later in 1997, she appeared in the drama series Amakara- shan. In 1998, she made her stage debut in Nakajima Ramo's Kodomo no Issho.

In 2000, she appeared in a photobook called "GO MAJU GO". Ozawa also received offers to appear in gravure photos after appearing in a Hong Kong film.

In 2004, She appeared in the television drama Peony and Rose, where she gained widespread attention for her role as a bully.

== Personal life ==
On January 31, 2014, Ozawa announced her marriage to a dentist, who is eight years her junior. They also revealed that they were expecting their first child. She gave birth to her first child, a daughter, on August 28 of that year.

On June 15, 2016, she announced that she was pregnant with her second child and gave birth to her second daughter on October 26.

== Filmography ==
=== Film ===
Year	Title	Role	Notes	Ref.
2007	X-Cross	Reika Saionji		

=== Television ===
Year	Title	Role	Notes	Ref.
1993	God's Atonement		Debut	
1994	Dream Calendar Magistrate of Nagasaki		Episode 4	
1994	Sayonara Ari	Ai Sakakibara		
1994	The Summer I Spent With You	Kanako Tachibana		
1995	Wavering Feelings	Moeko Hirooka		
1996	Handsome Man	Moeko Takami		
1996	Mischievous Kiss	Reiko Matsumoto		
1997	Saotome Chiharu's Tour Guide Report	Kaori Kirishima		
2003	Inspector Totsugawa Series 30: Paris-Tokyo Murder Route	Miyuki Kitagawa		
2010	Auntie President Murasaki's Crime Cleaning Diary!: Garbage Knows Murder	Ayaka Yamazaki	Season 8	
2011	Shoplifting G-Men Nikaido Yuki 20	Yoko Katagiri		
2011	Reiko Kamijo's Case Mystery	Erika Yamada		
2011	Inspector Midorikawa Series	Sayoko Yamashita		
2012	Inspector Totsugawa Series 47: Atami/Yugawara Murder Case	Aya Tachibana		
2013	Matsumoto Seicho's 20th Anniversary Special: Cold Current	Reika		
2013	Metropolitan Police Department Forensics Division: Nanbara Kanji's Appraisal	Noriko Karasawa		
2014	Female Interrogator 3	Kazue Fukamachi		
2014	Metropolitan Police Department Mobile Investigation Unit 216	Ayako Kikuchi		
2014	New Settlement Negotiator Secret File	Reiko Shirota	Season 4	
