= Female (2005 film) =

- Poster
- Directed by: Ryuichi Hiroki; Suzuki Matsuo; Shinya Tsukamoto; Tetsuo Shinohara; Miwa Nishikawa
- Written by: Various
- Produced by: Munehiro Umemura
- Starring: Kyōko Hasegawa; Hiroyuki Ikeuchi; Saki Takaoka; Nene Otsuka; Chihiro Otsuka; Eri Ishida
- Release date: 2005
- Running time: 118 minutes
- Country: Japan
- Language: Japanese

Female (Japanese: フィーメイル, Hepburn: Fīmeiru) is a 2005 Japanese release consisting of five short films by different directors, each based on a short story by a popular Japanese woman writer and focusing on the nature of women's sexuality.

== Details ==
The five sections are as follows:

=== Momo (Peaches) ===
Based on a story by Kaoruko Himeno, directed by Tetsuo Shinohara and starring Kyōko Hasegawa, Hiroyuki Ikeuchi and Eri Nomura.

=== Taiyo no Mieru Basho Made (Drive Until you See the Sun) ===
Based on a story by Yuzuki Muroi, directed by Ryuichi Hiroki and starring Chihiro Otsuka, Mitsuko Ishii and Hairi Katagiri.

=== Yoru no Shita (Licking Nights) ===
Based on a story by Kei Yuikawa, directed by Suzuki Matsuo and starring Saki Takaoka.

=== Megami no Kakato (Heels of the Muse) ===
Based on a story by Asa Nonami, directed by Miwa Nishikawa and starring Nene Otsuka and Naoyuki Morita.

=== Tamamushi (Jewel Beetle) ===
Based on a story by Mariko Koike, directed by Shinya Tsukamoto and starring Eri Ishida, Ryō Kase and Kaoru Kobayashi.

== Reception ==
The film was reviewed positively by critic Russell Edwards for Variety as a celebration of modern womanhood and sexuality in Japan.
