= Mayuko Iwasa =

Japanese gravure idol

- 岩佐 真悠子
- Born: February 24, 1987 (age 39); Nerima, Tokyo, Japan
- Occupations: actress; model
- Years active: 2003–2020
- Agent: Platinum Production
- Height: 1.55 m (5 ft 1 in)

Mayuko Iwasa (岩佐 真悠子, Iwasa Mayuko; born February 24, 1987 in Nerima, Tokyo) is a former Japanese entertainer, model, and actress. She was formerly represented by Platinum Production. Among numerous other television and film appearances, she played the lead role in the film adaptation of Kaoruko Himeno's novel Junan (受難, Passion).

== Career ==
Iwasa was Miss Magazine 2003. She was awarded the Graph Prize, the 42nd Golden Arrow Awards (2004) in March 2005.

In June 2005, Iwasa recorded a duet with Naoya Ogawa called "Katte ni Shinryakusha" (An Invader in My Own Way), which was used as an ending song of Sgt. Frog. The two appeared on Music Station and Pop Jam. Iwasa was in the drama Gal Circle as Rika, a ganguro girl who scams her friends for money. In 2013 she played the lead role in Junan (受難, Passion), the film adaptation of Kaoruko Himeno's novel about a woman who grows a talking face near her genitals after asking God for help.

On October 1, 2020, she announced her decision to retire from the entertainment industry and take a new career of nursing care.

== Filmography ==
=== Films ===
- Space Police (2004)
- Shibuya Kaidan: Sa-chan no Toshi Densetsu (2004)
- Chicken Deka (2004)
- Umeku Haisuikan (2004)
- Omoi no Iro (2004)
- Swing Girls (2004) - Chie
- Sayonara Midori-chan (2005)
- Einstein Girl (2005)
- Space Police (2005)
- Sugar and Spice (Shugā & supaisu: Fūmi zekka) (2006) - Yoko
- Carved 2 (Kuchisake-Onna 2: The Scissors Massacre) (2008) - Yukie Sawada
- Kujira: Gokudo no Shokutaku (2009)
- Beautiful Female Panther: Body Sniper (Utsukushiki mehyo: Body Sniper) (2010)
- Tensou Sentai Goseiger Returns! The Last Epic (2011)
- Koitani Bashi: La Vallee de l'amour (2011)
- MILOCRORZE - A Love Story (2012) - Yukine
- Actress (2012) - Akari Hazuki
- Shinobido (2012)
- Junan (受難, Passion) (2013) - Francesco
- 009-1: The End of the Beginning (2013) - Mylene Hoffman
- Cult (カルト, Karuto) (2013) - Mayuko Iwasa (herself)
- Her Granddaughter (2015)

=== TV Movies ===
Year	Title	Role	Network
2006	Detective Conan: Kudo Shinichi's Written Challenge	Sonoko Suzuki	YTV
2006	Sengoku Jieitai: Sekigahara no Tatakai	Osen	NTV
2007	Detective Conan: Kudo Shinichi Returns! Showdown with the Black Organization	Sonoko Suzuki	NTV
2008	Hanazakari no Kimitachi e SP	Hibari Hanayashiki	Fuji TV

=== Television dramas ===
Year	Title	Role
2005	Ganbatte Ikimasshoi	Taeko "Dakko" Kikuchi (unknown episodes)
2005	Seishun no mon: Chikuhō hen (miniseries)	Female Student of Tagawa Chugaku
2006	Detective Conan	Sonoko Suzuki
2006	Gal Circle	Rika
2006	Nodame Cantabile	Reina Ishikawa
2007	Hanazakari no Kimitachi e	Hanayashiki Hibari
2007	Hell Girl	Natsuko Yuki
2007	Liar Game	Ishida Rie
2009	Mei-chan no Shitsuji	Ryuonji Izumi
2010	Troubleman	Ogi Makiko
2011	Hanazakari no Kimitachi e	Hanayashiki Hibari
