= Owariya =

Oldest restaurant in Kyoto

Honke Owariya
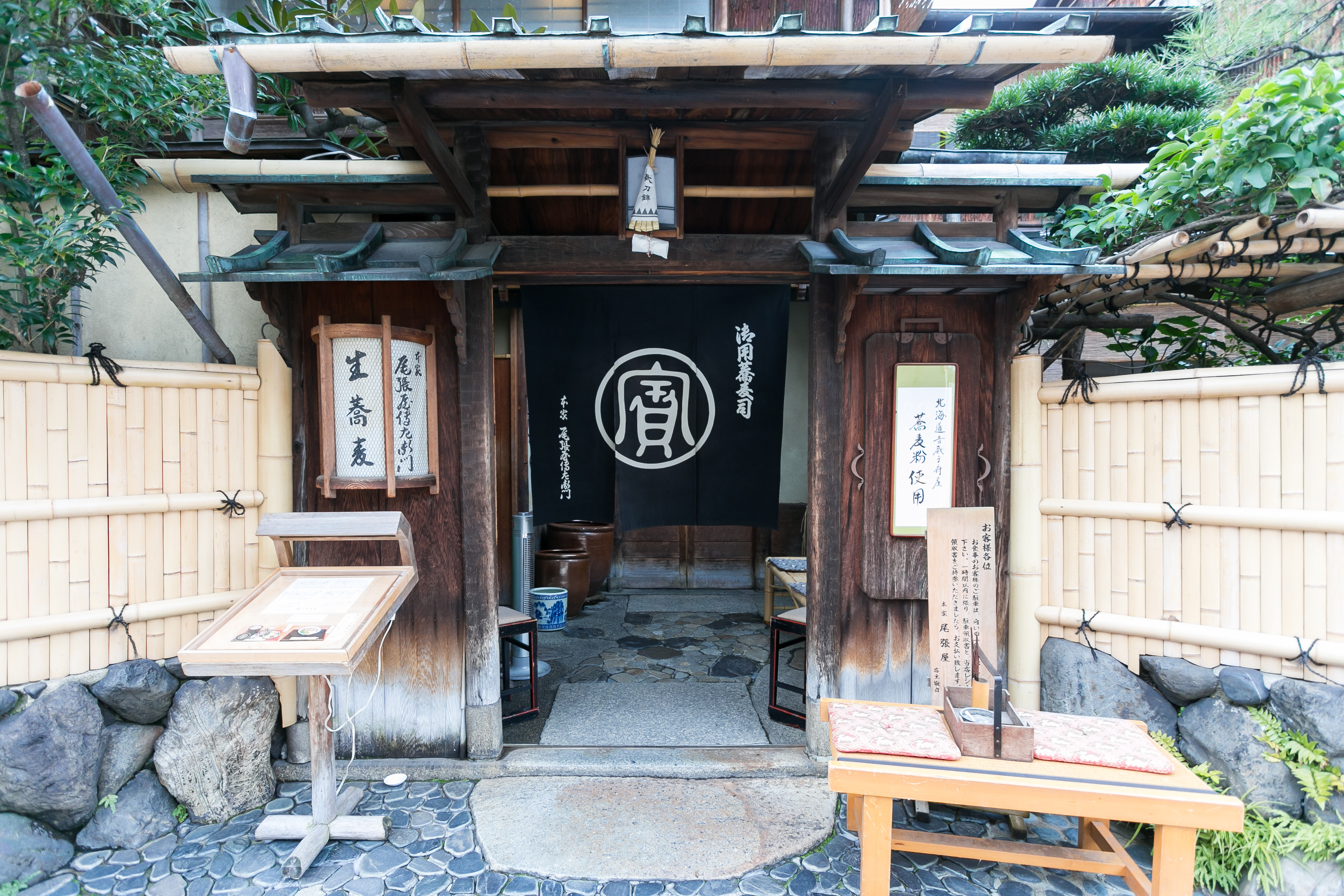
- Native name: 本家尾張屋本店
- Industry: Restaurant
- Founded: 1465
- Headquarters: 322 Niomontsukinukecho, Nakagyo-ku Kyoto-shi, 604-0841 Kyoto, Japan
- Website: honke-owariya.co.jp/en

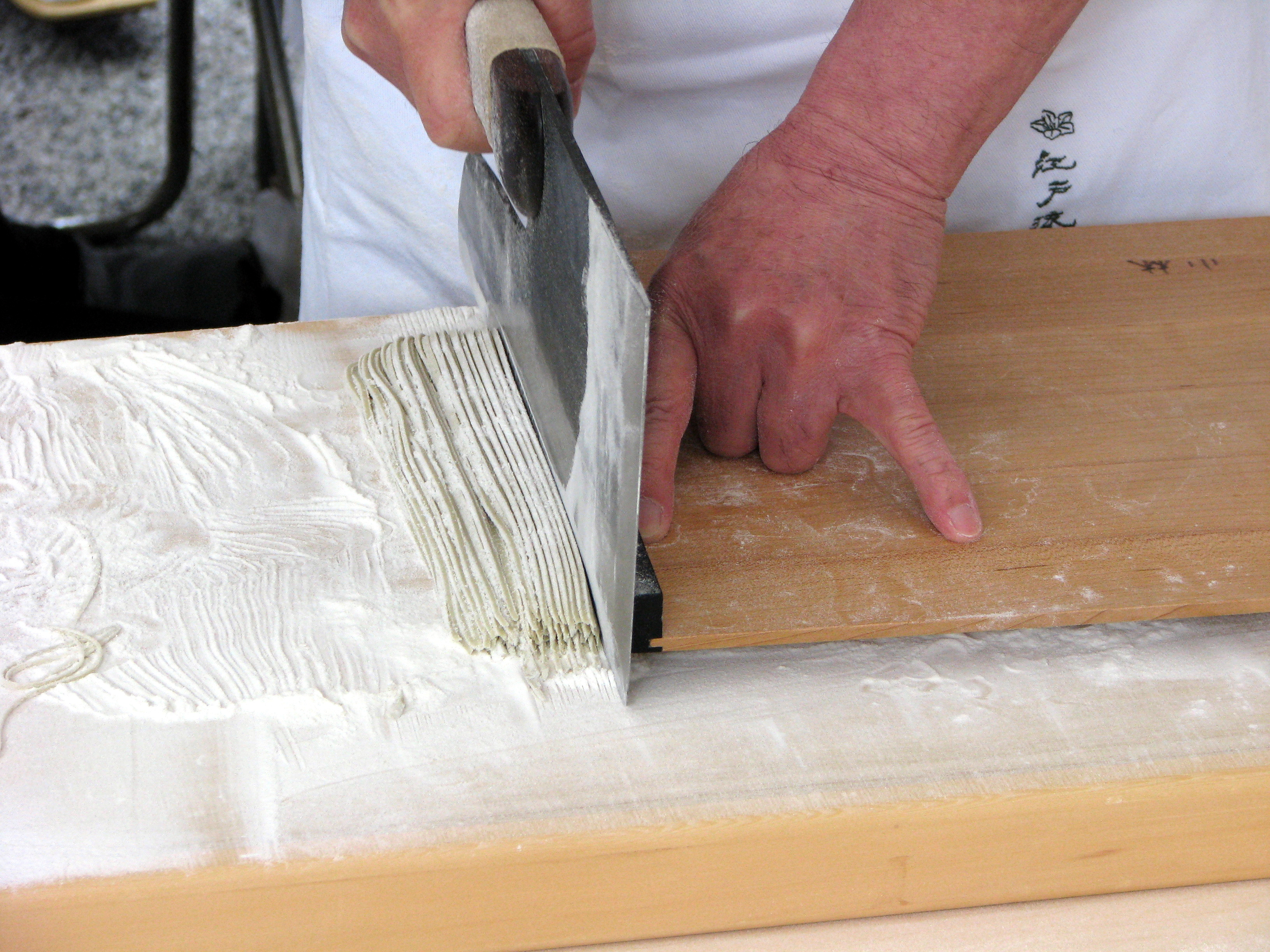
Preparing Soba noodles

Owariya (Japanese: 尾張屋) or Honke Owariya is the oldest restaurant in Kyoto, Japan and in the country itself; it was founded in 1465. The specialty are traditional buckwheat noodles, called soba. Japan's royal family has been known to eat at the restaurant. The restaurant uses the "freshest" Kyoto spring well water to make its soup broth.

== History ==
The restaurant has been located on the same plot of soil in Kyoto since 1465. Honke Owarya began as a confectionery shop; it was later developed into a soba shop by a chef from Nagoya accompanied by members of the imperial family.

As of January 11, 2026, Honke Owariya's soba restaurant will be closed for a long time, and sweets production and sales will end.

Honke Owariya has been associated with several temples in Kyoto from the Edo Period. It fostered bonds with Zen Buddhist sects from Kennin-ji, Shokoku-ji and Myoshin-ji.

The current and sixteenth owner of Honke Owariya is Ariko Inaoka, who follows in the tradition of her father (the 15th owner) and grandfather (the 14th owner).

== See also ==
- List of oldest companies
