= Charisma (film) =

- Film poster
- Directed by: Kiyoshi Kurosawa
- Written by: Kiyoshi Kurosawa
- Produced by: Atsuyuki Shimoda; Satoshi Jinno
- Starring: Kōji Yakusho; Hiroyuki Ikeuchi; Ren Osugi; Yoriko Douguchi; Jun Fubuki; Akira Otaka; Yutaka Matsushige
- Cinematography: Jun'ichirô Hayashi
- Edited by: Jun'ichi Kikuchi
- Music by: Gary Ashiya
- Release dates: 8 December 1999 (Cannes); 26 February 2000 (Japan)
- Running time: 104 minutes
- Country: Japan
- Language: Japanese

Charisma (Japanese: カリスマ, Hepburn: Karisuma) is a 1999 Japanese philosophical drama film written and directed by Kiyoshi Kurosawa, starring Kōji Yakusho.

The film is about a dispute between a number of people about a unique but possibly toxic tree growing in an unnamed forest. The film is largely seen from the point of view of Goro Yabuike (Kōji Yakusho), a police negotiator who has been relieved of his duties following his failure to prevent the death of an important hostage. He stands in the middle of the conflicting opinions about the future of the tree, and has to decide which course to commit himself to.

== Plot ==
Goro Yabuike is a hostage negotiator. He attends an incident where an MP is being held at gunpoint. The captor's ransom note reads "Restore the Rules of the World". When Yabuike has a chance to shoot the hostage-taker he hesitates. The captor kills the MP, and is in turn killed by the police. Afterwards Yabuike explains that he thought he could help both men. He is suspended from duty. He is dropped off in the middle of a mysterious forest. He comes across various people who are in a dispute about an apparently unique tree named 'Charisma' growing in a clearing in the forest. Jinbo believes the plant is toxic will eventually kill the whole forest. She wants to poison the tree so that the forest can be restored to its original condition. Kiriyama, a former sanatorium patient, wants to protect the tree, even if this leads to the death of the rest of the forest. Other military figures want to take the tree away for a collector.

Yabuike becomes the central figure in the dispute, somehow able to decide what will happen. After the tree has been stolen by the militia, recaptured by Kiriyama with Yabuike's help, and burned by Jinbo, a new, bigger tree appears, possibly similar to Charisma. Yabuike mulls over the two choices he faces: saving the individual tree, or saving the whole forest. He decides that the dichotomy is a false one. First, that life and death are part of the same force, and second, that every tree is a special tree and together they are a forest, but simultaneously no tree signifies anything more than any other, and thus, the forest becomes a collective of "average trees". Ultimately, some will live and some will die and some will be killed and some will be saved.

Immediately following Yabuike's monologue, a set of collectors comes to pay Yabuike off for the tree. While Yabuike rejects it, Chizuru (whom he is speaking to) says, "I understand" and takes off with the money. She is chased by the collectors and subsequently wakes up to see Kiriyama gazing upon her; he brings her into the sanitarium and gives her a glass of water before killing her with his sword. He leaves with the briefcase, in an attempt to return to society, only to be jilted by a group of militant men on a truck who toss their hats at his plea to join them back into society with his briefcase of now-twice-stolen money.

When the head of the militia takes Jinbo hostage, Yabuike has no hesitation in shooting, though not killing, him. The final scene shows Yabuike making his way back to the city to seek treatment for the injured militia. He makes a call to a man he calls "boss," who asks, "What have you done? What on earth have you done?" Yabuike only states, "I'm returning now." In the distance, the city can be seen in flames.

== Cast ==
- Kōji Yakusho - Goro Yabuike
- Hiroyuki Ikeuchi - Kiriyama, who wants to protect the tree
- Ren Osugi - Nakasone
- Jun Fubuki - Mitsuko Jinbo, an expert on plants
- Yoriko Douguchi - Chizuru Jinbo, Mitsuko's sister
- Akira Otaka - Tsuboi
- Yutaka Matsushige - Nekoshima

== Production ==
The screenplay, originally written in the early 1990s, earned Kiyoshi Kurosawa a scholarship from the Sundance Institute to study filmmaking in the United States.

== Release ==
Charisma was shown at the 1999 Cannes Film Festival. It was later released in Japan on February 26, 2000.

== Reception ==
Kris Nelson of Dreamlogic.net gave the film a favorable review, noting that "the soundtrack is perfect". The film has been interpreted by some as an allegorical tale about the structure of Japanese society, and the tension between the importance of individuality on the one hand, and the importance of the group on the other. It is also possible to discern an ecological message. Travis Mackenzie Hoover of Exclaim! said, "with its combination of Tarkovskian natural wonder, Beckett absurdity and good old fashioned movie élan, it's guaranteed that you'll care enough to see into its deeply troubled heart of darkness."

== Notes ==
=== References ===
- Kalat, David (2007). J-horror: The Definitive Guide to The Ring, The Grudge and Beyond. Vertical. ISBN 978-1932234084.
