= Persona (2008 film) =

- Film poster
- Kanji: ペルソナ
- Directed by: Tatsuro Kashihara; Kenji Tanigaki
- Written by: Tatsuro Kashihara
- Starring: Mami Yamasaki; Koji Moritsugu; Kumiko Nakano; Masato Hagiwara; Akira Otaka
- Production companies: CREi, KIC-Factory, Persona Film Partners
- Distributed by: Persona Film Partners, Libero Co., Ltd.
- Release date: January 26, 2008
- Running time: 84 minutes
- Country: Japan
- Language: Japanese

Persona (ペルソナ, Perusona) is a 2008 film written and directed by Tatsuro Kashihara, inspired by the Persona video game franchise. The film premiered on January 1, 2008 in Japan. It was gravure idol Mami Yamasaki's first starring role in a film.

== Synopsis ==
Doctor Koichiro Kiba's wife Sayoko takes a new job at the secret LIS Research Institute, but soon "collapses during the meeting, probably heart failure", and dies, or so we believe. It turns out that her personality was recorded and then put into another woman, Misono, a student who now has two personalities that take turns operating the body. She also develops super-human fighting skills as a "Persona." Several other characters also become Personas, part of a government plan for military use, though originally intended to preserve part of you after death.

== Cast ==
- Mami Yamasaki
- Koji Moritsugu
- Kumiko Nakano
- Masato Hagiwara
- Akira Otaka
- Naoko Inoue
- Makoto Kai
- Yuichi Kimura
- Tôshirô Muraki
- Aimi Nakamura
- Maria Abe
- Satoshi Nikaido
- Naoya Ohshima
- Shirō Sano
- Sawa Suzuki
- Mariko Terada
- Takaki Uda
