= Mami Yamasaki =

Japanese gravure idol and actress (born 1985)

- Born: 山崎 真実; September 20, 1985 (age 41); Osaka, Japan
- Years active: 2004–present
- Agent: Kart Promotion
- Height: 1.69 m (5 ft 7 in)

Yamasaki Mami (山崎 真実; born September 20, 1985) is a Japanese actress and former gravure idol. In addition to appearing in numerous photobooks, she has played roles in television, film, and stage productions, including Gogo Sentai Boukenger, Karate-Robo Zaborgar, the horror drama series Hitokowa, and the stage adaptation of Umimachi Diary.

== Biography ==
Yamasaki was born in Osaka, Japan. While in high school she represented Osaka in a national rhythmic gymnastics competition. In 2004 she won the Miss Magazine Special Reader Award in the annual Miss Magazine gravure contest. Yamasaki appeared in GoGo Sentai Boukenger and Chō Ninja Tai Inazuma!! SPARK as Shizuka of the Wind. After changing management companies in 2012, Yamasaki did not model for any photobooks for several years, only resuming photobook modeling after she turned 30 years old. In 2017 Yamasaki starred in a stage adaptation of the Akimi Yoshida manga Umimachi Diary. In 2018 a photo exhibition featuring previously unpublished photos of Yamasaki was held at Tokyo Arts Gallery. Also in 2018 Yamasaki joined the cast of Hitokowa, a horror drama on the Hikari TV Channel.

== Filmography ==
- GoGo Sentai Boukenger (2006)
- Persona (2008)
- The Seaside Hotel (シーサイドモーテル) (2010)
- Karate-Robo Zaborgar (2011)
- Love Bombs (さまよう獣, Samayou Kemono) (2012)
- Hitokowa (ヒトコワ) (2018)
- Nishinari Goro's 400 Million Yen (2021)
- Ai no Gotoku (2026), Chiho Oikawa
- Kishimi (2026), Yumiko Sakashita
- The Thorn of Sin (2026), Yuko Hashimoto

== Photobooks ==
- Mamizō: Yamasaki Mami hatsushashinshū (MAMI蔵: 山崎真実初写真集), Saibunkan Shuppan, 2005, ISBN 9784775600627
- My Mami (マイマミ), Kodansha, 2005, ISBN 9784063646573
- 21, Gakushū Kenkyūsha, 2007, ISBN 9784054031272
- Ren'ai (恋愛, Love), Futabasha, 2008, ISBN 9784575300741
- Anata e (あなたへ, To You), Shueisha, 2011, ISBN 9784087806113
- Manma to uso (まんまとうそ, Plain Lies), Wani Books, 2017, ISBN 9784847049026
- re., Kobunsha, 2018, ISBN 9784334902261
