= Black Widow Business =

- Poster
- Kanji: 後妻業の女
- Romanization: Gosaigyo no Onna
- Directed by: Yasuo Tsuruhashi
- Screenplay by: Yasuo Tsuruhashi
- Story by: Hiroyuki Kurokawa
- Produced by: Minami Ichikawa
- Starring: Shinobu Otake; Etsushi Toyokawa; Machiko Ono; Kyōko Hasegawa; Asami Mizukawa; Kimiko Yo; Akira Emoto; Shōfukutei Tsurube II; Masahiko Tsugawa; Masatoshi Nagase
- Cinematography: Katsumi Yanagishima
- Edited by: Hiroshi Yamada
- Music by: Juri Nakanishi
- Distributed by: Toho
- Release date: August 27, 2016 (Japan)
- Running time: 128 minutes
- Country: Japan
- Language: Japanese
- Box office: US$10.5 million

Black Widow Business (Japanese: 後妻業の女, Hepburn: Gosaigyō no Onna) is a 2016 Japanese crime comedy film directed by Yasuo Tsuruhashi. It was released in Japan by Toho on August 27, 2016.

== Cast ==
- Shinobu Otake
- Etsushi Toyokawa
- Machiko Ono
- Kyōko Hasegawa
- Asami Mizukawa
- Shunsuke Kazama
- Kimiko Yo
- Mimura
- Satoru Matsuo
- Tsuruko Shōfukutei
- Asuka Hinoi
- Zen Kajihara
- Naomasa Musaka
- Reo Morimoto
- Masatō Ibu
- Shigeru Izumiya
- Akira Emoto
- Shōfukutei Tsurube II
- Masahiko Tsugawa
- Masatoshi Nagase

== Reception ==
The film was 4th placed at the Japanese box office on its opening weekend, with 182,555 admissions, and grossed ¥215 million.
