= Kumiko Nakano =

Japanese actress

Nakano Kumiko (中野公美子, born March 3, 1977, in Osaka) is an actress who debuted as a Japanese idol with the girl band Osaka Performance Doll from 1993 to 1997.

== Television ==
- 星の金貨 (Hoshi no kinka)
- 竜馬におまかせ!
- Beautiful (ビューティー7)
- 歓迎！ダンジキ御一行様
- 木綿のハンカチ2
- 世紀末の晩鐘

== Filmography ==
- たこやき刑事 (Takoyaki Keiji, lit. "takoyaki detective"?)
- Persona (2008)
