= Kaoruko Himeno =

Japanese writer

- 姫野 カオルコ
- Born: 1958 (age 67–68); Shiga Prefecture, Japan
- Education: Aoyama Gakuin University
- Occupations: Writer, novelist, essayist
- Writing career
- Language: Japanese
- Genres: Fiction; Novel; Essay
- Notable works: Junan; Tsu, i, ra, ku; Haruka at 80; Real Cinderella; Showa no inu
- Notable awards: Naoki Prize
- Website: himenoshiki.com

Kaoruko Himeno (姫野 カオルコ, Himeno Kaoruko) is a Japanese writer. She has been nominated five times for the Naoki Prize and won the 150th Naoki Prize for her novel Showa Dog (昭和の犬, Showa no inu). Two of her novels have been adapted for film.

== Early life and education ==
Himeno was born in 1958 in Shiga Prefecture, Japan. She moved to Tokyo and graduated from Aoyama Gakuin University, then worked part-time at a gallery so she could return frequently to Shiga Prefecture and help with her father's illness.

== Career ==
At age 32 Himeno made her fiction debut in 1990 with her comedic novel Hito yonde mitsuko (ひと呼んでミツコ, People Call Her Mitsuko). More novels and essay collections followed, including the 1991 essay collection Ren'aidekinai shokubutsugun (恋愛できない食物群), the 1992 novel Shikaku kankei (四角関係), and the 1995 essay collection Busu no kuse ni! (ブスのくせに!). Himeno's novel Junan (受難, The Passion), a story about a woman in a convent who grows a talking face near her genitals after asking God for help, was published in 1997 and shortlisted for the Naoki Prize. Junan was later adapted into a 2013 film of the same name starring Mayuko Iwasa.

In 2003 her novel Tsu, i, ra, ku (ツ, イ, ラ, ク, C,R,A,S,H), a story that follows young girls from second grade through first loves and sexual experiences, was nominated for the Naoki Prize. Tsu, i, ra, ku was later adapted into one segment of the 2005 anthology film female (フィーメイル) starring Kyōko Hasegawa. Her 2005 novel Haruka eiti (ハルカ・エイティ, Haruka at 80) and 2010 novel Riaru shinderera (リアル・シンデレラ, Real Cinderella) were also nominated for the Naoki Prize in their respective years, but did not win. In 2009 Himeno collaborated with manga artist Ebine Yamaji to create the book Shimi (青痣(しみ)).

After being nominated five times for the Naoki Prize, Himeno won the 150th Naoki Prize for her semi-autobiographical 2013 novel Showa Dog (昭和の犬, Showa no inu). Himeno was exercising at the gym at the time of the announcement and had to rush to the press conference in her tracksuit, which she joked about with reporters in her interviews.

== Recognition ==
- 2014 150th Naoki Prize (2013下)

== Film adaptations ==
- female (フィーメイル), 2005
- Junan (受難, Passion), 2013

== Works ==
- Hito yonde mitsuko (ひと呼んでミツコ, People Call Her Mitsuko), Kodansha, 1990, ISBN 9784062047852
- Garasu no kamen no kokuhaku (ガラスの仮面の告白), Shufunotomo, 1990, ISBN 9784079358255
- Ren'aidekinai shokubutsugun (恋愛できない食物群), Mainichi Shimbunsha, 1991, ISBN 9784620308166
- Shikaku kankei (四角関係), Kodansha, 1992, ISBN 9784062060592
- Busu no kuse ni! (ブスのくせに!), Mainichi Shimbunsha, 1995, ISBN 9784620310886
- Junan (受難, The Passion), Bungeishunjū, 1997, ISBN 9784163168401
- Tsuiraku (ツ, イ, ラ, ク, C,R,A,S,H), Kadokawa Shoten, 2003, ISBN 9784048734936
- Haruka eiti (ハルカ・エイティ, Haruka at 80), Bungeishunjū, 2005, ISBN 9784163243405
- (with Ebine Yamaji) Shimi (青痣(しみ)), Fusosha, 2009, ISBN 9784594059392
- Showa no inu: Pasupekutivu kiddo (昭和の犬:Perspective kid, Showa Dog: Perspective Kid), Gentosha, 2013, ISBN 9784344024465
