= Tenn (MC) =

Japanese singer (1978–2014)

- Born: Takahiro Moriwaki; 11 December 1978; Higashiōsaka, Osaka Prefecture, Japan
- Died: 25 September 2014 (aged 35); Tennōji-ku, Osaka, Osaka Prefecture, Japan
- Occupation: MC
- Years active: 1999–2014
- Spouse: Takako Uehara (m. 2012–2014)

Tenn (stylized as TENN; 11 December 1978 – 25 September 2014) was a Japanese MC who was a member of the J-pop group ET-King. He was from Osaka Prefecture. His real name was Takahiro Moriwaki (森脇 隆宏, Moriwaki Takahiro). His wife was Takako Uehara of Speed.

== Biography ==
He was from Higashiōsaka, Osaka Prefecture. He graduated from St. Andrew's School. In 1999, he formed the band "ET-King" with Itokin and Klutch. Prior to their formation, he was a drummer in rock bands. He was a skilled rapper.

On 9 March 2012, he announced his engagement with Takako Uehara a member of the music group "Speed" and an actress. They later married on 23 August 2012.

He committed suicide on 25 September 2014, aged 35.

In August 2017, Japanese publications Josei Seven and NEWS Post Seven published portions of Tenn's suicide note, shared by his family, which included references to his wife having an affair with Tsuyoshi Abe. Portions of photographed chat transcripts between his wife and Abe, discovered on Tenn's personal phone, were also published.

== Discography ==
The list does not include his works with ET-King

=== Guest appearances ===
Artist	Song
Sibling	Game feat. Tenn (from ET-King)
