= Akira Otaka =

Japanese actor

Akira Otaka (大鷹 明良, Otaka Akira) (born 1957) is a Japanese actor.

== Selected filmography ==
=== Films ===
- Charisma (1999)
- Cream Lemon (2004)
- Persona (2008)
- Climber's High (2008)
- The Great Passage (2013)
- The Vancouver Asahi (2014)
- My Tomorrow, Your Yesterday (2016)
- My Teacher (2017)
- Outrage Coda (2017)
- Narratage (2017)
- Paradise Next (2019)
- Baian the Assassin, M.D. (2023)
- The Young Strangers (2024)
- Tsuki no Inu (2026)

=== Television ===
- Fūrin Kazan (2007), Takanashi Masayori
- Segodon (2018), Yamauchi Yōdō
- Hanzawa Naoki (2020), the prime minister Ichirō Matoba
- Laughing Matryoshka (2024), Habu Masafumi
- Gannibal Season 2 (2025), Mitsuru Yachiyo
- Unbound (2025), Makino Sadanaga
