= Kyōko Hasegawa =

Japanese model and actress

- 長谷川 京子
- Born: 22 July 1978 (age 48); Funabashi, Chiba, Japan
- Occupations: Actress and model
- Years active: 1996–present
- Height: 1.66 m (5 ft 5 1/2 in)
- Spouse: Haruichi Shindō (m. 2008; div. 2021)
- Children: 2
- Website: www.lespros.co.jp/en/talent/artists/kyoko_hasegawa/

Kyōko Hasegawa (長谷川 京子, Hasegawa Kyōko; born 22 July 1978 in Chiba Prefecture, Japan) is a Japanese model and actress.

== Personal life ==
Hasegawa married Haruichi Shindō, one of the members of the rock band Porno Graffitti, in 2008. On May 30, 2009, she gave birth to a boy. On January 25, 2012, she gave birth to a girl. In 2021, Hasegawa and Shindo announced that they had divorced.

== Appearances ==
=== TV dramas ===
- Big Money! (2001)
- Sutaa no Koi (2001)
- Pretty Girls (2002)
- Kowloon de Aimashō (2002)
- Kanojotachi no Kurisumasu (2002)
- Itsumo futari de (2003)
- Boku dake no Madonna (2003)
- Wonderful Life (2004)
- Three Extremes (Box) (2004)
- Fuyu no Undōkai (2005)
- M no Higeki (2005)
- Dragon Zakura (2005)
- Female (2005)
- Sanae Oishii puropōzu (2006)
- Kōmyō ga Tsuji (2006), Hosokawa Gracia
- The Family (2007), Sanae Manpyo
- Scandal (2008)
- Rain Fall (2009)
- Angel Bank as Ino Mamako (2010)
- Boss 2 (2011)
- Ranma 1/2 (2011)
- Yae's Sakura (2013)
- Haitatsu Saretai Watashitachi (2013)
- Oh, My Dad!! (2013)
- Saigo Kara Nibanme no Koi (2014)
- Petero no Sōretsu (2014)
- Mother Game: Kanojotachi no Kaikyū (2015)
- Innocent Days (2018)
- Bakabon no Papa yori Baka na Papa (2018)
- The Supporting Actors 3 (2021), Herself
- Fishbowl Wives (2022)
- House of the Owl (2024)
- Strobe Edge (2025–26)

=== Films ===
- Three...Extremes (2004)
- Female (2005)
- Jiyuu renai (2005)
- Taitei no ken (2006)
- Ai no Rukeichi (2007)
- Rain Fall (2009)
- Sakurada Mongai no Hen (2010)
- Black Widow Business (2016)
- And Then There Was Light (2017)
- You Shine in the Moonlit Night (2019)

== Bibliography ==
=== Magazines ===
- CanCam, Shogakukan 1982-, as an exclusive model from 1997 to 2002

=== Photobooks ===
- Kyōfū (March 2001, Wani Books) ISBN 4847026497
- Ariko and Takay, Key of Life (5 September 2003, Penguin Shobō) ISBN 4901978098
