= Tokyo Performance Doll =

Japanese idol girl group

- Origin: Japan
- Genres: J-pop
- Years active: 1990–1996, 2013–2021

Tokyo Performance Doll also known as TPD (東京パフォーマンスドール) was a J-pop idol girl group that was active from 1990 to 1996 and from 2013 until 2021. Inspired by Onyanko Club, it had seven main members and several other "trainees" for live performances, a formula later followed by Morning Musume, Hello! Project and AKB48. TPD was based in Tokyo, and launched sister-bands in other cities: Osaka Performance Doll in 1993 and Shanghai Performance Doll in 1996. TPD had numerous sub-groups that issued their own singles, while albums were issued collectively. Among TPD's main members were Ryoko Shinohara and East End X Yuri's Yuri Ichii. Trainee members included Yoko Kamon and Yuko Fueki (Yoo Min). In June 2013, it was announced that after 17 years of their first breakup in 1996, the group was being revived with an all new line up. Their music has also been featured in anime series such as Ace Attorney, The Kindaichi Case Files, Ultimate Otaku Teacher, and Beatless. It was announced on May 27, 2021 that the group will be suspending all activities indefinitely after their concert on September 26, 2021, citing lack of events due to the COVID-19 pandemic.

== Revived line-up (2014–2020) ==
- Nana Takashima (leader)
- Seira Jonishi
- Saki Sakurai
- Kaho Hamasaki
- Akari Waki
- Sakurako Iida (graduated on 19 April 2018)
- Saki Jingu (graduated on 19 April 2018)
- Anyu Kobayashi (graduated on 19 April 2018)
- Futaba Tachibana
- Sana Minami (graduated on 25 January 2014)

== Former members (1990–1996) ==
- Ryoko Shinohara
- Yuri Ichii
- Satomi Kihara
- Miho Yonemitsu
- Chisa Kawamura
- Yuko Anai
- Mai Yagita

Secondary members

- Natsuko Kifushi
- Kanako Hitsuwari
- Shiho Shimazu
- Hiromi Seki
- Masako Nakagawa
- Misako Iwana
- Saori Fujimoto
- Aya Shinohara
- Miho Natori
- Fumi Ohto
- Asami Azuma
- Miyabi Arai
- Miho Hirano
- Tomomi Sasaki

== Sub-groups ==
- Golbies Ryoko Shinohara, Chisa Kawamura, Satomi Kihara
- Harajuku Jennu Ryoko Shinohara Chisa Kawamura,
- UL-Says Ryoko Shinohara, Miho Yonemitsu
- ViVA! Yuri Ichii, Yuko Anai, Mai Yagita
- Two Tops Kanako Hitsuwari, Natsuko Kifushi
- Les, TPD Chisa Kawamura, Kanako Hitsuwari, Natsuko Kifushi, Hiromi Seki
- Fire Dolls Kanako Hitsuwari, Natsuko Kifushi, Hiromi Seki, Shiho Shimazu
- Yonemitsu Club Miho Yonemitsu
- TPD DASH!! Natsuko Kifushi, Kanako Hitsuwari, Shiho Shimazu, Hiromi Seki, Masako Nakagawa, Fumi Ohto, Miho Natori, Aya Shinohara, Asami Azuma
- Dorusen from TPD (どるせん from TPD)
- Aka no Ryusei (赤の流星)
- Goo Choki Paa (ぐーちょきぱー)

== Discography ==
=== Albums ===
- 1990.11.21 : Cha-Dance Party Vol. 1
- 1991.07.25 : Cha-Dance Party Vol. 2
- 1991.11.21 : Cha-Dance Party Vol. 3
- 1992.07.08 : Tokyo Romance - Cha-Dance Party Vol. 4
- 1992.12.02 : Catch Your Beat!! - Cha-Dance Party Vol. 5
- 1993.06.23 : Make It True - Cha-Dance Party Vol. 6
- 1993.11.10 : Sevn on Seven - Cha-Dance Party Vol. 7
- 1993.11.10 : TPD Dash !!: Dash!! - Cha-Dance Party Vol. 7.5 (mini-album)
- 1994.05.01 : TPD Dash !!: Just Fine - Cha-Dance Party Vol. 8
- 1994.08.01 : Never Stop - Cha-Dance Party Vol. 9
- 1995.03.08 : TPD Collection from The Early Cha-Dance Party - Cha-Dance Party Vol. 10 (best of)
- 1995.03.08 : TPD The Remix - Cha-Dance Party Vol. 11
- 1995.08.02 : check my heart - Cha-Dance Party Vol. 12
- 2017.01.18 : We Are TPD
- 2018.11.21 : Hey, Girls!
- 2020.11.18 : 20 TALES 20 BEATS

=== Mini-albums ===
- 2017.09.13 : Summer Glitter

=== Solo albums ===
- 1993.01.15 : Satomifrom Tokyo Performance Doll
- 1993.01.15 : Miho from Tokyo Performance Doll
- 1993.01.15 : Ryoko from Tokyo Performance Doll
- 1993.01.15 : Chisa from Tokyo Performance Doll
- 1993.01.15 : Yuri from Tokyo Performance Doll
- 1993.01.15 : Yuko from Tokyo Performance Doll
- 1993.01.15 : Mai from Tokyo Performance Doll
- 1994.12.01 : Yuko Anai - Sin

=== Singles ===
- 1991.07.01 : Wake Me Up!!
- 1992.04.08 : Yume wo
- 1992.06.21 : Houkago ha Itsumo Party
- 1992.10.21 : Catch!!
- 1992.11.21 : Juudai ni Tsumi wa Nai
- 1993.05.21 : Kiss wa Shounen wo Rouhi Suru
- 1993.11.10 : Diamond wa Kizutsuka Nai
- 1994.07.01 : Konya wa Never Stop (radio edit)
- 2014.06.11 : Brand New Story (Reached the 8th place on the weekly Oricon Singles Chart.)
- 2014.11.26 : Dream Trigger (reached the 4th place on the weekly Oricon Singles Chart.)
- 2015.06.10 : Dreamin'
- 2016.03.23 : Gyakkou × Raisan (逆光×礼賛 Backlight × Praise)
- 2016.08.17 : Junai Chaos (純愛カオス Pure Love Chaos)
- 2018.03.14 : Trick U
- 2018.06.06 : Shapeless
- 2019.06.12 : Super Duper

=== Digital singles ===
- 2017.12.06 : Genjou Daha de Love you (現状打破でLove you)
- 2020.06.11 : eyes
- 2020.11.04 : TALES

=== Videos and DVDs ===
- 1991.02.01 : Video Cha-Dance Vol. 0
- 1991.03.21 : Video Cha-Dance Vol. 1
- 1991.03.21 : Video Cha-Dance Vol. 2
- 1991.06.21 : Video Cha-Dance Vol. 3
- 1991.06.21 : Video Cha-Dance Vol. 4
- 1991.10.01 : Video Cha-Dance Vol. 5
- 1991.10.01 : Video Cha-Dance Vol. 6
- 1993.07.21 : Video Cha-Dance Vol. 7 Live at Tokyo Kousei Nenkin Kaikan 1993.4.6 (Live At 東京厚生年金会館)
- 1993.07.21 : Video Cha-Dance Vol. 8 Live at Tokyo Kousei Nenkin Kaikan 1993.4.6 (Live At 東京厚生年金会館)
- 1993.12.01 : That's the Revue 1 Live at Tokyo Kousei Nenkin Kaikan 1993.8.17 Part 1 + Encore Video Cha-Dance Vol. 9 (Live at 東京厚生年金会館 1993.8.17 第1部+アンコール)
- 1993.12.01 : That's the Revue 2 Live at Tokyo Kousei Nenkin Kaikan * 1993.8.17 Part 2 Video Cha-Dance Vol. 10 (Live at 東京厚生年金会館 1993.8.17 第2部)
- 1994.11.21 : That's the Revue 1994 Part1 Live at Yokohama Arena 1994.8.7 - Video Cha-Dance Vol. 11
- 1994.11.02 : That's the Revue 1994 Part2 Live at Yokohama Arena 1994.8.7 - Video Cha-Dance Vol. 12
- 1995.12.01 : Speed Per Hour 270 km - Video Cha-Dance Vol. 13
- 2003.12.03 : That's the Revue
- 2014.01.31 : Play×Live "1×0" Episode 1
- 2014.01.31 : Play×Live "1×0" Episode 2
- 2014.01.31 : Play×Live "1×0" Episode 3
- 2014.01.31 : Play×Live "1×0" Episode 4
- 2014.01.31 : Play×Live "1×0" Episode 5
- 2014.08.29 : "Tokyo Goukyuu Kyoushitsu ~ROAD TO 2020~" DVD-BOX vol. 1 (「東京号泣教室 ～Road to 2020～」DVD-Box vol. 1)
- 2014.12.23 : "Tokyo Goukyuu Kyoushitsu ~ROAD TO 2020~" DVD-BOX vol. 2 (「東京号泣教室 ～Road to 2020～」DVD-Box vol. 2)
- 2015.03.28 : Play×Live "1×0" New Version Episode 1
- 2015.03.28 : Play×Live "1×0" New Version Episode 2
- 2015.03.28 : Play×Live "1×0" New Version Episode 3
- 2015.03.28 : Play×Live "1×0" New Version Episode 4
- 2015.03.28 : Play×Live "1×0" New Version Episode 5
- 2015.07.01 : "Tokyo Goukyuu Kyoushitsu ~Road to 2020~" DVD-Box vol. 3 (「東京号泣教室 ～ROAD TO 2020～」DVD-Box vol. 3)
- 2015.07.01 : "Tokyo Goukyuu Kyoushitsu ~Road to 2020~" DVD-Box vol. 4 (「東京号泣教室 ～ROAD TO 2020～」DVD-Box vol. 4)
- 2015.11.18 : Tokyo Performance Doll Zepp Tour TOUR 2015 Haru~ Dance Summit "1×0" ver3.0~ (東京パフォーマンスドール Zepp Tour 2015春〜Dance Summit“1×0 (ワンバイゼロ)”ver3.0〜)
- 2016.04.08 : "Tokyo Goukyuu Kyoushitsu ~Road to 2020~" DVD-Box vol. 5 (「東京号泣教室 ～Road to 2020～」DVD-Box vol. 5)
- 2016.04.08 : "Tokyo Goukyuu Kyoushitsu ~Road to 2020~" DVD-Box vol. 6 (「東京号泣教室 ～Road to 2020～」DVD-Box vol. 6)
- 2017.08.02 : Dance Summit "DREAM CRUSADERS" ~Saikou no Kiseki wo, Saikyou no Family to Tomoni!~ at Nakano Sun Plaza 2017.3.26 (ダンスサミット“DREAM CRUSADERS”～最高の奇跡を、最強のファミリーとともに！～ at 中野サンプラザ 2017.3.26)

=== Books ===
- 1993.08 Tokyo Performance Doll Official Handbook (東京パフォーマンスドール オフィシャルハンドブック)
- 1995.03 TPD in the case
