= Shojō Sensō =

Shōjo Sensō
- DVD cover
- Directed by: Ataru Oikawa
- Written by: Ataru Oikawa
- Produced by: Yasuhiko Higashi
- Starring: Anna Ishibashi; Rina Kirishima; Yuki Minami
- Cinematography: Yasunori Nishi
- Edited by: Yasunori Nishi
- Production company: finefilms
- Release date: January 15, 2011 (Japan)
- Running time: 82 minutes
- Country: Japan
- Language: Japanese

Shōjo Sensō (Japanese: 少女戦争) is a 2011 Japanese film directed by Ataru Oikawa.

== Cast ==
- Anna Ishibashi
- Rina Kirishima
- Yuki Minami
