= East End X Yuri =

Japanese hip hop group

East End × Yuri
- Origin: Tokyo, Japan
- Genres: Hip Hop; J-rap
- Years active: 1994–1996
- Labels: File; Epic
- Past members: Gaku; Yuri; Yoggy; Rock-Tee

East End × Yuri (pronounced "East End Plus Yuri") is a Japanese hip hop group that was composed of East End and singer Yuri Ichii, ex-member of J-pop girl group Tokyo Performance Doll. They were the first Japanese hip-hop artists to have a single sell over a million copies in Japan, a feat achieved twice with the singles "DA.YO.NE" and "MAICCA". Their commercial success spread the genre to a wider audience, and as a result, hip-hop became more accepted in Japanese society.

== Biography ==
1994

In February, East End, friends of Tokyo Performance Doll's Yuri Ichii, appeared as guests at Ichii's live performance at Theater Apple in the basement of Shinjuku Koma Theater in Shinjuku, Tokyo. File Records' president Yoshio Sato, who was watching the performance, gave the nod to form "East End × Yuri".

In June, they released their debut mini album "Denim-ed Soul" and held a live concert to celebrate the release of the record at Space Lab Yellow in Nishi-Azabu, Tokyo.

In August, the first single "DA.YO.NE" from "Denim-ed Soul" was released by Epic Records Japan . Initial sales were poor but thanks to a strong push from NORTH WAVE and Tower Records Sapporo, "DA.YO.NE" became popular in Hokkaido. It then gained popularity in other regions such as Hiroshima, Kyushu, Sendai, and Kansai (cover versions of these songs were later released in these regions). It eventually sold a million copies, reaching a peak of third place. It was listed in the Guinness Book of World Records as the "highest-selling CD by a non-English rap artist".

1995

In February, the group released their second single, "MAICCA". It debuted at number three. It charted in the top ten along with "DA.YO.NE", and both were nominated for the New Words and Buzzwords Awards . At this point, Rock-Tee left the group due to differences in direction.

In April, the third single "Good Feeling, Bad Feeling" was released.

In June, they released their first full-length album and second album, "Denim-ed Soul 2". The group's combined sales exceeded 4 million copies.

In July, the 4th single "What's that?" was released from "Denim-ed Soul 2".

In December, the 5th single "Ne" was released. On New Year's Eve, they appeared at the 46th NHK Kōhaku Uta Gassen (the first hip-hop group to do so).

1996

In May, the 6th single "Sunday Morning Early Bird" was released. After that, the group ceased activities.

== Discography ==
Their first album Denim-ed Soul was released on File Records, and their other works were released on Epic Records Japan.

Singles

1. "DA.YO.NE" (Released August 21, 1994)

2. "MAICCA" (Released February 13, 1995)

3. "Good Feeling, Bad Feeling" (Released on April 21, 1995)

4. "What's that?" (Released July 21, 1995)

5. "Ne" (Released on December 1, 1995)

6. "Early Sunday Morning" (Released on May 22, 1996)
