= Ariko Inaoka =

Japanese photographer

Ariko Inaoka (Japanese: 稲岡亜里子, born Kyoto 1975) is a Japanese photographer, best known for her long-term project of photographing a pair of Icelandic twins. She is also the owner of Honke Owariya, a long-established soba restaurant in Kyoto.

== Youth ==
Born in Kyoto in 1975, Inaoka went to a high school in San Diego from 1992 and studied at Parsons School of Design from 1995, graduating in 1999. She started working at magazines and catalogs in Paris, London, and Japan, mainly in fashion photography. She moved back to Tokyo in 2006.

== Photography ==
Inaoka has worked as a fashion photographer. From 1998 to 2002 she worked on The Number after 10 with Claudia Hill In 2000, Photo District News named her one of the PDN/Kodak 30 under thirty. Her earlier work was done under the single name Ariko (in Roman letters). (Note: Sól (published 2006) is by Ariko; The Free Spirits of Christiania (published 2017) is by 稲岡亜里子 (i.e. Ariko Inaoka).)

Inaoka is known for her years-long photography of a pair of identical twins in Iceland, which she has called "the place for my creativity and inspiration." She first met Erna and Hrefna (Icelandic for "eagle" and "raven" respectively) in 2006, but only started photographing them in 2009, when they were nine. She was drawn to the twins as a subject because of their "telepathic" connection. The photography continued until 2017.

Other subjects Inaoka has photographed include landscapes and travelers.

== Restaurant ownership ==
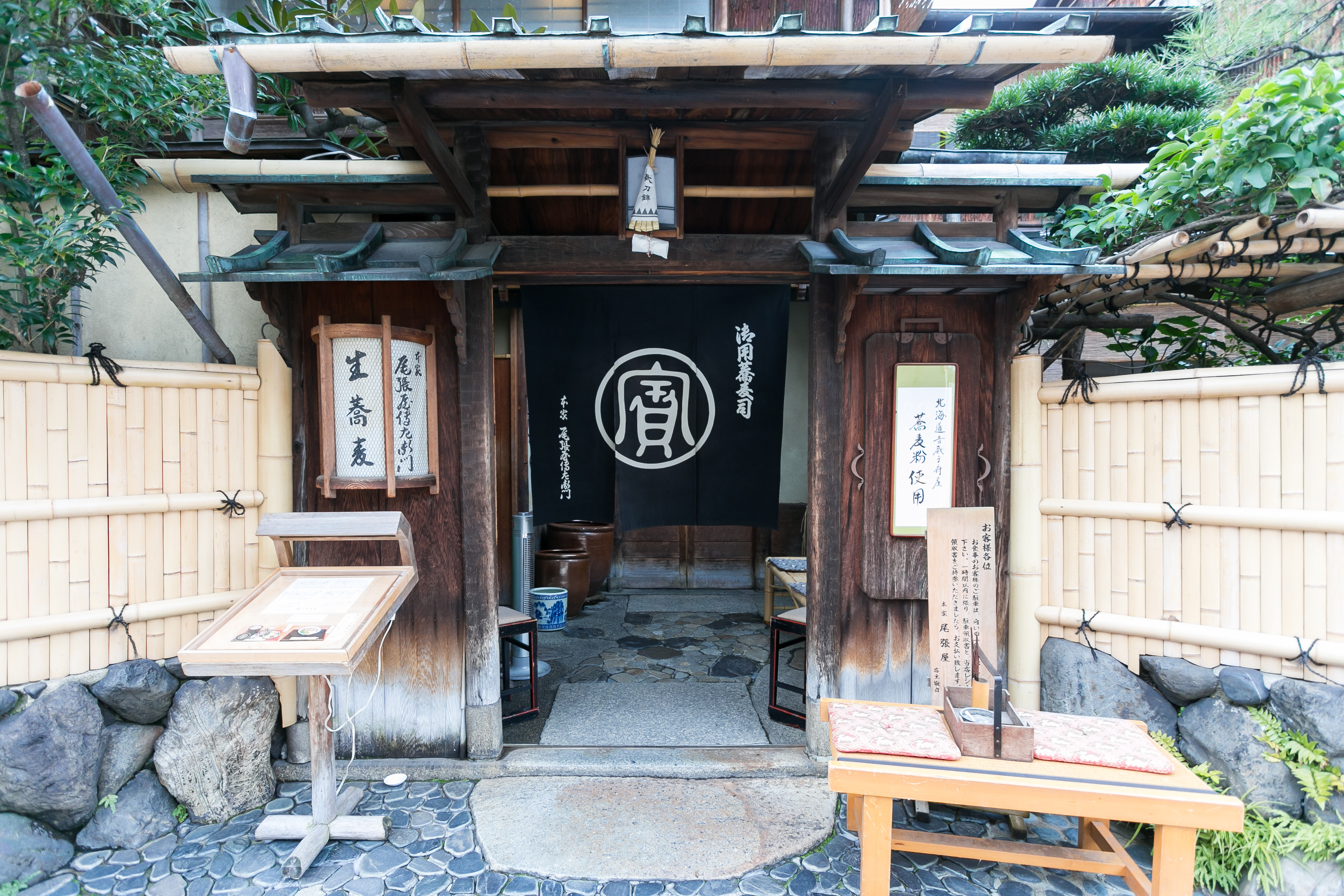
Entrance to the soba shop Honke Owariya

Inaoka returned to Kyoto in 2011. She is the current and sixteenth owner of Honke Owariya, founded in 1465 and the oldest soba restaurant in Kyoto and perhaps the whole of Japan. She follows this tradition from her father, the fifteenth owner, and her grandfather, the fourteenth.

== Exhibitions ==
- Sól. Trax gallery (Hokuto, Yamanashi), August–September 2008.
- Sól. Rocket Gallery (Jingūmae, Tokyo), February 2009.
- Om. Gallery Target (Jingūmae, Tokyo), April 2011.
- Opposite～異なる2つのインド = Opposite India. Slant gallery (Kanazawa), April–May 2011. With Yayoi Arimoto (在本彌生).
- One Plus One Is Three. 2013 Shin Kong Mitsukoshi International Photography Festival = 2013新光三越國際攝影聯展, Shin Kong Mitsukoshi (Taipei), 2013. With Sean Lotman.
- Erna and Hrefna. Revela't 2018 (El Festival Internacional de Fotografía Analógica de Vilassar de Dalt), Fábrica Cal Garbat, Vilassar de Dalt, 11–27 May 2018.
- Parallel Crossings. Ibasho Gallery (Antwerp), January–March 2020. (With Sean Lotman.)

== Books ==
- Key of Life: Hasegawa Kyoko Photobook. Tokyo: Pengin Shobō, 2003. ISBN 4-901978-09-8. Photographs of Kyōko Hasegawa by "Takey" or "Takay" (according to the impression) and "Ariko."
- Sól. Tokyo: Akaaka, 2008. ISBN 978-4-903545-27-1. By "Ariko."
- クリスチャニア自由の国に生きるデンマークの奇跡 (Kurisuchania: Jiyū no kuni ni ikiru Denmāku no kiseki) = The Free Spirits of Christiania. Tokyo: Wave, 2017. ISBN 978-4-86621-089-6. Text by Kana Shimizu (清水香那), photographs by Inaoka.
- Eagle and Raven. Tokyo: Akaaka, 2020. ISBN 978-4-86541-111-9. By Inaoka.
