= Yuri Ichii =

Japanese pop idol and rapper (born 1972)

Yuri Ichii (市井 由理, Ichii Yuri; born December 20, 1972) is a Japanese pop idol and rapper, best known for being a member in the breakthrough Japanese hip hop trio, East End X Yuri. She was also a singer with the revolving-door group Tokyo Performance Doll (TPD) alongside Ryoko Shinohara. She was part of TPD for a while but sought to do something different, deciding to try rap. Ichii began practicing her rapping in preparation for a solo show with her friend Gaku, who was a part of the group East End. In February 1994 when Gaku performed with Yuri for part of her show, she was seen by File Records (the independent record label that signed East End). They were impressed with her and decided to sign them together for a mini-album. Ichii is a pioneer for women in Japanese hip hop.

== History ==
Initially, as one of the members of East End, DJ Yoggy was skeptical of working with Ichii because he saw her only as a pop idol singer (as she was with TPD) and thought she would not be able to perform live. He later found out that she could perform quite well live and came around. In June 1994, East End X Yuri released the mini-album titled Denim-ed Soul on File Records with four songs. Together East End X Yuri became very successful and began to move up the pyramid of the music scene.

Ichii is often seen as a comfortable middle-class rap star and is not what one would consider a "gangsta" rapper. Her sweet-sixteen image often belies her mid-twenties age. In an interview with the Tokyo Journal, she states:

"If I looked more grown-up and sexier, I might use obscene words. But I don't think those words really fit me."

The popularity of East End X Yuri helped usher in a newly found mainstream acceptance for hip hop and hip hop culture. Due to the pop explosion of East End X Yuri, many popular Japanese rappers began embracing a more bubblegum, pop-friendly style, with most mainstream Japanese rappers finding success in writing non-threatening and non-offensive lyrics. In contrast, today, many rappers are also experiencing mainstream success, with artists like Hannya, Maria, Rappagariya, Ozrosaurus and Seeda on the forefront.
