= The Blood of Wolves =

- Film poster

Japanese name
- Kanji: 孤狼の血
- Directed by: Kazuya Shiraishi
- Screenplay by: Jun'ya Ikegami
- Based on: Korō no Chi by Yūko Yuzuki
- Produced by: Kazuto Amano
- Starring: Kōji Yakusho; Tori Matsuzaka; Yōko Maki
- Narrated by: Issei Futamata
- Edited by: Hitomi Katō
- Music by: Gorō Yasukawa
- Distributed by: Toei
- Release date: May 12, 2018
- Running time: 126 minutes
- Country: Japan
- Language: Japanese
- Box office: $5,908,700

The Blood of Wolves (Japanese: 孤狼の血, Hepburn: Korō no Chi) is a 2018 Japanese crime yakuza film directed by Kazuya Shiraishi, starring Koji Yakusho and Tori Matsuzaka. The 2021 film Last of The Wolves was released as a sequel to this film.

== Premise ==
1988, Hiroshima, Japan. Shūichi Hioka (Tori Matsuzaka) gets assigned to the second investigative unit under Shōgo Ōgami (Kōji Yakusho), a detective rumored to have mob ties, and he is put in charge of the missing person case for an employee at a yakuza-affiliated finance company. Hioka confronts ruthless gang thugs while harboring doubts about the law-breaking Ogami.

== Cast ==
East Kurehara Police

- Kōji Yakusho as Shōgo Ōgami
- Tori Matsuzaka as Shūichi Hioka
- Kenichi Yajima
- Tomorowo Taguchi

Hiroshima Prefectural Police

- Kenichi Takitō as Daisuke Saga

Odani-gumi

- Yōsuke Eguchi as Moritaka Ichinose
- Goro Ibuki as Kenji Odani
- Tomoya Nakamura as Kyōji
- Taketo Tanaka as Takashi

Irako-kai

- Renji Ishibashi as Shōhei Irako

Kakomura-gumi

- Kyūsaku Shimada as Kakomura
- Yutaka Takenouchi as Nozaki
- Takuma Otoo as Yoshida
- Katsuya as "Sekitori"

Takii-gumi

- Pierre Taki as Ginji Takii

Aki Shimbun

- Nakamura Shidō II as Takafumi Kōsaka

Others

- Yōko Maki as Rikako Takagi
- Junko Abe as Momoko Okada
- Taro Suruga as Jirō Uesawa
- Megumi as Junko Uesawa
- Joey Iwanaga as Daiki Zenda

== Accolades ==
| Award | Category | Nominee | Result |
|---|---|---|---|
| 43rd Hochi Film Awards | Best Picture | The Blood of Wolves | Won |
| 43rd Hochi Film Awards | Best Director | Kazuya Shiraishi | Nominated |
| 43rd Hochi Film Awards | Best Actor | Kōji Yakusho | Won |
| 43rd Hochi Film Awards | Best Supporting Actor | Tori Matsuzaka | Nominated |
| 43rd Hochi Film Awards | Best Supporting Actress | Yōko Maki | Nominated |
| 31st Nikkan Sports Film Awards | Best Film | The Blood of Wolves | Nominated |
| 31st Nikkan Sports Film Awards | Yūjirō Ishihara Award | The Blood of Wolves | Nominated |
| 31st Nikkan Sports Film Awards | Best Director | Kazuya Shiraishi | Won |
| 31st Nikkan Sports Film Awards | Best Actor | Kōji Yakusho | Nominated |
| 31st Nikkan Sports Film Awards | Best Supporting Actress | Yōko Maki | Nominated |
| 40th Yokohama Film Festival | Best Actor | Kōji Yakusho | Won |
| 40th Yokohama Film Festival | Best Supporting Actor | Tori Matsuzaka | Won |
| 73rd Mainichi Film Awards | Best Film | The Blood of Wolves | Nominated |
| 73rd Mainichi Film Awards | Best Director | Kazuya Shiraishi | Nominated |
| 73rd Mainichi Film Awards | Best Actor | Kōji Yakusho | Nominated |
| 73rd Mainichi Film Awards | Best Supporting Actor | Tori Matsuzaka | Nominated |
| 73rd Mainichi Film Awards | Best Sound Recording | Kazuharu Urata | Nominated |
| 92nd Kinema Junpo Awards | Best Supporting Actor | Tori Matsuzaka | Won |
| 61st Blue Ribbon Awards | Best Film | The Blood of Wolves | Nominated |
| 61st Blue Ribbon Awards | Best Director | Kazuya Shiraishi | Won |
| 61st Blue Ribbon Awards | Best Actor | Kōji Yakusho | Nominated |
| 61st Blue Ribbon Awards | Best Supporting Actor | Tori Matsuzaka | Won |
| 28th Tokyo Sports Film Award | Best Film | The Blood of Wolves | Nominated |
| 28th Tokyo Sports Film Award | Best Director | Kazuya Shiraishi | Nominated |
| 28th Tokyo Sports Film Award | Best Actor | Kōji Yakusho | Nominated |
| 28th Tokyo Sports Film Award | Best Supporting Actor | Tori Matsuzaka | Won |
| 28th Tokyo Sports Film Award | Best Supporting Actress | Yōko Maki | Nominated |
| 14th Osaka Cinema Festival | Best Film | The Blood of Wolves | Won |
| 14th Osaka Cinema Festival | Best Director | Kazuya Shiraishi | Won |
| 14th Osaka Cinema Festival | Best Actor | Kōji Yakusho | Won |
| 14th Osaka Cinema Festival | Best Supporting Actor | Tori Matsuzaka | Won |
| 14th Osaka Cinema Festival | Best Supporting Actress | Junko Abe | Won |
| 42nd Japan Academy Prize | Picture of the Year | The Blood of Wolves | Nominated |
| 42nd Japan Academy Prize | Best Director | Kazuya Shiraishi | Nominated |
| 42nd Japan Academy Prize | Best Actor | Kōji Yakusho | Won |
| 42nd Japan Academy Prize | Best Supporting Actor | Tori Matsuzaka | Won |
| 42nd Japan Academy Prize | Best Supporting Actress | Yōko Maki | Nominated |
| 42nd Japan Academy Prize | Best Screenplay | Jun'ya Ikegami | Nominated |
| 42nd Japan Academy Prize | Best Music | Gorō Yasukawa | Nominated |
| 42nd Japan Academy Prize | Best Cinematography | Takahiro Haibara | Nominated |
| 42nd Japan Academy Prize | Best Lighting Direction | Minoru Kawai | Nominated |
| 42nd Japan Academy Prize | Best Art Direction | Tsutomu Imamura | Won |
| 42nd Japan Academy Prize | Best Sound Recording | Kazuharu Urata | Won |
| 42nd Japan Academy Prize | Best Film Editing | Hitomi Katō | Nominated |
| 13th Asian Film Awards | Best Actor | Kōji Yakusho | Won |

== Sequel ==
- Last of the Wolves (2021)

== See also ==
- Cops vs. Thugs (1975 film)
