= One Cut of the Dead =

- Theatrical release poster
- Directed by: Shin'ichirō Ueda
- Screenplay by: Shin'ichirō Ueda
- Based on: Ghost in the Box! by Ryoichi Wada
- Produced by: Koji Ichihashi
- Starring: Takayuki Hamatsu; Yuzuki Akiyama; Kazuaki Nagaya; Harumi Syuhama; Manabu Hosoi; Hiroshi Ichihara; Shuntaro Yamazaki; Shinichiro Osawa
- Cinematography: Tsuyoshi Sone
- Edited by: Shin'ichirō Ueda
- Music by: Nobuhiro Suzuki; Kailu Nagai
- Production company: Enbu Seminar
- Distributed by: Asmik Ace
- Release date: 4 November 2017 (Japan)
- Running time: 97 minutes
- Country: Japan
- Language: Japanese
- Budget: ¥3 million ($25,000)
- Box office: ¥3.12 billion (Japan) $31.2 million (worldwide)

One Cut of the Dead (Japanese: カメラを止めるな!, Hepburn: Kamera o Tomeru na!; transl. Don't Stop the Camera!) is a 2017 Japanese independent satirical zombie comedy film written and directed by Shin'ichirō Ueda. Based primarily on the stage play Ghost in the Box! by Ryoichi Wada, it follows a film crew who are tasked with making One Cut of the Dead, a zombie horror film for live television that must be shot in a single take; the film initially depicts One Cut of the Dead as a film within the film, then goes back in time to show the origins and production of the project from the perspective of the cast and crew.

Made with a low budget of ¥3 million ($25,000) with a cast of unknown actors, One Cut of the Dead opened in a small cinema in Japan for a six-day run. Following its international success upon its screening at the Udine Film Festival, the film received a wide release, including a re-release in Japan.

The film grossed $27.93 million (¥3.12 billion) in Japan and $30.5 million worldwide, making box office history by earning over 1,000 times its budget. It received acclaim from critics, who praised its originality, writing, and humor. It was ranked by Rotten Tomatoes as the best found footage film ever made, and is the only found footage film to have received a rating of 100% on Rotten Tomatoes as of July 2025.

== Plot ==
In the first section of the film, the cast and crew of a low-budget zombie film called True Fear are shooting at an abandoned water filtration plant. Director Higurashi, desperate for film success due to mounting debts and frustrated at the actors' work, arranges for a blood pentagram to be painted to revive real zombies per the plant's haunted past. The cameraman turns into a zombie and bites assistant director Kasahara, turning him into one as well. Actress Chinatsu, actor Ko, and makeup artist Nao lock the zombies out of the plant. Higurashi insists they continue filming using the real zombies. The sound engineer rushes out of the plant and is infected. Higurashi brings the zombified sound engineer back in for more footage, throwing him at the actors. Nao decapitates the zombified sound engineer and is splattered with zombie blood.

Chinatsu, Ko, and Nao attempt to escape, but Higurashi facilitates an attack by zombified Kasahara while he films. Chinatsu is confronted by the zombies and saved by Ko. They reunite with Nao, who suspects that Chinatsu is infected. Nao attempts to kill Chinatsu and chases her, dispatching the zombies in the process. Chinatsu escapes to a roof, with Nao and Ko following. Offscreen, Ko kills Nao with an axe to save Chinatsu. Chinatsu thinks she is infected and runs away to a building with a pentagram painted on the outside wall. An unidentified zombie approaches Chinatsu and leaves. Chinatsu also exits the building, finding an axe before seeing Ko wandering on the roof. She approaches Ko to find that he has been zombified. Chinatsu confronts zombified Ko in a scene similar to the start of the film, and after being briefly interrupted by a mysteriously revived Nao, Chinatsu decapitates zombified Ko. Higurashi berates Chinatsu for going off script. Chinatsu kills Higurashi, and she ends the first section by standing on the blood pentagram in a trance-like state.

The second section of the film is a flashback involving the personal lives of the fictional cast and crew of a production called One Cut of the Dead, a film-within-the-film of the same title (thus making True Fear a film-within-the-film within another film-within-the-film). Takayuki Higurashi, director of a TV drama starring alcoholic actor Manabu Hosoda, is approached by network executives to direct a low-budget zombie film in one take to launch the new Zombie Channel. He is initially reluctant, but accepts in hopes of reconnecting with his daughter Mao, a horror movie fanatic. Actors cast for One Cut of the Dead include idol Aika Matsumoto as Chinatsu, cynical actor Kazuaki Kamiya as Ko, Shunsuke Yamagoe as the sound engineer, and Hosoda as the cameraman. The One Cut of the Dead movie-within-the-movie is also revealed to be a live show, so no reshoots or delays are possible.

The third section of the film depicts the chaotic shooting of One Cut of the Dead from behind the scenes. The actors cast as director and makeup artist could not make filming, forcing Takayuki and his wife Harumi to step in to fill their respective roles. During the shooting, Takayuki overacts his first scene by physically accosting Matsumoto. Hosoda passes out drunk and later vomits. Yamagoe's diarrhea leads to his character leaving the plant off-script. Dealing with these forces Takayuki and the other actors to start to improvise and make small talk. The main cameraman suffers a back injury and has to be replaced. Harumi goes off-script and attacks various real cast and crew during the scene of Nao chasing Chinatsu, forcing Takayuki to choke her out and later forcibly remove her from interrupting the ending scene between Chinatsu and Ko after she abruptly wakes up. The zombie who did not attack Chinatsu turns out to be a crew member giving instructions. The camera crane accidentally gets broken, forcing the real cast and crew to form a human pyramid in order to mimic a crane shot for the final shot, with Mao having to hold the camera standing atop Takayuki's shoulders. The faux-crane shot is successful, and the real cast and crew are elated at the successful filming.

The final credits are shown over footage of the real-life filming by the One Cut of the Dead crew, including the faux-crane shot being taken from the top of a stepladder.

== Cast ==
- Takayuki Hamatsu as Takayuki Higurashi
- Yuzuki Akiyama as Aika Matsumoto / Chinatsu
- Kazuaki Nagaya as Kazuaki Kamiya / Ko / Ken
- Harumi Shuhama as Harumi Higurashi / Nao
- Manabu Hosoi as Manabu Hosoda
- Hiroshi Ichihara as Hiroshi Yamanouchi
- Shuntaro Yamazaki as Shunsuke Yamagoe
- Shinichiro Osawa as Shinichiro Furusawa
- Yoshiko Takehara (Donguri) as Yoshiko Sasahara
- Sakina Asamori as Saki Matsuura
- Miki Yoshida as Miki Yoshino
- Ayana Goda as Ayana Kurihara
- Mao as Mao Higurashi

== Production ==
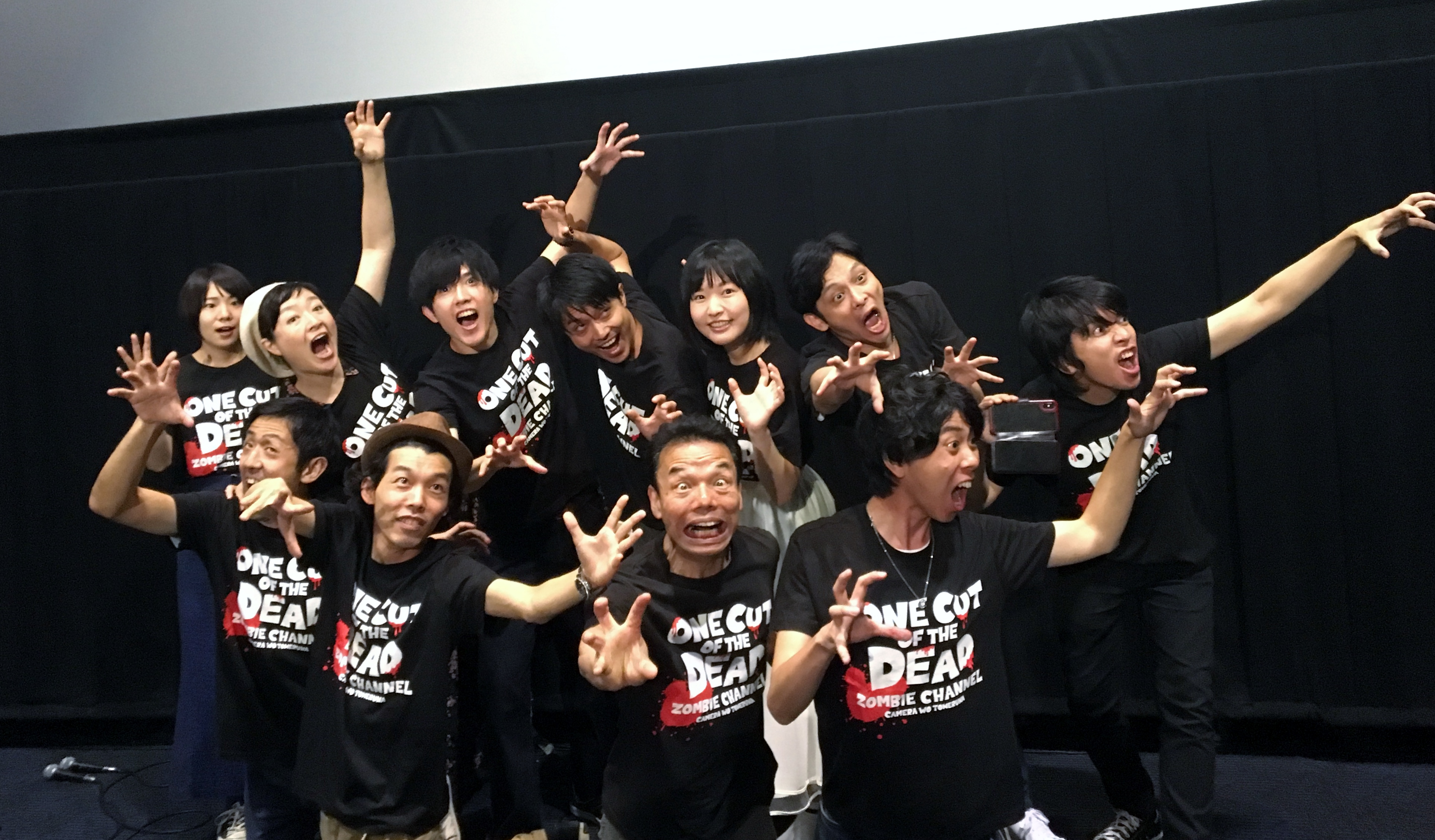
The cast and director of One Cut of the Dead in July 2018

Filmmaker Shin'ichirō Ueda directed, edited, and wrote the script for One Cut of the Dead. An independent filmmaker, Ueda had previously made several short films. The film was largely based on the stage play Ghost in the Box! by Ryoichi Wada, which Ueda had seen five years prior. Wada, a playwright and theater director, presented Ghost in the Box! from 2011 to 2014.

To make his film, Ueda worked with the Enbu Seminar drama school in Tokyo. Enbu Seminar not only produced the film, but also hosted the acting workshops that Ueda used to help cast its actors, most of them unknowns. According to actress Yuzuki Akiyama, the workshop lasted for two months. She had previously worked with Ueda on his 2011 short film, Dreaming Novelist.

Filming for One Cut of the Dead took place over the course of eight days in June 2017. It was shot at an abandoned water filtration plant in Mito, Ibaraki. Akiyama described the filming process as "very enjoyable but also pretty exhausting" due to the pressure to get a long take right. One long take in particular, a 37-minute-long continuous shot of the zombie film, took six takes.

One Cut of the Dead was made for ¥3 million (approximately $25,000 at the time), and was partially crowdfunded. After the eight days of shooting, it took four months for Ueda to edit the film.

== Release ==
Producer and Enbu Seminar president Koji Ichihashi said that the initial target for the film to break even was 5,000 admissions. One Cut of the Dead opened in Japan in an 84-seat Tokyo art house theater with an initial theatrical run of six days. The film began garnering international attention after it became the runner-up in the audience vote at the Udine Far East Film Festival. Of the films screening at Udine, it received a standing ovation and the Audience Award at the Udine Far East Film Festival in year 2018.

After receiving positive reviews outside of Japan, the film was released in three cinemas in Tokyo in June with discounts for an audience in zombie costumes to help the film gain attention. Asmik Ace stepped in to co-distribute the film, giving it a wider release in July. It was showing at around 200 screens in Japan by March 2018 where it had officially grossed ¥800 million.

== Reception ==
=== Box office ===
In Japan, the film sold 2,149,449 tickets and grossed ¥3,040,246,069 in 136 days. It became the seventh highest-grossing domestic film of 2018, grossing ¥3.12 billion ($28.3 million) at the Japanese box office. It made box office history by earning over a thousand times its budget.

Overseas, the film grossed NT$53 million (US$1.9 million) in Taiwan, HK$7.06 million (US$908,623) in Hong Kong, $154,123 in South Korea, $52,406 in the United States and Canada, and $2,903 in Iceland, for a worldwide total of $31,178,962.

=== Critical reception ===
On Rotten Tomatoes, the film holds a 100% approval rating based on 99 reviews, with an average rating of 8.6/10. The site's critical consensus states, "Brainy and bloody in equal measure, One Cut of the Dead reanimates the moribund zombie genre with a refreshing blend of formal daring and clever satire." Metacritic reports an 86 out of 100 score, based on 14 reviews.

Writing for Variety, Richard Kuipers declared the film to be a "marvelously inventive horror-comedy [that] breathes new life into the zombie genre", and attributed its success to "its irresistibly bouncy spirit [...] it positively sparkles with the infectious "C'mon everyone, let's put on a show!" enthusiasm that’s served the movies so well since the days of Andy Hardy". Elizabeth Kerr of The Hollywood Reporter found the film to be "a breezy and often laugh-out-loud hilarious zombie comedy", noting that although the film "sags in the second act as it sets up the third, it's not so much that it loses all the steam it generated out of the gate". David Ehrlich of IndieWire opined that the film was "so heartfelt and hilarious that it's easy to forgive the contrivances that hold it together, and to overlook how transparently Ueda reverse-engineers most of his best gags. Seemingly unimportant details in the film's sluggish middle section blossom into killer jokes some 30 minutes later".

=== Alleged plagiarism ===
In August 2018, Ryoichi Wada gave an interview in which he stated that One Cut of the Dead was an adaptation of Ghost in the Box, and that he was consulting with his legal representatives. The month before, Wada had remarked on social media that he enjoyed the film. Ueda acknowledged that Ghost in the Box was an inspiration for his film, but denied that he plagiarized the play. Both Ueda and Wada eventually came to an agreement, crediting Wada and acknowledging Ghost in the Box in One Cut of the Dead's credits.

=== Awards ===
Award	Category	Nominee	Result
43rd Hochi Film Awards	Best Picture	One Cut of the Dead	Nominated
43rd Hochi Film Awards	Special Award	One Cut of the Dead	Won
43rd Hochi Film Awards	Best Director	Shinichiro Ueda	Nominated
43rd Hochi Film Awards	Best New Artist	Shinichiro Ueda	Nominated
31st Nikkan Sports Film Awards	Best Film	One Cut of the Dead	Nominated
31st Nikkan Sports Film Awards	Yūjirō Ishihara Award	One Cut of the Dead	Won
31st Nikkan Sports Film Awards	Best Director	Shinichiro Ueda	Nominated
31st Nikkan Sports Film Awards	Best Newcomer	Shinichiro Ueda	Nominated
40th Yokohama Film Festival	Special Jury Prize	One Cut of the Dead	Won
73rd Mainichi Film Awards	Best Director	Shinichiro Ueda	Won
73rd Mainichi Film Awards	Best Screenplay	Shinichiro Ueda	Nominated
61st Blue Ribbon Awards	Best Film	One Cut of the Dead	Won
61st Blue Ribbon Awards	Best Director	Shinichiro Ueda	Nominated
28th Tokyo Sports Film Awards	Best Film	One Cut of the Dead	Nominated
28th Tokyo Sports Film Awards	Best Director	Shinichiro Ueda	Won
28th Tokyo Sports Film Awards	Best Actor	Takayuki Hamatsu	Nominated
28th Tokyo Sports Film Awards	Best Supporting Actress	Harumi Shuhama	Nominated
28th Tokyo Sports Film Awards	Best Newcomer	Harumi Shuhama	Won
42nd Japan Academy Prize	Picture of the Year	One Cut of the Dead	Nominated
42nd Japan Academy Prize	Best Director	Shinichiro Ueda	Nominated
42nd Japan Academy Prize	Best Actor	Takayuki Hamatsu	Nominated
42nd Japan Academy Prize	Best Screenplay	Shinichiro Ueda	Nominated
42nd Japan Academy Prize	Best Music	Nobuhiro Suzuki, Shōma Itō, and Kyle Nagai	Nominated
42nd Japan Academy Prize	Best Cinematography	Takeshi Sone	Nominated
42nd Japan Academy Prize	Best Sound Recording	Kōkichi Komoda	Nominated
42nd Japan Academy Prize	Best Film Editing	Shinichiro Ueda	Won
13th Asian Film Awards	Best New Director	Shinichiro Ueda	Nominated

== Sequels ==
One Cut of the Dead Spin-Off: In Hollywood (カメラを止めるな！スピンオフ ハリウッド大作戦！, Kamera o Tomeru na! Supin-ofu: Hariuddo daisakusen!, transl. "Don't Stop the Camera! Spin-Off : World-Wide") is a 59-minute feature that was made in 2019 for TV in Japan. Instead of Takayuki Higurashi, this film is about how his daughter Mao Higurashi makes a film just like he did in One Cut of the Dead.

During the 2020 COVID-19 pandemic in Japan, Ueda decided to create a short film One Cut of the Dead Mission: Remote (カメラを止めるな！リモート大作戦！, Kamera o Tomeru na! Rimōto dai sakusen!, transl. "Don't Stop the Camera! Remote Operation!") that would act as a sequel to One Cut of the Dead. The filmmaker wanted to create something that would lighten the mood during the pandemic, stating, "I started to wonder if there was anything positive I could do to try to put a smile on people’s faces through some light form of entertainment." After contacting the actors to confirm they would be able to reprise their role, Ueda wrote the script in one night, and gave the actors instructions via video conference. The actors were instructed to take selfie footage while in-character, then send the footage to the director via a smartphone messaging app. In addition, Ueda asked people on social media to upload video of themselves dancing to include in the movie.

The overall production of One Cut of the Dead Mission: Remote took place in around a month. It was uploaded to YouTube for people to watch for free on 1 May 2020.

== Remake ==
A French-language remake titled Final Cut, directed by Michel Hazanavicius and starring Romain Duris and Bérénice Bejo, began its production in April 2021. It was shown as the opening film at the 2022 Cannes Film Festival.

A Vietnamese-language remake titled Đại tiệc trăng máu 8 (Blood Moon Rite 8), starring Vân Sơn, Lê Khánh, Liên Bỉnh Phát, Miu Lê, was released on 24 April 2026.

== See also ==
- Everybody Dies by the End
- Dead Set
- Noises Off
