= Last of the Wolves =

- Film poster

Japanese name
- Kanji: 孤狼の血 LEVEL2
- Directed by: Kazuya Shiraishi
- Screenplay by: Jun'ya Ikegami
- Based on: Korō no Chi by Yūko Yuzuki
- Produced by: Kazuto Amano
- Starring: Tori Matsuzaka; Ryohei Suzuki; Nijirō Murakami; Nanase Nishino
- Cinematography: Kōhei Katō
- Edited by: Hitomi Katō
- Music by: Gorō Yasukawa
- Distributed by: Toei
- Release date: August 20, 2021
- Running time: 139 minutes
- Country: Japan
- Language: Japanese

Last of the Wolves (Japanese: 孤狼の血 LEVEL2, Hepburn: Korō no Chi Level 2) is a 2021 Japanese crime yakuza thriller film directed by Kazuya Shiraishi, starring Tori Matsuzaka and Ryohei Suzuki. It is a sequel to the 2018 film The Blood of Wolves.

== Premise ==
In the early 1990s, a young detective Shūichi Hioka controls the yakuza in Hiroshima, but the situation completely changes when Shigehiro Uebayashi is released from prison.

== Cast ==
- Tori Matsuzaka as Shūichi Hioka
- Ryohei Suzuki as Shigehiro Uebayashi
- Nijirō Murakami as Kōta "Chinta" Chikada
- Nanase Nishino as Mao Chikada
- Takuma Otoo as Shigeru Yoshida
- Taichi Saotome as Masaru Hanada
- Kiyohiko Shibukawa as Yukio Amagi
- Katsuya Maiguma as Masatoshi Saeki
- Miwako Kakei as Chiaki Kanbara
- Sho Aoyagi as Ken'ichi Kanbara
- Kenichi Yajima as Keiji Tomotake
- Hiroki Miyake as Satoru Nakagami
- Yoshiko Miyazaki as Yuriko Seshima
- Ryuji Sainei as Kikuchi
- Ryūji Bando
- Yumiko Udo
- Rairu Sugita
- Issei Okihara as Arihara
- Urara Anryū as Kakutani's wife
- Motohiro Oguri as Tokura
- Takumi Saitoh as Yūma Tachibana
- Nakamura Baijaku II as Takayuki Seshima
- Kenichi Takitō as Daisuke Saga
- Susumu Terajima as Yōji Kakutani
- Takashi Ukaji as Akira Mizoguchi
- Rino Katase as Tamaki Irako
- Nakamura Shidō II as Takafumi Kōsaka
- Kōtarō Yoshida as Yōzō Watafune

== Accolades ==
Award	Category	Nominee	Result
46th Hochi Film Awards	Best Picture	Last of the Wolves	Nominated
46th Hochi Film Awards	Best Director	Kazuya Shiraishi	Nominated
46th Hochi Film Awards	Best Actor	Tori Matsuzaka	Nominated
46th Hochi Film Awards	Best Supporting Actor	Ryohei Suzuki	Won
46th Hochi Film Awards	Best Supporting Actress	Nanase Nishino	Nominated
34th Nikkan Sports Film Awards	Best Film	Last of the Wolves	Nominated
34th Nikkan Sports Film Awards	Best Actor	Tori Matsuzaka	Nominated
34th Nikkan Sports Film Awards	Best Supporting Actor	Ryohei Suzuki	Won
43rd Yokohama Film Festival	Best Actor	Tori Matsuzaka	Won
43rd Yokohama Film Festival	Best Supporting Actor	Ryohei Suzuki	Won
76th Mainichi Film Awards	Best Supporting Actor	Ryohei Suzuki	Nominated
76th Mainichi Film Awards	Best Supporting Actor	Nijiro Murakami	Nominated
76th Mainichi Film Awards	Best Art Direction	Tsutomu Imamura	Nominated
76th Mainichi Film Awards	Best Sound Recording	Kazuharu Urata	Won
95th Kinema Junpo Awards	Best Supporting Actor	Ryohei Suzuki	Won
17th Osaka Cinema Festival	Best Supporting Actor	Ryohei Suzuki	Won
64th Blue Ribbon Awards	Best Film	Last of the Wolves	Won
64th Blue Ribbon Awards	Best Director	Kazuya Shiraishi	Nominated
64th Blue Ribbon Awards	Best Actor	Tori Matsuzaka	Nominated
64th Blue Ribbon Awards	Best Supporting Actor	Ryohei Suzuki	Nominated
45th Japan Academy Film Prize	Picture of the Year	Last of the Wolves	Nominated
45th Japan Academy Film Prize	Best Director	Kazuya Shiraishi	Nominated
45th Japan Academy Film Prize	Best Actor	Tori Matsuzaka	Nominated
45th Japan Academy Film Prize	Best Supporting Actor	Ryohei Suzuki	Won
45th Japan Academy Film Prize	Best Supporting Actor	Nijiro Murakami	Nominated
45th Japan Academy Film Prize	Best Supporting Actress	Nanase Nishino	Nominated
45th Japan Academy Film Prize	Best Screenplay	Jun'ya Ikegami	Nominated
45th Japan Academy Film Prize	Best Music	Gorō Yasukawa	Nominated
45th Japan Academy Film Prize	Best Cinematography	Kohei Kato	Nominated
45th Japan Academy Film Prize	Best Lighting Direction	Minoru Kawai	Nominated
45th Japan Academy Film Prize	Best Art Direction	Tsutomu Imamura	Nominated
45th Japan Academy Film Prize	Best Sound Recording	Kazuharu Urata	Nominated
45th Japan Academy Film Prize	Best Film Editing	Hitomi Katō	Nominated
45th Japan Academy Film Prize	Newcomer of the Year	Nanase Nishino	Won
31st Japan Movie Critics Awards	Best Supporting Actor	Ryohei Suzuki	Won
75th MPTE- Imaging Technology Awards	Best Cinematography	Kohei Kato	Won
75th MPTE- Imaging Technology Awards	Best Lighting Direction	Minoru Kawai	Won
