= Tokyo Sports Film Award for Best Supporting Actor =

Japanese film award

- Awarded for: Best Performance by a Supporting Actor
- Country: Japan
- Presented by: Tokyo Sports
- First award: 1991
- Website: www.tokyo-sports.co.jp/tospo_movie/

The Tokyo Sports Film Award for Best Supporting Actor is an award given at the Tokyo Sports Film Award. This award is not only given to a person, but also a film character such as Mothra in 1992.

== List of winners ==
No.	Year	Actor(s)	Film(s)
1	1991	N/A	N/A
2	1992	Mothra; Keiko Matsuzaka's father NHK special TV crew who played mountain sickness enthusiastically.	
3	1993	George Tokoro	
4	1994	Kazuaki Nishida	
5	1995	Kazuya Kimura	
6	1996	Morooka Moro	
7	1997	Akihiro Miwa	
8	1998	Ren Osugi	
9	1999	Masa Tomīzu	
10	2000	Takeshi Kitano	Battle Royale
11	2001	Susumu Terajima	
12	2002	Nenji Kobayashi	
13	2003	Ittoku Kishibe	Zatōichi; Get Up!
14	2004	Joe Odagiri	Blood and Bones
15	2005	Susumu Terajima	Shissō; Takeshis'
16	2006	Teruyuki Kagawa	Sway
17	2007	Bokuzō Masana	I Just Didn't Do It
18	2008	Tsutomu Yamazaki	Departures; Climber's High
19	2009	Tomokazu Miura	Shizumanu Taiyō
20	2010	Renji Ishibashi	Outrage; Kondo wa Aisaika
20	2010	Kippei Shiina	Outrage
21	2011	Denden	Cold Fish
22	2012	N/A	N/A
23	2013	Lily Franky	Like Father, Like Son; The Devil's Path
24	2014	Susumu Terajima	In The Hero
25	2015	Masaomi Kondō, Akira Nakao, Toru Shinagawa, Ben Hiura, Kōjun Itō, Ken Yoshizawa, Akira Onodera, Ken Yasuda	Ryuzo and the Seven Henchmen
26	2016	Gō Ayano	Rage
26	2016	Masaki Suda	Destruction Babies
27	2017	Ren Osugi, Nao Ōmori, Pierre Taki, Yutaka Matsushige, Tokio Kaneda	Outrage Coda
28	2018	Tori Matsuzaka	The Blood of Wolves
