= Tokyo Sports Film Award for Best Director =

Cinema award in Japan

- Awarded for: Best Performance by a Director
- Country: Japan
- Presented by: Tokyo Sports
- First award: 1991
- Website: www.tokyo-sports.co.jp/tospo_movie/

The Tokyo Sports Film Award for Best Director is an award given at the Tokyo Sports Film Award.

== List of winners ==
No.	Year	Director	Film
1	1991	Takeshi Kitano	
2	1992	Shigeo Nagashima	
3	1993	Yoichi Sai	
4	1994	N/A	
5	1995	Makoto Shinozaki	
6	1996	Takeshi Kitano	
7	1997	Hayao Miyazaki	
8	1998	Takeshi Kitano	
9	1999	Nagisa Oshima	
10	2000	Kinji Fukasaku	Battle Royale
11	2001	Isao Yukisada	
12	2002	N/A	N/A
13	2003	Takeshi Kitano	Zatōichi
14	2004	Yoichi Sai	Blood and Bones
15	2005	N/A	N/A
16	2006	Miwa Nishikawa	Sway
17	2007	Masayuki Suo	I Just Didn't Do It
18	2008	Takeshi Kitano	Achilles and the Tortoise
19	2009	Miwa Nishikawa	Dear Doctor
20	2010	Takeshi Kitano	Outrage
21	2011	Sion Sono	Cold Fish
22	2012	Takeshi Kitano	Beyond Outrage
23	2013	Hirokazu Koreeda	Like Father, Like Son
24	2014	Mipo O	The Light Shines Only There
25	2015	Hirokazu Koreeda	Our Little Sister
26	2016	Hideaki Anno and Shinji Higuchi	Shin Godzilla
27	2017	Takeshi Kitano	Outrage Coda
28	2018	Shinichiro Ueda	One Cut of the Dead
