= Blue Ribbon Award for Best Supporting Actor =

Annual Japanese film award

- Awarded for: Best Performance by a Supporting Actor
- Country: Japan
- Presented by: The Association of Tokyo Film Journalists
- First award: 1951

The Blue Ribbon Award for Best Supporting Actor is as part of its annual Blue Ribbon Awards for Japanese film, to recognize a male supporting actor who has delivered an outstanding performance.

== List of winners ==
| No. | Year | Recipient | Film(s) |
|---|---|---|---|
| 1 | 1950 | N/A | N/A |
| 2 | 1951 | Chishū Ryū | Wagaya wa Tanoshi; Inochi Utsukushiwashi |
| 3 | 1952 | Daisuke Katō | Vendetta for a Samurai; Mother |
| 4 | 1953 | Eitarō Shindō | Life of a Woman; A Geisha |
| 5 | 1954 | Eijirō Tōno | Kuroi Shio; Kunshō |
| 6 | 1955 | Daisuke Katō | Bloody Spear at Mount Fuji; Koko ni Izumi Ari |
| 7 | 1956 | Jun Tatara | Tsuruhachi Tsurujiro; Anata Kaimasu; Taifū Sōdōki |
| 8 | 1957 | Kōji Mitsui | Kichigai Buraku; The Lower Depths |
| 9 | 1958 | Nakamura Ganjirō II | Enjō; Iwashigumo |
| 10 | 1959 | Shoichi Ozawa | My Second Brother |
| 11 | 1960 | Masao Oda | The River Fuefuki; Bokutō Kigan |
| 12 | 1961 | So Yamamura | Are ga Minato no Hi da Kakō |
| 13 | 1962 | Yūnosuke Itō | Shinobi no Mono |
| 14 | 1963 | Chōichirō Kawarasaki | Gobanchō Yūgirirō |
| 15 | 1964 | Kō Nishimura | Unholy Desire |
| 16 | 1965 | Takahiro Tamura | The Hoodlum Soldier |
| 17 | 1966 | Katsuo Nakamura | Lake of Tears |
| 18 | 1975 | Yoshio Harada | Matsuri no Junbi; Pastoral: To Die in the Country |
| 19 | 1976 | Hideji Ōtaki | Fumō Chitai; Brother and Sister |
| 20 | 1977 | Tomisaburo Wakayama | Sugata Sanshirō; Akuma no Temariuta |
| 21 | 1978 | Tsunehiko Watase | The Incident |
| 22 | 1979 | Rentarō Mikuni | Vengeance Is Mine |
| 23 | 1980 | Tetsurō Tamba | The Battle of Port Arthur |
| 24 | 1981 | Masahiko Tsugawa | Manon |
| 25 | 1982 | Akira Emoto | Hearts and Flowers for Tora-san; Dotonbori River |
| 26 | 1983 | Kunie Tanaka | Nogare no Machi; Izakaya Chōji |
| 27 | 1984 | Kaku Takashina | Mahjong hōrōki |
| 28 | 1985 | Takeshi Kitano | Yasha |
| 29 | 1986 | Kei Suma | Final Take |
| 30 | 1987 | Toshiro Mifune | Tora-san Goes North |
| 31 | 1988 | Tsurutaro Kataoka | The Discarnates |
| 32 | 1989 | Eiji Bandō | Buddies |
| 33 | 1990 | Toshirō Yanagiba | Saraba Itoshino Yakuza |
| 34 | 1991 | Masatoshi Nagase | My Sons |
| 35 | 1992 | Hideo Murota | Shura no Densetsu; Original Sin |
| 36 | 1993 | George Tokoro | Madadayo |
| 37 | 1994 | Atsuo Nakamura | Shūdan Sasen |
| 38 | 1995 | Masato Hagiwara | Marks no Yama |
| 39 | 1996 | Tetsuya Watari | Waga Kokoro no Ginga Tetsudō Miyazawa kenji Monogatari |
| 40 | 1997 | Masahiko Nishimura | Marutai no Onna; Welcome Back, Mr. McDonald |
| 41 | 1998 | Ren Osugi | Hana-bi |
| 42 | 1999 | Shinji Takeda | Gohatto |
| 43 | 2000 | Teruyuki Kagawa | Suri; Dokuritsu Shōnen Gasshōdan |
| 44 | 2001 | Tsutomu Yamazaki | Go |
| 45 | 2002 | Kanji Tsuda | Mohōhan |
| 46 | 2003 | Tarō Yamamoto | Moon Child; Get Up! The Boat to Heaven |
| 47 | 2004 | Joe Odagiri | Blood and Bones; Kono Yo no Soto e Club Shinchūgun |
| 48 | 2005 | Shinichi Tsutsumi | Always Sanchōme no Yūhi; Fly, Daddy, Fly |
| 49 | 2006 | Teruyuki Kagawa | Sway; Deguchi no Nai Umi; Memories of Tomorrow |
| 50 | 2007 | Tomokazu Miura | The Matsugane Potshot Affair; Adrift in Tokyo |
| 51 | 2008 | Masato Sakai | After School; Climber's High |
| 52 | 2009 | Eita | Dear Doctor; Gama no Abura; Nakumonka; Nodame Cantabile Saishū Gakushō |
| 53 | 2010 | Renji Ishibashi | Outrage; Kondo wa Aisaika |
| 54 | 2011 | Yūsuke Iseya | Ashita no Joe; Kaiji |
| 55 | 2012 | Arata Iura | Our Homeland |
| 56 | 2013 | Pierre Taki | The Devil's Path; Kujikenaide; Like Father, Like Son |
| 57 | 2014 | Sosuke Ikematsu | Pale Moon; Umi o Kanjiru Toki; Bokutachi no Kazoku |
| 58 | 2015 | Masahiro Motoki | The Emperor in August; The Big Bee |
| 59 | 2016 | Lily Franky | Scoop! Satoshi: A Move for Tomorrow |
| 60 | 2017 | Yūsuke Santamaria | Wilderness |
| 61 | 2018 | Tori Matsuzaka | The Blood of Wolves |
| 62 | 2019 | Ryo Yoshizawa | Kingdom |
| 63 | 2020 | Ryo Narita | The Cornered Mouse Dreams of Cheese; Threads: Our Tapestry of Love |
| 64 | 2021 | Taiga Nakano | Under the Open Sky; Onoda: 10,000 Nights in the Jungle; In Those Days |
| 65 | 2022 | Kazuki Iio | Silent Parade |
| 66 | 2023 | Kōichi Satō | One Last Bloom and others |
| 67 | 2024 | Takao Osawa | Kingdom 4: Return of the Great General |
| 68 | 2025 | Jiro Sato | Suzuki=Bakudan |
