= Outrage Coda =

2017 film directed by Takeshi Kitano

- Japanese theatrical release poster
- Directed by: Takeshi Kitano
- Written by: Takeshi Kitano
- Produced by: Mori Masayuki
- Starring: Takeshi Kitano; Toshiyuki Nishida
- Cinematography: Katsumi Yanagishima
- Edited by: Takeshi Kitano; Yoshinori Ota
- Music by: Keiichi Suzuki
- Production companies: Bandai Visual; Office Kitano; TV Tokyo
- Distributed by: Warner Bros. Pictures Japan
- Release dates: 9 September 2017 (Venice); 7 October 2017 (Japan)
- Country: Japan
- Languages: Japanese; Korean
- Box office: $12 million

Outrage Coda (Japanese: アウトレイジ 最終章, Hepburn: Autoreiji Saishūshō) is a 2017 Japanese yakuza film written by, edited by, directed by, and starring Takeshi Kitano. It was released in Japan on 7 October 2017. It is a sequel to Kitano's 2012 film, Beyond Outrage, and completes Kitano's Outrage trilogy started in 2010. It received its premiere when it was screened out of competition at the 74th Venice International Film Festival.

== Plot ==
The movie opens up with a scene of two ordinary-looking men, Otomo and his right-hand man Ichikawa fishing off the resort island of Jeju in South Korea, showing that Otomo had escaped the fiasco of the prequel (Beyond Outrage) and had indeed worked with Mr.Chang and had left Japan. Later on that night Otomo is chauffeured to a nightclub full of prostitutes. He is treated with the utmost respect by all thus identifying him as the chief. He soon receives a call from a customer at a hotel with a service complaint. Otomo and a team of men go to meet the customer and encounter a henchman beating up on two of his prostitutes in a hotel living room. Otomo is told that the two prostitutes were non-compliant with their boss, Hanada of the Hanabishi family, the Yakuza family that controls most of Japan. When they go in to talk to him in the bedroom they find him on the bed littered with S&M toys. When Otomo asks for compensation for having hurt the girls Hanada angrily and disrespectfully threatens him. However, only after Otomo's men all show that they are armed and more than willing to shoot him, does Hanada calm down, and softly asks how much should he pay, Otomo tells him to consider the damage and offense he has caused and to pay them accordingly the next day. It is Hanada who blurts out 2 million yen that that amount is finalized. However, Hanada reneges on his promise to pay and has Otomo's man killed when he tries to pick-up the money the next day.

When Hanada, now back in Tokyo, describes the incident to Nakata his boss, the seriousness of his actions are given consideration once they identify that Otomo and the man Hanada had killed belong to Mr. Chang, a fixer who also owns a multinational criminal organization. Nakata offers to mediate the matter for Hanada by meeting with Mr. Chang, intending to settle the situation with 30 million yen as an offering of peace. However, Mr. Chang refuses the 30 million yen, and curiously gives them another 30 million yen to take with them once they leave.

Nakata and Hanada are puzzled by Mr. Chang's gesture until their boss Nishino, the second in command of the Hanabishi clan, mistakenly explains that their original offer of 30 million yen was not enough, and to show his displeasure and the insignificance of their offer Mr. Chang gave them an equal amount. Nishino's explanation is proven wrong however when he meets Mr. Chang and presents him this time with 100 million yen. Mr. Chang refuses again and this time does not even take the time to give Nishino and Hanada the minimum courtesy of attending them nor their 100 million yen. It is clear that while the Hanabishi family are dealing with the situation in the standard way the Yakuza does, Chang does not.

While this is happening in the forefront, in the background the politics of the Hanabishi clan are in full display. The current clan chairman is an ex-stock-broker Nomura who assumed power of the clan because he was the brother-in-law of the old chairman. Nishino and Nakata have very little respect for him and want to take advantage of the Hanada-Otomo conflict in order to overthrow and eliminate Nomura, blaming it on the Chang organization in the process. Nomura knew he couldn't bring down the old guards using force as he lacks in that department, he tried to get both Nishino and Nakata to fight each other and even instructing Nakata to assassinate Nishino. However, already hating how Nomura handles stuff, Nakata instead told Nishino about Nomura's plot to get rid of him thus after the failed meeting with Mr.Chang, Nishino devised a plot where he was ambushed on route back from the meeting and had been shot by his men and subsequently plunged the car with all the victims, including him, into the river while he goes into hiding. Hanada was instead spared and Nishino made him swear allegiance to him whilst sending him back to Nomura to report the supposedly assassination. Nomura, upon hearing that the deed was done, instantly switched the script that Nishino was done in by Mr.Chang's group and order Hanada to kill Mr.Chang in retaliation.

Hanada's men try to assassinate Mr. Chang in a coffee shop as ordered, but failed. Meanwhile, the remnants of the Sanno clan (absorbed into the Hanabishi clan in the previous film) carefully assesses the situation and tries to take advantage for themselves. Being a former Sanno clan member who personally has conflict with the Hanabishi clan, Otomo decides to avenge the offense to him and Mr. Chang by traveling back to Japan and killing the Hanabishi responsible. However, just as Otomo arrived in Japan, he was brought in by the police to investigate him about the murders he had committed before (in Beyond Outrage). Mr. Chang, who received news that Otomo was arrested, pressured the higher ups to release Otomo. To minimizes the conflict, Mr.Chang decided to settles the situation peacefully and wants Otomo to stand down from any retribution he is planning by trying to send him back to South Korea but Otomo refuses.

The conflict culminates in Otomo and the remnants of the Sanno Clan by seeking out all the Hanabishi responsible and killing them all in insidious ways. Nomura, realizing that Otomo had come back to Japan to wipe him and the Hanabishi leaders out, orders a group of hitmen to kill Otomo in a pretext of being Otomo's extra muscle. However, the plan was instantly foiled that Otomo discovered upon the meetup and a gunfight ensued which resulted in the hitmen squad being totally annihilated and a couple of Otomo's guys dying but not Otomo and Ishikawa. Nishino then discretely met up with Otomo and proposes a collaboration effort to bring Nomura down. He told Otomo that there was a gathering that was going to happen where Nomura would attend which would be a good time for Otomo to take Nomura down. Otomo, upon hearing this news, secretly agreed to the collaboration. However, Nomura did not attend the gathering but Nishino had already calculated it out. Instead, he took the chance and attended the gathering himself and right in front of everyone, declared that he had faked his death to escape fake prosecutions by Nomura and the whole organization should rally behind him instead of Nomura. Just as he finishes his speech, Otomo suddenly burst thru the door with Ishikawa, each clutching an assault rifle and started sweeping the ballroom with the rifles, killing everyone in sight. Nishino was however, not hit by any rounds and managed to escape. With the Hanabishi clan seemingly decimated, the seniors finally relented and decided to remove Nomura from the chairman seat and rally behind Nishino due to Nomura's incompetence in dragging the conflict to that stage. Nishino then has Nomura forcibly removed for punishment but instead passed him to Otomo who buried him neck deep then proceeded to run his head over with a car, killing him. Otomo then subsequently found Hanada in a hotel and was tied up due to an S&M game. Otomo took the chance and stuffed a stick of dynamite into Hanada's mouth whilst he was tied up, detonating it and killing Hanada.

He did all this without Mr. Chang's approval, and consequently, he punishes himself by committing modern seppuku - shooting himself as punishment for his offense towards Mr. Chang, once again demonstrating his honor and loyalty. Mr. Chang, when told of the news, reflects sadly while staring into the empty distance.

== Cast ==
- Takeshi Kitano (Beat Takeshi) as Otomo
- Toshiyuki Nishida as Nishino
- Nao Ōmori as Ichikawa
- Pierre Taki as Hanada
- Yutaka Matsushige as Detective Shigeta
- Ren Osugi as Nomura
- Sansei Shiomi as Nakata
- Hakuryu as Lee
- Tatsuo Nadaka as Shirayama
- Ken Mitsuishi as Gomi
- Taizo Harada as Maruyama
- Hiroyuki Ikeuchi as Yoshioka
- Ittoku Kishibe as Morishima
- Hiro Honda as Mr. Chang's assistant
- Tokio Kaneda as Mr. Chang (Chang Dae-Sung)

== Production ==
In September 2012, Takeshi Kitano said that the producers wanted him to make the third Outrage film.

At the premiere of the film during the 74th Venice International Film Festival Kitano recalled his previous positive experience in Venice at the 1997 festival where his film Hana-bi won the Golden Lion, following in the tradition of other Japanese films such as Rashomon which won the gold prize at the 1951 festival. Kitano stated about the new film that "there are various types of Yakuza... even if they are now disappearing. There are various kinds of humanity within these violent groups. Violence contrasts with some of the issues I dealt with in the past, but in this film there are people who are trying to take care of other people. The actions of the characters are influenced by what surrounds them, but I have to admit that I'm a little tired of devoting myself to violence, so I put many elements in the new film".

The film crew includes composer Keiichi Suzuki, cinematographer Katsumi Yanagijima, lighting designer Hitoshi Takaya, production designer Norihiro Isoda, sound designer Yoshifumi Kureishi, casting director Takefumi Yoshikawa, first assistant director Hirofumi Inaba and line producer Shinji Komiya.

=== Music ===
The soundtrack for the film was composed by Keiichi Suzuki who was described in a review as composing an "elliptical score, mixing electronics and jazz horns... sometimes almost subliminally placed in the sound mix, add(ing) an unsettling edge".

== Release ==
On 9 September 2017, Outrage Coda received its premiere screening at the Venice Film Festival in Italy at the closing ceremonies as the final film screened out of competition. It received general release in Japan on 7 October.

== Response ==
=== Box office ===
Outrage Coda grossed $8,836 in Russia and $12 million in Japan. For the opening week-end in Japan on 8 October 2017, the film opened as the number one film with a gate of $3.1 million. Further reception for the film is consistent with the two previous films in the Outrage trilogy, with the box-office performance of the second installment outpacing the first film in the trilogy based on international receipts.

=== Critical reception ===
On review aggregator Rotten Tomatoes, the film holds an approval rating of 60% based on 5 reviews, and an average rating of 7.5/10. On Metacritic, the film has a weighted average score of 58 out of 100, based on 4 critics, indicating "mixed or average reviews". In his positive review of the film for ScreenDaily, Jonathan Romney found the violence in the film to be extreme and the casting to be well matched to the plot: "Many viewers may balk at the fact that the film, taking its genre logic to an uncomfortable extreme, is an entirely male affair, with women relegated to walk-on prostitute roles. But Kitano does cast brilliantly in his selection of utterly unlikable males. Standing out are Taki as the brutish Hanada, Nishida as the gloating conniver Nishino, and Tokio Kaneda as Chang, whose fancy waistcoats and old-school hairstyle make him look like a cattle baron in a 70s Western".

=== Awards ===
| Award ceremony | Category | Nominee | Result |
|---|---|---|---|
| 39th Yokohama Film Festival | Best Supporting Actor | Sansei Shiomi | Won |
| 72nd Mainichi Film Awards | Best Supporting Actor | Toshiyuki Nishida | Nominated |
| 27th Tokyo Sports Film Award | Best Film | Outrage Coda | Won |
| 27th Tokyo Sports Film Award | Best Director | Takeshi Kitano | Won |
| 27th Tokyo Sports Film Award | Best Actor | Toshiyuki Nishida | Won |
| 27th Tokyo Sports Film Award | Best Actor | Sansei Shiomi | Won |
| 27th Tokyo Sports Film Award | Best Supporting Actor | Ren Osugi | Won |
| 27th Tokyo Sports Film Award | Best Supporting Actor | Nao Ōmori | Won |
| 27th Tokyo Sports Film Award | Best Supporting Actor | Pierre Taki | Won |
| 27th Tokyo Sports Film Award | Best Supporting Actor | Yutaka Matsushige | Won |
| 27th Tokyo Sports Film Award | Best Supporting Actor | Tokio Kaneda | Won |
| 27th Tokyo Sports Film Award | Best Newcomer | Tokio Kaneda | Won |
| 41st Japan Academy Prize | Best Music | Keiichi Suzuki | Won |
| 41st Japan Academy Prize | Best Sound Recording | Yoshifumi Kureishi | Nominated |
| 41st Japan Academy Prize | Best Film Editing | Takeshi Kitano and Yoshinori Ota | Nominated |
