= 40th Yokohama Film Festival =

2019 film festival in Yokohama, Japan

- Location: Yokohama, Kanagawa, Japan
- Festival date: 3 February 2019

The 40th Yokohama Film Festival (第４０回ヨコハマ映画祭) was held on 3 February 2019 at Yokohama, Kanagawa, Japan. The awards ceremony was held in the city's Kannai Hall, the results having been announced on 1 December 2018.

== Awards ==
- Best Film: - Asako I & II
- Best Director:
  - Ryusuke Hamaguchi - Asako I & II
  - Takahisa Zeze - The Chrysanthemum and the Guillotine, My Friend "A", The 8-Year Engagement
- Yoshimitsu Morita Memorial Best New Director: Katsumi Nojiri - Lying to Mom
- Best Screenplay: Shûichi Okita - Mori, the Artist's Habitat
- Best Cinematographer: Yasuyuki Sasaki - Asako I & II, My Retirement, My Life
- Best Actor:
  - Masahiro Higashide - Asako I & II, The Chrysanthemum and the Guillotine, Over Drive
  - Kōji Yakusho - The Blood of Wolves
- Best Actress: Sakura Ando - Shoplifters
- Best Supporting Actor: Tori Matsuzaka - The Blood of Wolves
- Best Supporting Actress:
  - Mayu Matsuoka - Shoplifters, Blank13, Chihayafuru Part 3
  - Sairi Ito - Asako I & II, Enokida Trading Post
- Best Newcomer:
  - Erika Karata - Asako I & II
  - Ryo Yoshizawa - River's Edge, Gintama 2: The Law is Surely There to be Broken, Marmalade Boy
  - Mai Kiryû - The Chrysanthemum and the Guillotine, Lying to Mom
- Judges' Special Award: One Cut of the Dead
- Special Grand Prize: Tsutomu Yamazaki - Mori, the Artist's Habitat

== Top 10 ==
1. Asako I & II
2. The Blood of Wolves
3. Shoplifters
4. Hanagatami
5. One Cut of the Dead
6. The Chrysanthemum and the Guillotine
7. Dare to Stop Us
8. And Your Bird Can Sing
9. Lying to Mom
10. Mori, the Artist's Habitat

runner-up: Every Day A Good Day
