= Tokyo Sports Film Award for Special Film Award =

Japanese film award

- Awarded for: Best Performance by a Special Film Award
- Country: Japan
- Presented by: Tokyo Sports
- First award: 2004
- Website: www.tokyo-sports.co.jp/tospo_movie/

The Tokyo Sports Film Award for Special Film Award is an award given at the Tokyo Sports Film Award. This award is established in 2004.

== List of winners ==
No.	Year	Film(s)	Director
14	2004	Devilman	Hiroyuki Nasu
15	2005	War of the Worlds	Steven Spielberg
16	2006	Nihon Igai Zenbu Chinbotsu	Minoru Kawasaki
17	2007	Sukiyaki Western Django	Takashi Miike
17	2007	Glory to the Filmmaker!	Takeshi Kitano
18	2008	Ichi	Fumihiko Sori
19	2009	Ueshima Jane	Makkoi Saitō
20	2010	Zatoichi: The Last	Junji Sakamoto
21	2011	N/A	N/A
22	2012	N/A	N/A
23	2013	47 Ronin	Carl Rinsch
24	2014	N/A	N/A
25	2015	N/A	N/A
