= Tori Matsuzaka =

Japanese actor and model (born 1988)

- 松坂 桃李
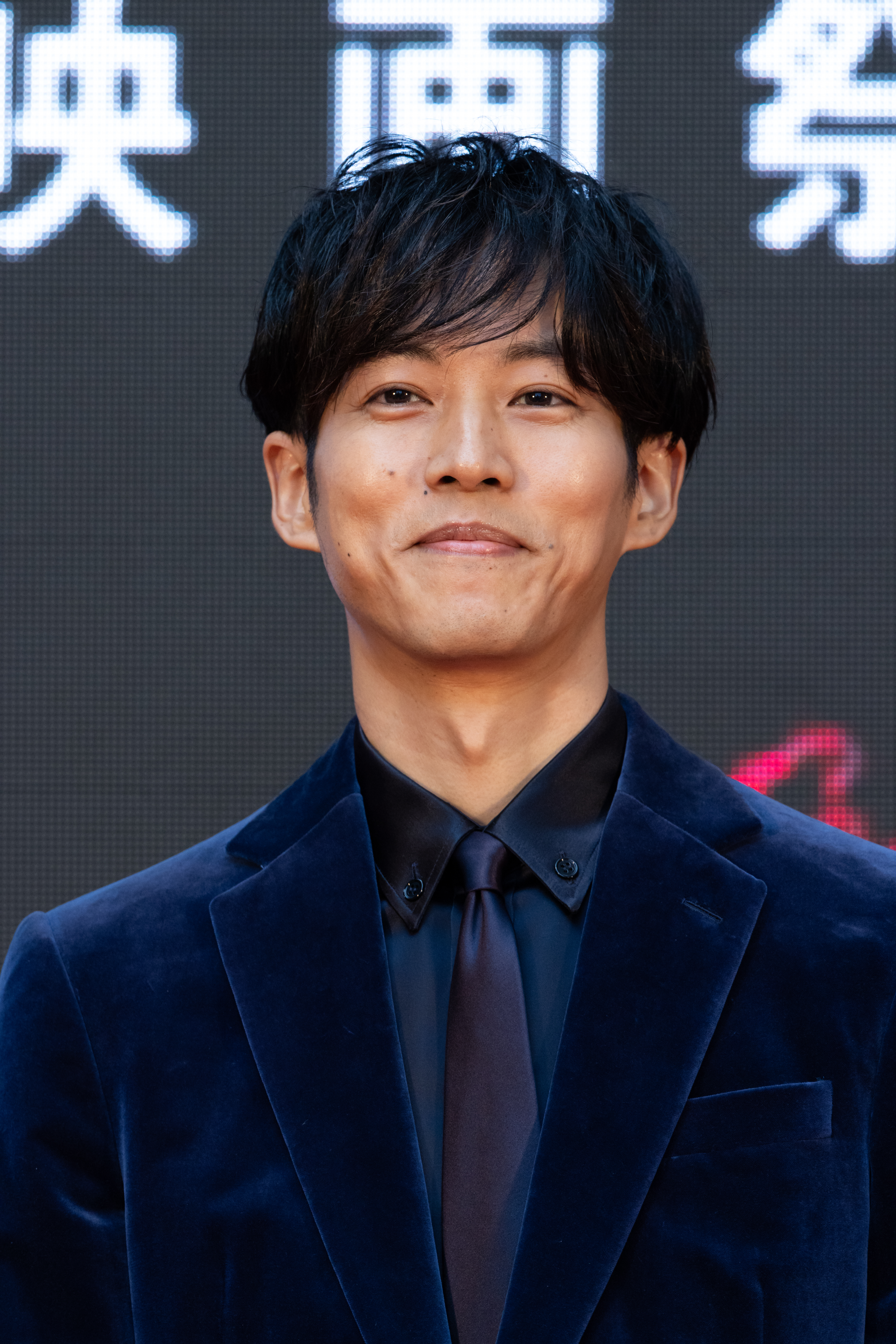
- Matsuzaka at the 37th Tokyo International Film Festival in 2024
- Born: October 17, 1988 (age 38); Kanagawa Prefecture, Japan
- Occupations: Actor; model
- Years active: 2008–present
- Agent: Top Coat
- Height: 1.83 m (6 ft 0 in)
- Spouse: Erika Toda (m. 2020)
- Children: 1
- Website: tori_matsuzaka

Tori Matsuzaka (松坂 桃李, Matsuzaka Tōri; born October 17, 1988) is a Japanese actor and model. He debuted as Takeru Shiba/Shinken Red in Samurai Sentai Shinkenger. Since then, he has appeared in several television shows and films.

== Personal life ==
On December 10, 2020, Matsuzaka married actress Erika Toda, his co-star in the 2015 film April Fools.

On November 28, 2022, it was announced that Toda was pregnant with their first child. On May 4, 2023, Toda gave birth to her first child.

== Filmography ==
=== TV series ===
| Year | Title | Role | Notes | Ref. |
|---|---|---|---|---|
| 2009–2010 | Samurai Sentai Shinkenger | Shiba Takeru / Shinken Red | Lead role | |
| 2012 | Umechan Sensei | Yasuoka Nobuo | Asadora | |
| 2014 | Gunshi Kanbei | Kuroda Nagamasa | Taiga drama | |
| 2016 | We're Millennials. Got a Problem? | Kazutoyo Yamaji | | |
| 2017–2018 | Warotenka | Tōkichi Kitamura | Asadora | |
| 2018 | In This Corner of the World | Shūsaku | | |
| 2019 | Idaten | Yukiaki Iwata | Taiga drama | |
| 2020 | 4 Mysterious Stories | Hiroki Kishimoto | TV movie | |
| 2021 | About the Crisis Here and My Favor | Makoto Kanzaki | Lead role | |
| 2021 | If You Kiss Me At That Time | Nozomi Momochi | Lead role | |
| 2023–2026 | Vivant | Shun Kurosu | 2 seasons | |
| 2025 | Mr. Mikami's Classroom | Takashi Mikami | Lead role | |
| 2027 | The Shogunate Rebel | Oguri Tadamasa | Lead role; Taiga drama | |

=== Film ===
| Year | Title | Role | Notes | Ref. |
|---|---|---|---|---|
| 2011 | Life Back Then | Shintaro Matsui | | |
| 2012 | The Wings of the Kirin | Yuto Aoyagi | | |
| 2012 | Until the Break of Dawn | Ayumi Shibuya | Lead role | |
| 2013 | Gatchaman | Ken Washio | Lead role | |
| 2015 | Maestro! | Shinichi Kōsaka | Lead role | |
| 2015 | The Emperor in August | Kenji Hatanaka | | |
| 2015 | April Fools | Wataru Makino | | |
| 2016 | The Top Secret: Murder in Mind | Katsuhiro Suzuki | | |
| 2017 | Kiseki: Sobito of That Day | JIN | Lead role | |
| 2017 | Birds Without Names | Makoto Mizushima | | |
| 2018 | The Blood of Wolves | Shūichi Hioka | | |
| 2019 | Iwane: Sword of Serenity | Iwane Sasaki | Lead role | |
| 2019 | Listen to the Universe | Akashi Takashima | | |
| 2020 | The Promised Neverland | Mysterious Man | | |
| 2021 | Intolerance | Naoto Aoyagi | Lead role | |
| 2021 | A Morning of Farewell | Seiji Noro | | |
| 2021 | Last of the Wolves | Shūichi Hioka | Lead role | |
| 2021 | In Those Days | Tsurugi | Lead role | |
| 2022 | Wandering | Fumi Saeki | Lead role | |
| 2022 | Whisper of the Heart | 24-year-old Seiji Amasawa | Lead role | |
| 2022 | Fragments of the Last Will | Kenzō Matsuda | | |
| 2023 | Shin Kamen Rider | K (voice) | | |
| 2023 | We're Millennials. Got a Problem?: The Movie | Kazutoyo Yamaji | | |
| 2024 | All About Suomi | Zaemon Tokachi | | |
| 2025 | Snowflowers: Seeds of Hope | Kasahara Ryōsaku | Lead role | |
| 2025 | Frontline: Yokohama Bay | Nobutaka Tatematsu | | |
| 2025 | Unforgettable | Yuta Mamiya | Lead role | |
| 2026 | Cry Out | Ryota Saeki | | |
| 2026 | Sukiyaki | Rokusuke Ei | | |
| 2026 | All the Lovers in the Night | Fuyuko Irie's inner voice | | |
| 2026 | Vivant: The Movie | Shun Kurosu | | |

=== Animated film ===
| Year | Title | Role | Notes | Ref. |
|---|---|---|---|---|
| 2019 | Hello World | Naomi Katagaki (adult ) | | |
| 2023 | New Dimension! Crayon Shin-chan the Movie: Battle of Supernatural Powers ~Flying Sushi~ | Mitsuru Hiriya | | |
| 2025 | 100 Meters | Togashi | Lead role | |

=== Japanese dub ===
| Year | Title | Role | Notes | Ref. |
|---|---|---|---|---|
| 2016 | Paddington | Paddington Bear | | |
| 2018 | Paddington 2 | Paddington Bear | | |
| 2021 | Monster Hunter | The Hunter | | |
| 2025 | Paddington in Peru | Paddington Bear | | |

=== Stage ===
| Year | Title | Role | Notes | Ref. |
|---|---|---|---|---|
| 2012 | Story Telling - Miyazawa Kenji | Narrator | | |

== Awards and nominations ==
| Year | Award | Category | Work(s) | Result | Ref. |
|---|---|---|---|---|---|
| 2012 | 85th Kinema Junpo Awards | Best New Actor | We Can't Change the World. But, We Wanna Build a School in Cambodia., Antoki no Inochi | Won | |
| 2012 | 33rd Yokohama Film Festival | Best Newcomer | We Can't Change the World. But, We Wanna Build a School in Cambodia., Antoki no Inochi | Won | |
| 2012 | 37th Hochi Film Awards | Best Actor | Until the Break of Dawn | Nominated | |
| 2012 | 25th Nikkan Sports Film Awards | Yūjirō Ishihara Newcomer Award | Until the Break of Dawn, The Wings of the Kirin | Won | |
| 2013 | 36th Japan Academy Film Prize | Best New Actor | Until the Break of Dawn, The Wings of the Kirin, Love for Beginners | Won | |
| 2013 | 38th Elan d'or Awards | Newcomer of the Year | | Won | |
| 2013 | 21st Hashida Awards | Rookie Award | Umechan Sensei | Won | |
| 2013 | 22nd Japanese Movie Critics Awards | Best Starring Actor | Until the Break of Dawn | Won | |
| 2015 | 40th Hochi Film Awards | Best Supporting Actor | The Emperor in August | Nominated | |
| 2015 | 28th Nikkan Sports Film Awards | Best Supporting Actor | The Emperor in August | Nominated | |
| 2016 | 58th Blue Ribbon Awards | Best Supporting Actor | The Emperor in August | Nominated | |
| 2016 | 11th Osaka Cinema Festival | Best Supporting Actor | The Emperor in August | Won | |
| 2016 | 41st Hochi Film Awards | Best Supporting Actor | Her Love Boils Bathwater | Nominated | |
| 2017 | 42nd Hochi Film Awards | Best Supporting Actor | Birds Without Names | Nominated | |
| 2017 | 30th Nikkan Sports Film Awards | Best Supporting Actor | Birds Without Names | Nominated | |
| 2018 | 39th Yokohama Film Festival | Best Supporting Actor | Birds Without Names | Won | |
| 2018 | 60th Blue Ribbon Awards | Best Supporting Actor | Birds Without Names | Nominated | |
| 2018 | 10th Tama Film Awards | Best Actor | The Blood of Wolves, Call Boy, Birds Without Names, Impossibility Defense | Won | |
| 2018 | 43rd Hochi Film Awards | Best Actor | Impossibility Defense, Call Boy | Nominated | |
| 2018 | 43rd Hochi Film Awards | Best Supporting Actor | The Blood of Wolves | Nominated | |
| 2018 | 31st Nikkan Sports Film Awards | Best Actor | Call Boy, Impossibility Defense | Won | |
| 2019 | 40th Yokohama Film Festival | Best Supporting Actor | The Blood of Wolves | Won | |
| 2019 | 61st Blue Ribbon Awards | Best Actor | Call Boy | Nominated | |
| 2019 | 61st Blue Ribbon Awards | Best Supporting Actor | The Blood of Wolves | Won | |
| 2019 | 28th Tokyo Sports Film Awards | Best Supporting Actor | The Blood of Wolves | Won | |
| 2019 | 14th Osaka Cinema Festival | Best Supporting Actor | The Blood of Wolves | Won | |
| 2019 | 73rd Mainichi Film Awards | Best Supporting Actor | The Blood of Wolves | Nominated | |
| 2019 | 92nd Kinema Junpo Awards | Best Supporting Actor | The Blood of Wolves | Won | |
| 2019 | 42nd Japan Academy Film Prize | Best Supporting Actor | The Blood of Wolves | Won | |
| 2019 | 44th Hochi Film Awards | Best Supporting Actor | Listen to the Universe | Nominated | |
| 2019 | 32nd Nikkan Sports Film Awards | Best Actor | The Journalist | Nominated | |
| 2019 | 32nd Nikkan Sports Film Awards | Best Supporting Actor | Listen to the Universe | Nominated | |
| 2020 | 39th Zenkoku Eiren Awards | Best Actor | The Journalist | Won | |
| 2020 | 62nd Blue Ribbon Awards | Best Actor | The Journalist | Nominated | |
| 2020 | 62nd Blue Ribbon Awards | Best Supporting Actor | Listen to the Universe | Nominated | |
| 2020 | 43rd Japan Academy Film Prize | Best Actor | The Journalist | Won | |
| 2021 | 46th Hochi Film Awards | Best Actor | Last of the Wolves, In Those Days | Nominated | |
| 2021 | 46th Hochi Film Awards | Best Supporting Actor | A Morning of Farewell, Intolerance | Nominated | |
| 2021 | 34th Nikkan Sports Film Awards | Best Actor | Last of the Wolves | Nominated | |
| 2022 | 43rd Yokohama Film Festival | Best Actor | Intolerance, Last of the Wolves, In Those Days | Won | |
| 2022 | 17th Osaka Cinema Festival | Best Actor | Intolerance | Won | |
| 2022 | 64th Blue Ribbon Awards | Best Actor | Last of the Wolves, In Those Days | Nominated | |
| 2022 | 45th Japan Academy Film Prize | Best Actor | Last of the Wolves | Nominated | |
| 2022 | 14th Tama Film Awards | Best Actor | Wandering | Won | |
| 2022 | 35th Nikkan Sports Film Awards | Best Actor | Wandering and Whisper of the Heart | Nominated | |
| 2023 | 46th Japan Academy Film Prize | Best Actor | Wandering | Nominated | |
| 2025 | 18th Tokyo Drama Awards | Best Actor | Mr. Mikami's Classroom | Won | |

== Magazines ==
- Fineboys
- SJ STREET and Takei Emi
- FINEBOYS
- CEDAR CREST
- Audition
- Puma Meets
- Koi.Men
- GC
- ACTORS Magazine
- Shibuya 109 MEN'S!

== CFs ==
- GHANNA
- ACUO
- Lotte (2012)
