= Tokyo Sports Film Award for Best Film =

Japanese film award

- Awarded for: Best Performance by a Film
- Country: Japan
- Presented by: Tokyo Sports
- First award: 1991
- Website: www.tokyo-sports.co.jp/tospo_movie/

The Tokyo Sports Film Award for Best Film is an award given at the Tokyo Sports Film Award.

== List of winners ==
No.	Year	Film	Director
1	1991	A Scene at the Sea	Takeshi Kitano
2	1992	Erotic Liaisons	Kōji Wakamatsu
3	1993	Moving	Shinji Sōmai
4	1994	Tsuma wa Filipina	Yasunori Terada
5	1995	Ghost in the Shell	Mamoru Oshii
6	1996	Kids Return	Takeshi Kitano
7	1997	Postman Blues	Hiroyuki Tanaka
8	1998	Hana-bi	Takeshi Kitano
9	1999	After Life	Hirokazu Koreeda
10	2000	Battle Royale	Kinji Fukasaku
11	2001	Brother	Takeshi Kitano
12	2002	Dolls	Takeshi Kitano
13	2003	Zatōichi	Takeshi Kitano
14	2004	Nobody Knows	Hirokazu Koreeda
15	2005	N/A	N/A
16	2006	Sway	Miwa Nishikawa
17	2007	N/A	N/A
18	2008	Still Walking	Hirokazu Koreeda
19	2009	N/A	N/A
20	2010	Outrage	Takeshi Kitano
21	2011	Cold Fish	Sion Sono
22	2012	Beyond Outrage	Takeshi Kitano
23	2013	The Great Passage	Yuya Ishii
24	2014	N/A	N/A
25	2015	Ryuzo and the Seven Henchmen	Takeshi Kitano
26	2016	In This Corner of the World	Sunao Katabuchi
27	2017	Outrage Coda	Takeshi Kitano
28	2018	Shoplifters	Hirokazu Koreeda
