= Tokyo Sports Film Award for Best Newcomer =

Japanese film award

- Awarded for: Best Performance by a Newcomer
- Country: Japan
- Presented by: Tokyo Sports
- First award: 1991
- Website: www.tokyo-sports.co.jp/tospo_movie/

The Tokyo Sports Film Award for Best Newcomer is an award given at the Tokyo Sports Film Award.

== List of winners ==
No.	Year	Actor(s)	Film
1	1991	Tanie Kitabayashi	
2	1992	Nobuko Otowa	
3	1993	Tsutomu Yamazaki	
4	1994	Mitsuko Miyazawa (Rie Miyazawa's mother)	
5	1995	Susumu Terajima	
6	1996	Masanobu Andō	Kids Return
7	1997	Hitomi Satō	
8	1998	Rena Tanaka	
9	1999	Yūsuke Iseya	
10	2000	Tatsuya Fujiwara	Battle Royale
11	2001	Kō Shibasaki	
12	2002	Tsutomu Takeshige	
13	2003	Kansai Yamamoto	The Blue Light
14	2004	Yūya Yagira	Nobody Knows
15	2005	Erika Sawajiri	Shinobi; Break Through!
16	2006	Yūichi Kimura	Sway
17	2007	Kie Kitano	Kōfuku na Shokutaku
18	2008	Matazō Mimata; Omiya no Matsu; Al Kitagō	Achilles and the Tortoise
19	2009	N/A	N/A
20	2010	Sōichirō Kitamura	Outrage
21	2011	N/A	N/A
22	2012	Makita Sports	Kueki Ressha
23	2013	Haru Kuroki	The Great Passage; A Chair on the Plains
24	2014	Gekidan Hitori	A Bolt from the Blue
25	2015	Suzu Hirose	Umimachi Diary
26	2016	Hana Sugisaki	Her Love Boils Bathwater
27	2017	Tokio Kaneda	Outrage Coda
28	2018	Harumi Shuhama	One Cut of the Dead
