= Shoplifters (film) =

2018 film

- Theatrical release poster

Japanese name
- Kanji: 万引き家族
- Literal meaning: Shoplifting Family
Transcriptions
- Revised Hepburn: Manbiki Kazoku
- Directed by: Hirokazu Kore-eda
- Screenplay by: Hirokazu Kore-eda
- Produced by: Hirokazu Kore-eda; Matsuzaki Kaoru; Yose Akihiko; Taguchi Hijiri
- Starring: Lily Franky; Sakura Ando; Mayu Matsuoka; Kairi Jō; Miyu Sasaki; Kirin Kiki
- Cinematography: Kondo Ryuto
- Edited by: Hirokazu Kore-eda
- Music by: Haruomi Hosono
- Production company: AOI Pro.
- Distributed by: Gaga Corporation
- Release dates: 15 May 2018 (Cannes); 9 June 2018 (Japan)
- Running time: 121 minutes
- Country: Japan
- Language: Japanese
- Box office: $72.6 million

Shoplifters (Japanese: 万引き家族, romanized: Manbiki Kazoku, lit. 'Shoplifting Family') is a 2018 Japanese drama film written, directed and edited by Hirokazu Kore-eda. Starring Lily Franky and Sakura Ando, it is about a family that relies on shoplifting to cope with a life of poverty.

Kore-eda wrote the screenplay contemplating what makes a family, inspired by reports on poverty and shoplifting in Japan. Principal photography began in mid-December 2017.

Shoplifters premiered at the 2018 Cannes Film Festival, where it won the Palme d'Or. The film was released in Japan on 8 June 2018 and was a critical and commercial success. Shoplifters won three Mainichi Film Awards, including Best Film, and the Asia Pacific Screen Award for Best Feature Film, and was nominated for Best Foreign Language Film at the Oscars and the Golden Globes.

== Plot ==
In Tokyo, a family lives together in poverty: Hatsue, an elderly woman who owns the home and supports them with her deceased husband's pension; Nobuyo, who works for an industrial laundry service; her husband Osamu, a day laborer forced to leave his job after twisting his ankle; Aki, who works at a JK peep shop; and Shota, a young boy.

Osamu and Shota routinely shoplift from stores, using a system of hand signals to communicate. Osamu tells Shota it is fine to steal things that have not been sold, as they do not belong to anyone. One cold night, they see Yuri, a neighborhood girl they regularly observe locked out on an apartment balcony, and bring her home with them. They only intend to have her stay for dinner, but after finding evidence of abuse, they choose not to return her.

Yuri bonds with her new family and learns to shoplift from Osamu and Shota. Osamu urges Shota to see him as his father and Yuri as his sister, but Shota is reluctant. The family learns on television that after almost two months, police are investigating Yuri's disappearance; her parents never reported her missing. The family cuts her hair, burns her old clothes, and renames her Lin.

Hatsue visits her husband's son from an affair, from whom she regularly receives money. The son and his wife are Aki's parents; they lie that their daughter is living in Australia. The family visits the beach, and Hatsue expresses contentment that she will not die a lonely death. At home that night, she dies in her sleep. Osamu and Nobuyo bury her under the house in order to avoid reporting her death and continue to collect her pension.

Osamu steals a purse from a car, making Shota feel uneasy since he considers this theft against their moral code. Shota recalls joining the family after Nobuyo and Osamu found him in a locked car. Increasingly guilt-ridden about teaching Yuri to steal, Shota interrupts her theft by stealing fruit from a grocery store in view of the staff. Cornered, he jumps from a bridge and breaks his leg.

Shota is hospitalized and detained by police. Nobuyo and Osamu are caught after attempting to flee with Yuri and Aki. The authorities discover Yuri and the death of Hatsue and tell Shota that the family was going to abandon him. They reveal to Aki that Nobuyo and Osamu previously killed Nobuyo's abusive husband in self-defense, and that Hatsue was receiving money from Aki's parents.

Nobuyo takes the blame for the crimes to protect Osamu, who has a previous criminal record, and is sentenced to prison. Shota is placed in an orphanage. Osamu and Shota visit Nobuyo in prison, and she gives Shota details of the car they found him in so he can search for his parents. Shota stays overnight with Osamu, against the orphanage's rules. When Shota asks, Osamu tells him the truth, confirming that they intended to abandon him, and says he can no longer be his father.

The next morning, as he is about to depart, Shota says that he allowed himself to be caught. Osamu runs after Shota's bus; Shota looks back and finally acknowledges Osamu as his father. Yuri is returned to her parents, who continue to neglect her, and looks wistfully back at the house she shared with the family.

== Cast ==
- Lily Franky as Osamu Shibata (柴田 治, Shibata Osamu)
- Sakura Ando as Nobuyo Shibata (柴田 信代, Shibata Nobuyo)
- Mayu Matsuoka as Aki Shibata (柴田 亜紀, Shibata Aki)
- Kairi Jo as Shota Shibata (柴田 祥太, Shibata Shōta)
- Kirin Kiki as Hatsue Shibata (柴田 初枝, Shibata Hatsue)
- Miyu Sasaki as Yuri (ゆり)/Juri Hojo (北条 じゅり, Hōjō Juri)/Rin
- Sosuke Ikematsu as 4 ban-san (4番さん)
- Naoto Ogata as Yuzuru Shibata (柴田 譲, Shibata Yuzuru)
- Yoko Moriguchi as Yoko Shibata (柴田 葉子, Shibata Yōko)
- Aju Makita as Sayaka Shibata (柴田 さやか, Shibata Sayaka)
- Yūki Yamada as Yasu Hojo (北条 保, Hōjō Yasu)
- Moemi Katayama as Nozomi Hojo (北条 希, Hōjō Nozomi)
- Kengo Kora as Takumi Maezono (前園 巧, Maezono Takumi)
- Chizuru Ikewaki as Kie Miyabe (宮部 希衣, Miyabe Kie)
- Akira Emoto as Yoritsugu Kawado (山戸 頼次, Kawado Yoritsugu)

== Production ==
Director Hirokazu Kore-eda said that he developed the story for Shoplifters when considering his earlier film Like Father, Like Son, with the question "What makes a family?" He had been considering a film exploring this question for 10 years before making Shoplifters. Kore-eda described it as his "socially conscious" film. With this story, Kore-eda said he did not want the perspective to be from only a few individual characters, but to capture "the family within the society", a "wide point of view" in the vein of his 2004 film Nobody Knows. He set his story in Tokyo and was also influenced by the Japanese Recession, including media reports of how people lived in poverty and of shoplifting. To research the project, Kore-eda toured an orphanage and wrote a scene inspired by a girl there who read from Swimmy by Leo Lionni. Kore-eda said,

When I visited an orphanage, a little girl took the picture book Swimmy out of her backpack and suddenly started to read it. The staff tried to stop her, telling her she was bothering us, but she read it to the end. Everyone, including the staff, was moved and applauded her. She looked so happy. I thought she really wanted to read that book to her parents. I couldn't get her out of my head and wrote a scene reflecting that moment.

When I was working in TV, a senpai (senior) told me that I should make my program for one person, be it my mother or a friend or anyone. … I made this film for the little girl I'd heard reading Swimmy.

Lily Franky and Sakura Ando joined the cast before principal photography began in mid-December 2017. Child actors Sasaki Miyu and Kairi Jo were cast for their first film. Sosuke Ikematsu, Chizuru Ikewaki and Yūki Yamada joined the cast in February. It was also one of the last films Kirin Kiki appeared in before her death in 2018.

Production began in December 2017, with Fuji Television Network, Gaga, and AOI Pro producing. Cinematographer Kondo Ryuto used 35 mm film with an Arricam ST, aware 35 mm was a preference of Kore-eda's and also seeking the right texture and grain for the story.

== Release ==
With Gaga Corporation as its distributor, the film was selected to screen at the 2018 Cannes Film Festival, where it went on to win the Palme d'Or. In Japan, it was scheduled for release on 8 June 2018. Magnolia Pictures also obtained the rights to distribute the film in North America. On 23 May 2018, Thunderbird Releasing acquired the UK distribution rights, while Road Pictures secured the rights to distribute it in China.

== Reception ==
=== Box office ===
The film grossed ¥4.55 billion ($37.8 million) in Japan by the end of 2018, making it the fourth highest-grossing domestic film of the year and the second highest-grossing Japanese live-action film of the year (after Code Blue). In China, the film grossed $14 million, in what The Hollywood Reporter called "an unprecedentedly strong performance for an imported pure arthouse drama". Shoplifters also grossed $3,313,513 in the United States and Canada, and $17,398,743 in other territories, for a worldwide total of $72,625,772. This makes it the most successful commercially of the five nominees for the 2019 Academy Award for Best International Film.It scored China Box Office Record.

In its tenth weekend of release in the United States and Canada, following its Oscar nomination, the film made $190,000 from 114 theaters, for a running total of $2.5 million up until then.

=== Home media ===
In the United Kingdom, it was 2019's fourth best-selling foreign language film on home video, below the Hayao Miyazaki anime films Spirited Away, My Neighbor Totoro and Princess Mononoke.

=== Critical response ===
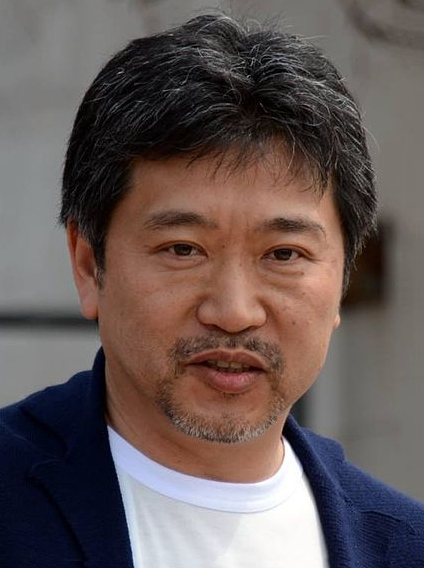
Hirokazu Kore-eda's direction was praised by critics.

On review aggregator website Rotten Tomatoes, the film holds an approval rating 99% based on 230 reviews, with an average rating of 8.8/10. The website's critical consensus reads, "Understated yet ultimately deeply affecting, Shoplifters adds another powerful chapter to director Hirokazu Kore-eda's richly humanistic filmography." On Metacritic, the film has a weighted average score of 93 out of 100, based on 40 critics, indicating "universal acclaim". Shoplifters was also listed on numerous critics' top ten lists for 2018.

Peter Bradshaw of The Guardian gave Shoplifters 4/5 stars, declaring it a "rich, satisfying film", and subsequently upgraded this to a 5/5 star review upon second viewing. The Guardian later ranked the film 15th in its Best Films of the 21st Century list. The Hollywood Reporter critic Deborah Young called it "bittersweet" as it "contrasts the frigid emotions of socially correct behavior with the warmth and happiness of a dishonest lower-class family". Robbie Collin of The Daily Telegraph awarded it five stars, hailing it as an "outstanding domestic drama, crafted by Kore-eda with crystalline insight and an unsparing emotional acuity".

For IndieWire, David Ehrlich gave it a grade of "A−" and wrote the film "stings" with "the loneliness of not belonging to anyone, and the messiness of sticking together". TheWrap's Ben Croll declared it Kore-eda's "richest film to date". In Time Out, Geoff Andrew gave it four stars and saluted Kore-eda as "a modern-day Ozu". Variety's Maggie Lee also compared it to Oliver Twist by Charles Dickens; Lily Franky's character Osamu was likewise compared to Dickens's character Fagin.

In 2025, it was one of the films voted for the "Readers' Choice" edition of The New York Times' list of "The 100 Best Movies of the 21st Century," finishing at number 202.

In Japan, The Japan Times gave Shoplifters five stars, writing "The cheers are entirely deserved" and credited it for an "outwardly naturalistic" style.

=== Accolades ===
The film competed at the Cannes Film Festival, where it won the Palme d'Or on 19 May. It was the first Japanese Palme d'Or-winner since The Eel in 1997. Jury president Cate Blanchett explained the decision: "We were completely bowled over by Shoplifters. How intermeshed the performances were with the directorial vision". In July 2018, Shoplifters also won Best International Film at the Munich Film Festival, with the jury citing it by stating it "opens up new possibilities and ultimately offers [...] hope".

In August, Shoplifters was selected as the Japanese entry for the Best Foreign Language Film at the 91st Academy Awards. It made the December shortlist in 2018, before being nominated for the Academy Award in January 2019.

Award	Date of ceremony	Category	Recipient(s)	Result	Ref(s)
Academy Awards	24 February 2019	Best Foreign Language Film	Japan	Nominated	
AACTA Awards	January 2019	Best Asian Film	Kaoru Matsuzaki, Akihiko Yose and Hijiri Taguchi	Nominated	
Alliance of Women Film Journalists	10 January 2019	Best Non-English Film	Hirokazu Kore-eda	Nominated	
Asian Film Awards	17 March 2019	Best Film		Won	
Asian Film Awards	17 March 2019	Best Director	Hirokazu Kore-eda	Nominated	
Asian Film Awards	17 March 2019	Best Actress	Sakura Ando	Nominated	
Asian Film Awards	17 March 2019	Best Supporting Actress	Mayu Matsuoka	Nominated	
Asian Film Awards	17 March 2019	Best Original Music	Hosono Haruomi	Won	
Asian Film Awards	17 March 2019	Best Production Design	Keiko Mitsumatsu	Nominated	
Asia Pacific Screen Awards	29 November 2018	Best Film	Kaoru Matsuzaki, Akihiko Yose and Hijiri Taguchi	Won	
Asia Pacific Screen Awards	29 November 2018	Best Directing	Hirokazu Kore-eda	Nominated	
Asia Pacific Screen Awards	29 November 2018	Best Screenplay	Hirokazu Kore-eda	Nominated	
Austin Film Critics Association	7 January 2019	Best Foreign Language Film		Nominated	
BAFTA Awards	10 February 2019	Best Film Not in the English Language		Nominated	
Bodil Awards	2 March 2019	Best Non-American Film	Hirokazu Kore-eda	Nominated	
Boston Society of Film Critics	16 December 2018	Best Foreign Language Film		Won	
Boston Society of Film Critics	16 December 2018	Best Ensemble Cast		Won	
British Independent Film Awards	2 December 2018	Best International Film		Nominated	
Cannes Film Festival	8 – 19 May 2018	Palme d'Or	Hirokazu Kore-eda	Won	
César Awards	22 February 2019	Best Foreign Film	Hirokazu Kore-eda	Won	
Chicago Film Critics Association	8 December 2018	Best Foreign Language Film		Nominated	
Critics' Choice Movie Awards	13 January 2019	Best Foreign Language Film		Nominated	
Dallas–Fort Worth Film Critics Association	17 December 2018	Best Foreign Language Film		3rd Place	
Denver Film Festival	31 October – 11 November 2018	Best Narrative Feature Film	Hirokazu Kore-eda	Won	
Dublin Film Critics' Circle	20 December 2018	Best Film		8th Place	
Dublin Film Critics' Circle	20 December 2018	Best Director	Hirokazu Kore-eda	7th Place	
Florida Film Critics Circle	21 December 2018	Best Supporting Actress	Sakura Ando	Won	
Florida Film Critics Circle	21 December 2018	Best Foreign Language Film		Won	
Golden Globes	6 January 2019	Best Foreign Language Film		Nominated	
Guldbagge Awards	28 January 2019	Best Foreign Film	Hirokazu Kore-eda	Won	
Independent Spirit Awards	23 February 2019	Best International Film	Hirokazu Kore-eda	Nominated	
Japan Academy Prize	1 March 2019	Picture of the Year		Won	
Japan Academy Prize	1 March 2019	Director of the Year	Hirokazu Kore-eda	Won	
Japan Academy Prize	1 March 2019	Screenplay of the Year	Hirokazu Kore-eda	Won	
Japan Academy Prize	1 March 2019	Best Editing	Hirokazu Kore-eda	Nominated	
Japan Academy Prize	1 March 2019	Outstanding Actor	Lily Franky	Nominated	
Japan Academy Prize	1 March 2019	Outstanding Actress	Sakura Ando	Won	
Japan Academy Prize	1 March 2019	Outstanding Supporting Actress	Mayu Matsuoka	Nominated	
Japan Academy Prize	1 March 2019	Outstanding Supporting Actress	Kirin Kiki	Won	
Japan Academy Prize	1 March 2019	Outstanding Music	Haruomi Hosono	Won	
Japan Academy Prize	1 March 2019	Outstanding Cinematography	Ryūto Kondō	Won	
Japan Academy Prize	1 March 2019	Outstanding Lighting Direction	Isamu Fujii	Won	
Japan Academy Prize	1 March 2019	Outstanding Art Direction	Keiko Mitsumatsu	Nominated	
Japan Academy Prize	1 March 2019	Outstanding Sound Recording	Kazuhiko Tomita	Nominated	
Kinema Junpo Awards	28 January 2019	Best Film		Won	
London Film Critics' Circle	20 January 2019	Film of the Year		Nominated	
London Film Critics' Circle	20 January 2019	Foreign Language Film of the Year		Nominated	
Los Angeles Film Critics Association	9 December 2018	Best Foreign Language Film		Won (Note: Shared with Burning.)	
Mainichi Film Awards	2019	Best Film		Won	
Mainichi Film Awards	2019	Best Actress	Sakura Ando	Won	
Mainichi Film Awards	2019	Best Supporting Actress	Kirin Kiki	Won	
Munich Film Festival	28 June – 7 July 2018	Best International Film	Hirokazu Kore-eda	Won	
National Board of Review	27 November 2018	Top 5 Foreign Language Films		Won	
Nikkan Sports Film Awards	2018	Best Film	Hirokazu Kore-eda	Won	
Nikkan Sports Film Awards	2018	Best Actress	Sakura Ando	Won	
Nikkan Sports Film Awards	2018	Best Supporting Actress	Kirin Kiki	Won	
Online Film Critics Society	2 January 2019	Best Foreign Language Film		Nominated	
San Diego Film Critics Society	10 December 2018	Best Foreign Language Film		Won	
Satellite Awards	17 February 2019	Best Foreign Language Film		Nominated	
Seattle Film Critics Society	17 December 2018	Best Foreign Language Film		Nominated	
St. Louis Film Critics Association	16 December 2018	Best Foreign Language Film		Nominated	
Tokyo Sports Film Awards	2019	Best Film		Won	
Tokyo Sports Film Awards	2019	Best Actress	Sakura Ando	Won	
Tokyo Sports Film Awards	2019	Best Actor	Lily Franky	Won	
Vancouver Film Critics Circle	17 December 2018	Best Foreign Language Film		Nominated	
Vancouver International Film Festival	27 September – 12 October 2018	Most Popular International Feature	Hirokazu Kore-eda	Won	
Washington D.C. Area Film Critics Association	3 December 2018	Best Foreign Language Film		Nominated	

== See also ==
- Cinema of Japan
- List of submissions to the 91st Academy Awards for Best Foreign Language Film
- List of Japanese submissions for the Academy Award for Best Foreign Language Film
- Parasite, a 2019 South Korean film directed by Bong Joon-ho about the wealth gap and class divide in an East Asian country. The film has been frequently compared to Shoplifters
