= Tokyo Sports Film Award for Best Actor =

Japanese film award

- Awarded for: Best Performance by an Actor
- Country: Japan
- Presented by: Tokyo Sports
- First award: 1991
- Website: www.tokyo-sports.co.jp/tospo_movie/

The Tokyo Sports Film Award for Best Actor is an award given at the Tokyo Sports Film Award. This award is not only given to a person, but also a film character such as Godzilla in 1992.

== List of winners ==
No.	Year	Actor(s)	Film
1	1991	Claude Maki	
2	1992	Godzilla	
3	1993	N/A	
4	1994	Eiji Okuda	
5	1995	N/A	
6	1996	Tetta Sugimoto	
7	1997	N/A	
8	1998	Takeshi Kitano	
9	1999	Takeshi Kitano	
10	2000	N/A	
11	2001	Yōsuke Kubozuka	
12	2002	N/A	
13	2003	Takeshi Kitano	Zatōichi
14	2004	Takeshi Kitano	Blood and Bones
15	2005	Takeshi Kitano	Takeshis'
16	2006	Takuya Kimura	Love and Honor
17	2007	Joe Odagiri	Tokyo Tower: Mom and Me, and Sometimes Dad
18	2008	Masahiro Motoki	Departures
19	2009	Shōfukutei Tsurube	Dear Doctor
20	2010	Etsushi Toyokawa	Sword of Desperation; Kondo wa Aisaika
21	2011	N/A	N/A
22	2012	Toshiyuki Nishida; Tomokazu Miura; Ryo Kase; Hideo Nakano; Yutaka Matsushige; Fumiyo Kohinata; Katsunori Takahashi; Kenta Kiritani; Hirofumi Arai; Sansei Shiomi; Akira Nakao; Shigeru Kōyama	Outrage
23	2013	Ryuhei Matsuda	The Great Passage
24	2014	Ryūhei Ueshima	Ueshima Jane Beyond
25	2015	Tatsuya Fuji	Ryuzo and the Seven Henchmen
26	2016	Tomokazu Miura	Katsuragi Case
27	2017	Toshiyuki Nishida; Sansei Shiomi	Outrage Coda
28	2018	Lily Franky	Shoplifters
