= Tokyo Sports Film Award for Special Award =

Japanese film award

- Awarded for: Best Performance by a Special Award
- Country: Japan
- Presented by: Tokyo Sports
- First award: 1991
- Website: www.tokyo-sports.co.jp/tospo_movie/

The Tokyo Sports Film Award for Special Award is an award given at the Tokyo Sports Film Award.

== List of winners ==
No.	Year	Actor(s)	Film
1	1991	Hiroki Matsukata	
2	1992	Rie Asai; Midori Kuwana	
3	1993	N/A	N/A
4	1994	N/A	N/A
5	1995	N/A	N/A
6	1996	Ken Shimura	
7	1997	Haruo Mizuno	Shiberia Chōtokkyū
8	1998		Pekin Genjin Who are you?
9	1999	Ide Rakkyo	
10	2000	Kiyotaka Nanbara	Natou Odoru! Ninja Densetsu
11	2001	N/A	N/A
12	2002	N/A	N/A
13	2003	Stripes (for choreography)	Zatōichi
14	2004	N/A	N/A
15	2005	N/A	N/A
16	2006	N/A	N/A
17	2007	N/A	N/A
18	2008	N/A	N/A
19	2009	N/A	N/A
20	2010	N/A	N/A
21	2011	Seizō Fukumoto	
22	2012	Nagisa Oshima	
23	2013	Hayao Miyazaki; Kankurō Kudō	
24	2014	N/A	N/A
25	2015	N/A	N/A
