= Tokyo Sports Film Award for Best Actress =

Japanese film award

- Awarded for: Best Performance by an Actress
- Country: Japan
- Presented by: Tokyo Sports
- First award: 1991
- Website: www.tokyo-sports.co.jp/tospo_movie/

The Tokyo Sports Film Award for Best Actress is an award given at the Tokyo Sports Film Award.

== List of winners ==
No.	Year	Actor(s)	Film(s)
1	1991	N/A	N/A
2	1992	Noriko Hanada (Takanohana Kenshi's mother)	
3	1993	Ruby Moreno	
4	1994	Saki Takaoka	
5	1995	Motoko Kusanagi	
6	1996	Yaya Kōzuki	
7	1997	Eri Yū	
8	1998	Mieko Harada	
9	1999	Tomi Taira	
10	2000	Naomi Fujiyama	Face
11	2001	Kyōko Koizumi	
12	2002	Rie Miyazawa	
13	2003	Asuka Kurosawa	A Snake of June
14	2004	Kyoko Fukada	Kamikaze Girls
15	2005	Kyōko Koizumi	Hanging Garden
16	2006	Yū Aoi	Hula Girls
17	2007	Jun Fubuki	Tamashii Moe!
18	2008	Tae Kimura	All Around Us
19	2009	Bae Doona	Air Doll
20	2010	Riisa Naka	Time Traveller: The Girl Who Leapt Through Time; Zebraman 2: Attack on Zebra City
21	2011	N/A	N/A
22	2012	Takako Matsu	Yume Uru Futari
23	2013	Yōko Maki	The Ravine of Goodbye
24	2014	Rie Miyazawa	Pale Moon
25	2015	Haruka Ayase	Umimachi Diary
26	2016	Rie Miyazawa	Her Love Boils Bathwater
27	2017	Masami Nagasawa	Before We Vanish
28	2018	Sakura Ando	Shoplifters
