= Kenichi Yajima =

Japanese actor (born 1956)

- Born: March 1, 1956 (age 70); Gifu, Japan
- Occupation: Actor
- Years active: 1981–present

Kenichi Yajima (矢島 健一, Yajima Ken'ichi; born March 1, 1956, in Gifu) is a Japanese actor.

== Career ==
Graduating from Meiji Gakuin University, Yajima debuted as an actor in 1981. A frequent player in the films of Masato Harada, Yajima often plays yakuza and other bad guys, but can also do comic relief. He has appeared in over 200 TV dramas and 70 films.

== Filmography ==
=== Film ===
Year	Title	Role	Notes	Ref.
1993	Sonatine	Takahashi		
1995	Kamikaze Taxi	Ishida		
1997	Hana-bi	Doctor		
1999	Spellbound	Takuya Ishii		
2001	Onmyoji	Fujiwara no Morosuke		
2004	Lady Joker	Hidetsugu Kanzaki		
2004	Kagen no Tsuki	Sayaka's father		
2006	Tokyo Friends: The Movie	Kitahara		
2006	The Uchōten Hotel	Arai		
2006	Sinking of Japan	Minister for Foreign Affairs		
2006	Strawberry Shortcakes	Ōsaki		
2007	Densen Uta	Yorii		
2008	Climber's High	Moriya		
2008	10 Promises to My Dog	Dr. Sakamoto		
2009	Shizumanu Taiyō	Taketarō Aoyama		
2010	Sword of Desperation	Yabe Magochiyo		
2012	Lesson of the Evil	Detective Shimozuru		
2014	A Samurai Chronicle			
2015	Ryuzo and the Seven Henchmen	Hōjō		
2015	Flying Colors			
2015	The Emperor in August	Kōichi Kido		
2016	Fueled: The Man They Called Pirate			
2016	Shin Godzilla	Minister of Land, Infrastructure, Transport and Tourism		
2017	Reminiscence			
2017	Manhunt		Chinese film	
2018	Killing for the Prosecution	Takashima		
2018	Recall	Manabe		
2018	The Blood of Wolves	Keiji Tomotake		
2018	My Friend "A"			
2018	Last Winter, We Parted			
2020	Fukushima 50			
2020	All About March			
2021	Last of the Wolves	Keiji Tomotake		
2022	The Pass: Last Days of the Samurai	Matsudaira Sadaaki		
2022	Akira and Akira			
2022	The Lines That Define Me	Kunieda		
2023	Kubi	Honda Tadakatsu		
2025	Muromachi Outsiders	Ise Sadachika		
2025	Snowflowers: Seeds of Hope			
2026	The Specials	Zaizen		

=== Television ===
Year	Title	Role	Notes	Ref.
1981	Omoide Zukuri	Okazaki	Debut role	
1984	Romance		Asadora	
1989	Kasuga no Tsubone	Fukushima Masanori	Taiga drama	
1990	Wataru Seken wa Oni Bakari	Narita		
1999	Keizoku	Seiichi Hayashida		
2004	Part-Time Detective 2	Keiichi Toritani		
2004	Itoshi Kimi e	Yukihiko Ogasawara		
2004	Shinsengumi!	Hirosawa Tomijirō	Taiga drama	
2006	Kōmyō ga Tsuji	Naoe Kanetsugu	Taiga drama	
2008	Atsuhime	Matsudaira Yoshinaga	Taiga drama	
2010	Sunao ni Narenakute	Tomohiko Yamamoto		
2010	Hammer Session!	Suguru Kai		
2011	Sunshine	Hagiwara	Asadora	
2012	Taira no Kiyomori	Fujiwara no Norinaga	Taiga drama	
2012	Jun and Ai	Masakuni Yoneda	Asadora	
2017	Naotora: The Lady Warlord	Sekiguchi Ujitsune	Taiga drama	
2023	What Will You Do, Ieyasu?	Kira Yoshiakira	Taiga drama	
2024	Laughing Matryoshka	Ikuo Morohashi		
2025	Unbound	Honda Tadakazu	Taiga drama	
