= Yang Sok-il =

Zainichi Korean writer (1936–2024)

- Hangul: 양석일
- Hanja: 梁石日
- RR: Yang Seokil
- MR: Yang Sŏgil
- Japanese name: Yanagawa Masao (梁川正雄)

Yang Sok-il (or Yang Sokil, Yang Sogil, Yang Seok-il, 13 August 1936 – 29 June 2024) was a writer in Japanese of Korean nationality. He was born in Osaka.

== Life and works ==
Yang first supported himself via various odd jobs, an experience that led to books based on the experience of taxi driving published in the 1980s and filmed as All Under the Moon (月はどっちに出ている, Tsuki wa dotchi ni dete iru Yōichi Sai). A large number of books followed.

Yang's semi-autobiographical novel, Chi to Hone (Blood and Bones), was adapted as a theatrical film, directed by Yoichi Sai, starring Takeshi Kitano as Kim Shun-Pei, Kyōka Suzuki as Kim's wife, Joe Odagiri as son-in-law and Hirofumi Arai as eldest son and narrator. The film opened in Japan on 6 November 2004. An English version of the book translated by Adhy Kim was also published in 2022.

Yang died on 29 June 2024, at the age of 87.

== Recognition ==
The December 2000 issue of Yurīka (ユリイカ) / Eureka is devoted to Yang.
