= Tokyo Sports Film Award for Best Foreign Film =

Japanese film award

- Awarded for: Best Performance by a Foreign Film
- Country: Japan
- Presented by: Tokyo Sports
- First award: 1992
- Website: www.tokyo-sports.co.jp/tospo_movie/

The Tokyo Sports Film Award for Best Foreign Film is an award given at the Tokyo Sports Film Award.

== List of winners ==
No.	Year	Film	Director(s)
1	1991	N/A	N/A
2	1992	Last Tango in Paris	Bernardo Bertolucci
3	1993	N/A	N/A
4	1994	Through the Olive Trees	Abbas Kiarostami
5	1995	Forrest Gump	Robert Zemeckis
6	1996	Secrets & Lies	Mike Leigh
7	1997	Everyone Says I Love You	Woody Allen
8	1998	L.A. Confidential	Curtis Hanson
9	1999	Buffalo '66	Vincent Gallo
10	2000	The Road Home	Zhang Yimou
11	2001	Traffic	Steven Soderbergh
12	2002	Shaolin Soccer	Stephen Chow
13	2003	Kill Bill	Quentin Tarantino
14	2004	Oldboy	Park Chan-wook
15	2005	Million Dollar Baby	Clint Eastwood
16	2006	Flags of Our Fathers	Clint Eastwood
17	2007	Dreamgirls	Bill Condon
18	2008	No Country for Old Men	Joel Coen; Ethan Coen
19	2009	Michael Jackson's This Is It	Kenny Ortega
20	2010	District 9	Neill Blomkamp
21	2011	N/A	N/A
22	2012	Drive	Nicolas Winding Refn
23	2013	Gravity	Alfonso Cuarón
24	2014	Jersey Boys	Clint Eastwood
25	2015	Mad Max: Fury Road	George Miller
26	2016	Sully	Clint Eastwood
27	2017	La La Land	Damien Chazelle
28	2018	Bohemian Rhapsody	Bryan Singer
