= Life Back Then =

2011 Japanese film by Takahisa Zeze

- Film poster
- Directed by: Takahisa Zeze
- Written by: Masashi Sada (novel)
- Distributed by: Shochiku
- Release date: 19 November 2011 (Japan)
- Running time: 131 minutes
- Country: Japan
- Language: Japanese
- Box office: US$1,194,047

Life Back Then (Japanese: アントキノイノチ, Hepburn: Antoki no Inochi) is a 2012 Japanese film directed by Takahisa Zeze. It is based on the novel of the same name by Masashi Sada.

== Cast ==
- Masaki Okada, as Kyohei Nagashima
- Nana Eikura, as Yuki Kubota
- Taizo Harada, as coworker Saso
- Tori Matsuzaka, as Shintaro Matsui
- Akira Emoto, Masashi Inoue
- Shingo Tsurumi, as Atsushi Furuta
- Kanji Tsuda
- Yoshiko Miyazaki, as Michiko

== Filming ==
Filming was scheduled to commence in March 2011 at locations in Yamaguchi Prefecture, Shizuoka Prefecture, and Tokyo. Filming was completed by the end of April 2011.

== Release ==
Life Back Then made its worldwide debut in the "World Competition" segment of the 35th Montreal World Film Festival. It made its premiere screening there on 19 August 2011. Furthermore, it was announced on 8 September 2011 that Life Back Then will be participating in the 24th Tokyo International Film Festival and the 16th Busan International Film Festival. In the 16th Busan International Film Festival, the film was showcased under the "A Window on Asian Cinema" program at the festival, which was held from 6 to 14 October 2011. It was also showcased at the Tokyo International Film Festival on 24 October 2011.

== Reception ==
=== Accolades ===
Year	Award	Category	Result	Recipient
2011	35th Montreal World Film Festival	Innovation Award	Won	Life Back Then
