= Sansei Shiomi =

Japanese actor (born 1948)

- 塩見 三省
- Born: January 12, 1948 (age 78); Ayabe City, Kyoto Prefecture, Japan
- Occupation: Actor
- Years active: 1978–present

Sansei Shiomi (塩見 三省, Shiomi Sansei; born 12 January 1948) is a Japanese actor.

== Career ==
Born in Kyoto Prefecture, Shiomi went to Doshisha University. He joined the theater troupe En in 1978 and soon also began appearing in film and television, mostly as a character actor. He won a Japan Movie Critics Award for best supporting actor for the film Ki no Umi (2004).

== Selected filmography ==
=== Film ===
- The Gentle 12 (1991)
- The City That Never Sleeps: Shinjuku Shark (1993)
- Love Letter (1995)
- Swallowtail (1996)
- Eureka (2000)
- Calmi Cuori Appassionati (2001)
- Go (2001)
- When the Last Sword Is Drawn (2003), Kondō Isami
- Blood and Bones (2004)
- Ki no Umi (2004)
- Tokyo Tower: Mom and Me, and Sometimes Dad (2007)
- The Battery (2007)
- Like a Dragon (2007)
- Sukiyaki Western Django (2007)
- Crows Zero (2007)
- Tokyo Rendezvous (2008)
- Children of the Dark (2008)
- Asahiyama Zoo Story: Penguins in the Sky (2009)
- Villain (2010)
- A Song I Remember (2011)
- Hoshi Mamoru Inu (2011)
- Outrage Beyond (2012)
- A Chorus of Angels (2012)
- Girl in the Sunny Place (2013)
- Outrage Coda (2017)
- Show Me the Way to the Station (2019)
- First Love (2019)
- The Voice of Sin (2020)
- The Solitary Gourmet (2025), Ichirō Matsuo
- A Moon in the Ordinary (2025), Taichi Kodama

=== Television ===
- Oretachi wa Tenshi da! (1979)
- Taiheiki (1991), Kō no Moroyasu
- Ruri no Shima (2005)
- Kitaro ga Mita Gyokusai – Mizuki Shigeru no Senso (2007)
- School (2011)
- Saiko no Jinsei (2012)
- Amachan (2013)
- Gunshi Kanbei (2014), Mori Kohei
- Idaten (2019), Inukai Tsuyoshi
