= Nikkan Sports Film Award for Best Supporting Actress =

Annual Japanese film award

- Awarded for: Best Performance by a Supporting Actress
- Country: Japan
- Presented by: Nikkan Sports
- First award: 1988
- Website: www.nikkansports.com/entertainment/award/ns-cinema/top-ns-cinema.html

The Nikkan Sports Film Award for Best Supporting Actress is an award given at the Nikkan Sports Film Award.

== List of winners ==
No.	Year	Actress	Film(s)
1	1988	Kumiko Akiyoshi	Tora-san Plays Daddy; The Discarnates
2	1989	Kaho Minami	Yumemi Dōri no Hitobito; Hotaru
3	1990	Mayumi Ogawa	Isan Sōzoku; Shiroi Te
4	1991	Emi Wakui	My Sons; No Worries on the Recruit Front
5	1992	Tamao Nakamura	The River with No Bridge
6	1993	Keiko Takeshita	A Class to Remember
7	1994	Keiko Saitō	Shinonomerō Onna no Ran
8	1995	Yūko Natori	Marks no Yama
9	1996	Reiko Kusamura	Shall We Dance?
10	1997	Kyōka Suzuki	Welcome Back, Mr. McDonald
11	1998	Mitsuko Baisho	Hisai; Love Letter
12	1999	Yūko Tanaka	Ojuken; Osaka Story
13	2000	Michiyo Okusu	Face
14	2001	Yūki Amami	Rendan
15	2002	Rie Miyazawa	The Twilight Samurai
16	2003	Kaoru Yachigusa	Like Asura
17	2004	Kyōka Suzuki	Blood and Bones
18	2005	Hiroko Yakushimaru	Always Sanchōme no Yūhi
19	2006	Sumiko Fuji	Hula Girls
20	2007	Kirin Kiki	Tokyo Tower: Mom and Me, and Sometimes Dad
21	2008	Yui Natsukawa	Still Walking
22	2009	Kimiko Yo	Dear Doctor
23	2010	Yū Aoi	Otōto
24	2011	Mariko Kaga	Patisserie Coin de rue Kamisama no Karute
25	2012	Kirin Kiki	Chronicle of My Mother; Tsunagu
26	2013	Ran Ito	A Boy Called H
27	2014	Ryōko Hirosue	Omoinokoshi; Snow on the Blades
28	2015	Masami Nagasawa	Our Little Sister
29	2016	Aoi Miyazaki	Rage; If Cats Disappeared from the World
30	2017	Machiko Ono	Miracles of the Namiya General Store
31	2018	Kirin Kiki	Shoplifters; Mori, The Artist's Habitat; Every Day A Good Day
32	2019	Mikako Ichikawa	Dad, Chibi is Gone; A Girl Missing
33	2020	Makiko Watanabe	The Asadas; 37 Seconds
34	2021	Kaya Kiyohara	In the Wake
35	2022	Nana Seino	Kingdom 2: Far and Away; Offbeat Cops; A Man
36	2023	Fumi Nikaido	The Moon
37	2024	Anna Yamada	Golden Kamuy; Faceless
38	2025	Kumi Takiuchi	Kokuho; How Dare You? Hero's Island; Teki Cometh; Ravens
