= Sukiyaki Western Django =

2007 film

- Japanese release poster
- Directed by: Takashi Miike
- Written by: Masaru Nakamura; Takashi Miike
- Produced by: Kohei Yoshida; Toshinori Yamaguchi
- Starring: Hideaki Itō; Kōichi Satō; Yusuke Iseya; Masanobu Andō; Masato Sakai; Yoji Tanaka; Renji Ishibashi; Sansei Shiomi; Takaaki Ishibashi; Shun Oguri; Quentin Tarantino; Yutaka Matsushige; Yoshino Kimura; Teruyuki Kagawa; Kaori Momoi
- Cinematography: Toyomichi Kurita
- Edited by: Taiji Shimamura
- Music by: Kōji Endō
- Production companies: Sedic International; Geneon Universal Entertainment; Sony Pictures Entertainment; Dentsu; TV Asahi; Shogakukan; A-Team; Nagoya Broadcasting Network; Tokyu Recreation
- Distributed by: Sony Pictures Entertainment
- Release dates: 5 September 2007 (Venice); 15 September 2007 (Japan)
- Running time: 121 minutes
- Country: Japan
- Language: English
- Budget: $3.8 million
- Box office: $2.7 million

Sukiyaki Western Django (スキヤキ・ウエスタン ジャンゴ, Sukiyaki Uesutan Jango) is a 2007 English-language Japanese Western film directed and co-written by Takashi Miike. The film features an ensemble cast, including Hideaki Itō, Kōichi Satō, Yūsuke Iseya, Masanobu Andō, Masato Sakai, Yoji Tanaka, Renji Ishibashi, Sansei Shiomi, Takaaki Ishibashi, Shun Oguri, Quentin Tarantino, Yutaka Matsushige, Yoshino Kimura, Teruyuki Kagawa and Kaori Momoi.

The title refers to the Japanese dish sukiyaki as well as Sergio Corbucci's Spaghetti Western film Django, with additional inspiration from the "Man with No Name" stock character variously used in the Spaghetti Western genre but most notably in the Dollars trilogy by Sergio Leone (initially inspired by Akira Kurosawa's jidaigeki film Yojimbo).

== Plot ==
A lone gunman travels to the town of Yuta, which is run by the warring clans of the white-colored Genji and red-colored Heike. After ignoring requests from both clans to join them, he is given shelter by a woman named Ruriko, who takes care of her mute grandson Heihachi. Ruriko tells the gunman that many years ago, the town prospered in gold mining until both clans fought over the gold and drove away the population. The Heike-aligned sheriff tells the gunman that in the midst of the chaos, a Heike man named Akira married a Genji woman named Shizuka and lived peacefully with their son Heihachi, until Heike leader Kiyomori killed Akira in cold blood, rendering Heihachi mute from the trauma. Seeking protection for her son, Shizuka became a prostitute for the Genji. Since then, Heihachi has been tending to a trio of red and white roses, waiting for the day they bloom.

Later that day, the gunman wins a challenge from the Genji henchman Yoichi to have Shizuka for the night. Before he proceeds with her, he is told by Genji leader Yoshitsune that he is reminiscent of the legendary female gunslinger Bloody Benten. Later, Shizuka warns the gunman that Yoshitsune sent some men to retrieve a new weapon for Yoichi to use on him. He tells Shizuka to take her son and leave town tomorrow. The next morning, following a tip-off from Shizuka, the sheriff informs Kiyomori of the Genjis' plans. The Heikes ambush the wagon, with Kiyomori acquiring a Gatling gun stored inside a coffin. Meanwhile, as the Genjis race toward the wagon raid, Ruriko, Shizuka and Heihachi are fleeing from town when Shizuka runs back to save the roses. She is mortally shot through the heart by Yoichi. The gunman attempts to intervene, but is forced to drop his guns before being tortured by the Genji thug. Ruriko's servant Toshio suddenly appears and throws a gun at her before she shoots and kills Yoichi and his henchmen, revealing herself to be Bloody Benten. In retaliation for the wagon raid, the Genjis destroy the Heikes' fortress.

While the native doctor Piripero tends to the gunman's wounds, Ruriko has Toshio retrieve some guns from the elderly Piringo, who reveals to him that he trained her to be a gunman and Akira was their son. Ruriko plans to settle the score with the Genjis once and for all by luring them with a chest loaded with gold nuggets in the middle of town. The Genjis are killed by the gunman and Ruriko while the surviving Heikes make their way back to town. Ruriko kills the Heikes and Kiyomori, avenging her son's death, but is fatally shot by the sheriff, who in turn is shot down by a mortally wounded Toshio and impaled with a tombstone cross by Piripero. The gunman challenges Yoshitsune in a final showdown, with the Genji leader deflecting all the gunman's bullets with his katana. But when Yoshitsune tries to deliver a fatal cut, the gunman catches the blade on his trigger guard, before shooting Yoshitsune in the head with a Derringer he had concealed under his left sleeve.

After burying their loved ones, the gunman takes a fistful of gold from the treasure chest, telling Heihachi that the rest is his. Heihachi looks at the roses and slowly utters, "Love". The gunman turns to cheer the child Heihachi with some parting words before he rides off through the snow. The ending text reveals that years later, Heihachi travels to Italy and becomes the gunslinger known as "Django".

== Cast ==
- Hideaki Itō as The Gunman
- Kōichi Satō as Kiyomori
- Yūsuke Iseya as Yoshitsune
- Masanobu Andō as Yoichi
- Takaaki Ishibashi as Benkei
- Shun Oguri as Akira
- Masato Sakai as Shigemori
- Yoshino Kimura as Shizuka
- Teruyuki Kagawa as Sheriff Hoanka
- Kaori Momoi as Ruriko
- Yutaka Matsushige as Toshio
- Renji Ishibashi as Mura
- Yōji Tanaka as Munemori
- Sansei Shiomi as Piripero
- Quentin Tarantino as Piringo
- Ruka Uchida as Heihachi

== Production ==
=== Writing ===
Inspired by the historical rivalry between the Genji and Heike clans, which ushered in the era of samurai dominance in Japanese history, Sukiyaki Western Django is set "a few hundred years after the Genpei War". The Genji and Heike gangs face off in a town named "Yuta" in "Nevata", when a nameless gunman comes into town to help a prostitute get revenge on the warring gangs. The film contains numerous references both to the historical Genpei War and to the Wars of the Roses, as well as the films Yojimbo and Django.

The film was produced by Sedic International, Geneon Universal Entertainment, Sony Pictures Entertainment, Dentsu, TV Asahi, Shogakukan, A-Team, Nagoya Broadcasting Network and Tokyu Recreation.

=== Casting ===
The opening scene of the film in both the original version of the film and the re-edited version of the film includes a short segment featuring Quentin Tarantino, listed in the actor credits for the film, as a solo gunman gunning down several outlaws.

=== Soundtrack ===
The film's soundtrack composed by Kōji Endō was released on CD on September 5, 2007. It features "Django Wandering" (ジャンゴ〜さすらい〜, Jango ~Sasurai~), a Japanese remake of the original Django theme song by veteran enka singer Saburō Kitajima.

== Release ==
The original version of Sukiyaki Western Django had a running time of 121 minutes (2 hours and 1 minute) when it first premiered on 5 September 2007 at the Venice Film Festival and was released on 15 September 2007 in Japan. This was the version shown in Japanese cinemas and received mixed reviews from critics. For the North American premiere at the New York Asian Film Festival on 1 July 2008, Miike had the film edited down to 98 minutes (1 hour and 38 minutes). This was the version released outside Japan.

The DVD release of the film included a featurette of the film including the director and leading characters as filmed on the main set for the film which they called "Village Utah".

== Reception ==
=== Box office ===
The film did poorly at the box-office and was not able to recover its budget costs after its original release losing over one million dollars.

=== Critical response ===
When Sukiyaki Western Django premiered as part of the "Midnight Madness" program at the Toronto International Film Festival in its re-edited version, it received mixed reviews. Cam Lindsay of Exclaim! magazine wrote admiringly:

"The fast-paced action is well staged on a set that borrows from both western and samurai traditions; Miike mixes both good old gunplay (a Gatling gun that’s housed in the original film’s iconic coffin) and martial arts swordplay, which intermingle cohesively until the last fight. Perhaps the most remarkable aspect of Miike’s western is his decision to use a Japanese cast to speak English. Supported by English subtitles, it’s a peculiar choice that at first feels like a novelty, only to fade into the film’s absorbing environment. Sukiyaki Western Django feels very much like a genuine western, and with it Miike demonstrates his mastery of working a genre film until it becomes a creation of his very own."

The film holds an approval rating of 57% on Rotten Tomatoes, based on 53 reviews, with an average rating of 5.7/10. The website's critical consensus reads, "Inventive and off-kilter, the newest feast from J-Horror director Takashi Miike is super-sensory, self-referential and somewhat excessive." On Metacritic, the film has a weighted average score of 55 out of 100, based on 13 critics, indicating "mixed or average reviews".

== Manga ==
On June 8, 2007, a manga adaptation by Kotobuki Shiriagari began serialization in Shogakukan's Big Comic Superior.

== See also ==
- The Tale of the Heike
