= Nikkan Sports Film Award for Best Actor =

Annual Japanese film award

- Awarded for: Best Performance by an Actor
- Country: Japan
- Presented by: Nikkan Sports
- First award: 1988
- Website: www.nikkansports.com/entertainment/award/ns-cinema/top-ns-cinema.html

The Nikkan Sports Film Award for Best Actor is an award given at the Nikkan Sports Film Award.

== List of winners ==
No.	Year	Actor	Film(s)
1	1988	Kiyoshi Atsumi	Tora-san Plays Daddy
2	1989	Eiji Okuda	Death of a Tea Master
3	1990	Yoshio Harada	Roningai; Ready to Shoot
4	1991	Rentarō Mikuni	My Sons
5	1992	Yoshio Harada	Sosuke Loses His Lover
6	1993	Toshiyuki Nishida	A Class to Remember
7	1994	Kōichi Satō	Crest of Betrayal; Tokarefu
8	1995	Hiroyuki Sanada	Sharaku
9	1996	Kōji Yakusho	Shall We Dance?
10	1997	Tetsuya Watari	Yūkai
11	1998	Akira Emoto	Dr. Akagi
12	1999	Masahiro Motoki	Gemini
13	2000	Akira Terao	After the Rain
14	2001	Naoto Takenaka	Sanmon Yakusha; Rendan
15	2002	Hiroyuki Sanada	The Twilight Samurai
16	2003	Kiichi Nakai	When the Last Sword Is Drawn
17	2004	Takeshi Kitano	Blood and Bones
18	2005	Somegorō Ichikawa	The Samurai I Loved; Ashura
19	2006	Ken Watanabe	Memories of Tomorrow
20	2007	Takuya Kimura	Love and Honor
21	2008	Masahiro Nakai	Watashi wa Kai ni Naritai
22	2009	Shōfukutei Tsurube	Dear Doctor
23	2010	Satoshi Tsumabuki	Villain
24	2011	Kenichi Matsuyama	My Back Page
25	2012	Ken Takakura	Anata e
26	2013	Ryuhei Matsuda	The Great Passage
27	2014	Junichi Okada	The Eternal Zero; A Samurai Chronicle
28	2015	Kengo Kora	The Mourner; Being Good
29	2016	Kōichi Satō	64: Part I - Part II
30	2017	Masaki Suda	Wilderness; Kiseki: Sobito of That Day; Teiichi: Battle of Supreme High; Hibana: Spark
31	2018	Tori Matsuzaka	Call Boy; Impossibility Defense
32	2019	Sosuke Ikematsu	Miyamoto
33	2020	Shun Oguri	The Voice of Sin
34	2021	Hidetoshi Nishijima	Drive My Car; What Did You Eat Yesterday?
35	2022	Hiroshi Abe	Tombi: Father and Son; Offbeat Cops
36	2023	Ryohei Suzuki	Egoist; Tokyo MER: Mobile Emergency Room – The Movie
37	2024	Makiya Yamaguchi	A Samurai in Time
38	2025	Ryo Yoshizawa	Kokuho; Babanba Banban Vampire
