= Nikkan Sports Film Award for Best Film =

Annual Japanese film award

- Awarded for: Best Performance by a Film
- Country: Japan
- Presented by: Nikkan Sports
- First award: 1988
- Website: www.nikkansports.com/entertainment/award/ns-cinema/top-ns-cinema.html

The Nikkan Sports Film Award for Best Film is an award given at the Nikkan Sports Film Award.

== List of winners ==
No.	Year	Film	Director
1	1988	A Chaos of Flowers	Kinji Fukasaku
2	1989	Black Rain	Shohei Imamura
3	1990	Childhood Days	Masahiro Shinoda
4	1991	My Sons	Yoji Yamada
5	1992	Sumo Do, Sumo Don't	Masayuki Suo
6	1993	A Class to Remember	Yoji Yamada
7	1994	Crest of Betrayal	Kinji Fukasaku
8	1995	Sharaku	Masahiro Shinoda
9	1996	Shall We Dance?	Masayuki Suo
10	1997	Aisuru	Kei Kumai
11	1998	Begging for Love	Hideyuki Hirayama
12	1999	Poppoya	Yasuo Furuhata
13	2000	15 Sai Gakkō IV	Yoji Yamada
14	2001	Spirited Away	Hayao Miyazaki
15	2002	The Twilight Samurai	Yoji Yamada
16	2003	Like Asura	Yoshimitsu Morita
17	2004	Blood and Bones	Yoichi Sai
18	2005	Break Through!	Kazuyuki Izutsu
19	2006	Hula Girls	Lee Sang-il
20	2007	I Just Didn't Do It	Masayuki Suo
21	2008	Departures	Yōjirō Takita
22	2009	Dear Doctor	Miwa Nishikawa
23	2010	Villain	Lee Sang-il
24	2011	Postcard	Kaneto Shindo
25	2012	A Terminal Trust	Masayuki Suo
26	2013	The Great Passage	Yuya Ishii
27	2014	The Eternal Zero	Takashi Yamazaki
28	2015	Solomon's Perjury	Izuru Narushima
29	2016	64: Part I - Part II	Takahisa Zeze
30	2017	Wilderness	Yoshiyuki Kishi
31	2018	Shoplifters	Hirokazu Kore-eda
32	2019	The Journalist	Michihito Fujii
33	2020	The Voice of Sin	Nobuhiro Doi
34	2021	Drive My Car	Ryusuke Hamaguchi
35	2022	Anime Supremacy!	Kōhei Yoshino
36	2023	The Moon	Yuya Ishii
37	2024	A Samurai in Time	Jun'ichi Yasuda
38	2025	Kokuho	Lee Sang-il
