= Beyond Outrage =

2012 Japanese yakuza film

- US Theatrical release poster
- Directed by: Takeshi Kitano
- Written by: Takeshi Kitano
- Produced by: Masayuki Mori; Takio Yoshida
- Starring: Beat Takeshi; Toshiyuki Nishida; Tomokazu Miura
- Cinematography: Katsumi Yanagishima
- Edited by: Takeshi Kitano; Yoshinori Ota
- Music by: Keiichi Suzuki
- Production companies: Bandai Visual; Office Kitano; TV Tokyo
- Distributed by: Warner Bros. Pictures
- Release dates: September 2, 2012 (Venice Film Festival); October 6, 2012 (Japan)
- Running time: 112 minutes
- Country: Japan
- Language: Japanese
- Box office: US$16,211,978

Beyond Outrage (Japanese: アウトレイジ ビヨンド, Hepburn: Autoreiji Biyondo) is a 2012 Japanese yakuza film directed by and starring Takeshi Kitano, with Toshiyuki Nishida, and Tomokazu Miura. It is a sequel to Kitano's 2010 film Outrage and was followed by the 2017 film Outrage Coda.

== Plot summary ==
Five years have passed since the events of Outrage. Otomo, former Yakuza of the Sanno-kai crime syndicate, is presumed dead after being stabbed in prison by Kimura, whose clan Otomo helped destroy. Sekiuchi, chairman of the Sanno-Kai, was assassinated and succeeded by his underboss Kato, who has completely overhauled the syndicate to involve more legitimate businesses and build influence among high-ranking government officials, overseen by Ishihara, Otomo's treasurer and betrayer. However, Kato's emphasis on a system of modernization and profit-based promotion offends and concerns the more senior bosses, who are continually passed over in favor of younger, more profitable members and fear becoming obsolete.

The murder of an anti-corruption cop unnerves his colleagues, who know he was investigating corruption on the part of a Land Minister in league with the Sanno-kai. The anti-corruption department decides the Sanno-kai has become dangerously powerful and must be dismantled. To that end, they call in detective Kataoka, whose well-known ties among the yakuza allowed him to orchestrate much of the events of the first film. Corrupt and self-serving, Kataoka decides to instigate a war between the Sanno-Kai and the Hanabishi-kai from western Japan, in the hopes they will destroy each other. He convinces Tomita, one of the most senior and vocally resentful Sanno-kai bosses, to meet with Fuse, chairman of the Osaka branch of the Hanabishi-kai, about forcing Kato to retire. Fuse, concerned Tomita lacks the support needed to mount a takeover, reports him to Kato, who kills him as a lesson to other dissenters.

Kataoka turns to Otomo, whose death was just a rumor spread by Kataoka; he has spent the last five years in a maximum security prison. Kimura, his nemesis, has been released and struggles to adjust to civilian life as the owner of a batting cage. Kataoka has Otomo's sentence commuted and secures his early parole, while informing Kato and Ishihara he is still alive. A paranoid Ishihara hires assassins to kill Otomo, while Kataoka has him meet with Kimura. Time has caused the animosity between the two to turn into remorse, and Kimura expresses interest in joining forces to get revenge on those who betrayed them. Otomo knows they are being manipulated by Kataoka and wants no part of it. He is contacted by a childhood friend, Chang Dae-sung, who is now an underworld fixer for gangs in both Japan and Korea and offers him a place in his employment; Otomo promises to consider it. When one of Ishihara's assassins nearly kills him, however, Otomo realizes he will never be left alone and agrees to partner with Kimura.

With the tacit approval of the Hanabishi-kai, Otomo and Kimura carry out a ruthless and bloody rampage through the ranks of the Sanno-kai. Kato's inability to stop the attacks causes increasing dissent in his syndicate, and the senior bosses are further manipulated by the Hanabishi-kai. Fuse also reveals he knows the truth about Sekiuchi's murder, using it as leverage. Kimura captures Ishihara, whom Otomo ties to a chair to be beaten to death by a pitching machine. Eventually all but a few of the Sanno-Kai bosses demand that Kato retire. Pressured by Fuse, he makes a public statement to the police taking responsibility for the war and Sekiuchi's murder, which is an enormous boost to Kataoka's career. Kimura decides to make a pact with Fuse, but Otomo, warned by Chang that both syndicates deem the two of them expendable, declares himself finished with the war and leaves. Kato, reduced to a mere civilian, is personally assassinated by Otomo at a pachinko parlor. The Sanno-Kai, decimated by the war, is absorbed into the Hanabishi-kai, making it almost omnipotent in central Japan. After a police raid led by Kataoka leaves him defenseless, Kimura is killed by one of Kato's surviving and most loyal bodyguards (who had been given items found on Kato's corpse by Kataoka) and another hitman, who pass themselves off as delivery men for a gift from one of Otomo's offices - leaving behind a visit card to incriminate Otomo. The Hanabishi-kai and Sanno-kai bosses gather at Kimura's funeral service, observed by Kataoka and Shigeta, who, remaining suspicious of the part played by Kataoka in this whole story, leaves in disgust. Otomo arrives, intending to pay his respects; Kataoka, knowing both clans want Otomo dead, gives him a gun. But by now Otomo knows the war was entirely his doing, and shoots him.

== Cast ==
- Takeshi Kitano (Beat Takeshi) as Otomo
- Tomokazu Miura as Kato
- Ryo Kase as Ishihara
- Fumiyo Kohinata as Detective Kataoka
- Yutaka Matsushige as Detective Shigeta
- Toshiyuki Nishida as Nishino
- Sansei Shiomi as Nakata
- Shigeru Kōyama as Fuse
- Katsunori Takahashi as Jo
- Akira Nakao as Tomita
- Tetsushi Tanaka as Funaki
- Ken Mitsuishi as Gomi
- Tatsuo Nadaka as Shiroyama
- Shun Sugata as Okamoto
- Hideo Nakano as Kimura
- Hirofumi Arai as Ono
- Kenta Kiritani as Shima
- Tokio Kaneda as Chang Dae-sung (Mr. Chang), Korean fixer
- Hakuryu as Mr. Chang's bodyguard

== Release ==
Beyond Outrage was screened in competition at the 69th Venice International Film Festival.

== Soundtrack ==
Kitano returned to Keiichi Suzuki, the same Japanese composer he had used for the original Outrage film, for the complete sequel soundtrack, and previously Kitano had collaborated with him for the complete soundtrack to his Zatoichi film. This complete soundtrack for Beyond Outrage was their third film collaboration.

== Reception ==
Beyond Outrage has an approval rating of 50% on review aggregator website Rotten Tomatoes, based on 18 reviews, and an average rating of 5.9/10. Metacritic assigned the film a weighted average score of 53 out of 100, based on 12 critics, indicating "mixed or average reviews".

Gabe Toro of IndieWire gave Beyond Outrage an "A−" rating. Justin Chang of Variety described the film as "a slow-motion deathtrap in which the wall-to-wall chatter feels like a joyless, too-leisurely distraction from the inevitable bloodletting". Meanwhile, he commented that Otomo (Beat Takeshi) is "the most memorable figure here, a demon of death shown to brook no nonsense in the film's blunt, perfect final scene". Lee Marshall of Screen International said: "Out-and-out shouting matches between supposedly composed clan members are another forte of Outrage Beyond – a film that always has humour bubbling just underneath its hard-boiled surface".

Kinema Junpo placed Beyond Outrage at number 3 in their "10 Best Japanese Films of 2012", while it was ranked at number 36 on the Film Comment's "50 Best Undistributed Films of 2012".

The film became a box office success. As of 30 June 2013, Box Office Mojo reported a total revenue for Outrage approaching USD ten million with US$8,383,891 in the total worldwide lifetime box office. Beyond Outrage had receipts more than twice as high, at US$16,995,152.

== Sequel ==
A sequel, Outrage Coda, the final installment of Outrage trilogy, was released in October 2017. Takeshi Kitano directed and starred in the film.
