= Hana-bi =

1997 Japanese film by Takeshi Kitano

- Theatrical release poster
- Directed by: Takeshi Kitano
- Written by: Takeshi Kitano
- Produced by: Masayuki Mori; Yasushi Tsuge; Takio Yoshida
- Starring: Beat Takeshi; Kayoko Kishimoto; Ren Osugi; Susumu Terajima
- Cinematography: Hideo Yamamoto
- Edited by: Takeshi Kitano; Yoshinori Ota
- Music by: Joe Hisaishi
- Production companies: Bandai Visual; Office Kitano; Tokyo FM; TV Tokyo
- Distributed by: Nippon Herald Films
- Release dates: September 3, 1997 (Venice Film Festival); January 24, 1998 (Japan)
- Running time: 103 minutes
- Country: Japan
- Language: Japanese
- Budget: $2.3 million

Hana-bi (lit. 'Fireworks'), released in the United States as Fireworks, is a 1997 Japanese crime drama film written, directed and edited by Takeshi Kitano, who also stars in it. The film's score was composed by Joe Hisaishi in his fourth collaboration with Kitano.

Hana-bi received critical acclaim and won the Golden Lion at the 54th Venice International Film Festival, helping to establish Kitano as an internationally acclaimed filmmaker; the film has developed a cult following.

== Plot ==
Yoshitaka Nishi is a violent former police detective who had to retire after a tragic accident during a botched arrest in which another detective, Tanaka, was killed by the suspect while two others, Nakamura and Horibe, were severely injured. Becoming unemployed, Nishi spends most of his time taking care of his sick wife Miyuki, who has terminal leukemia. To pay for his wife's care, Nishi borrows money from the yakuza but is having difficulty repaying them.

Meanwhile, Horibe, who has been paralyzed since the incident, suffers deep depression after his wife and daughter leave him. In a conversation with Nishi, Horibe hints at committing suicide, while adding that he would like to paint but cannot afford to buy himself the necessary materials. After a botched suicide attempt, Horibe receives art supplies mailed to him by Nishi. He then takes up painting and creates surreal works of art, and later in a pointillist style.

Nishi buys a second-hand taxicab and repaints it in police colors. He arms himself with a revolver and robs a bank dressed as a policeman. Using the money, he pays off the yakuza and gives some to Tanaka's widow. Nishi then leaves with his wife for a road trip. Nakamura learns from Tanaka's widow about the gift and advises her to keep the money. He also learns about the paints for Horibe and soon realizes who committed the robbery. Nakamura and his partner attempt to reach Nishi, eventually tracing his route as he and his wife embark on their trip.

Meanwhile, even though Nishi has paid his debt to them, the yakuza deduce Nishi committed the robbery and attempt to extort additional money from him. The yakuza track down and confront Nishi, but he kills them all in a violent shootout. The next day, Nishi and his wife are at a beach when they are found by Nakamura and his partner. They prepare to arrest Nishi, but Nishi asks Nakamura to spare him a moment of time, watching a girl trying to fly a kite. The couple comforts each other before the camera pans away towards the ocean before two gunshots are heard in the distance.

== Cast ==
- Takeshi Kitano as Yoshitaka Nishi
- Kayoko Kishimoto as Miyuki, Nishi's wife
- Ren Osugi as Horibe
- Susumu Terajima as Nakamura
- Tetsu Watanabe as Tesuka
- Hakuryu as Yakuza Hitman
- Yasuei Yakushiji as Criminal
- Taro Itsumi as Kudo
- Kenichi Yajima as Doctor
- Makoto Ashikawa as Tanaka
- Yūko Daike as Tanaka's widow

== Production ==
In the film, Horibe takes up painting in the pointillist style in order to compensate for his paralysis. In reality, these paintings were painted by Kitano himself, whilst in recovery from an infamous motorcycle accident in August 1994 that left half of his face paralyzed.

Kitano's daughter and former singer, Shoko Kitano, makes a cameo appearance playing a nameless girl flying a kite in the film's closing scenes.

The film's title is sometimes listed as "Hana-bi", "hana-bi" or "Hanabi" on the covers of international DVD releases and other references to the film in the West. However, the official title is actually HANA-BI, fully capitalized, and is used on all Japanese licensed products, including theatrical posters, video covers and OST covers.

== Soundtrack ==
Hana-bi
- Polydor cover

Soundtrack album by Joe Hisaishi
- Released: January 1, 1998
- Genres: Soundtrack, modern classical, downtempo
- Length: 42:14
- Labels: Polydor, Milan Records

Alternative cover
- Milan Records cover

The soundtrack CD was first released in 1998 and 1999 by Milan Records, then reissued by Polydor.

=== Track listing ===
All compositions by Joe Hisaishi.

1. "Hana-bi" – 3:42
2. "Angel" – 2:41
3. "Sea of Blue" – 3:29
4. "...and Alone" – 2:29
5. "Ever Love" – 2:15
6. "Painters" – 5:57
7. "Smile and Smile" – 2:55
8. "Heaven's Gate" – 4:59
9. "Tenderness" – 2:31
10. "Thank You... for Everything" – 7:09
11. "Hana-bi (Reprise)" – 3:41

=== Credits ===
- Bassoon – Shinkichi Maeda
- Clarinet – Tadashi Hoshino
- Composer, arranger, performer – Joe Hisaishi
- Flute – Takashi Asahi, Takeshi Shinohara
- Harmonica – Nobuo Yagi
- Oboe – Hiroshi Shibayama
- Strings – Yuichiro Goto Group

== Reception ==
Although it was not a big success financially, Hana-bi received critical acclaim and won the Golden Lion award at the 54th Venice International Film Festival and numerous other accolades. Kitano himself said it was not until he won the Golden Lion that he was accepted as a serious director in his native Japan; his prior films had been looked at as just the hobby of a famous comedian.

It also won the Grand Prix of the Belgian Syndicate of Cinema Critics.

Review aggregator Rotten Tomatoes reports that 96% of 24 critics have given the film a positive review, with a rating average of 8.4 out of 10. Metacritic assigned the film a weighted average score of 83 out of 100, based on 17 critics, indicating "universal acclaim". American film critic Roger Ebert rated it three stars out of four, citing its unusual approach toward serenity and brutality, calling it "a Charles Bronson Death Wish movie so drained of story, cliché, convention and plot that nothing is left, except pure form and impulse." Jaime N. Christley of Slant Magazine gave the film a perfect four star rating. David Stratton of The Movie Show called Hana-bi "an unclassifiable film" and "quite extraordinary," with co-host Margaret Pomeranz stating "I was ultimately so moved by it. It did what cinema is meant to do, for me anyway, and that's take me on a journey that is mine, that ultimately ends up inside me, in my heart." Stratton concluded that Hana-bi is "hard to describe to audiences, but all I can say is: Go and see it. It's great." The duo both awarded the film five stars out of five.

== Legacy ==
The film is included in the book 1001 Movies You Must See Before You Die.
