= Nikkan Sports Film Awards =

Nikkan Sports Film Award
- Awarded for: Excellence in film making
- Country: Japan
- Presented by: Nikkan Sports
- First award: 1988
- Website: www.nikkansports.com/entertainment/award/ns-cinema/top-ns-cinema.html

The Nikkan Sports Film Awards (日刊スポーツ映画大賞, Nikkan Supōtsu Eiga Taishō), also called the Nikkan Sports Yujiro Ishihara Film Prizes, are annual film-specific prizes awarded by the Nikkan Sports newspaper since 1988.

The categories of Fans' Choice Award for Best Film and Fans' Choice Award for Best Actor were introduced in 2021 with the 34th edition of the awards.

== Categories ==
- Best Film
- Best Foreign Film
- Best Director
- Best Actor
- Best Actress
- Best Supporting Actor
- Best Supporting Actress
- Best Newcomer
- Special Award
- Yūjirō Ishihara Award
- Yūjirō Ishihara Newcomer Award
- Fans' Choice Award for Best Film
- Fans' Choice Award for Best Actor
