= Tokyo Sports Film Award =

- Awarded for: Excellence in film making
- Country: Japan
- Presented by: Tokyo Sports
- First award: 1991
- Website: http://www.tokyo-sports.co.jp/tospo_movie/

The Tokyo Sports Film Award (東京スポーツ映画大賞, Tōkyō Supōtsu Eiga Taishō) are film-specific prizes awarded solely by the Tokyo Sports.

== History ==
The Tokyo Sports Film Award's winners are decided solely by Takeshi Kitano's "personal discretion and prejudice." Initially, the selections were like a joke and entertained the public, but as Kitano's reputation as a film director grew, the award also gained attention from film fans. Although the reason has not been clearly stated, the award has not been held since 2019.

== Categories ==
There are following categories:

- Best Film
- Best Actor
- Best Actress
- Best Supporting Actor
- Best Supporting Actress
- Best Director
- Best Newcomer
- Best Foreign Film
- Special Award
- Special Film Award

== See also ==
- Japanese Adult Video Awards
