= Outrage (2010 film) =

2010 Japanese film by Takeshi Kitano

- Theatrical release poster
- Directed by: Takeshi Kitano
- Written by: Takeshi Kitano
- Produced by: Masayuki Mori; Takio Yoshida
- Starring: Beat Takeshi; Kippei Shiina; Ryo Kase; Tomokazu Miura; Jun Kunimura
- Cinematography: Katsumi Yanagishima
- Edited by: Takeshi Kitano; Yoshinori Ota
- Music by: Keiichi Suzuki
- Production companies: Bandai Visual; Office Kitano; Omnibus Promotion; TV Tokyo; Tokyo FM
- Distributed by: Warner Bros. Pictures Japan
- Release dates: 17 May 2010 (Cannes); 12 June 2010 (Japan)
- Running time: 109 minutes
- Country: Japan
- Languages: Japanese; English
- Box office: ¥634 million

Outrage (Japanese: アウトレイジ, Hepburn: Autoreiji) is a 2010 Japanese yakuza film written, directed, co-edited and starring Takeshi Kitano. It competed for the Palme d'Or at the 2010 Cannes Film Festival. It is followed by Beyond Outrage (2012) and Outrage Coda (2017).

== Plot ==
The film begins with a sumptuous banquet at the opulent estate of the Grand Yakuza leader Sekiuchi (Soichiro Kitamura), boss of the Sanno-kai, a huge organized crime syndicate controlling the entire Kanto region. He has invited the many Yakuza leaders under his control. After the formal conclusion of the banquet, Kato, the chief lieutenant of Sekiuchi, pulls one of the Yakuza leaders, Ikemoto, aside and makes plain that he is displeased with the news that Ikemoto has become friendly with a rival gang leader, Murase, while the two were unexpectedly imprisoned together. Kato, underboss of the Sanno-kai, orders Ikemoto to bring the unassociated Murase-gumi gang in line, and Ikemoto immediately passes the task on to his subordinate Otomo (Beat Takeshi), who runs his own crew.

Shortly thereafter an incident occurs at a nightclub owned by Murase where a man posing as a customer is inadvertently put through a shakedown for about one million yen. It turns out that this is a member of the Otomo family who has been planted into the nightclub in order to help set-off the conditions for an all-out gang war against the Murase family. Murase, who is completely in the dark concerning his having fallen out of favor with Sekiuchi, tries to ameliorate the situation by relying on his former prison friendship with Ikemoto, not knowing that Ikemoto is under orders to terminate his gang. He accepts Ikemoto's advice several times not suspecting any ill-intentions from Ikemoto and each time he further weakens his strength, his resources and his crime family. In one incident, Otomo leaves vicious scars on the face of Kimura who is Murase's chief lieutenant.

When the dust finally settles from the escalated tensions, Ikemoto and Murase are killed, Otomo is in a maximum security prison, unexpectedly with Kimura, and is stabbed twice in a prison ambush by Kimura in the belly with a makeshift knife. The complex interactions in the film finally come full circle and the film ends with Kato secretly killing Sekiuchi and taking control as the new Grand Yakuza leader of the Sanno-kai organized crime syndicate.

== Cast ==
- Takeshi Kitano (Beat Takeshi) as Otomo
- Kippei Shiina as Mizuno
- Ryo Kase as Ishihara
- Tomokazu Miura as Kato
- Jun Kunimura as Ikemoto
- Tetta Sugimoto as Ozawa
- Takashi Tsukamoto as Iizuka
- Eihi Shiina as Jun
- Hideo Nakano as Kimura
- Renji Ishibashi as Murase
- Fumiyo Kohinata as Detective Kataoka
- Soichiro Kitamura as Sekiuchi
- Yuka Itaya as Otomo's girlfriend
- Naoko Watanabe as Mizuno's girlfriend

== Production ==
Following a string of more unconventional films with limited commercial success, Takeshi Kitano decided to make Outrage as a film with no other ambition than to be entertaining. He was reluctant to label it as a return to his roots but referred to yakuza films as "a genre for which I have talent". When writing the screenplay, Kitano started by inventing the ways in which characters would be killed in the film, and thereafter wrote a story that would go along with the violence. The film was produced by Office Kitano with Bandai Visual, TV Tokyo and Omnibus Japan. Per the producer's suggestion no actors who had appeared in earlier Kitano films were cast, with the director himself as an exception. It was shot in CinemaScope from 23 August to 23 October 2009. Filming locations included Kobe and Ibaraki Prefecture.

== Release ==
The film premiered in competition at the 2010 Cannes Film Festival where it was screened on 17 May. The Japanese premiere followed on 12 June through a collaboration between Office Kitano and the Japanese subsidiary of Warner Bros. The film had a revenue of 1,597,856 dollars (146,363,610 yen) from 155 screens during the opening weekend, which made it the fourth highest-grossing film in Japan that week. As of 4 July 2010, Box Office Mojo reported a total revenue of 7,230,528 dollars (634,117,307 yen) in the domestic market.

== Reception ==
Outrage has an approval rating of 80% on review aggregator website Rotten Tomatoes, based on 46 reviews, and an average rating of 6.8/10. The website's critical consensus states: "Outrage packs enough violent impact to satisfy - even if fans of writer-director Takeshi Kitano will find themselves familiar with many of its ingredients". Metacritic assigned the film a weighted average score of 67 out of 100, based on 19 critics, indicating "generally favorable reviews".

Keith Phipps of The A.V. Club gave the film a "C", and Kevin Jagernauth of IndieWire gave the film a "C−" rating. Rob Nelson of Variety described the film as "a beautifully staged marvel that confidently reasserts Kitano's considerable cinematic gifts".
