= Blood and Bones =

2004 Japanese film by Yōichi Sai

- Theatrical release poster
- Directed by: Yoichi Sai
- Screenplay by: Yoichi Sai; Wui-Sin Chong
- Based on: Chi to Hone by Yan Sogiru
- Produced by: Nozomu Enoki
- Starring: Takeshi Kitano; Kyōka Suzuki; Joe Odagiri
- Cinematography: Takeshi Hamada
- Edited by: Yoshiyuki Okuhara
- Music by: Tarō Iwashiro
- Release date: 6 November 2004 (Japan)
- Running time: 140 minutes
- Country: Japan
- Languages: Japanese; Korean

Blood and Bones (Japanese: 血と骨, Hepburn: Chi to Hone) is a 2004 Japanese drama film directed by Yoichi Sai and starring Takeshi Kitano. It is based on the semi-autobiographical novel Chi to Hone by Zainichi Korean author Yan Sogiru (Yang Seok-il).

The film opened in Japan on 6 November 2004. It was released on DVD in Japan on 6 April 2005 and South Korea on 16 May 2005. Madman Entertainment distributed it in Australia, while Tartan Video was originally slated to release it in North America. These plans, however, were cancelled due to the company's closure and Kino Entertainment instead took the rights. It was released on DVD in North America on 11 November 2008.

The soundtrack was composed by veteran composer Taro Iwashiro and was later released on iTunes.

The film was nominated for 12 Japanese Academy Awards and won four, including Best Actress, Best Director, Best Supporting Actor, and Best Screenplay. It was Japan's official submission for Best Foreign Language Film at the 78th Academy Awards, but was not accepted as a nominee.

== Plot ==
In 1923, the young Kim Shun-Pei moves from Cheju Island (Korea under Japanese rule), to Osaka (Japan). There, he lives in what is now the Ikuno Korea Town. Through the years, he becomes a cruel, greedy and violent man and builds a factory of kamaboko (processed seafood products) in his poor Korean-Japanese community, where he exploits his employees. He makes a fortune, abuses and destroys the lives of his wife and family, has many mistresses and children and shows no respect to anyone. Later he closes the factory, lending out the money with high interest and becomes a loan shark. His hateful behavior remains unchanged to his last breath, alone in North Korea. The film is told from the perspective of Masao, his legitimate son by his abused and degraded wife, who knows nothing about his father other than to fear him.

== Cast ==
- Takeshi Kitano - Shunpei Kim (김순페이/キム・シュンペイ)
- Hirofumi Arai - Masao Kim (김마사오/キム・マサオ)
- Tomoko Tabata - Hanako Kim (김하나코/キム・ハナコ)
- Joe Odagiri - Takeshi Park (박타케시/パク・タケシ)
- Kyōka Suzuki - Yong-hee Lee (이용희/イ・ヨンヒ)
- Yutaka Matsushige - Nobuyoshi Ko (高信義)
- Mari Hamada - Sadako Toritani (鳥谷定子)
- Yūko Nakamura - Kiyoko Yamanashi (山梨清子)
- Kazuki Kitamura - Yoshio Motoyami (元闇義夫)
- Susumu Terajima - Hee-bom Park (박희봄/パク・ヒボム)
- Atsushi Itō - Yong-il (영일/ヨンイル) / Young Joon-pyong (영준평/ヨン・ジュンピョン)

== See also ==
- Cinema of Japan
- List of submissions to the 78th Academy Awards for Best Foreign Language Film
- List of Japanese submissions for the Academy Award for Best Foreign Language Film
