= 31st Yokohama Film Festival =

2010 film festival in Yokohama, Japan

- Location: Yokohama, Kanagawa, Japan
- Founded: 1980
- Festival date: 2010

The 31st Yokohama Film Festival (第31回ヨコハマ映画祭) was held in 2010 in Yokohama, Kanagawa, Japan.

== Awards ==
- Best Film: - Dear Doctor
- Best Director: Akira Ogata - Nonchan Noriben
- Best New Director:
  - Sumio Ōmori - Kaze ga Tsuyoku Fuiteiru
  - Takuji Suzuki - I'm a Cat Stalker
- Best Screenplay: Miwa Nishikawa - Dear Doctor
- Best Cinematographer: Katsumi Yanagijima - Dear Doctor
- Best Actor: Masato Sakai - The Wonderful World of Captain Kuhio, The Chef of South Polar
- Best Actress: Manami Konishi - Nonchan Noriben
- Best Supporting Actor:
  - Yoshinori Okada - Nonchan Noriben, Jūryoku Piero, Romantic Prelude
  - Yutaka Matsushige - Dear Doctor
- Best Supporting Actress: Sakura Ando - Love Exposure, The Wonderful World of Captain Kuhio, Crime or Punishment?!?
- Best Newcomer:
  - Hikari Mitsushima - Love Exposure, The Wonderful World of Captain Kuhio, Pride
  - Machida Marie - Miyoko Asagaya Kibun
- Examiner Special Award: Kaze ga Tsuyoku Fuiteiru staff and casts
- Special Grand Prize: Kaoru Yachigusa

== Best 10 ==
1. Dear Doctor
2. Villon's Wife
3. Love Exposure
4. Nonchan Noriben
5. Air Doll
6. Kaze ga Tsuyoku Fuiteiru
7. Shizumanu Taiyō
8. Summer Wars
9. Mt. Tsurugidake
10. Ōsaka Hamlet

runner-up: Jūryoku Piero
