= Fortune Favors Lady Nikuko =

Japanese novel by Kanako Nishi

- Novel volume cover

漁港の肉子ちゃん (Gyokō no Nikuko-chan)
- Genre: Drama
- Novel
- Written by: Kanako Nishi
- Published by: Gentosha
- Published: April 2014
- Manga
- Written by: Kanako Nishi
- Illustrated by: Sugisaku
- Published by: Gentosha
- Magazine: Comic Boost
- Original run: January 29, 2021 – March 11, 2022
- Volumes: 2
- Anime film
- Fortune Favors Lady Nikuko

Fortune Favors Lady Nikuko (Japanese: 漁港の肉子ちゃん, Hepburn: Gyokō no Nikuko-chan; "Nikuko of the Fishing Harbor") is a Japanese novel written by Kanako Nishi and published by Gentosha in April 2014. A manga adaptation with art by Sugisaku was serialized online via Gentosha's Comic Boost website from January 29, 2021, to March 11, 2022. It has been collected in two tankōbon volumes. An anime film adaptation by Studio 4°C premiered in Japan on June 11, 2021.

== Characters ==
Nikuko (肉子)
Voiced by: Shinobu Otake
Kikuko (キクコ)
Voiced by: Cocomi
Ninomiya (二宮)
Voiced by: Natsuki Hanae
Lizard (トカゲ)
Voiced by: Hiro Shimono
Gecko (ヤモリ)
Voiced by: Hiro Shimono
Sassan (サッサン)
Voiced by: Ikuji Nakamura
Miu (みう)
Voiced by: Riho Yoshioka
Darcia (ダリシア)
Voiced by: Matsuko Deluxe
Maria (マリア)
Voiced by: Izumi Ishii

Atsushi Yamanishi and Yuichi Yasoda had been cast in unspecified roles.

== Media ==
=== Novel ===
The novel has more than 350,000 copies in print.

=== Manga ===
| No. | Japanese release date | Japanese ISBN |
|---|---|---|
| 1 | May 24, 2021 | 978-4-79-862268-2 |
| 2 | March 24, 2022 | 978-4-34-485016-3 |

=== Film ===
An anime film adaptation by Studio 4°C was announced on January 1, 2021, with Ayumu Watanabe as director, Satomi Ooshima as scriptwriter, Sanma Akashiya as producer, and Kenichi Konishi designing the characters. The film premiered on June 11, 2021. In October 2021, the film was screened In Competition as part of the Scotland Loves Animation film festival, where it won the "Golden Partridge" Jury Award.
