= Rina Endō =

Japanese actress and voice actress (born 2005)

- 遠藤 璃菜
- Born: October 4, 2005 (age 21); Tokyo, Japan
- Occupations: Actress; voice actress; singer
- Employer: AT Production
- Website: Official profile

Rina Endō (遠藤 璃菜, Endō Rina; born October 4, 2005) is a Japanese actress, voice actress and singer.

She began her career as a child actress formerly affiliated with Theatre Academy before transferring and is now currently affiliated with AT Production.

Besides acting in television dramas and movies, she also acts on stage and is active in voice acting. She has also appeared in several commercials. In 2012, she became one of the Ueno Zoo's Panda Ambassadors and served as a captain.

== Biography ==
Born October 4, 2005, Endō entered Theatre Academy when she was just two years old and began working as a child actress at age three.

On October 28, 2012, she was named captain of the Ueno Zoo's Panda Ambassadors and served in the role until 2016.

On April 1, 2021, she launched her Twitter and Instagram accounts. Additionally, she announced the opening of her self-titled YouTube channel a month later on May 27. Later that same year, she marked her debut in the music industry on October 27 with the release of her first digital single "Tomodachi".

In April 2022, she transferred from Theatre Academy to its affiliated group talent agency, AT Production.

As May 12, 2025, she has been the voice of Mai Azabu in Ikizulive! Love Live! Bluebird. That same year on August 31, she made a solo appearance for an in-store live performance at the Ario Kawaguchi 1F Center Court, located in Saitama Prefecture, as the second installment of the "Ikizuraibu! 1st Solo Single Release Event".

== Personal life ==
She has a younger sister. Her special skills include singing and playing the drums.

== Filmography ==
=== Television dramas ===
- Tenchijin (NHK, 2009, Eps. 29-30), Omatsu (childhood)
- Aizen hakama you Sajijo (桂ちづる診察日録) (NHK, 2010, Ep. 10)
- Kaze o Atsumete (風をあつめて) (NHK, 2011), Anna Uragami
- Kenji Yoko Asahina 10 (検事・朝日奈耀子 10) (TV Asahi, 2011)
- Don Quixote (NTV, 2011, Ep. 11), Kaori Murakami
- Chouchou-san ~Saigo ni Bushi no Musume~ (蝶々さん～最後の武士の娘～)(NHK, 2011), Chiyo
- Mousou Sousa ~ Associate Professor Kuwagata Koichi's Stylishna Seikatsu (妄想捜査〜桑潟幸一准教授のスタイリッシュな生活) (TV Asahi, 2012, Ep. 3)
- Jo Mitsuyo Kisaragi Horitsu Jimusho (女三代 如月法律事務所) (TV Tokyo, 2012, Ep. 1)
- Watashi wa Daikō-ya! Haruko no Jiken Suiri 〜 Bājinrōdo o Ubatta Satsujin-han!〜 (私は代行屋！晴子の事件推理 〜バージンロードを奪った殺人犯！〜) (TV Asahi, 2012), Ayano Yoshimura (childhood)
- Piece – Kanojo no Kioku (NTV, 2012, Ep. 2), Mizuho Suga (childhood)
- Drama 10 Single Mothers (ドラマ10 シングルマザーズ) (NHK, 2012), Ayano Kijima (girlhood)
- Shotenin Michiru no Minoue Banashi (NHK, 2013, Ep. 3)
- Dinner (Fuji TV, 2013, Ep. 4), Hazuki (childhood)
- GI DREAM (BS Fuji, 2013), Anri Mori (childhood)
- Kamisama no Boto (神様のボート) (NHK BS Premium, 2013, Ep. 1), Soshi (childhood)
- Paji~ Jiji to Magomusume no Aijou monogatari (ぱじ〜ジイジと孫娘の愛情物語〜) (TV Tokyo, 2013), Ayumi Kobayashi
- Hakui no Namida Part 2 Jimei (Fuji TV, 2013), Saya Shiomi
- Kiyoko Ranman (潔子爛漫～きよこらんまん～) (Fuji TV, 2013, Eps. 32-39), Momo Ninomiya
- Keiji no Manazashi (刑事のまなざし) (TBS, 2013, Ep. 9), Yui Tanaka
- Chotto wa, Darazu ni (ちょっとは、ダラズに。) (NHK BS Premium, 2014), Saya
- Isharyō Bengoshi ~Anata no Namida, Okane ni Kaemashou~ (慰謝料弁護士〜あなたの涙、お金に変えましょう〜) (Yomiuri TV, 2014, Ep. 8), Yuna Sakagami
- Fuyō No Hito ~ Fuji Sanchō No Tsuma (芙蓉の人〜富士山頂の妻) (NHK, 2014), Chiyoko (girl)
- Fukuhara Keibu 5 (福原警部5) (TV Asahi, 2014), Eri Negishi (childhood)
- Tokyo ni Olympics o Yonda Otoko (東京にオリンピックを呼んだ男) (Fuji TV, 2014), Grace Miyako Wada (7 years old)
- Itsutsu Boshi Tourist: Saikou no Tabi, Goannai Shimasu!! (五つ星ツーリスト〜最高の旅、ご案内します!!〜) (Yomiuri TV, 2015, Ep. 2), Honoka Osawa
- Genkai Shuraku Kabushikigaisha (限界集落株式会社) (NHK, 2015, Ep. 3), Daughter of Kageyama
- Tantei no Tantei (探偵の探偵) (Fuji TV, 2015, Ep. 1), Rena (childhood)
- Hotel Concierge (ホテルコンシェルジュ) (TBS, 2015, Ep. 5), Natsuki Kitabayashi
- Jama: Shufu ga Ochita Hametsu no Michi (邪魔〜主婦が堕ちた破滅の道) (TV Tokyo, 2015), Kaori Oikawa
- Library Wars: Book Of Memories (TBS, 2015), Marie (girlhood)
- Kensatsu Jimukan Kuroyuri (検察事務官 黒ユリ) (TBS, 2016), Hitomi (girlhood)

=== Movies ===
- The Lightning Tree (雷桜, Raiou) (2010), Ritsu
- Andalucia: Revenge of the Goddess (2011), Ruka Shindo
- Like Father, Like Son (2013)

=== Stage ===
- Legendary III (2013)
- A Wanderer's Notebook (2015)

=== Television animation ===
- Mushishi Tokubetsu-hen: Hihamukage (2014), Girl
- Mushishi Zoku-Shō (2014), Girl (Ep. 16)
- Barakamon (2014), Hina Kubota
- Tabi Machi Late Show (2016), Yukari (Ep. 3)
- Kiznaiver (2016), Asuka (Ep. 10)
- Sweetness and Lightning (2016), Tsumugi Inuzuka
- Kamiwaza Wanda (2016), Mako
- Xuan Yuan Sword Luminary (2018), Long Juan
- Re-Main (2021), Asumi Kiyomizu
- A Galaxy Next Door (2023), Machi Kuga

=== Theatrical animation ===
- Dareka no Manazashi (2013), Aya Okamura (Aa-chan) (childhood)
- Yu-Gi-Oh!: The Dark Side of Dimensions (2016), Sera (childhood)
- Okko's Inn (2018), Miyo Akino
- Eureka - Eureka Seven: Hi-Evolution (2021), Iris

=== Japanese dub ===
- Christopher Robin (Madeline Robin (Bronte Carmichael))
- Dolittle (Lady Rose (Carmel Laniado))
- Dumbo (Milly Farrier (Nico Parker))
- Wednesday (Wednesday Addams (Jenna Ortega))

=== PV ===
- Oranje. - "Shiawase." (しあわせ。) (2012)

=== Video games ===
- Granblue Fantasy (2016), Drusilla
- God Eater 3 (2018), Phym
- Sakura Kakumei ~Hana Saku Otome-tachi~ (2020), Angelica Tamano
