= Fortune Favors Lady Nikuko (film) =

2021 anime film

- Theatrical release poster
- Kanji: 漁港の肉子ちゃん
- Revised Hepburn: Gyokō no Nikuko-chan
- Directed by: Ayumu Watanabe
- Written by: Satomi Ooshima
- Based on: Fortune Favors Lady Nikuko by Kanako Nishi
- Produced by: Sanma Akashiya
- Starring: Shinobu Otake; Cocomi; Natsuki Hanae; Hiro Shimono
- Music by: Takatsugu Muramatsu
- Production company: Studio 4°C
- Distributed by: Asmik Ace
- Release date: June 11, 2021
- Running time: 97 minutes
- Country: Japan
- Language: Japanese
- Box office: $1,706,970

Fortune Favors Lady Nikuko (Japanese: 漁港の肉子ちゃん, Hepburn: Gyokō no Nikuko-chan; "Nikuko of the Fishing Harbor") is a 2021 Japanese anime film based on the novel of the same name by Kanako Nishi. It was produced by Studio 4°C and directed by Ayumu Watanabe. It was originally released in Japan in June 2021.

== Plot ==
A clumsy but well intended woman lives with her daughter in a boat. They both share an unconventional relationship, as they are both very different from one another.

== Cast ==
Character	Japanese
Nikuko	Shinobu Otake
Kikuko	Cocomi
Ninomiya	Natsuki Hanae
Lizard	Hiro Shimono
Gecko	Hiro Shimono
Sassan	Ikuji Nakamura
Miu	Riho Yoshioka
Darcia	Matsuko Deluxe
Maria	Izumi Ishii

== Production ==
The film was first announced in January 2021. It was produced by Studio 4°C and directed by Ayumu Watanabe, with Satomi Ooshima writing the scripts and Kenichi Konishi designing the characters. The film's main theme is "Image no Uta", performed by Kurumi Inagaki, and the end theme is "Taketen", performed by Greeeen.

== Release ==
The film was theatrically released in Japan on June 11, 2021. Internationally, it was licensed by GKIDS in North America, who screened the film in theaters in the region on June 3, 2022. It was released on DVD and Blu-Ray on July 19, 2022.

== Reception ==
Kim Morrissy from Anime News Network praised the film's animation and "true-to-life" story but criticized the characterization of the titular character.

Fortune Favors Lady Nikuko grossed $1,706,970 at the box office.

=== Accolades ===
Year	Award	Category	Recipient	Result
2021	Fantasia International Film Festival	Axis: The Satoshi Kon Award for Excellence in Animation	Fortune Favors Lady Nikuko	Won
2021	Scotland Loves Animation	Jury Award	Fortune Favors Lady Nikuko	Won
2021	Hochi Film Award	Best Animated Picture	Fortune Favors Lady Nikuko	Won
2022	Japan Academy Film Prize	Animation of the Year	Fortune Favors Lady Nikuko	Nominated
2022	Annie Awards	Best Animated Feature – Independent	Fortune Favors Lady Nikuko	Nominated
2022	25th Japan Media Arts Festival	Excellence Award	Fortune Favors Lady Nikuko	Won
