= Sweetness and Lightning =

Japanese manga series and its adaptation(s)

- First tankōbon volume cover, featuring Kōhei Inuzuka (left) and Tsumugi Inuzuka (right)

甘々と稲妻 (Amaama to Inazuma)
- Genre: Cooking, Iyashikei
- Manga
- Written by: Gido Amagakure
- Published by: Kodansha
- English publisher: NA: Kodansha USA
- Magazine: Good! Afternoon
- Original run: February 7, 2013 – August 7, 2018
- Volumes: 12
- Anime television series
- Directed by: Tarou Iwasaki
- Written by: Mitsutaka Hirota
- Music by: Nobuko Toda
- Studio: TMS/3xCube
- Licensed by: Crunchyroll
- Original network: Tokyo MX, ytv, BS11
- English network: SEA: Aniplus Asia
- Original run: July 4, 2016 – September 19, 2016
- Episodes: 12 (Note: The anime was released across 6 home video release volumes containing 2 episodes each, totalling 12 episodes.)
- icon

Sweetness and Lightning (Japanese: 甘々と稲妻, Hepburn: Amaama to Inazuma) is a Japanese manga series written and illustrated by Gido Amagakure. It was serialized in Kodansha's seinen manga magazine Good! Afternoon from March 2013 to August 2018, with its chapters collected in twelve tankōbon volumes. An anime television series adaptation animated by TMS Entertainment aired in Japan between July and September 2016.

== Plot ==
Kōhei Inuzuka is a teacher who has been raising his daughter, Tsumugi, by himself following the death of his wife. Having mostly bought ready-made meals for his daughter since, Kōhei's encounter with one of his students, Kotori Iida, leads him to take up cooking in order to provide proper meals for Tsumugi.

== Characters ==
Kōhei Inuzuka (犬塚 公平, Inuzuka Kōhei)
Voiced by: Yuichi Nakamura
He is the single father of Tsumugi whose wife died due to an unknown illness half a year before the start of the story. Kind-hearted, hard-working and optimistic, Kohei strives to provide the best possible life for his daughter. He teaches mathematics at Kotori's high school and is her class's assistant homeroom adviser. Initially depicted as having a plain-looking and unassuming appearance, Kohei is also quite thin because he was never an avid eater even when his wife was still alive. Upon witnessing his daughter's enthusiasm towards eating home cooked meals, he began meeting up with Kotori to learn the basics of cooking. The three of them often hang out at Megumi's (the name of Kotori's mother) restaurant in order to prepare and eat meals together. Though relatively inexperienced in cooking, Kohei is a willing learner, and he has steady hands. He is skillful enough with a sewing machine to make a birthday dress for Tsumugi and is very keen in following instructions, albeit being flustered whenever something is not in the recipe. As the series progresses, he not only gains considerable culinary skills, but he also deepens his bond with Tsumugi as well as with their relatives and friends.
Tsumugi Inuzuka (犬塚 つむぎ, Inuzuka Tsumugi)
Voiced by: Rina Endō
Kohei's adorable daughter who attends kindergarten. She is energetic, well behaved and loves her father dearly. She always thinks of him and begins to truly enjoy eating when her father and Kotori start making meals together. She has long, fluffy hair and is a fan of magical girls, especially the fictional series Magi-Girl (マジガル). She likes meat, particularly hamburger steak, however, she doesn't like bell peppers. She has a stuffed animal of Mr. Galigali, the mascot of Magi-Girl, a pink creature with the mixture of a sheep, a pig, and a rabbit.
Kotori Iida (飯田 小鳥, Iida Kotori)
Voiced by: Saori Hayami
Somewhat a loner of a high school girl, who usually doesn't mind being with herself as long as there is good food on hand, Kotori is ecstatic whenever she is in the midst of eating food that suites her taste buds. As an only child of divorced parents, she and her mother Megumi have gotten very close to each other. But when Megumi has to accept work as a TV celebrity chef, Kotori is often left alone at home. Despite being a restaurant owner's daughter, Kotori's learning capacity for cooking is greatly impeded by her terrible fear of knives (the trauma of cutting herself badly as a child still persists). A chance encounter with Kohei (who wasn't aware she's actually one of his students) and Tsumugi led to the three of them meeting up regularly at her mother's restaurant to prepare home cooked meals for them to enjoy afterwards. She enjoys sharing ideas as well as cooking with Kohei and gets along really well with Tsumugi who she treats like a younger sibling. As observed by her best friend Shinobu, Kotori appears to be at her happiest whenever she's cooking food and eating with the Inuzukas.
Shinobu Kojika (小鹿 しのぶ, Kojika Shinobu)
Voiced by: Haruka Tomatsu
Shinobu is Kotori's friend from another class, whose family runs a vegetable shop where Megumi often buys vegetables from. In contrast to Kotori's more shy and reserved nature, Shinobu is boisterous and outgoing. She also calls Tsumugi "Tsumu-Tsumu."
Yūsuke Yagi (八木 祐介, Yagi Yūsuke)
Voiced by: Tomokazu Seki
Kōhei's friend since high school and childhood friend of Tae. He works at a restaurant. Shinobu usually calls him Yagi-chin, a nickname he dislikes due to the fact that he is older than her (see Japanese honorifics § Chan). Despite his gruff and intimidating exterior, he often gives Kōhei advice when he has trouble and sometimes babysits Tsumugi.
Megumi Iida (飯田 恵, Iida Megumi)
Voiced by: Satomi Arai
Kotori's mother who is a celebrity chef. As a result, she is often absent from her restaurant, but usually leaves Kotori recipes to follow when cooking with Kōhei.
Tae Inuzuka (犬塚 多江, Inuzuka Tae)
Voiced by: Ai Kayano
Kōhei's wife and Tsumugi's mother, who died six months prior to the story.
Yuuka (ゆうか)
Voiced by: Shinmugi Koga
Tsumugi's classmate in kindergarten.
Hana (ハナ)
Voiced by: Saya Ando
Tsumugi's classmate in kindergarten.
Mikio (ミキオ)
Voiced by: Shoki Tsuru
Tsumugi's classmate in kindergarten.
Momoya (桃谷先生)
Voiced by: Hirokazu Machida
A male teacher at Kotori and Shinobu's school.

== Media ==
=== Manga ===
Sweetness and Lightning, written and illustrated by Gido Amagakure, was serialized in Kodansha's seinen manga magazine Good! Afternoon from February 7, 2013, to August 7, 2018. Kodansha collected its chapters in twelve volumes, released from September 6, 2013, to February 7, 2019.

In North America, the series was licensed for English release by Kodansha USA. The twelve volumes were published from July 26, 2016, to June 4, 2019.

==== Volumes ====
No.	Original release date	Original ISBN	English release date	English ISBN
1	September 6, 2013	978-4-06-387917-9	July 26, 2016	9781632363695
2	March 7, 2014	978-4-06-387963-6	September 27, 2016	9781632363701
3	September 5, 2014	978-4-06-387994-0	November 29, 2016	9781632363718
4	March 6, 2015	978-4-06-388036-6	February 28, 2017	9781632364005
5	September 7, 2015	978-4-06-388078-6	March 28, 2017	9781632364012
6	March 7, 2016	978-4-06-388126-4	May 30, 2017	9781632364029
7	July 7, 2016	978-4-06-388150-9; ISBN 978-4-06-362331-4 (limited edition)	July 18, 2017	9781632364432
8	January 6, 2017	978-4-06-388229-2	September 5, 2017	9781632365118
9	July 7, 2017	978-4-06-388274-2	November 28, 2017	9781632365125
10	January 5, 2018	978-4-06-511016-4	May 8, 2018	9781632365699
11	July 6, 2018	978-4-06-512069-9	January 15, 2019	9781632365705
12	February 7, 2019	978-4-06-514498-5; ISBN 978-4-06-514743-6 (limited edition)	June 4, 2019	9781632367280

=== Anime ===
An anime television adaptation was announced in February 2016. The series was produced by TMS Entertainment, directed by Tarou Iwasaki and written by Mitsutaka Hirota, featuring character designs by Hiroki Harada and music by Nobuko Toda. The 12-episode series aired in Japan between July 4, 2016, and September 19, 2016, and was previously simulcast by Crunchyroll. The opening theme is "Harebare Fanfare" (晴レ晴レファンファーレ, Bright Fanfare) by Mimi Meme Mimi, while the ending theme is "Maybe" by Brian the Sun.

==== Episode list ====
No.	Title (Note: All English titles are taken from Crunchyroll.)	Original air date
1	"Uniforms and Pot Rice" "Seifuku to Donabe-gohan" (制服とどなべごはん)	July 4, 2016
Kōhei Inuzuka is an assistant teacher who has been raising his daughter, Tsumugi, by himself following the death of his wife, Tae, six months ago, often feeding her pre-made bento lunches. One day, they meet Kōhei's student Kotori, who invites them to her family's restaurant. That same night, Kōhei sees Tsumugi craving a proper meal, like those her mother often made for them, and he rushes her to the restaurant. Despite it being closed, Kotori asks them to stay and makes them pot rice. Kōhei promises to cook Tsumugi proper meals from that moment on. Kotori catches him off-guard when she asks him to cook and have dinner with her.
2	"Pork Soup and Restaurant Lights" "Tonjiru to Mise Akari" (豚汁とみせあかり)	July 11, 2016
Still on the fence over Kotori's proposal, Kōhei arranges to meet with Kotori's mother, Megumi, to discuss it first. She ends up too busy to meet but Kotori convinces Kōhei and Tsumugi to stay and help her cook pork soup for dinner. After enjoying the experience, Kōhei decides to take up Kotori's offer to cook dinner together.
3	"Tsumugi and the Long-Awaited Hamburg Steak" "Tsumugi to Omatase no Hanbāgu" (つむぎとおまたせのハンバーグ)	July 18, 2016
Tsumugi gets into a fight with her kindergarten classmate, Mikio. The experience leaves her upset so Kōhei and Kotori decide to make Hamburg steak to cheer her up. Kotori encourages Kōhei to properly listen to Tsumugi's side of the story. Kōhei assures her he knows she is a good girl, and after she cheers up, she helps them finish making the steaks before letting out the feelings she'd been holding back.
4	"Hated Vegetables and Bits in Gratin" "Kirai na Yasai to Korokoro Guratan" (きらいな野菜とコロコログラタン)	July 25, 2016
Kōhei receives a lot of vegetables from his coworker and Tsumugi's grandmother but struggles to get Tsumugi to eat the dishes he makes with them. Wanting to help her overcome her pickiness, Kotori decides to make a gratin with chopped vegetables inside the bechamel sauce. With some creative involvement, the group makes a dish Tsumugi can enjoy.
5	"A Day Off and Special Doughnuts" "Oyasumi no Hi no Tokubetsu Dōnattsu" (お休みの日のとくべつドーナッツ)	August 1, 2016
Kotori meets Kōhei's friend from high school, Yūsuke Yagi, who occasionally looks after Tsumugi. Learning that Tsumugi seems to refrain from eating doughnuts, Kotori decides doughnuts will be their next cooking venture. While waiting for the dough to rise, Kōhei and Tsumugi spend time together and Kotori bonds with Kōhei. The first batch ends up burnt due to the oil being too hot, but they manage to prepare delicious doughnuts after getting things right with the second batch.
6	"A Gyoza Party with Friends" "Otomodachi to Gyōza Pātī" (おともだちとギョーザパーティー)	August 8, 2016
Kotori's friend Shinobu offers to help with their cooking, and the group decides to make gyoza. Yagi shows up to the party after Tsumugi invites him, proving to be more than capable in the kitchen. Shinobu worries about interfering with Kotori's special time with Kōhei and Tsumugi, but Kotori assures her she is more than welcome.
7	"Gohei Mochi and a Grand Adventure" "Gohei Mochi to Daibōken" (五平餅とだいぼうけん)	August 15, 2016
When Kōhei comes down with a fever, Tsumugi leaves the house on her own and goes on an adventure, facing all sorts of imaginary perils as she makes her way to Kotori's restaurant. Although Tsumugi manages to avoid crying the entire time, she goes into a tantrum when Kōhei scolds her for leaving the house without telling anyone. After the two calm down and apologize to each other, Kotori, having inadvertently burnt some rice, uses what's left to make gohei mochi.
8	"Squid and Taro Stew That's Still Yummy Tomorrow" "Ashita mo Oishii Ika to Satoimo no Nimono" (明日もおいしいイカと里芋の煮物)	August 22, 2016
Kōhei hears about the other parents making new bags for their children and offers to make Tsumugi a new one but she declines, wanting to keep the bag her mother made for her. Still, Kōhei wants to do something for Tsumugi so he asks her if she'd like to eat one of the meals her mother used to make. Tsumugi asks for a squid stew, so Kōhei and Kotori cook it together. Kōhei later sews a cute patch to cover the stain on Tsumugi's bag, and Tsumugi says it is something her parents made together.
9	"Our Family's At-Home Curry" "Uchi no Ouchi Karē" (うちのおうちカレー)	August 29, 2016
After dropping Tsumugi off at a kindergarten sleepover, Kōhei recalls the at-home curry his family used to make. Coming across his wife Tae's old recipe book, Kōhei chooses her dry curry recipe as the next dish they make with Kotori. While enjoying the curry they cooked, Kōhei and Tsumugi are both reminded of their memories with Tae.
10	"Summer Vacation, Kitty, and Aji" "Natsuyasumi to Neko to Aji" (夏休みとねことアジ)	September 5, 2016
Kōhei and Tsumugi go to the beach, but return early due to the hot weather. They bring some aji fish to Kotori's restaurant, where Shinobu suggests Kōhei learn how to fillet them. Kotori decides to make namerō and sangayaki, so they can have the fish raw while also having something cooked for Tsumugi. Tsumugi ends up trying the raw fish and enjoying it. Yagi joins everyone for dinner, and surprises them when he admits he can make sweets. Tsumugi expresses delight over her interesting day.
11	"A Play and Sweet Potato Crêpes" "Oyūgi Kai to Satsumaimo Kurēpu" (おゆうぎ会とさつまいもクレープ)	September 12, 2016
When Kōhei's class competes with another class doing a crêpe stand at the upcoming cultural festival, the students turn to Kotori for menu ideas. Tsumugi feels dejected when her classmate Hana calls her weird for wanting to play a mascot character in a class play. As the gang gets together to make sweet potato crêpes, Tsumugi is comforted in knowing Kōhei is always thinking about her. Kōhei makes Tsumugi a costume for her play, encouraging her to help Hana understand her more. Tsumugi manages to befriend Hana and perform in the play happily while Kotori's sweet potato crêpes become a huge hit at the festival.
12	"Okonomiyaki Filled With Affection" "Aijō Tappuri Okonomiyaki" (あいじょーたっぷりお好み焼き)	September 19, 2016
On the anniversary of Tsumugi's mother Tae's death, Kōhei and Tsumugi try eating at an okonomiyaki restaurant, but Tsumugi gets upset when she doesn't get to do the mixing herself and throws a tantrum. The gang gets together to make an okonomiyaki that Tsumugi can enjoy, but Kotori gets upset when her mother fails to show up once again. Tsumugi gets upset again after Yagi scolds her, though she apologizes after Kōhei talks to her. Kotori's mother, Megumi, shows up just in time, apologizing and introducing herself to everyone, and they have a happy dinner.

== Reception ==
Volume 2 reached the 18th place on the weekly Oricon manga chart and, as of March 16, 2014, has sold 60,643 copies; volume 3 reached the 19th place and, as of September 14, 2014, has sold 81,319 copies; and volume 4 reached the 20th place and, as of March 9, 2015, has sold 108,994 copies.

It ranked eighth on the 2014 Kono Manga ga Sugoi! Top 20 Manga for Male Readers survey and number 24 on the 15th Book of the Year list by Da Vinci magazine. The series ranked 14th in the first Next Manga Award in the print manga category.

== See also ==
- A Galaxy Next Door, another manga series by the same author
- Yurayura Q, another manga series by the same author
