= Riko Narumi =

Japanese actress and model (born 1992)

- 成海 璃子
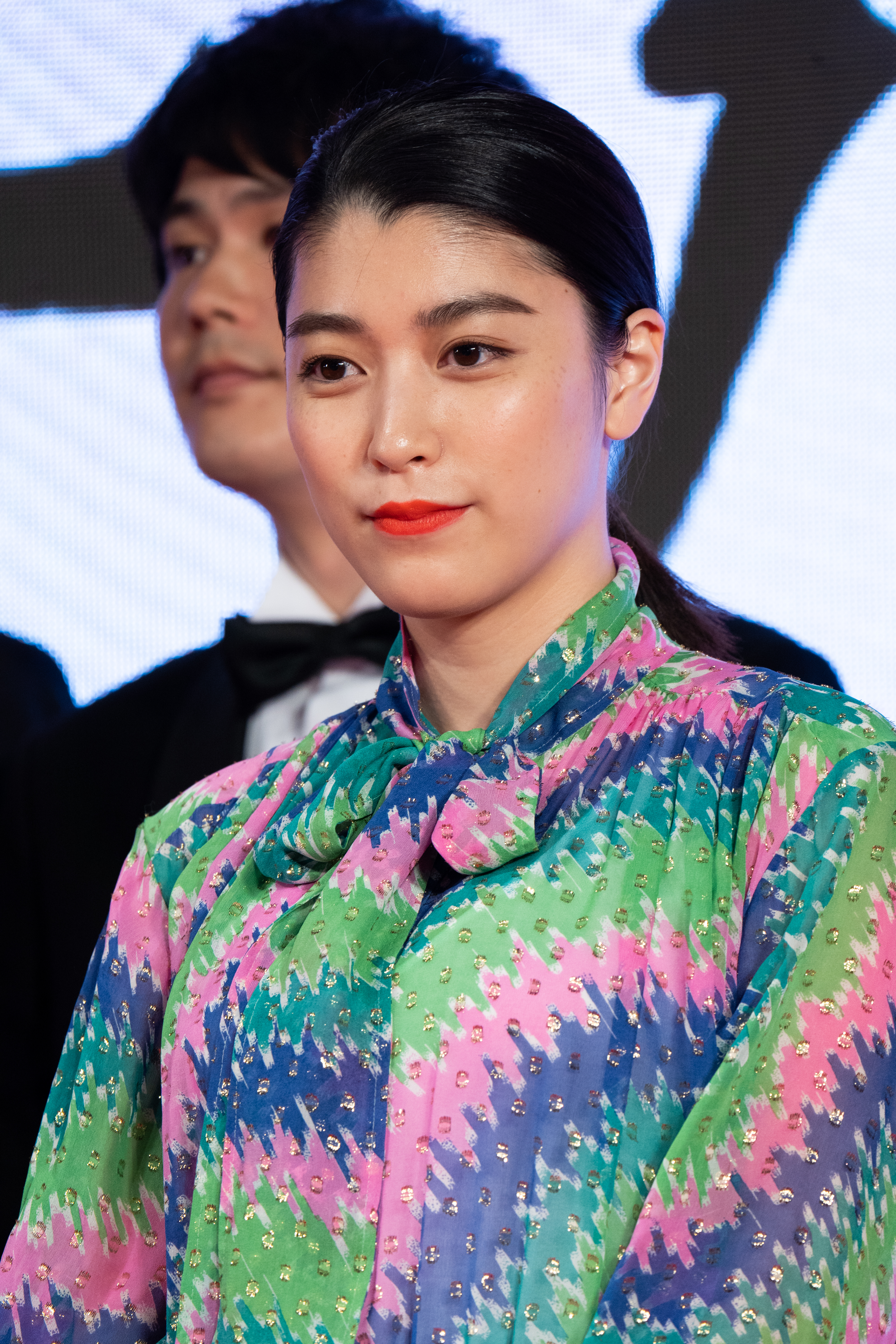
- Narumi at the Tokyo International Film Festival in 2019
- Born: Riko Tsukamoto; 18 August 1992 (age 34); Kanagawa-ku, Yokohama, Kanagawa Prefecture, Japan
- Occupations: Actress; model
- Years active: 1997–present
- Agent: Ken-On
- Notable work: Ruri's Island; Tsumitoka batsutoka; Bushido Sixteen
- Height: 1.63 m (5 ft 4 in)
- Spouse: Undisclosed (m. 2020)
- Website: www.ken-on.co.jp/artists/narumi/

Riko Tsukamoto (塚本 璃子, Tsukamoto Riko; August 18, 1992), known professionally by the stage name Riko Narumi (成海 璃子) is a Japanese actress and model.

== Personal life ==
On September 23, 2020, Narumi's agency announced that she had registered her marriage to a non-celebrity man. Her spouse's name was not disclosed.

== Filmography ==
=== Films ===
Year	Release Date	Title	Role
2002	November 9	Trick: The Movie (トリック劇場版, Torikku Gekijōban)	Kotomi (琴美)
2005	June 25	Umezu Kazuo Kyōfu Gekijō: Madara no Shōjo (楳図かずお恐怖劇場 まだらの少女)	Kyōko Yamakawa (山川 京子)
2005	August 6	The Great Yokai War (妖怪大戦争, Yōkai Daisensō)	Tataru Inō (稲生 タタル)
2006	March 11	Gigolo Wannabe (ウォーターズ, Wōtāzu)	Chika (チカ)
2006	March 25	Ame no machi (雨の町)	Ayako (絢子)
2007	April 21	Shindō (神童)	Uta Naruse (成瀬 うた)
2007	April 28	Ashita no watashi no tsukurikata (あしたの私のつくり方)	Juri Ōshima (大島 寿梨)
2007	June 16	Calling You (きみにしか、聞こえない, Kimi ni shika kikoenai)	Ryō Aihara (相原 リョウ)
2008	March 1	The Golden Compass	Voice of Pantalaimon for the Japanese dubbed version
2008	September 27	Ikigami (イキガミ)	Sakura Iizuka (飯塚 さくら)
2009	post-production	Tsumitoka batsutoka (罪とか罰とか)	
2009	post-production	Yamagata Scream (山形スクリーム, Yamagata Sukurīmu)	Mikayo Okagaito (岡垣内 美香代)
2009	April 24	Bushido Sixteen (武士道シックスティーン, Bushidō Shikkusutīn)	Kaori Isoyama (磯山 香織)
2009	May 15	Shodo Girls (書道ガールズ!! わたしたちの甲子園, Shodō gāruzu! ! Watashi-tachi no kōshien)	Satoko Hayakawa (早川 里子)
2009	June 5	Seaside Motel	Rui Ninomiya
2011	May 14	Shōjotachi no Rashinban	Rumi Kusuda
2012	June 23	Love Masao-kun ga Iku!	Mizuki Yoshino
2012	September 29	Bungō: Sasayaka na Yokubō	Yūko Mizuki
2013	September 28	Why Don't You Play in Hell?	Yoshiko
2013	December 7	Ask This of Rikyu	Osan
2013	December 14	Bushi no Kondate	Sayo Imai
2014	February 8	Nishino Yukihiko no Koi to Bōken	Subaru
2015	June 20	Yakuza Apocalypse	Kyōko
2015	June 27	Strayer's Chronicle	Saya
2016		A Cappella	Kyoko Noma
2016		The Old Capital	Yui
2017		Miracles of the Namiya General Store	Akiko
2018		Kazoku no Hanashi	
2019		Aiuta: Yakusoku no Nakuhito	
2019		Ghost Master	Mana
2019		Black School Rules	
2020		Labyrinth of Cinema	Kazumi Saitō
2020		Georama Boy, Panorama Girl	

=== Television ===
Year	Release Date	Title	Role
2000	Jun. - Sep.	Trick (TRICK)	Young Naoko Yamada (山田 奈緒子)
2002	Jan. - Mar.	Trick 2 (TRICK 2)	Young Naoko Yamada (山田 奈緒子)
2002	Apr. - Jun.	Wedding Planner (ウエディングプランナー, Uedingu purannā): Ep.6,7	Haruka Mishima (三島 はるか)
2003	Jul. - Sep.	Kunimitsu no Matsuri (クニミツの政)	Akane Morimura (森村 茜)
2004	Apr. - Jun.	Denchi ga Kireru made (電池が切れるまで)	Yūka Tachibana (橘 結花)
2005	Apr. - Jun.	Ruri no shima (瑠璃の島)	Ruri Fujisawa (藤沢 瑠璃)
2005	Oct. - Dec.	1 Litre of Tears (1リットルの涙, Ichi Rittoru no Namida)	Ako Ikeuchi (池内 亜湖)
2006	Jan. - Mar.	Kami wa Saikoro o Furanai (神はサイコロを振らない)	Ruriko Gotō (後藤 瑠璃子)
2007	January 6	Ruri no Shima Special 2007 (瑠璃の島 SPECIAL 2007)	Ruri Fujisawa (藤沢 瑠璃)
2007	Jan. - Mar.	Queen of Enka (演歌の女王, Enka no Joō)	Sadako Gomi (五味 貞子)
2007	April 5	1 Litre of Tears Special (1リットルの涙 特別編 〜追憶〜, Ichi Rittoru no Namida Tokubetsuhen Tsuioku)	Ako Ikeuchi (池内 亜湖)
2007	Jul. - Sep.	Juken no kamisama (受験の神様)	Michiko Sugawara (菅原 道子)
2008	Jan. - Mar.	Honey and Clover (ハチミツとクローバー, Hachimitsu to Kurōbā)	Hagumi Hanamoto (花本 はぐみ)
2009	March 7–14	Chance! (チャンス!: episode 2, epilogue)	Okawa Izumi
2010	Jan. 9 - Mar. 27	Sakuya Konohana (咲くやこの花)	Koi (こい)
2011	Jul. - Sep.	Don Quixote (ドン★キホーテ)	Sachiko Matsuura
2012	Jan - Dec	Taira no Kiyomori (平清盛)	Taira no Shigeku/Kenshunmon'in
2015	June 24	Eien no Bokura: Sea Side Blue (永遠のぼくら Sea Side Blue)	Yumeka Saeki (佐伯夢花)
2018	Oct. - Dec.	Showa Genroku Rakugo Shinju (昭和元禄落語心中)	Konatsu (小夏)
2021		Reach Beyond the Blue Sky	Shibusawa Yoshi
2022		A Day-Off of Ryunosuke Kamiki	Mami Nikaidō
2023		Ranman	Ei Kuraki

== Photobooks ==
- 12sai (Littele More, 28 June 2005) ISBN 4898151531
- 14sai no Koibana (Shufunotomo, 23 March 2007) ISBN 9784072558522
- Natural Pure (Kadokawa Media House, 12 June 2007) ISBN 9784048949088
- Rico Days (Wani Books, 5 September 2012) ISBN 9784847044847

== Video games ==
- Prince of Persia (Elika in Japanese dub)
