= Kiiroi Zou =

- Theatrical release poster
- Directed by: Ryūichi Hiroki
- Screenplay by: Sho Kataoka; Hisako Kurosawa
- Based on: Kiiroi Zou by Kanako Nishi
- Produced by: Yusuke Wakabayashi; Rikyu Ohata; Toshihisa Ohata; Toshiyuki Yasuda
- Starring: Aoi Miyazaki; Osamu Mukai; Tatsuomi Hamada
- Cinematography: Atsuhiro Nabeshima
- Edited by: Hani Mituhashi
- Music by: Otomo Yoshihide
- Production company: Showgate
- Release date: February 2, 2013 (Japan)
- Running time: 131 minutes
- Country: Japan
- Language: Japanese

Kiiroi Zou (Japanese: きいろいゾウ), also known as Yellow Elephant, is a 2013 Japanese romantic drama film directed by Ryūichi Hiroki.

== Cast ==
- Aoi Miyazaki as Aiko Tsumari
- Osamu Mukai as Ayumu Muko
- Tatsuomi Hamada
- Himeka Asami
- Miyu Honda
- Akira Emoto
- Chieko Matsubara
- Lily Franky
- Tamaki Ogawa
- Ren Osugi as Sotetsu (voice)
- Tasuku Emoto as Kosoku (voice)
- Sakura Ando as Kanyu (voice)
- Kengo Kora (voice)
