= Sakura Ando =

Japanese actress (born 1986)

- 安藤 サクラ
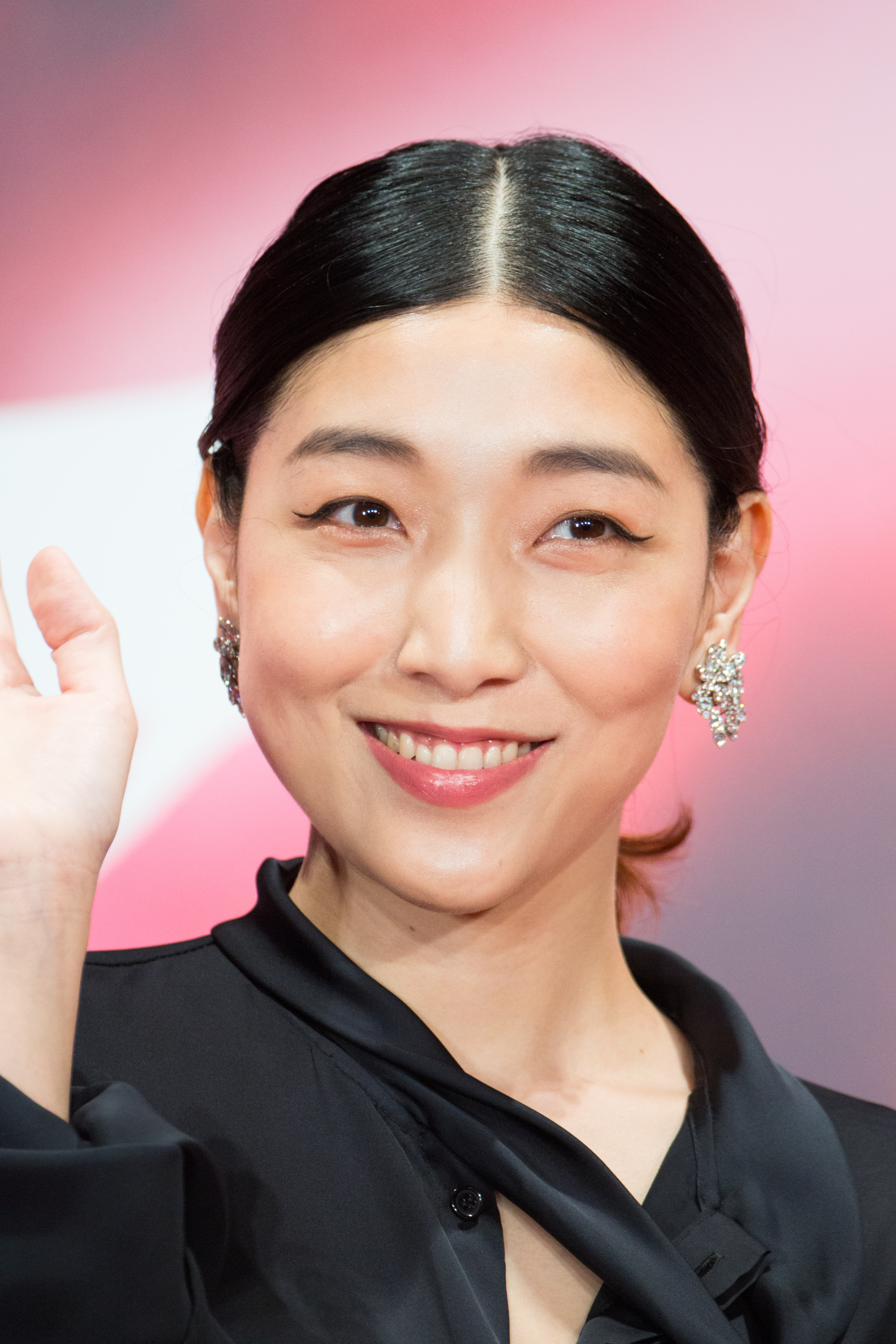
- Ando at the Tokyo International Film Festival in October 2017
- Born: February 18, 1986 (age 40); Tokyo, Japan
- Occupation: Actress
- Years active: 2005–present
- Spouse: Tasuku Emoto (m. 2012)
- Children: 1
- Parent(s): Eiji Okuda (father); Kazu Ando (mother)
- Relatives: Momoko Ando (sister); Takeru Inukai (grandfather); Akira Emoto (father-in-law); Tokio Emoto (brother-in-law)

Sakura Ando (安藤 サクラ, Andō Sakura; born February 18, 1986) is a Japanese actress. She is best known for appearing in critically-acclaimed films such as Sion Sono's Love Exposure, Hirokazu Koreeda's Shoplifters (2018) and Monster (2023), as well as Takashi Yamazaki's Academy Award–winning kaiju epic Godzilla Minus One (2023) and its sequel Godzilla Minus Zero (2026).

== Career ==
Ando won the award for Best Supporting Actress at the 31st Yokohama Film Festival 2010 for Love Exposure, The Wonderful World of Captain Kuhio and Tsumitoka batsutoka. She was also nominated for the award for best supporting actress at 4th Asian Film Awards 2010 for A Crowd of Three.

She appeared in Kiyoshi Kurosawa's 2012 television drama Penance.

She has also appeared in films such as The Samurai That Night, Our Homeland, and Petal Dance.

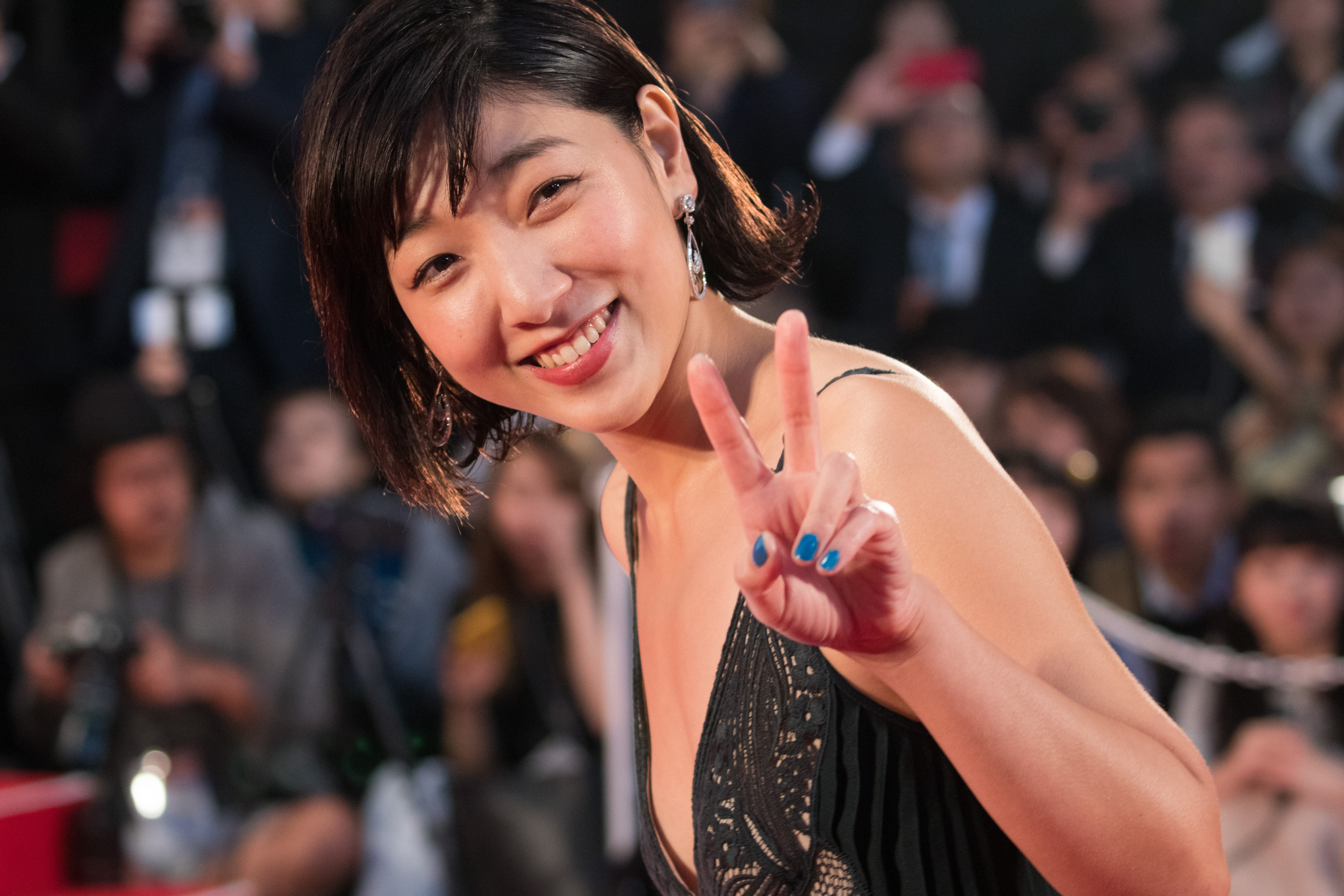
Ando at the 2016 Tokyo International Film Festival

In 2015, Ando received the Cut Above Award for Outstanding Performance in Film at Japan Cuts: Festival of New Japanese Film in New York.

In 2018, Ando received high praise for her performance as Nobuyo Shibata in director Hirokazu Koreeda's Shoplifters, being called "fantastic" and "the stand-out", with film critic Simon Abrams stating that "Kore-eda gave Andô her character's (strictly metaphorical) dance steps, but she realizes and owns every maneuver she was asked to (and then some).... No small feat... given how subtly complicated her dance steps are." In June 2023, Ando was invited to become a member of the Academy of Motion Picture Arts and Sciences.

== Filmography ==
=== Film ===
Year	Title	Role	Notes	Ref(s)
2006	A Long Walk	Waitress		
2007	Out of the Wind	Mariko Iwata	Leading role	
2008	Love Exposure	Koike		
2008	Ain’t No Tomorrows	Chizu		
2009	The Wonderful World of Captain Kuhio	Rika		
2009	Crime or Punishment?!?	Momo Mimikawa		
2010	Sweet Little Lies	Miyako		
2010	A Crowd of Three	Kayo	Leading role	
2012	Our Homeland	Rie	Leading role	
2012	For Love's Sake	Gamuko		
2012	The Samurai That Night	Mika		
2013	Petal Dance	Motoko		
2013	Yellow Elephant	Kan'yu (voice)		
2014	Homeland	Misa		
2014	Her Granddaughter	Misaki Akimoto		
2014	0.5 mm	Sawa Yamagishi	Leading role	
2014	100 Yen Love	Ichiko Saito	Leading role	
2015	Asleep	Terako	Leading role	
2016	Dias Police: Dirty Yellow Boys	Yumeko		
2017	Reminiscences	Ryōko Nishina		
2017	Tornado Girl	Yū Mikami		
2017	Sound of Waves	Yūko	Leading role	
2017	Destiny: The Tale of Kamakura	The Grim Reaper		
2018	Shoplifters	Nobuyo Shibata	Leading role	
2021	The Great Yokai War: Guardians	Kokakuchō		
2022	A Man	Rie Taniguchi		
2023	Monster	Saori	Leading role	
2023	Bad Lands	Neri	Leading role	
2023	We're Millennials. Got a Problem?: The Movie	Akane Miyashita		
2023	The Imaginary	Lizzie (voice)		
2023	Godzilla Minus One	Sumiko Ota		
2025	A Very Straight Neck		Short Film	
2026	Dora	Nami	South Korean film	
2026	Godzilla Minus Zero	Sumiko Ota		

=== Television ===
Year	Title	Role	Notes	Ref(s)
2011	Still, Life Goes On			
2011	Sunshine	Mitsu Miyamoto	Asadora	
2012	Penance		Miniseries	
2015	Mamagoto	Hideko Onji	Leading role	
2015	We're Millennials. Got a Problem?	Akane Miyashita		
2018	Magical × Heroine Magimajo Pures!	Mokonyan (voice)		
2018–19	Manpuku	Fukuko Tachibana	Leading role; Asadora	
2019	Mango no Ki no Shita de	Misaki Tamiya	TV movie	
2019	Idaten	Masae Kasai	Taiga drama	
2019	Natsuzora: Natsu's Sky	An anime's narrator	Asadora	
2021	Ryūkō Kanbō	Haruko	TV movie	
2022	Rebooting	Asami Kondō	Leading role	
2025	The Hot Spot	Takahashi's mother	Episode 8; special appearance	
2026	Brothers in Arms	Narrator	Taiga drama	

== Awards and nominations ==
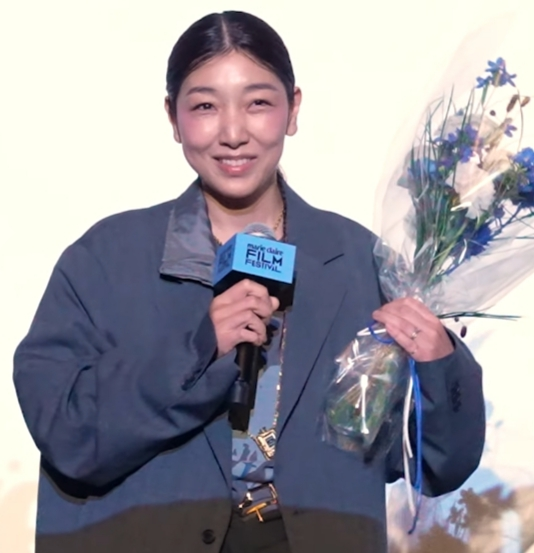
Ando at the 13th Marie Claire Film Festival in April 2026

Year	Award ceremony	Category	Work(s)	Result	Ref(s)
2010	31st Yokohama Film Festival	Best Supporting Actress	Love Exposure	Won	
2010	4th Asian Film Awards	Best Supporting Actress	A Crowd of Three	Nominated	
2011	84th Kinema Junpo Award	Best Supporting Actress	A Crowd of Three	Won	
2012	37th Hochi Film Award	Best Supporting Actress	For Love's Sake, The Samurai That Night	Won	
2012	34th Yokohama Film Festival	Best Supporting Actress	For Love's Sake, The Samurai That Night	Won	
2013	86th Kinema Junpo Award	Best Supporting Actress	For Love's Sake, The Samurai That Night, etc.	Won	
2013	86th Kinema Junpo Award	Best Actress	Our Homeland	Won	
2013	55th Blue Ribbon Awards	Best Actress	Our Homeland	Won	
2013	22nd Japanese Film Critics Awards	Best Actress	Our Homeland	Won	
2013	67th Mainichi Film Awards	Best Supporting Actress	For Love's Sake	Won	
2015	38th Japan Academy Prize	Best Actress	0.5 mm	Nominated	
2015	57th Blue Ribbon Awards	Best Actress	0.5 mm, 100 Yen Love	Won	
2015	24th Japanese Film Critics Awards	Best Actress	0.5 mm, 100 Yen Love	Won	
2015	88th Kinema Junpo Award	Best Actress	100 Yen Love	Won	
2015	69th Mainichi Film Awards	Best Actress	0.5 mm	Won	
2016	39th Japan Academy Prize	Best Actress	100 Yen Love	Won	
2018	27th Tokyo Sports Film Award	Best Supporting Actress	Reminiscence	Nominated	
2018	43rd Hochi Film Awards	Best Actress	Shoplifters	Nominated	
2018	31st Nikkan Sports Film Awards	Best Actress	Shoplifters	Won	
2018	31st Nikkan Sports Film Awards	Best Supporting Actress	Destiny: The Tale of Kamakura	Nominated	
2018	23rd Florida Film Critics Circle Award	Best Supporting Actress	Shoplifters	Won	
2019	40th Yokohama Film Festival	Best Actress	Shoplifters	Won	
2019	73rd Mainichi Film Awards	Best Actress	Shoplifters	Won	
2019	73rd Mainichi Film Awards	Kinuyo Tanaka Award	Herself	Nominated	
2019	61st Blue Ribbon Awards	Best Actress	Shoplifters	Nominated	
2019	28th Tokyo Sports Film Award	Best Actress	Shoplifters	Won	
2019	92nd Kinema Junpo Awards	Best Actress	Shoplifters	Won	
2019	42nd Japan Academy Prize	Best Actress	Shoplifters	Won	
2019	13th Asian Film Awards	Best Actress	Shoplifters	Nominated	
2020	44th Elan d'or Awards	Newcomer of the Year	Herself	Won	
2022	47th Hochi Film Awards	Best Supporting Actress	A Man	Nominated	
2023	77th Mainichi Film Awards	Best Supporting Actress	A Man	Nominated	
2023	65th Blue Ribbon Awards	Best Supporting Actress	A Man and Korosuna	Nominated	
2023	46th Japan Academy Film Prize	Best Supporting Actress	A Man	Won	
2023	16th Asian Film Awards	Best Supporting Actress	A Man	Nominated	
2023	26th Nikkan Sports Drama Grand Prix	Best Actress	Rebooting	Won	
2023	36th Nikkan Sports Film Awards	Best Actress	Monster and Bad Lands	Nominated	
2024	78th Mainichi Film Awards	Best Actress	Bad Lands	Nominated	
2024	66th Blue Ribbon Awards	Best Actress	Bad Lands	Nominated	
2024	47th Japan Academy Film Prize	Best Actress	Monster	Won	
2024	47th Japan Academy Film Prize	Best Supporting Actress	Godzilla Minus One	Won	

== Family tree ==
Tsuyoshi Inukai
Yutaka Ando	Takeru Inukai	Masako Ogino
Eiji Okuda	Kazu Ando	Akira Emoto	Kazue Tsunogae
Momoko Ando	Sakura Ando	Tasuku Emoto	Tokio Emoto
unknown daughter
