= A Galaxy Next Door =

Japanese manga series

- First tankōbon volume cover, featuring Shiori Goshiki

おとなりに銀河 (Otonari ni Ginga)
- Genre: Romantic comedy; Science fiction
- Manga
- Written by: Gido Amagakure
- Published by: Kodansha
- English publisher: NA: Kodansha USA
- Magazine: Good! Afternoon
- Original run: April 7, 2020 – June 7, 2023
- Volumes: 6
- Television drama
- Directed by: Yoshihito Okashita; Izuru Kumasaka; Masayuki Kokuryō
- Original network: NHK
- Original run: April 3, 2023 – May 25, 2023
- Episodes: 32
- Anime television series
- Directed by: Ryuichi Kimura
- Written by: Gigaemon Ichikawa
- Music by: Takatsugu Wakabayashi
- Studio: Asahi Production
- Licensed by: Crunchyroll: SA/SEA: Medialink
- Original network: Tokyo MX, BS11
- Original run: April 9, 2023 – June 25, 2023
- Episodes: 12
- icon

A Galaxy Next Door (Japanese: おとなりに銀河, Hepburn: Otonari ni Ginga) is a Japanese manga series written and illustrated by Gido Amagakure. It was serialized in Kodansha's seinen manga magazine Good! Afternoon from April 2020 to June 2023, with its chapters collected in six tankōbon volumes. A television drama adaptation aired from April to May 2023. An anime television series adaptation by Asahi Production aired from April to June 2023.

== Plot ==
Ichiro Kuga, a struggling shōjo manga artist, unexpectedly becomes the guardian of his younger siblings after their father's death. To support them, he rents out rooms in his apartment complex and works tirelessly on his manga. Facing low sales and looming deadlines, his situation seems dire until Shiori Goshiki, a talented novice artist, becomes his assistant. Together, they navigate the challenges of the industry. However, their lives take a strange turn when a supernatural incident leads Shiori to declare them engaged. Now, Ichiro must balance his new relationship with Shiori while managing his responsibilities and pursuing his passion for manga.

== Characters ==
Ichiro Kuga (久我 一郎, Kuga Ichirō)
Voiced by: Taku Yashiro (Japanese); Nazeeh Tarsha (English)
Portrayed by: Hayato Sano
23-year-old manga artist. He debuted after graduating from high school, but since his father passed away, he is determined to send his sister and brother to college. His pen name is Kokone Momoty. At first, he drew shōnen manga, but he switched to shōjo manga and is serialized in the Monthly Anko magazine. After accidentally pricking himself with Shiori's thorns, he is under her control against her will and is harmed whenever they are physically separated.
Shiori Goshiki (五色 しおり, Goshiki Shiori)
Voiced by: Yū Wakui (Japanese); Katelyn Barr (English)
19-year-old princess of the shooting star people. She is Ichiro's assistant. By tradition she marries the person who is pricked by her thorn. Though she was supposed to be in a marriage arranged by her parents, she left the island to marry for love. After becoming Ichiro's assistant, he mistakes her thorn as a pen and when Ichiro tries to remove it, he is pricked. She moves in with Ichiro because he is physically harmed whenever they are apart. They eventually fall in love.
Machi Kuga (久我 まち, Kuga Machi)
Voiced by: Rina Endō (Japanese); Kelsey Maher (English)
Ichiro's younger sister. She wants to be a fortune teller.
Fumio Kuga (久我 ふみお, Kuga Fumio)
Voiced by: Maria Naganawa (Japanese); Emily Fajardo (English)
Ichiro and Machi's younger brother. He is shy but is honest with people he is close to.
Chihiro Ibusuki (指宿 ちひろ, Ibusuki Chihiro)
Voiced by: Rie Takahashi (Japanese); Meg McClain (English)
Ichiro's cousin who is 16 years old. She lives in the same apartment as him.
Masahiro Morikuni (護国 正弘, Morikuni Masahiro)
Voiced by: Tomokazu Sugita (Japanese); Jack Reeder (English)
Manga editor. He is in charge of Ichiro's manga.
Momoka Morikuni (護国 桃香, Morikuni Momoka)
Voiced by: Yoko Hikasa
Masahiro's wife who used to live in the same apartment as Ichiro. She is the author of the manga Shishi no Kenshi under the pen name Katamari Niku. Shiori admires her.
Yuta Sano (佐野 優大, Sano Yūta)
Voiced by: Jun Fukuyama
Magic girl manga artist whom Shiori helped as an assistant. Acquainted with Ichiro's family.
Miyako Goshiki (五色 都, Goshiki Miyako)
Voiced by: Hiroko Kiso (Japanese); Natalie Van Sistine (English)
Shiori's mother. She has a strict personality and does not get along with her daughter because she raised Shiori strictly to be the successor of the family.
Ken Goshiki (五色 健, Goshiki Ken)
Voiced by: Shinji Nagano
Shiori's father. In contrast to his wife, he has a mild personality.
Fumi Goshiki (五色 文, Goshiki Fumi)
Voiced by: Satomi Kobayashi
Koyo Makado (馬門 紅葉, Makado Kōyō)
Voiced by: Eriko Matsui
Follower of the Goshiki family. He is calm and composed but understands Shiori.
Keigo Komaki (古牧 京吾, Komaki Keigo)
Voiced by: Miharu Hanai
Follower of the Goshiki family. He wants to be Shiori's bride and is therefore unhappy with Ichiro.

== Media ==
=== Manga ===
Written and illustrated by Gido Amagakure, A Galaxy Next Door started in Kodansha's seinen manga magazine Good! Afternoon on April 7, 2020. The series finished on May 6, 2023; an epilogue chapter was published on June 7 of the same year. Kodansha collected its chapters in six tankōbon volumes, released from November 6, 2020, to July 6, 2023.

In June 2021, Kodansha USA announced the English release of the manga in North America. The six volumes were released from April 26, 2022, to May 14, 2024.

==== Volumes ====
No.	Original release date	Original ISBN	English release date	English ISBN
1	November 6, 2020	978-4-06-521437-4	April 26, 2022	978-1-64-651463-2
1. "Crunch Time with the Princess" (姫と修羅場, Hime to Shuraba); 2. "A Feverish Handshake with the Princess" (熱と握手, Netsu to Akushu); 3. "Shopping with the Princess" (姫とお買い物, Hime to O Kaimono); 4. "Drama Bomb with the Princess" (姫と爆発, Hime to Bakuhatsu); 5. "Local Conditions with the Princess" (姫と空もよう, Hime to Sora mo Yō)
2	May 7, 2021	978-4-06-523224-8	July 19, 2022	978-1-64-651464-9
6. "Going to the Zoo with the Princess" (姫と動物園, Hime to Dōbutsuen); 7. "A Letter for the Princess" (姫とお手紙, Hime to O Tegami); 8. "Sick Day with the Princess" (姫と微熱, Hime to Binetsu); 9. "Christmas with the Princess" (姫とクリスマス, Hime to Kurisumasu); 10. "Hot Springs with the Princess" (姫と温泉, Hime to Onsen); Interlude: "Introductions with the Princess" (姫とご挨拶, Hime to Go Aisatsu)
3	November 5, 2021	978-4-06-525933-7	November 1, 2022	978-1-64-651563-9
11. "Souvenir Shopping with the Princess" (姫とお土産, Hime to Odosan); 12. "A Family Meeting with the Princess" (姫と家族会議, Hime to Kazoku Kaigi); 13. "Removing the Stinger with Kuga-kun" (久我くんと刺抜き, Kuga-kun to Toge Nuki); 14. "It's a Date with the Princess" (姫と待ち合わせ, Hime to Machiawase); 15. "Fireworks with the Princess" (姫と花火, Hime to Hanabi)
4	May 6, 2022	978-4-06-527827-7	January 10, 2023	978-1-64-651564-6
16. "The Space Between Two Bodies" (ふたりの距離, Futari no Kyori); 17. "Home Date with the Princess" (姫とおうちデート, Hime to O Uchi Dēto); 18. "Flowers by Night with the Princess" (姫と夜桜, Hime to Yozakura); 19. "Machi's Hectic Week" (まちと大変な日々, Machi to Taihenna Hibi); 20. "A Present for the Princess" (姫とプレゼント, Hime to Purezento); Interlude: "It's a Date with the Princess: The Day Before" (姫とデート前日, Hime to Dēto Zenjitsu)
5	November 7, 2022	978-4-06-529651-6	July 11, 2023	978-1-64-651682-7
Interlude 1: "Little Things with the Princess" (姫とちっちゃいこと, Hime to Chicchai Koto); 21. "A Visit Home with the Princess" (姫と故郷, Hime to Kokyō); 22. "The Special Encouragement Award and the Princess" (姫と期待賞, Hime to Kitai-shō); 23. "Lovesick with Kuga-kun" (久我くんと恋のやまい, Kuga-kun to Koi Noyamai); 24. "A Special Day with the Princess" (姫と記念日, Hime to Kinenbi); Interlude 2: "Drinking with the Princess and Chibi-chan" (ちびちゃんと姫とお酒, Chibi-chan to Hime to O Sake)
6	July 6, 2023	978-4-06-532163-8	May 14, 2024	978-1-64-651884-5
25. "A Wedding for Two" (ふたりの結婚式, Futari no Kekkonshiki); 26. "Shiori and Her Name" (しおりと名前, Shiori to Namae); 27. "Goodbye to Chibi-chan" (ちびちゃんと行ってきます, Chibi-chan to Ittekimasu); 28. "A Summer Project with Fumio" (ふみおと自由研究, Fumio to Jiyukenkyū); 29. "Life Changes with Shiori and Ichiro" (ふたりと変わりゆく日々, Futari to Kawari Yuku Hibi); 30. "Momoka and Makado" (桃香と馬門, Momoka to Makado); 31. "The Happy Couple and Their New Family" (ふたりと新しい家族, Futari to Atarashii Kazoku); Final Chapter: "To You Next Door" (おとなりの君に, O Tonari no Kimi ni); Interlude: "Their Number One" (二人の一番, Futari no Ichiban)

=== Drama ===
In January 2023, television drama adaptation was announced, with Yoshihito Okashita, Izuru Kumasaka, Masayuki Kokuryō serving as directors. It was broadcast for 32 episodes on NHK from April 3 to May 25, 2023.

==== Episodes ====
No.	Title	Directed by	Written by	Original release date
1	"What's the relationship between two people who are new to love?" Transliteration: "Ren'ai Shoshinsha no Futari ga Musunda Kankeitte?" (Japanese: 恋愛初心者のふたりが結んだ関係って?)	Uiko Miura	Yoshihito Okashita	April 3, 2023
2	"She was the princess of the shooting star people" Transliteration: "Nagareboshi no Min no Himedatta, Kanojo." (Japanese: 流れ星の民の姫だった、彼女。)	Uiko Miura	Yoshihito Okashita	April 4, 2023
3	"A troubled rule between the two" Transliteration: "Futari no Ma no, Komatta Hōsoku." (Japanese: ふたりの間の、困った法則。)	Uiko Miura	Yoshihito Okashita	April 5, 2023
4	"I want to cooperate. I want to know you" Transliteration: "Kyōryoku Shitai. Anata o Shiritai." (Japanese: 協力したい。あなたを知りたい。)	Uiko Miura	Yoshihito Okashita	April 6, 2023
5	"She is Ichiro's childhood friend. And..."; Transliteration: "Kanojo wa Ichirō no Osananajimi. Soshite..." (Japanese: 彼女は一郎の幼なじみ。そして...)	Uiko Miura	Yoshihito Okashita	April 10, 2023
6	"Two experiments. Then, finally" Transliteration: "Futari no Jikken. Soshite, Tsui ni." (Japanese: ふたりの実験。そして、ついに。)	Uiko Miura	Yoshihito Okashita	April 11, 2023
7	"Telling my thoughts, after that" Transliteration: "Omoi o Tsugets Sono Ato ni." (Japanese: 思いを告げた、そのあとに。)	Uiko Miura	Yoshihito Okashita	April 12, 2023
8	"Our house is the zoo tonight" Transliteration: "Kon'ya wa, Wagaya da Dōbutsuen." (Japanese: 今夜は、わが家が動物園。)	Uiko Miura	Yoshihito Okashita	April 13, 2023
9	"We are dating" Transliteration: "Watashi-tachi, Otsukiai Shitemasu." (Japanese: 私たち、お付き合いしてます。)	Uiko Miura, Arisa Tomiyama	Izuru Kumasaka	April 17, 2023
10	"What I can do for her" Transliteration: "Boku ga Kanojo ni Dekiru koto." (Japanese: ぼくが彼女にできること。)	Uiko Miura, Arisa Tomiyama	Izuru Kumasaka	April 18, 2023
11	"Today with grave visit together" Transliteration: "Kyō wa Issho ni o Hakamairi." (Japanese: 今日は一緒にお墓参り。)	Rika Kihara	Izuru Kumasaka	April 19, 2023
12	"In drama, Christmas"; Transliteration: "Dorama no Nakade wa, Kurisumasu." (Japanese: ドラマの中では、クリスマス。)	Rika Kihara	Izuru Kumasaka	April 20, 2023
13	"A morning together" Transliteration: "Futari, Issho no Asa." (Japanese: ふたり、一緒の朝。)	Uiko Miura	Unknown	April 24, 2023
14	"A shopping mall miracle" Transliteration: "Shōten-gai no Kiseki." (Japanese: 商店街の奇跡。)	Uiko Miura	Unknown	April 25, 2023
15	"Hot spring trip with everyone!" Transliteration: "Min'na de Onsen Ryokō!" (Japanese: みんなで温泉旅行!)	Uiko Miura	Unknown	April 26, 2023
16	"After a good time" Transliteration: "Tanoshī Jikan no Ato ni." (Japanese: 楽しい時間のあとに。)	Uiko Miura	Unknown	April 27, 2023
17	"But I want you to know!" Transliteration: "Dake do, Wakatte Hoshikute!" (Japanese: だけど、わかってほしくて!)	Rika Kihara	Unknown	May 1, 2023
18	"Is it okay to cancel the marriage?" Transliteration: "Kon'in Kaijo Shite Daijōbu?" (Japanese: 婚姻解除して大丈夫?)	Uiko Miura	Unknown	May 2, 2023
19	"It's the day of the ceremony" Transliteration: "Gishiki no Hi desu." (Japanese: 儀式の日です。)	Uiko Miura	Unknown	May 3, 2023
20	"At the skating rink, the two of us" Transliteration: "Sukēto Rinku de, Futari wa." (Japanese: スケートリンクで、ふたりは。)	Uiko Miura	Unknown	May 4, 2023
21	"Bad news..." Transliteration: "Warui Shirase ga..." (Japanese: 悪い知らせが...。)	Rika Kihara	Unknown	May 8, 2023
22	"Thoughts to work, then to each other" Transliteration: "Shigoto e, Soshite Otagai e no Omoi." (Japanese: 仕事へ、そしてお互いへの思い。)	Arisa Tomiyama	Unknown	May 9, 2023
23	"Valentine's day for just the two of us" Transliteration: "Futaridake no Barentain." (Japanese: 二人だけのバレンタイン。)	Rika Kihara	Unknown	May 10, 2023
24	"Happy things, sad things" Transliteration: "Tanoshī koto, Kanashī koto." (Japanese: 楽しいこと、悲しいこと。)	Uiko Miura	Unknown	May 11, 2023
25	"What I learned from the commotion in the hospital" Transliteration: "Nyūin Sawagi de Wakatta koto." (Japanese: 入院騒ぎでわかったこと。)	Uiko Miura	Unknown	May 15, 2023
26	"Birthday is coming" Transliteration: "Tanjōbi ga Yattekuru." (Japanese: 誕生日がやってくる。)	Rika Kihara	Unknown	May 16, 2023
27	"It's tough being a newcomer, but..." Transliteration: "Shinjin wa Taihen desu, kedo..." (Japanese: 新人はたいへんです、けど...。)	Uiko Miura	Unknown	May 17, 2023
28	"A heart that thinks of that person" Transliteration: "Sono Hito o Omou Kokoro." (Japanese: その人を思う心。)	Uiko Miura	Unknown	May 18, 2023
29	"I decided to go home" Transliteration: "Kaeru koto ni Shimashita." (Japanese: 帰ることにしました。)	Uiko Miura	Unknown	May 22, 2023
30	"It's finally the final week, how is everyone's landing?" Transliteration: "Iyoiyo Saishū Shū, Min'na no Chakuchi wa?" (Japanese: いよいよ最終週、みんなの着地は?)	Uiko Miura	Unknown	May 23, 2023
31	"My determination that I want to tell" Transliteration: "Tsugetai Ketsui." (Japanese: 告げたい決意。)	Uiko Miura	Unknown	May 24, 2023
32	"Thanks"; Transliteration: "Arigatō." (Japanese: ありがとう。)	Uiko Miura	Unknown	May 25, 2023

=== Anime ===
In April 2022, it was announced that the series would receive an anime television series adaptation. It is produced by Asahi Production and directed by Ryuichi Kimura, with scripts written by Gigaemon Ichikawa, and character designs handled by Fuyuka Ōtaki. The series aired from April 9 to June 25, 2023, on Tokyo MX and BS11. (Note: Tokyo MX lists the series premiere at 25:30 JST on April 8, 2023, which is effectively 1:30 a.m. on April 9.) The opening theme song is "Tonari Awase" (となりあわせ) by Chinatsu Matsumoto, while the ending theme song is "Near Stella" by Yū Wakui.

The series has been streamed by Crunchyroll outside of East Asia. Medialink licensed the series in Asia and Oceania (except Australia and New Zealand) and streamed it on the Ani-One YouTube channels.

==== Episodes ====
No.	Title	Directed by	Written by	Storyboarded by	Original release date
1	"Crunch Time with the Princess"; Transliteration: "Hime to Shuraba" (Japanese: 姫と修羅場)	Yoshihisa Matsumoto	Gigaemon Ichikawa	Ryuichi Kimura	April 9, 2023
Manga artist Ichiro struggles to support himself and his siblings Machi and Fumio on the rent from a small apartment building he inherited following their father's death and their mother running away with another man. His workload increases when both his assistants quit, but his editor Masahiro finds him a new assistant named Shiori. Despite being self-taught and only 19, Shiori does the best work Ichiro has ever seen and is instantly liked by Machi and Fumio. Shiori reveals she only started reading her grandmothers manga collection when she was 18, one of which was Ichiro's main series Alice and the Knight of Thorns. After an all-nighter to meet a deadline, they both fall asleep at their desks. Upon awaking, Ichiro sees a craft pen stuck in Shiori's back. Fearing she is hurt, he grabs the pen and is transported into an infinite void. Shiori pulls him out and is angry he touched her while asleep, but forgives him because he thought she was hurt. She explains she is Princess of a species called Star-People and what Ichiro mistook for a pen was her stinger. By touching it, Ichiro is now her fated husband but as she desires a real marriage, she insists they must fall in love first.
2	"Shopping with the Princess"; Transliteration: "Hime to Okaimono" (Japanese: 姫とお買い物)	Kōji Shimada	Gigaemon Ichikawa	Shigeru Ueda	April 16, 2023
By custom, Shiori's parents should choose her husband, but she accepts fate has chosen Ichiro, though Ichiro is skeptical. After encountering Chihiro, Ichiro's cousin and apartment tenant, Shiori returns home. Ichiro passes out from fever so Shiori rushes back, explaining since they now share a bond, they must now remain close to each other or Ichiro will weaken and die. Ichiro accepts Shiori is telling the truth about everything when holding hands cures his fever. Shiori rents one of the apartments and asks some of her Star-People to discover if their engagement can be annulled. Requiring necessities, Ichiro takes Shiori shopping. Shiori explains that a meteorite hit their island, bringing an alien bacteria that first infected her grandmother, then spread to every islander. By coexisting with the bacteria, they gained powers and renamed themselves Star-People. Two men flirt with Shiori, but when Ichiro pulls her away he hurts her arm, causing his nose to bleed. Shiori blames herself, explaining her pain or even emotional upset will now affect his physical health, and regrets leaving her island. Ichiro insists it is alright she is trying to find happiness and promises to be more careful. Just in case the engagement can't be annulled, he also promises to learn how to be around her safely, making her smile.
3	"Drama Bomb with the Princess"; Transliteration: "Hime to Bakuhatsu" (Japanese: 姫と爆発)	Ichirō Suzuki	Misaki Morie	Sayoko Todobe	April 23, 2023
As part of his new learning process, Ichiro tests to see how far he can get from Shiori before becoming ill, discovering no affects within a few miles. As for contact Shiori suggests acting out scenes from romantic manga. Ichiro becomes extremely flustered but suffers no ill effects from casual touching. Shiori wonders if she could find a second job within the safe radius of a few miles. Masahiro asks Ichiro to rewrite his latest story to include more romantic scenes, but he suddenly suffers from severe writer's block. Shiori decides to introduce herself to the other tenants, leaving them letters and gifts in their mail boxes. Former tenant and Ichiro's childhood friend Momoka, who is also married to Masahiro, visits Ichiro and his siblings. Shiori learns Momoka writes one of her favourite manga, Master of Lion Fist, and asks to work with her but Momoka only draws on computers, which Shiori is unfamiliar with. Momoka offers her an old tablet to practice on. After Momoka leaves, Ichiro feels ill and realizes Shiori was jealous of his friendship with Momoka. Realizing she is jealous, Shiori deduces she must finally be in love with Ichiro.
4	"Weather Conditions with the Princess"; Transliteration: "Hime to Soramoyō" (Japanese: 姫と空もよう)	Yoshihisa Matsumoto	Kōki Hashimoto	Hirohide Shikishima	April 30, 2023
Following her revelation, Shiori asks to spend time alone. Ichiro has to cancel taking his siblings to the zoo due to rain. Due to Shiori's revelation, Ichiro cannot focus on making his manga more romantic. Shiori can't decide how to act around Ichiro so she spends time with Machi and Fumio, but accidentally tears one of Machi's precious tarot cards Ichiro painted for her. Ichiro volunteers to make a new set so Shiori goes to the library in the rain for a book on Machi's favourite fortune teller. When Shiori is gone a while, Ichiro goes to find her and they enjoy a walk home. Shiori and Ichiro draw the new cards together and help the delighted Machi put on a fortune telling performance. Ichiro discovers Machi's crystal ball is his old planetarium projector which he switches on. Shiori joins him under the projected stars and Ichiro tells her he still wants the engagement annulled. His rejection hurts Shiori so much bruises appear on Ichiro's body, until Ichiro then confesses that he loves her too and wants to date her properly before getting engaged. Shiori happily accepts then passes out from excitement.
5	"At the Zoo with the Princess"; Transliteration: "Hime to Dōbutsuen" (Japanese: 姫と動物園)	Hideaki Uehara	Gigaemon Ichikawa	Hideaki Uehara	May 7, 2023
Ichiro, his siblings, and Shiori finally go to the zoo. They let the kids enjoy seeing all the animals, but seeing Ichiro's hands occupied by his siblings, Shiori wishes for him to hold her own hand, but believes she is selfish by interfering in their family trip. However, Machi eventually discovers them, and they finally admit their relationship, which the kids accept immediately. Machi asks Shiori what she likes about Ichiro, and she wonders what Ichiro likes about her. She later gathers the courage ask him to hold her hand, which he happily does, delighting her. Meanwhile, back on Shiori's island, her family worries for her well-being, as they have not communicated with her since she left. Her mother Miyako worries the most, asking for any signal of Shiori be relayed to her. Back home, while Ichiro cleans the kitchen, a curious Shiori goes to ask him what he likes about her, but runs into Chihiro, nearly exposing their romance. She sees Ichiro asleep in a table, gently waking him, and asks him to allow her to touch his neck. He agrees, and they become closer together. However, as she goes to sleep, Shiori realizes she forgot to ask him.
6	"A Letter with the Princess"; Transliteration: "Hime to Otegami" (Japanese: 姫とお手紙)	Aoi Mori	Misaki Morie	Yasushi Muroya	May 14, 2023
Ichiro submits his new chapters and Masahiro is thrilled by the romantic scenes. Ichiro hopes to spend time with Shiori, but she is distracted by a job rejection from the artist Sano due to making a bad impression. To cheer her up he takes her, Machi and Fumio to a barbecue restaurant. Shiori reveals she is still learning to do as she pleases away from the restricted lifestyle she had growing up. Ichiro tries to be supportive but nervously muddles his words, leaving his meaning unclear. He returns to working straight away, worrying Shiori she upset him, though Ichiro is actually upset at himself for not being able to talk normally. He decides to write a letter but begins adding pictures, eventually turning his feelings into an explanatory manga. Ichiro worries about her reaction but Shiori is moved to tears by the feelings expressed in the manga and they become even closer. Sano later calls Ichiro to tell him that he was troubled on how to tell Ichiro that Shiori might be interested in him. Ichiro explains that Shiori is his girlfriend. Happy for his friend, Sano offers her a part time job as her work was excellent.
7	"A Slight Fever with the Princess"; Transliteration: "Hime to Binetsu" (Japanese: 姫と微熱)	Shigeru Ueda	Kōki Hashimoto	Shigeru Ueda	May 21, 2023
Having expressed their feelings, Ichiro and Shiori become awkward around each other. Ichiro, Chihiro, Machi and Fumio plan to visit their fathers grave; the children conspire to bring Shiori as well. Afterward they picnic in the park where Chihiro confirms they are dating. Seeing them mourn Shiori recalls the recent funeral of her grandmother, which by island tradition took place under the stars at night. The children return home with Chihiro but Ichiro visits the grave again to introduce Shiori as his girlfriend and hopes they will stay together forever, giving Shiori dreams of marriage. Shiori develops fever, causing Ichiro to wonder if Star-people need different treatment from humans. After making her food Shiori holds his hand until she falls asleep. Shiori recovers by morning and finds Ichiro accidentally fell asleep on her floor, meaning they shared a room all night. As he goes to leave Shiori is compelled to hug him for the first time. They are almost caught by Machi and Fumio, whom Ichiro distracts with breakfast, amusing Shiori.
8	"Christmas with the Princess"; Transliteration: "Hime to Kurisumasu" (Japanese: 姫とクリスマス)	Tadato Suzuki; Aoi Mori	Misaki Morie	Hideaki Uehara; Kunihiro Mori	May 28, 2023
Star People don't celebrate Christmas so Shiori looks forward to her first with Ichiro. Sano, Chihiro and Momoka join them for Christmas Eve celebrations where Shiori is delighted by their stories about Ichiro as a child. Shiori is unable to share stories about herself as they all include her being the Star Princess. Momoka finally gives Shiori her old tablet. Fumio goes to bed but Shiori and Machi sleep over in Chihiro's room. Shiori confesses to being a princess, which has caused problems for Ichiro, but Chihiro and Machi understand her desire for privacy. Having overheard, Ichiro guiltily realises he has still been hoping their fated marriage would be annulled. Deciding to do better he invites Shiori on a real date on Christmas Day. Shiori's mother Miyako is angrily confused why Shiori hasn't contacted them yet. On the date, Shiori feels guilty Ichiro still occasionally feels pain from their bond. Ichiro doesn't mind as he loves her, even asking her to keep dating him with the real goal of marrying. Shiori is so happy they share their first kiss. That night they are both so happy about the kiss they can't sleep. Shiori receives a text from her mother.
9	"A Hot Spring with the Princess"; Transliteration: "Hime to Onsen" (Japanese: 姫と温泉)	Kunihiro Mori	Kōki Hashimoto	Kunihiro Mori	June 4, 2023
Miyako wants Shiori to return home. They visit a shrine for the New Year where Shiori wins a family trip to Mt. Fuji. Shiori ignores Miyako's calls during the trip. After his siblings fall asleep, Ichiro can tell Shiori is upset so she admits she actually left the island without Miyako's permission. Ichiro will support whatever she chooses, making her feel better. She answers Miyako's next call but blurts out she has a boyfriend and Ichiro introduces himself. The shock makes Miyako end the call while Shiori can't stop laughing. Ichiro fears he has made things worse for Shiori. The islanders fear Shiori has been seduced by a conman so Miyako decides to bring Shiori home herself. Ichiro's continued guilt upsets Shiori so much he suffers through their link; only this time he enters the infinite void again. After Shiori retrieves him she is upset she can't even be mad at her mother without hurting Ichiro. Machi and Fumio buy them matching keyrings. Shiori decides to settle things once and for all. Ichiro confirms even if their link has to be annulled to save his life he would still like to marry her. They return home to find Shiori's parents and to other islanders already waiting for them.
10	"Family Meeting with the Princess"; Transliteration: "Hime to Kazoku Kaigi" (Japanese: 姫と家族会議)	Hideaki Uehara	Kōki Hashimoto	Hideaki Uehara	June 11, 2023
Miyako demands Shiori return to the island, but after seeing Ichiro realises he is not quite the sleazy conman they assumed. They agree to a proper meeting in the morning. The meeting begins badly as Miyako is hypercritical and stubborn; leading to Shiori accidentally revealing Ichiro unintentionally touched her stinger. Miyako is furious at their engagement, since Shiori is destined to be Queen and Ichiro is clearly unsuitable for her, so Shiori angrily leaves. Ichiro follows, explaining his strained relationship with his own mother, which he does not want Shiori to experience with Miyako. They return and agree to annul their engagement. Miyako believes she has won and is thrilled, but when Shiori still insists on staying to continue her manga career Miyako threatens to stop supporting her financially. Ichiro stands up for Shiori and her potential as an artist, so Miyako agrees Shiori can stay a year, but she will be reducing her financial support to force Shiori to support herself. Her father Ken agrees to properly research annulling the engagement but hints Shiori can always create manga from their island, making Ichiro think. Once they leave Shiori is grateful she had Ichiro to help her. Machi and Fumio decide everything will work out if Ichiro just marries Shiori.
11	"Stinger Removal with Kuga-kun"; Transliteration: "Kuga-kun to Togenuki" (Japanese: 久我くんと刺抜き)	Aoi Mori	Misaki Morie	Aoi Mori	June 18, 2023
The two islanders who accompanied Shiori's parents, Makado and Komaki, return to annul the engagement, which involves using forceps made from island meteorite, known as Yobi, to remove the stinger inside Ichiro. Makado warns Ichiro his love might be caused by the stinger and disappear once it is removed. Komaki, who has long had a crush on Shiori, reveals a piece of Yobi, allowing Shiori to use her psychic powers again, but Shiori insists she will not go home. Shiori has bad dreams as she also fears Ichiro's love might disappear. Komaki hopes once the engagement is over Shiori will return to the island and possibly choose him to be her husband. During the ceremony Ichiro drinks island sake, causing the stinger to emerge from his brain. Shiori sadly grabs it, causing Ichiro to flashback all the reasons he loves her, but he is too late and the stinger is extracted. Ichiro feels their bond vanish; almost breaking his heart, but is relieved he still loves her. Shiori is tearfully relieved Ichiro need never be hurt by the bond again. An upset Komaki is dragged away by Makado, who is also relieved their love survived the annulment.
12	"Fireworks with the Princess"; Transliteration: "Hime to Hanabi" (Japanese: 姫と花火)	Yoshihisa Matsumoto	Gigaemon Ichikawa	Ryuichi Kimura	June 25, 2023
Ichiro asks Shiori on a date. Wanting it to be special Shiori goes shopping with Chihiro for a more colourful outfit. Chihiro ends up admitting she is in love with Ichiro but knows it is impossible due to them being cousins. Ichiro asks Sano for date advice, ending up with new clothes and haircut. On the date they find their attraction to each other is more intense. During ice skating Shiori's determination to hold hands is hindered by Ichiro falling over, but after a heart to heart over their feelings on the annulment they manage to hold hands. The next day Ichiro realises with New Year and the hot spring trip they are over budget for the month. This coincides with Machi's field trip so she decides not to even tell Ichiro as he can't afford it. She also declines playing with her friends so Fumio won't be alone. Shiori is worried and Ichiro realises what is happening when Machi uncharacteristically starts crying, revealing everything they have been missing out on due to money or Ichiro's work schedule. Shiori immediately arranges an impromptu firework festival with friends in the garden to make up for it. Ichiro can't believe how lucky he was to meet her. Shiori decides once she has become self-sufficient as a manga artist she will ask Ichiro to marry her.

== See also ==
- Sweetness and Lightning, another manga series by the same author
- Yurayura Q, another manga series by the same author
