= Yurayura Q =

Japanese manga series

- First tankōbon volume cover

ゆらゆらQ
- Genre: Romantic comedy; Slice of life; Supernatural
- Manga
- Written by: Gido Amagakure
- Published by: Hakusensha
- Imprint: HC Special
- Magazine: The Hana to Yume
- Original run: October 25, 2019 – July 27, 2026
- Volumes: 5
- Anime television series

Yurayura Q (ゆらゆらQ) is a Japanese manga series written and illustrated by Gido Amagakure. It was originally published as two one-shot chapters, before being serialized in Hakusensha's The Hana to Yume magazine from October 2019 to July 2026. Five volumes have been released as of January 2026. An anime television series adaptation has been announced.

== Plot ==
Kyuuko Konno, a high school girl, is the daughter of a Shinto temple priest and a kitsune woman, and their ninth child. However, unlike her siblings who have normal, human appearances, she usually has a more fox-like appearance, manifesting fox ears and a fox tail. She tries to live a normal life at school and hide her true identity, with only her childhood friend Haruto Mizushima aware of who she really is. Despite Kyuuko's consciousness about her true self, she finds comfort in Haruto's kindness, knowing how he accepts her for who she is.

== Characters ==
Kyuuko Konno (今野 久子, Konno Kyūko)
Nicknamed Kyuuko (きゅーこ, Kyūko), she comes from a family of well-accomplished humans. As the ninth child of a Shinto priest and a kitsune, she is conscious about her origins and how she compares to her older siblings. As she is of mixed heritage, she has the ability to hide her fox-like appearance, although it sometimes resurfaces.
Haruto Mizushima (水島 春人, Mizushima Haruto)
Nicknamed Haru-kun (はるくん), he is Kyuuko's childhood friend. He is the only one apart from Kyuuko's family who is aware of her identity as part-fox girl. He is a member of the basketball club, and is popular among his fellow students due to his kind personality.

== Media ==
=== Manga ===
The series by Gido Amagakure was originally published as two one-shot chapters. Following positive reception, it was serialized in Hakusensha's The Hana to Yume magazine from October 25, 2019, to July 27, 2026. The first tankōbon volume was released on November 6, 2020; five volumes have been released as of January 20, 2026.

No.	Release date	ISBN
1	November 6, 2020	978-4-592-22801-1
2	April 20, 2022	978-4-592-22802-8
3	June 20, 2023	978-4-592-22803-5
4	August 20, 2024	978-4-592-23033-5
5	January 20, 2026	978-4-592-23113-4

=== Anime ===
An anime television series adaptation was announced on July 20, 2026.

== Reception ==
The series received a positive review in Da Vinci Web, with the reviewer praising the charming interactions between Kyuuko and her family and their love for her, as well as Kyuuko's character growth despite her sense of inferiority to her older siblings.

== See also ==
- A Galaxy Next Door, another manga series by the same author
- Sweetness and Lightning, another manga series by the same author
