= Kanako Nishi (author) =

Japanese writer and artist

- 西 加奈子
- Born: May 7, 1977 (age 49); Tehran, Iran
- Education: Kansai University
- Occupations: Novelist, essayist, artist
- Writing career
- Language: Japanese
- Genre: Fiction
- Notable works: Tsūtenkaku (通天閣); Fukuwarai (ふくわらい); Saraba! (サラバ!)
- Notable awards: Oda Sakunosuke Prize; Kawai Hayao Prize; Naoki Prize
- Website: Kanako Nishi Official Website

Kanako Nishi (西 加奈子, Nishi Kanako; born May 7, 1977) is a Japanese writer and artist. She has won the Oda Sakunosuke Prize, the Kawai Hayao Literary Prize, and the Naoki Prize, and several of her books have been adapted for film.

== Early life and education ==
Kanako Nishi was born in Tehran, Iran on May 7, 1977. Her family moved back to Japan at age 2, but her father's job took them away from Japan again to Cairo, Egypt when she was 7 years old. The Nishi family stayed in Cairo for four years, then returned to Izumi, Osaka. She later drew on this experience in creating the main character in her bestselling novel Saraba! Nishi attended junior high and high school in Izumi municipal schools. After high school, she attended Kansai University in Osaka.

== Career ==
At age 26, Nishi lied to her parents about getting a job in Tokyo, and left Osaka to pursue her dream of writing professionally. Her first book, the short story collection Aoi (「あおい」, "Blue"), was published in 2004. She has since published over 20 books, including novels, essay collections, short story collections, and illustrated children's books.

In 2006, Nishi's novel Tsūtenkaku (「通天閣」, lit. "Tower to heaven") won the Oda Sakunosuke Prize, which is named for the Buraiha writer Sakunosuke Oda. That same year Kanako's novel Kiiroi zou (「きいろいゾウ」, lit. "Yellow Elephant"), a story about a long-married couple who receive a mysterious letter that leads them to revisit the history of their relationship, was published by Shogakukan. It was later adapted into the 2013 film Kiiroi Zou, starring Aoi Miyazaki and Osamu Mukai. In 2011 her novel Entaku (「円卓」, lit. "Round table"), about the daily life of an elementary school girl who prefers to be alone, was published by Bungeishunjū. It was later adapted into a 2014 Isao Yukisada film starring Mana Ashida and Ryuhei Maruyama. Nishi's 2012 novel Fukuwarai (lit. "Funny Face"), about the relationships between an eccentric editor and the people around her, won the inaugural Kawai Hayao story prize, drawing praise from prize judge and novelist Nahoko Uehashi.

Nishi won the 152nd Naoki Prize in 2015 for her novel Saraba! (「サラバ！」, lit. "Farewell!"), which drew heavily on her childhood experiences in its portrayal of a male protagonist born in Iran who overcomes hardships while moving between Egypt and Japan. Saraba! drew particular praise from the committee members for its unorthodox style and language. Later that year Vogue Japan named Nishi one of its 2015 Women of the Year. In 2016 her novel Makuko (「まく子」), about an elementary school boy whose friendship with a new transfer student leads to his discovery of a big secret, was published by Fukuinkan Shoten. The novel was adapted into a 2019 film for Nikkatsu by screenwriter and director Keiko Tsuruoka, with Hikaru Yamazaki and Ninon in the lead roles.

In 2020, Kanako's previously published stories "Sam no Koto" (lit. "Sam") and "Saru ni Au" (lit. "Meet the Monkey") were adapted into a two-part television series for subscription channel dTV, with the main characters played by fourth generation members of idol group Nogizaka46. A new volume containing the adapted stories was scheduled for publication by Shogakukan in March 2020, prior to the show's premiere. That same year, director Hitoshi Yazaki adapted Nishi's novel Sakura, which had sold more than 500,000 copies since its publication in 2005, into a film starring Nana Komatsu, Takumi Kitamura, and Ryo Yoshizawa.

== Writing style ==
Nishi's characters frequently use Osaka-ben, the distinctive Japanese dialect common in Osaka and surrounding cities. She often writes words in hiragana rather than kanji to allow multiple interpretations, and for aesthetic effect. Her English translator, Allison Markin Powell, has said that Nishi's writing is "deceptively simple yet beautiful", and that it "establishes an immediate intimacy with her characters." Her work addresses issues in "religion, individualism, and society", especially during times of upheaval and disaster.

== Personal life ==
Nishi started reading The Bluest Eye by Toni Morrison as a first-year high school student and has preferred reading foreign authors ever since. Her favorite author is Chimamanda Ngozi Adichie. Nishi is a fan of professional wrestling, particularly New Japan Pro-Wrestling.

== Recognition ==
- 2006: Oda Sakunosuke Prize for Tsūtenkaku (「通天閣」, lit. "Tower to heaven")
- 2012: Kawai Hayao Literary Prize for Fukuwarai (「ふくわらい」, lit. "Funny face")
- 2015: 152nd Naoki Prize (2014下) for Saraba! (「サラバ！」, lit. "Farewell!")

== Adaptations ==
=== Film ===
- Kiiroi Zou (Yellow Elephant), 2013
- Entaku: Kokko, Hitonatsu no Imagine (Round Table), 2014
- Makuko, 2019
- Sakura, 2020
- Fortune Favors Lady Nikuko, 2021

=== Television ===
- Sam no Koto/Saru ni Au, dTV, 2020

== Works ==
=== Books in Japanese ===
==== Fiction ====
- Aoi, Shogakukan, 2004, ISBN 9784093861373
- Sakura, Shogakukan, 2005, ISBN 9784093861472
- Kiiroi zou, Shogakukan, 2006, ISBN 9784093861625
- Tsūtenkaku, Chikuma Shobo, 2006, ISBN 9784480803993
- Shizuku, Kobunsha, 2007, ISBN 9784334925444
- Koufuku midori no, Shogakukan, 2008, ISBN 9784093862066
- Mado no sakana, Shinchosha, 2008, ISBN 9784103070412
- Utsukushii hito, Gentosha, 2009, ISBN 9784344016347
- Kiriko ni tsuite, Kadokawa, 2009, ISBN 9784048739313
- Enjō suru kimi, Kadokawa, 2010, ISBN 9784048740579
- Shiroi shirushi, Shinchosha, 2010, ISBN 9784103070429
- Entaku, Bungeishunju, 2011, ISBN 9784163299808
- Fortune Favors Lady Nikuko, Gentosha, 2011, ISBN 9784344020498
- Chika no hato, Bungeishunju, 2011, ISBN 9784163810607
- Fukuwarai, Asahi Shimbun, 2012, ISBN 9784022509987
- Furu, Kawade Shobo Shinsha, 2012, ISBN 9784309021485
- Butai, Kodansha, 2014, ISBN 9784062187084
- Saraba!, Shogakukan, 2014, ISBN 9784093863926 (vol. 1) ISBN 9784093863933 (vol. 2)
- Makuko, Fukuinkan Shoten, 2016, ISBN 9784834082388
- i, Popurasha, 2016, ISBN 9784591153093
- Omajinai, Chikuma Shobo, 2018, ISBN 9784480804778
- Sam no Koto, Saru ni Au, Shogakukan, 2020, ISBN 9784094067552

==== Illustrated books ====
- Medama to yagi, LD&K Books, 2012, ISBN 9784905312314
- Kimi wa umi, Switch Library, 2015, ISBN 9784884184469

==== Nonfiction ====
- Mikkī kashimashi, Chikuma Shobo, 2007, ISBN 9784480814869
- Mikkī takumashi, Chikuma Shobo, 2009, ISBN 9784480815033
- Gohan gururi, NHK Publishing, 2013, ISBN 9784140056363
- Manimani, Kadokawa, 2015, ISBN 9784040677934

=== Selected work in translation ===
- "Merry Christmas," English trans. Allison Markin Powell, fiftystorms.org
- "Fear of Manners," English trans. Allison Markin Powell, Words Without Borders, May 2017 issue.
- "Burn," English trans. Allison Markin Powell, Freeman's: Power, Fall 2018 issue.
- Sakura, English trans. Allison Markin Powell, Harper Collins, 2026.
