= Reminiscence (2017 film) =

- Film poster
- Kanji: 追憶
- Revised Hepburn: Tsuioku
- Directed by: Yasuo Furuhata
- Screenplay by: Takeshi Aoshima; Tomoyuki Takimoto
- Starring: Junichi Okada; Shun Oguri; Tasuku Emoto; Masami Nagasawa; Fumino Kimura; Sakura Ando; Hidetaka Yoshioka
- Cinematography: Daisaku Kimura
- Edited by: Keiichi Itagaki
- Music by: Akira Senju
- Production companies: Toho; Dentsu; WOWOW; Shogakukan; J Storm; Asahi Shimbun; Mainichi Shimbun; Jiji Press; Hankyu Hanshin Express; Kinoshita Group; Nippon Shuppan Hanbai Inc.; Tokyu Agency; Hikari TV; GyaO!; Chunichi Shimbun; Kitanihon Shimbun
- Distributed by: Toho
- Release date: May 6, 2017 (Japan)
- Running time: 98 minutes
- Country: Japan
- Language: Japanese

Reminiscence (Japanese: 追憶, Hepburn: Tsuioku) is a 2017 Japanese mystery drama film directed by Yasuo Furuhata.

== Cast ==
- Junichi Okada as Atsushi Shikata
- Shun Oguri as Keita Tadokoro
- Tasuku Emoto as Satoru Kawabata
- Masami Nagasawa as Minako Shikata
- Fumino Kimura as Mari Tadokoro
- Kenichi Yajima
- Takahiro Miura
- Kiyohiko Shibukawa
- Lily
- Naomi Nishida
- Sakura Ando as Ryoko Nishina
- Hidetaka Yoshioka as Mitsuo Yamagata
