= Tasuku Emoto =

Japanese actor (born 1986)

- 柄本 佑
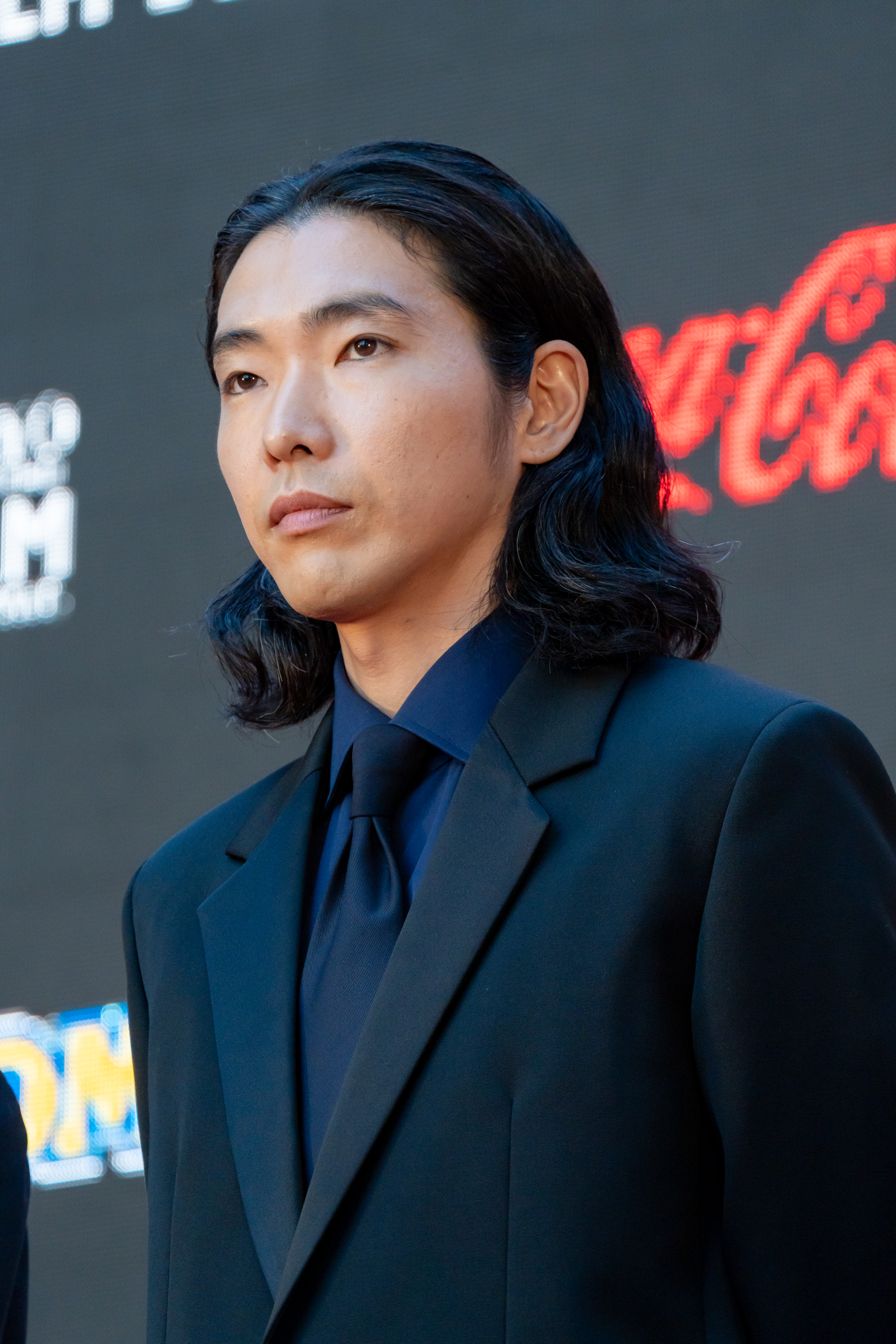
- Emoto at the 36th Tokyo International Film Festival in October 2023
- Born: December 16, 1986 (age 39); Tokyo, Japan
- Education: Wako High School; Waseda University Art School
- Occupation: Actor
- Years active: 2003–present
- Agent: Alpha Agency
- Known for: Asa ga Kita; Utsukushī Natsu Kirishima
- Spouse: Sakura Ando (m. 2012)
- Children: 1
- Parents: Akira Emoto (father); Kazue Tsunogae (mother)
- Relatives: Tokio Emoto (brother); Eiji Okuda (father-in-law); Kazu Ando (mother-in-law); Momoko Ando (sister-in-law); Honami Sato (sister-in-law)
- Awards: 77th Kinema Junpo Award for Best Newcomer (Utsukushī Natsu Kirishima); 13th Japanese Movie Critics Rookie Award (Utsukushī Natsu Kirishima)
- Website: Official profile

Tasuku Emoto (柄本 佑, Emoto Tasuku; born December 16, 1986, in Tokyo) is a Japanese actor. His father is actor Akira Emoto, his mother is actress Kazue Tsunogae, his brother is actor Tokio Emoto, and his wife is actress Sakura Ando.

== Biography ==
Emoto was born in Tokyo in 1986. In 2001, he was a student at Wako High School.

Later in the year, Emoto passed the audition for the film Utsukushī Natsu Kirishima. He debuted in the film as the protagonist Yasuo Hidaka in 2003. This started Emoto's acting career. In 2004, he was awarded the 77th Kinema Junpo Award for Best Newcomer and the 13th Japanese Movie Critics Rookie Award for his role.

In 2005, Emoto went to the video department at Waseda University Art School. In March 2012, he married actress Sakura Ando and have a daughter born in June 2017.

== Filmography ==
=== TV series ===
Year	Title	Role	Notes	Ref.
2003	R.P.G.			
2003	Yankee Bokō ni Kaeru	Junichi Ohinata		
2004	Socrates in Love	Kenryo Nakagawa		
2004	Akai Tsuki			
2005	Water Boys 2005 Natsu	Shunichiro Koma		
2007	Tokyo Tower: Mom and Me, and Sometimes Dad	Kohei Yamada		
2007	Fūrin Kazan	Chōkyū	Taiga drama	
2007	Aoi Hitomi to New Age	Keiichi Zaizen		
2008	Shin Kyoto Meikyū Annai season 5		Episode 4	
2008	Tokugawa Ieyasu to Sannin no Onna	Kobayakawa Hideaki	TV movie	
2008	Torihada 3		Episode 1	
2008	Judge: Shima no Saibankan Funtō-ki season 2	Noboru Inamura	Episode 2	
2008	Ochaberi	Yuki Kimura	Episode 9	
2008	Soratobu Tire	Shunichi Kadota		
2009	Yakō no Kaidan	Shigeo Hasuda		
2009	Shibatora	Nishijima		
2009	Romes/Kūkō Bōgyo System	Sakurai		
2010	GeGeGe no Nyōbō	Shin Sugai	Asadora	
2011	Control: Hanzai Shinri Sōsa	Tamotsu Koyanagi	Episode 2	
2011	Tare Yori mo Kimi o Aisu	Goro Sakuma		
2011	The Last Supper	Keita Takamura	TV movie	
2011	Umu to Umareru Sore Kara no Koto	Takeshi Sato	Lead role	
2011	Kyoto Chiken no Onna season 7	Ippei Hatayama	Episode 8	
2012	Daichi no Fanfare	Yuto Moriyama		
2012	Run60	Shoji Nakatsuka	Episodes 7 to 9	
2012	Osozaki no Himawari: Boku no Jinsei, Renewal	Hiroki Matsumoto		
2013	Shotenin Michiru no Minoue Banashi	Kyutaro Uebayashi		
2013	Stray Dog	Ginji Yagishita		
2013	Tonbi	An-chan	Episode 7	
2013	Haitatsu sa Retai Watashitachi	Gunkan		
2013	Wonda×AKB48 Short Story: Fortune Cookie	Yamashiro		
2013	Kumogiri Nizaemon	Ingakozo Rokunosuke		
2013	Olympic no Minoshirokin	Yamamoto		
2014	Iryu: Team Medical Dragon – 4	Shogo Hayakawa		
2014	Wakamono-tachi 2014	Yo Sato		
2015	The Emperor's Cook	Tatsuyoshi Yamagami		
2015	Miyakobito no Hisokana Tanoshimi			
2015	Shokubutsu Danshi Veranda Season 2	Keiichi Hanazono		
2015	Here Comes Asa!	Sobee Bizan	Asadora	
2016	Josei Sakka Mysteries: Utsukushiki Mittsu no Uso	Kinoshita	Episode 2	
2016	Never Let Me Go	Kato	From episode 7	
2016	Okasina Otoko	Kiyoshi Atsumi	Lead role; TV movie	
2019	Ieyasu, Edo wo Tateru	Shōzaburō Hashimoto		
2019	Natsuzora: Natsu's Sky	Ryūichi Kurata	Asadora	
2019	Idaten	Masuno	Taiga drama	
2021	Heaven and Hell: Soul Exchange	Riku Watanabe		
2022	Love with a Case	Ruka Kotori		
2022	Modern Love Tokyo	Keisuke Yamada	Lead role; episode 2	
2024	Dear Radiance	Fujiwara no Michinaga	Taiga drama	

=== Film ===
Year	Title	Role	Notes	Ref.
2003	A Boy's Summer in 1945	Yasuo Hidaka	Lead role	
2003	Gūzen ni mo Saiakuna Shōnen			
2004	69	Tatsuo Zokaki		
2004	Hasami Otoko			
2005	Yaji and Kita: The Midnight Pilgrims	Dondon		
2005	Shissō	Shuichi		
2005	Jū Nana-sai no Fūkei: Shōnen wa Nani o Mita ka		Lead role	
2005	Spring Snow			
2006	Chekeratcho!!	Yu Honbu		
2006	Yoru no Picnic	Koichiro Takami		
2006	Hatsukoi	Takeshi		
2006	Kowai Ona: Hagane	Mikio Sekiguchi	Lead role	
2006	Boy Meets Pusan	Kurihara	Lead role	
2006	Chanko	Joji Makimura		
2007	Lemon no Koro	Tomizo Sasaki		
2007	Shikyū no Kioku: Koko ni Anata ga Iru	Masato		
2007	Freesia	Ichiro Yamada		
2007	Hannin ni Tsugu	Muranishi		
2008	Gummy Chocolate Pine	Kazutoyo Yamanoue		
2008	Chameleon			
2008	Last Game: Saigo no Sōkei-sen	Akirami Kurokawa		
2008	Heibon Punch			
2008	Flying Rabbits	Takuya Miki		
2008	Namidatsubo	Domoto		
2009	Shugo Tenshi	Harvest		
2009	a life	Kawarazaki		
2009	Boat			
2009	Air Doll	Toru		
2009	Bokura wa Aruku, Tada Soredake	Miyuki's former lover		
2010	No Longer Human			
2010	Tokyo Jima	Oraga		
2010	Raiou	Shigeji		
2010	Kenta to Jun to Kayo-chan no Kuni	Yosuke		
2010	Wakiyaku Monogatari	Masaru		
2010	GeGeGe no Nyōbō	Genta Sakuma		
2011	Tada's Do-It-All House			
2011	We Can't Change the World. But, We Wanna Build a School in Cambodia.	Shi Shibayama		
2011	Kichijōji no Asahina-kun	Hiroki Fujimura		
2012	Rinjō: Gekijō-ban	Susumu Hatano		
2012	The Castle of Crossed Destinies	Sojiro Akimoto / narrator		
2012	We Were There	Atsushi		
2013	A Story of Yonosuke	Ozawa		
2013	Kiiroi Zou	Kosoku (voice)		
2013	Hello, My Dolly Girlfriend	Kentaro Uchiyama	Lead role	
2013	A Tale Of Samurai Cooking - A True Love Story	Sadanoshin Imai		
2014	A Bolt from the Blue			
2015	Blood Bead			
2015	Gonin Saga	Keiichi Morisawa		
2015	Piece of Cake	Masaki		
2017	Reminiscence	Satoru Kawabata		
2018	Dynamite Graffiti	Akira Suei	Lead role	
2018	And Your Bird Can Sing	I	Lead role	
2019	The Island of Cats	Kentarō Wakamura		
2019	The Great War of Archimedes	Sub-lieutenant Tanaka		
2019	Iwane: Sword of Serenity			
2019	It Feels So Good		Lead role	
2020	Shape of Red			
2020	I Never Shot Anyone			
2020	Blue, Painful, Fragile	Wakisaka		
2021	Peaceful Death	Hitoshi Kawada	Lead role	
2021	Sensei, Would You Sit Beside Me?	Toshio	Lead role	
2021	Inu-Oh	Ashikaga Yoshimitsu (voice)		
2022	The Midnight Maiden War			
2022	Anime Supremacy!	Osamu Yukishiro		
2022	Riverside Mukolitta	Tsutsumishita		
2022	No Place to Go	Kengo		
2022	Re/Member	Yashiro		
2023	Shin Kamen Rider	Hayato Ichimonji / Kamen Rider 2		
2023	A Spoiling Rain	Izeki		
2023	Picture of Spring	Shunsuke Tsujimoto		
2025	Yasuko, Songs of Days Past	Employee		
2025	The Stars and Moon are Holes in the Sky			
2026	Samurai Vengeance	Kase Soichiro	Lead role	
2026	Memorizu	Yuta	Lead role	
2026	The Samurai and the Prisoner	Saika Sagehari		
2026	Between Two Lovers	Morio		
2026	Guilt	Tsutomu Godai		
2027	Last Dance	Yuto Mikami	Lead role	

=== Television animation ===
Year	Title	Role	Notes	Ref.
2016	Erased	Kenya Kobayashi (26 years old)		
2023	Crayon Shin-chan	Hayato Ichimonji / Kamen Rider 2	Episode 1173	

=== Dubbing ===
- The Bears' Famous Invasion of Sicily (Gedeone)
- The Wild Robot (Fink)
