= Shotenin Michiru no Minoue Banashi =

Japanese television series

- Starring: Erika Toda; Kengo Kora; Tasuku Emoto; Hirofumi Arai; Nao Omori
- Country of origin: Japan
- Original language: Japanese
- No. of seasons: 1
- No. of episodes: 10

Original release
- Network: NHK
- Release: January 8 – March 12, 2013

Shotenin Michiru no Minoue Banashi (書店員ミチルの身の上話) is a Japanese television drama series.

== Cast ==
- Erika Toda as Michiru
- Kengo Kora as Takei
- Tasuku Emoto as Kyutarou
- Hirofumi Arai as Toyomasu
- Nao Omori
