= Don Quixote (TV series) =

- Starring: Shota Matsuda; Katsumi Takahashi; Riko Narumi; Yuki Uchida; Satomi Kobayashi
- Country of origin: Japan
- Original language: Japanese
- No. of seasons: 1
- No. of episodes: 11

Original release
- Network: NTV
- Release: July 9 – September 24, 2011

Don Quixote (ドン★キホーテ) is a Japanese television drama series that aired on NTV from July 9 to September 24, 2011.

== Plot ==
In this unusual story, Shota Matsuda plays a child welfare official Shirota working at a child consultation center, while Takahashi Katsumi plays a charitable yakuza boss Sabashima. These two lead completely different lives, but one day, their souls are suddenly switched. As a result, Shirota begins dispensing odd advice about the "rules of society" and other things. While his colleagues naturally see this as a problem, the children gradually come to rely on him.

== Cast ==
- Shota Matsuda as Masataka Shirota
- Katsumi Takahashi as Jun Sabashima
  - Ryōsuke Makioka as young Jun Sabashima
- Riko Narumi as Sachiko Matsuura
  - Ando Kokoha as young Sachiko Matsuura
- Mayuko Kawakita as Eri, Sachiko's friend
- Mao Ueda as Hikari, Sachiko's friend
- Satomi Kobayashi as Mineko Mizumori, the director of the Child Guidance Center
- Hiroki Miyake as Sousuke Nishiwaki, chief child welfare officer
- Miwako Ichikawa as Aki Namba, child welfare officer
- Mahiru Konno as Yasuko Kodama, child welfare officer
- Ai Tamura as Kaede Noguchi, child psychologist
- Kenkichi Watanabe as Jinji Oomori, pediatrician
- Seijun Nobukawa as Yamada, staff member
- 5th Reireisha Bafū as Shuzo Iwashihara
- Hakuryu as Kameo Usagida
- Yuki Uchida as Ayumi Sabashima
- Yutaka Matsushige as Daisuke Hyodo
- Kazuma Yamane as Yasu
- Ken Aoki as Ken
- Masaki Suda as Kazuya Akashi
