= Masato Sakai =

Japanese actor

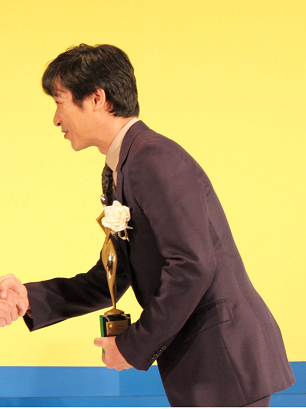
- Sakai in 2014
- Born: October 14, 1973 (age 53); Kobe, Japan ancestral home: Miyazaki, Miyazaki, Japan
- Occupation: Actor
- Years active: 1992–present
- Spouse: Miho Kanno (m. 2013)
- Children: 2
- Website: sakai-masato.com

Masato Sakai (堺 雅人) is a Japanese actor. He is best known for the Hanzawa Naoki series, which achieved the highest television ratings in Japan during the Heisei era (1989–2019).

== Career ==
Sakai aspired to become a bureaucrat until high school, but when he entered university, he decided to pursue a career as an actor.

He won the award for best actor at the 31st Yokohama Film Festival for The Wonderful World of Captain Kuhio and The Chef of South Polar and the award for best supporting actor at the 2008 Nikkan Sports Film Award, at the 33rd Hochi Film Award and at the 51st Blue Ribbon Awards. He also received a nomination for best supporting actor at the 32nd Japan Academy Film Prize.

== Personal life ==
He is married to Japanese actress and J-pop singer Miho Kanno. He has two children with his wife, eldest being a boy born in 2015 and the younger being a girl born in 2018.

== Filmography ==
=== Film ===
Year	Title	Role	Notes	Ref.
2000	Himawari	Yuichi Hirano		
2000	Mars Sweet Home	Toru Nakajima		
2000	The Goddess of 1967	Roadside noodle eater	Walk-on part	
2001	Stake Out (張り込み)	Yasuo Arakawa		
2001	Being Here (Japanese film)	Etsuro Maeno	Lead Role	
2002	Tarou (太郎 (2002))	Satoshi	Lead Role	
2003	When the Last Sword Is Drawn	Okita Sōji		
2006	Honey and Clover	Shūji Hanamoto		
2007	The Wall Man	Nishina	Lead role	
2008	After School	Kazuki Kimura		
2009	The Chef of South Polar	Nishimura	Lead role	
2009	The Wonderful World of Captain Kuhio	Captain Kuhio	Lead role	
2011	My So Has Got Depression	Mikio		
2012	Key of Life	Sakurai	Lead role	
2017	Destiny: The Tale of Kamakura	Masakazu Isshiki	Lead role	
2018	Sakura Guardian in the North	Shūjirō Ezure		
2022	Dr. Coto's Clinic 2022	Kei Narumi	Cameo appearance	
2025	A Moon in the Ordinary (平場の月)	Kensho Aoto	Lead role	
2026	Vivant: The Movie	Yūsuke Nogi	Lead role	

=== Television ===
==== Drama ====
Year	Title	Role	Notes	Ref.
2000	Audrey	Hideki Sugimoto	Asadora	
2001	The Scarlet Camellia	Tokujiro		
2001	The Scent of Jealousy	Tetsushi Nakahara		
2002	Extramarital Love	Takuya Yuasa		
2004	Shinsengumi!	Yamanami Keisuke	Taiga drama	
2005	Engine	Gen'ichiro Torii		
2005	Flying Trapeze	Kohei Yamashita	TV movie	
2006	Izumo no Okuni	Sankuro	Final installment of NHK's "Friday Period Drama" series, broadcast since 1966	
2006	The Woman Opposite	Shuji Tamura		
2006	Dr. Coto's Clinic	Kei Narumi	Season 2	
2007	The Secret Garden	Kataoka Wataru		
2007	Kodoku no kake ~Itoshiki hito yo~	Jiro Makita		
2008	Atsuhime	Tokugawa Iesada	Taiga drama	
2008	Flower of Ice	Takayuki Seno	TV Asahi 50th Anniversary Drama Special	
2008	Be yourself	Yasushi Enomoto	Lead role; TV Movie	
2009	Triangle	Shimano Takaya	Kansai Television Broadcasting's 50th Anniversary special	
2009	Summer for Bureaucrats	Niwano Takahisa		
2011	Antarctica	Himuro Haruhiko		
2012–13	Legal High	Kensuke Komikado	Lead role; 2 seasons	
2013–20	Naoki Hanzawa	Naoki Hanzawa	Lead role; 2 seasons	
2015	Dr. Rintaro, Psychiatrist	Dr. Rintarō Hino	Lead role	
2016	Sanada Maru	Sanada Yukimura	Lead role; Taiga drama	
2023–26	Vivant	Yūsuke Nogi / F, Liu Mingxuan	Lead role; 2 seasons	

==== Programs ====
Year	Title	Role	Notes	Ref.
2026	77th NHK Kōhaku Uta Gassen	Host		

=== Dubbing ===
Live-action

Year	Title	Role	Voice dub for	Notes	Ref.
2018	Christopher Robin	Christopher Robin	Ewan McGregor		

Animation

Year	Title	Role	Notes	Ref.
1996-2001	KochiKame: Tokyo Beat Cops	Reiji Shiratori		
2002-2005	Sentou Yousei Yukikaze	Rei Fukai	Lead role, OVA	
2009	Aoi Bungaku	Ōba Yōzō (eps 1–4); Shirimaru (eps 5–6); Sensei (eps 7–8); Melos (eps 9–10); Ryoushuu, Sensei (ep 11–12); Narrator/Navigator (eps 1–12)	Lead role	
2011	Buddha: The Great Departure	Chapra	Film	
2019	Promare	Kray Foresight	Film	
2024	Migration	Mack Mallard		

=== Theater ===
Year	Title	Role	Ref.
1995	Honmoku Macbeth (本牧マクベス)		
1995	Kozak (コサック)		
1996	Vibe (バイブ)		
1997	The Soul of Mandarin (ソウル・オブ・マンダリン)		
