= Nonchan Noriben =

Japanese manga and television series

- First tankōbon volume cover

のんちゃんのり弁
- Manga
- Written by: Kiwa Irie
- Published by: Kodansha
- Magazine: Weekly Morning
- Original run: August 1994 – July 1997
- Volumes: 4
- Television drama
- Original run: February 3, 1997 – March 28, 1997
- Television drama
- Original run: June 1, 1998 – July 31, 1998
- Live-action film
- Directed by: Akira Ogata
- Released: 2009
- icon

Nonchan Noriben (Japanese: のんちゃんのり弁; lit. 'Non-chan's Seaweed Bento') is a Japanese manga series written and illustrated by Kiwa Irie. It was serialized in Kodansha's seinen manga magazine Weekly Morning from 1994 to 1997. It was adapted into two television drama series in 1997 and 1998 and a live-action film in 2009.

== Media ==
=== Manga ===
Written and illustrated by Kiwa Irie, Nonchan Noriben was serialized in Kodansha's seinen manga magazine Weekly Morning, beginning in 1994 in that year's combined 36th/37th issue, and finishing in 1997 in that year's 31st issue (cover dated August 25, 1994, and July 17, 1997, respectively). Its chapters were compiled in four tankōbon volumes, published between April 19, 1995, and May 20, 1998.

== Awards ==
31st Yokohama Film Festival

- Best Director - Akira Ogata
- Best Actress - Manami Konishi
- Best Supporting Actor - Yoshinori Okada
- 4th Best Film
