= Akira Ogata (film director) =

Japanese film director (born 1959)

- Born: 1959 (age 65–66); Saga, Japan
- Occupation: Film director

Akira Ogata (緒方明) is a Japanese film director. He was given the Directors Guild of Japan New Directors Award for his film, Boy's Choir, in 2000, and then won the award for best director at the 31st Yokohama Film Festival for Nonchan Noriben.

== Filmography ==
- Tokyo Cabbageman K (1980)
- Boy's Choir (2000)
- Itsuka dokusho suruhi (2005)
- Nonchan Noriben (2009)
- Shin Godzilla (2016, as an actor)
- Kyoto Hippocrates (2026)
