= Crime or Punishment?!? =

Crime or Punishment ?!?
- Film poster
- Directed by: Keralino Sandorovich
- Starring: Riko Narumi; Kento Nagayama; Sakura Ando
- Release date: February 28, 2009 (Japan)
- Country: Japan
- Language: Japanese

Crime or Punishment ?!? (Japanese: 罪とか罰とか, Hepburn: Tsumitoka batsutoka) is a 2009 Japanese film directed by Keralino Sandorovich.

== Awards ==
31st Yokohama Film Festival

- Won: Best Supporting Actress - Sakura Ando
