= The Wonderful World of Captain Kuhio =

- DVD cover
- Directed by: Daihachi Yoshida
- Screenplay by: Daihachi Yoshida and Masahito Kagawa
- Story by: Kazumasa Yoshida
- Based on: Kekkon Sagishi Kuhio Taisa by Kazumasa Yoshida
- Produced by: Shuji Kakimoto
- Starring: Masato Sakai; Sakura Ando
- Cinematography: Shoichi Ato
- Edited by: Kumi Okada
- Music by: Tatsuo Kondo
- Production companies: Captain Kuhio Production Partners & Monster Ultra
- Distributed by: Showgate
- Release date: October 10, 2009
- Running time: 113 min
- Country: Japan
- Language: Japanese

The Wonderful World of Captain Kuhio (Japanese: クヒオ大佐, Hepburn: Kuhio Taisa; lit. "Captain Kuhio") is a 2009 Japanese comedy-crime film, directed by Daihachi Yoshida, based on Kazumasa Yoshida's 2006 biographical novel, Kekkon Sagishi Kuhio Taisa (lit. "Marriage swindler Captain Kuhio"), that focuses on a real-life marriage swindler, who conned over 100 million yen (US$1.2 million) from a number of women between the 1970s and the 1990s.

The film was released in Japan on 10 October 2009.

== Cast ==
- Masato Sakai as Captain Kuhio
- Yasuko Matsuyuki as Shinobu Nagano
- Hikari Mitsushima as Haru Yasuoka
- Yuko Nakamura as Michiko Sudo
- Hirofumi Arai as Tatsuya Nagano
- Kazuya Kojima as Koichi Takahashi
- Sakura Ando as Rika Kinoshita
- Masaaki Uchino as Chief Fujiwara
- Kanji Furutachi as Shigeru Kuroda
- Reila Aphrodite
- Sei Ando

== Awards ==
At the 31st Yokohama Film Festival

- Best Actor – Masato Sakai
- Best Supporting Actress – Sakura Ando
