= Love Exposure =

2008 film by Sion Sono

- Film poster

Japanese name
- Kanji: 愛のむきだし
Transcriptions
- Revised Hepburn: Ai no mukidashi
- Directed by: Sion Sono
- Written by: Sion Sono
- Produced by: Haruo Umekawa
- Starring: Takahiro Nishijima; Hikari Mitsushima; Sakura Ando
- Cinematography: Sōhei Tanikawa
- Edited by: Junichi Itō
- Music by: Tomohide Harada
- Distributed by: Phantom Film
- Release date: November 29, 2008 (Tokyo FILMeX)
- Running time: 237 minutes
- Country: Japan
- Language: Japanese

Love Exposure (Japanese: 愛のむきだし, Hepburn: Ai no mukidashi) is a 2008 Japanese epic romantic comedy-drama action film written and directed by Sion Sono. The film gained a considerable amount of notoriety in film festivals around the world for its four-hour runtime and themes including love, family, lust, religion and the art of upskirt photography. The first version was originally six hours long, but was trimmed at the request of the producers. However, an extended version was later released in 2017 as a 300-minute, 10-episode TV series, an arrangement also employed for two other of his movies. In 2026 for the remastered 4k release of the film by New Wave Media, the 10-episode TV series version of the film was recut to 276-minutes (6 episodes), reportedly due to lost footage.

Following its release, it won many awards and received acclaim from critics. At the Berlin International Film Festival, it won the Caligari Film Award and the FIPRESCI Prize.

== Plot ==
Yū Honda is a Catholic teenager attempting to live his life faithfully. His father, Tetsu, has become a devout Catholic priest following the death of Yū's mother and operates his own church. Tetsu asks Yū to confess his sins, but Yū believes he is a good person who has little to confess. To appease his father, he makes up sins but his father sees right through him so Yū becomes obsessed with committing real sins. Yū befriends other boys and is taught to steal, fight, and take stealth photographs up women's skirts. Yū promptly becomes a skilled "panty shot" photographer. Though perceived as a pervert, he is never aroused by these photographs.

After Yū loses a bet with his friends, he agrees to go into the city dressed as a woman and kiss a girl he likes. When they go into the city, Yū and his friends come across Yōko, his "Virgin Mary" who is surrounded by a group of thugs. Still dressed as a woman, he helps Yōko, a skilled fighter herself, beat up the gang. Afterwards he kisses Yōko and runs away. Yū falls in love with her – the first time he's been in love with a girl – but Yōko falls for his disguise and develops feelings for his alter ego Sasori, or "Miss Scorpion".

Meanwhile, Yū is being followed by Aya Koike, a member of the cult "Zero Church", who has become infatuated with him after she catches him taking a picture of her panties. Aya, who turned violent after being sexually abused to the point of insanity, plans to bring Yū's entire family into the Zero Church and masquerades as Sasori to gain Yōko's favor.

Aya manipulates those around Yū and Yōko and Yū's family become caught up in the Zero Church. Yū desperately tries to free Yōko from the cult by kidnapping her but fails to persuade her to leave as she does not trust him to be Miss Scorpion and is convinced he is a pervert. Armed with a sword, Yū breaks into the Zero Church's building and again tries to escape with Yōko. Aya, who is present along with Yū's family, fights back, but commits suicide by driving the sword through her stomach when she realizes Yū's love for Yōko.

Yū is taken to a mental hospital, where he has forgotten all of his past and convinced himself that he is really Sasori. Yōko comes to visit, claiming that she now realises that she loves him as he was the one always trying to save her. Yū cannot remember who she is, so security escort the hysterical Yōko out of the building. Moments later, Yū remembers her and escapes from the hospital, running after the car driving Yōko away. Yū catches up, smashes open the car window, and joins hands with Yōko.

== Cast ==
- Takahiro Nishijima as Yū Honda
- Hikari Mitsushima as Yōko Ozawa
- Sakura Ando as Aya Koike
- Makiko Watanabe as Kaori Fujiwara
- Atsuro Watabe as Tetsu Honda
- Jai West as Bosozoku Leader
- Nasubi as X
- Yutaka Shimizu as Yûji
- Hiroyuki Onoue as Takahiro

== Reception ==
On review aggregator Rotten Tomatoes, Love Exposure holds an approval rating of 91% based on 22 reviews, with an average rating of 7.74/10. The website's critical consensus reads: "An engagingly funny melodrama as well as an ambitious exploration of sexual behavior, Sion Sono's Love Exposure provides nearly four hours of extremely strange and entertaining cinema." On Metacritic, the film has a weighted average score of 78 out of 100 based on 11 reviews, indicating "generally favorable reviews".

Jaime Grijalba of Brooklyn Magazine wrote that "nothing can prepare anyone for the madness of this profound work of love, perversion, religion, friendship and conspiracies. It’s the most bombastic work of Japanese Cinema of the past decade and maybe the only four-hour film you can watch more than three times [...] in a year." In 2015, Jasper Sharp of the British Film Institute listed it as one of the 10 great Japanese films of the 21st century. Freelance film critic Kenji Fujishima also voted Love Exposure the ninth greatest film of the century in BBC's 2016 poll.

== Awards ==
The film received the following awards and nominations:

List of accolades
Award / Film festival	Category	Recipient(s)	Result
Berlin International Film Festival	Caligari Film Award	Sion Sono	Won
Berlin International Film Festival	FIPRESCI Prize	Sion Sono	Won
Fantasia Film Festival	Best Asian Film	Sion Sono	Won
Fantasia Film Festival	Jury Prize: Best Female Performance	Hikari Mitsushima	Won
Fantasia Film Festival	Most Innovative Film	Sion Sono	Won
Fantasia Film Festival	Special Jury Prize	Sion Sono	Won
New York Asian Film Festival	Grand Jury Prize	Sion Sono	Won
Barcelona Asian Film Festival	Audience Award	Sion Sono	Won
Bucheon International Fantastic Film Festival	Netpac Award (Special Mention)	Hikari Mitsushima; Sakura Ando	Won
Tokyo Filmex	Audience Award	Sion Sono	Won
Hochi Film Awards	Best New Talent	Hikari Mitsushima	Won
Kinema Junpo Awards	Best New Actor	Takahiro Nishijima	Won
Kinema Junpo Awards	Best Supporting Actress	Hikari Mitsushima	Won
Mainichi Film Concours	Best Director	Sion Sono	Won
Mainichi Film Concours	Sponichi Grand Prize: New Talent Award	Takahiro Nishijima; Hikari Mitsushima	Won
Yokohama Film Festival	Best New Talent	Hikari Mitsushima	Won
Yokohama Film Festival	Best Supporting Actress	Sakura Ando	Won
Asia Pacific Screen Awards	Achievement in Directing	Sion Sono	Nominated
Asian Film Awards	Best Director	Sion Sono	Nominated
