= Cocomi =

Japanese model

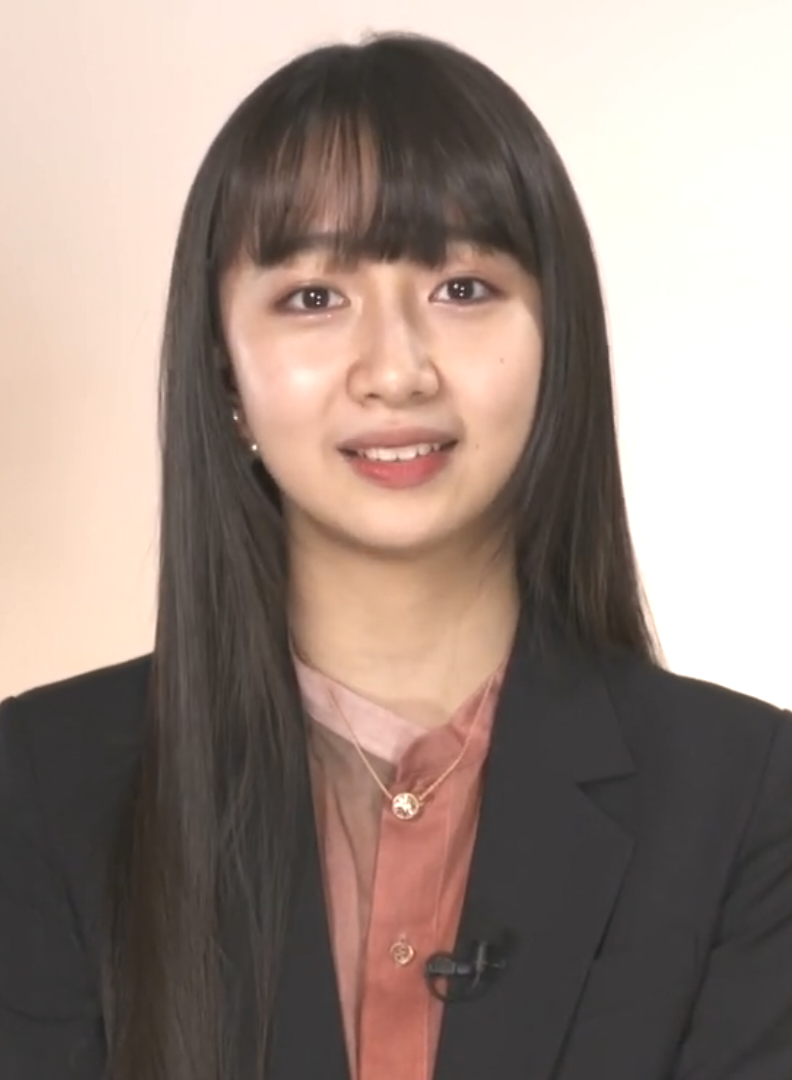
- Cocomi in 2021
- Born: Kokomi Kimura; May 1, 2001 (age 25); Tokyo, Japan
- Occupation: Model
- Years active: 2020–present
- Height: 157 cm (5 ft 2 in)
- Parents: Takuya Kimura (father); Shizuka Kudo (mother)
- Relatives: Mitsuki Kimura (sister)

Cocomi Kimura (Japanese: 木村 心美, Hepburn: Kimura Kokomi; born May 1, 2001), known professionally as Cocomi, is a Japanese model and flutist.

== Personal life ==
Cocomi Kimura was born on May 1, 2001, in Tokyo, Japan. She is the elder daughter of actor Takuya Kimura and singer Shizuka Kudo. Her younger sister, Kōki, is a model and songwriter. She speaks Japanese, French, and English. She has spoken fluent English since she was a child, having attended international schools (Aoba Japan International School and British School, Tokyo Showa). She started playing the violin at the age of three before switching to the flute at the age of eleven. She studied under Kanda Hiroaki, a professor at Toho Gakuen School of Music and principal flutist of the NHK Symphony Orchestra. She completed a masterclass under the tutelage of Vladimir Ashkenazy and Emmanuel Pahud.

She won in the Wind Instrument High School Division during the 2nd Japan Music Competition in Tokyo, though she could not attend the national competition.

In March 2020, she graduated from Toho Girls' High School, Department of Music. In April 2020, she started studying in Toho Gakuen School of Music (桐朋学園 音楽部門, Tōhō Gakuen Ongaku Bumon), a private music school in Chōfu, Tokyo, Japan.

== Career ==
In March 2020, Cocomi debuted as a model, appearing as a cover girl in the May 2020 issue of Vogue Japan. She is a beauty ambassador for Dior.

== Filmography ==
=== Film ===
Year	Film	Role	Notes	Ref.
2021	Fortune Favors Lady Nikuko	Kikuko (voice)		
2025	Kaitō Queen no Yūga na Kyūka	Ilma (voice)		

== Awards and accolades ==
Year	Award	Category	Result
2013	23rd Yamano Junior Flute Contest	Wind Instrument Division	Won
2019	2nd Japan Music Competition	Wind Instrument High School Division	Won
2019	French Modern Music Prize	Wind Instrument High School Division	1st Runner Up
