= Matsuko Deluxe =

Japanese columnist, essayist and TV personality

- マツコ・デラックス
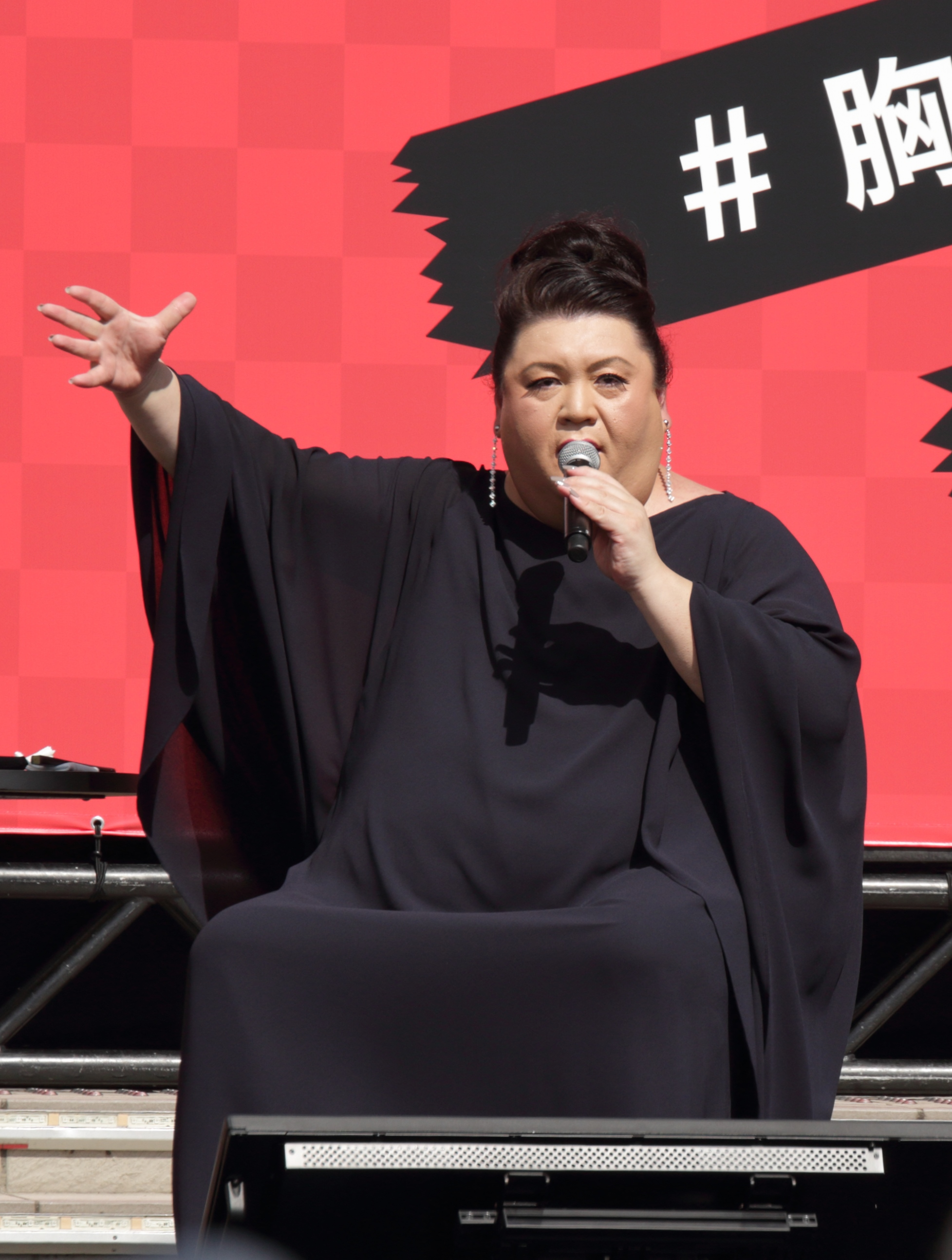
- Matsuko Deluxe
- Born: Takahiro Matsui (松井貴博); October 26, 1972 (age 53); Inage-ku, Chiba, Japan
- Other name: マツコ
- Occupation: TV personality
- Years active: 2002–present
- Agent: Natural Eight
- Website: https://naturaleight.co.jp/matsuko/

Matsuko Deluxe (マツコ・デラックス, Matsuko Derakkusu; born October 26, 1972) is a Japanese columnist, essayist, and TV personality. Matsuko is a female persona and stage name assumed by Takahiro Matsui (松井貴博), a cross-dressing gay man. He has been described as plus-sized and gravely-voiced with a sharp tongue.

== Before Matsuko Deluxe ==
Takahiro Matsui was born in Chiba Prefecture. He graduated from a beauty school and was training to be a beautician when, inspired by LGBT activists, he changed careers and became an editor and writer for the Japanese gay magazine Badi. He quit his job in his late twenties and began to live as a hikikomori.

== As Matsuko Deluxe ==
In 2000, the writer Usagi Nakamura, familiar with Matsuko's work as an editor and writer, selected Matsuko to be one of people to interview for his book about unconventional women. The book, published in 2001, names "Matsuko Deluxe" as an interview subject, introducing him as a "cross-dressing writer".

The television debut of Matsuko Deluxe came in 2000, on Fuji TV's late-night variety show Ebunai. In his 2005 book Shūkan josō ritānzu (週刊女装リターンズ, The Weekly Cross-Dresser Returns), Matsuko writes that in 2000 his bust/waist/hip measurements were 140 centimetres (55 in) each and his weight was 140 kilograms (310 lb). It was with this unique style as a large drag queen that he began rising in popularity as a talento and writer.

In 2013, Matsuko became part of an advertising campaign for Mister Donut's 10th anniversary of introducing the "Pon de Ring" donut, and has continued being the company's spokesperson through its recipe renewal and Calpis collaboration promotions.

As of 2022, Matsuko is a regular panelist and sometimes host on the Japanese talk shows Goji ni Muchū!, Honma Dekka!? TV, Shirushiru Mishiru, Matsuko & Ariyoshi's Karisome Tenkoku, Jinsei ga Kawaru Ippunkan no Fuka Ii Hanashi, Matsuko no Shiranai Sekai (The World Unknown to Matsuko), Arita & Matsuko & Man & Woman, and Monday Late Show, and also an often featured guest on the popular comedy Downtown no Gaki no Tsukai ya Arahende!!

== Controversies and views ==
In 2010, he became known for his "feud" with many of Japan's female television announcers over their perceived image.

In the same year, Matsuko was critical of then Tokyo Prefectural Governor Shintaro Ishihara's legislation to limit the sales of manga and anime to those under 18, as well as the governor's noted disdain of homosexuality and transvestitism.

In 2012, Matsuko participated in a debate on national pride of Chinese, Korean, and Japanese and when a Korean-Japanese guest claimed "Japanese entertainment is like field baseball, but Korean entertainment is like professional baseball", he replied that K-pop was "nothing but an imitation of American pop music". When a Korean-Japanese participant pointed out Lady Gaga's popularity in Japan was a sign of the weakness of J-pop, Matsuko responded that Japan had welcomed the music of many cultures, including Korean, and said that if K-pop artists did not like Japan the way it is then they did not have to stay. Matsuko's statements caused controversy on the Korean internet.
