= Kentaro Ito (actor, born 1997) =

Japanese actor and model (born 1997)

- Ito at a press event for Ride Your Wave in 2019
- Born: June 30, 1997 (age 29); Tokyo, Japan
- Other name: Kentaro
- Occupations: Actor; model
- Years active: 2012–present
- Agent: Tristone Entertainment
- Height: 179 cm (5 ft 10 in)

Japanese name
- Kanji: 伊藤 健太郎
- Hiragana: いとう けんたろう
Transcriptions
- Romanization: Itō Kentarō
- Website: golondrinas.net

Kentaro Ito (伊藤 健太郎, Itō Kentarō; born June 30, 1997) is a Japanese actor and model. Previously known mononymously as Kentaro, began his career as a model and transitioned into acting in 2014 with his acting debut in Fuji TV's Hirugao: Love Affairs in the Afternoon as Keita Kinoshita. He has since starred in multiple television dramas, such as Tokyo Love Story, Peanut Butter Sandwich, and Is This Love a Sin!?.

== Career ==
Ito began his career as a model, previously known simply as Kentaro, appearing mainly in magazines and advertisements. He made his acting debut in the afternoon television drama Hirugao: Love Affairs in the Afternoon, since then he has continuously appeared in many shows such as Gakkō no Kaidan, My Love Story!, Transit Girls, and as a former studio regular in Terrace House among others.

During the beginning of his acting career, Ito had been considering a stage surname for some time. When his character's name in the television drama From Today, It's Me!! was the same as his real surname, "Ito," he felt it was fate. On his 21st birthday, June 30, 2018, he announced that he would change his stage name to his full name, Kentaro Ito.

=== Rising popularity and temporary hiatus ===
In 2019, he appeared in the drama Scarlet as Takeshi, the son of Kimiko Kawahara portrayed by Erika Toda, marking his first appearance in NHK's morning drama series, Asadora.

On July 21, 2020, Ito was set to co-star with Ryusei Yokohama in the play Ganryujima; however, it was reported that Yokohama had contracted Covid, and the Tokyo stage performance was effectively canceled. Ito also took a PCR test, but it came back negative. However, as a close contact to Yokohama, he was asked to self-isolate at home for two weeks, until August 4, 2020.

On September 10 of the same year, he announced that he would be leaving Aoao Inc. and rejoin his former company, Image Entertainment.

On October 28, 2020, Ito was detained for a vehicular accident after he collided with a motorcycle while driving a passenger car and subsequently left the scene. He was later released and was not charged. He took a short break from his career after the accident due to receiving significant backlash for fleeing the scene.

=== 2022–present: Resumption of activities and restitution ===
On June 30, 2021, Ito launched his official website "GOLONDRINAS".

On May 15, 2022, he starred in the film Winter Rose. Set in a port town, he plays a young delinquent who later gets involved in uncovering the truth behind what happened to one of his friends who had been brutally attacked by an unknown assailant. The film was directed by Junji Sakamoto.

In May 2023, he played the lead role in the film The Quiet Don as Kondo Shizuka, the third leader of the Shinsengumi. In December of the same year, he appeared in the movie Till We Meet Again on the Lily Hill as the protagonist's best friend; for this role, he was nominated for the Best Supporting Actor award at the Japan Academy Award ceremony.

== Car accident and public image ==
On the night of October 28, 2020, Ito collided with a motorcycle while driving a passenger car, critically injuring a man and a woman. On the following day, the Metropolitan Police Department arrested him on suspicion of violating the Automobile Driving Punishment Act and the Road Traffic Act for leaving the scene of the accident.

Following the police reports, Ito's works and other television appearances were either removed, suspended or cancelled. He was removed from the cast of the NHK evening drama Ucchan that was scheduled to air in December 2020, and the on-demand streaming of his dramas was also suspended. Fuji TV replaced the programs scheduled to air from October 29 to 31. Ito's film Tonkatsu DJ Agetarō was released as scheduled on October 30, but his greeting appearance on the opening day was canceled. He was selected as the "Face of 2020" by the magazine Nikkei Trendy but was absent from the announcement held on November 3. Additionally, his appearance in the morning information program ZIP! was suspended from November 2020.

On March 25, 2021, in court hearings, the charges of negligent driving resulting in injury were dropped as a settlement was reached with the victims, and the charges of hit-and-run were not indicted due to insufficient evidence to prove criminal intent. Ito posted a handwritten apology on his social media account regarding the accident.

After dealing with the lawsuits, he faced much criticism from the public, as he had received no legal consequences for the act. Due to the hate, at one point, he considered retiring from acting.

== Filmography ==
=== Film ===
Year	Title	Role	Notes	Ref.
2015	My Love Story!!	Osamu Kurihara		
2016	Luna	Shunsuke	Short-film; Lead role	
2016	Museum	Hisashi Sawamura (teen)		
2016	14 Nights	Kaneda		
2017	Let's Go, Jets!	Hiroshi Yashiro		
2017	Sagrada Reset	Tomoki Nakano	Lead role	
2017	My Teacher	Yusuke Fujioka		
2017	Demekin	Masaki Sada	Lead role	
2018	Room Laundering	Akito Nijikawa		
2018	Before the Coffee Gets Cold	Ryosuke Shintani		
2018	Lock-On Love	Ritsu Niimi		
2018	We Love You	Kazuma Saeki		
2019	The Flowers of Evil	Takao Kasuga	Lead role	
2019	Ride Your Wave	Wasabi Kawamura (voice)		
2019	Shinkansen Henkei Robo Shinkalion	Nahane (voice)		
2020	Noboru Kodera-san	Kondo		
2020	Starting Today, It's My Turn!!	Shinji Ito		
2020	Yowamushi Pedal: Up the Road	Shunsuke Imaizumi		
2020	The Brightest Roof in the Universe	Toru Asakura		
2020	Tonkatsu DJ Agetaro	Yashiki Kurando		
2020	The Devil in a Twelve-Layered Robe: A Tale of Genji	Rai Ito	Lead role	
2022	Winter Rose	Jun Toguchi	Lead role	
2022	Welcome Home	Yudai Kato	Lead role; short-film	
2023	Shisu in Zagin!?		Lead role	
2023	Shizukanaru Don – Yakuza Side Story	Shizuka Kondo	Lead role	
2023	Till We Meet Again on the Lily Hill	Ishimaru		
2025	#Iwilltellyouthetruth	Kiriyama's friend		
2025	The Boy and the Dog	Tadashi Numaguchi		
2025	Strawberry Moon	Kenji Kawamura (adult)		
2026	The Ogre's Bride	Yota Kogetsu		
2026	Till We Meet Again on the Starry Hill	Ishimaru		

=== Television drama ===
Year	Title	Role	Notes	Ref.
2014	Hirugao: Love Affairs in the Afternoon	Keita Kinoshita		
2015	The Girl's Speech	Haru Senzaki		
2015	Matsumoto Seicho Suspense: Shadow Zone	Keisuke Tashiro		
2015	Transit Girls	Nao Fukuzawa		
2016	It's Not That I Can't Get Married, It's That I Won't	Yosuke Sakurai		
2016	Aogeba Totoshi	Hirotatsu Igawa		
2016	Cold Case: The Door to Truth	Tsutomu Arikawa	Episode 5	
2016	Good Morning Call	Sata Issei		
2017	Rental Love	Hayato Tachibana		
2017	Crime Syndrome	Tomoki Ichihara	Season 2	
2017	Slacker Office Worker Kantaro Ameya	Yutaka Takarabe	Episodes 4 & 11	
2017	Ashi-Girl	Tadakiyo Hagikuhachirō	Lead role	
2018	AIBOU: Tokyo Detective Duo	Kamijo Takaki	Episodes 10 & 16	
2018	BG Personal Bodyguard	Takashi Shinkawa		
2018	Lock-On Love	Ritsu Niimi		
2018	From Today, It's My Turn!!!	Shinji Ito		
2018	Room Laundering	Akito Nijikawa		
2018	Is This Love a Sin!?	Taiga Kohinata	Lead role	
2018	Life!: A comedy dedicated to life	Kazuma		
2019	Life! Presents Shinobi! Uzaemon: The Sky Attack	Kazuma	Semi-regular cast member	
2019	Hissatsu Shigotonin	Yayoshi/ Ebisawa Kichiemon		
2019	Everyone's Paralympics: Memories of 1964			
2020	Kyojo 2	Cameo		(Note: Kentaro Ito only appears in one scene at the end of the second part of Kyojo. After Ito was involved in a scandal in October 2020, Daiki Shigeoka took his place in Kyojo II. For this reason, Ito's scenes were not broadcast in the special edited version broadcast in December.)
2020	Scarlet	Takeshi Kawahara	Asadora	
2020	Five Hells "The Woman Who Clings"	Makoto Tazaki		
2020	Peanut Butter Sandwich	Ren Kobayashi	Lead role	
2020	Women Document Detectives	Reiichi Karakita	Season 2; Episode 3	
2020	Doting Parents	Cameo	Episode 5	
2020	Suits	Shingo Satake	Season 2; Episode 11	
2021	Tokyo Love Story	Kanji Nagao	Lead role	
2022	Pension Metza		Episode 4	
2024	The Guys Who Illuminate the Streets	Koichi Omura		
2024	Dear Radiance	Sōjumaru	Taiga drama	
2025	Unloved: Hidden Loners	Kento Takasaka	Lead role	
2025	If She Calls It Love	Komori Hisame		
2026	Water Margin	Wu Song		
2026	Marriage by Robbery	Tsukasa		
2026	102nd Proposal	Otsuki Oto		
2026	100 Days Until We Break Up	Yuma Kasuga	Lead role	
2026	The Consultant: The Man Who Writes About Death	Yo Izaki	Lead role	
2026	Brothers in Arms	Ishikawa Seibei	Taiga drama	

== Awards and nominations ==
Year presented, name of the award ceremony, category, nominee(s) of the award, and the result of the nomination
Year	Award ceremony	Category	Nominated work(s)	Result	Ref.
2019	42nd Japan Academy Film Prize	Newcomer of the Year	Before the Coffee Gets Cold	Won	
2019	Forbes Japan 30 UNDER 30	Montblanc Special Award	Himself	Won	
2020	Nikkei Trendy	2020 Face of the Year	Himself	Won	
2024	47th Japan Academy Film Prize	Best Supporting Actor	Till We Meet Again on the Lily Hill	Nominated	
