= Yui Sakuma =

Japanese model and actress (born 1995)

- 佐久間 由衣
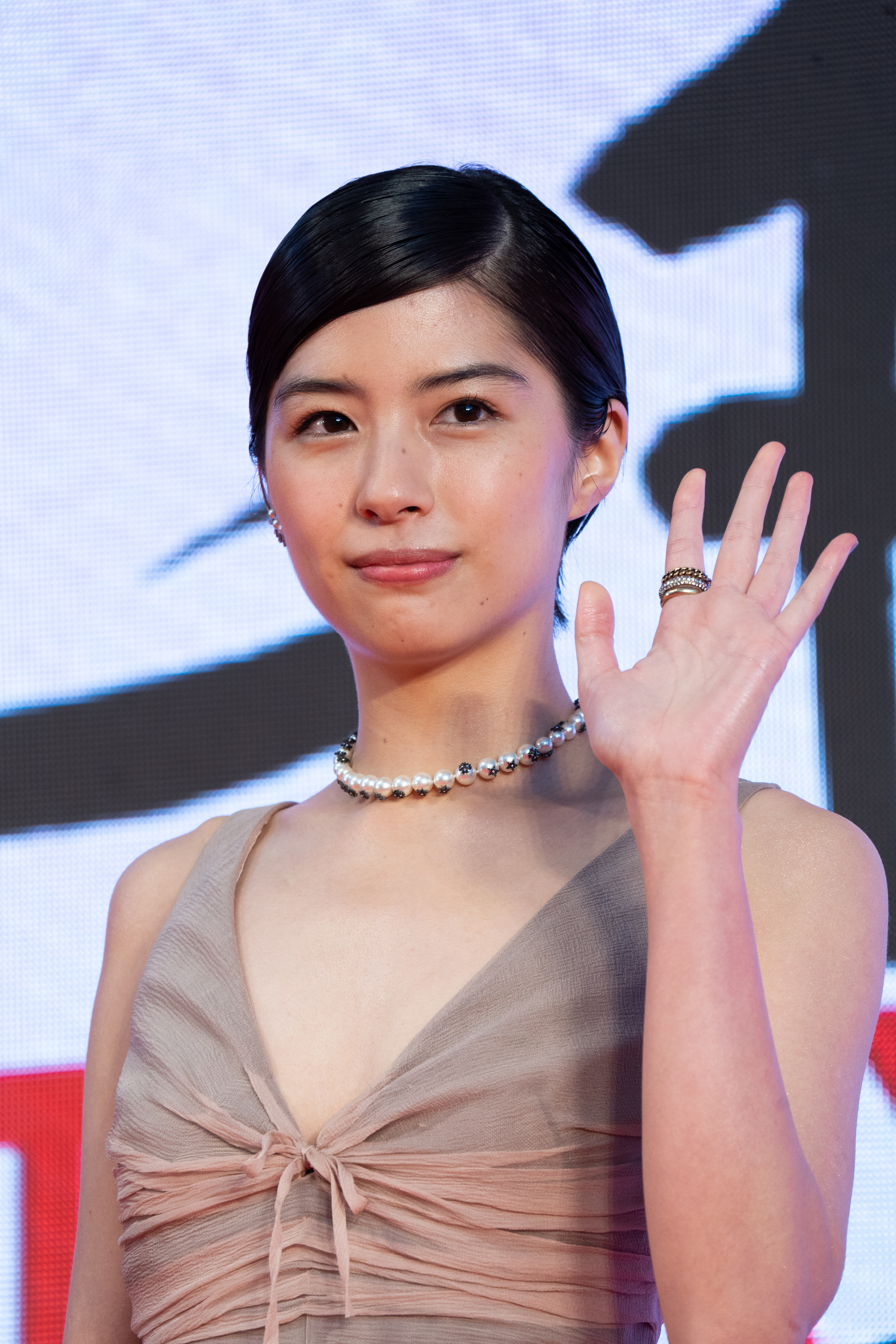
- Sakuma at Tokyo International Film Festival in 2019
- Born: March 10, 1995 (age 31); Yokosuka, Kanagawa Prefecture, Japan
- Occupations: Model; actress
- Years active: 2013–present
- Agent: Platinum Production
- Height: 170 cm (5 ft 7 in)
- Spouse: Go Ayano (m. 2022)
- Children: 1

Yui Sakuma (佐久間 由衣, Sakuma Yui; born March 10, 1995) is a Japanese actress and model. Her acting roles have included Tokiko Sukegawa in the 96th NHK asadora Hiyokko and Yui Shida in the Fuji TV series Transit Girls.

== Early life ==
Sakuma was born in Yokosuka City, Kanagawa Prefecture on March 10, 1995. She is the eldest of three siblings with a younger brother and sister.

== Career ==
In 2013, Sakuma auditioned as an exclusive model for the fashion magazine Vivi. She won the Girls Award '13A/W on September 28 of the same year, and first appeared on Vivi's December 2013 issue. She made her acting debut with Tao Tsuchiya in the 2014 film Jinrō Game Beast Side. She later starred in the 2015 Fuji Television drama Transit Girls. In 2017 she played the role of Tokiko Sukegawa in the 96th NHK asadora Hiyokko.

== Personal life ==
Within the entertainment industry she is good friends with fellow actresses Anna Ishii and Sairi Ito.

=== Marriage ===
On December 31, 2022, Sakuma announced that she and actor Go Ayano, who is thirteen years her senior, had officially registered their marriage. On March 30, 2024, Sakuma and Ayano announced that they had welcomed the birth of their first child.

== Filmography ==
=== Magazines ===
Year	Title	Notes	Ref.
2013	Vivi	Exclusive model	

=== Films ===
Year	Title	Role	Notes	Ref.
2014	Jinrō Game Beast Side	Hitomi Tsushima		
2019	The Day's Organ	Yoshiko Kanda		
2019	I Was a Secret Bitch	Hiromi	Lead role	
2019	Brave Father Online: Our Story of Final Fantasy XIV	Satomi Ide		
2019	Murders at the House of Death	Sumie Nabari		
2020	Eternally Younger Than Those Idiots	Sayo Horigai	Lead role	
2021	The Road to Murder: The Movie	Yuzuki		
2023	Call Me Chihiro	Hitomi		
2023	Kingdom 3: The Flame of Destiny	Hai Yin		
2024	Kingdom 4: Return of the Great General	Hai Yin		
2026	Kingdom 5: The Clash of Souls	Hai Yin		

=== TV series ===
Year	Title	Role	Notes	Ref.
2015	Transit Girls	Yui Shida	Lead role	
2017	Hiyokko	Tokiko Sukegawa	Asadora	
2017	Tomorrow's Promise	Kasumi Shirai		
2018	We Are Rockets!	Asako Sakurazawa		
2018	Signal	Midori Kitano		
2020	The Road to Murder	Yuzuki	Miniseries	
2021	Bullets, Bones and Blocked Noses	Mila Sekine	Miniseries	
2022	Umeko: The Face of Female Education	Nagai Shige	Television film	
2022	Hiru	Robo	Season 2	
2022	Love with a Case	Nagisa Hattori		
2023	Ranman	Aya Makino	Asadora	

=== Advertisements ===
Year	Title	Notes	Ref.
2014	Coca-Cola 2014 FIFA World Cup		

== Awards and nominations ==
Year	Award-giving body	Category	Nominated work(s)	Result	Ref(s)
2019	Elle Cinema Awards 2019	ElleGirl Rising Star	I Was a Secret Bitch and others	Won	
2020	74th Mainichi Film Awards	Best New Actress	I Was a Secret Bitch	Nominated	
