= Scarlet (TV series) =

Japanese television series

- Original title: スカーレット
- Genre: Drama
- Written by: Fumie Mizuhashi
- Directed by: Yuki Nakajima; Yuzuru Satō; Kō Suzuki; Takayoshi Ōtani; Takamasa Izunami; Yūsuke Noda
- Starring: Erika Toda; Yasuko Tomita; Kouhei Matsushita; Kentarō Itō; Yuko Oshima; Kento Hayashi; Nanami Sakuraba; Mayuko Fukuda; Junpei Mizobata; Magy; Ryuta Sato; Naomi Zaizen; Miki Mizuno; Issey Ogata; Goro Inagaki; Kazuki Kitamura
- Narrated by: Seiko Nakajō
- Opening theme: "Flare" by Superfly
- Composer: Yumi Tōno
- Country of origin: Japan
- Original language: Japanese
- No. of episodes: 156

Production
- Executive producer: Yuki Uchida
- Producers: Tomoki Hase; Yuya Kasai
- Running time: 15 minutes
- Production company: NHK Osaka

Original release
- Network: NHK
- Release: September 30, 2019 – March 28, 2020

Scarlet (スカーレット, Sukāretto) is a Japanese television drama series and the 101st Asadora series, following Natsuzora. It premiered on September 30, 2019, and concluded on March 28, 2020.

== Plot ==
This asadora follows the life and career of Kimiko Kawahara (played as an adult by Erika Toda) pioneering the way for women in the male-dominated field of ceramics in Japan after World War II. The story centres around Shiga Prefecture and the pottery town of Shigaraki.

In 1947, 9-year-old Kimiko (played as a child by Yukawa Kawashima) came to Shigaraki from Osaka with her father Joji (played by Kazuki Kitamura), mother Matsu (played by Yasuko Tomita), and two sisters. Joji was fleeing from debt collectors due to a business failure as a result of the war. As they settle into life in rural Shiga, Kimiko, who is very curious, is inspired by the pottery work in Shigaraki. However, initially Kimiko goes to school, takes care of her sisters and helps her mother with the housework. Joji found work in the transport industry, but the Kawahara family was still poor. Because of this, Joji brings a young man named Soichiro Kusama (played by Ryuta Sato) to board in the household. Kimiko finds inspiration from Kusama, who in turn praises her drawing work.

Eventually, the debt collectors trace Joji to Shigaraki...

As an adult, Kimiko marries another ceramicist and has one son (that later died of leukemia) but continues to pursue her dreams of working in ceramics and seeks to create her own unique style.

== Cast ==
=== Kawahara's family ===
- Erika Toda as Kimiko Kawahara
  - Yua Kawashima as young Kimiko
- Kazuki Kitamura as Jōji Kawahara, Kimiko's father
- Yasuko Tomita as Matsu Kawahara, Kimiko's mother
- Nanami Sakuraba as Naoko Kawahara, Kimiko's sister
  - Natsumi Yakuwa as young Naoko
- Mayuko Fukuda as Yuriko Kawahara, Kimiko's younger sister

=== Shigaraki people ===
- Yūko Oshima as Teruko Kumagai, Kimiko's childhood friend
  - Naho Yokomizo as young Teruko
- Kento Hayashi as Shinsaku Ōno, Kimiko's childhood friend
  - Kenshin Nakamura, as young Shinsaku
- Naomi Zaizen as Yōko Ōno, Shinsaku's mother
- Magy as Takenobu Ōno, Shinsaku's father and store owner

=== Osaka people ===
- Miki Mizuno as Chiyaki Andō, a journalist
- Junpei Mizobata as Keisuke Sakata
- Takehiro Kimoto as Yutarō Tanaka
- Aki Hano as Sada Araki, a mistress and designer
- Kyōko Mitsubayashi as Nobuko Ōkubo, a former maid of Araki's mansion
- Takanori Nishikawa as George Fujikawa, a world-renowned artist

=== Others ===
- Ryuta Satō as Sōichirō Kusama
- Kouhei Matsushita as Hachirō Soyoda
- Issey Ogata as Shinsen Fukano
- Kentaro Ito as Takeshi Kawahara, Kimiko's son
- Goro Inagaki as Dr. Shigeyoshi Ōsaki
- Ruka Matsuda as Mana Ishii

Preceded by Natsuzora	Asadora; September 30, 2019 – March 28, 2020	Succeeded by Yell
