= Akira Oze =

Japanese manga artist

- Born: 26 July 1947 (age 79) Kyoto, Japan
- Area: Manga artist
- Notable works: Natsuko no Sake; Hatsukoi Scandal; Tobe! Jinrui II
- Awards: 31st Shogakukan Manga Award for shōnen manga - Hatsukoi Scandal and Tobe! Jinrui II

Akira Oze (尾瀬あきら, Oze Akira; born 26 July 1947 in Kyoto, Japan) is a Japanese manga artist. He made his debut in 1971 under the pen name Megumu Matsumoto (松本めぐむ) writing shōnen manga, but he switched in the 1980s to seinen manga. He is best known for Natsuko no Sake, which was adapted as a live-action television series. Oze won the 1986 Shogakukan Manga Award for shōnen manga for Hatsukoi Scandal and Tobe! Jinrui II.

== Selected works ==
- Tobe! Jinrui (とべ!人類) (1978, 1 volume)
- Hatsukoi Scandal (初恋スキャンダル) (1981–1986, 18 volumes)
- Ryū (リュウ) (1986–1987, 7 volumes) – story by Masao Yajima
- Natsuko no Sake (夏子の酒) (1988–1991, 12 volumes)
- The Story of My Village (ぼくの村の話, Boku no Mura no Hanashi) (1992–1994, 7 volumes)
- The Legend of Minori (みのり伝説, Minori Densetsu) (1994–1997, 9 volumes)
- Island of Light (光の島) (2001–2004, 8 volumes)
