= Hiyokko =

Japanese TV series

- Promotional poster
- Original title: ひよっこ
- Genre: Drama
- Written by: Yoshikazu Okada
- Directed by: Hiroshi Kurosaki; Tadashi Tanaka; Takeshi Fukuoka
- Starring: Kasumi Arimura; Ikki Sawamura; Yoshino Kimura; Kazunobu Mineta; Michiko Hada; Rie Shibata; Hitomi Satō; Yui Sakuma; Yūki Izumisawa; Satoru Matsuo; Kanji Tsuda; Ichirō Yatsui; Hayato Isomura; Emi Wakui; Kuranosuke Sasaki; Ikkō Furuya; Nobuko Miyamoto
- Narrated by: Akemi Masuda
- Opening theme: "Wakai Hiroba" by Keisuke Kuwata
- Composer: Akira Miyagawa
- Country of origin: Japan
- Original language: Japanese
- No. of episodes: 156

Production
- Producer: Hiroshi Kashi
- Running time: 15 minutes
- Production company: NHK

Original release
- Network: NHK
- Release: April 3 – September 30, 2017

Related
- Hiyyoko 2 (Special drama)

Hiyokko (ひよっこ) is a Japanese television drama series and the 96th asadora series, following Beppinsan. It was premiered on April 3, 2017, and ended on September 30, 2017.

== Plot ==
Mineko Yatabe is a teenager living in a very rural area of Ibaraki Prefecture in 1964, the year of the Tokyo Olympics. Her father, Minoru, is a farmer, and often goes to Tokyo to do extra work for the family. This time, however, he goes missing. Mineko travels to Tokyo to find him, and begins to work at a small electronics factory while continuing her search. She makes many friends there, but the factory goes bankrupt and she is left unemployed. Luckily, she is hired by Suzuko Makino as a waitress at her restaurant, the Suzufuri-tei, which happened to be her father's favorite eatery. She lives at the boarding house next door, in which live a variety of people, from manga artists to college students. Mineko falls in love with a college student, Junichirō Shimatani, but they part when his father forces him to marry to save the family business. Mineko becomes friends with the movie star, Setsuko Kawamoto, who after learning of Mineko's father, reveals that Minoru has been living in her apartment all along. He lost his memory in a fight and Setsuko took him in. Mineko returns Minoru to his family in Ibaraki. Mineko then falls in love with Hidetoshi Maeda, one of the junior chefs at the Suzufuri-tei. She also helps Setsuko, when Setsuko needs to flee from the press after her aunt and uncle misappropriated her money.

== Cast ==
=== Main character ===
- Kasumi Arimura as Mineko Yatabe

=== Oku-Ibaraki village ===
==== Yatabe family ====
- Ikkō Furuya as Shigeru Yatabe, Mineko's grandfather
- Ikki Sawamura as Minoru Yatabe, Mineko's father
- Yoshino Kimura as Miyoko Yatabe, Mineko's mother
- Kanau Miyahara as Chiyoko Yatabe, Mineko's sister
- Rai Takahashi as Susumu Yatabe, Mineko's brother
- Kazunobu Mineta as Muneo Koiwai, Mineko's uncle
- Shizuyo Yamasaki as Shigeko Koiwai, Muneo's wife and Mineko's aunt

==== Sukegawa family ====
- Yui Sakuma as Tokiko Sukegawa, Mineko's childhood friend and classmate
- Michiko Hada as Kimiko Sukegawa, Tokiko's mother
- Toshiya Tōyama as Shōji Sukegawa, Tokiko's father
- Kento Shibuya as Toyosaku Sukegawa, Tokiko's brother

==== Sumitani family ====
- Yūki Izumisawa as Mitsuo Sumitani, Mineko's childhood friend and classmate
- Rie Shibata as Kiyo Sumitani, Mitsuo's mother
- Shinji Asakura as Masao Sumitani, Mitsuo's father
- Hiroyuki Onoue as Tarō Sumitani, Mitsuo's brother

==== Others ====
- Satoru Matsuo as Jirō Mashiko, a school bus conductor
- Kanji Tsuda as Manabu Tagami, a high school teacher

=== Tokyo people ===
==== Suzufuri-tei ====
- Nobuko Miyamoto as Suzuko Makino, the shop owner
- Kuranosuke Sasaki as Shōgo Makino, the chef
- Hitomi Satō as Takako Asakura, the hall clerk
- Ichiro Yatsui as Kenji Igawa
- Hayato Isomura as Hidetoshi Maeda

==== Mukoujima Radio Factory ====
- Emi Wakui as Aiko Nagai
- Fujiko Kojima as Sachiko Akiba
- Yūki Yagi as Yūko Natsui
- Honoka Matsumoto as Sumiko Nabatame
- Ryōko Fujino as Toyoko Kanehira

=== Others ===
- Ryo Ryusei as Masayoshi Watahiki
- Kayoko Shiraishi as Tomi Tachibana
- Ryoma Takeuchi as Junichirō Shimatani
- Kavka Shishido as Sanae Kusaka
- Koudai Asaka as Yūji Tsubouchi
- Amane Okayama as Keisuke Nitta
- Yūji Miyake as Ichirō Kashiwagi
- Ken Mitsuishi as Gorō Fukuda
- Tomoko Ikuta as Yasue Fukuda
- Miho Shiraishi as Kuniko Takeuchi
- Yūtaro Furutachi as Yasuharu Kashiwagi
- Satoru Saitou as Zenzou Abe
- Sairi Ito as Saori Abe
- Haruka Shimazaki as Yuka Makino
- Miho Kanno as Setsuko Kawamoto
- Kai Inowaki as Yudai Takashima

== Reception ==
The series was a ratings success, averaging 20.4% over the length of the series, with ratings improving as the show progressed.

Preceded by Beppin-san	Asadora; April 3, 2017 – September 30, 2017	Succeeded by Warotenka
