= Masato Hagiwara =

Japanese actor, voice actor, narrator and professional mahjong player

- 萩原 聖人
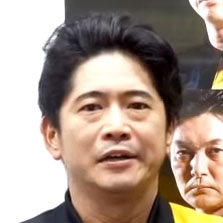
- Hagiwara in 2019
- Born: August 21, 1971 (age 54); Chigasaki, Kanagawa, Japan
- Occupations: Actor, voice actor, mahjong player
- Years active: 1987–present
- Agent: ALPHA AGENCY
- Spouse: Emi Wakui (m. 1995; div. 2003)
- Children: 1
- Website: www.alpha-agency.com/artist/hagiwara.html

Masato Hagiwara (萩原 聖人, Hagiwara Masato; born August 21, 1971) is a Japanese actor, voice actor, narrator and professional mahjong player.

== Biography ==
=== Early life and education ===
When Hagiwara was three years old, his parents divorced and he was taken in by his father. However, his father died when he was in the fourth grade, and was then raised by his paternal grandparents in Chigasaki until he was 15 years old. As a result, he spent most of his younger life without his mother.

After graduating from Chigasaki Shiritsu Umeda Junior High School, Hagiwara moved to Tokyo. He enrolled in the part-time program at Tokyo Metropolitan Toyama High School, but dropped out after only one week. Later on, he went to the United States for a short period of time and was impressed by the movie audiences he saw in New York City, which led him to become interested in acting as a career. After returning to Japan, when he was helping out at his mother's bar in Shinjuku, he caught the eye of the casting staff for the TV drama Abunai Deka who had come in as customers, and was recruited. Then, in 1987, he made his debut as a young luggage thief in episode 32 of Abunai Deka. He continued to appear in many films as a minor role, but it was his role as Naojirō Matsuoka in the 1990 TV drama High School Rakugaki 2 that brought him to prominence.

In 1991, he formed the theater group "Early Timelies" with Shōgo Suzuki, Kō Watanabe and Tetsu Sakuma. They performed six shows over a period of seven years. He later established a fanclub in 1993, which disbanded three years later in July 1996.

=== Legal issues ===
In 1993, one of the suspects in an assault case at Chūō-Rinkan Station on the Odakyu Line was accused of resembling Hagiwara. Hagiwara claimed to have an alibi, saying that he was meeting someone at the time of the crime, but refused to reveal the name of the person who could prove it, because it would be a nuisance to the person. This case damaged Hagiwara's public and private life, and for a while his appearances in dramas and other events were drastically reduced. Later, however, the case was dismissed on the grounds that the accuser's testimony contained many inconsistencies and it was just an accusation that Hagiwara resembled the killer.

== Career ==
Hagiwara co-starred in Kiyoshi Kurosawa's Cure with Kōji Yakusho and appeared in Hou Hsiao-hsien's Café Lumière. He was supposed to perform in the play "Shinjō Afururu Keihakusa 2001" at Theatre Cocoon in January 2001, but was forced to cancel his performance in December 2000 due to a sensorineural hearing loss that left him temporarily deaf.

He also had a starring role as a vocalist and saxophonist in a jazz band in Junji Sakamoto's Out of This World. After having saxophone lessons with others, he practiced by himself in a karaoke box until his lips were swollen. The second prominent time as a vocalist was in 2007 for the cover of a song by The Blue Hearts, Mirai wa Bokura no Te no Naka, which was used as an opening theme for the anime TV series Kaiji: Ultimate Survivor.

In 2018, he became a Riichi Mahjong professional affiliated with the Japan Professional Mahjong League. In the same year he was drafted by the Team RAIDEN professional Mahjong team for the participation of the team Riichi Mahjong tournament M-League.

== Personal life ==
In November 1995, Hagiwara married actress Emi Wakui, with whom he co-starred in the TV drama Natsuko no Sake. They had a son in October 1999 and divorced in July 2003, with Wakui taking custody of the son.

== Filmography ==
=== Film ===
| Year | Title | Role | Notes | Ref. |
|---|---|---|---|---|
| 1987 | Bu Su | Student | | |
| 1992 | The River with No Bridge | Sadao Shimura | | |
| 1993 | A Class to Remember | Kazu | | |
| 1993 | All Under the Moon | Office worker | | |
| 1994 | Tropical Paradise Club | Hayashi Toda | | |
| 1995 | Marks | Hiroyuki Mizusawa | Lead role | |
| 1995 | Shiratori Reiko de Gozaimasu! | Tetsuya Akimoto | | |
| 1997 | Cure | Kunihiko Mamiya | | |
| 1997 | Sharan Q no enka no hanamichi | AD Kita | | |
| 2000 | Chaos | Gorō Kuroda | Lead role | |
| 2001 | Onmyoji | Prince Sawara Shinno | | |
| 2001 | Go | Policeman | | |
| 2001 | Rain of Light | Mitsuya Anami | | |
| 2004 | Out of This World | Kentarō Hirooka | Lead role | |
| 2004 | Café Lumière | Seiji | | |
| 2004 | Akihabara@Deep | Naoki Tousaka | | |
| 2005 | Rikidōzan | Yuzuru Yoshimachi | | |
| 2007 | Battery | Makoto Tomura | | |
| 2008 | Chameleon | Satoshi Kashiwara | | |
| 2008 | Persona | Kōichirō Kiba | | |
| 2009 | Sanpei the Fisher Boy | Pei Mihira | | |
| 2009 | Listen to My Heart | Daisuke Goto | | |
| 2010 | BOX: The Hakamada Case | Norimichi Kumamoto | Lead role | |
| 2010 | Soup Opera | Mizutani | | |
| 2013 | Platinum Data | Shōgo Kagura | | |
| 2014 | Kamen Teacher | Nobuhiko Midō | | |
| 2015 | The Lion Standing in the Wind | Katsuhiko Aoki | | |
| 2017 | Miracles of the Namiya General Store | Takayuki Namiya | | |
| 2018 | And Your Bird Can Sing | Shimada | | |
| 2018 | A Banana? At This Time of Night? | Daisuke Takamura | | |
| 2019 | Happy Island | | | |
| 2019 | Silent Rain | | | |
| 2019 | Japanese Doll of Terror | | | |
| 2019 | And Live Goes On | Masayuki Sakamoto | | |
| 2020 | Fukushima 50 | | | |
| 2020 | Utahime Obaka Miiko | Haru Namidame | | |
| 2021 | Unlock Your Heart | Takashi Nishimura | | |
| 2021 | We Couldn't Become Adults | Hideaki Miyoshi | | |
| 2022 | Even If This Love Disappears From the World Tonight | Yukihiko Kamiya | | |
| 2022 | Shimamori | Akira Shimada | Lead role | |
| 2022 | Amnesiac Love | Kunio | | |
| 2023 | Eternal New Mornings | | | |
| 2023 | From Spice with Love | | | |
| 2023 | Insomniacs After School | Ganta's father | | |
| 2024 | Cross My Mind | | Lead role | |
| 2024 | Silence of the Sea | | | |
| 2024 | Hell Is Other People | | | |
| 2025 | Nagasaki: In the Shadow of the Flash | | | |
| 2025 | Hello, My Friend | | | |
| 2025 | By 6 A.M. | | | |
| 2025 | One Last Throw | Shuta Tanaka | | |
| 2026 | The Last Song You Left Behind | Masafumi Okuda | | |
| 2026 | 2126, Looking for the Sea's Star | | | |
| 2026 | Tsuki no Inu | | Lead role | |
| 2026 | Period | | | |
| 2026 | Hoshi no Kyoshitsu | | | |
| 2027 | San Juan no Ki | Yasuo Kazuki | Lead role | |

=== Television ===
| Year | Title | Role | Notes | Ref. |
|---|---|---|---|---|
| 1989 | High School Rakugaki 2 | Naojirō Matsuoka | | |
| 1994 | Natsuko no Sake | Wataru Kusakabe | | |
| 1994 | Wakamono no Subete | Tetsuo Harashima | Lead role | |
| 1997 | Sore ga Kotae da! | Kunio Ikeda | | |
| 2007 | Gō | Ishida Mitsunari | Taiga drama | |
| 2008 | Full Swing | Ikkyū Abe | | |
| 2011 | Diplomat Kosaku Kuroda | Keiichi Yūki | | |
| 2011 | The Reason I Can't Find My Love | Takumi Shiraishi | | |
| 2015 | Shingari | Takimoto | | |
| 2016 | Kyoaku wa Nemurasenai | Tetsuo Igarashi | Television film | |
| 2017 | Miotsukushi Ryōrichō | Mataji | | |
| 2017 | Ishitsubute | Masayuki Azumata | | |
| 2018 | When a Tree Falls | Michihiro Adachi | Television film | |
| 2019 | And Life Goes On | Masayuki Sakamoto | Television film | |
| 2019 | Trace: Kasōken no Otoko | Naofumi Hayakawa | Eps. 6-11 | |
| 2022 | Tokyo Vice | Duke | American television series | |
| 2023 | The Child of God Murmurs | | Television film | |
| 2024 | Golden Kamuy: The Hunt of Prisoners in Hokkaido | Kazuo Henmi | Episode 2 | |
| 2026 | Water Margin | Wang Lun | | |

=== Animated television series ===
| Year | Title | Role | Notes | Ref. |
|---|---|---|---|---|
| 2004 | Kappa no Kaikata | Watashi | | |
| 2005 | Akagi | Shigeru Akagi | | |
| 2007 | Kaiji: Ultimate Survivor | Kaiji Itō | | |
| 2008 | Examurai | ATSUSHI | | |
| 2008 | Lupin III: Sweet Lost Night | Adam | | |
| 2008 | One Outs | Tōa Tokuchi | | |
| 2009 | Winter Sonata | Lee Min-hyung / Kang Joon-sang | | |
| 2011 | Wolverine | Kikyō Mikage | | |
| 2011 | Kaiji: Against All Rules | Kaiji Itō | | |
| 2011 | Blade | Kikyō Mikage | | |
| 2018 | Mr. Tonegawa: Middle Management Blues | Kaiji Itō, Watanabe | | |

=== Animated films ===
| Year | Title | Role | Notes | Ref. |
|---|---|---|---|---|
| 2004 | The Place Promised in Our Early Days | Takuya Shirakawa | | |
| 2016 | Garo: Divine Flame | Dario Montoya | | |

=== Dubbing ===
Live-action

| Year | Title | Role | Voice dub for | Notes | Ref. |
|---|---|---|---|---|---|
| 2003 | Winter Sonata | Lee Min-hyung / Kang Joon-sang | Bae Yong-joon | | |
| 2003 | Untold Scandal | Jo-won | Bae Yong-joon | | |
| 2005 | First Love | Sung Chan-woo | Bae Yong-joon | | |
| 2005 | April Snow | In-su | Bae Yong-joon | | |
| 2006 | Charlie Jade | 01 Boxer | Michael Filipowich | | |
| 2008 | The Legend | Damdeok / Hwanung | Bae Yong-joon | | |
| 2011 | Dream High | Jung Ha-myung | Bae Yong-joon | | |
| 2018 | Burning | Ben | Steven Yeun | NHK edition | |

Animation

| Year | Title | Role | Notes | Ref. |
|---|---|---|---|---|
| 1999 | G-Saviour | Mark Curran | | |

=== Music videos ===
| Year | Song | Artist | Notes | Ref. |
|---|---|---|---|---|
| 2005 | Sakura | Ketsumeishi | | |

== Awards and nominations ==
| Year | Award | Category | Work(s) | Result | Ref. |
|---|---|---|---|---|---|
| 1993 | 6th Nikkan Sports Film Awards | Best Newcomer | A Class to Remember and Many Happy Returns | Won | |
| 1994 | 18th Elan d'or Awards | Newcomer of the Year | Himself | Won | |
| 1994 | 15th Yokohama Film Festival | Best Supporting Actor | A Class to Remember, Many Happy Returns and All Under the Moon | Won | |
| 1994 | 17th Japan Academy Film Prize | Newcomer of the Year | A Class to Remember, Many Happy Returns and All Under the Moon | Won | |
| 1996 | 38th Blue Ribbon Awards | Best Supporting Actor | Marks | Won | |
| 1996 | 19th Japan Academy Film Prize | Best Supporting Actor | Marks | Nominated | |
| 1998 | 21st Japan Academy Film Prize | Best Supporting Actor | Cure | Nominated | |
