= Seaside Serendipity =

2025 Japanese film

- Festival release poster
- Japanese: 海辺へ行く道
- Literally: The road to the seaside
- Directed by: Satoko Yokohama
- Written by: Satoko Yokohama
- Based on: 海辺へ行く道 Manga by Gin Miyoshi
- Produced by: Daisuke Wada
- Starring: Kōnosuke Harada; Kumiko Aso; Kengo Kora; Erika Karata
- Cinematography: Yuta Tsukinaga
- Edited by: Keiko Okawa
- Music by: Zo Zhit
- Production companies: Asako Nakano; Masayoshi Jonai
- Distributed by: Tokyo Theatre
- Release dates: 17 February 2025 (Berlinale); 29 August 2025 (Japan)
- Running time: 140 minutes
- Country: Japan
- Language: Japanese

Seaside Serendipity (Japanese: 海辺へ行く道) is a 2025 drama film for children, written and directed by Satoko Yokohama. The film based on a manga by Gin Miyoshi that depicts a coastal town which attracts artists who involve children and adults in their mysterious activities.

The film was selected in the Generation Kplus section at the 75th Berlin International Film Festival, where it had its World premiere on 17 February and competed for the Grand Prix of the International Jury for the Best Film.

== Synopsis ==
In a coastal town attracting artists, 14-year-old Sosuke and his friends stay busy painting and helping with school projects. As carefree children interact with secret-laden adults, the sunlit ocean reflects their contrasting struggles—kids embracing challenges while adults seek elusive answers.

== Cast ==
- Kōnosuke Harada as Sosuke Minami
- Kumiko Aso as Sumiko Minami
- Kengo Kora as Takaoka
- Erika Karata as Yoko
- Koharu Sugawara as Meg
- Ayame Goriki as Risako
- Shun Aoi as Teruo Nashimoto
- Toma Nakasu as Ryoichi Tachibana
- Nanami Yamazaki as Honoka Hirai
- Chise Niitsu as Kana Nashimoto
- Nobuhiro Suwa as Mr. A
- Jun Murakami as Ken
- Kankurō Kudō as Goro
- Maki Sakai as Shizuka

== Release ==
Seaside Serendipity had its world premiere on 17 February 2025, as part of the 75th Berlin International Film Festival, in Generation Kplus.

The film also participated in the Setouchi International Art Festival 2025, one of Japan's largest art festivals held once every three years and marking its sixth installment; in 2025 it was held from April 18 to May 25. The film was showcased as a contemporary art piece at the art festival. This marked the first time the festival had included a film in its lineup.

On 16 October 2025 it was presented in the International Perspective section of the São Paulo International Film Festival.

Seaside Serendipity was presented in the 'Country Focus: Japan - 2025' section of the 56th International Film Festival of India in November 2025.

The film was released nationwide in Japan on 29 August 2025 by Tokyo Theater.

== Accolades ==
Award	Date	Category	Recipient	Result	Ref.
Berlin International Film Festival	23 February 2025	The Grand Prix of the International Jury for the Best Film in Generation Kplus Special Mention	Seaside Serendipity	Special Mention	
Yokohama Film Festival	1 February 2026	Best Cinematographer	Yuta Tsukinaga	Won	
