= Kakugo wa Ii ka Soko no Joshi =

Japanese manga series

- Cover of vol. 1, first released on June 25, 2014

覚悟はいいかそこの女子。
- Genre: Romantic comedy
- Manga
- Written by: Nana Shiiba
- Published by: Shueisha
- Imprint: Margaret Comics
- Magazine: Margaret
- Original run: February 5, 2014 – July 19, 2014
- Volumes: 2
- Television drama
- Directed by: Noboru Iguchi
- Written by: Lee Jung-hee
- Studio: Dream Plus
- Original network: MBS; TBS
- Original run: June 25, 2018 – July 23, 2018
- Episodes: 5
- Live-action film
- Directed by: Noboru Iguchi
- Produced by: Kii Muneyuki; Hirō Maruyama
- Written by: Lee Jung-hee
- Music by: Kyohei
- Studio: Dream Plus
- Released: October 12, 2018
- Runtime: 95 minutes
- icon

Kakugo wa Ii ka Soko no Joshi (Japanese: 覚悟はいいかそこの女子。; lit. "Are You Ready? Hey, You, Girl!", titled Lock-On Love internationally for the live-action film) is a Japanese manga series by Nana Shiiba. Kakugo wa Ii ka Soko no Joshi was serialized in the biweekly shōjo manga magazine Margaret from February 5, 2014, to July 19, 2014.

A live-action film adaptation was released in Japan on October 12, 2018. To promote the live-action film, a television drama adaptation featuring the same cast was broadcast on MBS and TBS from June 25, 2018, (Note: MBS lists the premiere date as June 24, 2018, at 26:10, which is June 25, 2018, at 2:10 a.m. Subsequent broadcasts are listed on Sundays at 24:50, which are Mondays at 12:50 a.m.) to July 23, 2018, as part of the programming block Dramaism.

== Plot ==
High school student Towa Furuya is popular among the girls in his class for his good looks. When his friends point out that he's never had a girlfriend, he decides to ask Misono Miwa, the most beautiful girl in their grade. Misono instantly rebuffs his advances and continues to act cold towards him, and, shocked, Towa tries to figure out what went wrong. Once he discovers that she is in love with Mr. Masaki, their language teacher, he becomes determined to win her over.

Towa attempts to get closer to Misono by moving into her apartment next door and protecting her from debt collectors. Meanwhile, he begins genuinely falling in love with her as he learns more about her.

== Characters ==
Towa Furuya (古谷 斗和, Furuya Towa)
Portrayed by: Taishi Nakagawa
Towa is the most popular boy in school who is admired for his attractive appearance since childhood, but he has never had a girlfriend. He has no experience in love and, compared to his cool appearance, he is described as "pathetic." He desperately pursues Misono, to the point of protecting her from debt collectors and moving next door to her.
Misono Miwa (三輪 美苑, Miwa Misono)
Portrayed by: Erika Karata
Misono is described as a "cool" and "beautiful" first-year student who rejects Towa's affections for her.
Ichiya Sawada (澤田 惟智也, Sawada Ichiya)
Portrayed by: Shouma Kai
Ichiya is Towa's friend.
Ritsu Nīmi (新見 律, Niimi Ritsu)
Portrayed by: Kentaro
Ritsu is Towa's friend.
Takatsugu Masaki (柾木 隆次, Masaki Takatsugu)
Portrayed by: Teppei Koike
Mr. Masaki is the class' language teacher. In the live-action film adaptation, he is their art teacher.

== Media ==
=== Manga ===
Kakugo wa Ii ka Soko no Joshi was written and illustrated by Nana Shiiba. It was serialized in the biweekly shōjo manga magazine Margaret from 2014's issue 5 released on February 5, 2014, to 2014's issue 16 released on July 19, 2014. Since its release, the manga has been titled the "pioneering manga with pathetic men." The chapters were later released in two bound volumes by Shueisha under the Margaret Comics imprint.

No.	Japanese release date	Japanese ISBN
1	June 25, 2014	9784088452265
2	August 25, 2014	9784088452524

=== Film ===
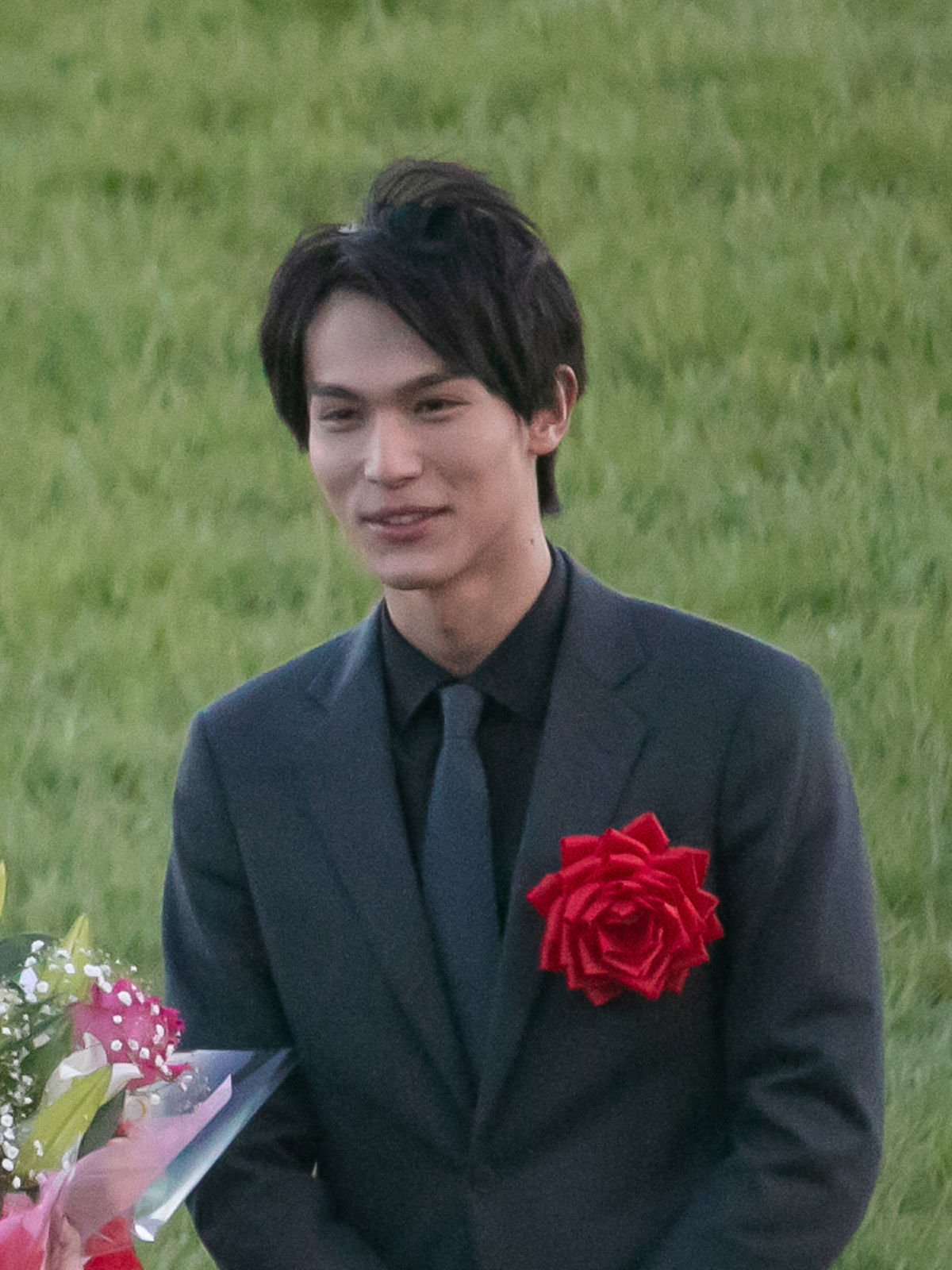
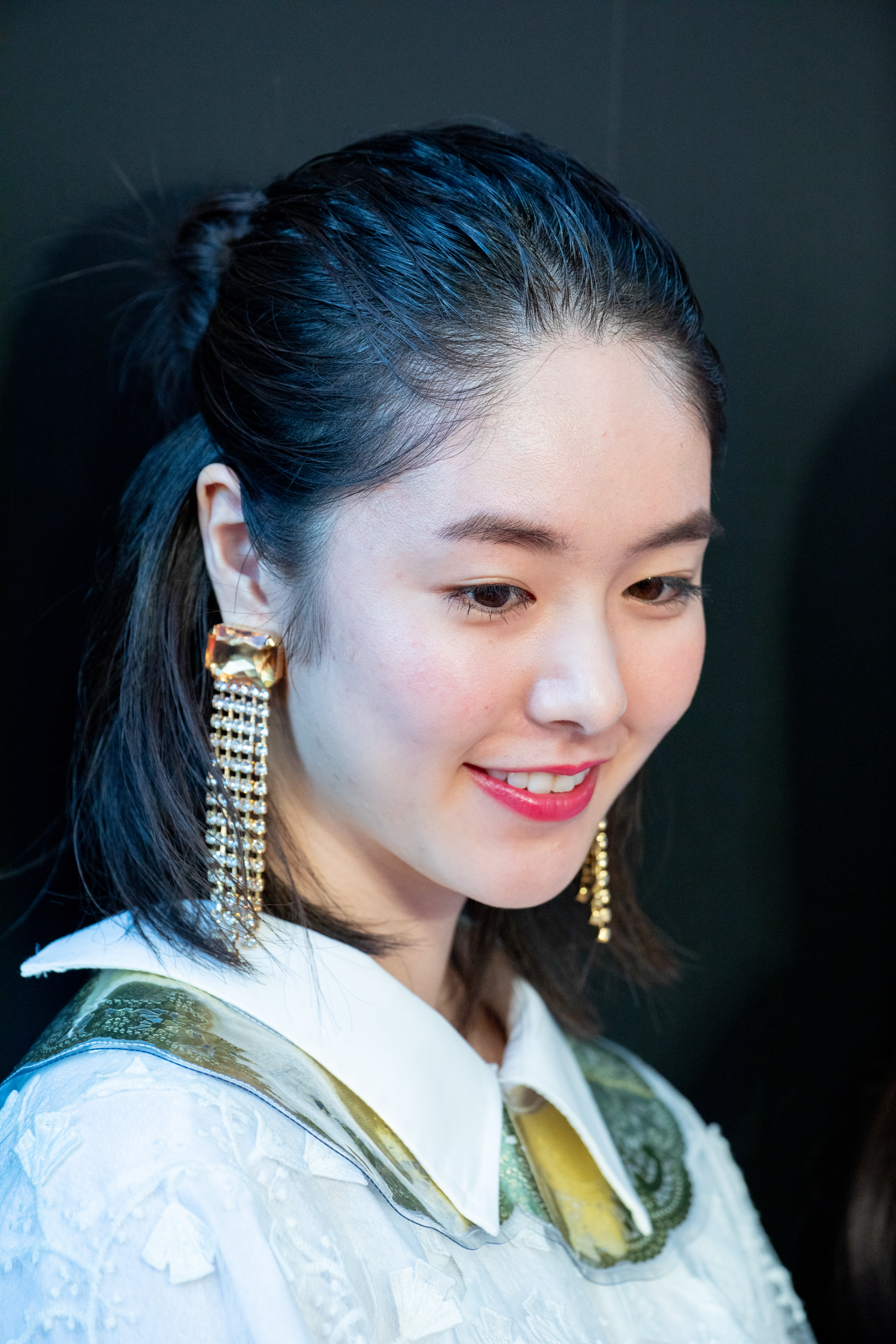
Taishi Nakagawa (left, pictured in 2018) and Erika Karata (right, pictured in 2018) co-starred in the live-action film and drama adaptations.

In early April 2018, the 2018 issue 9 of Margaret teased an "important announcement" regarding Nana Shiiba's manga. A live-action film adaptation of Kakugo wa Ii ka Soko no Joshi was announced on April 20, 2018. The film stars Taishi Nakagawa as Towa. The supporting cast consists of Kentaro as Ritsu, Shouma Kai as Ichiya, and Jiei Wakabayashi as Ryūsei Kuze (an original character created for the live-action projects). Later, in June, Erika Karata was revealed to be cast as Misono and Teppei Koike as Mr. Masaki. Filming took place between mid-December 2017 and January 2018.

The film was directed by Noboru Iguchi and written by Lee Jung-hee. It was distributed by Toei Company. The film's theme song is "Hibiscus" by Naoto Inti Raymi and the insert song is "Yakusoku" by Cider Girl. The film adaptation was released nationwide in Japan on October 12, 2018. It was later licensed by Rakuten Viki, who released the film with English subtitles under the title Lock-On Love, but their license has since expired.

=== Television drama ===
To promote the live-action film adaptation, a five-episode promotional television drama was broadcast weekly on MBS and TBS (Note: TBS broadcasts episodes two days after MBS. TBS lists the premiere date as June 26, 2018, at 25:35, which is June 27, 2018, at 1:35 a.m. Subsequent broadcasts are listed on Tuesdays at 25:28, which are Wednesdays at 1:28 a.m.) as part of the programming block Dramaism from June 25, 2018, to July 23, 2018. The television drama is an original screenplay by Lee Jung-hee, the writer of the film adaptation. It is set before the events of the film, focusing on the friendship between Towa, Ritsu, Ichiya, and Ryūsei. Lee had written the script for the drama after the film and struggled trying to link it with the film adaptation, as the drama is based on an original screenplay.

The opening theme song is "Sweet Devil" by Super Dragon, while the songs "Hibiscus" and "Yakusoku" from the film adaptation will also appear in the television drama. On June 11, 2018, Yuri Tsunematsu was cast as the lead female character, Kosame Asakura.

==== Episodes ====
No.	Title	Directed by	Written by	Original release date
1	"Defeat: A Boy Like Towa"; Transliteration: "Datō Towa na Danshi." (Japanese: 打倒・斗和な男子。)	Noboru Iguchi	Lee Jung-hee	June 25, 2018
Ritsu falls in love with Kosame, Towa's cousin. Meanwhile, Tōma Naitō (Yosuke Sugino), the ace of the basketball team, declares Towa as his rival and is determined to usurp his position as the most popular boy in school.
2	"A Boy Who's Truly Hopeless"; Transliteration: "Maji Muri no Danshi." (Japanese: マジ無理の男子。)	Noboru Iguchi	Lee Jung-hee	July 2, 2018
Sōta Majima (Taketo Tanaka), an average-looking boy, begins to imitate Towa in order to appeal to girls.
3	"Two Close Male Friends Who Fall in Love with the Same Girl"; Transliteration: "Onnaji Joshi o Suki ni Natte Shimatta Nakayoshi Futari-gumi no Danshi." (Japanese: 同じ女子を好きになってしまった仲良し二人組の男子。)	Noboru Iguchi	Lee Jung-hee	July 9, 2018
Hiroshi Masusawa (Taiko Katono) and Akira Uyama (Shunsuke Nishikawa) are best friends, but they fall in love with the same girl.
4	"A Boy Who Falls in Love with Towa Like a Girl"; Transliteration: "Towa ni Koi Suru Otome na Danshi." (Japanese: 斗和に恋する乙女な男子。)	Noboru Iguchi	Lee Jung-hee	July 16, 2018
Kenji Nakagaito (Masaki Nakao) is struggling in his relationship with his loving girlfriend, Akane Miyahashi (Hikaru Ohsawa), only to realize he is in love with men. Meanwhile, Kosame is looking for band members and asks Ritsu to take part.
5	"Ritsu's Love"; Transliteration: "Ritsu no Koi." (Japanese: 律の恋。)	Noboru Iguchi	Lee Jung-hee	July 23, 2018
Ritsu decides to confront his feelings for Kosame.

== Reception ==
Kono Manga ga Sugoi! reviewed volume 2 of Kakugo wa Ii ka Soko no Joshi favorably, describing it as a "positive, heartwarming love story" with "warm, supportive affection" for Towa. Taishi Nakagawa won Newcomer of the Year at the 42nd Japan Academy Film Prize for his work on the live-action film adaptation, as well as the live-action film adaptation of Kids on the Slope.
