= Kono Koi wa Tsumi nano ka!? =

Japanese manga series

- Tankōbon volume cover

この恋はツミなのか!?
- Manga
- Written by: Hyte Torishima
- Published by: Shogakukan
- Imprint: Big Superior Comics
- Magazine: Big Comic Superior
- Original run: January 12, 2018 – May 25, 2018
- Volumes: 1
- Television drama
- Directed by: Dan Ogawa
- Written by: Yume Shiozuka
- Original network: MBS, TBS
- Original run: December 3, 2018 – December 24, 2018
- Episodes: 4
- icon

Kono Koi wa Tsumi nano ka!? (この恋はツミなのか!?; "Is This Love a Sin/Checkmate!?") is a Japanese manga series written and illustrated by Hyte Torishima. It was serialized in Shogakukan's seinen manga magazine Big Comic Superior from January to May 2018, with its chapters collected in a single tankōbon volume.

== Characters ==
Taiga Kohinata (小日向 大河, Kohinata Taiga)
Portrayed by: Kentaro Ito
Tae Komada (駒田 多恵, Komada Tae)
Portrayed by: Yuki Kashiwagi

== Media ==
=== Manga ===
Written and illustrated by Hyte Torishima, Kono Koi wa Tsumi nano ka!? was serialized in Shogakukan's seinen manga magazine Big Comic Superior from January 12 to May 25, 2018. Shogakukan collected its chapters in a single tankōbon volume, released on June 29, 2018.

=== Drama ===
A four-episode television drama adaptation, starring Yuki Kashiwagi and Kentaro Ito, was broadcast in Japan on MBS and TBS's Dramaism programming block from December 3–24, 2018. (Note: MBS listed the air dates for the series on Sunday at 24:50, which is effectively Monday at 00:50 a.m. JST.)
