= Transit Girls =

2015 Japanese drama TV series

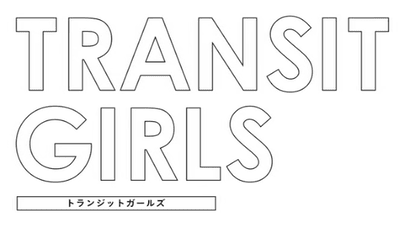
- Title card for the series
- Genre: Romantic drama, girl's love
- Written by: Ayako Kato
- Directed by: Masato Maeda
- Starring: Sairi Ito; Yui Sakuma; Kentaro
- Opening theme: "Prom Night" by Kenji Furuya
- Country of origin: Japan
- Original language: Japanese
- No. of episodes: 8

Production
- Producers: Ayaka Matsumoto (East Entertainment); Tomohiko Seki (Cogito Works)
- Running time: 25 minutes

Original release
- Network: Fuji Television
- Release: November 7 – December 26, 2015

Transit Girls (トランジットガールズ, Toranjitto Gāruzu; stylized as TRANSIT GIRLS) is a Japanese television series that premiered on Fuji Television on November 7, 2015 and ended on December 26.

It is the first lesbian-themed Japanese television drama and was created by the staff of reality series Terrace House and was called a "spin-off".

== Characters ==
Sayuri Hayama

Sayuri Hayama (葉山 小百合, Hayama Sayuri) is the protagonist and she is in grade three of high school.

Sayuri Hayama is portrayed by Sairi Ito (伊藤 沙莉, Itō Sairi).

Yui Shida

Yui Shida (志田 ゆい, Shida Yui) is the other protagonist who aims to be a professional photographer.

Yui Shida is portrayed by Yui Sakuma (佐久間 由衣, Sakuma Yui).

Nao Fukuzawa

Nao Fukuzawa (深澤 直, Fukuzawa Nao) is a student in high school and childhood friend of Sayuri.

Nao Fukuzawa is portrayed by Kentaro (健太郎, Kentarō).

Mirai Kadowaki

Mirai Kadowaki (門脇 未來, Kadowaki Mirai) is Sayuri's high school classmate.

Mirai Kadowaki is portrayed by Riko Yoshida (吉田 里琴, Yoshida Riko).

Aoi Kurata

Aoi Kurata (倉田 葵, Kurata Aoi) is Sayuri's other high school classmate.

Aoi Kurata is portrayed by Erena Watanabe (渡辺 恵伶奈, Watanabe Erena).

Ryutaro Saeki

Ryutaro Saeki (佐伯 柳太朗, Saeki Ryūtarō) is a professional photographer and his assistant is Yui.

Ryutaro Saeki is portrayed by Shogen (尚玄, Shōgen).

Madoka Shida

Madoka Shida (志田 まどか, Shida Madoka) is Yui's mother.

Madoka Shida is portrayed by Reika Kirishima (霧島 れいか, Kirishima Reika).

Keigo Hayama

Keigo Hayama (葉山 圭吾, Hayama Keigo) is Sayuri's father.

Keigo Hayama is portrayed by Mummy-D.

== Episodes ==
No.	Title	Written by	Original release date
1	"1/8"	Ayako Kato	November 7, 2015
Sayuri Hayama is third grade high school student whose mother died two years ago and lives with her father Keigo. One day, Keigo is remarried to Madoka, which became Sayuri's stepmother and her daughter, Yui, as her stepsister. She does not accept the sudden event when Yui made a kiss to her.
2	"2/8"	Ayako Kato	November 13, 2015
Sayuri is deprived from Yui's lips. She was confused during their unexpected first kiss, while not hearing about the spirit of the kiss from Yui will not create irritation.
3	"3/8"	Ayako Kato	November 21, 2015
Sayuri thinks straight to Yui. The next day, she became sick, and Yui takes care of her which will change their relationship.
4	"4/8"	Ayako Kato	November 28, 2015
While Sayuri is asleep, Yui kissed her. Sayuri noticed it and in the next morning they result in awkwardness. Sayuri goes to her neighbor's house instead of her home which Yui doesn't know.
5	"5/8"	Ayako Kato	December 5, 2015
Being questioned by Yui, Sayuri noticed her feelings and kissed. Yui speaks to herself that their relationship between Sayuri became closer. Sayuri later confessed confess to Nao and Mirai on how she is feeling now.
6	"6/8"	Ayako Kato	December 12, 2015
Sayuri is stunned that she and Yui directly liked each other. Yui notices Sayuri's thoughts, and gently hugs her. When they later sleep in bed, Madoka saw them.
7	"7/8"	Ayako Kato	December 19, 2015
Yui and Sayuri's parents, Madoka and Keigo wanted to know their relationship. Keigo questions to Sayuri, who remained silent, and Yui tells that she is serious. The next day, Yui disappears.
8	"8/8"	Ayako Kato	December 26, 2015
Yui and Madoka leaves the Hayama's house. Later Sayuri saw Madoka, and gives information about Yui. The sisters' relationship is missing.
