= Brave Father Online: Our Story of Final Fantasy XIV =

2019 Japanese film

- Directed by: Teruo Noguchi; Kiyoshi Yamamoto (game scenes)
- Written by: Kota Fukihara
- Based on: Final Fantasy XIV (video game) by Square Enix; Final Fantasy XIV: Dad of Light (television drama miniseries) by; Teruo Noguchi; Kiyoshi Yamamoto; Dad of Light (online diary) by Maidy
- Produced by: Masahiro Honda; Kazuya Naito; Koji Shirasugi; Kazuhiro Yokoyama; Yanghwe Yoon
- Starring: Kentaro Sakaguchi; Kōtarō Yoshida; Maika Yamamoto; Naomi Zaizen
- Cinematography: Hikaru Yasuda
- Edited by: Takeshi Wada
- Music by: Hideharu Mori
- Production companies: Gambit; Mainichi Broadcasting System; Gaga Corporation; VAP; Square Enix; Amata
- Distributed by: Gaga Corporation
- Release date: June 21, 2019 (Japan)
- Running time: 114 minutes
- Country: Japan
- Language: Japanese

Brave Father Online: Our Story of Final Fantasy XIV (Japanese: 劇場版 ファイナルファンタジーXIV 光のお父さん, Hepburn: Gekijōban Fainaru Fantajī Fōtīn: Hikari no Otōsan; lit. "Final Fantasy XIV: The Movie: Dad of Light") is a 2019 Japanese comedy drama film based on a Japanese television drama miniseries Final Fantasy XIV: Dad of Light, which is based on blog post Dad of Light written by Maidy. The film stars Kentaro Sakaguchi, Kōtarō Yoshida, Maika Yamamoto and Naomi Zaizen.

== Synopsis ==
Brave Father Online: Our Story of Final Fantasy XIV is a 2019 Japanese comedy drama film based on a Japanese television drama miniseries Final Fantasy XIV: Dad of Light, which is based on blog post Dad of Light written by Maidy. The film stars Kentaro Sakaguchi, Kōtarō Yoshida, Maika Yamamoto and Naomi Zaizen.

== Cast ==
- Kentaro Sakaguchi as Akio Iwamoto
- Kōtarō Yoshida as Akira Iwamoto
- Maika Yamamoto as Miki Iwamoto
- Naomi Zaizen as Yukiko Iwamoto
- Yui Sakuma as Satomi Ide
- Kou Maehara as Kensuke
- Yui Imaizumi as Kataoka
- Nonomura Hanano as Ogasawara
- Jundai Yamada as Kenichiro Mihara
- Masato Wada as Hidetaka Nakajima
- Ryuta Sato as Shintaro Yoshii
- Yoshino Nanjō as Maidy (voice)
- Minako Kotobuki as Aru-chan (voice)
- Aoi Yūki as Kirin (voice)

== Production ==
Original story author Maidy said that they were happy to help create a film version of their story as there were still issues to explore not covered by the television series. Differences from the television version of the story, Final Fantasy XIV: Dad of Light, include the addition of a fourth sibling to the family. Another change was to have other characters play Final Fantasy XIV not just father and son. Square Enix also gave the filmmakers their own game server to control the time of day and weather in order to film exactly the kinds of shots they wished.

With the production crew filming on a private server, crew members created characters and appeared in the background to make the world feel like the regular game. Since the television series was released, many features were added to make characters more expressive including group poses and facial expressions. Game footage was recorded at 120 frames per second to allow for the seamless use of slow motion effects. Changes were also made to a key story moment where the son is turned around by his father in game, changing the televisions wholly in-game perspective to one showing the father and son playing the game and deciding what to do.

== Release and reception ==
The film was released in Japan by Gaga on June 21, 2019, and on Netflix Japan on July 21, 2020.

Famitsu recommended the film, saying that viewers familiar with the television version of the story or fans of massively multiplayer online role-playing games will particularly love the story. The film ranked first in Japanese survey app Pia for audience satisfaction for the weekend it released.

The South China Morning Post gave the film 3.5 out of 5 stars, saying the project was like a "glorified commercial" as well as a touching melodrama. A special screening of the film was done in Japan after Maidy, the story's original author, died from cancer.
