= Final Fantasy XIV: Dad of Light =

2017 Japanese-language television miniseries

- Genre: Drama
- Starring: Yudai Chiba; Ren Osugi; Mako Ishino
- Country of origin: Japan
- Original language: Japanese
- No. of seasons: 1
- No. of episodes: 8

Original release
- Network: MBS/TBS
- Release: April 17 – June 1, 2017

Final Fantasy XIV: Dad of Light (Note: Fainaru Fantajī Fōtīn: Hikari no Otōsan (ファイナルファンタジーXIV 光のお父さん)) is an eight-part 2017 Japanese-language drama miniseries starring Yudai Chiba, Ren Osugi and Mako Ishino. It was released on April 17, 2017, on MBS/TBS, and on Netflix worldwide on September 1.

== Plot ==
The plot revolves around Akio Inaba (Yudai Chiba) who rekindles his bond with his retired and distant father Hirotaro (Ren Osugi) through the online role-playing game Final Fantasy XIV. Akio's plan is to connect with his father in-game and that it will expand into the real world.

== Cast ==
- Yudai Chiba as Akio Inaba
- Ren Osugi as Hirotaro Inaba
- Mako Ishino as Kimiko Inaba
- Fumika Baba as Yoko Shoda
- Yoshihiko Hakamada
- Hatsunori Hasegawa
- Kentarô Shimazu
- Kosuke Imai
- Komegumi Koiwasaki
- Chieri Ajioka
- Ryôtarô
- Nao Honda
- Masayuki Shida
- Hirota Ohtsuka
- Minako Kotobuki
- Aoi Yūki
- Kaede Yuasa
- Taishi Murata
- Yuriko Ohshima as Narration
- Yoshino Nanjō as Maidy (in-game voice)

== Production ==
The premise of the show comes from a Japanese blog written by a Final Fantasy XIV player who introduced the game to his elderly father. The show was originally translated as Daddy of Light, but was changed to Dad of Light for its international release.

=== In-game footage ===
Director Kiyoshi Yamamoto said that no computer graphic manipulation was used as the budget of a half hour drama is more limited and thought it was best to avoid using it. During development, there was an idea of sticking an in-game camera on a player to simulate what the father and son were experiencing. Many on the filmmaking team were skeptical, but Yamamoto experimented for two weeks and showed the team a video storyboard demonstrating that it could be done. There was discussion about what frame-rate for the game footage should be, since the footage is from a family's apartment internet, or if they should focus more on the footage looking good. After a week of experimentation, Yamamoto settled on 30 frames per second at 4K. Yamamoto not only helped produce the show but helped make the game footage. Another challenge was the lack (at the time) of facial expressions within the game. The footage was shot on a public Final Fantasy XIV server, known as Gungnir, which is in a Japanese data center, known as Elemental.

== Release ==
Square Enix released two advertisements for Final Fantasy XIV using footage from the series.

== Reception ==
The review aggregator Rotten Tomatoes reported that 100% of critics have given the series a positive review based on 6 reviews, with an average rating of 6.6/10. IGN found the show "charming", but thought the premise too long for an eight-episode series, and that Final Fantasy XIV didn't look as good as the actors portrayed it to be. GQ Magazine said that the show was not particularly deep, well acted or surprising, but still found it compelling and earnest. The Verge described the series as "silly and sweet", calling the slow absorption of Akio's father into the game adorable. Polygon praised the title as a "joy to watch", also saying it was relatable and unassuming. The Japan Times reflected on how the show signals an increase in Japanese television coming into the Western consciousness, with many of the "weird Japan" stereotypes of previous decades being replaced by more relatable, "charming", and calming material.

=== Legacy ===
Dad of Light was adapted into a film, titled Brave Father Online: Our Story of Final Fantasy XIV, which was released on June 21, 2019.
