= We Couldn't Become Adults =

- Directed by: Yoshihiro Mori
- Written by: Ryō Takada
- Based on: "We Couldn't Become Adults" by Moegara
- Starring: Mirai Moriyama; Sairi Ito; Masahiro Higashide; Sumire; Atsushi Shinohara; Yuko Oshima; Masato Hagiwara
- Cinematography: Akiyoshi Yoshida
- Edited by: Norihiro Iwama
- Music by: Tomisiro
- Production companies: C&I Entertainment
- Distributed by: Netflix
- Release date: November 5, 2021
- Running time: 124 minutes
- Country: Japan
- Language: Japanese

We Couldn't Become Adults (ボクたちはみんな大人になれなかった, Boku-tachi wa Minna Otona ni narenakatta) is a 2021 Japanese film written by Ryō Takada and directed by Yoshihiro Mori and starring Mirai Moriyama and Sairi Ito. It was released by Netflix on November 5, 2021.

== Plot ==
The story moves back and forward in time, between 2020 and 1998, showing Makoto's life, generally in reverse, focusing on his career and his past relationships.

The story starts with Makoto falling into some rubbish on the deserted night time streets of Tokyo, with a friend on the street. His friend tells him that the 1% of the world are only happy because they are ignorant. This starts Makoto thinking about his life.

It then jumps to Makoto at a farewell event for a long running show, hosted by Mitsuo Oguro, that is now finally finishing after years. He discusses with some people at the event what they are now doing with their lives. He meets one of the performers and he tells her he was a graphics person for the show. They stay over together at his hotel room.

The story then reverts to an earlier time when he is with Megumi Ishida. He is now divorced from her, and breaks up with her, but amongst her taking her possessions, he sees a postcard of a sunset from an ex girlfriend. He keeps it.

Makoto then reminiscences about various things in his life. He remembers meeting Su, at his regular hang out, run by crossdressing pub owner Nanase. He takes Su back to her house but realises she is a prostitute.

He then reminisces about various partners, and he reflects over his life and his career. The story shows his career, moving backwards the company he worked for now bigger, was originally smaller and in smaller offices. He has spent a lot of his life working long hours, and has had numerous failed relationships.

Mid point through the plot, Makato gets a Facebook friend request from Kaori, the ex girlfriend that sent the postcard. He looks at her profile on Facebook, and finds that she is now married with children. Despite the fact that she never wanted to do the "ordinary" when they were going out, its revealed that its exactly what she did. She had said not to live your life in an ordinary way, but she had also said that life is about who you are with.

Makoto had been living his life following his interpretation of things she had said, while she had gone off and got married and had children, and was herself now happy.

The plot eventually reflects on his first girlfriend. She is an alternative girl, who loved music and dressed alternatively. The plot shows their early relationship. He was working at a cake shop at the time, and the manager, Toshihiko Nanase gives him a personal advertisement from a newspaper. He answers the advertisement and has a letter correspondence with the girl, who calls herself Inu-cara. He meets up with her, starting to develop a relationship, she reveals her name to be Kaori. They spend their first night in a cheap love hotel, which becomes a regular event in an astrology themed room.

At the time it shows him leave the bakery before he goes to work in the graphics company. The bakery manager, Nanase gives him flowers as a farewell present, but does not let him know he loves him. The plot shows more of his relationship with Kaori. She is a free spirit, and hates doing the ordinary. However, he is working long hours for a company. She encourages him to write a novel, but he never has time. She eventually leaves him.

Finally, Makoto, now back in the present is leaving a pub when he meets Nanase, who is being roughly thrown out of another pub. Nanase is down on his luck, his pub having been now closed (possibly due to COVID restrictions). The movie comes back to the start of the movie where they are both lying in the rubbish. Nanase, gets him a taxi, telling him to leave. Makoto eventually gets out of the taxi and looks around the old parts of the town where he spent time with Kaori. The love hotel is now closed, and he looks at the various locations, eventually going to the location where they first met. He reflects on his relationship, and her, and how through his life, he could not become an adult.

== Cast ==
- Mirai Moriyama as Makoto Sato
- Sairi Ito as Kaori Kato
- Masahiro Higashide as Kenta Sekiguchi
- Sumire as Sue
- Atsushi Shinohara as Toshihiko Nanase
- Takehiro Hira as Keiichiro Sanai
- Moemi Katayama as Ayaka Iwai
- Amane Okayama as Taniguchi
- Eita Okuno as Miyajima
- Masanobu Takashima as Takayuki Onda
- LaSalle Ishii as Mitsuo Okuro
- Yuko Oshima as Megumi Ishida
- Masato Hagiwara as Hideaki Miyoshi
