= Erika Karata =

Japanese actress (born 1997)

- 唐田えりか
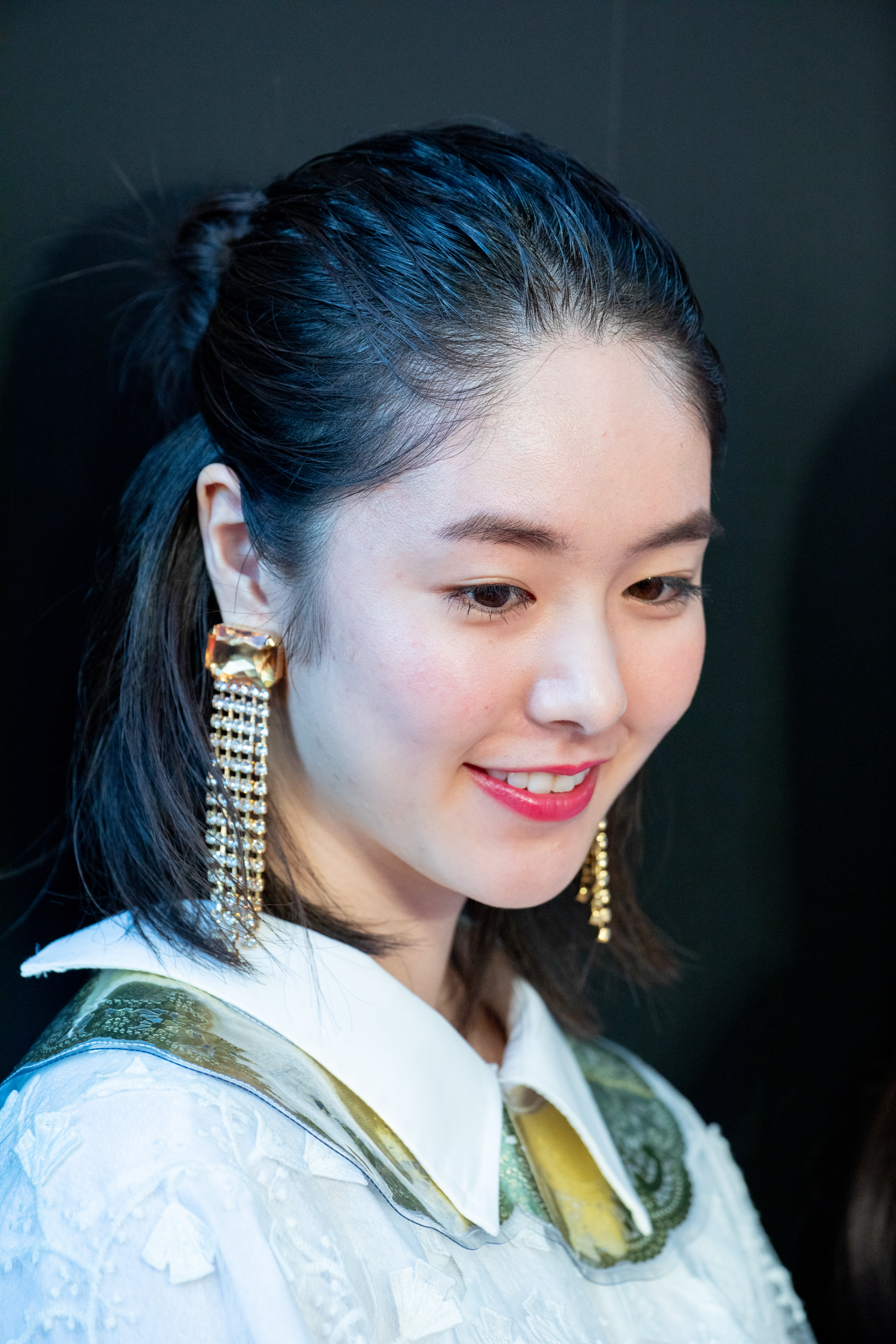
- Karata at the Tokyo International Film Festival, 2018
- Born: September 19, 1997 (age 29); Kimitsu, Chiba Prefecture, Japan
- Occupation: Actress
- Years active: 2014–2020; 2021–present
- Agents: FLaMme; BH Entertainment (South Korea)
- Height: 169 cm (5 ft 7 in)

Erika Karata (唐田 えりか, Karata Erika; born September 19, 1997) is a Japanese actress and former model associated with FLaMme and BH Entertainment. In 2014, she debuted as a model, and in 2017, she began a concurrent modeling and acting career in South Korea. Notable film and television projects that Karata has starred in include Lock-On Love, Asako I & II, and Arthdal Chronicles.

== Biography ==
Karata was born on September 19, 1997, in Kimitsu, Chiba Prefecture, in a single-parent household headed by her mother. She has two elder sisters, one four years older and the other two years older. Because her mother was the sole provider supporting the family financially, she [her mother] was often not at home, but even so, Karata has said that she is close with their mother. Her family lived in the countryside, and she has described her childhood upbringing there as "peaceful surrounded by rice paddies."

== Career ==
When Karata was in her second year of high school, she was scouted by an agency official at her workplace, where she had been a part-time employee at a farm theme park. She began her career as a model and first appeared in the music video for "Divine" by Girls' Generation. Afterwards, she made minor appearances in the television dramas Koi Naka and Cho Gentei Noryoku and became the image model for the Sony Financial Holdings commercials.

In 2017, Karata signed with BH Entertainment to manage her activities in South Korea. During this time, she also appeared in a commercial for LG and a music video for "Emptiness" by Naul. In 2018, Karata starred in Asako I & II, for which she won the Best New Actor Award at the Yokohama Film Festival.

In January 2020, due to her affair scandal involving a married actor, Karata went on a short hiatus from acting for a period of time to reflect on "[Her] thoughtless actions, and [she] has deeply regretted it" and "[She] wants to deeply accept and confront her own weaknesses, foolishness, and naivety."

== Personal life ==
On January 23, 2020, Shūkan Bunshun revealed that Karata had been in an extramarital affair with married actor Masahiro Higashide, her co-star on Asako I & II, since 2017, continuing through his wife's pregnancy with their third child. In response, she dropped out of the television series Prayers in the Emergency Room. Episodes 5 and 6 of 100-Character Ideas Made into a Drama!, which she had co-written and starred in, were removed from broadcast. The episodes had been about a newcomer actress being involved in an extramarital affair and had included the name Higashide for Karata's character's friend.

== Filmography ==
=== Television ===
Year	Title	Role	Note	Ref.
2016	Koe Koi	Reina Midorikawa		
2018	Kiss that Kills	Marin Aota		
2019	Konatsu Biyori	Konatsu	Lead role; short drama	
2019	Harassment Game	Hatsumi Kanō		
2019	Arthdal Chronicles	Karika		
2019	Prayers in the Emergency Room	Miyuki Koyamauchi		
2020	Kingyo Hime	Ayu		
2023	Arthdal Chronicles: The Sword of Aramoon	Karika		
2024	The Queen of Villains	Chigusa Nagayo		
2025	After the Quake	Shimao	Miniseries	
2025	Glass Heart	Miyako Kai		

=== Film ===
Year	Title	Role	Notes	Ref.
2018	Lock-On Love	Misono Miwa		
2018	Asako I & II	Asako Izumiya	Lead role	
2019	21st Century Girl		Lead role; "For Lonesome Blossoms" segment	
2019	Cheer Boys!!	Sakura Takagi		
2019	Blood Friends	Maki Watabe	Lead role	
2022	No Hō e, Nagareru	Satomi	Lead role	
2023	Mujō no Sekai	Yui	Lead role; "Kiss Me at Dead of Night" segment	
2023	Playing Dead	Kana		
2023	When Morning Comes, I Feel Empty	Nozomi Iizuka	Lead role	
2024	Desert of Namibia	Hikari Tōyama		
2025	The Man Who Failed to Die	Aya Moriguchi		
2025	Page30	Kotori Hirano	Lead role	
2025	Seaside Serendipity	Yoko		
2025	After the Quake	Shimao		
2025	Love on Trial	Saya Yabuki		
2026	AnyMart	Ogawa		
2026	Mag Mag			
2026	A Side Character's Love Story	Shinozaki		
2026	Man	Kasumi Endo		
2027	The Blue We Touch	Ayane		
2027	The Intertwining	Ji-hyun	Lead role	

== Awards and nominations ==
Year	Award	Category	Nominated work	Result	Ref.
2019	40th Yokohama Film Festival	Best New Actor	Asako I & II	Won	
