= Hatsukoi Scandal =

Japanese manga series

初恋スキャンダル (Hatsukoi Sukyandaru)
- Manga
- Written by: Akira Oze
- Published by: Shogakukan
- Magazine: Shōnen Big Comic
- Original run: 1981 – 1986
- Volumes: 18
- Live-action television film
- Original network: Fuji Television
- Released: July 21, 1986

Hatsukoi Scandal (Japanese: 初恋スキャンダル, Hepburn: Hatsukoi Sukyandaru; "First Love Scandal") is a Japanese manga series by Akira Oze. It won the award for best shōnen manga at the 31st Shogakukan Manga Award. It was adapted into a TV special in 1986.

== Cast ==
- Ryōko Sano
- Kazumi Kawai
- Naoto Nagashima
