= Gakkō no Kaidan (2015 TV series) =

2015 Japanese drama TV series

- Poster
- Genre: Drama
- Written by: Tomoko Yoshida
- Directed by: Seiichi Nagumo; Yūma Suzuki; Minoru Tabei
- Starring: Suzu Hirose; Ryūnosuke Kamiki
- Ending theme: "Uchōten" by B'z
- Country of origin: Japan
- Original language: Japanese
- No. of series: 1
- No. of episodes: 10

Production
- Producers: Yūta Fukui; Toshiaki Nanba; Kinya Yagi
- Running time: 45 minutes

Original release
- Network: NTV
- Release: January 10 – March 14, 2015

Gakkō no Kaidan (学校のカイダン; English title "The Girl's Speech") is a Japanese television drama series premiered on NTV on 10 January 2015. This drama has nothing to do with the Japanese horror film of the same name. The first episode was extended by 15 minutes. It received the viewership rating of 9.2% on average. In this drama, Suzu Hirose played the lead role for the first time.

== Plot ==
An ordinary high school girl starts a revolution in her school with a talented speechwriter's assistance.

== Cast ==
Main characters

- Suzu Hirose as Tsubame Haruna, a high school girl
- Ryūnosuke Kamiki as Kei Shizukui, a speechwriter

Platinum 8

- Anna Ishibashi as Minami Aso
- Hana Sugisaki as Mimori Koda
- Shotaro Mamiya as Natsuki Sudo
- Jin Shirasu as Takuto Hinata
- Aoi Yoshikura as Emiri Hazuki
- Marie Iitoyo as Rena Ibuki
- Ryo Narita as Riku Okura
- Kentaro Ito as Haru Senzaki

Others

- Shigeru Izumiya as Tokujirō, Tsubame's grandfather
- Atsuko Asano as Mitsuko Honda, chief director of the school
- Katsuhisa Namase as Hirao Kintoki, a vice principal
- Maho Nonami as Sumire Hibiki, a school counselor

== Episodes ==
No.	Title	Directed by	Original release date	Ratings (%)
1	"腐った学園をコトバで変える! 弱虫女子の大逆襲が始まる!"	Seiichi Nagumo	January 10, 2015	9.0
2	"半径5センチの仲間 背中押す勇気の言葉"	Seiichi Nagumo	January 17, 2015	10.6
3	"勝つためにバカになれ!エリートVS弱虫"	Yūma Suzuki	January 24, 2015	8.4
4	"ズルい大人達へ! 子供が叫ぶ願いの言葉"	Yūma Suzuki	January 31, 2015	10.6
5	"一番笑う人は一番弱い人? 強き熱い言葉"	Seiichi Nagumo	February 7, 2015	8.7
6	"今の子供は何思う? 親が見誤る子の本音"	Yūma Suzuki	February 14, 2015	10.3
7	"最大の裏切り! 氷の女王が流す涙とは…"	Seiichi Nagumo	February 21, 2015	9.5
8	"私達が教えて欲しい事! 生徒と教師の夢"	Minoru Tabei	February 28, 2015	7.6
9	"大切な人の涙····｡ 私はあなたを救いたい"	Yūma Suzuki	March 7, 2015	9.8
10	"私達が伝えたい事! 叫ぶ最後の言葉とは"	Seiichi Nagumo	March 14, 2015	8.3

Preceded by Hell Teacher Nūbē (11 October 2014 - 13 December 2014)	NTV Saturday Dramas; Saturdays 21:00 - 21:54 (JST)	Succeeded by Do S Deka (11 April 2015 - 20 June 2015)
