= Emi Wakui =

Japanese actress (born 1970)

- 和久井 映見
- Born: 8 December 1970 (age 55); Yokohama, Japan
- Occupation: Actress
- Years active: 1988–present
- Agent: Alpha Agency
- Spouse: Masato Hagiwara (m. 1995; div. 2003)
- Children: 1
- Website: www.alpha-agency.com/artist/wakui

Emi Wakui (和久井 映見, Wakui Emi; born 8 December 1970 in Yokohama) is a Japanese actress. She has won three Japanese Academy Awards: the 1994 Best Actress award for her performance in Rainbow Bridge (Niji no Hashi), and the 1992 awards for Best Supporting Actress and Best Newcomer for her performance as Seiko Kawashima in My Sons.

Multiple dramas featuring Wakui in the 1990s, Tokyo Cinderella Story in 1994, Pure in 1996 , and Virgin Road in 1997, were all hits and gained high ratings.

== Personal life ==
In November 1995, Wakui married actor Masato Hagiwara, with whom she co-starred in the TV drama Natsuko no Sake. She gave birth to a son in October 1999. She and Hagiwara divorced in July 2003, with Wakui taking custody of their son.

== Filmography ==
=== Film ===
| Year | Title | Role | Notes | Ref. |
|---|---|---|---|---|
| 1989 | Beppin no Machi | | | |
| 1990 | Boku to, bokura no natsu | | Lead role | |
| 1991 | No Worries on the Recruit Front | | | |
| 1991 | My Sons | Seiko Kawashima | | |
| 1992 | Angel: Boku no Uta wa Kimi no Uta | Kaori Amano | Lead role | |
| 1993 | Rainbow Bridge | Chiyo | Lead role | |
| 1995 | Birthday Present | | Lead role | |
| 2004 | Tange Sazen: Hyakuman Ryo no Tsubo | | | |
| 2004 | The Taste of Tea | | | |
| 2004 | School Wars: Hero | | | |
| 2005 | Makoto | | | |
| 2006 | Sinking of Japan | | | |
| 2006 | Tsubakiyama's Send Back | | | |
| 2006 | Say Hello for Me | | | |
| 2009 | Feel the Wind | | | |
| 2010 | The Lady Shogun and Her Men | | | |
| 2011 | Princess Toyotomi | | | |
| 2012 | Robo-G | | | |
| 2014 | Unsung Hero | Rinko | | |
| 2015 | Again | | | |
| 2018 | My Retirement, My Life | Nozomi Fujisawa | | |
| 2018 | I Want to Eat Your Pancreas | Sakura's mother (voice) | | |
| 2019 | Strawberry Song | Kōta's mother | | |
| 2020 | Our Story | Yuriko Chitani | | |
| 2021 | The Night Beyond the Tricornered Window | Noriko Mikado | | |
| 2022 | Radiation House: The Movie | Nagisa Ōmori | | |
| 2023 | Fly Me to the Saitama: From Biwa Lake with Love | Naoko Uchida | | |

=== Television ===
| Year | Title | Role | Notes | Ref. |
|---|---|---|---|---|
| 1988 | Hana no Asuka-gumi! | | | |
| 1994 | Natsuko no Sake | Natsuko Saeki | Lead role | |
| 1994 | Tokyo Cinderella Story | Yukiko Matsui | Lead role | |
| 1996 | Pure | Yuka Orihara | Lead role | |
| 1997 | Virgin Road | Kazumi Sakurai | Lead role | |
| 1998 | A Woman Striking a Blow | Kaoru Yoshimura | Lead role | |
| 2000 | Friends | Risa Hiura | | |
| 2002 | Dakishimetai | Mikiko Sawada | Lead role, TV movie | |
| 2003 | Musashi | Rin | Taiga drama | |
| 2006 | Kōmyō ga Tsuji | Nōhime | Taiga drama | |
| 2008 | Chiritotechin | Itoko Wada | Asadora | |
| 2009 | The Waste Land | Yoshiko Iki | | |
| 2010 | Wagaya no Rekishi | Machiko Hasegawa | Mini-series | |
| 2012 | Taira no Kiyomori | Ikenozenni | Taiga drama | |
| 2015 | The Last Cop | Kanako Suzuki | | |
| 2015 | The Emperor's Cook | Empress Teimei | | |
| 2017 | Hiyokko | Aiko Nagai | Asadora | |
| 2019–21 | Radiation House | Nagisa Ōmori | 2 seasons | |
| 2020 | Our Sister's Soulmate | Takako Yoshioka | | |
| 2021 | Reach Beyond the Blue Sky | Shibusawa Ei | Taiga drama | |
| 2023 | What Will You Do, Ieyasu? | Kōdai-in | Taiga drama | |

== Awards and nominations ==
| Year | Award | Category | Work(s) | Result | Ref. |
|---|---|---|---|---|---|
| 1991 | 4th Nikkan Sports Film Awards | Best Supporting Actress | My Sons and No Worries on the Recruit Front | Won | |
| 1992 | 15th Japan Academy Film Prize | Newcomer of the Year | My Sons and No Worries on the Recruit Front | Won | |
| 1992 | 15th Japan Academy Film Prize | Best Supporting Actress | My Sons and No Worries on the Recruit Front | Won | |
| 1992 | 13th Yokohama Film Festival | Best Supporting Actress | My Sons and No Worries on the Recruit Front | Won | |
| 1992 | 65th Kinema Junpo Awards | Best Supporting Actress | My Sons | Won | |
| 1992 | 16th Elan d'or Awards | Newcomer of the Year | Herself | Won | |
| 1994 | 17th Japan Academy Film Prize | Best Actress | Rainbow Bridge | Won | |
| 2008 | 1st Tokyo Drama Award | Best Supporting Actress | Chiritotechin | Won | |
