= Asako I & II =

2018 film by Ryusuke Hamaguchi

- Film poster
- Directed by: Ryūsuke Hamaguchi
- Written by: Ryūsuke Hamaguchi; Sachiko Tanaka
- Based on: Netemo Sametemo by Tomoka Shibasaki
- Starring: Masahiro Higashide; Erika Karata
- Cinematography: Yasuyuki Sasaki
- Edited by: Azusa Yamazaki
- Music by: Tofubeats
- Release dates: May 14, 2018 (Cannes); September 1, 2018 (Japan)
- Running time: 119 minutes
- Country: Japan
- Language: Japanese
- Box office: $627,102

Asako I & II (Japanese: 寝ても覚めても, Hepburn: Netemo Sametemo; "Whether asleep or awake") is a 2018 Japanese romantic drama film directed by Ryūsuke Hamaguchi, starring Masahiro Higashide and Erika Karata. It was selected to compete for the Palme d'Or at the 2018 Cannes Film Festival. It is based on the 2010 novel by Tomoka Shibasaki about a woman who falls in love with two men who look the same but act completely differently.

== Plot ==
In 2009, Asako, a young woman living in Osaka, experiences love at first sight when she meets Baku, a carefree young man. The two quickly begin a whirlwind romance despite the concerns of Asako’s friend Haruyo, who believes Baku’s reckless nature will only lead to heartbreak. Asako becomes deeply infatuated with him and is drawn to his spontaneity and mystery. After spending the night at their friend Nobuyuki’s house, Asako wakes to find Baku gone without explanation. Nobuyuki tells her that such disappearances are common and have occurred ever since Baku’s father died. Baku later returns and reassures Asako that he will always come back to her. However, a voice-over explains that Baku has suddenly disappeared once again, and they lose touch with each other.

Two years later, Asako has moved to Tokyo and works at a coffee shop. One day she encounters Ryohei Maruko, a salaryman employed by a nearby sake company, and is stunned by his near-identical resemblance to Baku. Mistaking him for her former lover, she calls out Baku’s name before realizing he is a completely different person. Although Ryohei is confused by her unusual behavior, he becomes interested in her after unexpectedly helping Asako and her friend Maya secure a place in an art exhibition. Following the event, Maya suggests arranging a dinner gathering so that Ryohei and Asako can spend more time together. Ryohei invites his colleague Kosuke, while Maya joins the group. During dinner, Maya and Kosuke argue over the proper interpretation of characters in Anton Chekhov’s The Seagull, in which Maya is performing, but the evening ultimately goes well.

Ryohei continues to try to win Asako over and eventually succeeds. The two begin dating, while Maya and Kosuke also start a relationship. Despite growing closer to Ryohei, Asako remains haunted by her memories of Baku and struggles to fully commit herself emotionally. One night she suddenly calls Ryohei and tells him they can no longer see each other. Confused, Ryohei attends a performance of Henrik Ibsen’s The Wild Duck, in which Maya is appearing, hoping Asako might be there. Maya informs him that Asako plans to quit her job and is not attending the performance. As soon as the play begins, however, an earthquake strikes. The performance is immediately cancelled, and the audience evacuates. While walking home, Ryohei finds Asako standing alone in the street and the two embrace.

Five years later, Asako and Ryohei are happily living together and have a cat named Jintan. During this time, Haruyo informs Asako that Baku has become a successful actor and model. Ryohei proposes to Asako and tells her to move to Osaka with him, where he’s been offered a new position from his job. Realizing she has never fully explained her past, Asako confesses to Ryohei that her initial attraction to him stemmed largely from his resemblance to Baku. Ryohei gracefully accepts her confession, allowing her to find closure. The next day, they take a look at their new home in Osaka.

However, Baku suddenly shows up at Asako’s apartment in Tokyo and announces his return. On the same evening, while Asako, Ryohei, Maya, Kosuke and Haruyo are celebrating Asako and Ryohei’s engagement at a restaurant, Baku suddenly arrives and asks Asako to leave with him. Unable to resist the unresolved emotions she still associates with her first love, Asako impulsively abandons Ryohei and leaves with Baku in front of everyone, devastating Ryohei and shocking their friends. Asako tells Maya over the telephone to tell Ryohei he can keep Jintan and throw away all of her belongings.

Asako and Baku travel north together to stay at his parents' home which is currently uninhabited for the season, but, on their way there, Asako realizes she was superficial for choosing him over Ryohei. Asako leaves Baku and returns to Osaka to find Ryohei. He refuses to accept her immediately, unable to forgive the betrayal. Reflecting on the consequences of her choices, she sets out in search of Jintan after Ryohei told her he abandoned the cat. Asako visits Nobuyuki, who has since developed amyotrophic lateral sclerosis (ALS), as well as his mother Eiko who cares for her now non-verbal son.

During Asako's search, Ryohei encounters her. Asako follows him home and reunites with Jintan before going upstairs, where she finds Ryohei standing on the balcony overlooking the river. The two speak honestly about the damage caused by her actions. Ryohei admits that her decision to leave with Baku has wounded him so deeply that he may never fully trust her again. Asako accepts responsibility for the pain she caused and acknowledges that their relationship can never return to what it once was.

== Cast ==
- Masahiro Higashide as Ryohei Maruko / Baku Torii
- Erika Karata as Asako Izumiya
- Kōji Seto as Kosuke Kushihashi
- Rio Yamashita as Maya Suzuki
- Sairi Ito as Haruyo Shima
- Daichi Watanabe as Nobuyuki Okazaki
- Kōji Nakamoto as Hirakawa
- Misako Tanaka as Eiko Okazaki

== Release ==
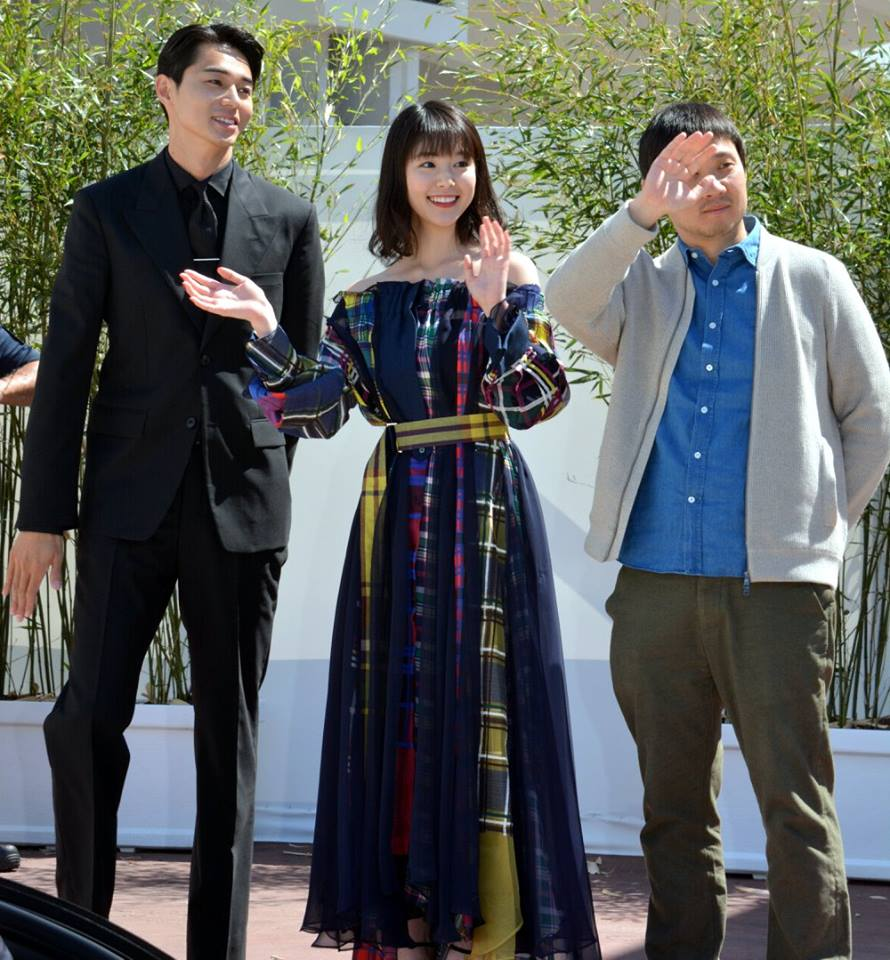
Higashide, Karata, and Hamaguchi at the 2018 Cannes Film Festival.

The film was screened at the 2018 Cannes Film Festival in competition on 14 May 2018. It was released in Japan on 1 September 2018, and in the United States by Grasshopper Film.

== Critical response ==
On review aggregator website Rotten Tomatoes, the film holds an approval rating of 78% based on 49 reviews, and an average rating of 7.3/10. The website's critical consensus reads, "Asako I & II's high-concept premise is anchored by thought-provoking themes and confident, compelling work from director Ryusuke Hamaguchi." On Metacritic, the film has a weighted average score of 68 out of 100, based on 20 critics, indicating "generally favorable reviews".

Peter Bradshaw of The Guardian called the film "an amusing essay in amorous delusion." Yannick Vely, writing for Paris Match, praised Hamaguchi's sympathetic portrayal of characters but suggested that some plot twists might appear forced to Western viewers. Eric Kohn of IndieWire wrote: "It's refreshing to see a high-concept movie that doesn't assume every love story has to reach a tidy conclusion, and implies that some happy endings are best left open-ended."

== Accolades ==
Award	Date of ceremony	Category	Recipient(s)	Result	Ref(s)
40th Yokohama Film Festival	3 February 2019	Best Film	Asako I & II	Won	
40th Yokohama Film Festival	3 February 2019	Best Director	Ryūsuke Hamaguchi	Won	
40th Yokohama Film Festival	3 February 2019	Best Cinematographer	Yasuyuki Sasaki	Won	
40th Yokohama Film Festival	3 February 2019	Best Actor	Masahiro Higashide	Won	
40th Yokohama Film Festival	3 February 2019	Best Supporting Actress	Sairi Ito	Won	
40th Yokohama Film Festival	3 February 2019	Best Newcomer	Erika Karata	Won	
