= Tomoka Shibasaki =

Japanese writer

- 柴崎 友香
- Born: October 20, 1973 (age 52); Osaka, Japan
- Education: Osaka Prefecture University
- Occupation: Novelist
- Writing career
- Language: Japanese
- Genre: Fiction
- Notable works: Haru no niwa (春の庭); Sono machi no ima wa (その街の今は); Kyō no dekigoto (きょうのできごと)
- Notable awards: Akutagawa Prize; Noma Literary New Face Prize; MEXT Award for New Artists
- Website: Novelist: Tomoka Shibasaki

Tomoka Shibasaki (柴崎 友香, Shibasaki Tomoka; born October 20, 1973) is a Japanese writer from Osaka. She has won the Noma Literary New Face Prize and the Akutagawa Prize, and two of her works have been adapted for film.

== Career ==
Shibasaki was born in Osaka. She graduated from Osaka Prefecture University and held an office job for four years while writing fiction. In 1999 she published her first short story, "Reddo, ierō, orenji, burū" ("Red, Yellow, Orange, Blue"). Her first novel, Kyō no dekigoto (A Day on the Planet), was published the next year. In 2003 Kyō no dekigoto was adapted by Isao Yukisada into a film of the same name.

In 2006 Shibasaki won a MEXT Award for New Artists for Sono machi no ima wa (Today, in that City), which was then nominated in 2007 for the Akutagawa Prize, but did not win. In 2010 she won the Noma Literary New Face Prize for Nete mo samete mo, a first-person story about a woman who falls in love, loses her boyfriend, then meets a man who looks identical to her disappeared boyfriend but acts completely differently. In 2014, after having her work nominated three more times for the Akutagawa Prize, Shibasaki finally won the 151st Akutagawa Prize for her novel Haru no niwa (Spring Garden).

In 2016 the Japan Foundation sponsored her residency in the International Writing Program at the University of Iowa. The following year, an English translation of her Akutagawa Prize-winning novel Haru no niwa was published by Pushkin Press under the title Spring Garden. In 2018 Ryūsuke Hamaguchi's film adaptation of Nete mo samete mo, titled Asako I & II, entered the competition at the Cannes Film Festival.

== Recognition ==
- 2006 MEXT Award for New Artists for Sono machi no ima wa (Today, in that City)
- 2010 Noma Literary New Face Prize for Nete mo samete mo
- 2014 151st Akutagawa Prize (2014上) for Haru No Niwa (Spring Garden)

== Film adaptations ==
- A Day on the Planet (きょうのできごと, Kyō no dekigoto), 2003
- Asako I & II, 2018

== Bibliography ==
=== Books in Japanese ===
- Nijiiro to kun, Chikuma Shobo, 2015, ISBN 9784480432599
- Haru no niwa (Spring Garden), Bungei Shunju, 2014, ISBN 9784163901015
- Watashi ga inakatta machi de (In Cities Before My Time), Shinchosha, 2012, ISBN 9784103018322
- Shudaika, Kodansha, 2011, ISBN 9784062769068
- Birijian (Viridian), Mainichi Shinbun, 2011, ISBN 9784620107653
- Nete mo samete mo, Kawade Shobo, 2010, ISBN 9784309020051
- Dorīmāzu (Dreamers), 2009, ISBN 9784062156837
- Hoshi no shirushi, Bungei Shojo, 2008, ISBN 9784163274805
- Furutaimu raifu (Full-time Life), Kawade Shobo, 2008, ISBN 9784309409351
- Shotokatto (Shortcut), Kawade Shobo, 2007, ISBN 9784309408361
- Sono machi no ima wa (Today, in that City), Shinchosha, 2006, ISBN 9784103018315
- Kyō no dekigoto (A Day on the Planet), Kawade Shobo, 2000, ISBN 9784309407111

=== Selected work translated in English ===
- Spring Garden, trans. Polly Barton. Pushkin Press, 2017, ISBN 978-1782272700
- A Hundred Years and a Day: 34 Stories trans. Polly Barton. Stone Bridge Press, February 15, 2025
