= Natsuko no Sake =

Japanese manga series

- Natsuko's Sake
- First tankōbon volume cover

夏子の酒 (Natsuko no Sake)
- Manga
- Written by: Akira Oze
- Published by: Kodansha
- Magazine: Weekly Morning
- Original run: 1988 – 1991
- Volumes: 12
- Television drama
- Original network: Fuji Television
- Original run: January 12, 1994 – March 23, 1994
- Episodes: 11
- icon

Natsuko no Sake (Japanese: 夏子の酒; lit. 'Natsuko's Sake') is a Japanese manga series by Akira Oze. It was adapted into a live-action television series in 1994.

The story centers around Natsuko Saeki, a young woman trying to break into sake making, a business that is traditionally carried out by men.

A prequel to the story by the same author, Natsu no Kura, tells the story of Natsuko's grandmother, Natsu.

== Plot ==
Natsuko Saeki, a young woman working for an advertising company in Tokyo, returns to her family's home in the countryside. There she finds her brother, Yasuo, searching for a "phantom" rice seed called tatsunishiki, rumored to create a new form of sake. He finds a few seeds, but after he passes away suddenly, Natsuko quits her job and begins working at the sake brewery to realize Yasuo's dream of making the best sake in Japan.

== Characters ==
Natsuko Saeki
Portrayed by: Emi Wakui
Wataru Kusakabe
Portrayed by: Masato Hagiwara
Saeko Hashimoto
Portrayed by: Yuki Matsushita
Kazuko Saeki
Portrayed by: Mayumi Wakamura
Gen
Portrayed by: Hatsuo Yamaya
Araki
Portrayed by: Ken Ishiguro
Shizue Tanaka
Portrayed by: Mayumi Hasegawa
Yasuo Saeki
Portrayed by: Kiichi Nakai
