= Kazumi Kawai =

Japanese actress (1964-1997)

- Kazumi Kawai in 1983 on the cover of her photobook Kawaii, Kaniza no Onna no Ko.
- Born: July 9, 1964; Tokyo, Japan
- Died: May 9, 1997 (aged 32); Tokyo, Japan
- Years active: 1982–1997

Kazumi Kawai (可愛 かずみ Kawai Kazumi) (July 9, 1964 – May 9, 1997 in Tokyo, Japan), was a Japanese actress. Her first film was a 1982 Nikkatsu Roman Porno film.

She died on May 9, 1997 at the age of 32. The cause of death was suicide.

== Filmography ==
- Hatsukoi Scandal (1986 TV special)
