= Hirugao =

Japanese media franchise

Hirugao: Love Affairs in the Afternoon (昼顔 -平日午後３時の恋人たち-, Hirugao – Heijitsu Gogo Sanji no Koibito Tachi; transl. "Hirugao: 3 p.m. Weekday Lovers") is a 2014 Japanese TV series followed by a 2017 Japanese film, Hirugao starring Aya Ueto, Takumi Saito, Kichise Michiko and Hiroyuki Hirayama, and produced by Fuji Television Network. The film, directed by Hiroshi Nishitani is based on the drama series of the same title (ja).

== Story background ==
Sawa sees a home burning from her balcony and later learns that it was arson by one of the homeowners. She also sees the family living in a newly built house who also saw the fire. The next day while working in a supermarket, Sawa sees Rikako, the wife of the family living in the new house, commenting to a colleague that Rikako is pretty. Sawa's shift ends then she admires the lipstick display at the store when some running children knock over the lipstick. She picks them up but, impulsively, shoplifts one lipstick that has scattered far away and away from the view of the security cameras. At that moment, while walking out of the store, police nab a juvenile trying to break into a car. Rikako, who is with her boyfriend (not her husband) grabs Sawa and tells her to act as her friend and she won't reveal the shoplifting. Rikako knows that the police report would list her boyfriend and needs an accomplice to say that all three of them are together for afternoon tea.

At the police station, the juvenile's teacher takes the car thief and apologizes.

The TV series continues with Rikako being caught by her husband having an affair and Sawa, hesitant at first, succumbs to Rikako's encouragement to have an affair with the teacher. She is caught by the teacher's wife. The settlement is that the teacher couple and Sawa with her husband will move to another city and if there is any future contact, however brief, between the teacher and Sawa, Sawa would be forced to pay the teacher's wife 300,000 yen/month (USD3000/month) for the rest of her life.

== Plotline for the film ==
Influenced by the novel Belle de Jour by Joseph Kessel, the film follows the story of Sawa, who sleeps with a married man 'heijitsu hirugao tsuma' (while her husband is working). After it becomes known, she moves to escape the harassment, even changing her name. But after the illicit lovers break off the relationship that had resulted in so much destruction, they meet by chance in a small seaside town, and the relationship is once again kindled.

Sawa, now a divorcee, works in a restaurant on the beach in a small town, having moved away from Yokohama. Mr. Kitano is a lecturer at a university but, 3 years after breaking up with Sawa, he is scheduled to give a lecture in the seaside town.

Sawa learns of the lecture and wants to go despite signing a legal agreement to stay away from Mr. Kitano with a monetary penalty to be paid monthly for life for any violations by having contact, however brief, with Mr. Kitano. Sawa sits in the back of the lecture hall, hiding her face, but Mr. Kitano sees her after a student raises his hand to ask a question.

Sawa later sees Mr. Kitano and screams from the bus. They see each other again, meeting once a week by a river in the forest. To abide by the legal agreement, they don't hold hands or even exchange words.

Eventually, Mr. Kitano's wife suspects something. One day, Mr. Kitano and Sawa get on the same bus and decide not to see each other again. Mr. Kitano rides a bus even though he has a dark blue BMW 3 series (internal designation of E90). Mr. Kitano's wife, however, is waiting for them at the bus stop and displays mental instability upon see them. She demands that both of them go with her to the hotel room and have sex in front of her. They reply that they did not do anything other than looking at insects. Sawa runs out of the hotel with Mr. Kitano chasing after her. Mr. Kitano talks with Sawa and says he is going to be with her.

Later in the future, Mr. Kitano and Sawa are living together. Sawa is disliked by the other restaurant employees but not the owner. However, the owner turns against Sawa because his wife left him for another man. Seeing Mr. Kitano, the owner confronts Sawa, so she quits her job.

Mrs. Kitano, who has been mentally unstable since before the film, shows up in a wheelchair. She purposely injured herself by jumping off her apartment balcony but said she fell down a flight of stairs. Mr. Kitano, meeting with his wife periodically to arrange for a divorce, helps his wife to recover. One day, Sawa follows Mr. Kitano and sees him in the same car with his wife. Not knowing that Mr. Kitano was only caring for his wife's handicapped needs, Sawa gets suspicious and eventually confronts Mr. Kitano, who explains.

Mrs. Kitano fakes acceptance of the divorce and tells that to Sawa.

Mr. Kitano wants to marry Sawa and bought an engagement ring. He then hid the ring in the monitoring box containing the scientific measurement instruments next to the river where he and Sawa often meet.

There is then reconciliation. The restaurant owner apologizes to Sawa for his outburst. Mrs. Kitano feigns reconciliation by agreeing to sign divorce papers without a legal contest. She drives Mr. Kitano back to the station. During the drive, she reveals her mental instability. She tells him she purposely caused her injuries. She then crashes the car on purpose, driving it down a ravine. Mr. Kitano dies and his body mutilated. The police do nothing because it's hard to prove in court that there was a murder.

Sawa finds the engagement ring receipt but cannot find the ring. Sawa asks Mrs. Kitano, who doesn't know. Mrs. Kitano then tells Sawa that Sawa killed Mr. Kitano. Then leaves with a slimy smile on her face. Sawa, distraught, attempts suicide but stops before a train hits her. Sawa saw a firefly insect, interpreting it as a sign to go on with life, not suicide. It is then revealed that Sawa is pregnant.

Some time later, a little boy and girl are playing by the river where Mr. Kitano and Sawa met frequently. The little boy finds the engagement ring in the now dilapidated monitoring box by the river and puts it on the girl's finger. The film ends on this note.

== Cast ==
- Takumi Saito
- Michiko Kichise
- Hiroyuki Hirayama
- Aya Ueto
