= Naomi Zaizen =

Japanese actress (born 1966)

- 財前 直見
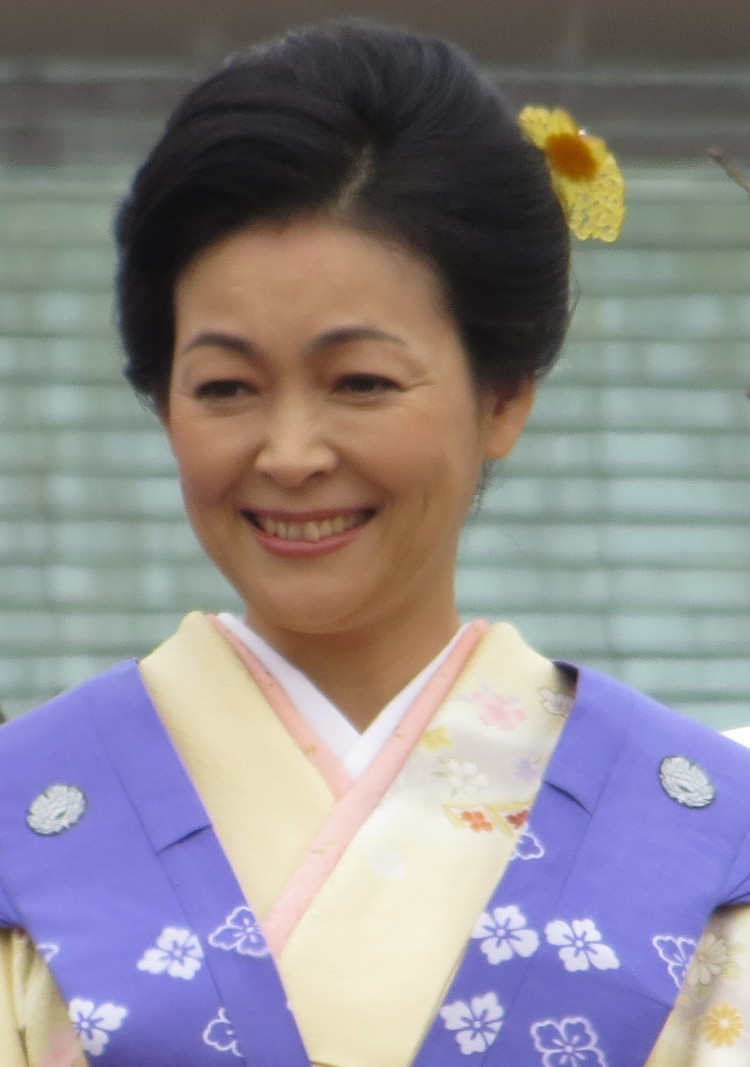
- Naomi Zaizen in February 2014
- Born: 10 January 1966 (age 60); Ōita, Ōita, Japan
- Occupation: Actress
- Years active: 1984 - present

Naomi Zaizen (財前 直見, Zaizen Naomi; born 10 January 1966 in Ōita, Ōita) is a Japanese actress.

== Filmography ==
=== Films ===
- Heaven and Earth (1990), Yae
- Brave Father Online: Our Story of Final Fantasy XIV (2019), Yukiko Iwamoto
- The Women in the Lakes (2024), Ikuko Matsumoto
- Love≠Comedy (2026)

=== Television ===
- Homura Tatsu (1993)
- Yoshitsune (2005), Hōjō Masako
- Carnation (2011), Ryōko Negishi
- Naotora: The Lady Warlord (2017), Chika
- Dear Radiance (2024), Fujiwara no Yasuko

=== Dubbing ===
- Avalon, Ash (Małgorzata Foremniak)
