= Sairi Ito =

Japanese actress (born 1994)

- 伊藤 沙莉
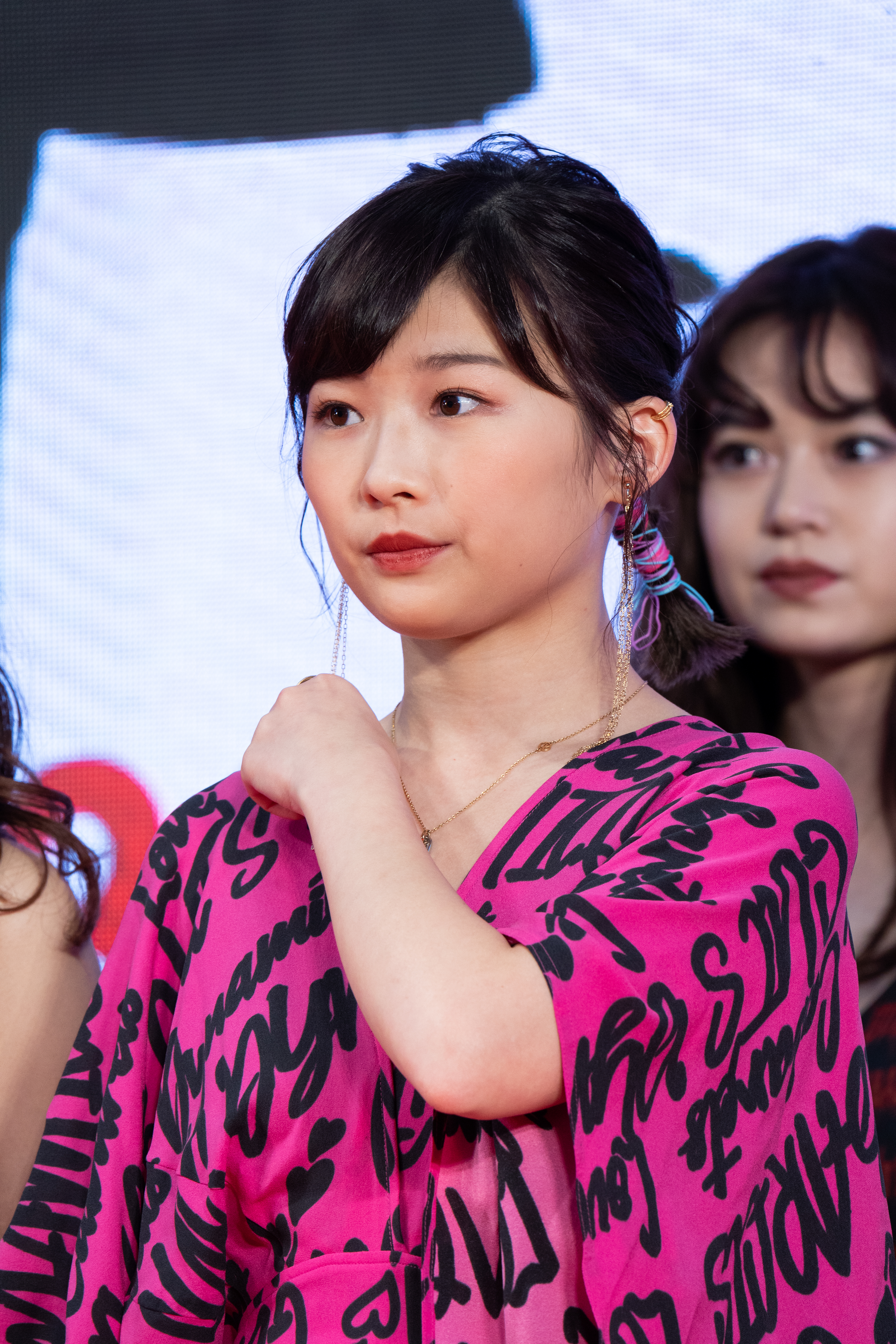
- Ito in 2019
- Born: May 4, 1994 (age 32); Chiba Prefecture, Japan
- Occupation: Actress
- Years active: 2003–present
- Agent: Alpha Agency
- Spouse: Ryuta Horai (m. 2024)
- Website: Official profile

Sairi Ito (Japanese: 伊藤 沙莉, Hepburn: Itō Sairi; born May 4, 1994) is a Japanese actress.

== Career ==
Ito made her debut in the 2003 television drama 14-kagetsu: Tsuma ga Kodomo ni Kaette Iku with no acting experience, playing a female researcher whose body becomes that of a young girl.

In February 2023, she was announced as the lead actress for the asadora series The Tiger and Her Wings, based on the life of Yoshiko Mibuchi, one of Japan's first female lawyers. Ito had previously appeared in the asadora series Hiyokko in 2017.

== Personal life ==
Ito was born on May 4, 1994, in Chiba Prefecture. Her mother chose the name "Sairi", and her grandfather chose the kanji for her name: the character 沙 (sa, sand) takes on the reading "sai". She is the youngest of three siblings: Shunsuke Ito of the comedy duo Oswald is her older brother, and she also has an older sister. Their father ran a road construction company that went bankrupt following the collapse of the bubble economy, and debt collectors pursued him. She and her siblings were raised by their mother and aunt following their parents' divorce. Her mother worked at a snack bar and delivered milk before becoming a painter. Ito has Korean ancestry, though she has stated that she can not speak Korean and has never left Japan. She originally wanted to become a dancer.

In April 2022, Ito was reported to be dating screenwriter Ryuta Horai, who is eighteen years her senior, which she later confirmed. On January 4, 2025, she announced on her radio show that she and Horai had married at the end of 2024.

== Filmography ==
=== Films ===
Year	Title	Role	Notes	Ref.
2006	Inugoe Shiawase no Nikukyū			
2007	Rabbit on the Moon		Lead role, short film	
2007	Tokyo Rendezvous			
2011	Lost Harmony	Ruriko Nishihara		
2012	Lesson of the Evil	Ayumi Nagai		
2013	Tamako in Moratorium			
2014	Love is Possession	Ruka	Anthology film	
2014	Chounouryoku Kenkyubu no 3 Nin			
2015	The Curtain Rises	Rina Takada		
2016	Unrequited Love	Nomura	Lead role, episode 1: My Nickname is Butatchi	
2016	Kabuki Drop			
2017	Love and Other Cults	Ai	Lead role	
2017	One Week Friends			
2017	The Blue Hearts		Anthology film	
2017	The Last Cop: The Movie			
2018	Asako I & II	Haruyo		
2018	Our Blue Moment	Satomi Ishida		
2018	Enokida Trading Post			
2018	Blank 13			
2019	21st Century Girl		Lead role, anthology film	
2019	Little Miss Period	Riho Yamamoto		
2019	Blue Hour			
2019	Life: Untitled		Lead role	
2020	Step			
2020	Theatre: A Love Story	Aoyama		
2020	Hotel Royal	Maria Sakura		
2020	The Devil Wears Jūnihitoe	Rinshi		
2020	Kamata Prelude		Lead role, anthology film	
2020	Poupelle of Chimney Town	Antonio (voice)		
2021	We Couldn't Become Adults	Kaori Katō		
2022	Just Remembering	Yō	Lead role	
2022	Suzume	Rumi Ninomiya (voice)		
2022	Phases of the Moon	Yui Midorisaka		
2023	Life of Mariko in Kabukicho	Mariko	Lead role	
2023	My Brother, the Alien	Sono Sanada		
2023	Don't Call it Mystery: The Movie	Seiko Furomitsu	Cameo	
2025	Purehearted	Majimu Iba	Lead role	
2025	Suzuki=Bakudan	Kōda		
2026	Chimney Town: Frozen in Time	Antonio (voice)		
2026	Crayon Shin-chan the Movie: Spooky! My Yokai Vacation	Yako (voice)		
2027	The Tiger and Her Wings: The Movie	Tomoko	Lead role	

=== Television series ===
Year	Title	Role	Notes	Ref.
2005	Minna Mukashi wa Kodomodatta	Momo Wakatsuki		
2005	The Queen's Classroom	Momo Tanaka		
2005	Girl's Box	Ren	Episode 1	
2006	Chibi Maruko-chan	Shirakawa-san		
2006	Boku no Aruku Michi	Excursion girl		
2006	Iwo Jima: Senjō no Yūbin Haitatsu	Haruko Ichimaru		
2006	Tatta Hitotsu no Koi			
2007	Watashitachi no Kyōkasho	Mai Yamanishi		
2007	Kikujiro to Saki		Episode 7	
2007	Otoko no Kosodate	Mika Sato		
2008	Kiri no Hi	Etsuko Nakamura		
2008	Scrap Teacher	Sairi Osaki		
2009	Yusuke Kamiji Himawari Monogatari			
2011	Taisetsunakoto wa Subete Kimi ga Oshiete Kureta	Sairi Uno		
2012	Soup Curry	Chieko Urata		
2013	Legal High	Kaori Inoue		
2013	Minna! ESPer Dayo!	Yuko		
2014	Great Teacher Onizuka	Kanako Kusumi		
2015	Replay & Destroy			
2015	My Neighbor Seki	Ryoko-senpai	Episode 2	
2015	Transit Girls	Sayuri Hayama	Lead role	
2016	Sono 'Okodawari', Watashi ni mo Kure yo!!	Herself		
2017	Hiyokko	Saori Abe	Asadora	
2018	In This Corner of the World	Sachiko Kariya		
2019	The Naked Director	Junko		
2019	You Can't Expense This!	Mayu Sasaki		
2020	Keep Your Hands Off Eizouken!	Midori Asakusa (voice)	Animation	
2020	Likes! Mr. Genji	Saori Fujiwara		
2020	A Day-Off of Kasumi Arimura	Yūko	Episode 2	
2021	Omameda Towako and Her Three Ex-Husbands	Narrator		
2022	Don't Call it Mystery	Seiko Furomitsu		
2022	Lost Man Found	Yui Higa		
2023	Legal Enforcement with Dogs	Hikari Yoshino	Lead role	
2024	The Tiger and Her Wings	Tomoko Inotsume	Lead role; Asadora	
2026	Yamada-Todoroki Law Firm	Tomoko Sada	Single episode drama	
2026	Straight to Hell	Minori		
2026	Hakone Ekiden: Our Story	Natsuki Miyamoto		

=== Other television ===
Year	Title	Notes	Ref.
2024	75th NHK Kōhaku Uta Gassen	Host	

=== Japanese dub ===
Live-action

Year	Title	Role	Dub for	Notes	Ref.
2022	Jurassic World Dominion	Kayla Watts	DeWanda Wise		

Animation

Year	Title	Role	Notes	Ref.
2019	The Secret Life of Pets 2	Daisy		
2020	Vic the Viking: The Magic Sword	Vic		
2022	The Bears' Famous Invasion of Sicily	Almerina		

== Awards and nominations ==
Year	Award	Category	Work(s)	Result	Ref.
2019	40th Yokohama Film Festival	Best Supporting Actress	Asako I & II and Enokida Trading Post	Won	
2019	28th Tokyo Sports Film Awards	Best Supporting Actress	Asako I & II	Nominated	
2020	57th Galaxy Award	Individual Award in the TV category	Herself	Won	
2020	13th Tokyo Drama Awards	Best Supporting Actress	You Can't Expense This!	Won	
2020	45th Hochi Film Awards	Best Supporting Actress	Hotel Royal and others	Nominated	
2020	33rd Nikkan Sports Film Awards	Best Supporting Actress	Hotel Royal and others	Nominated	
2021	63rd Blue Ribbon Awards	Best Supporting Actress	Hotel Royal and others	Won	
2021	45th Elan d'or Awards	Newcomer of the Year	Herself	Won	
2025	28th Nikkan Sports Drama Grand Prix	Best Actress	The Tiger and Her Wings	Won	
