= Nippon Connection =

Annual film festival held in Frankfurt, Germany

Nippon Connection is a festival for Japanese film which takes place in Frankfurt am Main, Germany, every year in early summer. The festival is organized by the nonprofit organization “Nippon Connection e.V.”. Nippon Connection has become the biggest platform for contemporary Japanese film worldwide, with about 21,000 participants in 2026. The 27th festival edition will take place June 8 to 13, 2027.

== History ==
In 1999 two German students of film studies, Marion Klomfass and Holger Ziegler, decided to show some Japanese films at the Goethe University in Frankfurt am Main. The organizers began by planning for 1,500 visitors, but interest quickly grew and the first edition of the festival in 2000 had more than 10,000 visitors. Thirteen films were screened, and two Japanese filmmakers attended that year.

After a one year break, during which the non-profit association Nippon Connection e.V. was founded, the second Nippon Connection Film Festival took place. The festival center was located at the Students’ House of the Goethe University in Frankfurt am Main. In 2002 a new category for digital productions (Nippon Digital) was created. As well, an exhibition was arranged in cooperation with the Künstlerhaus Mousonturm and the Nippon Connection Newcomer Award for the best up-coming film production was introduced.

At the Nippon Connection Film Festival 2003, a retrospective (Nippon Retro) was held the first time in cooperation with the German Film Museum in Frankfurt am Main. Additional events were also organized in cooperation with the Literaturhaus Frankfurt.

In 2004 parts of the program were sent on tour to Leipzig and Barcelona. The festival organizers were invited to Tokyo to take part in a symposium on the impact of Japanese films abroad by the Japanese Agency for Cultural Affairs (Bunkacho).

In 2005 the tour program was extended and the Nippon Cinema Award was introduced.

In 2007 the Kinema Club held its first European conference at Nippon Connection. That year 170 films were shown.

For the 10th anniversary in 2010, the Nippon Digital Award was established to support rising talents. The winner, chosen by a professional jury, receives a free subtitling for his or her next film. The Nippon Digital Award was renamed in 2011 into the Nippon Visions Award.

2010 was the last year that parts of the Nippon Visions section, which focuses on independent productions, were distributed worldwide to cities including New York, Barcelona, and Berlin under the designation Nippon Connection Film Festival on Tour.

In 2012 the children’s program Nippon Kids was established. From 2012 until 2014, the VGF Nippon in Motion Award was given to the director of the best 12-second spot.

In 2013, the festival was extended to six days, and the main venues were moved to the Künstlerhaus Mousonturm and Theater Willy Praml in der Naxoshalle. Further venues include the cinema at the German Film Museum, the Mal Seh’n cinema, the gallery Ausstellungsraum Eulengasse, and the theater Die Käs. Also in 2013 the festival director Marion Klomfass received an honorary award for her outstanding commitment to the support and promotion of Japanese-German exchange from the Japanese Minister of Foreign Affairs (Gaimu Daijin Hyosho).

In 2014 the Nippon Visions Award became the Nippon Visions Jury Award. Also, an audience award, the Nippon Visions Audience Award, was created. That year the festival drew more than 16,000 visitors.

The 15th edition of the festival in 2015 saw the introduction of the Nippon Honor Award for personalities who have made an outstanding contribution to Japanese cinema in their careers.

In 2018 the new section Nippon Docs was introduced.

In 2020, due to the restrictions imposed by the COVID 19 pandemics, the festival took place exclusively online for the first time from 9 to 14 June 2020 using a video-on-demand platform provided by Shift72. Tokachi Tsuchiya received the Nippon Online Award for the documentary film An Ant Strikes Back for the first time. Also in 2020 the festival team received the JaDe award in Cologne.

In 2023, the new Nippon Rising Star Award was introduced. Its first awardee was the singer and actress Toko Miura.

In 2024, the jury prize Nippon Storytelling Award was presented for the first time for the best screenplay in the Nippon Visions section.

In 2026, the festival introduced the Nippon Animation Shorts award, a jury prize for the best animated short film.

Directors and actors who have attended the festival: Koji Yakusho, Shinobu Terajima, Kiyoshi Kurosawa, Shinya Tsukamoto, Nobuhiro Yamashita, Toshiaki Toyoda, Yuki Tanada, Koji Wakamatsu, Isao Yukisada, Ryuichi Hiroki, Sakura Ando, Kiyohiko Shibukawa, Miwa Nishikawa, Shuichi Okita, Koji Yamamura, Shinsuke Sato, Koji Fukada, Kaori Momoi, Kazuyoshi Kumakiri, Akiko Oku and more.

== Programme ==
Each year Nippon Connection shows more than 100 short and feature films, mostly as German, European or international premieres. The film program is divided into five sections: Nippon Cinema, Nippon Animation, Nippon Visions, Nippon Docs and Nippon Retro. Many Japanese filmmakers present their works personally and participate in panel discussions. In 2026 more than 200 filmmakers and other artists from Japan and other countries visited the festival.

The Nippon Culture section presents lectures, performances, and workshops on various topics of Japanese culture. This includes tea ceremony, taiko drumming workshops, Japanese calligraphy, dance and martial arts performances. In the evenings, there are usually live concerts or parties. International experts on Japanese film give open lectures about various aspects Japanese cinema.

== Award winners ==
Nippon Connection Newcomer Award (2002)

- 2002 Blue Spring (Aoi haru) by Toshiaki Toyoda

Nippon Cinema Award (since 2005)

- 2005 Turn Over - An Angel is Coming on a Bicycle (Tenshi wa jitensha ni notte) by Keiichi Nomura
- 2006 University of Laughs (Warai no daigaku) by Mamoru Hoshi
- 2007 La Maison de Himiko (Mezon do Himiko) by Isshin Inudo
- 2008 Fine, Totally Fine (Zenzen daijōbu) by Yosuke Fujita
- 2009 Detroit Metal City by Toshio Lee
- 2010 Oblivion Island: Haruka And The Magic Mirror (Hottarake no shima: Haruka to mahō no kagami) by Shinsuke Sato
- 2011 Arrietty (Karigurashi no Arietti) by Hiromasa Yonebayashi
- 2012 The Woodsman and the Rain (Kitsutsuki to ame) by Shuichi Okita
- 2013 Key of Life (Kagi dorobō no mesoddo) by Kenji Uchida
- 2014 Pecoross’ Mother and Her Days (Pekorosu no haha ni ai ni iku) by Azuma Morisaki
- 2015 Uzumasa Limelight by Ken Ochiai
- 2016 Ryuzo and the Seven Henchmen (Ryūzō to shichinin no kobuntachi) by Takeshi Kitano
- 2017 The Long Excuse (Nagai iiwake) by Miwa Nishikawa
- 2018 Oh Lucy! by Atsuko Hirayanagi
- 2019 Fly Me to the Saitama (Tonde Saitama) by Hideki Takeuchi
- 2021 his by Rikiya Imaizumi
- 2022 The Asadas (Asadake!) by Ryota Nakano
- 2023 Yudo by Masayuki Suzuki
- 2024 Let's Go Karaoke! (Karaoke iko!) by Nobuhiro Yamashita
- 2025 A Samurai In Time (Samurai taimu surippa) by Junichi Yasuda
- 2026 FUJIKO by Taichi Kimura

Nippon Digital Award (2010)

- 2010 Live Tape by Tetsuaki Matsue

Nippon Visions Award (2011–2013)

- 2011 Doman Seman (Horikawanakatachiuri) by Gō Shibata; Special Mention: Door to the Sea (Umi e no Tobira) by Reiko Ohashi
- 2012 The Sound of Light (Hikari no oto) by Juichiro Yamasaki; Special Mention: Fukushima: Memories of a Lost Landscape (Soma kanka: dai ichi bu - ubawareta tochi no kioku) by Yojyu Matsubayashi
- 2013 A2-B-C by Thomas Ash

Nippon Visions Audience Award (since 2014)

- 2014 Tale of a Butcher Shop (Aru seinikuten no hanashi) by Aya Hanabusa
- 2015 -1287 by Thomas Ash
- 2016 Under the Cherry Tree (Sakura no ki no shita) by Kei Tanaka
- 2017 Start Line by Ayako Imamura
- 2018 Ramen Heads by Koki Shigeno
- 2019 Melancholic by Seiji Tanaka
- 2021 Beyond The Infinite Two Minutes (Droste no hate de bokura) by Junta Yamaguchi
- 2022 Just The Two Of Us (Futari no sekai) by Keita Fujimoto
- 2023 Hoarder On The Border (Danshari paradaisu) by Takayuki Kayano
- 2024 SEPTEMBER 1923 (Fukudamura jiken) by Tatsuya Mori
- 2025 Kaiju Guy! (Kaiju yaro!) by Junichiro Yagi
- 2026 A Unique Country in Asia (Ajia no yuniikuna kuni) by Kenji Yamauchi

Nippon Visions Jury Award (since 2014)

- 2014 Antonym (Rasen ginga) by Natsuka Kusano / Special Mention: Friendship (Tomodachi) by Mikihiro Endo
- 2015 The Cockpit by Sho Miyake / Special Mention: Treasure Ship: Latitudes of Lust (Shikido shiju hatte: takarabune) by Koichiro Ikawa and Dual City by Yokna Hasegawa
- 2016 Dear Deer by Takeo Kikuchi / Special Mention: Under the Cherry Tree (Sakura no ki no shita) by Kei Tanaka and The Man Who Was Eaten (Taberareru otoko) by Keisuke Kondo
- 2017 Poolsideman by Hirobumi Watanabe / Special Mention: Going the Distance (Kazoku e) by Yujiro Harumoto
- 2018 Trace of Breath (Iki no ato) by Haruka Komori / Special Mention: Of Love & Law by Hikaru Toda
- 2019 Sea (Kaibatsu) by Kensei Takahashi / Special Mention: Blue Hour (Buru awa ni buttobasu) by Yuko Hakota
- 2021 Along The Sea (Umibe no kanojotachi) by Akio Fujimoto / Special Mention: Beyond The Infinite Two Minutes (Droste no hate de bokura) by Junta Yamaguchi
- 2022 Unlock Your Heart (Hiraite) by Rin Shuto / Special Mention: Let Me Hear It Barefoot (Hadashi de narashite misero) by Riho Kudo
- 2023 Your Lovely Smile (Anata no hohoemi) by Kah Wai Lim / Special Mention: Sayonara, Girls. (Shojo wa sotsugyo shinai) by Shun Nakagawa
- 2024 LONESOME VACATION by Atsuro Shimoyashiro / Special Mention: Visitors –Complete Edition– (Akuma ga harawata de ikenie de watashi) by Kenichi Ugana
- 2025 Yukiko a.k.a. by Naoya Kusaba
- 2026 A Unique Country in Asia (Ajia no yuniikuna kuni) by Kenji Yamauchi / Special Mentions: Dawn Chorus (Mō ichido mitsumeru) by Yoshinori Sato and Kiiroiko by Mika Imai

VGF Nippon in Motion Award (2012–2014)

- 2012 koi-man by Micaela Fonseca
- 2013 Nippon Invasion by Michael Herber & Liwen Shen
- 2014 Onigiri no origami (Bierfest) by Christine Mai & David Clausmeier

Nippon Honor Award (2015-2022)

- 2015 Tadanobu Asano
- 2016 Kiyoshi Kurosawa
- 2017 Kōji Yakusho
- 2018 Shinobu Terajima
- 2019 Shinya Tsukamoto
- 2022 Masatoshi Nagase

Nippon Docs Award (since 2019)

- 2019 Sending Off (Omiokuri 〜Sending Off〜) by Thomas Ash
- 2021 Ushiku by Thomas Ash
- 2022 Tokyo Kurds by Fumiari Hyuga
- 2023 My Anniversaries (Ore no kinenbi) by Sungwoong Kim
- 2024 The Making Of A Japanese by Ema Ryan Yamazaki
- 2025 Being Kazue ("Kazueteki") by Hiroko Kumagai
- 2026 Tetsuyo Turned 104, Living on her Own (104-sai, Tetsuyo-san no hitorikurashi) by Kazuhiro Yamamoto

Nippon Online Award

- 2020 An Ant Strikes Back (Ari jigoku tengoku) by Tokachi Tsuchiya

Nippon Rising Star Award (since 2023)

- 2023 Toko Miura
- 2024 Kotone Furukawa
- 2025 Kosuke Hayashi
- 2026 Anna Yamada

Nippon Storytelling Award (since 2024)

- 2024 Junichi Inoue for HIJACKED YOUTH – DARE TO STOP US 2 (Seishun jakku – Tomerareruka, oretachi o 2)
- 2025 Suzuyuki Kaneko for Missing Child Videotape
- 2026 Kuninori Yamazaki for Kaneko Fumiko

== Jury members ==
- 2010 Bernd Brehmer, Roland Domenig, Jasper Sharp
- 2011 Maggie Lee, Tom Mes, Rüdiger Suchsland
- 2012 Chris Magee, Andreas Platthaus, Yonghi Yang
- 2013 Keiko Araki, Tetsuaki Matsue, Ken Okubo
- 2014 Alex Oost, Mark Schilling, Alexander Zahlten
- 2015 Kazuyoshi Kumakiri, Ryuichi Hiroki, Tokitoshi Shiota
- 2016 Gunter Deller, Yuka Kimbara, Shozo Ichiyama
- 2017 Bastian Meiresonne, Yuka Sakano, Nobuhiro Yamashita
- 2018 Hiromi Aihara, Daniel Otto, Isao Yukisada
- 2019 Eric Nyari, Tetsuya Shibutani, Katja Wiederspahn
- 2021 Thomas Ash, Ellen Harrington, Toshiyuki Hasegawa
- 2022 Gaby Babić, Erina Ito, Adam Torel
- 2023 Claudia Bertolé, Daishi Matsunaga, Karen Severns
- 2024 Kristina Aschenbrennerova, Daniel Kothenschulte, Naoko Ogigami
- 2025 Panos Kotzathanasis, Natsuki Seta, Thomas Waldner
- 2026 Barbara Wurm, Hayley Scanlon, Kei Ishikawa (Nippon Visions), Fabian Driehorst, Waltraud Grausgruber, Thomas Stellmach (Nippon Animation)

== Retrospectives ==
- 2003 Shuji Terayama
- 2004 Anime Classics – Early Japanese Animated Films (1924 - 1944)
- 2005 Seijun Suzuki
- 2006 Exploding Japan – Subversive Genre Cinema of the 60s and 70s
- 2007 Shooting the Sun – Japanese Experimental Film from 1960 until Today
- 2008 Wizards of Japanese Independent Animation: 1960s - Today
- 2009 Sexploitation and Experimentation: The Many Shades of Pink Film.
- 2010 Best of Nippon Connection 2000-2009
- 2011 Sion Sono
- 2012 Visual Resistance: Protest Culture in Japanese Documentaries
- 2013 Eccentric and Explosive - The Cinema of Sogo Ishii
- 2014 Ko Nakahira - The Wild Child of the Sixties
- 2015 Luminous and Vibrant - The Cinema of Shinji Somai
- 2016 Ghosts and Demons - Scary Tales from Japan
- 2017 Ecstasy & Desire - In the Realm of Roman Porno
- 2018 Elegance & Bloodshed - Japanese Sword Fighting Films from the 1960s
- 2019 Ayako Wakao – Magnificent Icon Of Japanese Cinema
- 2020 Tokyo Stories: Lives And Shapes Of A City
- 2021 Kinuyo Tanaka
- 2022 Stories Of Youth
- 2023 Keisuke Kinoshita
- 2024 Nippon Noir
- 2025 Turning Point – Japanese Cinema of the 90s
- 2026 Tatsuya Nakadai – Man of Many Faces

== Thematic focus ==
Since 2019, each festival features a thematic focus across several sections.

- 2019 Outlaws and Outsiders – Cinematic Insights Into the Margins Of Japanese Society
- 2020 Female Futures? – New Visions Of Women In Japan
- 2021 Family Matters – The Japanese Family between Tradition and Modernity
- 2022 Stories Of Youth – Coming Of Age In Japan
- 2023 Cityscapes And Countryside – Contrasting Lives In Japan
- 2024 Crossing Borders
- 2025 Obsessions – From Passion To Madness
- 2026 Shades of Reality – Between Truth and Fiction

== Design ==
The corporate design of the festival has been one of its trademarks since it was first held in 2000. The colors range from soft rose colors to bright pink.

== Music ==
In addition to the film and cultural programs, the festival team has created music CDs. Sounds recorded in the Tokyo subway were used by German musicians to produce an imaginary soundtrack of the Japanese megacity. This album, Nippon Connection – The Tokyo Metro Soundtrack, was released in 2003 by Label Ckp. In April 2005 the second CD album, Nippon Connection Exchanging Tracks, was released by das modular. Two traditional Japanese pieces of music were made available to 28 remix artists in Europe and the US, who then produced their own personal soundtracks. The festival team gave these compositions to Japanese film directors, who created short films under the project name Exchanging Tracks.

== Organization ==
The festival is organized by the non-profit association Nippon Connection e.V. on a voluntary basis. The organizational team consists of more than 70 people. During the festival, more than 100 additional volunteers support the team. The budget is made up of the festival’s revenues as well as several subsidies and sponsorship payments. Nippon Connection is a member of the Verbund hessischer Filmfestivals (Network of Hessian film festivals) and AG Filmfestival. In 2026 Timon Gremmels, Hessian Minister for Science and Art, Mike Josef, Mayor of the City of Frankfurt, and the Consulate-General of Japan acted as official patrons of the festival.
