= Tokachi =

Tokachi (十勝) is a place name used in or near Tokachi Subprefecture, Hokkaidō. It may also refer to:

- Tokachi District, Hokkaido, in Tokachi Subprefecture
- Tokachi Province (1869–1882), an old province of Hokkaidō
- Tokachi Plain, a plain in eastern Hokkaidō
- Mount Tokachi (Daisetsuzan), a volcano in central Hokkaidō
- Mount Tokachi (Hidaka), a mountain in the Hidaka Mountains of eastern Hokkaidō
- Super Tokachi, a train service in Hokkaidō

== People ==
- Tokachi Tsuchiya (born 1973), Japanese cinematographer
