= Sleeping Man =

Sleeping Man may refer to:

- Sleeping Man (song), a song by John Entwistle
- Sleeping Man (film), a 1996 Japanese film
