= Bounce Ko Gals =

- Theatrical release poster
- Directed by: Masato Harada
- Written by: Masato Harada
- Produced by: Masakatsu Suzuki
- Starring: Kōji Yakusho; Yasue Sato; Hitomi Satō; Yukiko Okamoto; Kaori Momoi; Jun Murakami; Shin Yazawa; Hitomi Miwa
- Cinematography: Yoshitaka Sakamoto
- Edited by: Hirohide Abe
- Music by: Masahiro Kawasaki
- Production companies: Panasonic Digital Contents; Teichiku; TV Tokyo; Horipro; Shochiku
- Distributed by: Shochiku-Fuji Company
- Release date: October 18, 1997 (Japan)
- Running time: 109 minutes
- Country: Japan
- Language: Japanese

Bounce Ko Gals (Japanese: バウンス ko GALS, Hepburn: Baunsu ko gyaru) is a 1997 Japanese crime drama film written and directed by Masato Harada. Its alternative English-language titles are Call Girls and Leaving.

Filmed in somewhat of a documentary style, it follows the course of three girls for a day and a night in the popular district of Shibuya in Tokyo.

The main characters are: Jonko (Hitomi Satō), who runs a group of high-school girls involved in paid dating (in Japanese, Enjo kōsai); Raku (Yasue Sato), a high-schooler and street dancer; and Lisa (Yukiko Okamoto), a student who worked for a year, saving enough money to buy a plane ticket and travel to study in New York City.

== Cast ==
- Hitomi Satō as Jonko
- Yasue Sato as Raku-chan
- Yukiko Okamoto as Risa
- Kōji Yakusho as Ōshima
- Jun Murakami as Sap
- Shin Yazawa as Maru
- Kaori Momoi as Saki
- Maori as Kuji
- Kaitō Ren as Shingo
- Yūjin Harada as Moro
- Hiroshige Ikeda as Neon
- Hitoshi Kiyokawa as Tera
- Kazuki Kosakai as Koide

== Awards and nominations ==
40th Blue Ribbon Awards

- Won: Best Film
- Won: Best Director – Masato Harada
- Won: Best Newcomer – Hitomi Satō

22nd Hochi Film Award

- Won: Best Director – Masato Harada
- Won: Best Actor – Kōji Yakusho
