= Under the Open Sky =

- Theatrical release poster

Japanese name
- Kanji: すばらしき世界
- Directed by: Miwa Nishikawa
- Screenplay by: Miwa Nishikawa
- Based on: Mibun-chō by Ryūzō Saki
- Starring: Kōji Yakusho; Taiga Nakano
- Cinematography: Norimichi Kasamatsu
- Edited by: Tomomi Kikuchi; Ryūji Miyajima
- Music by: Masaki Hayashi
- Production company: Aoi Pro
- Distributed by: Warner Bros. Japan
- Release dates: September 2020 (TIFF); February 11, 2021
- Running time: 126 minutes
- Country: Japan
- Language: Japanese
- Box office: $4,722,021

Under the Open Sky (Japanese: すばらしき世界, Hepburn: Subarashiki Sekai; lit. Wonderful World) is a 2020 Japanese drama film directed and written by Miwa Nishikawa. It stars Koji Yakusho as a former yakuza who has been released from prison after serving 13 years for murder. The film premiered at the 2020 Toronto International Film Festival.

== Plot ==
Masao Mikami is a middle-aged former yakuza who has spent time in and out of prison, and is released after serving 13 years for murder. He sends his inmate files and personal information to a TV company and wants them to find his mother. A young TV director, Tsunoda, looks into his files. Freshly released, Mikami meets his lawyer and his wife and has dinner at their house. The next day, Mikami tries to apply for welfare benefits but the case worker nearly denies him due to his violent past. He has a meltdown, collapses, and is sent to the hospital. The doctor instructs him to take it easy because he is at risk of a heart attack and stroke. Tsunoda meets Mikami and interviews him about his life while filming. Mikami is adjusting to normal life, but struggles with manual labor in his new apartment and ends up back in the hospital.

Tsunoda asks Mikami if he has remorse for his crimes, and Mikami denies it. Mikami finds a few driving jobs and tries to get his 10-year expired license renewed. When the licensing center tells him he needs to retake the tests, he yells at them. He mentions that his ex-wife may still have his old license, and thinks of her during his trial. A flashback of the trial contains his then wife, Kumiko, explaining the situation. A gang member had raided the hostess bar that she and Mikami owned together and had harassed her. Mikami, frantic, stabbed the man 11 times. During Mikami's questioning, he was asked if he knew the man would die, and he said yes. This changed Mikami's manslaughter charge to a murder charge. It is stated briefly that Mikami and Kumiko have a child. In the present day, Mikami goes to Kumiko's apartment, who is now remarried. He bumps into her daughter, and he asks her how old she is. She is 9, and he realizes the girl is not his daughter. He leaves.

Mikami is accused of shoplifting in a grocery store by an employee and gets very upset when the man raises his voice at him. He starts to strip to prove his innocence and the employee, feeling guilty, gives him free food and walks him home. Mikami studies for his driving test, but during the test, he is obviously unprepared and fails miserably. Tsunoda and his boss take Mikami out to dinner and tell him that they are filming his life because his story will touch their viewers. Mikami is skeptical because he only wants to find his mother. The boss tells him that if the program reaches far enough, it might reach his mother. On the way home from dinner, Mikami spots a man being mugged. He pulls them apart and Mikami violently beats them up. Tsunoda's boss forces him to film them, but he is clearly afraid and frantically runs away. He gets home and rewatches the footage, focusing on the very graphic clip of Mikami biting the man's back.

Tsunoda, in response to Mikami's violent outburst, calls him to say that putting him on TV is a bad idea. He thinks that Mikami does not think about his consequences and has not learned his lesson. They argue and he asks Mikami if he is the way he is due to childhood trauma and abuse. Mikami, upset at Tsunoda, hangs up and breaks apart a pen for a slip of paper with a phone number, belonging to Akimasa Shimoinaba, whom Mikami refers to as “brother”. He flies to meet him. Akimasa's sister tells Mikami that the yakuza is a failing business. She asks him if he is coming back, to which Mikami does not reply. Tsunoda calls Mikami, wondering where he is and that his orphanage is looking through his files and that they are getting closer to finding his mother.

Mikami finds police outside Akimasa's house. Distraught, he runs toward them, but Akimasa's sister stops him and tells him to run. Tsunoda and Mikami reunite at home, this time without his camera. They visit Mikami's orphanage, but find that his records are long gone. In the communal showers, Tsunoda tells Mikami that he will write about him and his life, and tears up when he asks him not to go back to his old ways. Mikamu only nods. The case worker finds Mikami back in his home and helps him with a potential trainee position in a nursing home, which he lands. He celebrates with his friends, happily singing at dinner with a celebratory cake.

At work, he finds two boys harassing an employee with a disability. He imagines beating them with a broom, but instead collapses while gripping his chest. He sits with his coworkers while they gossip about the aforementioned employee. It is revealed that he was also an ex-con and they make fun of him without knowing of Mikami's history. He controls his anger. The employee stops Mikami before he leaves and gives him flowers, which causes Mikami to tear up. On the way home, Kumiko, his ex-wife, calls him. She asks him for a date with her and her daughter, and they chat about his new life.

Mikami collapses in his apartment and takes his last breath as he grips the flowers. Tsunoda runs to his home and the first responders hold him back as he sobs for Mikami. His friends gather at the entrance of his home.

== Cast ==
- Kōji Yakusho as Masao Mikami
- Taiga Nakano as Ryūtarō Tsunoda
- Seiji Rokkaku as Ryōsuke Matsumoto
- Yukiya Kitamura as Hisatoshi Iguchi
- Hakuryu as Akimasa Shimoinaba
- Midoriko Kimura as Masuko Shimoinaba
- Shūhei Takahashi
- Maho Yamada
- Rina Sakuragi as Lily-san
- Yōhei Matsukado
- Tamaki Shiratori
- Eita Okuno
- Takumi Matsuzawa
- Masami Nagasawa as Haruka Yoshizawa
- Narumi Yasuda as Kumiko Nishio
- Meiko Kaji as Atsuko Shōji
- Isao Hashizume as Tsutomu Shōji

== Production ==
Miwa Nishikawa was inspired by Ryozo Saki's novel, Mibuncho, which follows the story of a criminal after his conviction. Nishikawa felt it the world needed to know the story, so she adapted it into a film. Nishikawa wanted to do her own personal research, similar to how Saki interviewed criminals for his books. She researched how life in prison changed since the book was written decades ago. Nishikawa visited Asahikawa Prison in Hokkaido, where the character Mikami served his time, and interviewed many organized crime members. She also had to adapt the story into modern times, as the book was released in 1990.

== Accolades ==
Award	Category	Recipient	Result	Ref
56th Chicago International Film Festival	Best Performance	Kōji Yakusho	Won	
15th Asian Film Awards	Best Actor	Kōji Yakusho	Nominated	
43rd Yokohama Film Festival	Best Cinematography	Norimichi Kasamatsu	Won	
76th Mainichi Film Awards	Best Film	Under the Open Sky	Nominated	
76th Mainichi Film Awards	Excellence Film	Under the Open Sky	Won	
76th Mainichi Film Awards	Best Director	Miwa Nishikawa	Nominated	
76th Mainichi Film Awards	Best Screenplay	Miwa Nishikawa	Nominated	
76th Mainichi Film Awards	Best Actor	Kōji Yakusho	Nominated	
76th Mainichi Film Awards	Best Supporting Actor	Taiga Nakano	Won	
76th Mainichi Film Awards	Best Cinematography	Norimichi Kasamatsu	Won	
76th Mainichi Film Awards	Best Art Direction	Keiko Mitsumatsu	Nominated	
76th Mainichi Film Awards	Best Music	Masaki Hayashi	Won	
45th Japan Academy Film Prize	Best Film	Under the Open Sky	Nominated	
45th Japan Academy Film Prize	Best Director	Miwa Nishikawa	Nominated	
45th Japan Academy Film Prize	Best Screenplay	Miwa Nishikawa	Nominated	
45th Japan Academy Film Prize	Best Actor	Kōji Yakusho	Nominated	
45th Japan Academy Film Prize	Best Supporting Actor	Taiga Nakano	Nominated	
45th Japan Academy Film Prize	Best Cinematography	Norimichi Kasamatsu	Nominated	
45th Japan Academy Film Prize	Best Lighting Direction	Kenjiro Sō	Nominated	

== Reception ==
Under the Open Sky grossed $4,722,021 at the box office.
