= Tremble All You Want =

2017 film directed by Akiko Ohku

- Film poster

Japanese name
- Kanji: 勝手にふるえてろ
- Directed by: Akiko Ohku
- Screenplay by: Akiko Ohku
- Starring: Mayu Matsuoka; Daichi Watanabe; Anna Ishibashi; Takumi Kitamura; Hairi Katagiri
- Cinematography: Natsuyo Nakamura
- Edited by: Hiroyuki Yoneda
- Music by: Masaki Takano
- Production companies: Horipro; Phantom Film; Nagoya Broadcasting Network; Sony Music Entertainment Japan; The Asahi Shimbun Company; Hyogo Vendor
- Release date: December 23, 2017 (Japan)
- Running time: 117 minutes
- Country: Japan
- Language: Japanese

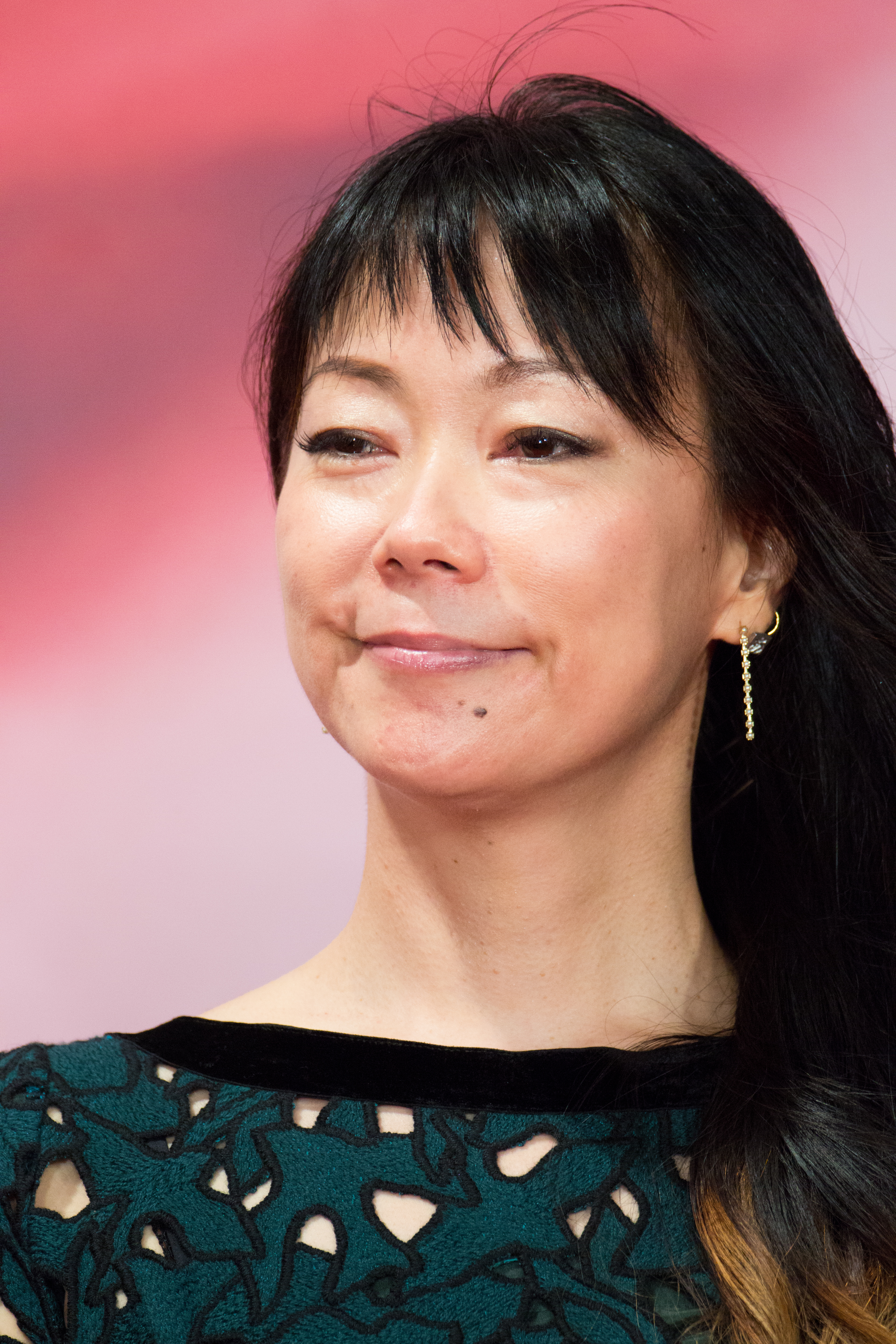
Director Ohku at the opening ceremony of the Tokyo International Film Festival 2017

Tremble All You Want (Japanese: 勝手にふるえてろ, Hepburn: Katte ni furuetero) is 2017 Japanese romantic comedy film written and directed by Akiko Ohku. The screenplay is based on the 2010 novel of the same name by Risa Wataya. The film premiered at 2017 Tokyo International Film Festival and won the Audience Award. Mayu Matsuoka, who plays the lead role, was nominated for Outstanding Performance by an Actress in a Leading Role in the 42nd Japan Academy Film Prize.

== Plot ==
Yoshika Etō (Mayu Matsuoka) is a 24-year-old accountant who has never had a boyfriend before. She still dreams of being with her middle school crush, whom she calls Ichi (meaning "number one"), although they have not talked in years. At work, a man she calls Ni (meaning "number two") starts showing a romantic interest in her. She begins spending time with him outside of work, even as she still daydreams of being with Ichi. When she is alone at her apartment, she spends her free time researching extinct animals on Wikipedia, especially ammonite fossils, going so far as to order a fossil through the mail.

Before committing to Ni, she decides that she needs to try to reunite with Ichi. She devises a way to meet him by pretending to be another classmate on social media and inviting their middle school class to a class reunion. Ichi shows up to the reunion and Yoshika learns that he has relocated to Tokyo. The group of classmates who live in Tokyo agree to meet again at one of their apartments for another get together. Yoshika attends the second reunion, where she fantasizes of Ichi remembering her and the drawings of him as a prince that she used to make when she was younger, but realizes that he does not seem to recognize her.

She continues spending time with Ni and eventually develops true feelings for him. They have a date at a zoo and agree to go steady. However, Yoshika soon becomes embarrassed when she finds out that her co-worker and friend Kurumi (Anna Ishibashi) told Ni that she is a virgin who has never been kissed before. She tells him that she wants to pursue Ichi so that they can break up and gets maternity leave from work so that she can avoid her coworker and Ni. She eventually receives a voicemail from Kurumi apologizing for upsetting her and congratulating her on her pregnancy. Yoshika reconsiders her situation and calls Ni. They meet at her apartment where they reconcile their differences and kiss.

== Cast ==
- Mayu Matsuoka as Yoshika Etō
- Daichi Watanabe as Kirishima (Ni)
- Anna Ishibashi as Kurumi
- Takumi Kitamura as Ichi
- Hairi Katagiri as Oka Rina
