= Koji Yakusho =

Japanese actor (born 1956)

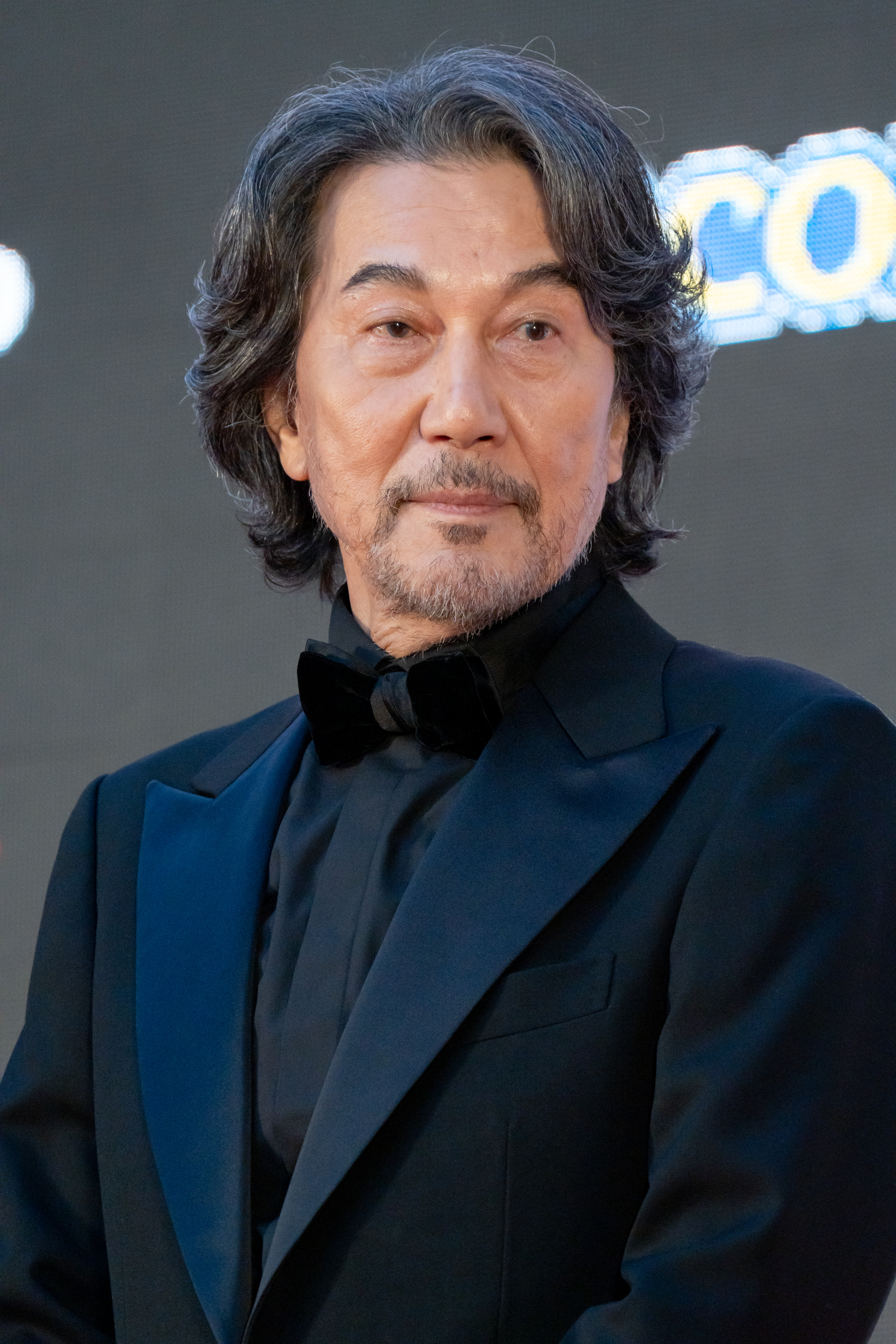
- Yakusho at the 36th Tokyo International Film Festival in 2023
- Born: Kōji Hashimoto; 1 January 1956 (age 70); Isahaya, Nagasaki, Japan
- Occupation: Actor
- Years active: 1978–present
- Spouse: Saeko Kawazu (m. 1982)
- Children: 1

Kōji Hashimoto (橋本 広司, Hashimoto Kōji; born 1 January 1956), known professionally as Kōji Yakusho (役所 広司, Yakusho Kōji), is a Japanese actor. He is known internationally for his starring roles in Shall We Dance? (1996), Cure (1997), 13 Assassins (2010), The Third Murder (2017), The Blood of Wolves (2018), Under the Open Sky (2020) and The Days (2023). For his performance in Perfect Days (2023), he was awarded the Best Actor award at the 76th Cannes Film Festival.

== Early life and education ==
Yakusho was born in Isahaya, Nagasaki, the youngest of five brothers. After graduation from Nagasaki Prefectural High School of Technology in 1974, he worked at the Chiyoda municipal ward office, or kuyakusho, in Tokyo, from which he later took his stage name.

== Career ==
In 1976, he saw a production of Maxim Gorky's The Lower Depths (Played by Tatsuya Nakadai) and was inspired, first to watch, and then later to take part in, as many plays as possible. In the spring of 1978 he auditioned for Tatsuya Nakadai's the Mumeijuku (Studio for Unknown Performers) acting studio, and was one of four chosen out of 800 applicants.

In 1983, he landed the role of Oda Nobunaga in the year-long NHK drama Tokugawa Ieyasu and was catapulted to fame. He also appeared in a TV version of Miyamoto Musashi from 1984 to 1985. For several years, he played Kuji Shinnosuke (or "Sengoku"), one of the title characters in the jidaigeki Sanbiki ga Kiru!. He played a major character in Juzo Itami's 1986 Tampopo.

In 1988, he was given a special award for work in cinema by the Japanese Minister of Education, Science, Sports and Culture and continued to appear in films and in a number of TV shows through the '90s.

In 1996 and 1997, Yakusho enjoyed several major successes. The Eel, directed by Shohei Imamura, in which he played the eel-loving lead, won the Palme d'Or at the 1997 Cannes Film Festival. Lawrence Van Gelder in the New York Times called his performance "unerring." Lost Paradise, about a double-suicide, was second only to Princess Mononoke at the Japanese box office.

=== International breakthrough: Shall We Dance? ===
Shall We Dance? was such a major hit in Japan that it inspired a domestic dance craze. Ballroom groups and dance schools multiplied in the country after the film's release, and people who previously would never admit to taking lessons announced that they did with pride. Director Masayuki Suo said of his lead, who until that point was known mostly for playing good-looking samurai, "we thought he could play this overworked, tired Japanese businessman, and he did.... He pulled everything off and took his dance training so seriously."

The film also was one of Japan's highest-grossing movies outside the country. It earned $9.5 million in the US and inspired a remake starring Jennifer Lopez and Richard Gere, with Gere playing Yakusho's role.

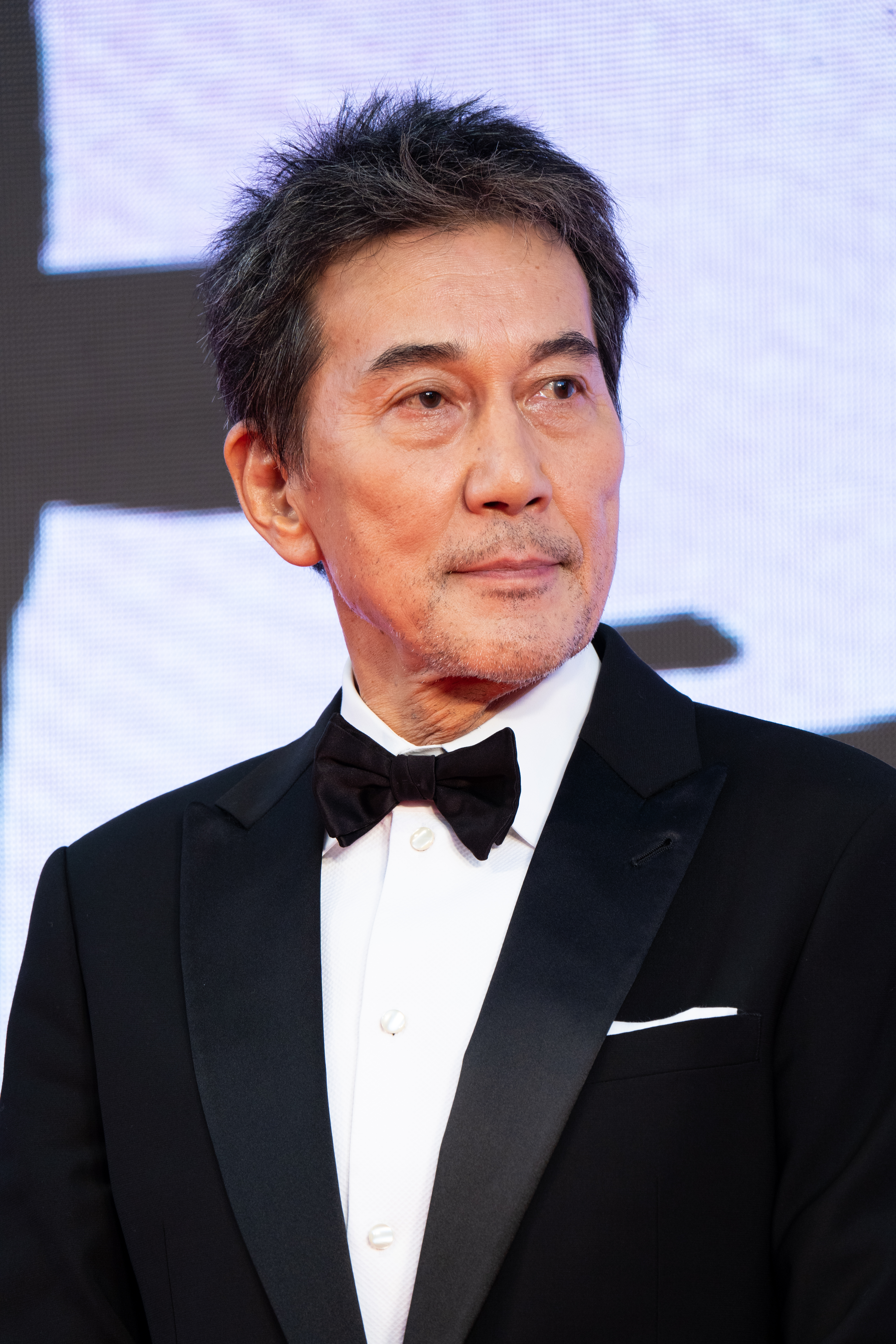
Koji Yakusho at the 32nd Tokyo International Film Festival in 2019

Yakusho next won the Hochi Film Award for Best Actor for Bounce Ko Gals, a film which dealt with high school prostitution specifically, and money worship in general. He collaborated with horror director Kiyoshi Kurosawa in Cure, License to Live, Seance, Charisma, Pulse, Doppelganger, Retribution, and Tokyo Sonata. Yakusho found further recognition with international audiences to some extent with roles in such films as Memoirs of a Geisha and Babel. In the latter, directed by Alejandro González Iñárritu, he played the father of the deaf person played by Rinko Kikuchi.

=== Continued success ===
In 2009, he debuted as director of Toad's Oil. In 2010 and 2011 he was part of both ensemble casts in Takashi Miike's samurai films, 13 Assassins and Hara-Kiri: Death of a Samurai. The latter was in 3D and the first 3D film to be in competition at the Cannes Film Festival.

In the 2011 war drama film Rengō Kantai Shirei Chōkan: Yamamoto Isoroku, Yakusho portrayed Admiral Isoroku Yamamoto. Yakusho was reportedly the only actor considered for the role; had he not accepted it, the film would have been canceled.

In 2018 he was in The Blood of Wolves. For his performance in Perfect Days, directed by Wim Wenders, Yakusho won best actor at the 2023 Cannes Film Festival. In the same year, he has been selected 2023 Taipei Golden Horse Film Festival’s filmmaker in focus.

== Filmography ==
=== Film ===
Year	Title	Role	Notes	Ref.
1979	Hunter in the Dark	Kuwano		
1979	Eireitachi no oenka: saigo no sôkeisen			
1980	Twelve Months	Young soldier (voice)		
1981	Willful Murder	Journalist		
1982	Onimasa	Kondō		
1982	Himeyuri no Tô	Otaka		
1982	The Legend of Sayo	Hatsutaro		
1985	Tampopo	Man in White Suit		
1987	The Great Department Store Robbery	Cello player		
1988	Another Way: D-Kikan Joho	Naoto Sekiya	Lead role	
1990	Pod severnym siyaniyem	Genzo Tamiya	Lead role	
1993	Gurenbana	Kenzo Nakada		
1993	Drug Connection	Ryosuke Kano	Lead role	
1994	Osaka Gokudo Senso: Shinoidare	Ippei Yoshikawa		
1995	Kamikaze Taxi	Kantake	Lead role	
1996	Shall We Dance?	Shohei Sugiyama	Lead role	
1996	Sleeping Man	Kamimura		
1996	Shabu Gokudo	Makabe	Lead role	
1997	Lost Paradise	Shoichiro Kuki	Lead role	
1997	The Eel	Takuro Yamashita	Lead role	
1997	Bounce Ko Gals	Oshima	Lead role	
1997	Cure	Kenichi Takabe	Lead role	
1998	Kizuna	Takaaki Ise/Tetsuro Haga		
1998	Tadon to chikuwa	Kida	Lead role	
1999	License to Live	Fujimori		
1999	Charisma	Goro Yabuike	Lead role	
1999	Spellbound	Hiroshi Kitano	Lead role	
2000	Swing Man	Movie star		
2000	Dora-heita	Koheita "Dora-heita" Mochizuki	Lead role	
2000	Eureka	Makoto Sawai	Lead role	
2001	Pulse	Ship captain	Cameo	
2001	Warm Water Under a Red Bridge	Yosuke Sasano	Lead role	
2002	The Choice of Hercules	Atsuyuki Sassa	Lead role	
2003	Doppelganger	Michio Hayasaki	Lead role	
2003	Fireflies: River of Light	Mr. Takiguchi		
2003	11′09″01 September 11		"Japan" segment	
2004	The Hunter and the Hunted	Detective Jin Sekikawa	Lead role	
2004	Tokyo: Level One	The Governor of Tokyo	Lead role	
2004	Lakeside Murder Case	Shunsuke Namiki	Lead role	
2004	University of Laughs	Mutsuo Sakisaka	Lead role	
2005	Lorelei: The Witch of the Pacific Ocean	Masami Shin'ichi	Lead role	
2005	Memoirs of a Geisha	Nobu	American film	
2006	The Uchōten Hotel	Heikichi Shindo	Lead role	
2006	Babel	Yasujiro Wataya	Foreign film	
2006	Retribution	Noboru Yoshioka	Lead role	
2007	I Just Didn't Do It	Masayoshi Arakawa		
2007	Argentine Baba	Satoru Wakui	Lead role	
2007	Silk	Hara Jubei	Foreign film	
2007	Walking My Life	Yukihiro Fujiyama	Lead role	
2008	Paco and the Magical Book	Onuki	Lead role	
2008	Tokyo Sonata	The Robber		
2009	Mt. Tsurugidake	Morisaku Furuta		
2009	Gelatin Silver Love	Client		
2009	Toad's Oil	Takuro Yazawa	Lead role & director	
2010	13 Assassins	Shinzaemon Shimada	Lead role	
2010	The Last Ronin	Magozaemon Senoo	Lead role	
2011	Hara-Kiri: Death of a Samurai	Kageyu Saito		
2011	Isoroku	Isoroku Yamamoto	Lead role	
2011	Chronicle of My Mother	Kōsaku	Lead role	
2011	The Woodsman and the Rain	Katsuhiko	Lead role	
2012	A Terminal Trust	Shinzo Egi		
2013	The Kiyosu Conference	Shibata Katsuie	Lead role	
2014	The World of Kanako	Akikazu Fujishima	Lead role	
2014	A Samurai Chronicle	Shūkoku Toda	Lead role	
2015	The Emperor in August	Korechika Anami	Lead role	
2015	The Boy and the Beast	Kumatetsu (voice)	Lead role	
2015	Mifune: The Last Samurai	Himself	Documentary film	
2017	Sekigahara	Tokugawa Ieyasu		
2017	Oh Lucy!	Komori	American-Japanese film	
2017	The Third Murder	Misumi		
2018	The Blood of Wolves	Shōgo Ōgami	Lead role	
2018	Mirai	Grandpa (voice)		
2019	Wings Over Everest	Jiang Yuesheng	Lead role; Chinese film	
2019	Whistleblower	Kase	Cameo	
2021	Under the Open Sky	Masao Mikami	Lead role	
2021	The Supporting Actors In Byplaywood	Himself		
2021	Belle	Suzu's father (voice)		
2022	The Pass: Last Days of the Samurai	Kawai Tsugunosuke	Lead role	
2023	Perfect Days	Hirayama	Lead role; Japanese-German film	
2023	Familia	Seiji	Lead role	
2023	Father of the Milky Way Railroad	Masajirō Miyazawa	Lead role	
2023	Totto-Chan: The Little Girl at the Window	Sōsaku Kobayashi (voice)		
2024	Hakkenden: Fiction and Reality	Takizawa Bakin	Lead role	
2025	Snowflowers: Seeds of Hope	Hino Teisai		
2025	Scarlet	Claudius (voice)		
2026	The Brightest Sun	Terainishi		
2026	Children Untold	Jinbe Yamai		
2026	Vivant: The Movie	Nogon Beki		

=== Television ===
Year	Title	Role	Notes	Ref.
1980	Shishi no Jidai	Murakami Taiji	Taiga drama	
1980	Natchan no Shashinkan	Second Lieutenant Kayama	Asadora	
1981	Onna Taikōki	Oda Nobutaka	Taiga drama	
1983	Tokugawa Ieyasu	Oda Nobunaga	Taiga drama	
1984–1985	Miyamoto Musashi	Miyamoto Musashi	Lead role	
1986	Inochi	Hamamura	Taiga drama	
1987	Chotchan	Iruru Kamiya	Asadora	
1987–1995	Sanbiki ga Kiru!	Kuji "Sengoku" Shin'nosuke	7 seasons	
1990	Moeyo Ken	Hijikata Toshizō	Lead role; miniseries	
1991	Takeda Shingen	Takeda Shingen	Lead role; TV movie	
1994	Hana no Ran	Ibuki Saburo Nobutsuna	Taiga drama	
2000	Aikotoba wa Yūki	Jintaro Akatsuki	Lead role	
2000	Seance	Sato	Lead role; TV movie	
2010	Wagaya no Rekishi	Narrator	Miniseries	
2011	Early Autumn	Shinpei Matsubara	Lead role; TV movie	
2014	Fathers	Sōsuke Aoki	Lead role; episode 2	
2017	Ties: A Miraculous Colt	Masayuki	Lead role; miniseries	
2017	Rikuoh	Kōichi Miyazawa	Lead role	
2017	The Supporting Actors	Himself	Episode 1	
2019	Idaten	Kanō Jigorō	Taiga drama	
2021	Pension Metsa	Tsuneki	Episode 1	
2021	Matrilineal Family	Yoshizō Yajima	Special appearance; miniseries	
2023	The Days	Masao Yoshida	Lead role	
2023–2026	Vivant	Suguru Nogi / Nogon Beki	2 seasons	
2026	Did Someone Happen to Mention Me?	Gen Takasegawa / Mantaro Yorozu	Lead role	

=== Japanese dub ===
Year	Title	Role	Notes	Ref.
2001	Band of Brothers	Richard Winters	Voice dub for Damian Lewis	
2006	Over the Hedge	RJ	Animation	
2009	Astro Boy	Dr. Bill Tenma	Animation	

== Commercials ==
- Kakaku.com's Kyujin Box (2025–)

== Accolades ==
=== Awards and nominations ===
Organizations (Note: Awards, festivals, honors and other miscellaneous organizations are listed in alphabetical order.)	Year (Note: Indicates the year of ceremony. Each year is linked to the article about the awards held that year, wherever possible.)	Category	Work	Result	Ref.
Agency for Cultural Affairs	1998	Art Encouragement Prizes (Note: On the official website of the Agency for Cultural Affairs definition, "...for New Artists are presented to persons whose outstanding achievements have opened up new vistas in a given year.")	The Eel, Lost Paradise, Bounce Ko Gals, Cure	Won	
Asia Pacific Screen Awards	2017	Best Performance by an Actor	The Third Murder	Nominated	
Asia Pacific Screen Awards	2023	Best Performance	Perfect Days	Nominated	
Asia-Pacific Film Festival	2023	Best Actor in a Leading Role	Perfect Days	Nominated	
Asian Film Awards	2011	Best Actor in a Leading Role	13 Assassins	Nominated	
Asian Film Awards	2012	Best Actor in a Leading Role	Chronicle of My Mother	Nominated	
Asian Film Awards	2019	Best Actor in a Leading Role	The Blood of Wolves	Won	
Asian Film Awards	2019	Excellence In Asian Cinema Award (Note: Per Tokyo International Film Festival, "The Excellence in Asian Cinema Award aims to highlight distinguished talents and affirm their achievements and contributions to Asian film industry and culture.")		Honored	
Asian Film Awards	2021	Best Actor in a Leading Role	Under the Open Sky	Nominated	
Asian Film Awards	2024	Best Actor in a Leading Role	Perfect Days	Won	
Asian Film Awards	2025	Lifetime Achievement Award		Honored	
Blue Ribbon Awards	1997	Best Actor	Shall We Dance?, Sleeping Man, Shabu gokudo	Won	
Blue Ribbon Awards	1998	Best Actor	The Eel, Lost Paradise, Cure	Won	
Blue Ribbon Awards	2016	Best Actor	The Emperor in August	Nominated	
Blue Ribbon Awards	2018	Best Supporting Actor	The Third Murder, Sekigahara	Nominated	
Blue Ribbon Awards	2019	Best Actor	The Blood of Wolves	Nominated	
Blue Ribbon Awards	2022	Best Actor	Under the Open Sky	Nominated	
Blue Ribbon Awards	2024	Best Actor	Perfect Days	Nominated	
Cannes Film Festival	2023	Best Actor	Perfect Days	Won	
Chicago International Film Festival	2001	Silver Hugo – Best Actor	Warm Water Under a Red Bridge	Won	
Chicago International Film Festival	2020	Silver Hugo – Best Performance	Under the Open Sky	Won	
Chlotrudis Award	1998	Best Actor	Shall We Dance?	Nominated	
Critics' Choice Movie Awards	2007	Best Acting Ensemble	Babel	Nominated	
Deauville Asian Film Festival	2008	Tribute		Won	
Dubai International Film Festival	2011	Muhr AsiaAfrica Feature – Best Actor	The Woodsman and the Rain	Won	
Elan d'or Awards	1984	Newcomer of the Year		Won	
Gold Derby Awards	2007	Best Ensemble Cast	Babel	Nominated	
Gotham Awards	2006	Best Ensemble Cast	Babel	Won	
GQ Japan	2021	Men of the Year Best Actor		Won	
Hawaii International Film Festival	2012	Career Achievement Award (Note: Per Hawaii International Film Festival, "The HIFF Golden Maile Award for Career Achievement is bestowed to an artist who has reached the career pinnacles very few have achieved via industry awards and accolades and a body of work that is known globally.")		Honored	
Hochi Film Award	1996	Best Actor	Shall We Dance?, Sleeping Man, Shabu gokudo	Won	
Hochi Film Award	1997	Best Actor	The Eel, Lost Paradise, Bounce Ko Gals	Won	
Hochi Film Award	2017	Best Supporting Actor	The Third Murder, Sekigahara	Won	
Hochi Film Award	2018	Best Actor	The Blood of Wolves	Won	
Hochi Film Award	2021	Best Actor	Under the Open Sky	Nominated	
Japan Academy Film Prize	1991	Best Actor in a Leading Role	Pod severnym siyaniyem	Nominated	
Japan Academy Film Prize	1997	Best Actor in a Leading Role	Shall We Dance?	Won	
Japan Academy Film Prize	1998	Best Actor in a Leading Role	The Eel	Won	
Japan Academy Film Prize	1999	Best Actor in a Leading Role	Kizuna	Nominated	
Japan Academy Film Prize	2000	Best Actor in a Leading Role	Spellbound	Nominated	
Japan Academy Film Prize	2001	Best Actor in a Leading Role	Dora-heita	Nominated	
Japan Academy Film Prize	2002	Best Actor in a Leading Role	Warm Water Under a Red Bridge	Nominated	
Japan Academy Film Prize	2003	Best Actor in a Leading Role	The Choice of Hercules	Nominated	
Japan Academy Film Prize	2005	Best Actor in a Leading Role	University of Laughs	Nominated	
Japan Academy Film Prize	2007	Best Actor in a Leading Role	The Uchōten Hotel	Nominated	
Japan Academy Film Prize	2008	Best Actor in a Leading Role	Walking My Life	Nominated	
Japan Academy Film Prize	2009	Best Actor in a Leading Role	Paco and the Magical Book	Nominated	
Japan Academy Film Prize	2011	Best Actor in a Leading Role	13 Assassins	Nominated	
Japan Academy Film Prize	2012	Best Actor in a Leading Role	The Last Ronin	Nominated	
Japan Academy Film Prize	2013	Best Actor in a Leading Role	Chronicle of My Mother	Nominated	
Japan Academy Film Prize	2013	Best Actor in a Leading Role	Isoroku	Nominated	
Japan Academy Film Prize	2015	Best Actor in a Leading Role	A Samurai Chronicle	Nominated	
Japan Academy Film Prize	2016	Best Actor in a Leading Role	The Emperor in August	Nominated	
Japan Academy Film Prize	2018	Best Actor in a Supporting Role	The Third Murder	Won	
Japan Academy Film Prize	2018	Best Actor in a Supporting Role	Sekigahara	Nominated	
Japan Academy Film Prize	2019	Best Actor in a Leading Role	The Blood of Wolves	Won	
Japan Academy Film Prize	2022	Best Actor in a Leading Role	Under the Open Sky	Nominated	
Japan Academy Film Prize	2024	Best Actor in a Leading Role	Perfect Days	Won	
Japan Cuts	2012	Excellence in Film (Note: Reporting from Movie Walker Press, "Cut Above Award for Excellent in Film, which was established to honor the contributions made to the film industry over the years.")		Honored	
Japanese Movie Critics Awards	1996	Best Actor	Shall We Dance?, Sleeping Man, Shabu gokudo	Won	
Kinema Junpo Awards	1997	Best Actor	Shall We Dance?	Won	
Kinema Junpo Awards	1998	Best Actor	The Eel, Lost Paradise	Won	
Kinema Junpo Awards	2022	Best Actor	Under the Open Sky	Won	
Kinema Junpo Awards	2024	Best Actor	Perfect Days, Familia and Father of the Milky Way Railroad	Won	
Kyoto International Film and Art Festival	2014	Toshiro Mifune Award (Note: Kyoto International Film and Art Festival describes the award, "The Toshiro Mifune Award... honors an actor who has great potential for international success.")		Honored	
Mainichi Film Awards	1996	Best Actor	Kamikaze Taxi	Won	
Mainichi Film Awards	1997	Best Actor	Shall We Dance?, Sleeping Man, Shabu gokudo	Won	
Mainichi Film Awards	2018	Best Supporting Actor	The Third Murder	Won	
Mainichi Film Awards	2019	Best Actor	The Blood of Wolves	Nominated	
Mainichi Film Awards	2022	Best Actor	Under the Open Sky	Nominated	
Monte-Carlo Television Festival	2013	Golden Nymph for Outstanding Actors	Early Autumn	Nominated	
Nikkan Sports Film Award	1996	Best Actor	Shall We Dance?	Won	
Nikkan Sports Film Award	2017	Best Supporting Actor	The Third Murder, Sekigahara	Won	
Nikkan Sports Film Award	2018	Best Actor	The Blood of Wolves	Nominated	
Nikkan Sports Film Award	2024	Best Actor	Perfect Days, Hakkenden: Fiction and Reality	Nominated	
Nippon Connection	2017	Nippon Honor Award (Note: Quoted verbatim from the 22nd Nippon Connection Film Festival, "The award... honors outstanding personalities for their merits in the Japanese film industry.")		Honored	
Osaka Cinema Festival	2019	Best Actor	The Blood of Wolves	Won	
Palm Springs International Film Festival	2007	Best Ensemble Cast	Babel	Won	
San Diego Film Critics Society	2006	Best Ensemble	Babel	Won	
Screen Actors Guild Awards	2007	Outstanding Performance by a Cast in a Motion Picture	Babel	Nominated	
Singapore International Film Festival	2017	Cinema Legend Award (Note: Singapore International Film Festival wrote, "The Cinema Legend Award is awarded to a luminary Asian actor who has made an indelible mark with his/her performance, celebrating outstanding achievements in bringing Asia’s story to life on screen.")		Honored	
Sitges Film Festival	2014	Best Actor	The World of Kanako	Won	
Tama Film Awards	2012	Best Actor	Isoroku, Chronicle of My Mother, The Woodsman and the Rain	Won	
Tama Film Awards	2021	Best Actor	Under the Open Sky, The Supporting Actors, Belle	Won	
The Men's Fashion Unity	2007	Best Dresser Award		Won	
Tokyo International Film Festival	1997	Best Actor	Cure	Won	
Tokyo Sports Film Awards	2018	Best Supporting Actor	The Third Murder	Nominated	
Tokyo Sports Film Awards	2019	Best Actor	The Blood of Wolves	Nominated	
Yokohama Film Festival	1997	Best Actor	Shall We Dance?, Sleeping Man, Shabu gokudo	Won	
Yokohama Film Festival	2005	Best Actor	University of Laughs, Yudan Taiteki, Tokyo Genpatsu	Won	
Yokohama Film Festival	2019	Best Actor	The Blood of Wolves	Won	
Yokohama Film Festival	2025	Best Actor	Perfect Days and Hakkenden: Fiction and Reality	Won	
Zenkoku Eiren Awards	1997	Best Actor	Shall We Dance?	Won	
Zenkoku Eiren Awards	2013	Best Actor	Chronicle of My Mother	Won	
Zenkoku Eiren Awards	2018	Best Supporting Actor	The Third Murder	Won	
Zenkoku Eiren Awards	2022	Best Actor	Under the Open Sky	Won	

=== State honors ===
Country	Year	Honor	Ref.
Japan	2012	Medal with Purple Ribbon	
