= Akiko Ōku =

Japanese film director (born 1968)

- 大九 明子
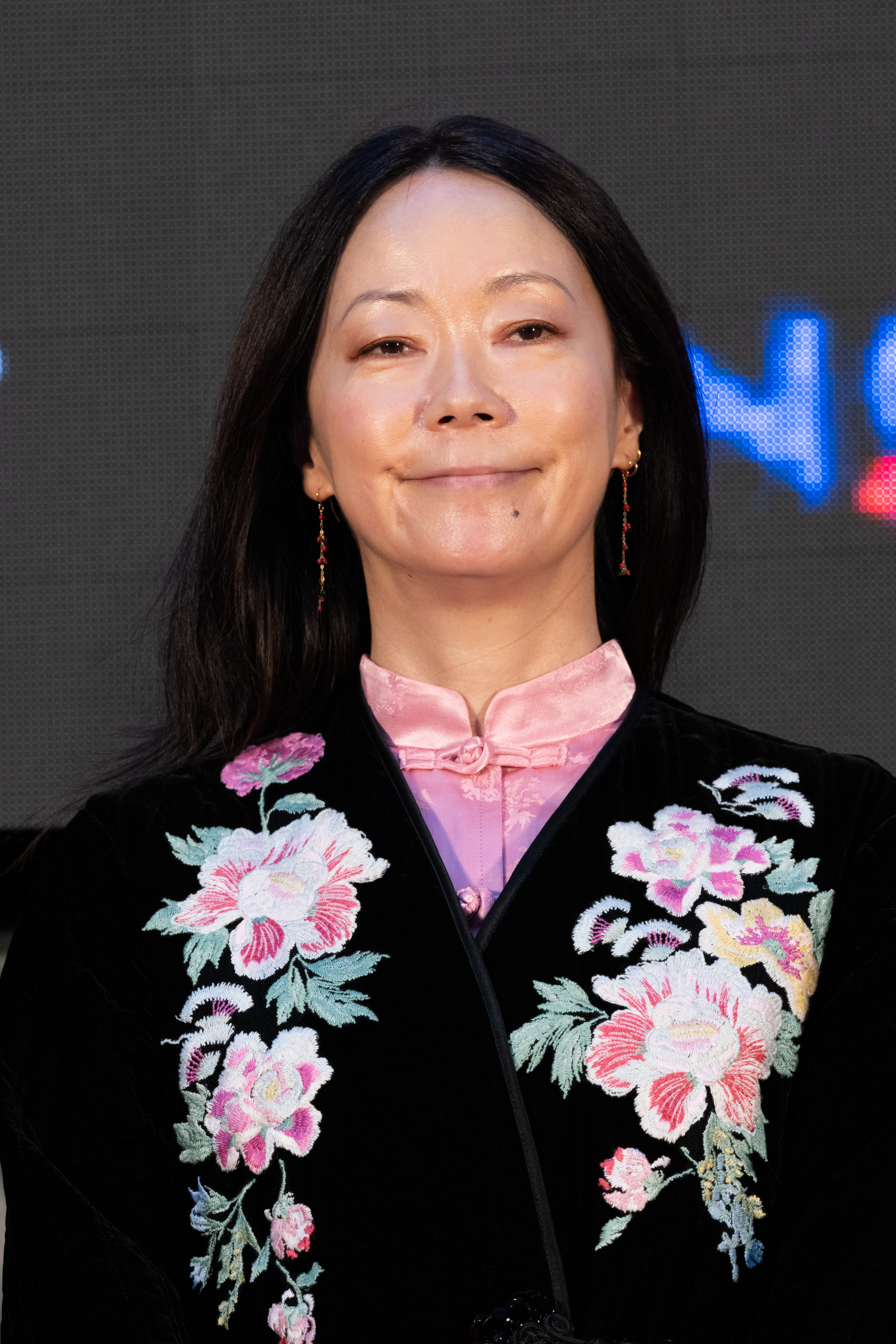
- Ohku at the opening ceremony of the Tokyo International Film Festival in 2024
- Born: October 8, 1968 (age 58); Yokohama, Kanagawa Prefecture, Japan
- Education: Meiji University (Political Science)
- Occupations: Film director; screenwriter
- Years active: 1999–present
- Website: https://www.sarutohebi.com/

Akiko Ōku (大九 明子, Ōku Akiko; born October 8, 1968), also romanised as Akiko Ohku, is a Japanese film director and screenwriter. Ōku's best-known film to date is her 2017 romantic comedy Tremble All You Want. She won two Audience Awards, and was nominated for several Best Film awards at Tokyo International Film Festival and Nippon Connection Japanese film festival.

== Career ==
Ōku was born in Yokohama, Kanagawa. In high school, she joined a rakugo group. While studying Politics and Economics at Meiji University, she was part of a student theatre troupe. After graduating, Ōku briefly had an office job at a subsidiary of the Ministry of Labour. She then entered a comedy acting school for one year and performed as a stand-up comedian, and afterwards, at age 27, she entered Eigabi School, a film school where director Kiyoshi Kurosawa taught, among others.

=== Igaito shinanai (1999) ===
While still at film school, Ōku won a screenwriting contest with a script that would become her theatrical feature film debut as director, 意外と死なない (Igaito shinanai, literally "don't die unexpectedly"). The film was released in 1999. It is about an elementary school teacher troubled by pupils, parents, colleagues and a stalker.

=== Lost After School (2014) ===
Lost After School (original title 放課後ロスト Hōkago rosuto) is an anthology film released in 2014 consisting of three episodes about high school girls. The film is based on the shōjo manga World Gaze Clips by Ran Igarashi. Each episode was directed by a different female director, the other directors besides Ōku being Chihiro Amano and Ai Nagura. Ōku's segment is titled 倍音 (baion, literally "overtones").

=== Fantastic Girls (2015) ===
Fantastic Girls (original title でーれーガールズ Dērē gāruzu) was released in 2015. It is adapted from the novel of the same title by Maha Harada. The word dērē in the title is Okayama dialect and means "very". The story is about two high-school friends in 1980 who reunite 30 years later.

=== Tremble All You Want (2017) ===
勝手にふるえてろ (Katte ni furuetero) is a romantic comedy released in 2017. It won the Audience Award at the 30th Tokyo International Film Festival, and its leading actress Mayu Matsuoka was nominated for a Japan Academy Film Prize.

== Filmography ==
- 2007: Tokyo Serendipity
- 2012: Tokyo Nameless Girl's Story
- 2013: Monster
- 2015: Fantastic Girls (based on the novel by Maha Harada)
- 2017: Tremble All You Want (based on the novel by Risa Wataya)
- 2018: Marriage Hunting Beauty (based on the manga by Arako Toaru)
- 2019: My Sweet Grappa Remedies
- 2020: Hold Me Back (based on the novel by Risa Wataya)
- 2022: Wedding High
- 2024: She Taught Me Serendipity (based on the 2020 debut romance novel The Best Sky Is Yet to Come of Japanese comedian Shūsuke Fukutoku).
- 2027: I Won't Give Up! (based on the novel by Miu Kakuya)
