= Witchriv =

Japanese manga series

- First tankōbon volume cover
- Genre: Dark fantasy
- Manga
- Written by: Hakuri
- Published by: Shueisha
- English publisher: NA: Viz Media
- Imprint: Jump Comics+
- Magazine: Shōnen Jump+
- Original run: October 23, 2025 – present
- Volumes: 4
- icon

Witchriv is a Japanese manga series written and illustrated by Hakuri. It was originally published as a one-shot on Shueisha's Shōnen Jump+ service in July 2025 under the title Meririrarariri, before beginning serialization on the same service in October 2025. Its chapters have been compiled into four volumes as of October 2026.

== Plot ==
Nona Ewin, a mage, lives with her mother Lancia in a town under watch by the Bureau of Magic Surveillance. After visiting her friend Lovi and repairing her glasses, her actions catch the attention of the Bureau. Under threat, Lovi reveals that Nona is a mage, leading to Lovi and her parents being killed. Lancia, who had been hiding her powers herself, escapes with Nona, destroying the town in the process, only for the two to be separated. Nona finds herself locked up in a Bureau base, where she meets Miramira, a fellow captive. The two work together to escape, with Nona looking for Lancia and Miramira searching for her older brother.

== Characters ==
Nona Ewin (ノナ・エウイン, Nona Euin)
The daughter of a mage and a human, she is forced to keep her magic powers a secret as the use of magic is banned. Her father, a human, was killed before she was born, having been the target of the Bureau of Magic Surveillance for having a relationship with a mage. When she and her mother escape after their identities as mages are revealed, she becomes separated. She ends up being kept captive at Base 30, where she encounters Miramira.
Miramira (ミラミラ)
A mage whom Nona meets at Base 30. She had been working there with her older brother after their father's death from a mysterious illness. After he is sent away, Miramira aims to look for him. She was the one who found Nona after she was separated from Lancia, but this also led to Nona being captured and taken to the base.
Lancia (ランシア, Ranshia)
Nona's mother, who ran a flower shop. She had been secretly keeping their identities as mages a secret from the other townspeople. Her husband was killed before Nona's birth, and she promised to protect her. However, after the two escape after their identities were revealed, she becomes separated from Nona.
Lovi (ロヴィ, Rovi)
Nona's best friend. After her glasses were broken, Nona used her magic to repair them. However, this caught the Bureau of Magic Surveillance's attention, leading to Lovi and her family being captured for associating with a mage. After Lovi reveals that Nona is a mage, the Bureau kills her and her family.

== Publication ==
The series is written and illustrated by Hakuri, who previously published a one-shot titled Meririrarariri (メリリララリリ) on Shueisha's Shōnen Jump+ service on July 21, 2024. Meririrarariri revolves around an aspiring witch named Merrily, whose life changes after an encounter with a boy named Danka. It was later revised for serialization, being retitled Witchriv and featuring similarly designed characters but a different story and premise. The series began serialization on Shōnen Jump+ on October 23, 2025, with it receiving a simultaneous English release in Shueisha's Manga Plus service. The first tankōbon volume was released on January 5, 2026. Four volumes have been released as of October 2, 2026.

In June 2026, Viz Media announced that it had licensed the manga for English release in North America, with the first volume set to release in Q2 2027.

=== Volumes ===
No.	Release date	ISBN
1	January 5, 2026	978-4-08-884822-8
2	April 3, 2026	978-4-08-885010-8
3	July 3, 2026	978-4-08-885126-6
4	October 2, 2026	978-4-08-885213-3

== Reception ==
The first volume featured a recommendation from manga artist Kazue Kato. Tulisha Srivastava of ComicBook.com praised the main character and the story, describing its first few chapters as "incredible".

The series was ranked ninth in the web category at the twelfth Next Manga Awards, and also won the U-Next Award for that category.

== See also ==
- One Room of Happiness, another series by the same author
