= Sanbiki ga Kiru! =

- Genre: Jidaigeki
- Starring: Hideki Takahashi; Kōji Yakusho; Shunpūtei Koasa
- Country of origin: Japan
- Original language: Japanese
- No. of seasons: 7
- No. of episodes: 137

Production
- Production company: TV Asahi

Original release
- Network: TV Asahi
- Release: October 22, 1987 – August 31, 1995

Sanbiki ga Kiru! (三匹が斬る!), also known as Three for the Kill! or The Lethal Three, is a group of seven television jidaigeki series broadcast by TV Asahi in Japan. The show aired in the Thursday evening eight o'clock time slot.

== Characters ==
The title characters are three men who wander throughout Japan in the late Edo period. In each episode they encounter antagonists, and in the final tachimawari (fight scene) kill them. The characters traveled sometimes together, sometimes separately. When they arrived in a town they might settle in the same lodging, but sometimes take up with rival factions. In the end, they work together to overcome evil.

For the first five series, these characters were the same.

Yasaka Heishirō, nicknamed "Tono-sama" ("Lord") is a refined, disciplined rōnin played by Hideki Takahashi. The other characters occasionally speculate that he is a second son of a daimyō but his identity is never revealed. He is the informal leader of the group. Yasaka uses the Onoha Ittō-ryū style of sword fighting. He appears in the first six series; at the beginning of the seventh series he is written out of the script by traveling to America.

Kuji Shinnosuke, or "Sengoku," is also a ronin, or a spy for the Tokugawa shogunate, or a commoner, as suits the episode. His nickname refers to his wish to work as a samurai with a stipend of a thousand koku. A native of the Satsuma Domain, Kuji practices the Jigen-ryū sword fighting style. He appears in the first five series and returns in the seventh. Kōji Yakusho played the role of Kuji.

Tsubakuro Jinnai is the third member of the group. Nicknamed "Tako" ("octopus"), he describes himself as a descendant of the Kōga ninja and fights with a variety of weapons. Round-faced rakugo comic Koasa Shunpūtei portrayed Jinnai in all seven series.

The title of the series specifies three people, so a replacement was necessary for Kuji and Yasaka in the final two series. Kira Ukon (Masahiko Kondō, a descendant of Kira Yoshinaka, filled in first for Kuji, then for Yasaka. A debt-collector, he received the nickname "senryō," "a thousand gold pieces," in imitation of Kuji's nickname. During sword fights, he always found an opportunity to ask his opponent his style.

In most series, there was also a woman who accompanied the three. The first was Okei, portrayed by Kaoru Sugita. Next came Osen (Minako Fujishiro); then Ochō (Yōko Nagayama). They were followed by Okaru (Wakako Shimazaki) and finally Oryō (Machi Katsuragi).

== Schedule ==
The first series premiered in 1987, and the seventh ended in 1995. In addition, TV Asahi broadcast another series in 2002 with a new cast and new characters. This series aired on Monday nights.

== Sources ==
This article incorporates information from the article 三匹が斬る! (Sanbiki ga Kiru!) in the Japanese Wikipedia, retrieved September 24, 2007.
