= Unlock Your Heart =

2021 Japanese romantic drama film

- Film poster
- Directed by: Shuto Rin
- Written by: Shuto Rin
- Screenplay by: Shuto Rin
- Based on: Hiraite by Wataya Risa
- Produced by: Sugita Hiromitsu
- Starring: Yamada Anna; Sakuma Ryuto; Imou Haruka
- Cinematography: Iwanaga Hiroshi
- Edited by: Shuto Rin
- Music by: Iwashiro Taro
- Production company: TV Man Union
- Distributed by: Showgate; Amuse Soft
- Release date: 22 October 2021 (Japan)
- Running time: 121 minutes
- Country: Japan
- Language: Japanese

- This article uses Eastern name order when mentioning individuals.

Unlock Your Heart (Japanese: ひらいて, Hepburn: Hiraite; lit. 'Open') is a 2021 Japanese romantic drama film directed by Shuto Rin and starring Yamada Anna, Sakuma Ryuto and Imou Haruka. It is based on Wataya Risa's novel of the same title.

== Production and release ==
The film was produced by TV Man Union.

It was first released in theaters on 22 October 2021, being distributed by Showgate, and the DVD & Blu-ray were released on 13 April 2022, distributed by Amuse.

== Plot ==
Ai is a third-year high school student who is very popular and diligent. She seems to have it all, but can't get the attention of Tatoe, a classmate she has had a crush on since her first year of high school due to his mysterious personality. One day, she happens to see Tatoe reading a letter and later finds out that another classmate, Miyuki, is the one who sent it, discovering that the two are in a secret relationship. Ai decides to become close to Miyuki while hiding her feelings for Tatoe.

== Cast ==
=== Main ===
- Yamada Anna as Kimura Ai
- Sakuma Ryuto as Nishimura Tatoe
- Imou Haruka as Shindo Miyuki

=== Supporting ===
- Itaya Yuka as Kimura Yoriko
- Tanaka Misako as Shindo Izumi
- Hagiwara Masato as Nishimura Takashi
- Yamamoto Hiroshi as homeroom teacher Okanoya
- Kawai Aoba as teacher Fujitani
- Kinoshita Akari as school nurse Moriya
- Suzuki Miu as Takeuchi Mika
- Tanaka Taketo as Tada Ken

== Accolades ==
Award	Category	Nominee(s)	Result	Ref
22nd Nippon Connection	Nippon Visions Jury Award	Unlock Your Heart	Won	
