= Anna Yamada =

Japanese actress (born 2001)

- 山田 杏奈
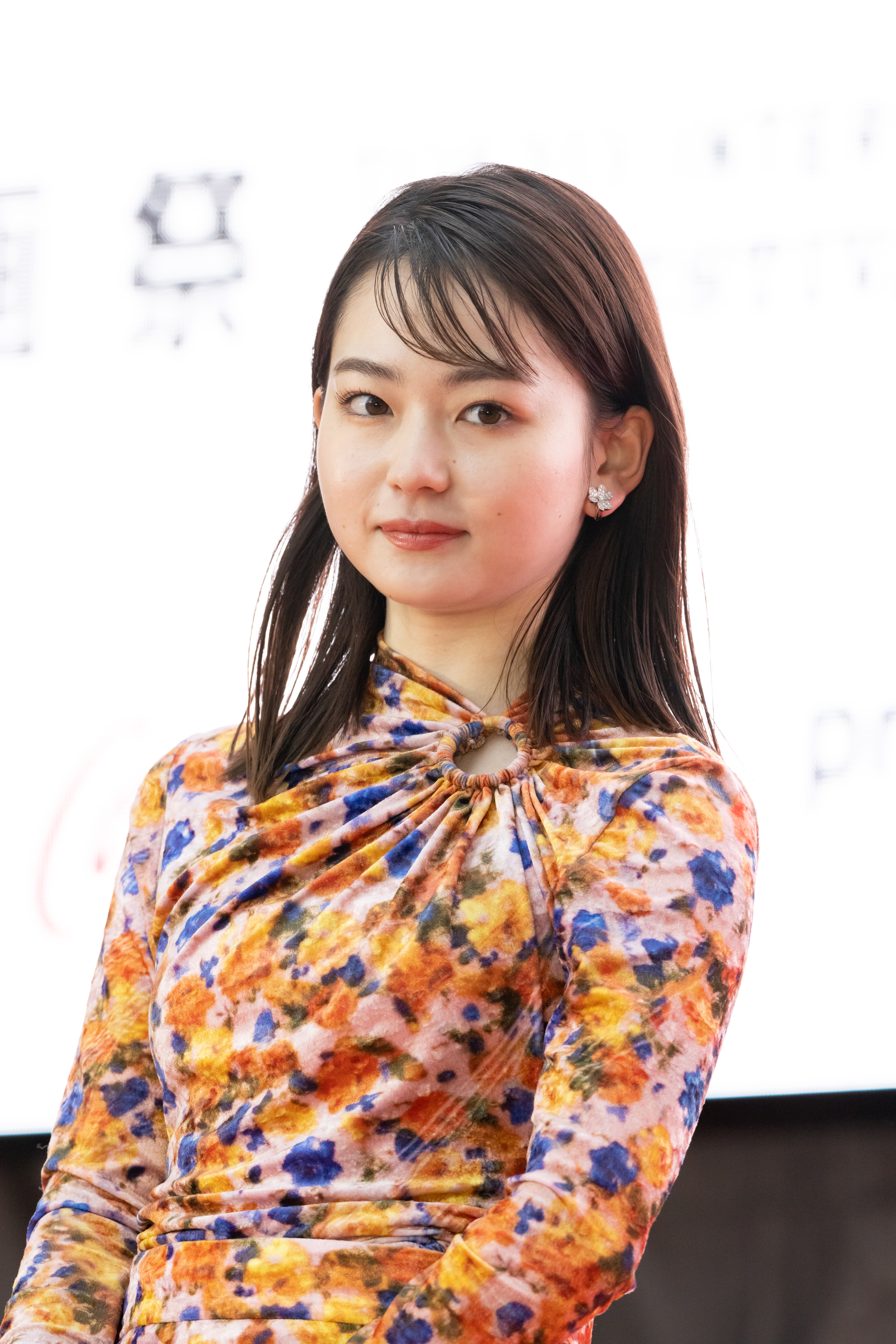
- Yamada at the Tokyo International Film Festival in 2022
- Born: January 8, 2001 (age 25); Saitama Prefecture, Japan
- Occupation: Actress
- Years active: 2011–present
- Agent: Amuse Inc.
- Website: www.amuse.co.jp/artist/A8357/

Signature
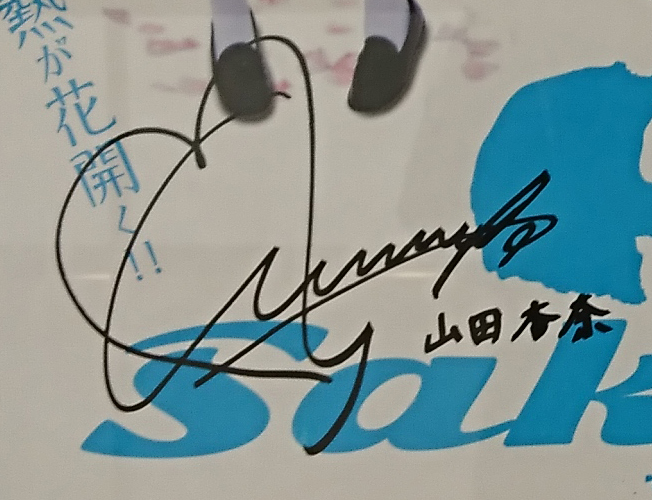

Anna Yamada (山田 杏奈, Yamada Anna; born January 8, 2001) is a Japanese actress represented by Amuse.

== Career ==
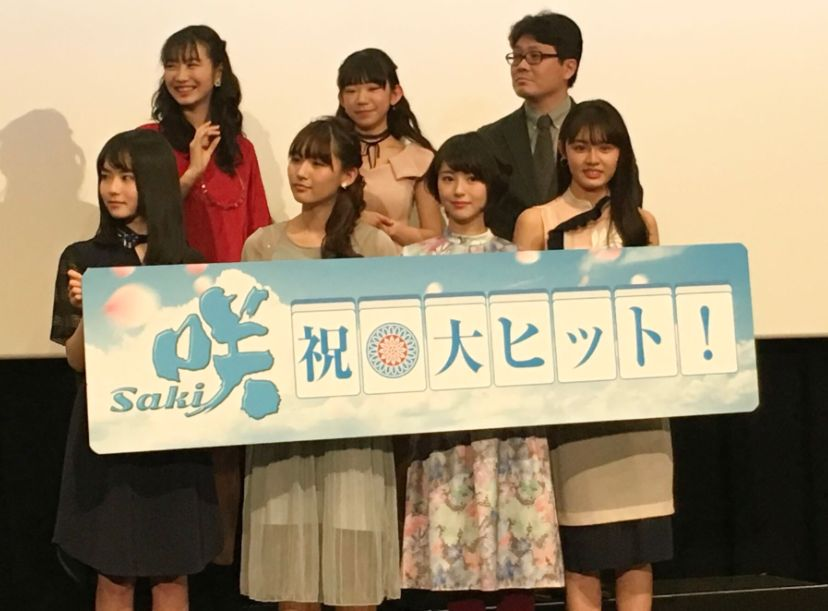
The event for the movie Saki (2017). In the front row, Yamada is on the left, and Minami Hamabe is the second from the right.

In 2011, Yamada won the Grand Prix at Ciao Girl 2011 Audition, and joined the talent agency Amuse Inc. She attended the audition because she wanted the Nintendo 3DS, which was the prize of the Grand Prix. Since then, she has been active as a model for the magazine Ciao.

In 2013, she played the role of Emi Natsume in Keiji no Manazashi, which was broadcast on TBS, and made her first appearance in a TV drama. In the comic JS・JC Moderu Monogatari published in the same year, the story of how she became active as a Ciao Girl was written by Mea Sakisaka and published under the title of Fairy Smile ~ Anna Yamada Monogatari ~.

In 2015, Yamada starred as Yui in the live-action drama of Nao Maita's original manga Age 12.

She made her first appearance in the movie Too Young to Die! released in 2016.

In the January 23, 2017, issue of Weekly Playboy, released in 2017, she was featured as one of the eight "Sugokawa 2017".

She starred in the movie Liverleaf, released in 2018. The same year, she starred in the TV drama Sachiiro no One Room.

She released her first photo book in 2019. The same year, she won the Best Newcomer Award at the 41st Yokohama Film Festival for her performance in her movie Chiisana Koi no Uta.

In 2020, she participated in the #SaveWithStories project by Save the Children by storytelling the picture book Tebukuro wo Kaini. In December of the same year, she released her first calendar.

In 2021, she ranked 3rd in the Next Break Female Talent BEST 10 by Talent Power Ranking. In March of the same year, she participated in the photo exhibition Vol.3 of Watashi no Toritakatta Joyū-ten under the nomination of photographer Takahiro Sakai.

== Filmography ==
=== Film ===
Year	Title	Role	Notes	Ref.
2012	Detective Conan: The Eleventh Striker	Unnamed role	Voice extra	
2016	Too Young to Die!	Manami		
2017	Saki	Mako Someya		
2017	Wilderness Part One	Mari		
2018	Leading Roles	Chisato Sakai		
2018	Liverleaf	Haruka Nozaki	Lead role	
2018	Missions of Love	Mami Mizuno		
2019	21st Century Girl	Kiku	Lead role; anthology film	
2019	Little Love Song	Mai Fukumura		
2019	5 Million Dollar Life	Asuka Tachibana		
2019	Murders at the House of Death	Mifuyu Shizuhara		
2020	Georama Boy, Panorama Girl	Haruko Shibuya	Lead role	
2021	The Master Plan	Yocchi		
2021	The Cinderella Addiction	Chinatsu Fukuura		
2021	Suicide Forest Village	Hibiki Amazawa	Lead role	
2021	Unlock Your Heart	Ai Kimura	Lead role	
2021	What She Likes...	Sae Miura		
2022	Homestay	Akira Fujieda		
2023	Mountain Woman	Rin	Lead role; American-Japanese film	
2024	Golden Kamuy	Asirpa		
2024	Faceless	Mai Sakai		
2025	As for Me	Maiko Honda		
2025	ChaO	ChaO (voice)	Lead role	
2025	The Sickness Unto Love	Kei Yosuga	Lead role	
2026	New Group	Ai	Lead role	
2026	Golden Kamuy: The Abashiri Prison Raid	Asirpa		
2027	Super Mob Ninja	Ion Mimura		

=== Television drama ===
Year	Title	Role	Notes	Ref.
2013	The Detective's Gaze	Emi Natsume		
2015	Burning Flower	Hisa's friend	Episode 1; Taiga drama	
2015	Wasurenai... ni i-chan no randoseru	Hide Yonezu		
2016	Sumika Sumire	Tomoka Kurihara	Episode 7	
2016	Tales of the Unusual: Autumn 2016	Aya	Short drama	
2016	Saki	Mako Someya		
2018	Missions of Love	Mami Mizuno		
2018	A Little Room for Hope	Sachi	Lead role	
2019	Let's Have a Meal Together	Sachi	Lead role	
2019	Tales of the Unusual: Rain 2019	15-year-old Nozomi Haruta	Short drama	
2020	The Secrets	Hitomi Shirakawa		
2020	O Maidens in Your Savage Season	Kazusa Onodera	Lead role	
2022	Blue Box Briefing	Sappūkei	Lead role; mini-series	
2022	Teen Regime	Sachi Sagawa	Mini-series	
2022	10 Count to the Future	Akari Mizuno		
2022	New Nobunaga Chronicle: High School Is a Battlefield	Miyabi Kusakabe		
2022	Uzukawamura Jiken	Misaki	Mini-series	
2023	Tax Solver	Hanako Dōmeki		
2024–27	Golden Kamuy: The Hunt of Prisoners in Hokkaido / Karafuto Pursuit Arc	Asirpa	2 seasons	
2025	Our Happy Family	Misuzu Yoshioka	Television film	
2025	Synanthrope	Kotomi Mizumachi		
2025–26	In Lilac Bloom, The Path to a Veterinarian	Satori Kishimoto	Lead role; 2 seasons	
2026	Lost and Found	Yuka Uchida	Lead role; Singaporean-Japanese drama	
2026	Hakone Ekiden: Our Story	Chika Toyama		
2026	Zenigata Heiji	Tsubame	Television film	

=== Japanese dub ===
Year	Title	Role	Notes	Ref.
2024	Despicable Me 4	Poppy Prescott		

=== Originals ===
Year	Title	Role	Notes	Ref.
2015	Age 12	Yui Aoi	Lead role	

== Awards and nominations ==
Year	Award	Category	Work(s)	Result	Ref.
2020	41st Yokohama Film Festival	Best Newcomer	Little Love Song	Won	
2021	34th Nikkan Sports Film Awards	Best Newcomer	Unlock Your Heart and the others	Nominated	
2023	Elle Cinema Awards 2023	ElleGirl Rising Star	Mountain Woman	Won	
2024	37th Nikkan Sports Film Awards	Best Supporting Actress	Golden Kamuy and Faceless	Won	
2025	67th Blue Ribbon Awards	Best Supporting Actress	Golden Kamuy and Faceless	Nominated	
2025	48th Japan Academy Film Prize	Best Supporting Actress	Faceless	Nominated	
2025	48th Japan Academy Film Prize	Newcomer of the Year	Faceless and Golden Kamuy	Won	
2026	26th Nippon Connection	Nippon Rising Star Award	Herself	Won	
