= One Room of Happiness =

Japanese manga series written and illustrated by Hakuri

- First volume cover

幸色のワンルーム (Sachiiro no Wan Rūmu)
- Manga
- Written by: Hakuri
- Published by: Square Enix
- English publisher: Crunchyroll
- Imprint: Gangan Comics Pixiv
- Original run: 22 February 2017 – 21 December 2022
- Volumes: 11
- Television drama
- Directed by: Ryûichi Honda, Kyōhei Tamazawa
- Original network: TV Asahi
- Original run: 8 July 2018 – 23 September 2018
- Episodes: 10

One Room of Happiness (幸色のワンルーム, Sachiiro no One Room; transl. "Happiness-colored One Room") is a Japanese manga series written and illustrated by Hakuri. The manga was first published in Square Enix and Pixiv's web manga magazine Gangan Pixiv since February 22, 2017, and reached more than 75 million viewers as of June 2017. A television drama adaptation starring Anna Yamada and Shūhei Uesugi premiered on TV Asahi July 8, 2018. The official English title of the drama adaptation is A Little Room for Hope.

== Plot ==
An unnamed 14-year-old girl who is physically abused by her parents, sexually abused by her teacher, and bullied by her classmates decides to commit suicide, but is stopped by an unnamed man who always wears a mask. She decides to run away to live with the man and begins calling him "Mister." He gives her the name Sachi, meaning happiness. The police treat her disappearance as a kidnapping, and begin searching for the two. They make a pact that if they can escape from the police they will get married, but if they get caught they will end their life.

== Characters ==
Mister (お兄さん, Onii-san)
Portrayed by: Shuhei Uesugi
This character whose name and age are unknown is a man who always covers his face with a mask, and is notable for his silver-colored hair. He first appears as Sachi's "stalker"—he took a lot of pictures of her and put them on a wall at his home. After saving Sachi from committing suicide, he decided to give Sachi a chance to "taste happiness" while doubting whether what he does—kidnapping her—is the right thing to do. He reveals in chapter 43 that he was once called Haru.
Sachi (幸)
Portrayed by: Inori Minase (TVCM), Anna Yamada (TV series)
Sachi is a beautiful 14-year-old victim of her abusive parents and was bullied by her classmates at school. Sick of her own life, she decides to end it before the "older brother" saved her life. Her current name is given by the "Mister," and the kanji of her name comes from the word "happiness," which Sachi always adored.

== Media ==
=== Manga ===
11 compilation volumes have been released. The series concluded with its 11th installment in December 2022. Crunchyroll licensed the manga for English publication.

==== Volumes ====
No.	Japanese release date	Japanese ISBN
1	22 February 2017	978-4757552647
2	22 July 2017	978-4757554108
3	22 November 2017	978-4757555266
4	22 March 2018	978-4757556614
5	21 September 2018	978-4757558496
6	22 February 2019	978-4757560154
7	21 September 2019	978-4757562219
8	22 June 2020	978-4757566712
9	21 May 2021	978-4757572621
10	20 May 2022	—
11	21 December 2022	—

=== Television drama ===
A live-action drama adaptation started broadcasting on July 8, 2018, in TV Asahi. The drama starred Anna Yamada and Shuhei Uesugi as Sachi and "Older brother" respectively. It is the second work to be aired in TV Asahi's "Drama L" slot. Five-piece band Flow performs the theme song titled "Neiro" (音色; transl. "Sound-colored")

== Reception ==
In 2017, the series won third place in Pixiv and Nippon Shuppan Hanbai, Inc's Web Manga General Election.

== See also ==
- Witchriv, another series by the same author
