= Misako Tanaka =

Japanese actress

- Born: November 11, 1959 (age 65); Oki District, Shimane Prefecture, Japan
- Occupation: Actress
- Years active: 1981–present
- Spouse: Kuniyuki Fukasawa (m. 1995; div. 2023)
- Children: 1

Misako Tanaka (田中美佐子, Tanaka Misako), née Misako Fukazawa (深沢美佐子, Fukazawa Misako; born 11 November 1959), is a Japanese actress from Oki District, Shimane Prefecture, Japan.

In 1995, she married comedian Kuniyuki Fukasawa. The couple divorced in June 2023 after 28 years of their marriage.

== Filmography ==
=== Film ===
- What Did You Eat Yesterday? (2021)
- Unlock Your Heart (2021), Izumi Shindo
- Riverside Mukolitta (2022)

=== Television ===
- Tokugawa Ieyasu (1983), Tokuhime
- What Did You Eat Yesterday? (2019–23)
