= Warm Water Under a Red Bridge =

2001 film

- Warm Water Under a Red Bridge (2001)
- Directed by: Shōhei Imamura
- Written by: Yo Henmi (novel); Shōhei Imamura; Daisuke Tengan; Motofumi Tomikawa (screenplay)
- Produced by: Masaya Nakamura
- Starring: Kōji Yakusho; Misa Shimizu; Mitsuko Baisho; Mansaku Fuwa; Isao Natsuyagi; Yukiya Kitamura; Hijiri Kojima
- Cinematography: Shigeru Komatsubara
- Edited by: Hajime Okayasu
- Music by: Shin’ichirō Ikebe
- Distributed by: Nikkatsu Corporation
- Release date: November 3, 2001 (Japan)
- Running time: 122 minutes (Argentina); 119 minutes (France)
- Language: Japanese

Warm Water Under a Red Bridge (赤い橋の下のぬるい水, Akai Hashi no Shita no Nurui Mizu) is a 2001 Japanese romantic comedy film by director Shōhei Imamura. This was Imamura's last feature film. It was entered into the 2001 Cannes Film Festival. Warm Water Under A Red Bridge focuses on the troubles of a Japanese "everyman" who finds a new life with an unusual woman in a small fishing village. Imamura's last film contains considerable commentary on the search for happiness.

== Plot ==
Yosuke is a salaryman who has been laid off from his job at an architectural firm in Tokyo and is undergoing marital difficulties. When his old friend dies, he travels to the small fishing town of Himi, Toyama to find a treasure that the old man had hidden in a house there decades before. He does not find what he expects, but takes a job with local fishermen and becomes romantically involved with a woman with an exaggerated proclivity towards female ejaculation.

== Cast ==
- Kōji Yakusho as Yosuke Sasano
- Misa Shimizu as Saeko Aizawa
- Mitsuko Baisho as Mitsu Aizawa
- Mansaku Fuwa as Gen
- Isao Natsuyagi as Masayuki Uomi
- Yukiya Kitamura as Shintaro Uomi
- Hijiri Kojima as Mika Tagami
- Toshie Negishi as Tomoko Sasano
- Sumiko Sakamoto as Masako Yamada
- Gadarukanaru Taka as Taizo Tachibana
- Mickey Curtis as Nobuyuki Ohnishi
- Takao Yamada as Kazuo Namamura
- Katsuo Nakamura as Takao Yamada
- Kazuo Kitamura as Taro
