= Shinmai Shimai no Futari Gohan =

Japanese manga series

- First tankōbon volume cover

新米姉妹のふたりごはん
- Genre: Gourmet
- Manga
- Written by: Yutaka Hiiragi
- Published by: ASCII Media Works
- Imprint: Dengeki Comics NEXT
- Magazine: Dengeki Daioh
- Original run: June 27, 2015 – present
- Volumes: 12
- Television drama
- Directed by: Kentarō Moriya; Hiroaki Yuasa; Kenji Kuwajima
- Written by: Erika Seki; Yūki Imanishi; Hikaru Sōma
- Music by: Taro Makito
- Studio: TV Tokyo; ADK Creative One
- Original network: TXN (TV Tokyo)
- Original run: October 10, 2019 – December 27, 2019
- Episodes: 12

Shinmai Shimai no Futari Gohan (新米姉妹のふたりごはん) is a Japanese manga series written and illustrated by Yutaka Hiiragi. It began serialization in ASCII Media Works' Dengeki Daioh manga magazine in June 2015. A live-action television drama adaptation aired from October to December 2019.

== Synopsis ==
The series is centered around stepsisters Sachi Mizutani and Ayari Tsukishiro. Sachi's father gets remarried and as a result gets a younger stepsister in Ayari. They initially do not get along due to their contrasting personalities, but later they find common ground due to their love of food.

== Characters ==
Sachi Mizutani (水谷 サチ, Mizutani Sachi)
Portrayed by: Anna Yamada
Ayari Tsukishiro (月城 あやり, Tsukishiro Ayari)
Portrayed by: Karen Otomo
Eri Ueda (上田 絵梨, Ueda Eri)
Minori (みのり)
Nao Shinoda (篠田 なお, Shinoda Nao)
Toru Mizutani (水谷 透, Mizutani Toru)

== Media ==
=== Manga ===
Written and illustrated by Yutaka Hiiragi, Shinmai Shimai Futari Gohan began serialization in ASCII Media Works' Dengeki Daioh magazine on June 27, 2015. Its chapters have been collected into twelve tankōbon volumes as of June 2026.

No.	Release date	ISBN
1	December 19, 2015	978-4-04-865653-5
2	July 27, 2016	978-4-04-865997-0
3	February 27, 2017	978-4-04-892716-1
4	August 26, 2017	978-4-04-893242-4
5	March 24, 2018	978-4-04-893716-0
6	January 25, 2019	978-4-04-912292-3
7	October 26, 2019	978-4-04-912836-9
8	August 27, 2020	978-4-04-913389-9
9	June 25, 2021	978-4-04-913857-3
10	May 27, 2022	978-4-04-913389-9
11	February 27, 2025	978-4-04-916246-2
12	June 26, 2026	978-4-04-952290-7

=== Drama ===
A live-action television drama adaptation aired on TV Tokyo's "MokuDra 25" programming block from October 10 to December 27, 2019. It featured Anna Yamada and Karen Otomo as the lead characters Sachi and Ayari respectively.

== Reception ==
By February 2025, the series had over 1.5 million copies in circulation.

The series was ranked ninth in the print category at the third Next Manga Awards in 2017.
