= Yukiko Okamoto (actress) =

Japanese actress (born 1979)

- Born: 5 May 1979 (age 47)
- Occupation: actress

Okamoto Yukiko (岡元夕紀子, Okamoto Yukiko; born 5 May 1979 in Kanagawa Prefecture) is a Japanese actress. She was given a Best New Talent award at the 1998 Yokohama Film Festival.
