= The Woodsman and the Rain =

- Film poster
- Kanji: キツツキと雨
- Revised Hepburn: Kitsutsuki to Ame
- Directed by: Shuichi Okita
- Written by: Fumio Moriya; Shuichi Okita
- Produced by: Miyuki Sato; Shirō Sasaki; Tadaatsu Shundo; Satoshi Arashi; Ujikatsu Omori
- Starring: Kōji Yakusho; Shun Oguri; Kengo Kora; Kyūsaku Shimada; Mitsuru Hirata; Masatō Ibu; Tsutomu Yamazaki
- Cinematography: Yuta Tsukinaga
- Edited by: Takashi Sato
- Music by: Omu-Tone; Gen Hoshino
- Distributed by: Kadokawa Pictures
- Release dates: October 23, 2011 (Tokyo); February 11, 2012 (Japan)
- Running time: 129 minutes
- Country: Japan
- Language: Japanese

The Woodsman and the Rain (Japanese: キツツキと雨, Hepburn: Kitsutsuki to Ame) is a 2011 Japanese comedy film co-written and directed by Shuichi Okita, about a lumberjack involved in the shooting of a zombie movie.

Following its premiere at the 2011 Tokyo International Film Festival, where it won the Special Jury Prize, The Woodsman and the Rain was released in Japanese theaters on February 11, 2012.

== Plot ==
Living in deep countryside Katsuhiko Kishi works as lumberjack at a local company. His wife died almost three years ago and the relationship to his only son Koichi is disturbed, because Koichi doesn't live up to the expectations of Katsuhiko.

One day Katsuhiko meets the young director Koichi Tanabe and the chief of filming crew Mr. Torii and rather reluctantly helps them to find a filming location. He is also asked to play in a zombie walk scene. Next day he is invited to watch the filmed scenes. After the watch he meets the young regisseur in a public bath and gives him a lift to the train station. Koichi Tanabe is surprised about the interest expressed by Kastuhiko towards the movie and leaves him the script book. While Katsuhiko reads the script, Torii and two other crew members arrive at the station and prevent Koichi from escaping to the Tokyo.

Koichi turns up at Katsuhiko's to retrieve the script and they spend some time like father and son, while the own son of Katsuhiko has left for Tokyo.

Next day Koichi has to direct the next scenes, but he feels unable to make any decision about any change initiatives from actors and asks the opinion of Katsuhiko, who is at the filming all day now. Katsuhiko learns that very few actors are available to play anti-zombie-battalion and calls village people to participate. The whole village joins in enthusiastically. Seeing villagers joy Koichi Tanabe smiles the first time and starts to feel more confident as a director. He is even able to deal with an old movie star, which participates in one scene, and earns his recognition as a director.

Excited about movie Katsuhiko skips work and almost forgets about the anniversary of the death of his wife. But relatives arrive and remind him. After the ceremony one of relatives tries to give advice to the son of Katsuhiko in a sharp tone, but Katsuhiko defends his son fiercely and earns the astonished gaze of his son.

Last day of filming the rain disturbs the plan, but with the advice of Katsuhiko they manage to film the very last scene just in time during the break between rain showers.

Villagers go back to they everyday life, the Katsuhiko's son works now with his father, and Koichi Tanabe directs the next film, but he takes a "director's chair" made by Katsuhiko everywhere with him.

== Cast ==
- Kōji Yakusho – Katsuhiko Kishi
- Shun Oguri – Koichi Tanabe
- Tsutomu Yamazaki – old movie star
- Masatō Ibu – Ishimaru
- Kengo Kora – Koichi Kishi
- Asami Usuda
- Kanji Furutachi – Torii
- Kyūsaku Shimada
- Mitsuru Hirata

== Release ==
The Woodsman and the Rain premiered at Tokyo International Film Festival at 23 October 2011 and won Special Jury Prize. It also screened at 2011 Dubai International Film Festival and won prizes for best editor, best actor and best scriptwriter.
