= Sleeping Man (film) =

- Film poster
- Directed by: Kōhei Oguri
- Written by: Kōhei Oguri; Kiyoshi Kenmochi
- Produced by: Hiroshi Fujikura; Kiyoshi Kenmochi
- Starring: Ahn Sung-ki; Christine Hakim; Koji Yakusho; Jun Hamamura; Tokie Hidari
- Cinematography: Osame Maruike
- Edited by: Nobuo Ogawa
- Music by: Toshio Hosokawa
- Production company: Sleeping Man Production Committee
- Distributed by: SPACE
- Release date: 3 February 1996 (Japan)
- Running time: 103 minutes
- Country: Japan
- Language: Japanese

Sleeping Man (Japanese: 眠る男, Hepburn: Nemuru Otoko) is a 1996 Japanese drama film co-written and directed by Kōhei Oguri. The film stars Ahn Sung-ki, Christine Hakim and Koji Yakusho. It was produced by the local government of Gunma Prefecture and shot in Nakanojō. Sleeping Man was released on February 3, 1996, in Japan.

== Premise ==
In a small mountain town, an elderly couple live on a farm where a man named Takuji has been in a coma since suffering an accident. The elderly couple and their neighbors take care of him, while his best friend, Kamimura, talks to the silent, motionless Takuji, as time marches on in their small town.

== Cast ==
- Ahn Sung-ki as Takuji, the Sleeping Man
- Christine Hakim as Tia
- Koji Yakusho as Kamimura
- Jun Hamamura as Old Man at Post Office
- Tokie Hidari as Tomiko
- Masao Imafuku as Takuji's Father
- Ittoku Kishibe as Chief
- Toshie Kobayashi as Middle-Aged Mother-in-Law
- Takahiro Tamura as Denjihei
- Tetsu Watanabe as Daigo
- Akiko Nomura
- Masako Yagi
- Shakti Kapoor

== Awards and nominations ==
20th Montreal World Film Festival

- Won: Special Jury Grand Prize

47th Berlin International Film Festival

- Won: International Federation of Art Theatres Award

38th Mainichi Film Awards

- Won: Excellence Film (shared with Village of Dreams, Gakko II and Kids Return)
- Won: Best Art Direction (Yoshinaga Yokoo)

70th Kinema Junpo Best Ten Awards

- Best Ten List: 3rd place
- Won: Best Japanese Director (Kōhei Oguri)
