= Tokachi Tsuchiya =

- Born: 1973 (age 52–53); Kyoto
- Occupation: Film maker

Tokachi Tsuchiya (土屋 トカチ, Tsuchiya Tokachi) is a film maker. He was born in Kyoto in 1973. In 1997 he began his studies of cinema.

== Film career ==
A Normal Life, Please, his début film, focuses on a cement truck driver and the brutal conditions that he is subjected to by his employers, including inhumanly long working hours and violations of safety and health regulations. The film won several awards including the 2009 Best Documentary in the 17th Raindance Film Festival in London and first prize in the Documentaries category of the Muhr Asia Africa Awards at the 6th Dubai International Film Festival.
