= 35th Japan Academy Film Prize =

Japanese film awards in 2012

- Date: March 2, 2012
- Site: Grand Prince Hotel New Takanawa, Tokyo, Japan
- Hosted by: Tsutomu Sekine; Eri Fukatsu

Highlights
- Most nominations: Rebirth; A Ghost of a Chance; Saigo no Chūshingura

The 35th Japan Academy Film Prize (第35回日本アカデミー賞) is the 35th edition of the Japan Academy Film Prize, an award presented by the Nippon Academy-Sho Association to award excellence in filmmaking. It awarded the best films of 2011 and it took place on March 2, 2012, at the Grand Prince Hotel New Takanawa in Tokyo, Japan.

== Nominees ==
=== Awards ===
Picture of the Year	Animation of the Year
Rebirth; Someday; Saigo no Chūshingura; A Ghost of a Chance; Detective in the Bar	From Up on Poppy Hill; K-On! The Movie!; Buddha; Tōfu-kozō; Detective Conan: Quarter of Silence
Director of the Year	Screenplay of the Year
Izuru Narushima – Rebirth; Junji Sakamoto – Someday; Kaneto Shindo – Postcard; Shigemichi Sugita – Saigo no Chūshingura; Kōki Mitani – A Ghost of a Chance	Satoko Okudera – Rebirth; Haruhiko Arai and Junji Sakamoto – Someday; Yōzō Tanaka – Saigo no Chūshingura; Ryōta Kosawa and Yasushi Sutō – Detective in the Bar; Kōki Mitani – A Ghost of a Chance
Outstanding Performance by an Actor in a Leading Role	Outstanding Performance by an Actress in a Leading Role
Yoshio Harada – Someday; Yo Oizumi – Detective in the Bar; Masato Sakai – Bushi no Kakeibo; Tomokazu Miura – Railways Ai o Tsutaerarenai Otonatachi e; Kōji Yakusho – Saigo no Chūshingura	Mao Inoue – Rebirth; Masami Nagasawa – Moteki; Miki Nakatani – Hankyū Densha; Eri Fukatsu – A Ghost of a Chance; Aoi Miyazaki – Tsure ga Utsu ni Narimashite
Outstanding Performance by an Actor in a Supporting Role	Outstanding Performance by an Actress in a Supporting Role
Denden – Cold Fish; Yūsuke Iseya – Ashita no Joe; Ittoku Kishibe – Someday; Kōichi Satō – Saigo no Chūshingura; Ryuhei Matsuda – Detective in the Bar	Hiromi Nagasaku – Rebirth; Kumiko Asō – Moteki; Eiko Koike – Rebirth; Hikari Mitsushima – Hara-Kiri: Death of a Samurai; Nobuko Miyamoto – Hankyū Densha
Popularity Award	Newcomer of the Year
Atsuko Maeda – Moshidora (Actor Category); Moteki (Production Category)	Sea Kumada – Saya Zamurai; Nanami Sakuraba – Saigo no Chūshingura; Konomi Watanabe – Rebirth; Yusuke Kamiji – Manzai Gang; Kengo Kora – Keibetsu; Takaaki Nomi – Saya Zamurai; Hiroki Hasegawa – Second Virgin
Outstanding Achievement in Music	Outstanding Achievement in Cinematography
Gorō Yasukawa – Rebirth; Yoshihiro Ike – Detective in the Bar; Taisei Iwasaki – Moteki; Kiyoko Ogino – A Ghost of a Chance; Takashi Kako – Saigo no Chūshingura	Junichi Fujisawa – Rebirth; Norimichi Kasamatsu – Someday; Mutsuo Naganuma – Saigo no Chūshingura; Osamu Fujiishi – Gaku: Minna no Yama; Hideo Yamamoto – A Ghost of a Chance
Outstanding Achievement in Lighting Direction	Outstanding Achievement in Art Direction
Masao Kanazawa – Rebirth; Kazuhiro Iwashita – Someday; Takaaki Miyanishi – Saigo no Chūshingura; Takayuki Kawabe – Gaku: Minna no Yama; Akira Ono – A Ghost of a Chance	Yoshinobu Nishioka and Tetsuo Harada – Saigo no Chūshingura; Nariyuki Kondō – Bushi no Kakeibo; Yōhei Taneda – A Ghost of a Chance; Yūji Hayashida – Hara-Kiri: Death of a Samurai; Chie Matsumoto – Rebirth
Outstanding Achievement in Sound Recording	Outstanding Achievement in Film Editing
Kenichi Fujimoto – Rebirth; Tetsuo Segawa – A Ghost of a Chance; Tomoaki Tamura and Tsuyoshi Murozono – Detective in the Bar; Yasumasa Terui – Someday; Toyotaka Nakaji and Tetsuo Segawa – Saigo no Chūshingura	Chise Sanjō – Rebirth; Yūsuke Ishida – Moteki; Sōichi Ueno – A Ghost of a Chance; Chizuko Osada – Saigo no Chūshingura; Shinya Tadano – Detective in the Bar
Outstanding Foreign Language Film	Special Award from the Chairman
The King's Speech; Rise of the Planet of the Apes; The Social Network; Black Swan; Moneyball	Shigeru Okada (Producer); Takeji Sano (Lighting Technician); Hideko Takamine (Actress); Yoshio Harada (Actor); Yoshimitsu Morita (Director)
Special Award from the Association	
Hisatoshi Goshozono (Sceneshifter)	
