= Toshiaki Toyoda =

Japanese film director and screenwriter (born 1969)

- 豊田 利晃
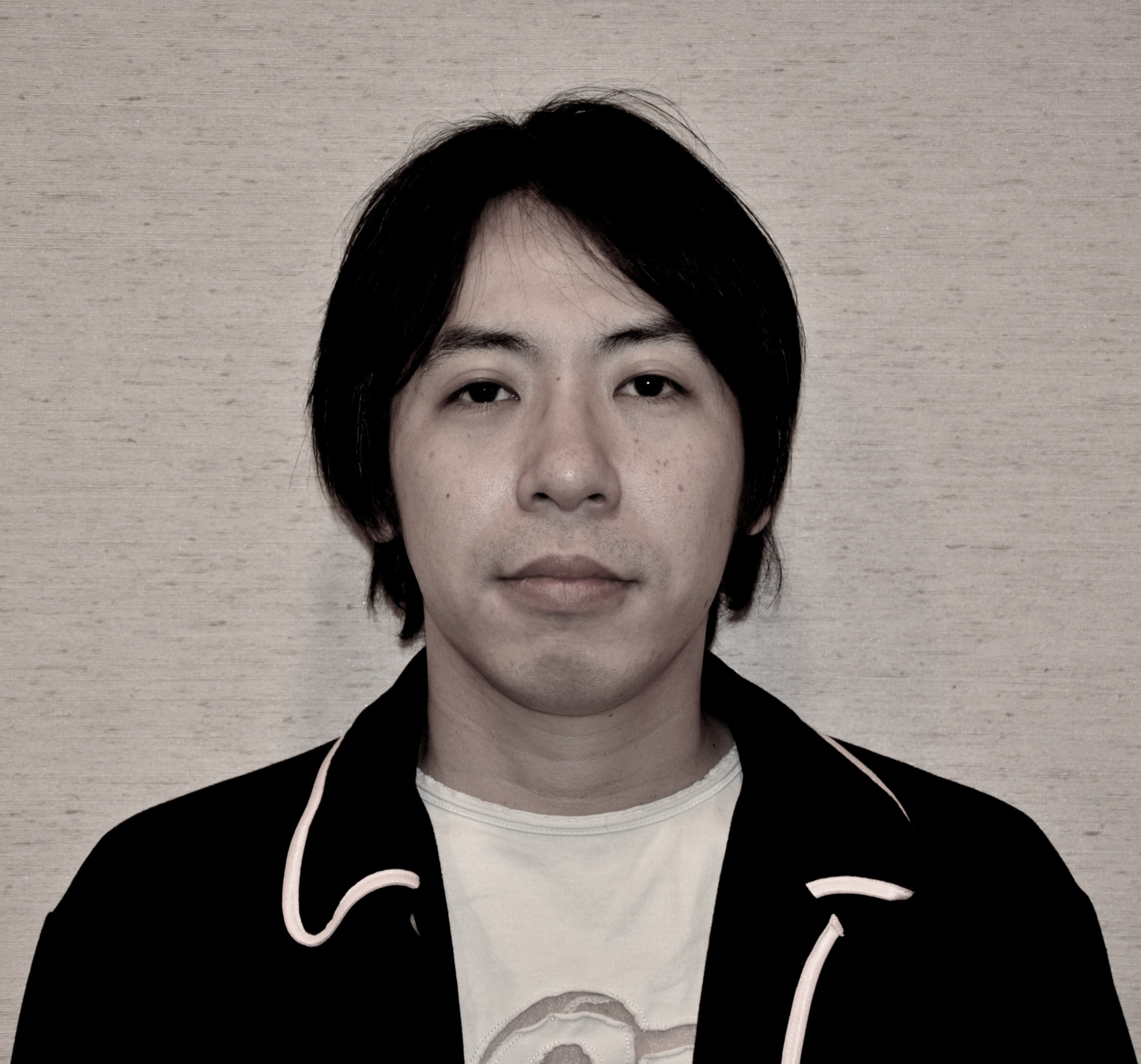
- Toyoda in 2009
- Born: March 10, 1969 (age 57); Osaka Prefecture, Japan
- Occupations: Film director; screenwriter
- Years active: 1991-present

Toshiaki Toyoda (豊田利晃, Toyoda Toshiaki; born March 10, 1969, in Osaka) is a Japanese film director and screenwriter based in Komae, Tokyo. He is best known for his feature films Blue Spring (2001), 9 Souls (2003) and Hanging Garden (2005), which, among others, have garnered him an international cult following.

== Early life ==
Toshiaki Toyoda was born in Osaka Prefecture. As a child he was a prodigy in the game of shogi. He attended the Japan Shogi Association's apprenticeship (Shōreikai) from age 9 with the aim of eventually becoming a professional player. When he was 17 years old he had to choose between either pursuing a career as a professional shogi player or follow his newfound dream of filmmaking. After this he stopped playing in a professional capacity.

== Career ==
Toyoda moved to Tokyo as a teenager, taking with him only two guitars and 20,000 yen. He began working with producer Genjirō Arato and director Junji Sakamoto, assisting the latter on the shogi-related film Ōte (1991), for which he helped pen the script.

=== 1998–2005: Early works ===
Toyoda released his debut feature film Pornostar (ポルノスター) in 1998, which earned him the Directors Guild of Japan New Directors Award that same year. The 1990s marked a fascination with juvenile criminals and violence in Japan. Films such as 2000's Battle Royale, 2001's Ichi the Killer and Suicide Club are examples of that and have been put into a bracket with Pornostar. The film follows Arano (Chihara Junia), a young man who is on a mission to kill yakuza. The Japanese band Dip provided the grundgy stoner rock soundtrack for the movie.

Toyoda's sophomore feature Blue Spring (青い春) was released in 2001 and quickly garnered a cult following. It is an adaptation of an autobiographical anthology manga series by Taiyō Matsumoto. The movie is set in a derelict high school and follows a group of delinquent students and their violent exploits. The group's new leader, Kujo (Ryuhei Matsuda), quickly gets bored with his position of power. 2001 also saw the release of Unchain (アンチェイン), a documentary following a failed professional boxer named Kaji and his friends. Kaji had to give up boxing because of nerve damage and struggles to hold a job. As of 2017, Toyoda is still in touch with Kaji and his friends.

In 2003 Toyoda's third feature film Nine Souls (ナイン・ソウルズ), the story of nine prison inmates breaking out of jail and searching for a hidden treasure, released to the public. Even after the group of men (including Ryuhei Matsuda, Jun Kunimura and Yoshio Harada among others) escape they are faced with a bleak reality: Being guilty in the eyes of society makes the whole world their prison. In a 2012 interview Toyoda has said that the movie was inspired by an American case of prison escape a few years prior to the film's release. Toyoda's career prospects were looking bright, judging by the international success of Nine Souls, but he suffered a setback when he was arrested on drug charges just before his next film Hanging Garden (空中庭園), an adaptation of Mitsuyo Kakuta's 2003 novel of the same name, was released in 2005.

Toyoda was arrested for possession of a controlled substance (marijuana) on August 23, 2005, weeks before Hanging Garden was getting a theatrical release. He has since described his subsequent treatment as being blacklisted from the Japanese film industry.

=== 2009–2018: Return to filmmaking ===
After his arrest and trial in 2005, Toyoda laid low for a while. He did not resume directing until 2009 with his fifth feature film The Blood of Rebirth (蘇りの血). Toyoda shared in a 2012 interview that his alienation from society even went so far that he moved to a cabin in the forest where he came up with the outline of Monsters Club (モンスターズクラブ), his second feature after the arrest. The film is heavily inspired by the life of American terrorist Ted Kaczynski and explores a man's (Eita Nagayama) isolation, political thoughts (written down in a manifesto) and finally his supernatural encounter with a spiritual entity in the woods.

2012 saw the release of I'm Flash!. The movie centers on a Japanese new religion leader (Tatsuya Fujiwara) who gets into hot water and withdraws to a remote island with his bodyguard played by Ryuhei Matsuda. The film has been described as a meditation on survivor's guilt. While the film has been read as a critique of new religious movements, Toyoda later said in an interview that "faith has provided [him] with plentiful of insight regarding questions of [death]."

The Planetist (プラネティスト) is a 2018 documentary on the Ogasawara Islands and marks Toyoda's first documentary film since 2001's Unchain. It is the result of a year-spanning stay at the islands, a UNESCO World Heritage Site. It features Noritsugu Miyagawa, known as "Tarzan of the Sea", among a group of friends that Toyoda invited to join him on the islands. The documentary takes the form of segments dedicated to each member of the group while highlighting the setting in a naturalistic manner. The documentary's observational style has been compared to that of Kazuhiro Soda.

2018 also saw the release of The Miracle of Crybaby Shottan (泣き虫しょったんの奇跡), a movie following the life of Shōji Segawa, a professional shogi player. Toyoda reported feeling a strong connection to Segawa upon reading his autobiography, released in 2006 under the same name as the eventual movie adaptation. The film features Takako Matsu, Satoshi Tsumabuki, Kiyohiko Shibukawa and Jun Kunimura along with Ryuhei Matsuda playing the lead role, making this the fourth such collaboration of him and Toyoda.

=== 2019–present: Resurrection trilogy and short films ===
On April 18, 2019 Toyoda was arrested by the Japanese authorities on suspicion of possessing a firearm. He was later let go. In an interview several months after the incident Toyoda tells that the police raided his home for illegal drugs, and found an antique World War II gun from his grandparents which was no longer working. He expressed frustration at the Japanese state calling it "a fascist state" and "a dangerous place to live [in]". He also voiced interest in making a film about his experience, which he envisioned as "a sequel to 9 Souls".

Toyoda's next movie, 2019's short film Wolf's Calling (狼煙が呼ぶ), follows a young woman looking through an abandoned building and finding a gun in a box. The short film then transforms into a musical montage of an assembling crew of nameless samurai, all marching towards a wolf shrine. The score is composed by Japanese "Edo-punk" band Seppuku Pistols. Seppuku Pistols later even toured the country on the occasion of Wolf's Calling's premiere.

Toyoda's 2020 film The Day of Destruction (破壊の日, Hakai no Hi) was made as a reaction to the 2020 Summer Olympics held in Tokyo. The movie takes place in an epidemic-ridden Japan. The plague is blamed on a monster, but Shugendō follower Kenichi (played by GEZAN's vocalist Mahi to the People) believes he can stop its spread by undergoing a pilgrimage. Originally a commentary on the greed connected with the Olympic games, Toyoda's screenplay was soon applied to the COVID-19 pandemic. As Japan has declared the day a public holiday, Toyoda organized a live performance under the same name as the film on the preceding night. The performance took place as a legal demonstration and involved long-time collaborator Shibukawa and bands Seppuku Pistols and GEZAN. Toyoda was filming and livestreaming the demonstration the entire time. He dedicates the film and its namesake performance to his rage about the capitalist system and the Japanese government, especially its handling of the COVID-19 pandemic. The film includes original music from Japanese bands Seppuku Pistols, GEZAN and Mars89. Toyoda described the casting process as "gathering a bunch of friends." Even his cinematographer Kenji Maki is an old collaborator, for he was the director of photography assistant on 2001's Blue Spring.

2021's short film Go Seppuku Yourselves (全員切腹) marked the third entry in Toyoda's unofficial series of movies, dubbed the Resurrection Trilogy, Wolf Mountain Trilogy or Wolf Shrine films by different writers. (Note: The name is unofficial and consists of different arrangements of the words Mountain, Wolf, Resurrection and Shrine. As of April 2025 the latest arrangement is Mt. Resurrection Wolf used by Blake Simmons of Eastern Kicks.) The three films so far, as well as the four entries that would follow, are connected by a theme of human ignorance, especially on repeating the mistakes of the past. They are commonly read as transparent critique on the Japanese government. The film merges the first two by being set in the Meiji era, while the land is going through an epidemic of illness. Danbe (Kiyohiko Shibukawa) is tasked to assist the ritual suicide of Raikan (Yosuke Kubozuka), a wandering samurai that has been made the scapegoat of the plague. It again features a score by Mars89. The final scene of the film has been compared to Takashi Miike's 2011 film Hara-Kiri: Death of a Samurai.

After releasing several more short films in the years following Go Seppuku Yourselves, Toyoda's eleventh feature film ''Transcending Dimensions (次元を超える) released in 2025, and is, according to Toyoda, the seventh entry into the informal Resurrection/Wolf Mountain series. The story revolves around a hitman (Ryuhei Matsuda) hunting after an elusive cult leader, after the latter has seemingly enchanted a local monk (Yosuke Kubozuka). The movie mixes science fiction with crime drama elements. Multiple journalists have commented on the similarities and recurring imagery from the preceding Wolf Mountain films. The movie's soundtrack is courtesy of British jazz band Sons of Kemet. In a Q&A after a screening of Transcending Dimensions Toyoda has expressed the possibility that this might be his last feature film.

=== Music videos ===
Additionally to films, Toyoda has directed multiple music videos over the span of his career. Comparing the two mediums he has said the following: "[Making music videos is] creating pictures for music. [...] When you create films you are adding music to a picture."

== Influences, style and themes ==
In a 2012 interview Toyoda named Bruce Lee as his favorite director.

Toyoda has said that he focuses on making the dialogue in his films "simple [and] punchy". On the surreal elements in his movies, Toyoda says "The collision of reality and the supernatural is the natural way of the world, as I see and feel it."

Many of Toyoda's films feature misfits who struggle to fit into societal norms. Other themes in his work include rebirth, death, spirituality, isolation and violence. The theme of spirituality has become even more pronounced in Toyoda's modern output. In a 2025 interview he admitted to being interested in various forms of spiritual and religious practice such as meditation since he was a teenager. He also shared that he is in the midst of ascetic training.

== Critical reception ==
Writing in 2019 for Asian Movie Pulse, Panos Kotzathanasis calls Blue Spring "a cult film" and "the guerilla/punk film [...] apogee." He especially compliments the movie's presentation and credits cinematographer Norimichi Kasamatsu, editor Mototaka Kusakabe as well as the soundtrack contributed by garage rock band Thee Michelle Gun Elephant.

Toyoda's informal Resurrection Trilogy has garnered positive praise for its political themes and timeliness, while other writers have voiced their disappointment. Brooke Heinz calls the first two entries "admirable" but writes that "despite some nice visuals and excellent sound design and music, neither of the resulting films are as challenging as the events which surround them", referencing Toyoda's arrest, the 2020 Summer Olympics and the COVID-19 pandemic, all of which served as inspiration and fuel for the resulting movies.

In a piece written for Another Magazine in 2021, James Balmont compares Toyoda's career trajectory with those of some of his more successful contemporaries in Japan such as Takashi Miike, Sion Sono, Hirokazu Kore-eda and Kiyoshi Kurosawa. Balmont notes that while these directors also started as rebel filmmakers they have each become internationally acclaimed names. He attributes this difference to the "infamy" around Toyoda caused by the two scandals (2005 arrest and 2019 arrest) he has gone through.

== Filmography ==
Feature films

Year	Title	Director	Writer	Producer	Ref(s).
1998	Pornostar (ポルノスター, Porunosutā)	Yes	Yes	No	
2001	Blue Spring (青い春, Aoi haru)	Yes	Yes	No	
2003	9 Souls (ナイン・ソウルズ, Nainu sōruzu)	Yes	Yes	No	
2005	Hanging Garden (空中庭園, Kūchū teien)	Yes	Yes	No	
2009	The Blood of Rebirth (蘇りの血, Yomigaeri no chi)	Yes	Yes	No	
2011	Monsters Club (モンスターズクラブ, Monsutāzu kurabu)	Yes	Yes	No	
2012	I'm Flash!	Yes	Yes	No	
2014	Crows Explode (クローズ EXPLODE, Kurōzu Explode)	Yes	No	No	
2018	The Miracle of Crybaby Shottan (泣き虫しょったんの奇跡, Nakimushi shotta n no kiseki)	Yes	Yes	No	
2020	The Day of Destruction (破壊の日, Hakai no Hi)	Yes	Yes	No	
2021	Shiver (戦慄せしめよ, Senritsu seshimeyo)	Yes	—N/a	No	
2025	Transcending Dimensions (次元を超える, Jigen o koeru)	Yes	Yes	No	

Short films

Year	Title	Director	Writer	Producer	Ref(s).
2019	Wolf's Calling (狼煙が呼ぶ, Noroshi ga Yobu)	Yes	Yes	Yes	
2021	Go Seppuku Yourselves (全員切腹, Zen'in seppuku)	Yes	Yes	Yes	
2022	Alive. (生きている。, Ikiteiru.)	Yes	Yes	Yes	
2023	I'm Here (ここにいる。, Koko ni iru.)	Yes	Yes	Yes	
2024	I'm Coming (すぐにゆく。, Sugu ni yuku.)	Yes	Yes	Yes	

Documentaries

Year	Title	Ref(s).
2001	Unchain (アンチェイン)	
2018	Planetist (プラネティスト)	

Music videos

- "Kimi to Iu Hana" (Asian Kung-Fu Generation)
- "Siren" (Asian Kung-Fu Generation)
- "Ato 10 Byō de"(Art-School)
- "Lost in the Air" (Art-School)
- "Hakkō" (Rosso)
- "Sangatsu" (Does)
