= Sea Kumada =

Japanese child actress and tarento (born 2001)

- 熊田聖亜
- Born: July 18, 2001 (age 24); Tokyo, Japan
- Citizenship: Japanese
- Occupations: actress, tarento
- Years active: 2007–2014
- Employer: Mondorama Entertainment
- Known for: Rebirth (film); Ashita, Mama ga Inai (TV drama)
- Notable work: Saya Zamurai
- Height: 161 cm (63 in)
- Relatives: Koko Kumada (sister)
- Awards: 35th Japan Academy Prize – Newcomer of the Year
- Website: Profile at Mondorama Entertainment

Sea Kumada (熊田 聖亜, Kumada Sea; born July 18, 2001) is a Japanese child actress and tarento. She is best known for her work in Saya Zamurai, for which she won a Newcomer of the Year Award at the 35th Japan Academy Prize ceremony.

Her sister is child actress Koko Kumada.

== Biography ==
Sea Kumada was born July 18, 2001, in Tokyo, Japan.

For the 2011 movie Saya Zamurai, directed by Hitoshi Matsumoto, she received one of the seven Newcomer of the Year awards at the 35th Japan Academy Prize ceremony.

== Filmography ==
=== Films ===
- Boku no Hatsuki o Kimi ni Sasagu (僕の初恋をキミに捧ぐ; lit. Offering You My First Crush) (2009, Toho) - Mayu Taneda (as a child)
- Magare! Spoon (曲がれ!スプーン; lit. Twisting! Spoon) (2009, Toho) - Hikari Sakurai (as a child)
- Paradise Kiss (2011, Warner Bros.) - Yukari Hayasaka (as a child)
- Saya Zamurai (さや侍; lit. Scabbard Samurai) (2011, Shochiku) - Tae

=== Animation films ===
- Pretty Cure All Stars New Stage: Friends of the Future (2012, Toei) – Fū-chan (voice)

=== Television dramas ===
- Thrill na Yoru: Kosodate no Tensai (スリルな夜・子育ての天才, Suriru na Yoru: Kosodate no Tensai; lit. Night of Thrills: Raising a Genius) (April 13 - June 22, 2007, Fuji TV)
- Ryūsei no Kizuna (October 17 - December 19, 2008, TBS) - young Shizuna
- Orthros no Inu (July 24 - September 25, 2009, TBS) - Rei Hasebe
- Gekai Hatomura Shūgorō - Chi Nurareta Chōsenjō II (外科医 鳩村周五郎・血ぬられた挑戦状II; lit. Shūgorō Hatomura, Surgeon - The Challenge Written in Blood II) (August 28, 2009, Fuji TV) - Marina Suzuki
- Kamen Rider W episode 27, "The D Was Watching/The Transparent Magical Lady" (March 21, 2010, TV Asahi) - young Lily Shirogane
- Class Reunion - Love Again Syndrome (同窓会〜ラブ・アゲイン症候群, Dōsōkai - Rabu Agein Shōkōgun) (April 22 - June 17, 2010, TV Asahi) - Mana Nishikawa
- Dr. Irabu Ichirō (Dr.伊良部一郎) episode 5 (February 27, 2011, TV Asahi) - Yui
- Mito Kōmon series 43, episode 3, "Meiba ga Mamotta Chichiko no Kizuna - Hiratsuka" (名馬が守った父娘の絆 -平塚-, lit. "The Bonds of a Father and Daughter Who Protected a Famous Horse - Hiratsuka") (July 18, 2011, TBS) - Okoma
- Mieru Onna Tsukiko - Mannatsu no Yoru no Kowāi Hanashi (ミエルオンナ月子〜真夏の夜のコワーイ話〜; lit. The Medium Tsukiko - Scary Midsummer's Eve Stories) (August 26, 2011, NTV) - Nozomi Izawa
- Runaway - Aisuru Kimi no Tame ni (ランナウェイ〜愛する君のために, Rannauei...; lit. Runaway - For My Beloved) (October 27 - December 22, 2011, TBS) - Sakura Miyamoto
- Miyabe Miyuki Mystery - Perfect Blue episode 8 (November 26, 2012, TBS) - young Akie Asō
- Kakushō - Keishichō Sōsa 3-ka (確証〜警視庁捜査3課; lit. Proof - Metropolitan Police Department Criminal Investigations Department 3) episodes 5-6 (May 13/20, 2013, TBS) - Haruna Shimizu
- Nejireta Kizuna - Aka-chan Torichigae Jiken - 42-nen no Shinjitsu (ねじれた絆 赤ちゃん取り違え事件 42年の真実; lit. Twisted Bonds - The Case of the Baby Switch - The Truth of 42 Years) (October 11, 2013, Fuji TV) - Miyuki Inafuku (Miyuki Shimabukuro)
- White Lab - Keishichō Tokubetsu Kagaku Sōsahan (ホワイト・ラボ〜警視庁特別科学捜査班〜, Howaito Rabo...; lit. White Lab: Metropolitan Police Department Special Forensics Division) episode 6 (May 19, 2014, TBS) - Haruka Okunuki

=== Other television ===
- Sore Ike! Anpanman Club (2007-2008, BS Nitere) - self
- Karada de Asobo (からだであそぼ; lit. "Let's Exercise Our Bodies") (2008, NHK) - self
- Sandē Baryū Fībā Shokora (サタデーバリューフィーバー ショコラ; lit. "Sunday Value Fever - Chocora") (2008, NTV)

== Awards ==
- 35th Japan Academy Prize (2012) — Newcomer of the Year
