= Kokoro Terada =

Japanese actor and television personality (born 2008)

- 寺田 心
- Born: 10 June 2008 (age 18); Aichi Prefecture, Japan
- Occupations: Actor; television personality
- Years active: 2011–present
- Agent: Jobbykids

Kokoro Terada (寺田 心, Terada Kokoro; born 10 June 2008) is a Japanese actor and television personality.

== Filmography ==
=== Films ===
Year	Title	Role	Notes	Ref.
2014	Twilight Sasara Saya	Daiya		
2014	L DK	Kota Hoshino		
2018	My Dad is a Heel Wrestler	Shōta		
2021	The Great Yokai War: Guardians	Kei Watanabe		
2022	Fullmetal Alchemist: The Revenge of Scar	Selim		
2022	Fullmetal Alchemist: The Final Alchemy	Selim		
2023	The Imaginary	Rudger (voice)		

=== Television dramas ===
Year	Title	Role	Notes	Ref.
2013	Tonbi	Yasuo Ichikawa (child)		
2014	Tomorrow, Mother will Not be here	Nippachi		
2015	Hotel Concierge	Tsubasa Kaiho	Episode 1	
2015	Shortcut to Brazil	Riku	Short drama; anthology series	
2015	5→9 From Five to Nine	Sankyu Naha		
2016	Oookaechizen3	Sannosuke	Episode 2	
2016	Our House	Shintaro Ban		
2016	The Sniffer	Youichi Kashima	Japanese remake	
2017	Naotora: The Lady Warlord	Taomatsu (child)		
2023	Ranman	Kotetsu Yamamoto (young)		
2025	Unbound	Tayasu Masamaru		

- Home Alone 3 (2019 NTV edition), Alex Pruitt (Alex D. Linz)

=== Narration ===
Year	Title	Role	Notes	Ref.
2015	NHK BS Premium Huge Glacier Annihilation: America Five large lake Niagara waterfall			
2016	NHK Great Earth Vanuatu Bodily sensation！Furious Volcano			

=== Music programs ===
- どぅんつくぱ〜Time of music〜 MC Kokoro kun (Fuji TV/2014)

=== Information programs ===
- Hirunandesu! (Nippon TV) Occasional Appearance
- syumi doki! Kokoro's dog cram school〜Can read the air Aim for a dog!〜 student (NHK ETV / 2016)

=== Other ===
- EN MAN SOM HETER OVE/A MAN CALLED OVE Preview Event (2016)
- Netflix Original drama Fuller House Season2 Japan Premier Event (2016)
- Rio Suzuki Dance shinai？ Release Event (2016)
- Ito Yokado osechi 2017 PR Event (2016)
- wisteria pharmacy Good teeth declaration at Brian PR Event (2016)
- 66th NHK Kōhaku Uta Gassen Fuyumi Sakamoto co-starring (2015)
- Ryuzo and the Seven Henchmen DVD＆Blu-ray Release Event (2015)
- 5 Seconds of Summer/She's Kinda Hot Japan version MV (2015)
- belle and sebastian talk show (2015)
- kooky Director＆starring Visiting Japan Commemoration Event (2015)
- TOKYO GIRLS COLLECTION 2015 AUTUMN／WINTER (2015)
- Mezamashi TV Halloween Event T-SPOOK (2014)

== Awards ==
Year presented, name of the award ceremony, category, nominee(s) of the award, and the result of the nomination
Year	Award ceremony	Category	Nominated work(s)	Result	Ref.
2015	55th ACC TOKYO CREATIVITY AWARDS	Acting	Bacteria Parent and Child	Won	
2018	Milan Film Festival	Best Actor	Grandma is Okay	Won	
