= List of imaginary characters in fiction =

This is a list of imaginary characters in fiction, being characters that are imagined by other characters. The list is divided into sections by the primary medium.

== Film ==
Imaginary character	Film	Description	Ref.
Adolf Hitler	Jojo Rabbit	Imaginary friend of the title character	
Billy	The A-Team	Murdock's invisible dog	
Bing Bong	Inside Out	Childhood friend of Riley	
Blue (and several other characters)	IF	Jeremy's childhood imaginary friend	
Captain Excellent	Paper Man	Richard's childhood imaginary friend, a superhero	
Charles	A Beautiful Mind	John Nash's best friend	
Chauncey	Imaginary	Jessica’s old Teddy bear	
Drop Dead Fred	Drop Dead Fred		
Elvis Presley	True Romance		
Eric Cantona	Looking for Eric		
Frank	Donnie Darko	Guy in a skeletal rabbit costume	
The Green Fairy	EuroTrip		
Harvey	Harvey	Giant invisible rabbit	
Humphrey Bogart	Play It Again, Sam	Allan Felix's alter ego	
Jack Flack	Cloak & Dagger		
Kaiser Soze	The Usual Suspects	Fictional crime lord	
Mr. Floppy	Unhappily Ever After	Perverted gray stuffed bunny	
Mother Bates	Psycho	Norman’s mother	
Parcher	A Beautiful Mind	FBI Agent, John Nash's handler	
Ricky Stanicky	Ricky Stanicky	imaginary friend used as a scapegoat by three friends	
Rudger	The Imaginary		
Sy	Everything You Want		
Tony and Lloyd the bartender (and several other characters)	The Shining		
Tully	Tully		

== Literature ==
Imaginary character	Book	Description	Ref.
Angus	Small Gods	Imaginary companion of the anchorite St Ungulant	
The Bear	The Bear	by Raymond Briggs	
Beekle	The Adventures of Beekle: The Unimaginary Friend	Waits on the imaginary friends’ island for a child to imagine him	
Booby	The Unicorn in the Garden	Unicorn in the short story by James Thurber	
Budo (and several other characters)	Memoirs of an Imaginary Friend	Protagonist in the novel by Matthew Dicks	
Chocky	Chocky	Twelve-year-old Matthew Gore's imaginary friend	
Dorothy Spinner's imaginary friends		Dorothy Spinner, a DC Comics character, can manifest her imaginary friends into reality	
Eyeore	Winnie-the-Pooh	Stuffed donkey that comes to life for Christopher Robin	
Fats	Magic	Magician Corky's ventriloquist’s dummy	
Hobbes	Calvin and Hobbes	A plush tiger come-to-life in comic strips by Bill Watterson	
The Imaginary Friend	The Hole in the Sum of My Parts	Book by Matt Harvey	
Jimmy Jimmereeno	Uncle Wiggily in Connecticut	Ramona Wengler's imaginary friend in the short story by J. D. Salinger	
Kanga	Winnie-the-Pooh	Stuffed kangaroo that comes to life for Christopher Robin	
Los Chimichangos	Skippyjon Jones	Colorful chihuahuas who are imagined by Skippyjon Jones	
Malcolm/Sally	Awful End	Stuffed goat in several books by Philip Ardagh	
Ninja Ninja	Afro Samurai	Afro's friend	
Owl	Winnie-the-Pooh	Stuffed owl that comes to life for Christopher Robin	
Piglet	Winnie-the-Pooh	Stuffed pig that comes to life for Christopher Robin	
Pobby and Dingan	Pobby and Dingan	imaginary friends of Kellyanne Williamson	
The Policemen	The Third Policeman	Novel by Flann O'Brien	
Rabbit	Winnie-the-Pooh	Stuffed animal that comes to life for Christopher Robin	
Roo	Winnie-the-Pooh	Stuffed kangaroo that comes to life for Christopher Robin	
Rudger	The Imaginary		
Sam	The Light Jar	Nate's childhood imaginary friend	
Skellig	Skellig		
Soren Lorenson	Charlie and Lola	Lola's imaginary friend	
The Story Giant	The Story Giant		
Tigger	Winnie-the-Pooh	Stuffed animal that comes to life for Christopher Robin	
Tilly Tilly	The Icarus Girl	Eight-year-old Jessamy's invisible friend	
Tomo	Haganai	Yozora Mikazuki's friend	
The Wild Things	Where the Wild Things Are		
Winnie-the-Pooh	Winnie-the-Pooh	Stuffed teddy bear that comes to life for Christopher Robin	

== Television ==
Imaginary character	Television show	Description	Ref.
Barney	Barney & Friends	Purple dinosaur	
The Bear	The Bear		
Bloo (and several other characters)	Foster's Home for Imaginary Friends		
Dudley	Fancy Nancy	JoJo's imaginary friend	
Guinevere, Space Cat, Space Penguin and Space Tapir	Knights of Guinevere	Frankie's imaginary friends	
Happy	Happy!	Unicorn imagined by Nick Sax and his daughter Hailey	
Professor James Gellar	Dexter		
Josephina	Josephina the Whale	A whale who is a friend of Santi in the Japanese anime series	
Koosalagoopagoop	Dexter's Laboratory	Dee Dee's imaginary friend	
Mary	Imaginary Mary	Imaginary friend from Alice's childhood	
Milco	Home and Away	Originally believed to be Sally's imaginary friend, later revealed as Sally's twin	
Mr. Robot	Mr. Robot	Manifestation of Elliott’s father who has died	
Mr. Snuffleupagus	Sesame Street.	Former imaginary friend of Big Bird, later revealed to the rest of the cast	
Nadine Flumberghast	Arthur	Squirrel who is D.W. Read's friend	
Soren Lorenson	Charlie and Lola	Lola's imaginary friend	
Spiny Norman	Monty Python's Flying Circus	Giant hedgehog in the sketch Piranha Brothers	
Wilfred	Wilfred	Dog seen by Adam as a man in a dog suit	

== Theatre ==
Imaginary character	Play	Description	Ref.
Alberta	Avenue Q	Imaginary girlfriend invented by Rod to deny that he is gay	
Bunbury	The Importance of Being Earnest		
Elvira	Blithe Spirit		
Godot	Waiting for Godot	Unseen, ambiguously anticipated acquaintance of Vladimir and Estragon	
Harvey	Harvey	Giant invisible rabbit	

== Video games ==
Imaginary character	Video game	Description	Ref.
Faye	Finding Paradise		

== See also ==
- Imaginary friend – Psychological and social phenomenon
