= Konomi Watanabe =

Japanese child actress and tarento (born 2006)

- 渡邉 このみ
- Born: July 25, 2006 (age 19); Osaka Prefecture, Japan
- Occupations: Actress; tarento
- Years active: 2011–present
- Known for: Rebirth (movie); Ashita, Mama ga Inai (TV drama)
- Height: 153 cm (5 ft 0 in)
- Awards: 35th Japan Academy Prize Newcomer of the Year

Konomi Watanabe (渡邉 このみ, Watanabe Konomi; born July 25, 2006) is a Japanese actress and tarento.

For the 2011 Japanese movie Rebirth she received one of the seven Newcomer of the Year awards at the 35th edition of the Japan Academy Prize.

She is also known for the 2014 television drama Ashita, Mama ga Inai, in which she starred alongside child actresses Mana Ashida and Rio Suzuki.

== Filmography ==
=== Films ===
- Rebirth (2011), young Erina Akiyama
- 80 nen-go no Anata e (2025), Himari Yamakawa

=== Television ===
- Segodon (2018), young Iwayama Ito

== Awards ==
- 35th Japan Academy Prize (2012) — Newcomer of the Year

== Discography ==
=== Singles ===
No.	Title	Release date	Charts	Notes
No.	Title	Release date	JPN	Notes
1	"Dai-dai-daisuki! Tai-tai-taisetsu!" (だい・だい・だいすき!たい・たい・たいせつ!)	May 22, 2013	—	Music videos: "Dai-dai-daisuki! Tai-tai-taisetsu!" "Dai-dai-daisuki! Tai-tai-taisetsu!" "Tsutsumitai Tsutsumaretai"
