= Rebirth (2011 film) =

- Theatrical release poster
- Directed by: Izuru Narushima
- Written by: Satoko Okudera
- Based on: The Eight Day by Mitsuyo Kakuta
- Produced by: Naoki Sato; Yoichi Arishige; Naoko Yoshida
- Starring: Hiromi Nagasaku; Mao Inoue
- Cinematography: Junichi Fujisawa
- Edited by: Chise Sanjo
- Music by: Goro Yasukawa
- Release date: 29 April 2011 (Japan)
- Running time: 147 minutes
- Country: Japan
- Language: Japanese
- Box office: ¥1.24 billion ($15.54 million)

Rebirth (Japanese: 八日目の蝉, Hepburn: Yōkame no Semi) is a 2011 Japanese drama film directed by Izuru Narushima, based on author Mitsuyo Kakuta's novel. The film was a critical success, winning 10 awards at the 35th Japan Academy Prize, including Best Picture, Best Director, Best Leading Actress, Best Supporting Actress, and Best Script.

== Plot ==
A woman named Kiwako (Hiromi Nagasaku) abducts a baby from a man with whom she has had an affair. For four years Kiwako has raised the child as her own until she gets arrested. The child named Erina is then returned to her birth parents, but she can't find peace. As an adult, Erina (Mao Inoue) also has an affair with a married man and gets pregnant. To confront her past, Erina goes to Shodoshima where she has lived with Kiwako as a child. There Erina discovers a shocking truth and makes a decision.

== Cast ==
- Mao Inoue as Erina Akiyama
  - Konomi Watanabe as young Erina, or named as Kaoru by Kiwako
- Hiromi Nagasaku as Nonomiya Kiwako
- Eiko Koike as Chigusa Ando
- Tetsushi Tanaka as Takehiro Akiyama
- Yoko Moriguchi as Etsuko Akiyama
- Mitsuru Hirata as Yuzo Sawada
- Jun Fubuki as Masae Sawada
- Miwako Ichikawa as Kumi Sawada
- Kimiko Yo as Angel
- Min Tanaka as Taki
- Hitori Gekidan as Takashi Kishida
- Nahoko Yoshimoto as Yasue Nigawa
- Natsuki Inaba as Miki Nigawa

== Awards and nominations ==
Year	Ceremony	Category	Result
2012	35th Japan Academy Prize	Picture of the Year	Won
2012	35th Japan Academy Prize	Director of the Year (Izuru Narushima)	Won
2012	35th Japan Academy Prize	Screenplay of the Year (Satoko Okudera)	Won
2012	35th Japan Academy Prize	Outstanding Performance by an Actress in a Leading Role (Mao Inoue)	Won
2012	35th Japan Academy Prize	Outstanding Performance by an Actress in a Supporting Role (Hiromi Nagasaku)	Won
2012	35th Japan Academy Prize	Outstanding Achievement in Music (Gorô Yasukawa)	Won
2012	35th Japan Academy Prize	Outstanding Achievement in Cinematography (Jun'ichi Fujisawa)	Won
2012	35th Japan Academy Prize	Outstanding Achievement in Lighting Direction (Masao Kanazawa)	Won
2012	35th Japan Academy Prize	Outstanding Achievement in Sound Recording (Kenichi Fujimoto)	Won
2012	35th Japan Academy Prize	Outstanding Achievement in Film Editing (Chise Sanjo)	Won
2012	35th Japan Academy Prize	Outstanding Performance by an Actress in a Supporting Role (Eiko Koike)	Nominated
2012	35th Japan Academy Prize	Outstanding Achievement in Art Direction (Chie Matsumoto)	Nominated
2012	35th Japan Academy Prize	Newcomer of the Year (Konomi Watanabe)	Won
