= Hanging Garden (2005 film) =

- DVD cover
- 空中庭園
- Directed by: Toshiaki Toyoda
- Screenplay by: Toshiaki Toyoda
- Based on: Kūchū Teien by Mitsuyo Kakuta
- Produced by: Miyoshi Kikuchi
- Starring: Anne Suzuki; Kyōko Koizumi; Masahiro Hirota; Itsuji Itao
- Cinematography: Junichi Fujisawa
- Edited by: Mototaka Kusakabe
- Music by: Kazuhide Yamaji
- Distributed by: Asmik Ace Entertainment
- Release dates: May 12, 2005 (Cannes); October 8, 2005 (Japan)
- Running time: 114 minutes
- Country: Japan
- Language: Japanese

Hanging Garden (Japanese: 空中庭園, Hepburn: Kūchū Teien) is a 2005 Japanese film directed by Toshiaki Toyoda, based on a novel of the same name by Mitsuyo Kakuta. The film is a family drama concerning the Kyobashis, whose house rule is to not keep secrets from each other when asked a question directly.

== Cast ==
- Kyōko Koizumi as Eriko Kyobashi
- Anne Suzuki as Mana Kyobashi (as An Suzuki)
- Itsuji Itao as Takashi Kyobashi
- Masahiro Hirota as Ko Kyobashi
- Jun Kunimura as Eriko's brother
- Asami Imajuku as Sacchin
- Eita as Tezuka
- Sonim as Mina
- Hiromi Nagasaku as Asako Iizuka
- Michiyo Ōkusu as Satoko Kinosaki

== Awards ==
- Kyōko Koizumi - Best Actress, 2006 - Blue Ribbon Awards
- Kyōko Koizumi - Best Actress, 2006 - Nikkan Sports Film Awards
