= Blue Spring (film) =

2001 film by Toshiaki Toyoda

- Theatrical release poster
- Directed by: Toshiaki Toyoda
- Written by: Toshiaki Toyoda; Taiyō Matsumoto
- Based on: Blue Spring by Taiyō Matsumoto
- Produced by: Dai Miyazaki
- Starring: Ryuhei Matsuda; Hirofumi Arai; Sosuke Takaoka; Yusuke Oshiba; Yuta Yamazaki; Shugo Oshinari; Takashi Tsukamoto; Mame Yamada
- Cinematography: Norimichi Kasamatsu
- Edited by: Mototaka Kusakabe
- Distributed by: Arts Magic
- Release date: September 10, 2001
- Running time: 83 minutes
- Country: Japan
- Language: Japanese

Blue Spring (Japanese: 青い春, Hepburn: Aoi haru) is a 2001 Japanese teen drama film written and directed by Toshiaki Toyoda, based on the 1993 manga by Taiyō Matsumoto. It tells a tale of apathetic school students at a run-down Tokyo high school for boys. It was released in Japan on September 10, 2001.

The film title can be understood as "inexperienced years" or teenage years, but it also can be understood as "fresh start". According to manga artist Taiyō Matsumoto, the title is intended as a play on irony.

== Plot ==
At Asashi High, a run-down high school for boys, Kujo, Aoki, Yukio, Yoshimura, and Ota are a gang of school friends lost in apathy and dissatisfaction. They are aware their future offers limited options. Even most teachers have already written them off as a lost cause.

Kujo's gang is part of the school's illegal society, which is controlled through a rooftop game as a test of courage: the Clapping Game. Whoever wins the game gets to be the society's leader, and rules all gangs throughout Asahi High. No teacher can stand up to this society.

After a round of the Clapping Game, Kujo wins the leadership role, which excites his best friend Aoki, who wants Kujo to dominate the school through the use of casual violence. However, Kujo passively resists doing this.

Aoki eventually realizes his best friend only took part in the Clapping Game to pass the time, and that Kujo never wanted to be the school's leader. Devastated, he challenges Kujo for his leadership, and loses. As Aoki becomes disillusioned, alienated and hostile toward Kujo, friendships around them slowly fall apart, leading to a series of violent altercations within the school.

== Cast ==
- Ryuhei Matsuda as Kujo
- Hirofumi Arai as Aoki
- Sousuke Takaoka as Yukio
- Yusuke Oshiba as Kimura
- Yuta Yamazaki as Ota
- Shugo Oshinari as Yoshimura
- Kiyohiko Shibukawa as Kee
- Onimaru as Suzuki
- Eita as Obake/Ghost
- Rei Yamanaka as Leo
- Mame Yamada as Hanada-sensei
- Erena as high school girl
- Genta Dairaku as career counselor
- Kyôko Koizumi as kiosk woman
- Takashi Tsukamoto as freshman in baseball club

== Soundtrack ==
The Blue Spring original soundtrack rose to #24 on Oricon Albums Chart Top 30 shortly after the film release and Drop, a track from the soundtrack, rose to #13 on Oricon Singles Chart Top 30 in July 2002.

Track	Translated	Artist	Notes
"September Punk Children"	セプテンバー・パンク・チルドレン	Thee Michelle Gun Elephant	
"Akage no Kelly"	Red-haired Kelly	Thee Michelle Gun Elephant	from the 2001 album Rodeo Tandem Beat Specter. The opening scene.
"News"		analers	
"Black Limousine"		The Blondie Plastic Wagon	later appears on the 2004 album, Bitches Blue
"Raspberry Dance"		The Blondie Plastic Wagon	later appears on the 2004 album, Bitches Blue
"Beautiful Dreamer"		Stephen Foster	Yukio (Sôsuke Takaoka) strums this piece on his guitar
"Beat Specter Garcia"		Thee Michelle Gun Elephant	from the 2001 album Rodeo Tandem Beat Specter.
"Boogie"		Thee Michelle Gun Elephant	during the sequence of baseball player Kimura (Oshiba Yusuke)'s departure.
"Benjo"	Toilet	analers	The word "benjo" is slang for "toilet".
"Glory"			
"Mona Lisa"		Thee Michelle Gun Elephant	from the 2001 album Rodeo Tandem Beat Specter.
"Beat Specter Buchanan"		Thee Michelle Gun Elephant	from the 2001 album Rodeo Tandem Beat Specter.
"My Name Is Bob"		analers	
"Drop"		Thee Michelle Gun Elephant	Aoki (Hirofumi Arai)'s rooftop scene.
"Drop" (live)		Thee Michelle Gun Elephant	During the closing credits.

== DVD ==
Released under Artsmagic in 2004, the DVD features extras including two interviews with Toyoda, biographies and filmographies of the main actors and a feature-length commentary by Tom Mes, who edits Midnight Eye, an online English-language magazine of Japanese cinema.

== Reception ==
On Midnight Eye, Tom Mes said the film was "magnificent but much overlooked".
