= Collection (Thee Michelle Gun Elephant album) =

Studio album by Thee Michelle Gun Elephant
- Released: 12 June 2001
- Genre: Garage rock
- Length: 64:51
- Label: Alive

Thee Michelle Gun Elephant chronology
Casanova Snake (1999)	Collection (2001)	Rodeo Tandem Beat Specter (2001)

Collection is a compilation album by Thee Michelle Gun Elephant, released in 2001. This record was for North America only and, much like TMGE 106 released the previous year in Japan, contained selections from the band's catalogue. Alive Records made the album available as both a CD and a double LP version.

== Reception ==
In Music We Trust reviewed the album positively, stating that it was "stuffed full of every single one of TMGE's Should've Been Greatest Hits." Similarly, Exclaim! called the album "brilliant" and pointed out that the band's sound forced listeners to "focus on the entire experience, the sheer sonic tumult", highlighting "Boogie" as a standout track.

== Track listing ==
1. "Pinhead Cramberry Dance"
2. "Young Jaguar"
3. "Hi! China"
4. "Smokin' Billy"
5. "Lily"
6. "Out Blues"
7. "Why Do You Want To Shake?"
8. "Blue Nylon Shirts (From Balcony)"
9. "Black Tambourine"
10. "Boogie"
11. "The Birdmen"
12. "Baby, Please Go Home"
13. "Vibe On!"
14. "Revolver Junkies"
15. "World's End (Primitive Version)
16. "GT 400"
17. "Cisco"
