= High Time (TMGE album) =

Studio album by Thee Michelle Gun Elephant
- Released: 1996
- Genre: Garage rock
- Length: 52:30
- Label: Triad

Thee Michelle Gun Elephant chronology
Cult Grass Stars (1996)	High Time (1996)	Chicken Zombies (1997)

High Time is the second studio album by Thee Michelle Gun Elephant, released in 1996.

== Track listing ==
1. "brand new stone" - 4:38
2. "Lily" - 4:12
3. "Let's get love." - 4:58
4. "sweet MONACO" - 3:18
5. "chandelier" - 4:40
6. "blue nylon shirts (from bathroom)" - 3:23
7. "bowling machine" - 3:07
8. "Laugh the world!" - 6:09
9. "flash silver bus" - 2:50
10. "candy house (Texas style)" - 3:34
11. "sl(thr)ow" - 4:13
12. "Baby, please go home~wave'33" - 7:28
