= Chicken Zombies =

Studio album by Thee Michelle Gun Elephant
- Released: 1997
- Genre: Garage rock
- Length: 45:17
- Label: Triad

Thee Michelle Gun Elephant chronology
High Time (1996)	Chicken Zombies (1997)	Gear Blues (1998)

Professional ratings
Review scores
Source	Rating
The Encyclopedia of Popular Music	3/5 stars

Chicken Zombies is an album by Thee Michelle Gun Elephant, released in 1997.

The album made it to #4 on the Japanese albums chart.

== Album cover ==
The CD album cover is similar to the cover of Vincebus Eruptum by Blue Cheer. The cover of the vinyl release is a parody of The Who's Odds & Sods album. Rather than the band's helmets reading "R O C K," they spelled out "F U C K"; this did not stop the album cover from being advertised on billboards in Japan.

== Track listing ==
1. "Russian Huskey" - 2:24
2. "Hi! China!" - 2:56
3. "Mongoose" - 3:21
4. "Get Up Lucy (album version)" - 4:35
5. "The Birdmen" - 3:47
6. "Boogie" - 8:17
7. "I've never been you. (Jesus Time)" - 0:06
8. "Cow 5" - 2:00
9. "Culture (album version)" - 3:09
10. "Sunny Side River" - 4:27
11. "Bronze Master" - 3:22
12. "Romantic (broiler dinner version)" - 6:33
13. "I've never been you. (King Time)" - 0:20

== See also ==
- Poultrygeist: Night of the Chicken Dead, working title Poultrygeist: Attack of the Chicken Zombies, a 2006 film
