= 9 Souls =

- DVD cover
- Directed by: Toshiaki Toyoda
- Written by: Toshiaki Toyoda
- Produced by: Miyoshi Kikuchi; Keisuke Konishi
- Starring: Yoshio Harada; Ryuhei Matsuda; Genta Dairaku; Itsuji Itao; Kazuki Kitamura
- Cinematography: Junichi Fujisawa
- Edited by: Mototaka Kusakabe
- Music by: dip; Kazuhide Yamaji
- Production companies: Eisei Gekijo; Little More; TFC; Film Makers
- Release date: July 19, 2003 (Japan)
- Running time: 119 minutes
- Country: Japan
- Language: Japanese

9 Souls (Japanese: ナイン・ソウルズ, Hepburn: Nain Souruzu) is a 2003 Japanese crime drama film directed by Toshiaki Toyoda. It was released on July 19, 2003.

== Cast ==
- Yoshio Harada as Torakichi
- Ryuhei Matsuda as Michiru
- Genta Dairaku as Ushiyama
- Itsuji Itao as Fujio
- Kazuki Kitamura
- Kiyohiko Shibukawa
- Koji Chihara as Kazuma
- Mame Yamada as Shiratori
- Onimaru as Shishido
- Takako Matsu
- Takuji Suzuki as Inui

== Reception ==
The film was part of the International Competition: Long Films section at the 18th Fribourg International Film Festival. On Midnight Eye, Tom Mes said the "film witnesses the birth of an assured, mature director capable of handling multi-character storylines with confidence."
