= Cult Grass Stars =

Studio album by Thee Michelle Gun Elephant
- Released: 1996
- Genre: Garage rock
- Length: 60:27
- Label: Triad

Thee Michelle Gun Elephant chronology
Maximum! Maximum!! Maximum!!! (1993)	Cult Grass Stars (1996)	High Time (1996)

Cult Grass Stars is an album by Thee Michelle Gun Elephant, released in 1996. It is their first full release since being signed to Triad, following the self-released Maximum! Maximum!! Maximum!!! in 1993.

== Track listing ==
1. "Lizard" - 4:28
2. "Strawberry Garden" - 5:18
3. "King" - 3:18
4. "World's End (primitive version)" - 5:46
5. "Toy" - 5:28
6. "Black Tambourine" - 2:53
7. "I Was Walkin' & Sleepin'" - 5:16
8. "Dallas Fried Chicken" - 0:40
9. "Letter To Uncle Sam" - 8:13
10. "Suicide Morning" - 4:42
11. "Don't Sulk Baby" - 4:45
12. "I Have To Sleep" - 6:36
13. "Remember Amsterdam" - 3:04
