= Casanova Snake =

Studio album by Thee Michelle Gun Elephant
- Released: 2000
- Genre: Garage rock
- Length: 59:56
- Label: Triad

Thee Michelle Gun Elephant chronology
| Gear Blues (1998) | Casanova Snake (2000) | Collection (2001) |

Casanova Snake is an album by Thee Michelle Gun Elephant, released in 2000.

== Track listing ==
1. "Dead Star End" - 3:38
2. "Cobra" - 4:56
3. "Young Jaguar" - 3:11
4. "Plasma Dive" - 3:01
5. "Revolver Junkies" - 4:26
6. "Dust Bunny Rides On" - 2:55
7. "Naked Sun" - 3:46
8. "Rhapsody" - 4:03
9. "Bogie's Dawn" - 4:00
10. "Silk" - 4:34
11. "Pinhead Cramberry Dance" - 4:37
12. "Angie Motel" - 3:04
13. "GT400" - 4:16
14. "Pistol Disco" - 2:56
15. "Drop" - 6:29

== Bonus tracks ==
The European release contained three bonus tracks, which were all from the Japanese single 'Baby Stardust'. This single is from the band's next album 'Rodeo Tandem Beat Specter'

1. "Baby Stardust"
2. "Vegas Hip Glider"
3. "Musashino Elegy"
