= Kiyohiko Shibukawa =

Japanese fashion model actor (born 1974)

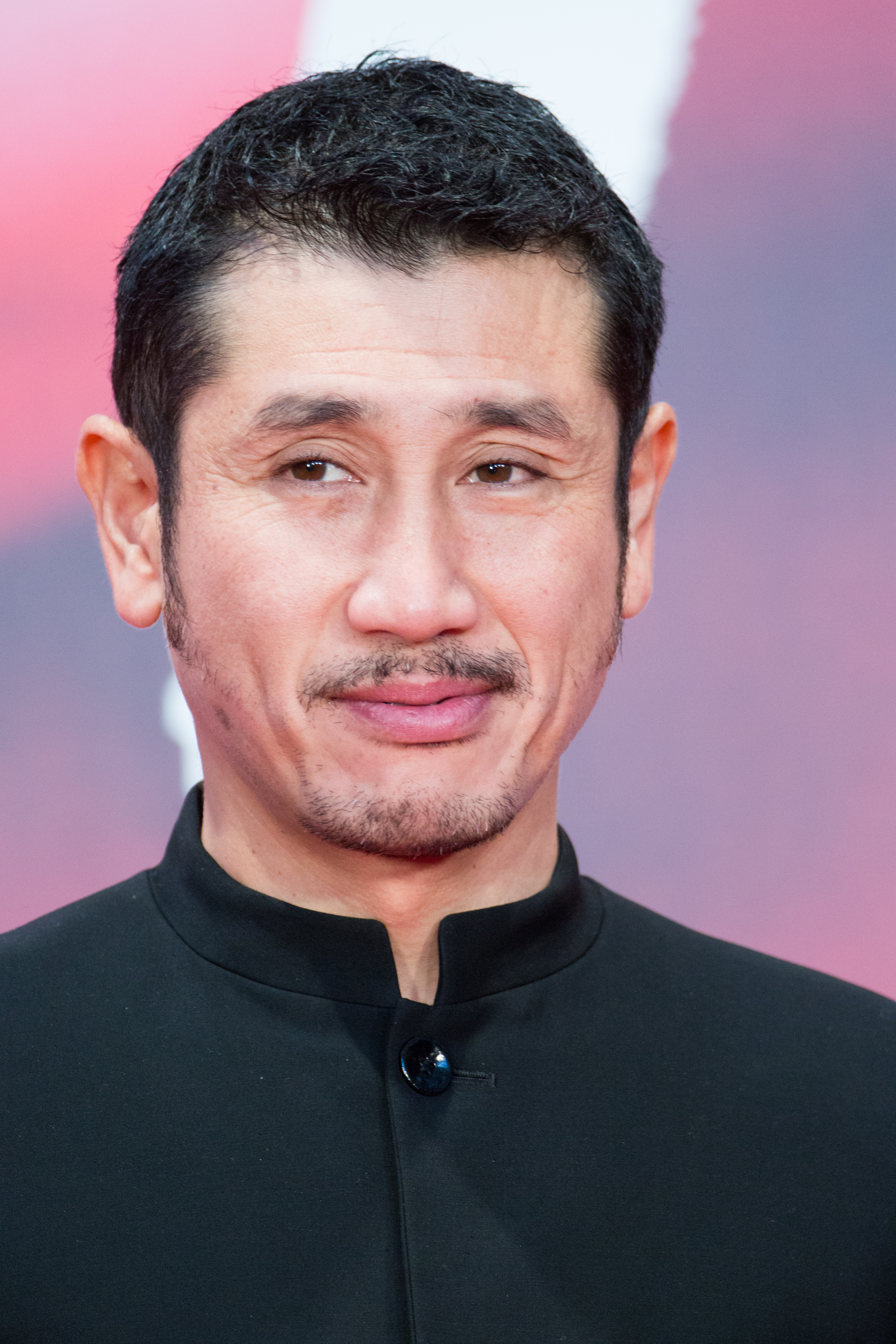
- Shibukawa at the Tokyo International Film Festival in 2017
- Born: 2 July 1974 (age 52); Shibukawa, Gunma, Japan
- Occupations: Fashion model, actor
- Years active: 1998–present

Kiyohiko Shibukawa (渋川清彦, Shibukawa Kiyohiko; born 2 July 1974) is a Japanese fashion model actor. He debuted as a model under the name Kee, but changed his name to "Kiyohiko Shibukawa" in 2006. He has appeared in more than 60 films since 1998.

== Selected filmography ==
=== Film ===
Year	Title	Role	Notes	Ref.
1998	Pornostar			
2001	Ichi the Killer			
2001	Blue Spring			
2002	The Mars Canon			
2003	9 Souls			
2006	Big Bang Love, Juvenile A			
2012	11:25 The Day He Chose His Own Fate			
2015	Love & Peace			
2017	Shimajima kaisha			
2017	Kiku and Guillotine			
2017	Reminiscence			
2018	Kami to hito to no aida			
2018	Enokida Trading Post		Lead role	
2018	Room Laundering			
2018	Zenigata			
2018	The Miracle of Crybaby Shottan			
2018	Punk Samurai Slash Down			
2018	Out and Out			
2019	Another World	Mitsuhiko Iwai		
2019	Tezuka's Barbara			
2019	We Are Little Zombies			
2019	Family of Strangers			
2019	A Life Turned Upside Down: My Dad's an Alcoholic		Lead role	
2019	Noroshi ga Yobu		Lead role; short film	
2020	37 Seconds			
2020	I Never Shot Anyone			
2020	Hakai no Hi	Teppei	Lead role	
2021	Baragaki: Unbroken Samurai	Nobori Nakajima		
2021	Wheel of Fortune and Fantasy		Anthology film	
2021	It's a Flickering Life			
2021	Last of the Wolves	Yukio Amagi		
2021	Go Seppuku Yourselves			
2021	99.9 Criminal Lawyer: The Movie	Takanobu Yamamoto		
2021	DIVOC-12		Anthology film	
2021	The Cursed Sanctuary X	Tadashi		
2021	Shrieking in the Rain	Inoue		
2022	Just Remembering			
2022	Two Outs Bases Loaded	Onihei		
2022	Rageaholic			
2022	Homestay			
2022	The Hound of the Baskervilles: Sherlock the Movie	Raita Furaku		
2022	Offbeat Cops	Tatsuya Hirooka		
2022	Tsuyukusa			
2022	Sanka			
2022	Kingdom 2: Far and Away	Fu Hushen		
2022	Convenience Story			
2023	Winny			
2023	Goldfish	Animal		
2023	Lumberjack the Monster			
2024	Transcending Dimensions			
2024	All the Long Nights	Tsujimoto Norihiko		
2024	The Box Man	Badge-wearing Beggar		
2024	Promised Land			
2024	The Voices at War	Eifū Nagasawara		
2025	Or Utopia			
2025	The Boy and the Dog			
2025	Principal Examination	Haruhiko Nakayama	Lead role	
2025	Blue Boy Trial	Takayuki Okabe		
2025	After the Quake	Tabata		
2025	Meets the World	Oshin		
2025	Night Flower	Iwakura		
2026	The Samurai and the Prisoner	Saika Magoroku		
2026	Tokyo Burst: Crime City	Kobayashi	Japanese–Korean film	
2026	The Village of Eight Gravestones			
2026	Between Two Lovers	Mitsuhiro Soejima		
2027	Sins of Kujo: The Movie	Taketo Mitarai		
2027	Sleeping in the Red Earth			
2027	Last Vacation	Emori		
TBA	Funky Forest: The Second Contact			

=== Television ===
Year	Title	Role	Notes	Ref.
2018	Segodon	Itagaki Taisuke	Taiga drama	
2021	Bullets, Bones and Blocked Noses		Miniseries	
2023	The Child of God Murmurs		Television film	
2024	Golden Kamuy: The Hunt of Prisoners in Hokkaido	Kiichirō Wakayama		
2025	After the Quake	Tabata	Episode 3; miniseries	

== Awards and nominations ==
Year	Award	Category	Result	Ref.
2016	37th Yokohama Film Festival	Best Actor	Won	
2018	31st Nikkan Sports Film Awards	Best Supporting Actor	Nominated	
2019	32nd Nikkan Sports Film Awards	Best Supporting Actor	Won	
2020	74th Mainichi Film Awards	Best Supporting Actor	Nominated	
2020	62nd Blue Ribbon Awards	Best Supporting Actor	Nominated	

== See also ==
- Nan Goldin - He appeared on her work 'Tokyo Love'.
