= Blue Spring (manga) =

Manga by Taiyō Matsumoto

- Volume cover

青い春 (Aoi Haru)
- Genre: Drama, thriller
- Manga
- Written by: Taiyō Matsumoto
- Published by: Shogakukan
- English publisher: NA: Viz Media
- Published: May 1, 1993
- Volumes: 1
- icon

Blue Spring (Japanese: 青い春, Hepburn: Aoi Haru) is a Japanese manga written and illustrated by Taiyō Matsumoto. It is an anthology collection of short stories, all revolving around teenage boys at high school and the lives they live. A live action film adaptation was released in 2001. The manga was licensed for English-language release by Viz Media.

== Overview ==
Blue Spring is a collection of short stories centered on a group of disaffected high school students. While spring typically represents renewal, for them it is a time of listlessness and dissatisfaction. They pass their days in idleness, drawn to reckless behavior, including petty delinquency and a perilous rooftop game. Each character embodies the aimlessness and defiance of youth, their lives marked by fleeting distractions and an underlying search for purpose. The stories capture the tension between rebellion and the unspoken desire for meaning.

== Release ==
Blue Spring is written and illustrated by Taiyō Matsumoto. Shogakukan released a tankōbon volume under the Big Spirits Comics imprint on May 1, 1993. Shogakukan re-released it in wide-ban volume on December 19, 1998. Shogakukan re-released it again in a bunkoban edition on January 14, 2012.

In North America, Blue Spring was published in English language by Viz Media on January 4, 2005.

No.	Original release date	Original ISBN	English release date	English ISBN
1	May 1, 1993	978-4-09-183221-4	January 4, 2005	978-1-59116-645-0
1. If You're Happy and You Know It, Clap Your Hands (しあわせなら手をたたこう, Shiawase nara te o tatakō); 2. Revolver (Original Story by Caribu Marley) (リボルバー[原作/狩撫麻礼], Riborubā (Gensaku/ Karibu Marei)); 3. Mahjong Summer! (夏でポン！, Natsu de Pon!); 4. Suzuki-san (鈴木さん); 5. Peace (ピース, Pīsu); 6. The Family Restaurant is Our Paradise! (ファミリーレストランは僕らのパラダイスなのさ！, Famirī Resutoran wa bokura no Paradaisuna no sa!); 7. This is Bad (だみだこりゃ, Damida Korya)
