= Gear Blues =

Studio album by Thee Michelle Gun Elephant
- Released: November 1998
- Recorded: 1997–1998
- Genre: Garage rock
- Length: 55:45
- Label: Triad

Thee Michelle Gun Elephant chronology
| Chicken Zombies (1997) | Gear Blues (1998) | Casanova Snake (1999) |

Professional ratings
Review scores
| Source | Rating |
|---|---|
| AllMusic | 4/5 stars |
| NME | 4/5 stars |
| Sputnikmusic | 5/5 |

Gear Blues is an album by the band Thee Michelle Gun Elephant, released in 1998. It was released in the United States in 2000.

== Critical reception ==
NME wrote: "Armed with an arsenal of hooks, chiselled cheekbones and oodles of self belief, Thee Machine Gun Elephant are credible heirs to the garageland throne, and, if that wasn’t enough, a paragon of internationalism." LA Weekly thought that "vocalist Yusuke Chiba is a hoarsely authoritative presence, and bassist Koji Ueno and drummer Kazuyuki Kuhara have eliminated the Who-derived busyness of their early approach in favor of seamless, no-nonsense propulsion." Rolling Stone concluded that "the attention to visceral detail is what distinguishes Gear Blues from mere Nuggets and Brit-punk slavishness."

AllMusic wrote that "the album ends with a bittersweet, melancholy, space punk groove on 'Danny Go'."

== Track listing ==
1. "West Cabaret Drive" – 5:26
2. "Smokin' Billy" – 3:26
3. "Satanic Boom Boom Head" – 2:50
4. "Dog Way" – 3:15
5. "Free Devil Jam" – 2:42
6. "Killer Beach" – 5:10
7. "Brian Down" – 4:45
8. "Hotel Bronco" – 1:43
9. "Give the Gallon" – 5:15
10. "G.W.D." – 3:52
11. "Ash" – 3:34
12. "Soul Wrap" – 4:14
13. "Boiled Oil" – 4:10
14. "Danny Go" – 4:54
15. "Jenny" – 3:22

The European release does not contain "Jenny" but has an extra bonus disc with the tracks "Get Up Lucy" and "Cisco".
