= Sabrina No Heaven =

Studio album by Thee Michelle Gun Elephant
- Released: 2003
- Genre: Garage rock
- Length: 31:49
- Label: Island/Universal Music

Thee Michelle Gun Elephant chronology
Sabrina Heaven (2003)	Sabrina No Heaven (2003)

Sabrina No Heaven is an album by Thee Michelle Gun Elephant, released in 2003.

== Track listing ==
1. チェルシー - (Chelsea) - 7:38
2. ミッドナイト・クラクション・ベイビー - (Midnight Klaxon Baby) - 3:39
3. デッドマンズ・ギャラクシー・デイズ - (Deadman's Galaxy Days) - 3:52
4. 水色の水 - (Turquoise Water) - 6:40
5. "Pink" - 4:40
6. 夜が終わる（Instrumental） - (Night is Over) - 5:19

(Brackets are English translations)
