= The Imaginary (film) =

2023 Japanese animated film

- Theatrical release poster

Japanese name
- Kanji: 屋根裏のラジャー
Transcriptions
- Revised Hepburn: Yaneura no Rajā
- Directed by: Yoshiyuki Momose
- Screenplay by: Yoshiaki Nishimura
- Based on: The Imaginary by A.F. Harrold
- Produced by: Yoshiaki Nishimura
- Starring: Kokoro Terada; Rio Suzuki; Sakura Ando; Riisa Naka; Takayuki Yamada; Atsuko Takahata; Issey Ogata
- Cinematography: Susumu Fukushi
- Edited by: Toshihiko Kojima
- Music by: Kenji Tamai; Agehasprings
- Production company: Studio Ponoc
- Distributed by: Toho
- Release date: December 15, 2023
- Running time: 105 minutes
- Country: Japan
- Language: Japanese
- Box office: $478,300

The Imaginary (Japanese: 屋根裏のラジャー, Hepburn: Yaneura no Rajā; lit. 'Rudger in the Attic') is a 2023 Japanese animated fantasy film directed by Yoshiyuki Momose from a screenplay written by Yoshiaki Nishimura, who also produced the film, and animated by Studio Ponoc. Based on A.F. Harrold's 2014 novel of the same name, it is Studio Ponoc's first full-length animated film since Mary and the Witch's Flower (2017). The Japanese voice cast includes Kokoro Terada, Rio Suzuki, Sakura Ando, Riisa Naka, Takayuki Yamada, Atsuko Takahata and Issey Ogata. The narrative follows Rudger, an Imaginary, who spends his days delving into adventures crafted by his creator, Amanda. After a terrible accident separates them, Rudger is forced to confront an inexorable fate to which all Imaginaries are subject: dissolution with human forgetfulness.

The Imaginary is produced with hand-drawn animation. It was originally scheduled to be released between June and August 2022, but it was postponed due to production delays. It was theatrically released in Japan on December 15, 2023, and was released worldwide by Netflix on July 5, 2024. It received positive reviews from critics, who praised its animation, themes, screenplay and visuals.

== Plot ==
The film opens with Rudger, an invisible entity known as an Imaginary, in the midst of a colorful adventure conjured by his creator, Amanda Shuffleup. Their escapades are interrupted by Amanda's mother, Lizzie, who is exasperated by her daughter's aloof behavior and fixation on a friend who, as far as she can tell, does not exist.

While on a day trip with Lizzie, Amanda and Rudger encounter the menacing Mr. Bunting and his own Imaginary, a sullen girl in black. Revealing himself to be a hunter and devourer of exceptional Imaginaries, he decides Rudger is his next mark. As the two children flee from the man in a panic, Amanda is hit by a car, the accident appearing to be fatal.

Now alone, Rudger begins to disappear, since Imaginaries cease to exist once their creator forgets them. Zinzan, a mysterious cat, persuades the boy to follow him to a sanctuary for Imaginaries at risk of vanishing. The sanctuary is a real-life library, where Imaginaries are sustained by the creative energies of the books within. Among the dozens like himself, Rudger befriends the skeletal Cruncher-of-Bones, Snowflake the Hippo, and Emily, who is a leader among the library's inhabitants.

Over dinner that night, Rudger asks Emily about Mr. Bunting, and she explains that he was once a mortal human man who was so desperate to preserve his Imaginary, he resorted to consuming other Imaginaries, which has sustained the both of them for hundreds of years. At the conclusion of her story, she insists Bunting is nothing but a myth, much to Rudger's frustration.

The following morning, Emily tasks Rudger with his new job, where he'll spend the day with a child in need of pretend playmates. He selects John, one of Amanda's classmates, as his first assignment. At the end of the day, he spots Bunting lurking outside of John's home, and confronts him about Amanda coming to harm. Bunting does not accept the blame and attempts to capture Rudger, who narrowly escapes and takes refuge at Amanda's house. There, he observes Lizzie discovering Amanda's momentos of her late father, which reminds him that the man's death was the reason for his creation. He also learns that Amanda is alive in the hospital, though in critical condition.

After Bunting catches up with Rudger, Emily and Zinzan come to his rescue, but they all find themselves trapped in an imaginary world of Bunting's design. Though the party is able to track down an exit leading to the library, just before they cross the threshold, Bunting shoots Emily with a pretend gun, ending her life. Returning to the library, Rudger is horrified to discover everyone else has already forgotten about Emily.

Resolved to encourage Amanda to live, Rudger journeys to the hospital, but Bunting is already there waiting for him. Amanda is awoken from her coma by Rudger's voice and she engages Bunting in a battle of imagination. Lizzie arrives just as Bunting gains the upper hand by creating an enormous snake that slowly crushes Amanda. Unable to see the snake, Lizzie is initially powerless to stop it, but with Rudger and Amanda's help, she remembers her old Imaginary: a sheepdog named Fridge. After successfully calling Fridge, he incapacitates the snake and rescues Rudger from the vacuum of Bunting's maw. Bunting's Imaginary, apparently moved by Amanda and Rudger's bond, allows herself to be devoured instead. As she disappears, so too does Bunting, defeated for good. Safe at last, Rudger shares a tearful embrace with Lizzie and Fridge.

Sometime after Amanda is discharged from the hospital, Rudger is in the process of disappearing, but affirms that no matter where Amanda's life takes her, he'll always be a part of her. The two of them now ready to brave the future, they embark on one final adventure.

== Voice cast ==
Character	Japanese voice	English voice
Rudger	Kokoro Terada	Louie Rudge-Buchanan
Amanda Shuffleup	Rio Suzuki	Evie Kiszel
Elizabeth "Lizzie" Shuffleup	Sakura Ando	Hayley Atwell
Emily	Riisa Naka	Sky Katz
Zinzan (Jinzan)	Takayuki Yamada	Kal Penn
Downbeat Grandma	Atsuko Takahata	Jane Singer
Mr. Bunting	Issey Ogata	Jeremy Swift
Fridge (Reizōko)/The Old Dog	Akira Terao	LeVar Burton
Aurora	Hana Sugisaki	Ruby Barnhill
Snowflake (Koyuki)	Mitsuaki Kanuka	Roger Craig Smith
Cruncher-of-Bones	Teiya Ichiryusai	Courtenay Taylor

== Release ==
=== Box office ===
The film grossed 68,169,730 yen (about US$478,300) in its first three days.

=== Home media and streaming ===
==== Japan ====
The film was released on DVD, Blu-ray and 4K Ultra HD on May 15, 2024, by Walt Disney Japan.

==== Overseas ====
On January 25, 2024, Netflix announced that they had acquired worldwide streaming rights to the film, which was being added to the platform later in the year. The deal also included global streaming rights to the studio's future feature projects. In April, Netflix announced that the film will premiere on July 5 on the platform. The film received a limited theatrical run on June 28, 2024.

== Reception ==
On the review aggregator website Rotten Tomatoes, 91% of 82 critics' reviews are positive, with an average rating of 7.5/10. The website's consensus reads: "A visually splendid and emotionally resonant anime film that appeals to the child in everyone, The Imaginary is a flight of fancy that audiences won't mind getting swept up in." Based on 18 critics on Metacritic, the film has a weighted average score of 66 out of 100, indicating that it received generally positive reviews.

=== Awards ===
Year	Award	Category	Recipient(s)	Result	Ref.
2024	Asian Academy Creative Awards	Best Animation	The Imaginary	Won	
