= Thee Michelle Gun Elephant =

Japanese garage rock band

- Origin: Japan
- Genres: Garage rock Blues rock Punk blues
- Years active: 1991–2003
- Labels: Nippon Columbia; Universal Music Group; Alive Records
- Past members: Yusuke Chiba; Futoshi Abe; Kōji Ueno; Kazuyuki Kuhara
- Website: Rockin' Blues

Thee Michelle Gun Elephant (often abbreviated to TMGE) was a Japanese garage rock band formed in 1991. The band broke up in 2003.

== History ==
The band was formed in 1991, while Chiba, Ueno, and Kuhara were students at Tokyo's Meiji Gakuin University. They later drew influence from The Roosters. Their unusual name originated when a friend mispronounced the title of an early jam session recording; featuring cover songs of Thee Headcoats (one of the band's main influences) and from The Damned's album Machine Gun Etiquette. Some years later Futoshi Abe joined the band. After an independently released EP in 1995, they signed to Nippon Columbia's Triad label, releasing the album Cult Grass Stars in 1996, followed later that year by High Time, the band enjoying chart success in their home country. Chicken Zombies (1997) gave them a top five hit. The band's 1998 album Gear Blues was the first to be released in the US (in 2000). Several of their songs were also used in Blue Spring, a Japanese movie made in 2001.

The band announced that they would break up on October 11, 2003, after their Last Heaven tour of Japan. Guitarist Futoshi Abe died of an acute hematoma in July 2009, and vocalist Yusuke Chiba died due to complications of esophageal cancer in November 2023.

== Side projects ==
All four members have had other musical projects or played with other bands both while in TMGE and after its break-up. Some of these are as follows:

Yusuke Chiba (1968–2023)

- ROSSO (Vocals, Guitar and Songwriting on all releases)
- The Birthday (Vocals, Guitars and Songwriting on all releases)
- The Midwest Vikings (Vocals, Guitars and Songwriting under the alias 'LACOSTE')
- Raven
- Midnight Bankrobbers
- The Golden Wet Fingers
- Snake On The Beach (Solo project started in 2012)
- Tokyo Ska Paradise Orchestra (Vocals on one song on the album 'Stompin' On Down Beat Alley')
- Bugy Craxone (Vocals on one song, 'Hito to Hikari')

Kazuyuki Kuhara (1969– )

- ROSSO (Drums on some live appearances)
- The Birthday (Drums on all releases)
- The Midwest Vikings (Drums and Pianica under the alias 'HANG TEN')
- Yoko Utsumi's YOKOLOCO BAND (Drums on later releases)
- Shigeki Hamabe (Drums on first two albums)
- M.J.Q (drums on all releases)

Koji Ueno (1968– )

- Radio Caroline (Bass on all releases)
- The Hiatus (Bass on all releases)

Futoshi Abe (1966–2009)

- KOOLOGI (Guitar on first album)
- Barebones
- Strawberry Jean (Guitar - This was Futoshi Abe's pre-TMGE band)

== Discography ==
=== Albums ===
- Maximum! Maximum!! Maximum!!! (1993) Self-released
- Cult Grass Stars (1996) Triad
- High Time (1996) Triad
- Chicken Zombies (1997) Triad
- Gear Blues (1998) Triad
- Casanova Snake (2000) Triad
- Rodeo Tandem Beat Specter (2001) Triad
- Sabrina Heaven (2003) Island
- Sabrina No Heaven (2003) Island

=== Live albums ===
- Casanova Said "Live or Die" (2000) Triad
- Last Heaven's Bootleg (2003) Island

=== Singles ===
- Sekai no Owari (1996) Triad
- Candy House (1996) Triad
- Lily (1996) Triad
- Culture (1997) Triad
- Get Up Lucy (1997) Triad
- The Birdmen (1997) Triad
- G.W.D (1998) Triad
- Out Blues (1998) Triad
- Smokin' Billy (1998) Triad
- GT400 (2000) Triad
- Baby Stardust (2000) Triad
- Abakareta-Sekai (2001) Triad
- Taiyou wo Tsukande Shimatta (2002) Island
- Girl Friend (2003) Trippin' Elephant
- Electric Circus (2003) Island

=== B-sides compilations ===
- Rumble (1999) Triad

=== Best of compilations ===
- TMGE 106 (2000) Triad
- Collection (2001) Alive Records (US release)
- Grateful Triad Years (2002) Triad
- Thee Greatest Hits (2009) Columbia

=== Other releases ===
- Wonder Style (1995) Trippin' Elephant
- Wonder Style (reissue) (1997) Triad
- Vibe On! (1998) Trippin' Elephant
- Kwacker (with Mick Green) (2001) Trippin' Elephant

=== DVDs ===
TMGE have released a number of live and PV DVDs. A 10 disc live DVD box set titled 'THEE LIVE' was released by Nippon Columbia in January 2010.
