= Imaginary friend =

Psychological and social phenomenon

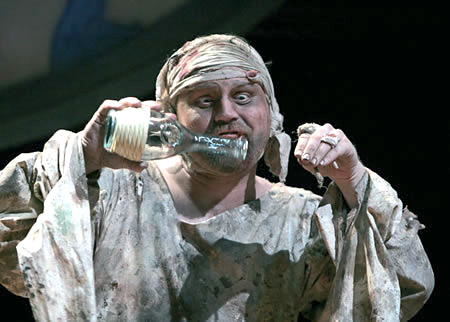
Caliban has a conversation with his imaginary friends in Folger Theatre's production of Shakespeare's The Tempest.

Imaginary friends (also known as pretend friends, invisible friends or made-up friends) are a psychological and a social phenomenon where a friendship or other interpersonal relationship takes place in the imagination rather than physical reality.

Although they may seem real to their creators, children usually understand that their imaginary friends are not real.

The first studies focusing on imaginary friends are believed to have been conducted during the 1890s. There is little research about the concept of imaginary friends in children's imaginations. Klausen and Passman (2007) report that imaginary companions were originally described as being supernatural creatures and spirits that were thought to connect people with their past lives. Adults in history have had entities such as household gods, guardian angels, and muses that functioned as imaginary companions to provide comfort, guidance and inspiration for creative work. It is possible the phenomenon appeared among children in the mid-19th century when childhood was emphasized as an important time for play and imagination.

== Description ==
In some studies, imaginary friends are defined as children impersonating a specific character (imagined by them), or objects or toys that are personified. However, some psychologists will define an imaginary friend only as a separate created character. Imaginary friends can be people, but they can also take the shape of other characters such as animals or other abstract ideas such as ghosts, monsters, robots, aliens or angels. These characters can be created at any point during a lifetime, though Western culture suggests they are most acceptable in preschool- and school-age children. Most research agrees that girls are more likely than boys to develop imaginary friends. Once children reach school age, boys and girls are equally likely to have an imaginary companion. Research has often reiterated that there is not a specific "type" of child that creates an imaginary friend. When children have fantasies, they may come to believe that some imaginary world exists in another universe or create an imaginary world for their imaginary friends to live in.

Research has shown that imaginary friends are a normative part of childhood and even adulthood. Additionally, some psychologists suggest that imaginary friends are much like a fictional character created by an author. As Eileen Kennedy-Moore points out, "Adult fiction writers often talk about their characters taking on a life of their own, which may be an analogous process to children’s invisible friends." In addition, Marjorie Taylor and her colleagues have found that fiction writers are more likely than average to have had imaginary friends as children.

There is a difference between the common imaginary friends that many children create, and the imaginary voices of psychopathology. Often when there’s a psychological disorder and any inner voices are present, they add negativity to the conversation. The person with the disorder may sometimes believe that the imagined voices are physically real, not an imagined inner dialog.

Imaginary friends can serve various functions. Playing with imaginary friends enables children to enact behaviors and events they have not yet experienced. Imaginary play allows children to use their imagination to construct knowledge of the world. In addition, imaginary friends might also fulfill children's innate desire to connect with others before actual play among peers is common. According to psychologist Lev Vygotsky, cultural tools and interaction with people mediate psychological functioning and cognitive development. Imaginary friends, perceived as real beings, could teach children how to interact with others along with many other social skills. Vygotsky's sociocultural view of child development includes the notion of children's “zone of proximal development,” which is the difference between what children can do with and without help. Imaginary friends can aid children in learning things about the world that they could not learn without help, such as appropriate social behavior, and thus can act as a scaffold for children to achieve slightly above their social capability.

In addition, imaginary friends also serve as a means for children to experiment with and explore the world. In this sense, imaginary companions also relate to Piaget's theory of child development because they are completely constructed by the child. According to Piaget, children are scientific problem solvers who self-construct experiences and build internal mental structures based on experimentation. The creation of and interaction with imaginary companions helps children to build such mental structures. The relationship between a child and their imaginary friend can serve as a catalyst for the formation of real relationships in later development and thus provides a head start to practising real-life interaction.

== Research ==
It has been theorized that children with imaginary friends may develop language skills and retain knowledge faster than children without them, which may be because these children get more linguistic practice than their peers as a result of carrying out "conversations" with their imaginary friends.

Kutner (n.d.) reported that 65% of 7-year-old children report they have had an imaginary companion at some point in their lives. He further reported:

Imaginary friends are an integral part of many children's lives. They provide comfort in times of stress, companionship when they're lonely, someone to boss around when they feel powerless, and someone to blame for the broken lamp in the living room. Most important, an imaginary companion is a tool young children use to help them make sense of the adult world.

Taylor, Carlson & Gerow (c2001: p. 190) hold that:

despite some results suggesting that children with imaginary friends might be superior in intelligence, it is not true that all intelligent children create them.

If imaginary friends can provide assistance to children in developing their social skills, they must function as important roles in the lives of children. Hoff (2004 – 2005) was interested in finding out the roles and functions of imaginary friends and how they impacted the lives of children. The results of her study have provided some significant insight on the roles of imaginary friends. Many of the children reported their imaginary friends as being sources of comfort in times of boredom and loneliness. Another interesting result was that imaginary friends served to be mentors for children in their academics. They were encouraging, provided motivation, and increased the self-esteem of children when they did well in school. Finally, imaginary friends were reported as being moral guides for children. Many of the children reported that their imaginary friends served as a conscience and helped them to make the correct decision in times where morality was questioned.

Other professionals such as Marjorie Taylor feel imaginary friends are common among school-age children and are part of normal social-cognitive development. Part of the reason people believed children gave up imaginary companions earlier than has been observed is related to Piaget's stages of cognitive development. Piaget suggested that imaginary companions disappeared once children entered the concrete operational stage of development. Marjorie Taylor identified middle school children with imaginary friends and followed up six years later as they were completing high school. At follow-up, those who had imaginary friends in middle school displayed better coping strategies but a "low social preference for peers." She suggested that imaginary friends may directly benefit children's resiliency and positive adjustment. Because imagination play with a character involves the child often imagining how another person (or character) would act, research has been done to determine if having an imaginary companion has a positive effect on theory of mind development. In a previous study, Taylor & Carlson (1997) found that 4-year-old children who had imaginary friends scored higher on emotional understanding measures and that having a theory of mind would predict higher emotional understanding later on in life. When children develop the realization that other people have different thoughts and beliefs other than their own, they are able to grow in their development of theory of mind as they begin to have better understandings of emotions.

=== Positive psychology ===
The article "Pretend play and positive psychology: Natural companions" defined many great tools that are seen in children who engage pretend play. These five areas include creativity, coping, emotion regulation, empathy/emotional understanding and hope. Hope seems to be the underlying tool children use in motivation. Children become more motivated when they believe in themselves, therefore children will not be discouraged to come up with different ways of thinking because they will have confidence. Imaginary companionship displays immense creativity helping them to develop their social skills and creativity is frequently discussed term amongst positive psychology.

An imaginary companion can be considered the product of the child's creativity whereas the communication between the imaginary friend and the child is considered to be the process.

=== Adolescence ===
"Imaginary companions in adolescence: sign of a deficient or positive development?" explores the extent to which adolescents create imaginary companions. The researchers explored the prevalence of imaginary companions in adolescence by investigating the diaries of adolescents age 12–17. In addition they looked at the characteristics of these imaginary companions and did a content analysis of the data obtained in the diaries. There were three hypotheses tested: (1) the deficit hypothesis, (2) the giftedness hypothesis, (3) the egocentrism hypothesis. The results of their study concluded that creative and socially competent adolescents with great coping skills were particularly prone to the creation of these imaginary friends. These findings did not support the deficit hypothesis or egocentrism hypothesis, further suggesting that these imaginary companions were not created with the aim to replace or substitute a real-life family member or friend, but they simply created another "very special friend". This is surprising because it is usually assumed that children who create imaginary companions have deficits of some sort, and it is unheard of for an adolescent to have an imaginary companion.

==== Tulpa ====
Following the popularizing and secularizing of the concept of tulpa in the Western world, these practitioners, calling themselves "tulpamancers", report an improvement to their personal lives through the practice, and new unusual sensory experiences. Some practitioners report to have sexual and romantic interactions with the tulpa, though the practice is considered taboo. A survey of the community with 118 respondents on the explanation of tulpas found 8.5% support a metaphysical explanation, 76.5% support a neurological or psychological explanation, and 14% "other" explanations. Nearly all practitioners consider the tulpa a real or somewhat-real person. The number of active participants in these online communities is usually in the low hundreds per community, and few known meetings in person have taken place.

=== Birth order ===
To uncover the origin of imaginary companions and learn more about the children who create them, it is necessary to seek out children who have created imaginary companions. Unfortunately young children cannot accurately self-report, therefore the most effective way to gather information about children and their imaginary companions is by interviewing the people who spend the most time with them. Often mothers are the primary caretakers who spend the most time with a child. Therefore, for this study 78 mothers were interviewed and asked whether their child had an imaginary friend. If the mother revealed that their child did not have an imaginary companion then the researcher asked about the child's tendency to personify objects.

In order to convey the meaning of personified objects the researchers explained to the mothers that it is common for children to choose a specific toy or object that they are particularly attached to or fond of. For the object to qualify as a personified object the child had to treat it as animate. Furthermore, it is necessary to reveal what children consider an imaginary friend or pretend play. In order to distinguish a child having or not having an imaginary companion, the friend had to be in existence for at least one month. In order to examine the developmental significance of preschool children and their imaginary companions the mothers of children were interviewed. The major conclusion from the study was that there is a significant distinction between invisible companions and personified objects.

A significant finding in this study was the role of the child's birth order in the family in terms of having an imaginary companion or not. The results of the interviews with mothers indicated that children with imaginary friends were more likely to be a first-born child when compared to children who did not have an imaginary companion at all. This study further supports that children may create imaginary friends to work on social development. The findings that a first-born child is more likely to have an imaginary friend sheds some light on the idea that the child needs to socialize therefore they create the imaginary friend to develop their social skills. This is an extremely creative way for children to develop their social skills and creativity is frequently discussed term amongst positive psychology. An imaginary companion can be considered the product of creativity whereas the communication between the imaginary friend and the child is the process.

In regards to birth order there is also research on children who do not have any siblings at all. The research in this area further investigates the notion that children create imaginary companions due to the absence of peer relationships. A study that examined the differences in self-talk frequency as a function of age, only-child, and imaginary childhood companion status provides a insight to the commonalties of children with imaginary companions. The researchers collected information from college students who were asked if they ever had an imaginary friend as a child (Brinthaupt & Dove, 2012). There were three trials in the study and the researchers found that there were significant differences in self-talk between different age groupings.

Their first trial indicated that only children who create imaginary companions actually engage in high levels of positive self-talk had more positive social development. They also found that women were more likely than men to have had an imaginary companion. Their findings were consistent with other research which suggests that it is more common for females to have imaginary companions. The researchers suggested that women may be more likely to have imaginary companions because they are more likely to rely on feedback from persons other than themselves, thus supporting the theory that men have more self-reinforcing self-talk.

Furthermore, other research has concluded that women seek more social support than men, which could be another possibility for creating these imaginary companions. The second trial found that children without siblings reported more self-talk than children with siblings; the third trial found that the students who reported having an imaginary friend also reported more self-talk than the other students who did not have imaginary friends. When self-talk is negative, it is associated with effects such as increased anxiety and depression. The researchers concluded that "individuals with higher levels of social-assessment and critical self-talk reported lower self-esteem and more frequent automatic negative self-statements." When self-talk is positive, however, the study found that "people with higher levels of self-reinforcing self-talk reported more positive self-esteem and more frequent automatic positive self-statements".

== See also ==
- Bicameral mentality – Hypothesis in psychology
- List of imaginary characters in fiction
- Paracosm – Detailed imaginary world
- Superstition – Belief or behavior that is considered irrational or supernatural
- Tulpa – Entity manifesting from mental powers
