= The Imaginary (novel) =

Children's book

- First edition (UK)
- Author: A. F. Harrold
- Illustrator: Emily Gravett
- Cover artist: Emily Gravett
- Language: English
- Genre: Children's novel
- Published: October 2014 (Bloomsbury)
- Publication place: England
- Media type: Print (hardback)
- Pages: 220
- ISBN: 9781408852460
- OCLC: 887936791

The Imaginary is a 2014 British children's novel written by A. F. Harrold. It was illustrated by Emily Gravett. It is about a young girl, Amanda, and her imaginary friend, Rudger. An anime film adaptation by Studio Ponoc was released in 2023.

== Reception ==
A review in the Booklist of The Imaginary wrote "Though not quite as innovative as it might be, this is nevertheless a winningly whimsical celebration of the imagination, beautifully enhanced by both black-and-white and full-color illustrations by Kate Greenaway Medal-winning Gravett." and, in a starred review, Kirkus Reviews found it "Wonderfully entertaining."

The Imaginary has also been reviewed by The New York Times, the School Library Journal, The Horn Book Magazine, Publishers Weekly, Library Media Connection, Common Sense Media, Reading Time, The Bulletin of the Center for Children's Books, the Financial Times, and The Guardian (child review).

It was nominated for the 2016 Carnegie Medal, the 2016 Kate Greenaway Medal, and won the 2015 British Book Design and Production Awards Children's Trade Book Award, and the 2015 British Book Design and Production Awards Book of the Year Award.
