= Pornostar (film) =

- Theatrical release poster
- Directed by: Toshiaki Toyoda
- Written by: Toshiaki Toyoda
- Produced by: Miyoshi Kikuchi; Masakazu Takei
- Starring: Akaji Maro; Kiyohiko Shibukawa; Koji Chihara; Onimaru; Rin Ozawa
- Cinematography: Norimichi Kasamatsu
- Edited by: Toshihide Hukano
- Production company: Little More
- Release date: October 10, 1998 (Japan)
- Running time: 98 minutes
- Country: Japan
- Language: Japanese

Pornostar (Japanese: ポルノスター, Hepburn: Porunostā), also released as Tokyo Rampage, is a 1998 Japanese drama film directed by Toshiaki Toyoda. The film was released on October 10, 1998.

== Cast ==
- Akaji Maro as Yakuza boss
- Kiyohiko Shibukawa
- Koji Chihara as Arano
- Onimaru as Kamijo
- Rin Ozawa

== Reception ==
Tom Mes of Midnight Eye wrote that "Pornostar is not a flawless film, but it's one of those debut features that while being noticeably underdeveloped nevertheless shows a great amount of promise in its director."
