= Rodeo Tandem Beat Specter =

Studio album by Thee Michelle Gun Elephant
- Released: 2001
- Genre: Garage rock
- Length: 56:15
- Label: Alive

Thee Michelle Gun Elephant chronology
Collection (2001)	Rodeo Tandem Beat Specter (2001)	Sabrina Heaven (2003)

Professional ratings
Review scores
Source	Rating
AllMusic	3/5 stars

Rodeo Tandem Beat Specter is an album by Thee Michelle Gun Elephant, released in 2001.

== Track listing ==
1. "CITROËN NO KODOKU (The Loneliness of The Citroën)" – 5:42
2. "Alligator Night" – 3:07
3. "ABAKARETA SEKAI (The World Exposed)" – 3:44
4. "God Jazz Time" – 5:00
5. "Baby Stardust" – 3:17
6. "Rita" – 4:22
7. "Beat Specter Buchanan" – 2:17
8. "Mona Lisa" – 6:28
9. "Turkey" – 3:43
10. "BREAK HAZURETA ORENO SHINZOU (My Heart With Its Brakes Broken Loose)" – 3:02
11. "Margaret" – 4:04
12. "Bird Land Cindy" – 3:46
13. "Beat Specter Garcia" – 1:57
14. "The Redhead Kelly" – 5:40
