= The Eighth Day (Kakuta novel) =

2007 novel by Mitsuyo Kakuta

- Author: Mitsuyo Kakuta
- Translator: Margaret Mitsutani
- Language: English
- Publisher: Kodansha
- Publication date: 2007
- Publication place: Japan
- ISBN: 9784770030887

The Eighth Day (or Yokame no semi, 八日目の蟬 in kanji) is a 2007 Japanese language novel by Japanese author Mitsuyo Kakuta. It was translated into English by Margaret Mitsutani in 2010. The book is known for its characterization of women especially. It was later adapted into a TV drama, and then as a film in 2011. The author received the 2007 Chūō Kōron Literary Prize (中央公論文芸賞) for the novel.

== Synopsis ==
The novel, told through a brief prologue and two "chapters", follows Nonomiya Kiwako and a baby she kidnaps, Erina Akiyama.

Chapter 0
A prologue with only 3 pages in English publication. The impulse of kidnapping a six month old baby of Kiwako's former lover (Takehiro) who deceived her into abortion.
Chapter 1
Year 1985. Story of Nonomiya Kiwako during the three-and-a-half-year escape: from Tokyo, Nagoya, Angel Home which is a women-only commune hosted by a religious cult, and finally Shodoshima. Kiwako treats the baby as her child with love and care, and name her as Kaoru. Kiwako and Kaoru, which is Erina, found peace at Shodoshima but Kiwako was arrested there. This chapter is dated in chronological order.
Chapter 2
Year 2005. As an adult, Erina became pregnant like Kiwako while dating Kishida, who had a wife and children, and Kishida was unreliable like Takehiro. Chigusa Ando, who was Erina's childhood friend when they live in Angel Home, appeared before Erina. They start their journey to confront their past, and their discovery are fragmented and unstructured.

== Reception ==
The novel was reviewed in the literary magazine Shōsetsu Tripper, and the English translation was reviewed in Metropolis.

== Film adaptation ==
The film focus on Chapter 2 of the novel. As the protagonist, Erina Akiyama cannot find peace with her family and starts a journey to confront her past. She makes a life-changing decision after discovered what is important to her, which is her rebirth.
