= Saya Zamurai =

2010 film by Hitoshi Matsumoto

- Film poster
- Directed by: Hitoshi Matsumoto
- Screenplay by: Hitoshi Matsumoto; Mitsuyoshi Takasu; Itsuji Itao; Tomoji Hasegawa; Kōji Ema; Mitsuru Kuramoto
- Story by: Hitoshi Matsumoto
- Produced by: Keisuke Konishi; Go Matsuoka; Ryōhei Naka; Akihiko Okamoto
- Starring: Takaaki Nomi; Sea Kumada; Jun Kunimura; Masato Ibu; Itsuji Itao
- Cinematography: Ryuto Kondo
- Edited by: Yoshitaka Honda
- Music by: Yasuaki Shimizu
- Production company: Yoshimoto Kogyo
- Release date: 11 June 2011 (Japan)
- Running time: 103 minutes
- Country: Japan
- Language: Japanese

Saya Zamurai (Japanese: さや侍, Hepburn: Scabbard Samurai) is a 2011 Japanese comedy film directed and co-written by Hitoshi Matsumoto. The film was exhibited at the 64th Locarno International Film Festival.

== Plot ==
In a forest in feudal Japan, a man with a price on his head and a little girl are on the run. He is Kanjuro Nomi, a samurai who wears an empty scabbard because he has lost his sword and with it his honour, while she is his daughter Tae. Surviving several assassination attempts by bounty hunters, he is captured by a rival clan and sentenced to The Thirty Days. This practice has arisen because the little crown prince has not laughed since his mother died in the epidemic that also carried off Nomi's wife. Condemned criminals are allowed 30 days to win their freedom if they can amuse the boy. If not, they are executed, which for a samurai like Nomi is by seppuku.

Nomi devises various stunts which do not amuse anybody and, as the days tick by, his daughter and his guards try to improve his performances. She has the idea of allowing the public into the palace to cheer him on, and she also sneaks into the depressed little prince's bedroom to try to gain his sympathy. But Nomi's efforts are just not funny, and with every failure he loses more dignity. The noble warrior is reduced to a sad clown who, though everybody wants him to succeed, manages to disappoint them every time. After 30 futile days, he has to perform the ritual public disembowelling.

On the way to execution, he slips a note to a supposedly blind monk. This man follows Tae as she roams disconsolate through the country and reads it to her. In his last testament, Nomi defies death and exhorts her to embrace life in a world that will go on.

== Cast ==
- Kanjuro Nomi: Takaaki Nomi
- Tae: Sea Kumada
- Lord: Jun Kunimura
- Lord's aide: Masato Ibu
- Koranosuke: Itsuji Itao
- Heikichi: Tokio Emoto
- O'Ryu, musician assassin: Ryo
- Gori-Gori, chiropractor assassin: Zennosuke Fukkin
- Pakyun, two-pistols assassin: Rolly
- Monk: Kazuo Takehara
