= Tetsuo Harada =

Japanese artist (1949–2024)

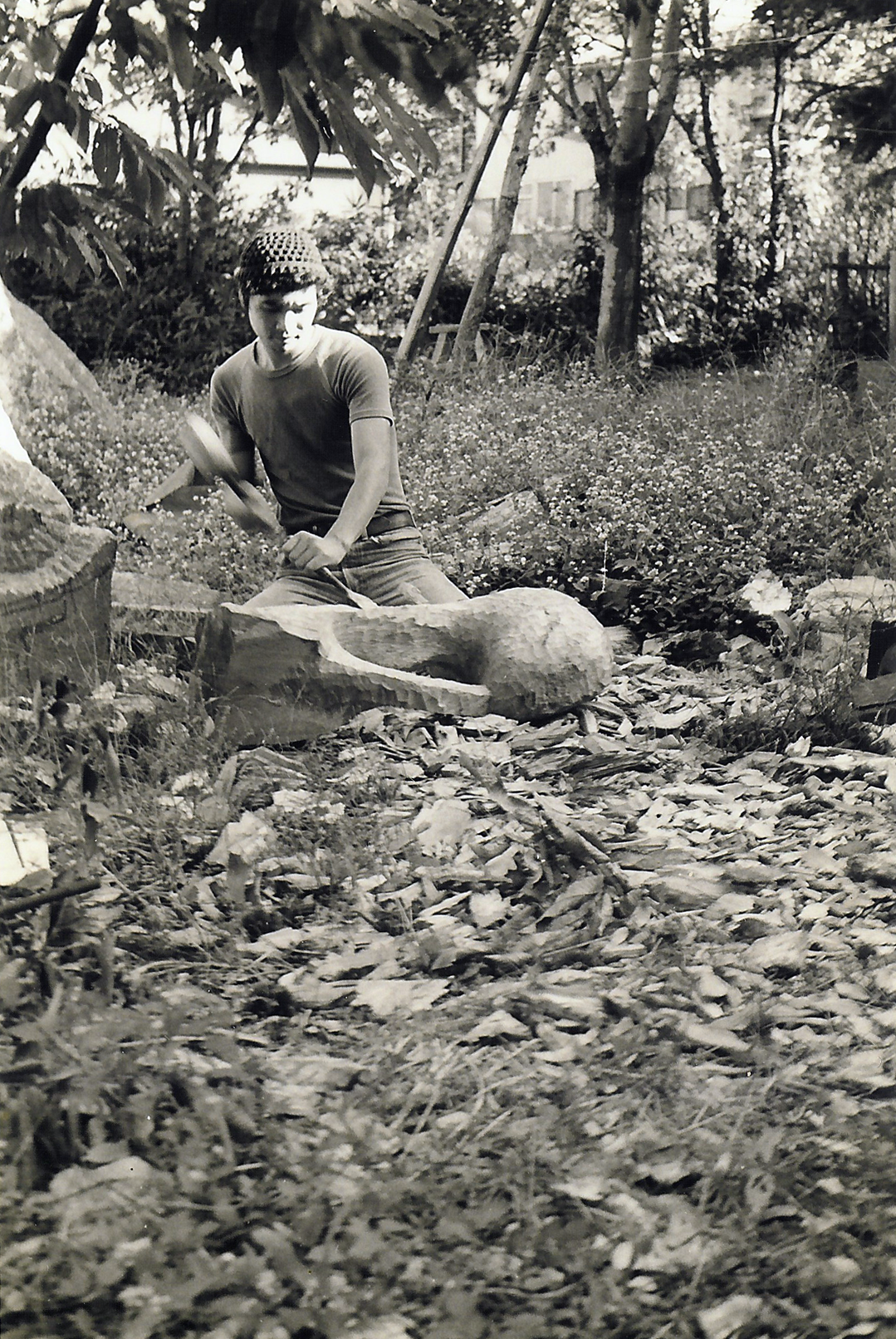
Tetsuo Harada at Tamabi Tokyo Fine Art University sculpting "Declaration for Look" 1972.

Tetsuo Harada (原田 哲男, Harada Tetsuo; 25 August 1949 – 23 November 2024) was a Japanese-French artist based in France, well known for his monumental direct carving sculptures on granite and marble. In the 1990s he came to much recognition with his "Earth Weaving" theme, binding nations in fraternity with granite rings. He explored a wide universe of materials (wood, metal, bronze, resin, glass) and shapes but the themes of pacifism, Nature (earth), sexuality and fertility remain prevalent (some advocate his shinto influences). His sculptures can be seen around the world in private collections, museums and the streets as monumental public works, or ephemeral Land-art installations. His work is often linked to that of Isamu Noguchi, Constantin Brâncuși, Barbara Hepworth, Henry Moore or the biomorphic aesthetic movement in general. He studied at Tamabi University Tokyo with Professor Tatehata, Beaux-arts de Paris with Professor Colamarigny, Jean Cardot fr:Jean Cardot. He lived and worked mostly in Paris, France, and carved granite in his large studio in Fresnay l'Eveque near Chartres in the Beauce area, Eure et Loir region. He produced quantities of sketches, drawings and paintings, as finished art piece or researches for future sculptures. In late years his work was promoted actively by his wife Annie Harada and his second son Cesar Minoru Harada, now student at the Royal College of Art. His first son Narito Harada is a lawyer specialized in Environment working for NGO like Greenpeace. Tetsuo Harada taught fine art and urban design at the National Superior Architecture School of Versailles (ENSAV), from which for 30 years he was establishing educational programs and cultural bridges between Asian Universities and European Universities.

== Biography and work ==
After the Second World War Harada was born in a small village called Niitsu surrounded by rice fields (now turned into the actual city of Niigata). The Harada Family, were farmers, his father became a blacksmith then worked to construct buildings using metal structures. His first brother Shigeo became the chairman and now his son Hisao manages it. He is an architect. Niichiro and Kikuno Harada had 3 boys and 3 girls, Tetsuo was the 6th. His father was the chairman of the "Harada Tekojio" and he understood well the importance of education, so Niichiro Harada allowed him to buy any books he wanted to provide for his education choosing at the same time the directions that he wanted to take. Well involved in Art, "Tetsuo" means Philosopher, studies music like jazz, songs, learn guitar by himself and sing in a group of friends, interpreting the Beatles. Tetsuo was attracted by art history, sculpture, painters, architecture.

=== Education, Influences ===
Studies

- Niitsu koko is the high school where Tetsuo studied drawings under the teaching of Professor Nitta Sensei. To go to study to Tokyo was a chance to progress his own wishes
- Graduate Tamabi Fine Arts University at Tokyo Japan (1968–1971). Tatehata Sensei was one of his teachers.
- Graduate teacher in plastic art (1971), he was teaching one year in a Highschool.
- Ecole Superieure des Beaux Arts de Paris E.N.S.B.A. (1973–1975), direct carving atelier of Professor Colamarigny, then Jean Cardot.

Tetsuo Harada's work is often compared to that of Constantin Brâncuși, Isamu Noguchi, Barbara Hepworth, Henry Moore.

=== Life in Japan ===
Teaching: Tetsuo Harada studied in high school to "Niitsu Koko", he learned drawing with his professor Nitta Sensei. He graduated from Tokyo Tamabi Fine Arts University where he received academic training in sculpture (art history, drawing, modeling, pattern, pottery, casting, curving wood, granite, marble...) In 1969, he participated at a symposium on wood sculpture near Tazawako Lake, Akita, Japan, organized by sculptors Watanabe and Koyanagi. He created a monumental sculpture in wood "The bird" 250 cm high. Also participating, Mazuda, Hochiiho, Sakaï, Tsuboï. At the Salon of Kodo Bijutsu Kyokaï in Tokyo, he presented "The bird" a low relief in ceramic (150 x 120 cm). In a group exhibition in Niitsu, he presented "The bird" in ceramic and "The birds" low relief in plaster. In 1970 he carved a monumental sculpture in white granite "Silence and the sea" (150 x 90 x 70). In 1971 he was graduate as professor of Fine Arts at the Tama Fine Art University of Tokyo. At the Nirenoki Gallery in Tokyo he exhibited with sculptor Tsuboi, showing "Mother and child" in granite 60 x 50 x 60, "Matches" cast metal 40 x 34 x 15, "Rhythm" in polyester and cast metal 90 x 85 x 90, "Parallel Thoughts" in wood, "Declaration" in wood, "Composition" in green granite. He is the winner of the third prize of the "Kodo Bijutsu Kyokai" with "Work 71" 180 x 170 x 100, in black granite (Takahashi collection in Sado Island). In 1972 he taught Fine Arts in the Technical High School in Takada near Niigata. He studied Japanese garden, tea ceremony, member of a music band. With Tsuboï they exhibited at the Tokiwa gallery, he showed "Lotus" in metal, "Balance" in iron and polyester, "Composition" in green granite, "Union" in iron, "Lotus Leaf" in iron, "Peace" low-relief in aluminum, "Declaration For Look" in wood. At the salon Kodo Bijutsu Kyokaï, third participation, he presented "Composition" in black granite. He had personal exhibitions at the Oshima gallery, Joetsu, Niigata in Japan. By selling artworks he would like to study in Europe.

=== Arrival in Europe ===
In 1973, he traveled throughout Europe. In France he visited Paris, Chartres, the south of France, Switzerland, Germany, worked in Italy at the Nicoli studio in Carrare, met Japanese artists, painters, sculptors Taniguchi, Hihara, Kiomizu, Mickael Esbin and shared life with them. He studied at "Ecole Nationale Superieure des Beaux Arts de Paris, direct carving at atelier Colamarigny and Jean Cardot. So after a while he decided to live in Paris and rent a flat near Place Clichy. His dream was to try to earn his living as an artist which was a real challenge. To give him a chance to hold up, he threw his return plane ticket in the Seine river. During the winter of 1973–1974 he built his sculpture "Prophetie" in cast cement in a studio in Meudon, which he exhibited at the Salon de la Jeune Sculpture in the gardens of the Champs Elysees in Paris.

=== Death ===
Harada died on 23 November 2024, at the age of 75.

== Political, social ==
During the summer 1974, Tetsuo Harada took part in a symposium organized by the gallery Monika Beck for the city of Homburg, Saarland Germany. He carved an Italian marble making "Die Hand von Buddhas" (The Buddha's Hand) 220x140x75cm installed in the city. It is his first monumental sculpture in Europe, an ode to Peace, in reaction to the Berlin Wall, separating East and West Germany. For Tetsuo Harada it is his first symbolic act to bring Orient and Occident, Buddhism and Catholicism together.

He met Pedro Tramullas sculptor who quickly became his friend while living in Paris and Jaca in Spain. Tramullas' father was a painter and his family suffered in Francoist Spain: Pedro organised in 1975 the first international symposium of sculpture in Siresa-Hecho. Beside the Pyrenees, in the sculpture garden of Hecho, alongside Bonnard, Johner, Lesne, Miska, Tramullas, Vernier, Yamahata, Harada curved in two grey marble "La mano de la Paz", H160x240x110cm protesting against the dictatorship.

Memorial In 1985, the city of Nanterre 92 (near Paris) organized a competition for the making of a monumental tribute, memorial to the Resistance and the Deportation. Out of 77 international participants, Harada won and carved two columns of Breton blue granite H450cm, firmly erected symbolizing the two victorious World Wars. On one hand two large "V" engraved successively in the columns are the signs of victories, but on the other hand the columns strewn over pebbles, representing the millions of victims killed during the two wars, without whom these victories would not have been possible.

=== Earth Weaving, le Tricot de la terre ===
1993 Earth Weaving UNION: The work of Harada is about shapes but mainly connections, relations. A whole art of relation that disarms the apparent dialectic of his production between simplicity and complexity. The creative act turns over itself like a glove, and questions its birth, pointing at the immanence and the fundamental tautology of creation. Harada declines this theme at various levels :

- the union between artwork and nature or city,
- the union between artwork and the beings,
- the friendship of people, from the fusion of feelings to the fusion of cultures.

A long list of countries attest to this cosmopolitism : Japan, the United States, India, France, Greece, Germany, Spain, Italy, Thailand, Spain, Denmark, the Netherlands, Israel, ... but also, among hundreds, regions and landscapes : Tuscany, Brittany, the Ardennes, the Beauce... or cities : Paris, New-York, Tokyo, Kyoto, Firense, Pietrasanta, Niigata, Lisbon, Athens, Leiden...

==== The 38th Parallel ====
The city of Kajigawa, Niigata, Japan, is located on the 38th parallel north (latitude).

This is a public commission that is precisely on the 38th Parallel. This is the line that divided the two Koreas and the art piece as well. He wanted to show this border and, at the same time, link the two blocs with a sphere. He wanted to symbolize the act of getting over the feud. It represents a dream of peace: This sculpture is a part of the Earth Weaving project.

In 1992 Tetsuo Harada won the international competition. The 38th Parallel has an axe 100 meters long. The two blocks of the pyramid meet exactly at the 38th parallel and are united by a Sphere. On the floor a large granite ring. On the right side of the pyramid a column is erected. The Earth Weaving links welding pyramid and ground, keeping the philosophy of Tetsuo Harada artwork. Dimensions. Column H 400 cm, sphere diameter 120 cm, floor 570 x 500 cm = 28.5m2, around 35 tonnes, in Breton pink granite carved in France and transported by boat to Japan. As well as Tetsuo Harada, the city of Kajigawa and the Equipment Ministry who commissioned the sculpture, wish to convey this message for peace. They invite other cities in the world located on the 38th parallel to express that hope by culture, art or sports.

==== Earth Weaving Olympic Games ====
In 1991 the Alberville city – Savoie – France has organized an international competition, Tetsuo Harada won facing 46 candidates. The monumental red granite sculpture should be at the entrance of the City. The idea was as follows: column powerful is a symbol of strength and righteousness. The international event translated by a large globe based on a pyramid form divine, also exploit the fruit of men. This composition is a significant mind and soul of sportsmen and links the spirit of games. The 5 pink granite blocks had been extracted from the careers for this order. But because of financial problems, the project has not been completed. It was a bitter episode in the career of the sculptor.

==== Olympic Games 2004 ====
The City of Athens in Greece with the Curator Maria Polychronopoulos for Kifisia and Skironio Art Museums, also located on the 38th parallel, has adopted the theme "38th parallel horizon" for the artistic and cultural Olympic Games. They were working with many 38th Parallel countries artists, that Harada encouraged. The 38th Parallel walks through: Italy, Spain, Portugal, Turkey, Iran, Turkmenistan, Tajikistan, China, Korea, Japan, California, Utah, Colorado, Kansas, Indiana, Kentucky, Virginia.

=== Interbreeding ===
From this human and geographical development, from his own family, beautifully mix-raced, from his itinerary made of teaching and sharing, Harada builds up the arguments of an initiatory route :
-a life and a work of art like a metaphor in progress, convening in curious alchemy the union of art and the forms of union,
-a path of sympathy with the world and the things as well as the beings, that probably is ' environment-art '.
Though this path undeniably and essentially belongs to sculpture, it carries along close ties with landscape art, architecture and urbanism. One of Harada's adventures is particularly representative of this aspect of his work : the cycle of the Earth Weaving, a huge and protean sculpture supposed to traverse the globe and spring up from the earth bringing a message of peace; its most spectacular emergence is the Tazawako dam in Japan.

=== Early Formal Experimentations ===
Mineral Garden
This sculpture is a 80m2 mineral garden, a signposting sculpture landscape composed of pavement, pebbles and sculpture.
There is a superimposition of three granite blocks that form a five meters high column : In Japan, it is impossible to build such a tall and heavy sculpture because of earthquakes.
In 1989, for "Hôtel des Impôts" of Saint Brieuc, Brittany region, he carved a landscape sculpture "Mineral garden" on the Earth Weaving concept. 47 tons of pink granite, totems of 5 meters, 80 m2 pavement in pink granite, pyramid, steps, ring tied with the Earth. Organized by the Ministry of Economy and Finance, with architect Caron in Nantes.

HARADA, Environment-art : an art of union and relation.
To try and grasp architecture or sculpture simply through shapes would not lead to a clear understanding of the meaning and the sensation they convey : it would amount to forgetting, on the one hand, that the empty space has a meaning and on the other hand, that the meaning not only lies in space as such, but also in its occupancy, in the relations that emanate from it.

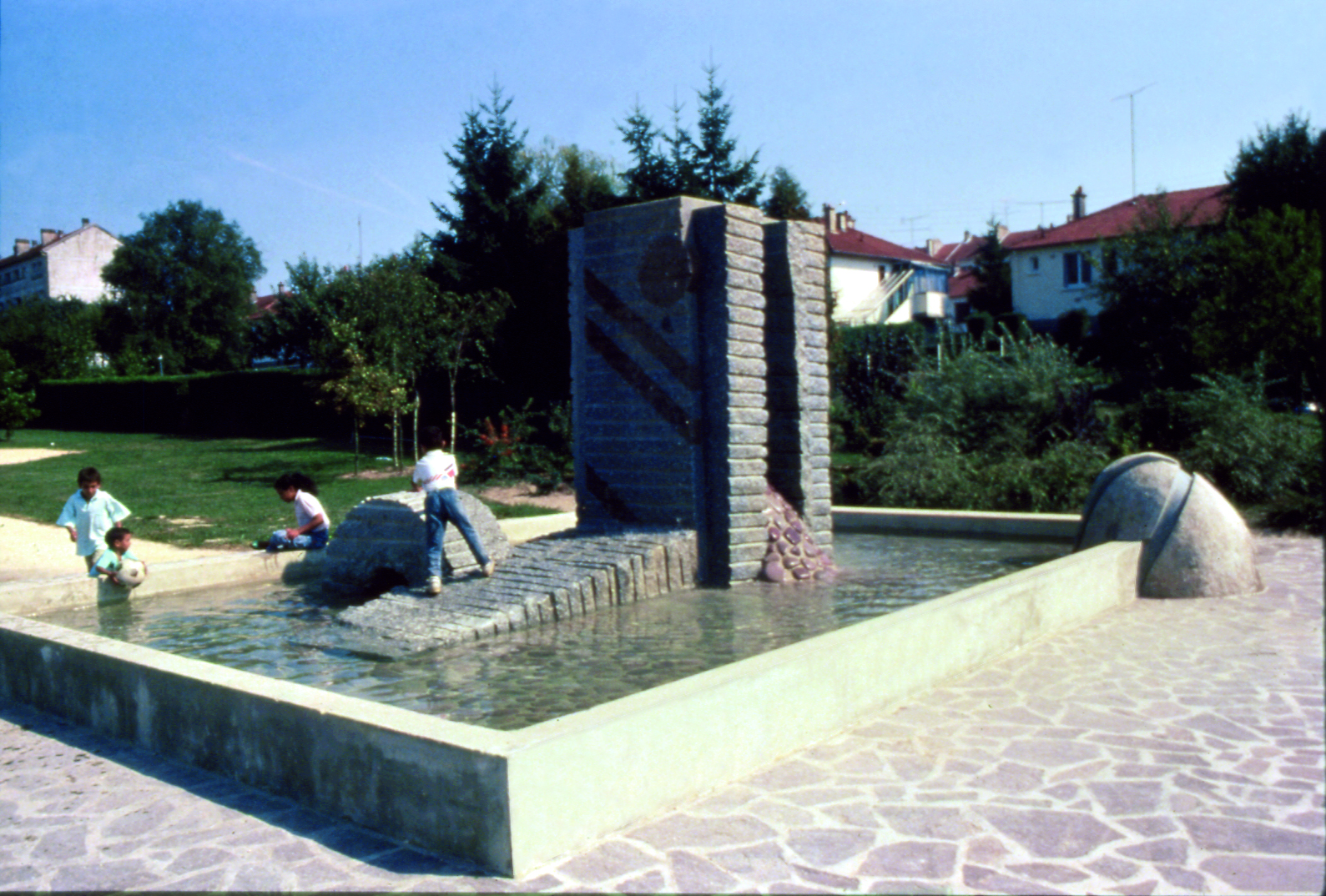
Tetsuo Harada Sainte-Menehould (France)

Fountain
For the sculpture I wanted to make something welcoming, a place where the kids would play and an art piece that adults could easily INTEGRATE in their environment. I mixed grey granite from the Tarn and some pink "de la clarte", which blends the sculpture with its context by reference to a typical architectural pattern of Sainte Memehould : diagonal lines of brick and limestone.
In 1986 he realizes a Fountain placed in the quartier des Vertes Voyes in Sainte Menehould, Champagne, France. Organized by the Ministry of Education and the City of Sainte Ménéhould. Directe carving in grey granite encrusted with pink granite. H 300 cm, basins 800 cm x 600 cm, pebbles. Totems H 300 cm.

Theatrical sculpture
For this sculpture I used raw materials. I wanted to play with the architecture of the location, create a harmony with the surroundings, make the sculpture follow the inclination of the roof. It is a dry fountain, a meeting place, to welcome people of exchange and communication. This artwork is also on the Earth Weaving concept. I carved Fountain in 1989 for the high school "Highschool Basse-Goulaine" in Loire-Atlantique, France. Organized by the Ministry of Education, with architect Pélerin in Nantes. First part : 4 blocks H 300, 250, 240, 210 cm and a square dry basin 750 x 750 cm in pink granite, for pupils to gather.

Prophecy
He called his sculpture "prophecy" in terms of chance because he participated for the first time in 26th Salon de la Jeune Sculpture in the gardens of Champs Elysées in Paris, where he met Annie Viot then they got married in Japan in 1977. "Prophecy" is a cast concrete, H 250 cm he worked in Michel Herzele's atelier in Meudon also at Beaux Arts in Paris direct carving Jean Cardot's atelier.

Shape, space, relation : an environment
HOSPITALITY
But to try and feel Harada's personality, as well as the two hundred tons of granite of Tazawako, one would eventually have to mention all the people that approached him, or followed him in his teaching or in the adventure of the construction of his atelier in Frenay-l'Evêque. They have seen the quality of his welcome, his humble and insatiable curiosity, this other art of relation, hospitality, which is a foundation of his art, much more than a 'simple' practice, which he undoubtedly fully possessed.
Just like environment-sculptures, the spectator is led to participate : if he cannot physically walk through a sculptural space as it is the case in monumental sculptures, he is this time the guest and the actor of an encounter of a more private kind...

=== Sexuality, simplicity ===
Though it speaks to the senses, and sometimes to sensuality in its most carnal dimension, it is above all the primal meaning that Harada's work pursues, a meaning that finds its source in the imaginary of creation, in a literal meaning : union, fold, interweaving, mating, birth. A creation appearing on the edges, the lips, in the intervening space.[Hubert Lempereur]
On earth males and females coexist, their complementarity being an essential condition to life. Sexuality is part of life, there is no provocation on my part. I do things as I feel them and the audience is free to find it shocking or pleasant and natural. Representation of sex in my work has nothing to do with obsession. Sexuality is a universal subject that cannot be made to fit in particular cultural slot. It is neither primitive, nor modern, nor occidental, nor oriental. I just hope people can receive my message simply.

=== Nature ===
- Public commission for the High School Cantau in Anglet-Biarritz, Pays Basque. Carves a monumental landscape sculpture "Atlantic". Many elements placed in a circle : "Sun" diam : 330 x 110, "Waves, Roots, Rocks" : 500 x 170 x 140, "Waves, Roots, Rocks" 500 x 240 x 110, using grey Sidobre granite from the Pyrénées (80 tons of granite reduced to 50 tons of finished sculpture). Works for 18 months in the Bousquet Marbrerie in Bayonne with assistants sculptors Xavier Boggio and Gildas Berthelot. Architects Lefèvre and Fougeroux of Paris. Order from the Ministry of Education.

Tetsuo Harada's major artwork in 1995 : "the Earth Weaving" for the Tazawako dam. An environmental sculpture in granite integrated on the dam. Ordered by the Japanese Ministry of Equipment as the first realization of the Japanese ecological program. Inaugurated on October 19. The artwork is made of four types of red and pink granite. With its waves, roots, links, rocks, sun, it stands in harmony with the dam, the mountain of Tazawako city and Komagatake volcano. Law relief, 120 meters in length, 16 meters high, around 500 polished pieces produced in Madras, India and Brittany, France, transported by boat and truck into the Akita mountain at about 1200 m of altitude. Also free standing landscape sculpture. On the right side of the dam : "Friendship bench", circle 6 m, platform 25m2, in massive black granite. On the left side, a blue granite sculpture "River" H 2,9 m, floor 36 m2. In the entrance "le Tricot du Parc Culturel", H 4m, surface 12 x 12 m, in pink granite.

- Scenography and realization of a land art in 2003 "Les champs de la Beauce" in Louville-la-Chenard, Eure-et-Loir, France, in the plain of Beauce near Chartres. On 5 hectares, use a hundred varieties of plants, in collaboration with two farmers, Hervé Mardelet and Claude Viollette. Eight sculptures decorated the promenades. More than 7.000 visitors. Beginning of plantations in October 2002, harvest in August 2003.
- Realization of the sculpture "Window of the Heart" in the Fudanji Temple, Niitsu, Niigata. Composition of wood and painted metal, H 450, ground 400 x 400, with César Minoru Harada as assistant (Coll. Kobayashi).

=== Intimate production ===
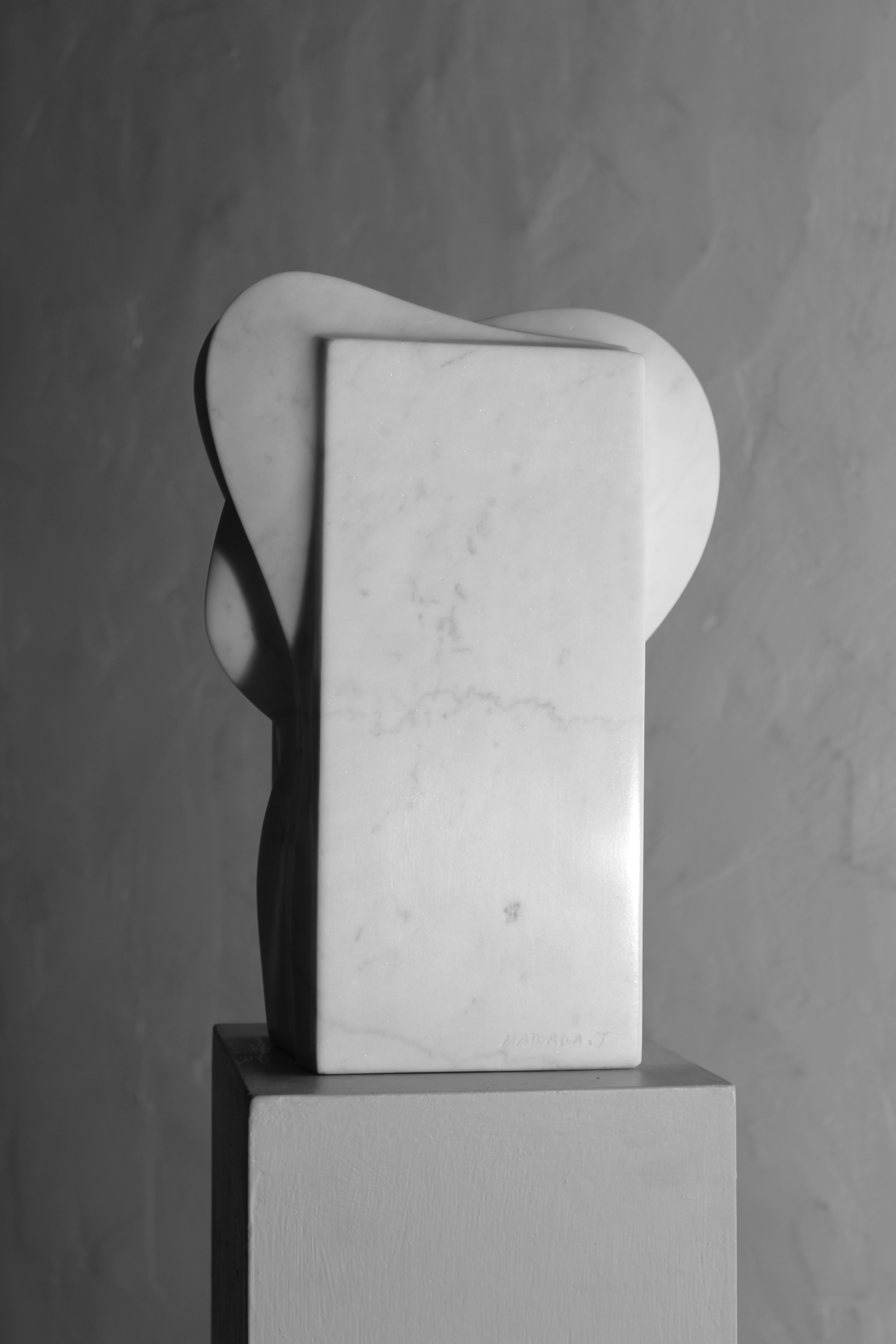
"Friendship", T. Harada 1999, France.

Whether it be through his big environment-sculptures or through smaller pieces, Harada's artwork involves the public and invites it to participate in more intimate encounters. Away from public spaces, in the intimacy of his studio, Harada draws, shapes, curves, models and molds small dimension works. These artworks show unceasing returns, reflexion, dissatisfaction, research, constituting the milestones of an aesthetic intrigue. Sometimes a peaceful moment after a large scale public work, or a class at the university, Harada always needed the intimacy of his studio to prepare large creative public sculptures and installations.

=== Methodology ===
Study drawing, clay modeling, plaster casting, technical drawing, Template, direct carving
