= Detective in the Bar =

2011 film

- Film poster
- Directed by: Hajime Hashimoto
- Screenplay by: Yasushi Sutō; Ryota Kosawa
- Based on: Bar ni Kakatte Kita Denwa by Naomi Azuma
- Produced by: Yasushi Sutō
- Starring: Yo Oizumi; Ryuhei Matsuda
- Cinematography: Kazunari Tanaka
- Edited by: Shin'ya Tadano
- Music by: Yoshihiro Ike
- Distributed by: Toei Company
- Release date: 10 September 2011 (Japan)
- Running time: 125 minutes
- Country: Japan
- Language: Japanese

Detective in the Bar (Japanese: 探偵はBARにいる, Hepburn: Tantei wa Bar Ni Iru; also known as Phone Call to the Bar) is a 2011 Japanese drama film directed by Hajime Hashimoto and based on a novel by Naomi Azuma.

== Cast ==
- Yo Oizumi as the detective
- Ryuhei Matsuda as Takada
- Koyuki as Saori
- Toshiyuki Nishida as Toshio Kirishima
- Tomorowo Taguchi as Matsuo
- Yutaka Matsushige
- Masanobu Takashima
- Renji Ishibashi
- Mayumi Shintani
- Keiko Takeshita

== Sequels ==
- Detective in the Bar 2 (2013)
- The Last Shot in the Bar (2017)
