= Ashita, Mama ga Inai =

- Publicity poster for Ashita, Mama ga Inai
- Genre: Family; Drama
- Written by: Saya Matsuda
- Starring: Mana Ashida, Rio Suzuki, Konomi Watanabe, Hiyori Sakurada
- Theme music composer: Yoshihiro Ike, Kazuyoshi Saito
- Ending theme: Dare ka Watashi o (Kotringo)
- Country of origin: Japan
- Original language: Japanese
- No. of episodes: 9

Production
- Executive producer: Hibiki Ito
- Producers: Shota Fukui, Toshiaki Nanba
- Cinematography: Ryuichi Inomata, Makoto Nakanuma
- Editor: Shinji Nojima
- Running time: 60 minutes

Original release
- Network: NTV
- Release: January 15 – March 12, 2014

Related
- Abandoned (Thailand) Çocukluk (Turkey)

Tomorrow, Mother will not be here (明日、ママがいない, Ashita, Mama ga Inai) is a 2014 television drama that first aired on Nippon Television (NTV) on January 15, 2014. It follows the stories of ten children living in an orphanage. The drama stars child actresses Mana Ashida and Rio Suzuki, who are noted for their roles in the television dramas Mother and Woman respectively.

The series aired for nine episodes and garnered an average viewership rating of 12.85% in the Kanto region. The series was embroiled in a controversy due to its depiction of orphanages, which was criticized by Japanese welfare organisations.

== Plot ==
9-year old Maki Watanabe was left in an orphanage, named Kogamo no Ie (コガモの家, Japanese: Duck's House) after her mother was arrested for involuntarily causing hurt. Here, she meets "Post", a girl who was left at a baby hatch after birth and other children who have been abandoned by their parents or are taken into care due to child abuse or child abandonment. The orphanage is run by 50-year-old retired detective, Tomonori Sasaki, an eccentric housekeeper who runs the orphanage with an iron fist.

Every week, Sasaki holds trials, which are foster parent applications, and he trusts the children to essentially choose their own parents based on their preferences. The children then spend 1–2 days with their selected foster parents, and then decide whether or not they want to be adopted or not.

The children at the home face discrimination from society as well as the psychological trauma of being abandoned at the home. While most of the children harbour the hope of eventually being adopted into a loving family, Maki clings onto the hope that her mother would return one day to claim her from the orphanage.

In the end, some children are adopted, some go back to their birth parents, and some even choose to stay at the orphanage.

== Cast ==
- Mana Ashida as Kirara Sasaki, nicknamed "Post" (ポスト), a tomboyish, headstrong, wise, and perceptive 9-year-old girl and one of the first children at the orphanage. She is the leader out of all the children. Her nickname comes from her being abandoned at a baby post. She also despises her real name due to its girly-sounding nature. Since she was raised by Maou, she is the most similar to him. Despite her tough personality, she has a soft spot when it comes to her friends. (For example, fighting off Piami's bullies, breaking into an apartment to save Pachi, helping Otsubone to leave her abusive home, and staying loyal to Locker when he made a mistake).
- Rio Suzuki as Maki Watanabe, (later Maki Kawashima), nicknamed "Donki" (ドンキ), A naïve, and somewhat spoiled, 9-year-old girl who was abandoned at the orphanage by her mother. Her nickname comes from the Japanese word Donki, (meaning blunt weapon), that her mother used in her assault towards her boyfriend. She rejects her nickname at first, as she does not want to live at the orphanage. However, she later accepts the name when she realizes her mother will not be back anytime soon.
- Hiyori Sakurada as Naomi Toba, nicknamed "Piami" (ピア美), an elegant, girly, and romantic 9-year-old girl. She is talented at the piano, hence her nickname Piami, (a combination of her given name Naomi and the word piano).
- Konomi Watanabe as Yuiko Tōjō, nicknamed "Bombi" (ボンビ), a bubbly, excitable, and childlike 9-year-old girl with a big imagination. Her Dream is to be adopted by Angelina Jolie and Brad Pitt, due to their several international adoptions. Her nickname comes from a combination of the words Bimbō, a Japanese word for poverty, and Disney's Bambi . Her parents died in a natural disaster, but their bodies were never found, hence, she secretly believes her real parents are poor and will come back to get her when they have enough money.
- Shohei Miura as Locker (ロッカー), A good-hearted, quiet, 21-year-old man who was the first ever child at the orphanage. He was never adopted, so he continued to work as a staff member and their chef. At first, he suffered from Selective mutism, but later found his voice. Despite his own trauma, he is one of the most kind-hearted persons at the orphanage. He also seems closest to Post out of all the children.
- Suzuka Ohgo as Otsubone (オツボネ), an emotional, naïve, and somewhat desperate 17-year-old-girl who still has hope of being adopted, despite being the age of majority, and will be forced to move out of the orphanage. She suffers from heterochromia, caused by a piece of broken beer bottle thrown at her by her mother, and wears a patch over her right eye. Her previous nickname was Usa-Tan (a combination of the Japanese word Usagi, meaning rabbit, and the Japanese honorific -tan, which is used to sound cute). Her nickname comes from the Japanese slang word Otsubone, meaning an older woman who has been stuck in the same working position for several years. She often goes to Post for advice on her situation.
- Hiroshi Mikami as Tomonori Sasaki
- Fumino Kimura as Kana Mizusawa
- Yu Shirota as Yuki Tōjō

== Reception ==
Ashita, Mama ga Inai garnered a viewership rating of 14% in the Kanto region for its first episode. However, due to the controversy it was embroiled in, the viewership rating for its second episode fell to 13.5%. Overall, the series garnered an average viewership rating of 12.85% in the Kanto region.

The cast's performance was well received by viewers, with 50.8% of the viewers expressing high satisfaction with the performance of the main cast in the series's first episode in a survey carried out by Oricon.

== Controversy ==
After the first episode of the drama aired on January 15, 2014, there were widespread complaints from foster care associations, orphanages and Japan's only hospital that accepts abandoned children via a baby hatch, Jikei Hospital (慈恵病院). Jikei Hospital criticized the depiction of such abandoned children, and in particular, against the naming of an abandoned child character "Post" because this constitutes "mental abuse" against children who were actually left at a baby hatch. The controversy escalated on January 21, when Japan's national association for orphanages and other related organisations requested that NTV cancel the series. The series was also mentioned during a session of the Japanese legislature, when then-Welfare Minister Norihisa Tamura mentioned that "There were reports about a girl living in a children's home having hurt herself (after watching the drama)".

Due to the controversy, Japanese advertisers such as Mitsubishi Estate and Kao announced that they would withhold their sponsorship of this series. Thus, on January 22, the second episode was aired with none of the usual sponsorship credits. while the third episode was shown with public service announcements in place of commercials.

The controversy was resolved when Nippon Television offered to "give greater consideration to children" by making unspecified changes to the drama's script in a statement made to the nursing home council on February 4, 2014. The next day, the president of the national council for children's homes, Koichi Fujino, acknowledged the broadcaster's statement, and hinted that he will watch the series until its last episode.

== See also ==
- Coin-operated-locker babies
