= Mitsuyo Kakuta =

Japanese author

Mitsuyo Kakuta (角田 光代, Kakuta Mitsuyo, born 8 March 1967) is a Japanese author born in Yokohama. She has been engaged in translating into modern Japanese the 11th-century proto-novel The Tale of Genji by Murasaki Shikibu (紫式部).

== Career ==
Mitsuyo Kakuta made her debut while still a student at Waseda University's Faculty of Literature, with Kōfuku na yūgi (A Blissful Pastime). It won her the Kaien Prize for New Writers in 1990. After producing two well-received novels in 2002, Ekonomikaru paresu (Economical Palace) and Kūchū teien (Hanging Garden), she went on to win the Noma Literary New Face Prize and the Naoki Prize for Woman on the Other Shore in 2004. Hanging Garden was adapted into a film by Toshiaki Toyoda in 2005.

The Eighth Day, translated into English in 2010, received the 2007 Chūō Kōron Literary Prize and has been made into a television drama series and a film. Both her 2012 books – her novel Kami no tsuki and her short-story volume Kanata no ko (The Children Beyond) – were prizewinners. Altogether she has written over 80 works of fiction.

== Current events ==
Mitsuyo Kakuta is married to the fellow writer Takami Itō. She stated in an interview in October 2015 that she is translating the 11th-century classic The Tale of Genji into modern Japanese and this was likely to take her three years. The first two volumes of the adaptation have now been published.

In the same interview she mentioned Shuichi Yoshida, Yōko Ogawa and Kaori Ekuni as contemporary Japanese writers whom she could recommend. She is a member of Red Circle Authors, a curated group of contemporary Japanese authors.
