= Rio Suzuki =

Japanese actress and talent (born 2005)

- 鈴木 梨央
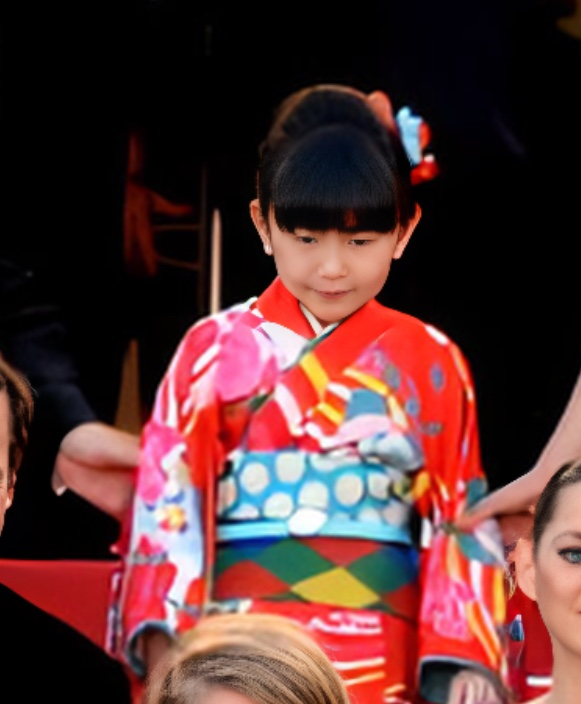
- Suzuki at 2015 Cannes Film Festival.
- Born: February 10, 2005 (age 20); Saitama Prefecture, Japan
- Occupations: Actress; talent
- Years active: 2010–present
- Employer: Jobbykids
- Known for: Ashita, Mama ga Inai
- Height: 160 cm (5 ft 3 in)

Rio Suzuki (鈴木 梨央, Suzuki Rio, born February 10, 2005) is a Japanese actress and talent. She is famous for such TV dramas as Yae no Sakura, Ashita, Mama ga Inai and as a television personality.

== Filmography ==
=== Television ===
- Kaeru no Ōjo-sama (カエルの王女さま) (Fuji TV, 2012) – Minagawa Riko
- Yae's Sakura (NHK, 2013) – Yamamoto Yae (child)
- Woman (NTV, 3 July–11 September 2013) – Aoyagi Nozomi (Koharu's daughter)
- Kosuke Kindaichi vs. Akechi Kogoro (金田一耕助VS明智小五郎) (23 September, Fuji TV) – Masaki Tamao
  - Kindaichi Kosuke vs. Akechi Kogoro Futatabi (金田一耕助VS明智小五郎 ふたたび) (29 September 2014)
- Yorozu Uranai Dokoro Onmyōya e Yōkoso (よろず占い処 陰陽屋へようこそ) (Fuji TV) – Satomi Yumika (episode 1, 8 October 2013)
- Ashita, Mama ga Inai (NTV, 2014) – Maki, nicknamed "Donki"
- White Lab: Keishichō Tokubetsu Kagaku Sōsahan (ホワイト・ラボ〜警視庁特別科学捜査班〜) (TBS) – Hanamura Miyuki (episode 5, 13 May 2014)
- Saikyo no Onna (最強のオンナ) (MBS, 5 October 2014) – Kirihara Mai
- Oanchan, Gacha (お兄ちゃん、ガチャ) (NTV, January – March 2015) – Shizukuishi Miko (starring role)
- 37.5°C no Namida (TBS, July – September 2015) - Asahina Koharu
- Asa ga Kita (NHK, 2015) - Asa (child) and Chiyo (child)
- Never Let Me Go (TBS, 2016) - Hoshina Kyoko (child)
- Zenryoku Shissō (NHK, 2018) - Isoyama Nanami

=== Films ===
- Himawari to Koinu no 7-kakan (2013）
- ST: Aka to Shirō no Sōsa File the Movie (2015) – Dōjima Tsubaki
- Erased (2016) – Hinazuki Kayo
- Miracles of the Namiya General Store (2017) – young Seri
- Kodomo Shokudō (2018) – Michiru Kinoshita
- Brush of the God (2024)

=== Animated films ===
- Modest Heroes (2018) – Kanino
- The Imaginary (2023) – Amanda

=== Anime television ===
- Dororo (2019) – Dororo
- Yu-Gi-Oh! Sevens (2020) - Mimi Atachi
- Yu-Gi-Oh! Go Rush!! (2022) - Manya Atachi

=== Japanese dubbing ===
Live-action

- World War Z (2013) – Lane Rachel (Gerry's older daughter)
- Logan (2017) – Laura / X-23 (Dafne Keen)
- The Worst Witch (2017) – Mildred Hubble
- Home Alone 3 (2019 NTV edition) – Molly Pruitt (Scarlett Johansson)
- Deadpool & Wolverine (2024) – Laura / X-23 (Dafne Keen)

Animation

- The Little Prince (November 2015) – girl
- Moana 2 (2024) – Loto

=== Theatre ===
- The Miracle Worker (2019) – Helen Keller
- Rurouni Kenshin (2022) – Misao Makimachi
- Darwin Young's Origin of Evil (2023) – Rumi Hunter
- Horipro's Peter Pan (2024) – Wendy Darling

== Bibliography ==
- Suzuki Rio no Oshare Arenji Book (鈴木梨央のおしゃれアレンジBOOK) (23 September 2014, Wani Books)

== Discography ==
=== Singles ===
No.	Title	Release date	Charts	Notes
No.	Title	Release date	JPN	Notes
1	"Oya to Ko no 'Hana wa Saku'" (親と子の「花は咲く」)	April 17, 2013	119	Music video on YouTube
