= Nagoya Rainbow Pride =

LGBTQ event in Nagoya, Japan

Nagoya Rainbow Pride 名古屋レインボープライド
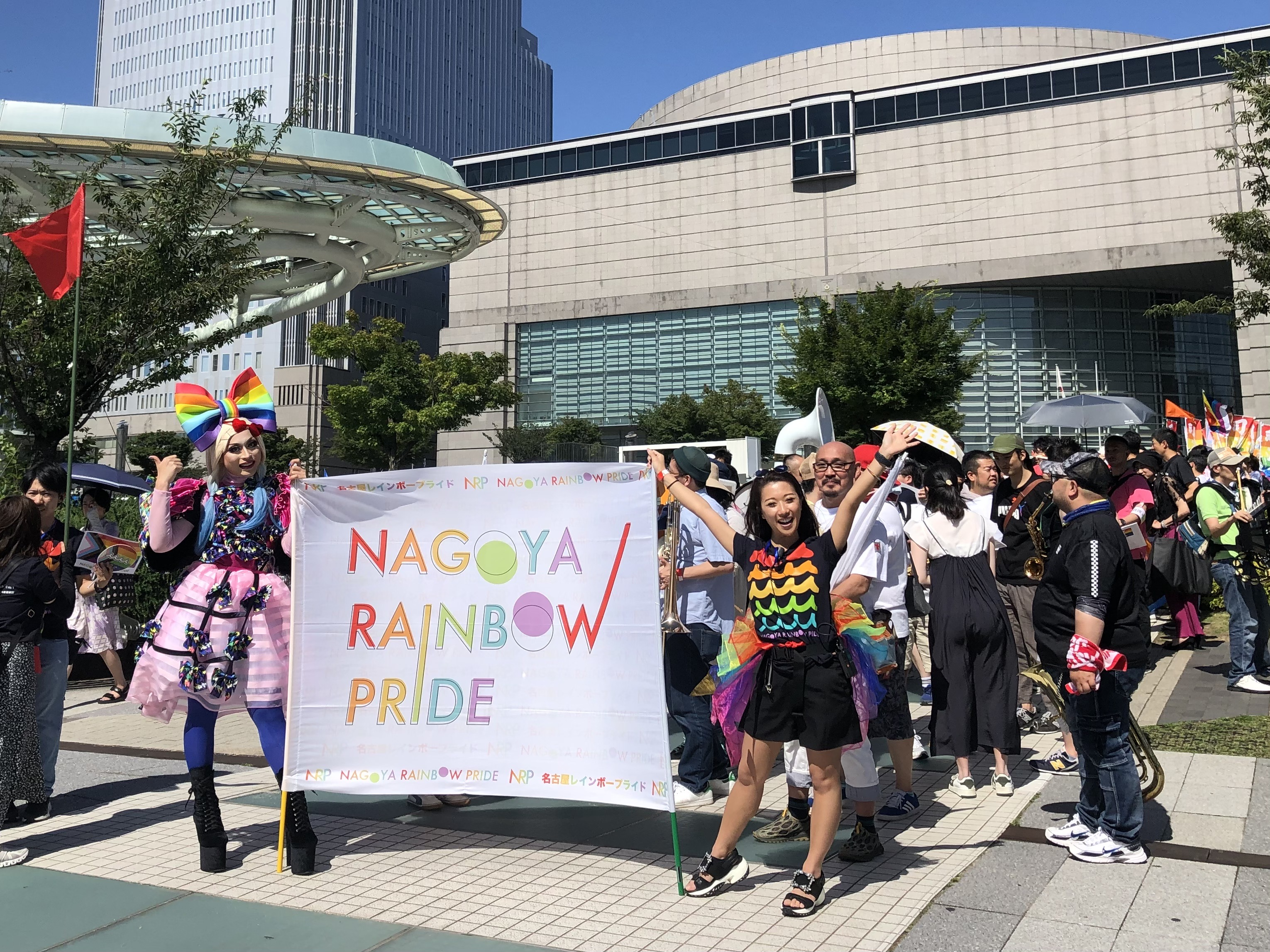
- Parade (2023)
- Date: Every summer
- Locations: Sakae, Nagoya
- Inaugurated: 2019
- Organiser: Nagoya Rainbow Pride
- Website: www.nagoyarainbowpride.com

Nagoya Rainbow Pride is a pride event held every summer in Nagoya City. It began in 2019 as the successor to the "Nijiiro Domanaka Parade," which took place from 2012 to 2017. The event is hosted at Oasis 21 in the Sakae district, and features not only a parade but also various stage performances.

== History ==
Nagoya Rainbow Pride traces its origins to the first "Nijiiro Domanaka Parade," held on October 27, 2012. The "Nijiiro Domanaka Parade" was held annually from 2012 through 2017. Approximately 800 people participated in both the event and the parade during its inaugural year in 2012. Notable participants in the parade included Patrick Linehan, the U.S. Consul General in Osaka-Kobe at the time, and Koyuki Higashi, a former member of the Takarazuka Revue. In 2016, according to the organizers, around 1,000 people joined the stage event and parade. In 2017, approximately 300 people took part in the parade. From 2012 to 2015, the event was held in Ikeda Park, while in 2016 and 2017, it was hosted at Nadya Park. The 2018 edition was cancelled due to increased burden on the organizing committee and challenges related to generational transition.

Nagoya Rainbow Pride officially launched in 2019. In 2020 and 2021, due to the COVID-19 pandemic, the event was either canceled or held online. It returned to an in-person format in 2022 for the first time in three years, drawing about 800 participants. In 2023, the event took place on June 3, attracting approximately 1,200 parade participants.

== Event ==
Nagoya Rainbow Pride features a parade around the Sakae area, while Oasis 21 hosts stage events and exhibition booths. The stage events include performances such as fashion shows and dance.

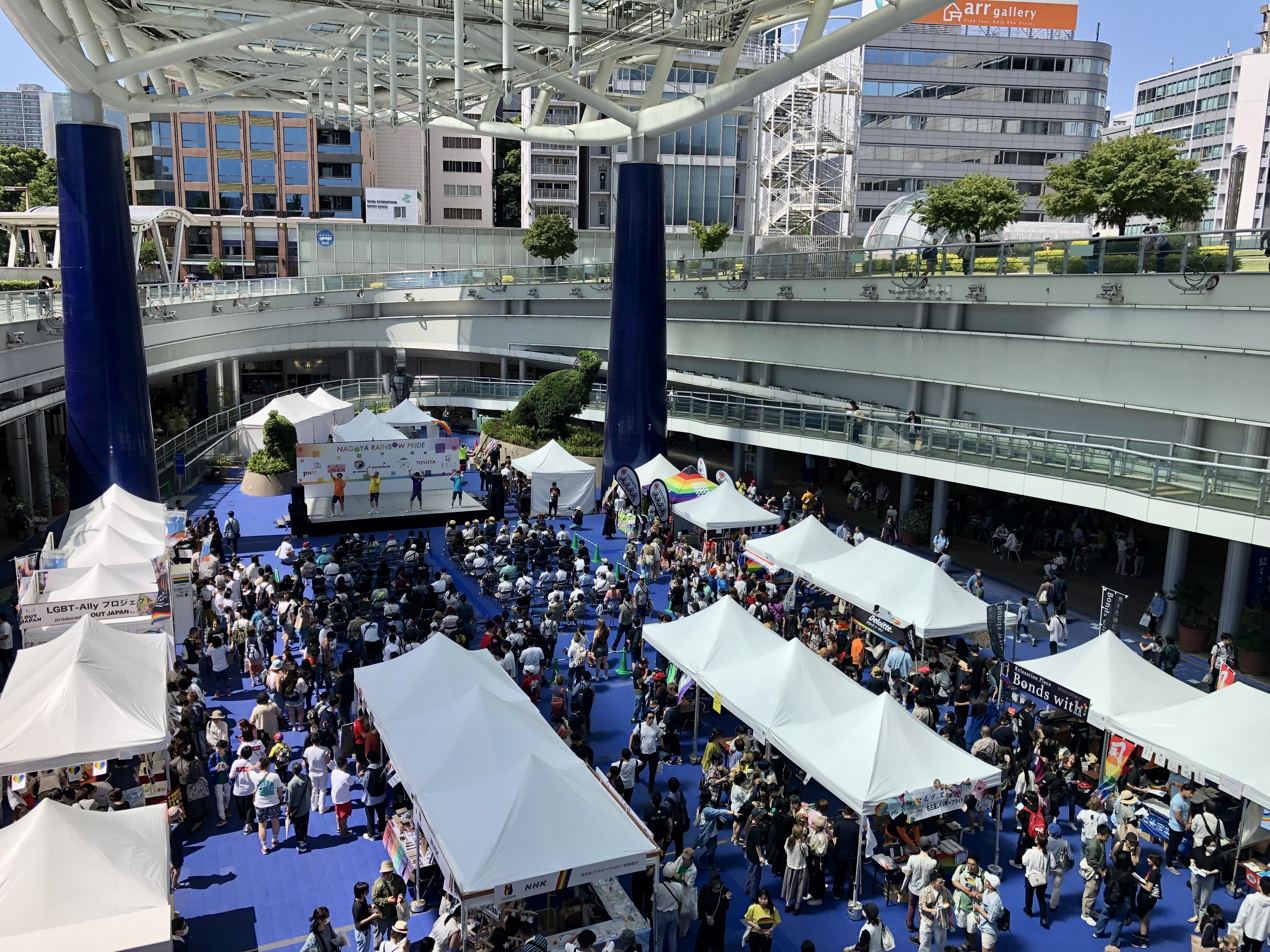
Main venue: "Galaxy Square"

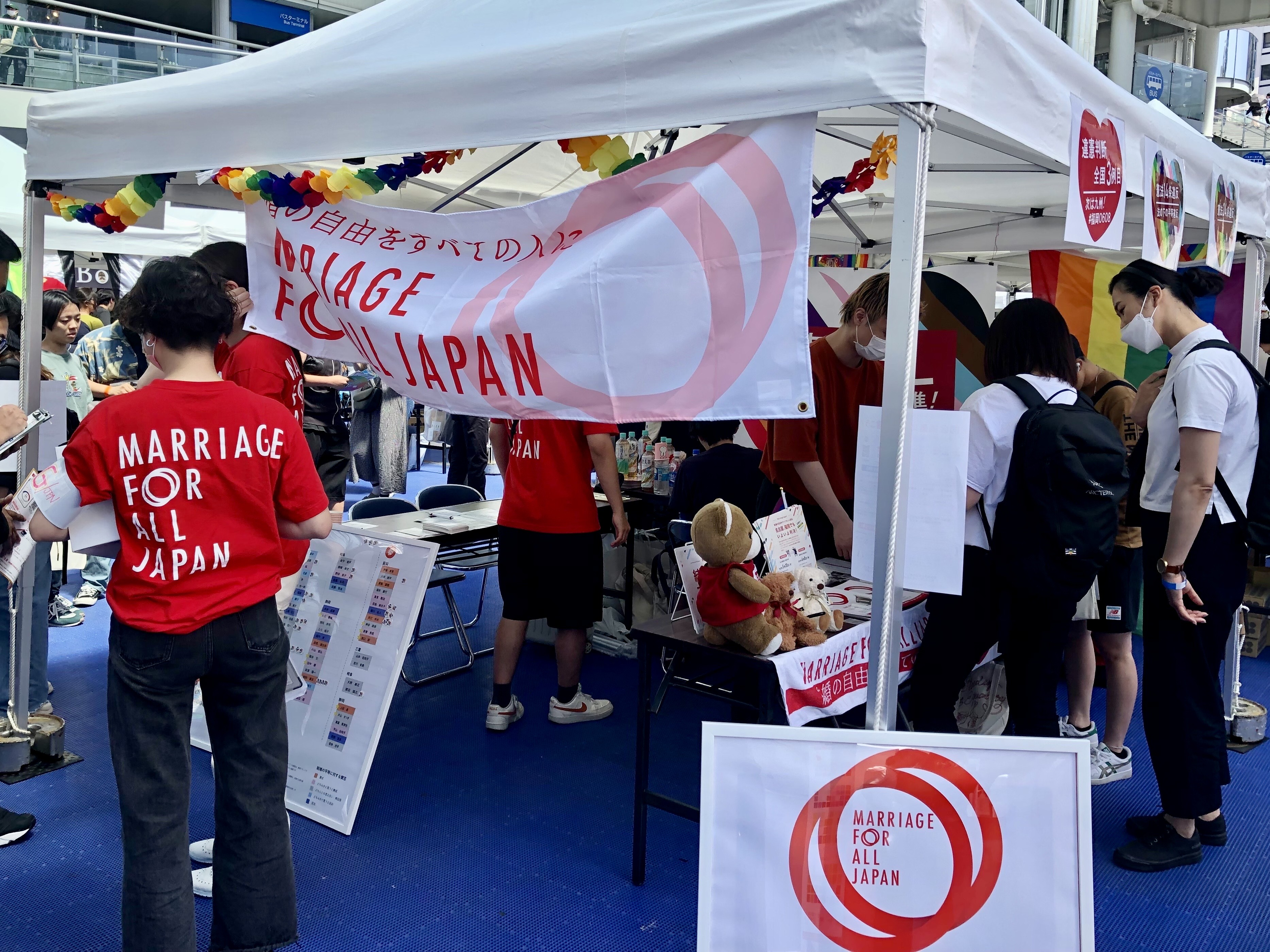
Event booths at the venue

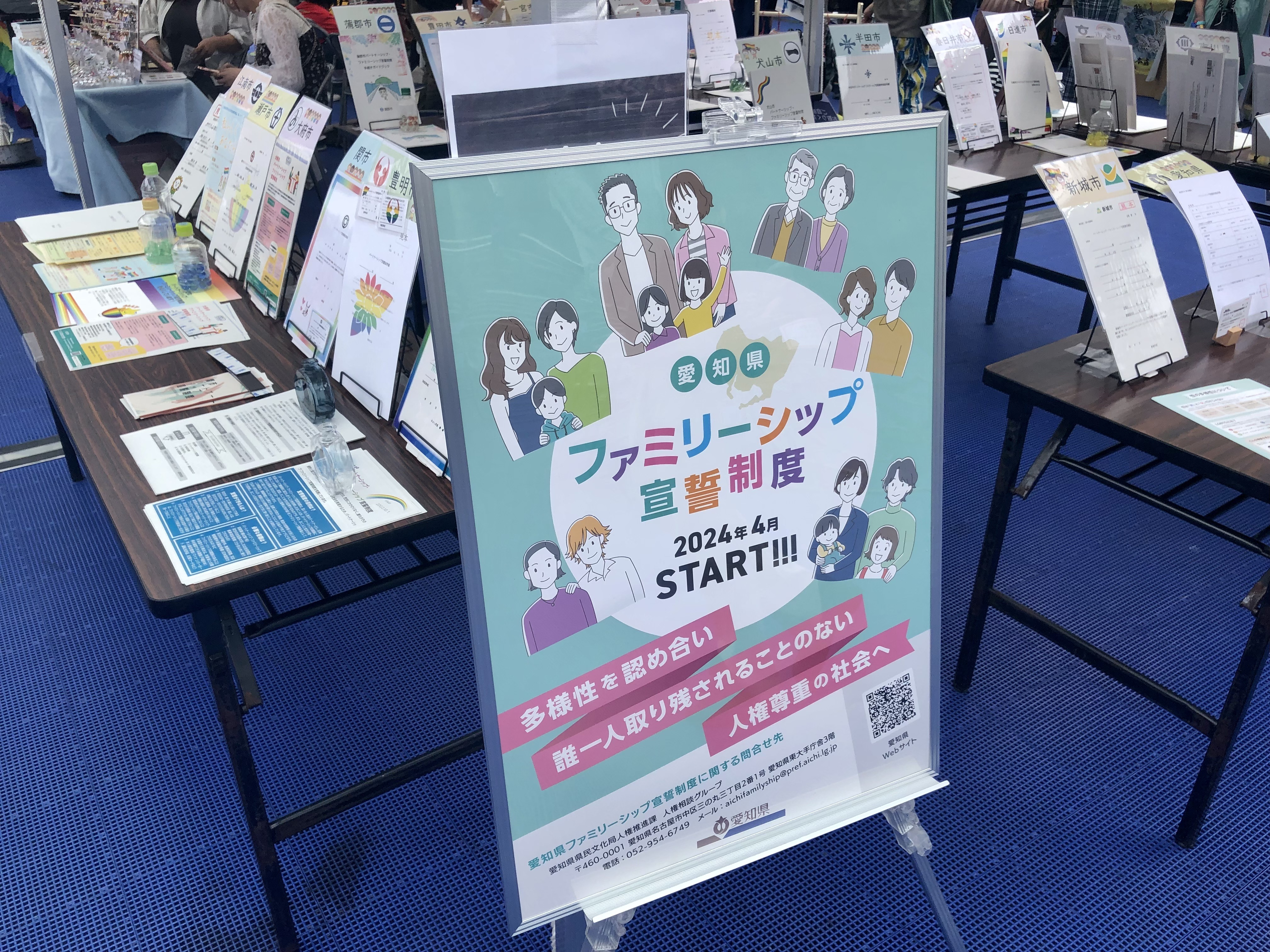
Government booth introducing the partnership and familyship systems of Aichi and Gifu prefectures.

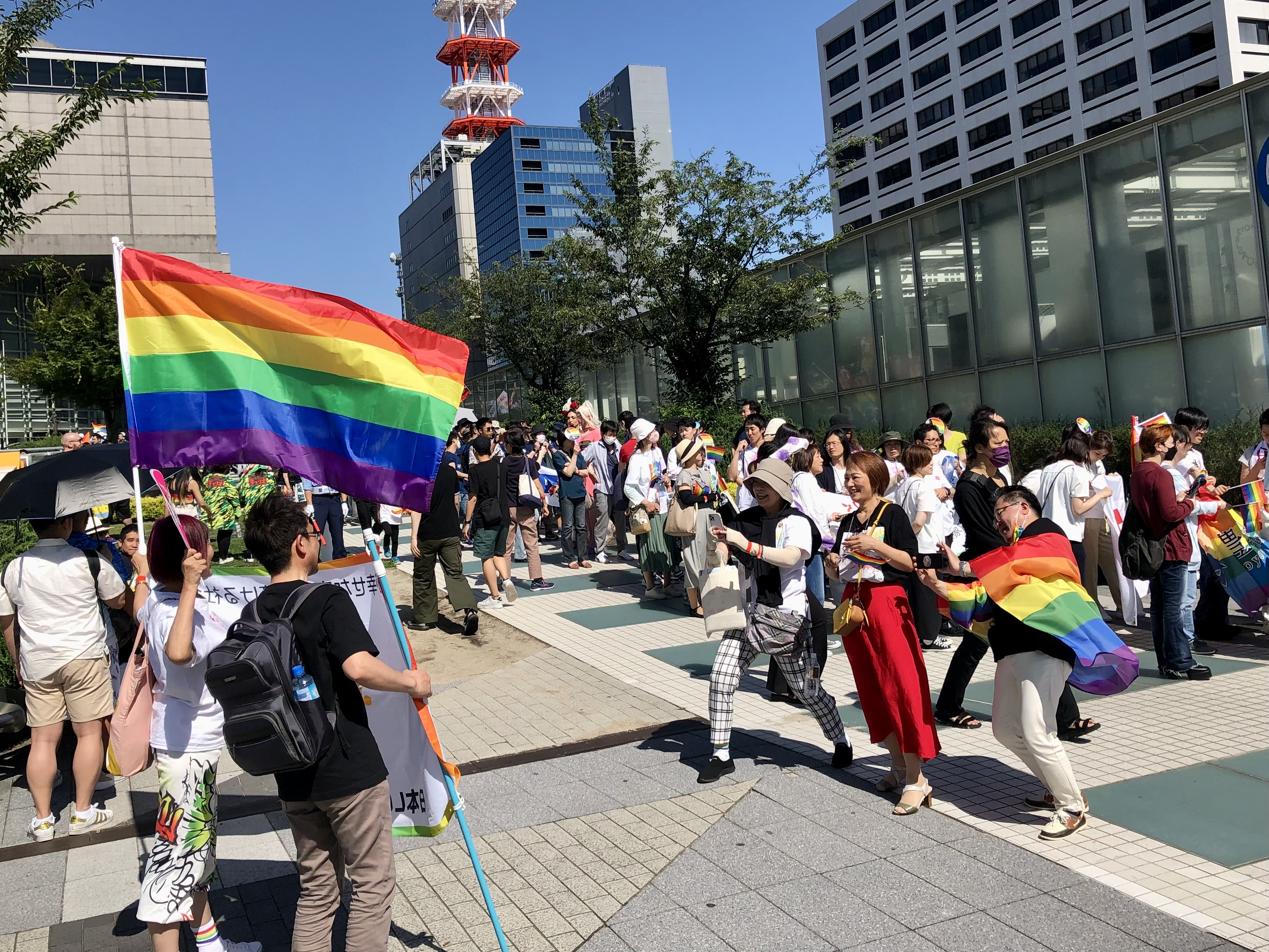
Parade starting point: "Green Earth"

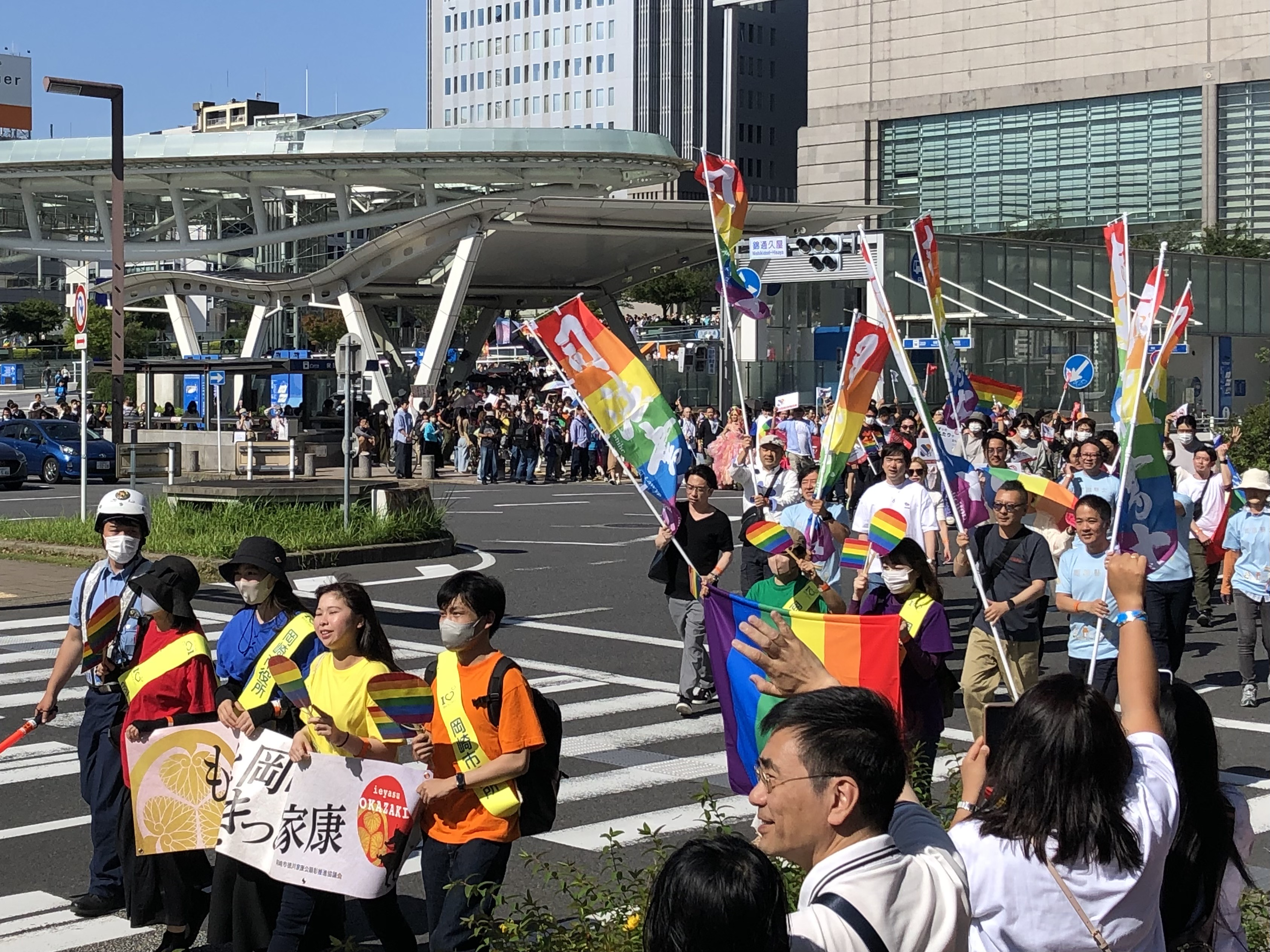
Marching along Nishiki Street

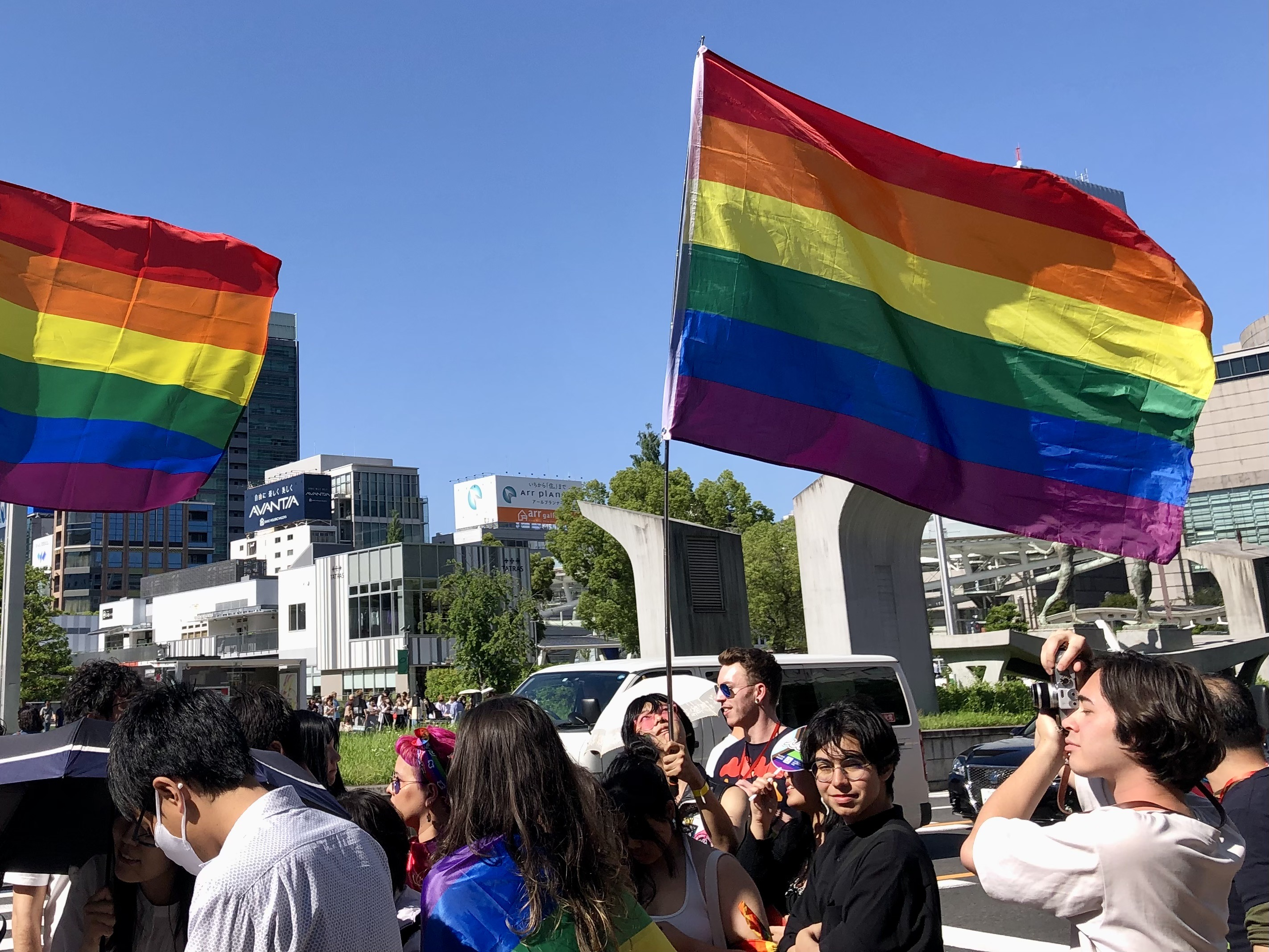
Rainbow flag

== Support ==
Nagoya Rainbow Pride receives support and sponsorship from local governments and companies that have introduced partnership pledge systems both inside and outside Aichi Prefecture. In 2019, the mayor of Toyoake City, Masanori Kofuki, along with city officials, participated in the parade. Additionally, in 2022, Matthew Sensar, the consul general of the US Consulate in Nagoya, took part in the parade. In 2023, the event was supported by 20 local governments and sponsored by 42 companies.
