= Sumika =

Sumika may refer to:

- Sumika (given name), a feminine Japanese given name
- Sumika (band), a Japanese rock band

== People with the surname ==
- Aya Sumika (born 1980), American actress
