= Recognition of same-sex unions in Japan =

Japan does not recognize same-sex marriages or civil unions. Several municipalities and prefectures issue same-sex partnership certificates, which provide some benefits, but do not offer equal legal recognition. Polling suggests that a significant majority of Japanese people support the legalization of same-sex marriage or partnerships, particularly the younger generation. Politically, the Constitutional Democratic Party, the Japanese Communist Party, the Social Democratic Party, Reiwa Shinsengumi, Komeito, and the Japan Innovation Party support legalizing same-sex marriage. However, the Liberal Democratic Party, which has been in power almost continuously since 1958, remains opposed to it.

On 17 March 2021, a district court in Sapporo ruled that the Civil Code provisions outlawing same-sex marriage were unconstitutional, finding that laws or regulations that deprive same-sex couples of the legal benefits of marriage constitute "discriminatory treatment without a rational basis" and as such violate Article 14 of the Constitution of Japan. The court also ruled that Article 24 of the Constitution, which defines marriage as "based only on the mutual consent of both sexes", does not expressly prohibit the recognition of same-sex marriages. Over the following two years, five other district courts issued rulings either upholding the ban or declaring it unconstitutional. In March 2024, the Sapporo High Court issued a verdict stating that the same-sex marriage ban violated the Constitution, the first time an appellate court had reached such a conclusion. The Tokyo High Court ruled similarly in October 2024. While these rulings did not legalize same-sex marriage in Japan, it is anticipated that they may pressure the National Diet to act on legislation opening marriage to same-sex couples. Bills were introduced to the Diet in 2019 and 2023.

== Partnership certification system ==
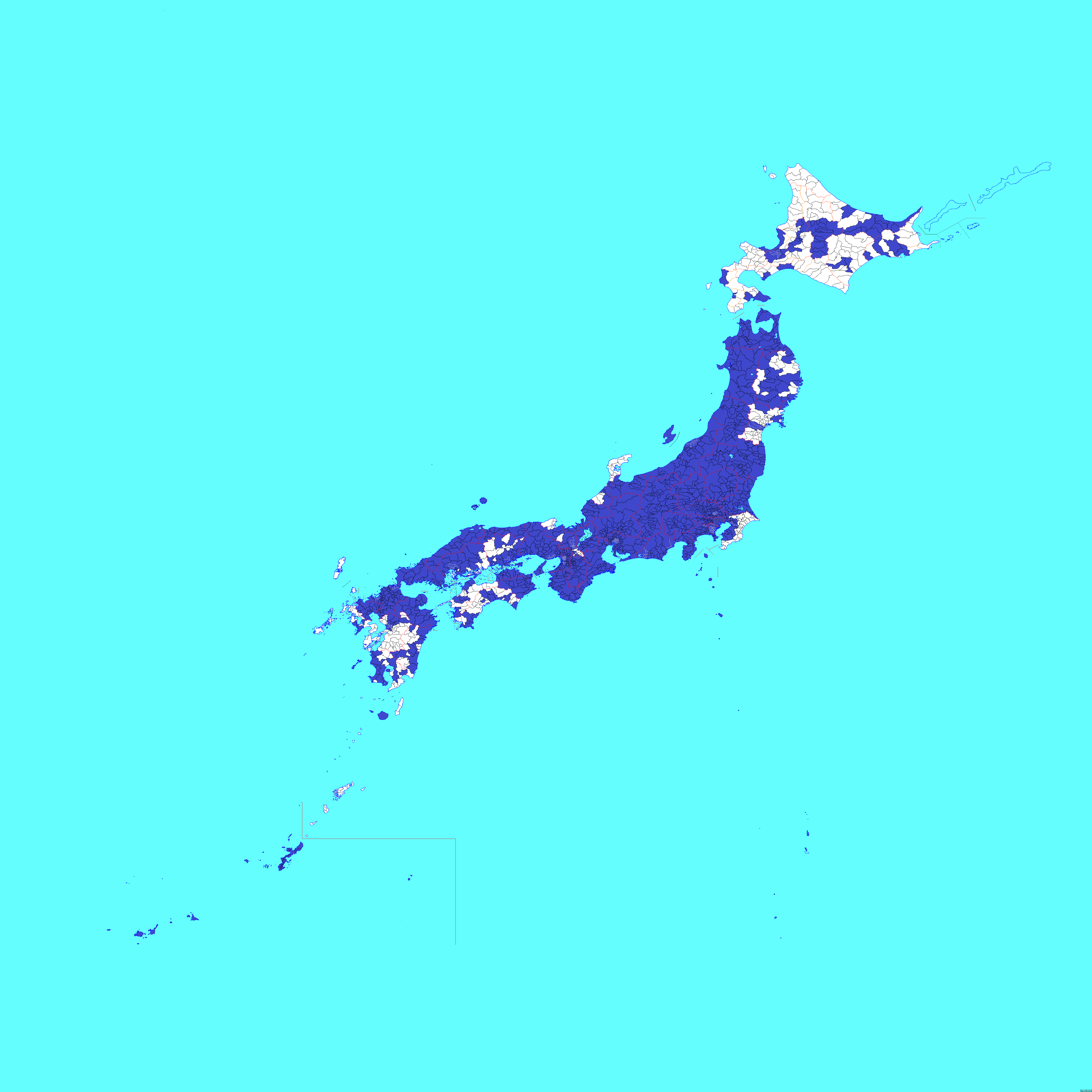
Map of Japanese subdivisions that issue partnership certificates to same-sex couples: Issues partnership certificates to same-sex couples

As of 1 October 2025, 509 municipalities and 31 prefectures have established a "partnership oath system" (Japanese: パートナーシップ宣誓制度, pātonāshippu sensei seido, pronounced [paːtonaːɕiꜜppɯ seɰ̃seː seꜜːdo]), also known as "partnership certification system" (パートナーシップ証明制度, pātonāshippu shōmei seido), which provides same-sex couples with some limited benefits. Couples are issued special certificates which may be useful in matters such as housing, hospital visitation rights and consenting to surgery for a partner. However, the system is not legally binding and there is no legal obligation on landlords or hospitals to honour the couples' rights even if presented with a certificate, though cities have encouraged companies, hospitals and landlords to recognize the certificate. The various benefits provided by the system are also very limited in comparison to those granted to married couples; same-sex couples cannot inherit the estate and property of a deceased partner or attend the funeral of a deceased partner for instance. Partners must meet certain requirements, including living in the municipality or prefecture, being older than 20 years of age, and not having a spouse or another partner. On April 1, 2015, Shibuya in central Tokyo announced it would offer same-sex couples the special certificates, becoming the first jurisdiction in Japan to do so. The Shibuya city office began accepting applications on 28 October 2015. In response to this action by the Shibuya city office, the "Special Committee to Protect Family Ties" (家族の絆を守る特命委員会, kazoku no kizuna wo mamoru tokumei iinkai) of the federal ruling Liberal Democratic Party was formed in March 2015 to discuss the matter. An officer from the Ministry of Justice who was invited to comment stated that the action by Shibuya is legal because the certificate issued is not a marriage certificate and the Japanese legal code does not prohibit the "partnership" of same-sex couples.

The number of jurisdictions establishing partnership systems has increased since 2015. 21 cities established a same-sex partnership registry in 2019, notably Kitakyushu, Nagasaki, Sakai, and Yokohama. 36 cities followed suit in 2020, including Kawasaki, Kyoto, Niigata, Okayama, and Sagamihara, and 69 more cities followed in 2021, notably Adachi, Hiroshima, Kanazawa, and Kōchi. In 2022, 107 cities established a partnership system, including Kagoshima, Nagano, Nagoya, and Shizuoka. Ibaraki Prefecture became the first prefecture to establish a partnership system in January 2019, and 30 more prefectures have since followed suit, including highly populated Tokyo Metropolis and Osaka Prefecture. All these jurisdictions together account for about 93% of the Japanese population.

Several jurisdictions have also established a "partnership familyship system" (パートナーシップ・ファミリーシップ制度, pātonāshippu famirīshippu seido), which also recognises the children and in-laws of same-sex couples. This allows partners to make medical decisions for their children, and to pick them up at schools and kindergartens (whereas previously only the biological parent was allowed to pick up the child). Some registries have also been extended to opposite-sex couples. In May 2024, the city of Ōmura registered a same-sex couple, Keita Matsuura and Yutaro Fujiyama, as partners under the same address. Initially, the city had offered to register Fujiyama as Matsuura's relative, but after discussions, it decided to register him like a husband, a move labelled as "groundbreaking". Despite the registration not being the same as legal marriage, Matsuura said he was "surprised and very happy". "I think it's a groundbreaking decision — a step further than the non-legally-binding partnership system. I hope this will bring more practical benefits to same-sex couples, and will be a step towards legalizing same-sex marriage", he said. On 1 November 2024, Nakano and Setagaya wards in Tokyo announced that—like opposite-sex couples in common-law marriages—same-sex couples would be listed as "unregistered husbands" or "unregistered wives" on their residence registries.

On April 1, 2024, the governments of Osaka, Kyoto and Hyōgo prefectures established the Partnership System Inter-Municipality Collaboration Network (パートナーシップ制度自治体間連携ネットワーク, pātonāshippu seido jichitai-kan renkei nettowāku) as a common mutual agreement through which signatory jurisdictions, including prefectures, cities, towns and villages, may recognize and process each other's partnership registries for purposes of travel or relocation. By October 23, 2024, 17 additional prefectures (Aichi, Akita, Aomori, Fukui, Fukuoka, Gifu, Gunma, Ibaraki, Mie, Nara, Niigata, Ōita, Saga, Shiga, Toyama, Wakayama and Yamagata) and 150 cities, towns and villages had announced their registries' accession to the network agreement.

== Same-sex marriage ==
Laws regarding homosexuality in Asia Same-sex sexual activity legal Marriage performed Marriage recognized Other type of partnership Unregistered cohabitation No recognition of same-sex couples Restricted or ambiguous Restriction on freedom of expression, not enforced Severe restriction of association with arrests or detention Same-sex sexual activity illegal Prison, not enforced Prison Death penalty on books, not enforced Enforced death penalty

=== Background and summary ===
Same-sex marriage (同性結婚, dōsei kekkon, pronounced [doːseː kekkoɴ]) (Note: Okinawan: どーしーぬにーびち, dooshii nu niibichi, pronounced [doːɕiːnuniːbitɕi]) is not recognized in Japan. However, debate on the issue has emerged in recent years, with several political parties expressing support or openness to discuss the matter. Several lawsuits contesting the law barring same-sex marriage were filed in court in February 2019. In addition, polling suggests high levels of support for same-sex marriage among the Japanese public, notably among women and the younger generation.

On March 27, 2009, media outlets reported that Japan would allow its nationals to marry foreign same-sex partners in countries where same-sex marriage is legal. Japan had previously refused to issue a document, which states that a person is single and of legal age and is required for citizens to wed overseas, if the applicant's intended spouse was of the same legal sex. Under the change, the Ministry of Justice instructed local authorities to issue the key certificate to citizens who wish to marry their same-sex partners. Further, in March 2019, the Justice Ministry revoked a deportation order for a gay Taiwanese man who had remained in Japan illegally after overstaying his visa, giving consideration to his longtime same-sex relationship with a Japanese national. The Ministry issued a special residence permit to the man, who had lived in Japan for about 25 years. The Ministry's Immigration Bureau granted him a one-year resident visa after the Tokyo District Court suggested that it review the order.

In June 2011, the deputy head abbot of Kyoto's Shunkō-in temple announced that the temple would perform same-sex marriage ceremonies as part of Pride Month. Similarly, in April 2020, the deputy head abbot of Kawagoe's Saimyouji temple, announced that he would perform same-sex marriage ceremonies. Since 15 May 2012, Tokyo Disney Resort has allowed symbolic same-sex marriage ceremonies in its Cinderella's Castle hotel. Its first same-sex marriage was held on March 3, 2013, between Koyuki Higashi and her partner Hiroko Masuhara.

=== Constitutional wording ===
Article 24 of the Japanese Constitution states: "1) Marriage shall be based only on the mutual consent of both sexes and it shall be maintained through mutual cooperation with the equal rights of husband and wife as a basis. 2) With regard to choice of spouse, property rights, inheritance, choice of domicile, divorce and other matters pertaining to marriage and the family, laws shall be enacted from the standpoint of individual dignity and the essential equality of the sexes." Previously, a couple in Japan could marry only if their respective head of household (the father, or in the absence of a father, the eldest son) consented to the union. As a result, arranged marriage was the dominant form of marriage. Those couples who could not obtain permission had to elope and stay in common-law marriage. The purpose of Article 24 of the Constitution was to assert freedom of consenting adults to marry, and to explicitly establish the equality of both sexes in marriage. Some legal scholars argue that because the intent behind the article was not in reference to same-sex marriage, it need not apply in legalising same-sex marriage. However, conservative lawmakers as well as legal scholars who take a literal approach to constitutional interpretation argue that such an argument is a stretch.

In February 2015, the National Diet debated whether same-sex marriage should be recognized under the Constitution. Kota Matsuda, a member of the House of Councillors, said, "We need to eliminate lifestyle difficulties for same-sex couples. A prerequisite to achieving this goal is dealing with Article 24 of the Constitution." Prime Minister Shinzo Abe expressed his opinion on the issue: "Extending the institution of marriage to same-sex couples was not anticipated under the current Constitution. It is an issue that concerns the very core of family values and, I believe, one that requires extremely careful consideration." In July 2019, the Japan Federation of Bar Associations submitted a paper in support of same-sex marriage to the Minister of Justice, the Prime Minister, the Speaker of the House of Representatives and the President of the House of Councillors. The paper argued that Article 24 did not ban such marriages as "the notion of same-sex marriage was beyond the scope of assumption at the time of [Article 24's] enactment", and that prohibiting it constitutes a breach of human rights, urging the National Diet to legalize same-sex marriage.

=== Political viewpoints ===
The Liberal Democratic Party (LDP), which has been in power almost continuously since 1958, is opposed to same-sex marriage, even though some individual lawmakers from the party have expressed their personal support, including Taro Kono, Ken Saitō and Shigeru Ishiba. In January 2023, Prime Minister Fumio Kishida expressed his opinion on the issue: "We need to be extremely careful in considering the matter as it could affect the structure of family life in Japan". Kishida said in March 2023 that he did not think banning same-sex couples from marrying was "unjust discrimination". In September 2024, while running for prime minister, Ishiba said "he would consider the possibility of developing a law on same-sex marriage". In October, he said that "as far as the government is concerned, it is necessary to closely monitor public opinion, parliamentary debates and lawsuits related to same-sex marriage." On 17 December 2024, Ishiba made the following statement about same-sex marriage during a parliamentary session: "I have met concerned individuals, and I can see that being together is the most precious thing to them. While there is no 'scale' for measuring the national happiness, I believe that fulfilling these deepest wishes would have a positive and beneficial impact on the overall well-being of Japan." In his 2024 book Conservative Politician, Ishiba wrote: "From the perspective of guaranteeing fundamental human rights, as long as there are citizens whose rights are being obstructed, it is necessary to enact legislation as soon as possible, without having to wait for the Supreme Court's decision." However, at a news conference on 25 March 2025, Chief Cabinet Secretary Yoshimasa Hayashi, commenting on the five high court decisions, said, "All of these decisions have not yet been finalized, and we will closely monitor the Supreme Court's decision as well."

Prime Minister Sanae Takaichi, in office since October 2025, opposes same-sex marriage. During LDP presidential election debates in September 2025, Takaichi explicitly stated her position when questioned by high school students. She justified her stance by citing Article 24 of the Japanese Constitution, arguing that because the text stipulates marriage is based on the "consent of both sexes", she is "not in a position to agree with same-sex marriage at this point in time." However, she qualified her statement by noting that she believes "same-sex partners are fine," suggesting tolerance for relationships outside the legal institution of marriage.

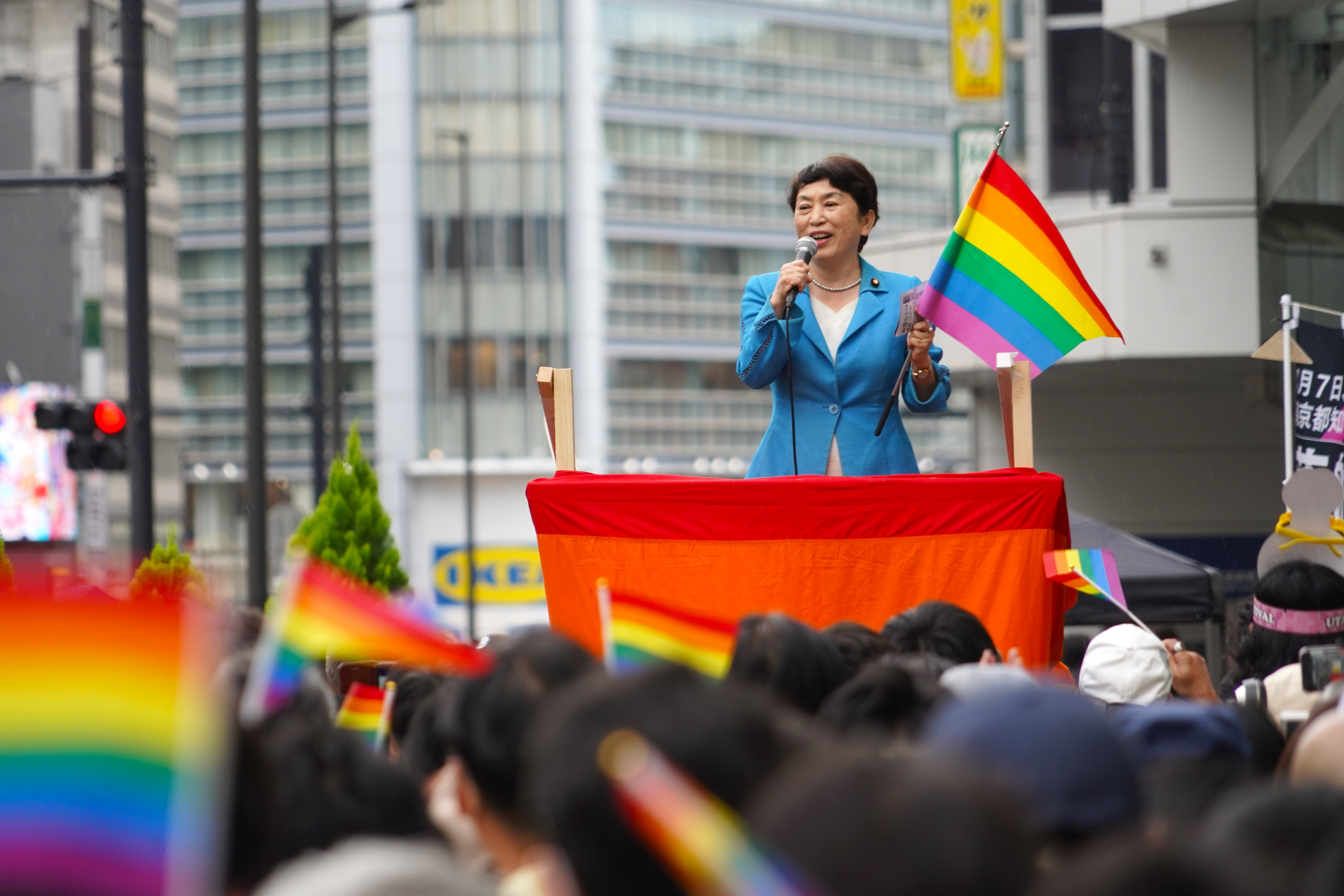
Mizuho Fukushima, head of the Social Democratic Party, calling for the legalization of same-sex marriage in Japan, June 2024

The Constitutional Democratic Party of Japan (CDP), the Japanese Communist Party (JCP), the Social Democratic Party (SDP), Reiwa Shinsengumi, and Komeito support legalising same-sex marriage. The Japan Innovation Party also supports same-sex marriage, but believes a constitutional amendment is necessary to legalize it. Some members of the Democratic Party For the People also support same-sex marriage, including party leader Yuichiro Tamaki. 58% of political candidates running in the 2024 election expressed support for same-sex marriage, while 21% were opposed. The governing LDP lost its parliamentary majority for the first time since 2009, and a slight majority of the newly elected Parliament is reported as being in favour of same-sex marriage (51% support, 25% undecided and 24% opposed). All Reiwa Shinsengumi, Communist and Social Democratic MPs supported same-sex marriage, as well as a majority within the Constitutional Democratic Party (131 MPs in support and 16 undecided), the Democratic Party For the People (16 MPs in support, 10 undecided and 1 opposed), Komeito (22 MPs in support and 2 undecided), and the Japan Innovation Party (24 MPs in support, 5 undecided and 8 opposed). All Sanseitō and Conservative Party MPs opposed same-sex marriage, as well as a plurality within the Liberal Democratic Party (23 MPs in support, 73 undecided and 95 opposed).

=== Legislative activity ===
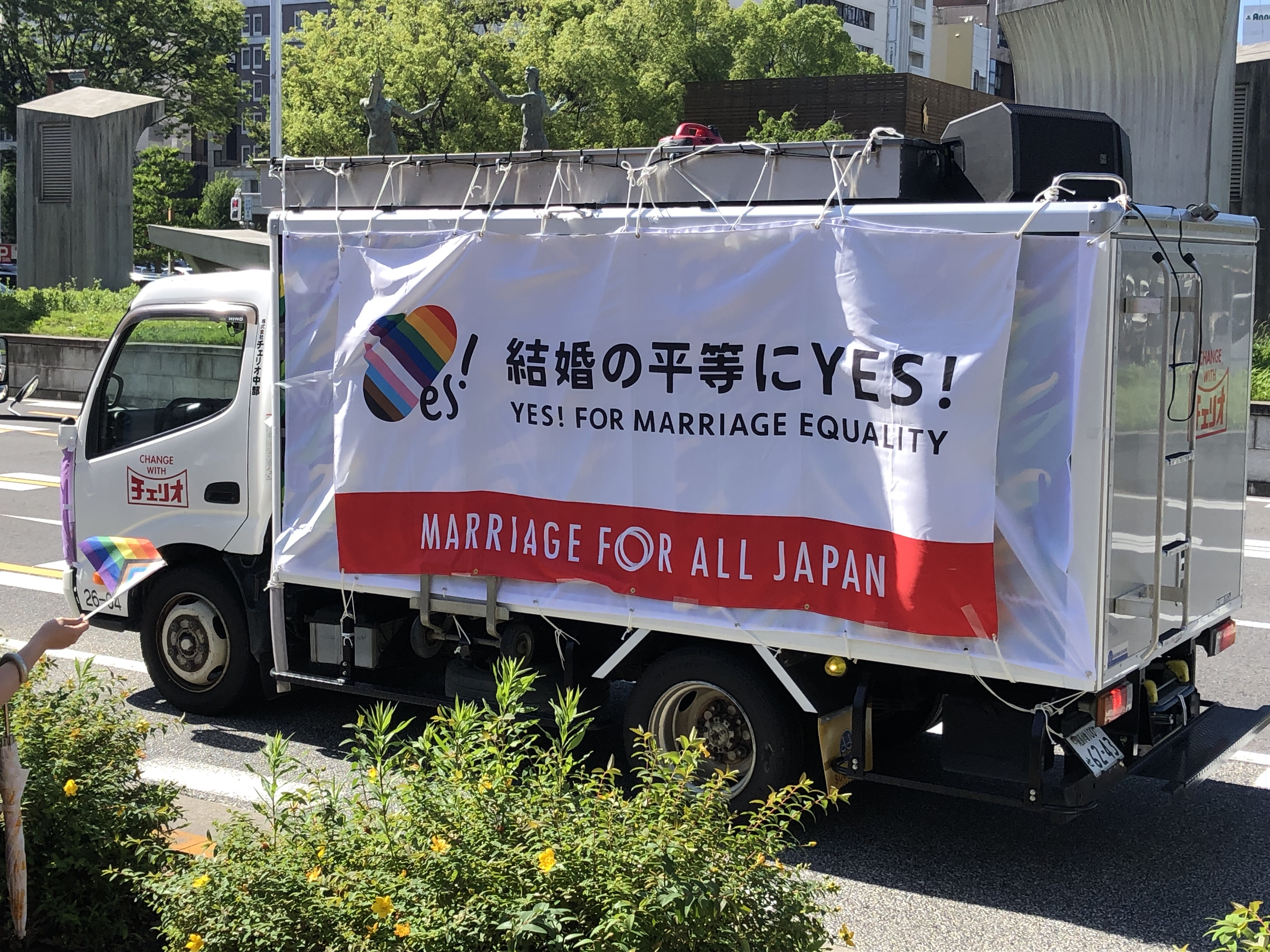
Sign in support of same-sex marriage at Nagoya Rainbow Pride, 2023

In December 2018, the Constitutional Democratic Party announced it would introduce a bill in 2019 to amend the Civil Code to legalise same-sex marriage. The bill was submitted to the National Diet by the CDP, the Communist Party and the Social Democratic Party on 3 June 2019. It sought to adopt gender-neutral language, with the terms "party of marriage" being used rather than "husband and wife", and "parents" rather than "father and mother". In June 2019, the CDP added the legalisation of same-sex marriage and ending discrimination against the LGBT community to their party platform ahead of the 2019 House of Councillors election. The bill did not advance before the 2021 general election. A new same-sex marriage bill was introduced to Parliament by the CDP in March 2023. The Communist Party introduced its own bill on 27 March 2023.

In September 2020, the Nagaokakyō City Assembly adopted a motion urging the National Diet to discuss the legalization of same-sex marriage. Supporters of same-sex marriage hope the introduction of the partnership oath system in numerous municipalities will encourage parliamentarians to legalise same-sex marriage. The LGBT organisation Marriage for All Japan (Japanese: 結婚の自由をすべての人に, kekkon no jiyū o subete no hito ni) has also organised signature gatherings and meetings with lawmakers from across the political spectrum. The organisation noted in particular that the COVID-19 pandemic had made same-sex couples more "vulnerable" and "anxious", as they could not visit each other in hospitals nor entitled to any legal recognition if one of the partners were to die.

=== Court cases ===
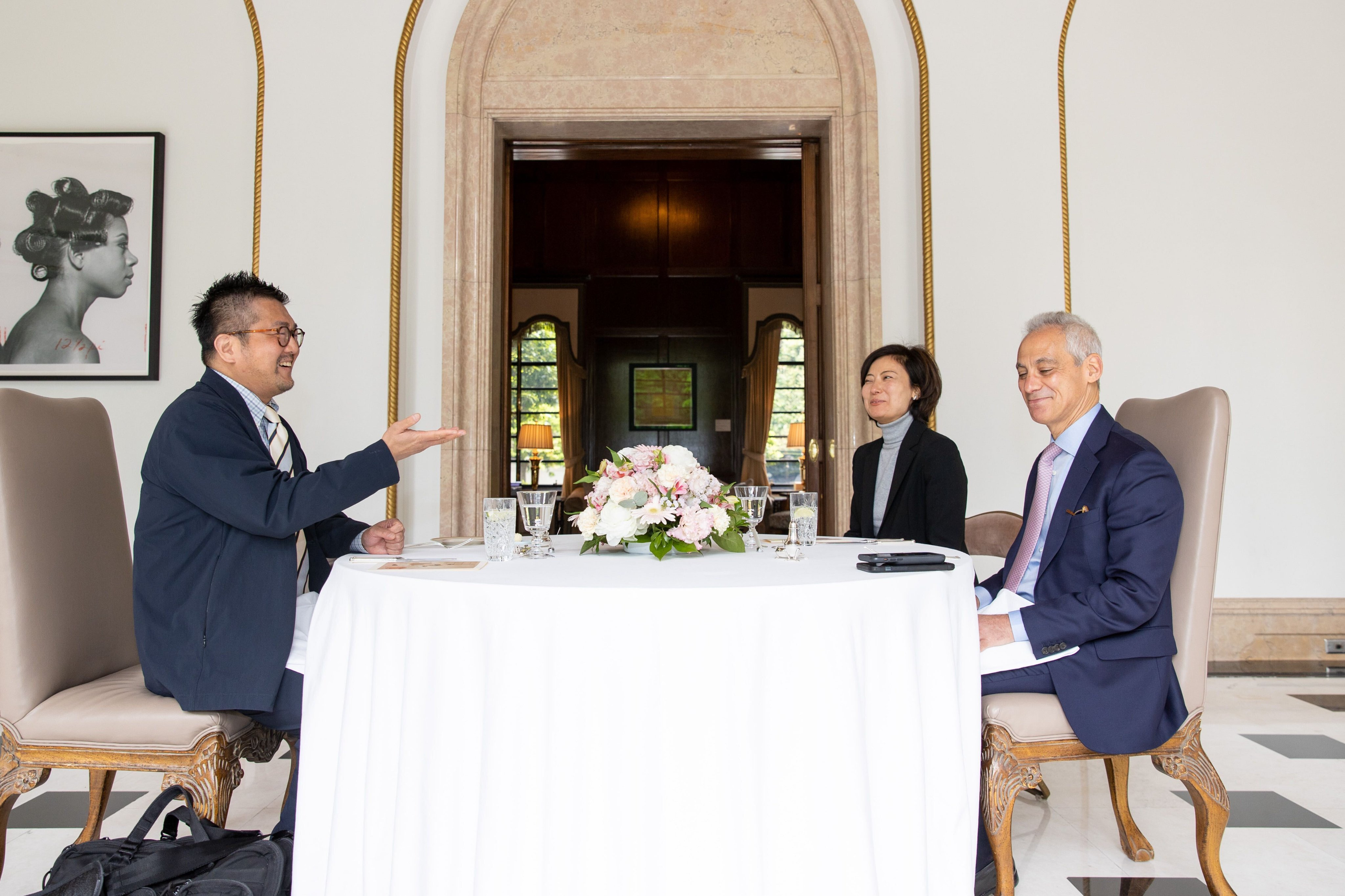
Matsunaka Gon, the director of Marriage for All Japan, meeting U.S. Ambassador Rahm Emanuel to discuss the campaign to legalize same-sex marriage in Japan, April 2023

==== Cohabitation rights ====
On 4 March 2020, the Tokyo High Court ruled that cohabiting same-sex couples should be entitled to the same legal benefits as those granted to cohabiting heterosexual couples. This ruling provided legitimacy to the plaintiff's same-sex relationship, allowing the plaintiff to sue her lesbian partner of seven years for infidelity, a move that was previously restricted to heterosexual partners. The decision was upheld by the Supreme Court of Japan on 18 March 2021.

On 26 March 2024, the Supreme Court ruled that same-sex partners should be entitled to crime victims' benefits as surviving family members. The court overturned the decision of the Nagoya District Court which had denied Yasuhide Uchiyama, a gay man whose partner was murdered in 2014, the victims' benefits in June 2020. Uchiyama applied for victim compensation from the Aichi Prefectural Public Safety Commission in December 2016 after his partner's murder, but was rejected due to the fact that they were both men. He subsequently filed a lawsuit, but his claim was later dismissed by the Nagoya district and high courts. Japanese law on victims' benefits stipulates that those eligible for payments include cohabiting couples, but does not specify whether the couple has to be of the opposite or same sex. The Supreme Court held that the law was "meant to cushion the mental and financial blow for the bereaved family", and that "whether the victim's live-in partner is the opposite or same sex does not make an immediate difference in facilitating that reduction". It remanded the case to the Nagoya High Court to consider whether Uchiyama and his late partner were in a relationship equivalent to a common-law marriage. Subsequently, the Parliamentary League for Considering LGBT Issues petitioned the Cabinet to administratively apply provisions in statute regarding common-law marriages to same-sex couples. In January 2025, Minister of State for Special Missions Junko Mihara announced that 24 national laws regarding common-law marriages would be applied to same-sex couples, including laws regarding protections from domestic violence, lease and rents, and access to child abuse prevention services. On 3 October, 9 further laws regarding common-law marriages were extended to same-sex couples.

On 14 March 2024, the Nagoya Family Court allowed a man to adopt the same family name as his same-sex partner, ruling that the two men "[were] in a relationship similar to marriage".

==== "Freedom to Marry for All" lawsuits ====
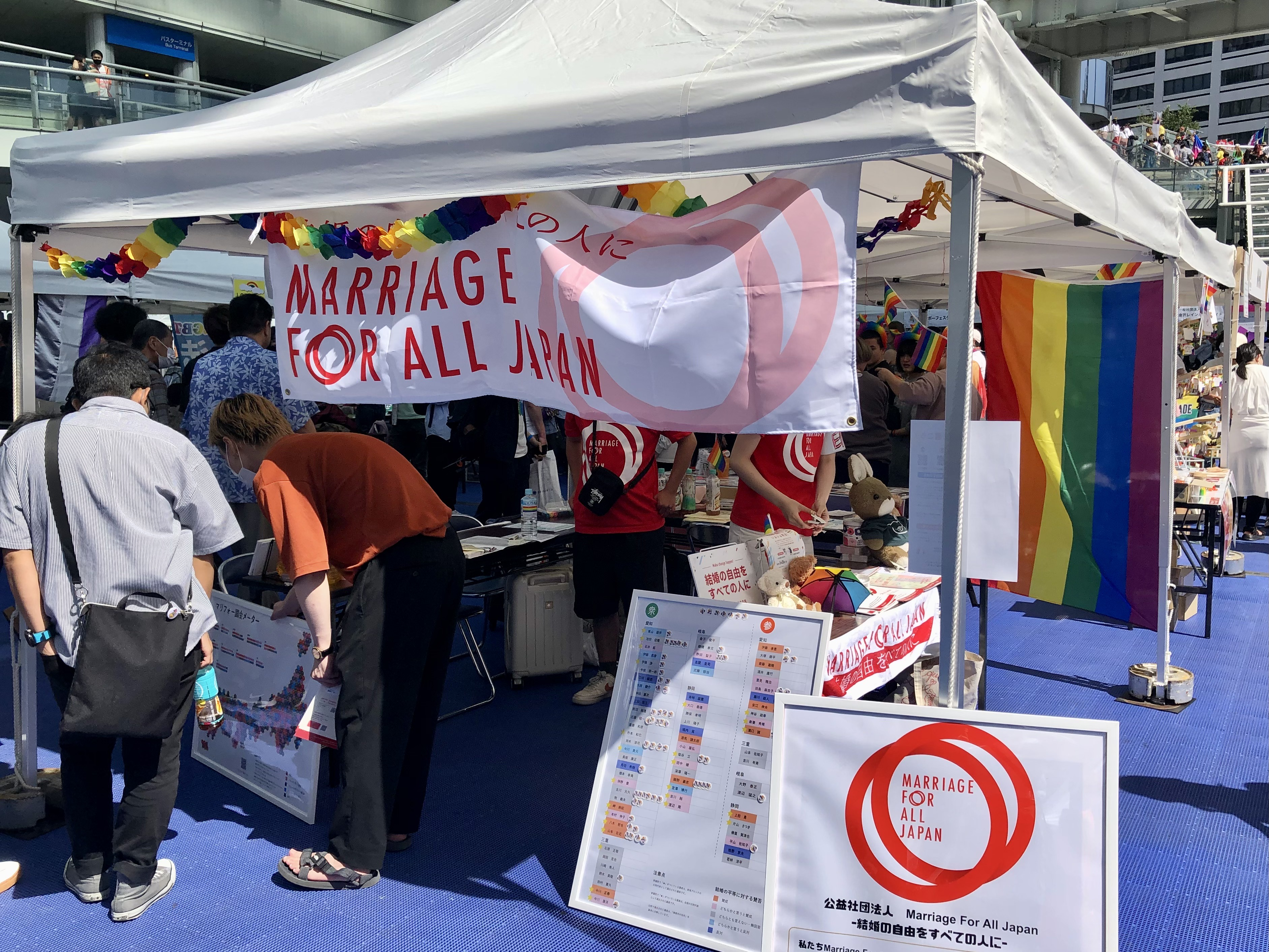
The Marriage For All Japan organization at Nagoya Rainbow Pride, June 2023

===== Background =====
On 14 November 2018, the Mainichi Shimbun reported that several same-sex couples intended to file a lawsuit against the government seeking state compensation, arguing that the inability of same-sex couples to legally marry is unconstitutional. The newspaper reported that this would be the "first lawsuit in the country to directly question the constitutionality of same-sex marriage". On 28 November 2018, the legal team held a symposium with media outlets in Tokyo. Takako Uesugi, one of the lawyers, stated, "Among G7 nations, only Italy and Japan do not recognize same-sex marriage. However, Italy has a national same-sex partnership system. Japan is the only one with nothing at the national level." At the symposium, Sota Kimura, a law professor at Tokyo Metropolitan University, gave a lecture introducing the theory that "the emphasis on 'consent of both sexes' in Article 24, Paragraph 1 of the Constitution is merely a negation of the pre-war family system." In January 2019, about a dozen same-sex couples applied for marriage licenses at different city offices in Japan. On 4 January 2019, a male couple submitted a marriage application at the city hall in Kawagoe. This was followed by submissions from other plaintiff couples across the country throughout the month. All applications were rejected.

On 22 January 2019, the Marriage For All Japan organisation was established by volunteer lawyers, plaintiffs and citizens to "promote understanding of sexual minorities and conduct social education and awareness activities". Makiko Terahara, co-representative of the Tokyo litigation legal team, and Akiyoshi Miwa of the Kansai litigation legal team were appointed as representative directors. Lawyer Takeharu Kato explained, "We are not creating a special system for same-sex marriage. It means making the marriage system, which heterosexual people have access to, available to everyone including homosexual people, and thinking about the marriage system together." Lawsuits, reported in the media as the "Freedom to Marry for All" lawsuits (「結婚の自由をすべての人に」訴訟, kekkon no jiyū o subete no hito ni soshō), were filed by 13 couples on Valentine's Day, 14 February 2019, in district courts in Nagoya, Osaka, Sapporo and Tokyo. The plaintiffs argued that the Civil Code provisions infringe on the freedom of marriage guaranteed by Articles 13 and 24 of the Constitution, and violate rights to equality under the law guaranteed by Article 14. On the same day, lawyers launched "CALL4", a crowdfunding website to support the trial. The name implied "calling for" support, with the hope that citizens could become a "fourth power" countering the legislative, executive, and judicial branches. Over ¥5 million were raised, which funded opinion papers from 10 legal experts submitted to the courts. Fumiko Suda of the Hokkaido legal team later stated, "Without the donations from CALL4, it would have been difficult to obtain a ruling of unconstitutionality."

Another three couples filed suit in Fukuoka on 5 September 2019. The government announced it would prepare briefs opposing the lawsuits. Its brief, published in October 2019, stated that "[marriage] has traditionally been the union of a man and a woman for the purpose of procreation and child-rearing" and that "the state or society legally intervenes in marriage because marriage is socially important as an institution that produces and nurtures the next generation". A second case was filed in Tokyo in March 2021 by eight individuals. In February 2024, a same-sex couple in Sendai announced plans to file a seventh lawsuit challenging the ban. Further, a dual Japanese-French same-sex couple, who had married under French law, filed a petition with the Kobe Family Court in November 2023 requesting the acceptance of their marriage registration in Amagasaki.

===== District court rulings =====
On 17 March 2021, the Sapporo District Court issued a judgment finding that the law banning same-sex marriage violated the constitutional rights of same-sex couples, specifically Article 14 of the Constitution of Japan, which bans discrimination on the basis of "race, creed, sex, social status or family origin". However, the court rejected the request of the six plaintiffs (two male couples and one female couple) for ¥1 million (equivalent to about $9,000 or £6,480) per person for the denial. The court rejected the government's argument that Article 24 of the Constitution (which defines marriage as based on the "mutual consent of both sexes") limits marriage to opposite-sex couples; plaintiffs argued that this article actually only bars forced marriage. The Chief Cabinet Secretary, Katsunobu Katō, said at a press conference later that day that the Ministry of Justice would analyse the court ruling. Chief Judge Tomoko Takebe ruled:

The difference between heterosexuals and homosexuals is merely a difference in sexual orientation, which cannot be selected or changed by a person's will. ... Even acknowledging that the Diet has broad discretion in law-making, the fact that these provisions (specifically, those in the Civil Code and Family Register Act concerning marriage) offer heterosexual individuals the opportunity to utilize the institution of marriage, while denying homosexual individuals any legal means to enjoy even some of the legal benefits arising from marriage, must be seen as exceeding the bounds of that discretion. Therefore, this differential treatment must be understood as discriminatory to the extent that it lacks a rational basis.

Lawyers representing the couples believed the ruling from the Sapporo District Court was likely to have a positive impact on the outcome of the other cases. However, in June 2022, the Osaka District Court upheld the same-sex marriage ban as constitutional. Judge Fumimi Doi ruled that there was a "rationality" in limiting marriage to opposite-sex couples, holding that the purpose of the institution of marriage was to "protect the relationship between a man and a woman who give birth to and raise children" through "natural reproduction". The court stated that Article 24's use of "both sexes" and "husband and wife" referred to opposite-sex marriage based on ordinary interpretation. However, the court noted that recognizing same-sex marriage would not conflict with the Constitution and would align with the ideals of individual dignity. Oral arguments were heard in the Tokyo District Court on several dates in 2019, 2020 and 2021. One of the plaintiff couples, Chizuka Oe and Yoko Ogawa, who had been together since 1994, argued that banning same-sex marriage violates Articles 13 and 14 of the Constitution. During the proceedings, Judge Hiroaki Tanaka described the plaintiffs' individual circumstances as "impurities" and indicated that witness interrogation was unnecessary. In response, plaintiffs organized an online petition, submitting about 18,000 signatures in February 2021. One of the plaintiffs died in January 2021. In April 2021, Tanaka was replaced by Judge Momoko Ikehara, who reversed the previous decision and allowed witness interrogations, which took place in October 2021. In November 2022, the Tokyo District Court ruled that the ban was in a "state of unconstitutionality" under Article 24 and that the government should establish a legal framework recognizing same-sex unions, but did not explicitly declare the ban unconstitutional. Judge Ikehara held that "the absence of a legal system that allows partners to become a family constitutes a serious threat and obstacle to the personal existence of homosexual individuals". The plaintiff couples appealed the decision in December 2022. Judge Tomoyuki Tobizawa ruled similarly in the second Tokyo District Court case and ruled in favor of the plaintiffs on 14 March 2024. He held that same-sex couples have an "irreplaceable right" to live a life in accordance with their gender identity and sexual orientation. However, he held that the establishment of same-sex marriage was a matter for the Diet to address.

On 30 May 2023, the Nagoya District Court declared the same-sex marriage ban unconstitutional under both Articles 14 and 24, but rejected the plaintiffs' request for ¥1 million in compensation. The court held that "the significance of marriage does not lie solely in reproduction and the protection and upbringing of children" and ruled that the non-recognition of same-sex marriage violates both Articles 14 and 24(2) of the Constitution, the first time a district court had found the ban unconstitutional under Article 24. Following the ruling, Komeito MP Yōsuke Takagi expressed a desire to deepen discussions in the National Diet, while LDP MP Kōichi Hagiuda argued that the Constitution "[did] not envision same-sex marriage". Major regional newspapers published editorials calling for immediate legislation, while the conservative Sankei Shimbun and Sekai Nippo criticized the ruling as "unjust and contradictory".

On 8 June 2023, the Fukuoka District Court ruled that the ban was in a "state of unconstitutionality" under Article 24, but "stopped short of fully declaring [it] unconstitutional" and rejected the plaintiffs' request for ¥1 million in damages. The case included a male couple who were added as plaintiffs in 2020, and a couple consisting of a foreign national and a Japanese national who had legally married abroad and were raising a child in Japan. The court ruled that:

The provisions in question, which completely deny same-sex couples the benefits that come with access to the institution of marriage and fail to provide any legal means to become a family with a partner of their choice, are in a state that violates Article 24(2) Constitution, which should be based on respect for individual dignity. However, considering the diversity in system design and the timing of social change, it cannot be said that these provisions exceed the scope of the Diet's discretion. Therefore, the provisions in question are not in violation of Article 24(2).

Overview of the district court decisions
Court	Date of filing	Judgement	Article 13	Article 14.1	Article 24.1	Article 24.2
Sapporo District Court	14 February 2019	17 March 2021	Constitutional	Unconstitutional	Constitutional	Constitutional
Osaka District Court	14 February 2019	20 June 2022	Constitutional	Constitutional	Constitutional	Constitutional
Tokyo District Court (1st)	14 February 2019	30 November 2022	/	Constitutional	Constitutional	Unconstitutional state
Nagoya District Court	14 February 2019	30 May 2023	/	Unconstitutional	Constitutional	Unconstitutional
Fukuoka District Court	5 September 2019	8 June 2023	Constitutional	Constitutional	Constitutional	Unconstitutional state
Tokyo District Court (2nd)	26 March 2021	14 March 2024	/	Constitutional	Constitutional	Unconstitutional state

===== Appellate court rulings =====
On 14 March 2024, the Sapporo High Court ruled on appeal that laws disavowing same-sex marriage were unconstitutional under both Articles 14 and 24 of the Constitution. The court ruled that banning same-sex couples from marrying violates the fundamental right to a family, and called for urgent government action to address the lack of legal recognition of same-sex unions. Unlike the Sapporo District Court, the High Court ruled that the ban also violated Article 24, interpreting Article 24(1)'s phrase "both sexes" as not excluding same-sex marriage but rather intended to abolish the feudal family system. The court noted that "there is no indication that social disadvantages or adverse effects will occur" if same-sex marriage is recognized. Judge Kiyofumi Saito ruled:

Establishing same-sex marriage does not mean demanding uniformity of opinion or evaluation from the public. At its core, it is a matter that concerns individual dignity and respecting each person. Since homosexual individuals face disadvantages in their daily social lives and are confronted with a sense of loss regarding their very existence, it is necessary to urgently take measures to address this. Therefore, as an urgent issue, it seems desirable that sincere and prompt discussions and responses be undertaken, potentially including the application of the same legal framework as heterosexual marriages.

The Tokyo High Court issued a similar ruling in the first Tokyo appeal on 30 October 2024, holding that the ban was unconstitutional under both Articles 14 and 24(2) of the Constitution. Judge Sonoe Taniguchi ruled that "there is no rational basis for maintaining a situation in which sexual orientation, an attribute that cannot be chosen or changed at will, creates a distinction between the enjoyment of important legal benefits" and that the lack of a legal system for same-sex couples is "a discriminatory treatment without rational basis". The Fukuoka High Court ruled similarly on 13 December 2024, adding for the first time that the ban also violates Article 13 of the Constitution, which guarantees the right to the pursuit of happiness. In a widely quoted passage from the ruling, Judge Ken Okada wrote:

Considering that marriage is an important and fundamental aspect of human life and something that ought to be respected, the right to receive legal protection for marriage as part of the pursuit of happiness should be regarded as an essential right for an individual's personal existence, one that qualifies as a concrete right subject to judicial remedy. [...] The provisions in question, insofar as they limit the institution of marriage to heterosexual couples and exclude same-sex couples, infringe upon the right to pursue happiness of those who cannot marry someone of the opposite sex and choose a same-sex partner as their life companion, that is, the right to receive legal protection for the formation and maintenance of a marriage. As such, it must be said that these provisions violate Article 13 of the Constitution.

The Nagoya and Osaka high courts also ruled the ban unconstitutional in March 2025. However, the Tokyo High Court upheld the ban as constitutional in the second Tokyo case on 28 November 2025, becoming the first high court to do so.

Overview of the high court decisions
Court	Date of appeal	Judgement	Article 13	Article 14.1	Article 24.1	Article 24.2
Sapporo High Court	31 March 2021	14 March 2024	Constitutional	Unconstitutional	Unconstitutional	Unconstitutional
Tokyo High Court (1st)	13 December 2022	30 October 2024	Constitutional	Unconstitutional	Constitutional	Unconstitutional
Fukuoka High Court	19 June 2023	13 December 2024	Unconstitutional	Unconstitutional	Constitutional	Unconstitutional
Nagoya High Court	12 June 2023	7 March 2025	Constitutional	Unconstitutional	Constitutional	Unconstitutional
Osaka High Court	30 June 2022	25 March 2025	Constitutional	Unconstitutional	Constitutional	Unconstitutional
Tokyo High Court (2nd)	27 March 2024	28 November 2025	Constitutional	Constitutional	Constitutional	Constitutional

===== Supreme Court ruling =====
On 25 March 2024, the plaintiffs in the Sapporo lawsuit filed an appeal of the High Court decision based on the fact that the court had dismissed their claim for compensation and that discussions on the legalization of same-sex marriage were not progressing in the Diet. This was the first appeal to the Supreme Court in the series of lawsuits, followed by plaintiffs in the other five cases. On 25 March 2026, the Supreme Court accepted all six appeals and referred them to the Grand Bench.

=== Transgender and intersex issues ===
On 16 July 2024, a transgender person, whose sex was registered as male but who was married to a woman, filed a petition with the Kyoto Family Court. The petitioner sought to change their registered gender from male to female, arguing that the provision in the Act on Special Cases in Handling Gender Status for Persons with Gender Identity Disorder requiring applicants to be unmarried was unconstitutional. The provision exists to prevent the creation of same-sex marriages in the family register, but the applicant argued that denying same-sex marriage was itself unconstitutional and that forcing a divorce to change gender was a human rights violation. The Kyoto Family Court ruled the provision constitutional on 19 March 2025, a decision upheld by the Osaka High Court on 25 September 2025. The applicant has appealed to the Supreme Court.

=== Koseki registry ===
In Japan, each citizen is registered through the koseki system whereby an individual is registered as a part of a household (while in the Western world, a birth certificate can act as a proof of identity). Koseki registration performs a somewhat similar role to marriage in the West as it endows a member of the same koseki legal power (as next of kin) in dealing with civil matters such as inheritance, hospital visits or the right to organise a funeral. Therefore, registering each other as a part of the koseki works as a substitute for Western-style marriage. As a consequence, Japanese same-sex couples, in the absence of same-sex marriage or civil partnership laws, often use adoption procedures to register themselves as belonging to the same household; where the older partner legally adopts the younger partner, which in absence of a spouse makes the only adopted child the sole executor of that household.

== Historical and customary recognition ==
While there are no records of same-sex marriages as understood from a Western perspective being performed in pre-modern Japanese culture, there is evidence for identities and behaviours that may be placed on the LGBT spectrum. During the Edo period, some forms of same-sex relations were recognized. For instance, within Buddhist monasteries, age-structured relationships known as nanshoku (男色) existed, where an older partner (念者, nenja), usually a monk or an abbot, would take a younger man (稚児, chigo) as his partner. The relationship, which involved sexual relations, would be dissolved once the boy reached adulthood (or left the monastery). Both parties were encouraged to treat the relationship seriously and conduct the affair honorably, and the nenja might be required to write a formal vow of fidelity. Among the samurai class, there were similar age-structured relationships, known as wakashūdō (若衆道). The older partner was permitted, if the younger partner agreed, to take him as his lover until he came of age; this relationship, often formalized in a "brotherhood contract", was expected to be exclusive, with both partners swearing to take no other male lovers. Both parties were expected to be loyal unto death, and to assist the other both in feudal duties and in honor-driven obligations such as duels and vendettas. Although sexual relations were expected to end when the younger partner came of age, the relationship would, ideally, develop into a lifelong bond of friendship. At the same time, sexual activity with women was not barred (for either party), and once the boy came of age, both were free to seek other wakashū lovers.

It is believed that the Ainu people traditionally recognized people who fulfilled a cultural third gender role. These people may have been shamans. Ainu folklore and oral history also recount stories of married men taking male concubines as sexual partners. Marriage (ウホクコレ, uhokukore) in Ainu society generally involved first cousins, and polygamy was also permitted.

== Public opinion ==
Support for same-sex marriage among 18–21-year-olds according to a 2016 survey from the Varkey Foundation

A May 2013 Ipsos poll found that out of over a thousand Japanese adult interviewees 24% were in favor of same-sex marriage and another 27% supported other forms of recognition for same-sex couples. An April 2014 Ipsos poll found that 26% of respondents were in favor of same-sex marriage and 24% were in favor of some other form of recognition, such as civil unions. A May 2015 Ipsos poll found that 30% of respondents were in favour of same-sex marriage and a further 28% were in favour of some other form of recognition (meaning that 58% supported recognising same-sex couples in some form).

According to a survey by Nihon Yoron Chōsa-kai conducted on 1 and 2 March 2014, 42% of Japanese people supported same-sex marriage, while 52% opposed it. Another poll conducted by Fuji News Network in April 2015 showed that 59% of respondents supported the same-sex partnership certificate system proposed in Shibuya and 53% supported same-sex marriage, the first time a poll had found majority support for same-sex marriage in Japan. An additional poll conducted by the National Institute of Population and Social Security Research in November 2015 showed a 51% majority in support of same-sex marriage, unions or partnerships, while 41% were opposed. People under the age of 20 were overwhelmingly in favor of same-sex marriage (72% support), whereas people aged 70 and over overwhelmingly opposed (24% support). However, a September–October 2016 survey by the Varkey Foundation found that 53% of 18–21-year-olds supported same-sex marriage in Japan. A 2017 opinion poll released by the NHK showed that 51% of Japanese people supported same-sex marriage.

According to an opinion poll carried out by Dentsu in October 2018, 78% of Japanese people in their 20s to 50s were in favour of same-sex marriage. Support was higher among women (88%) than men (69%), and was higher among younger respondents: 87% for people in their 20s, 81% for people in their 30s, 77.5% for people in their 40s, and 72.5% for people in their 50s. The National Survey of Household Trends, a government survey carried out in 2018 and commissioned by the National Institute of Population and Social Security Research, showed that 72% of Japanese married women supported same-sex marriage. Levels of support were different between age groups: 92% for married women under the age of 30, 89.5% for those between the ages of 30 and 39, 83% for those between the ages of 40 and 49, 73.5% for those between 50 and 59, 59% for those between 60 and 69, and 42% for those aged 70 and higher.

A 2019 opinion survey conducted by the Hiroshima Shudo University and published in November 2020 showed that 65% of Japanese people supported same-sex marriage, while 30% were opposed. Attitudes varied greatly with age, with 81% of 20–30-year-olds supporting, followed by 74% of people in their 40s and 50s, and 47% of people in their 60s and 70s.

A joint survey by the University of Tokyo and The Asahi Shimbun, conducted between March and April 2020, showed that 46% of Japanese people favored same-sex marriage, 31% were neutral and 23% were opposed. Among supporters of the Liberal Democratic Party (LDP), support stood at 41% and opposition at 29%. This contrasted significantly with the opinions of LDP lawmakers, as a 2019 survey conducted shortly before the House of Councillors election showed that only 9% of LDP candidates supported same-sex marriage. Professor Masaki Taniguchi, who headed the survey, said it was rare to witness public opinion on a certain issue change so rapidly, noting that support had increased 14% from 2017. A March 2021 poll from The Asahi Shimbun found that 65% of Japanese people supported same-sex marriage, with support rising to 86% among 18–29-year-olds. A February 2023 Kyodo News poll showed that 64% of Japanese people supported same-sex marriage, while 25% were opposed. A poll conducted the same month by The Asahi Shimbun found that 72% of Japanese people supported same-sex marriage and 18% were opposed.

A March–April 2023 Kyodo News survey showed that 71% of Japanese people supported same-sex marriage, while 26% were opposed. Support was highest among respondents below the age of 30, at 85%. 62% of LDP voters also supported same-sex marriage. A Pew Research Center poll conducted between June and September 2023 showed that 68% of Japanese people supported same-sex marriage, 26% were opposed and 8% did not know or had refused to answer. When divided by age, support was highest among 18–34-year-olds at 84% and lowest among those aged 35 and above at 64%. Women (73%) were also more likely to support same-sex marriage than men (61%). Support was highest among the religiously unaffiliated at 73%, and lowest among Buddhists at 66%.

== See also ==
- Homosexuality in Japan
- Marriage in Japan
- Partnership oath in Japan
- LGBTQ rights in Japan
  - LGBTQ rights in Tokyo
- Recognition of same-sex unions in Asia
- Same-sex union court cases
