= Koyuki Higashi =

Japanese actress (born 1985)

- 東 小雪
- Born: 1 February 1985 (age 41); Kanazawa, Ishikawa Prefecture
- Other name: Aura Maki (former stage name)
- Occupations: LGBT activist; stage actress; writer

Koyuki Higashi (東 小雪, Higashi Koyuki; born 1 February 1985) is a Japanese LGBT (Note: The initials of LGBT stands for lesbian, gay, transgender, bisexual. For the details, refer to the relevant articles.) activist, stage actress and writer. From 2005 to 2006, she was an otokoyaku member of the Takarazuka Revue Hana-gumi under the name Aura Maki (あうら真輝). In the fall of 2010, she became involved in LGBT issues.

== Early life ==
Higashi was born in Kanazawa, Ishikawa Prefecture. After enrolling in Hokuriku Gakuin Junior and Senior High School she entered Takarazuka Music College. In 2005, she became the 91st generation student of the Takarazuka Revue Company. Later in the year, Higashi debuted in the Hanagumi stage Marrakech Kurenai no Bohyō / Enter the Review. Later on she, with seven other members including Sumika Nono, joined Hanagumi, she later left Takarazuka in 2006, and stopped her entertainment activities.

In the autumn of 2010, Higashi started supporting LGBT activities with her real name. She established that she was a lesbian and later announced to the Takarazuka Revue Company as Aura Maki at the same time. In December 2011, Higashi launched "Rainbow Kanazawa", and became a representative until April 2013. In March 2011, she became a staff member of the teenager events "Onna no Ko" ga Sukina "Onna no Ko" no tame no Tomodachi-zukuri Event and Peer Friends for girls until July 2014. In January 2014, Higashi wrote the manga Lesbian-teki Kekkon Seikatsu (co-written with her wife Hiroko Masuhara, and illustrated by Emiko Sugiyama), later in June she wrote Nakatta koto ni shitakunai – Jippu kara Sei Gyakutai o Uketa Watashi no Kokuhaku ("I do not want to make it not – I confessed my sexual abuse from my father") by herself, in which she started writing in earnest. Currently, she appeared in LGBT and sexual abuse-related television programmes and lectures apart from writing. In addition, she presented in Makimū & Koyutan no Lesbian Channel in Niconico's live broadcast with lesbian tarento Asako Makimura, Higashi also presented Koyutan no Suiyōbi in which it broadcasts on the theme of LGBT enlightenment and events related to the LGBT community.

== Her same-sex wedding at Tokyo Disney Resort ==
In March 2012, Tokyo Disney Resort announced the plan "Disney Royal Dream Wedding" (Note: It is the name of the special wedding programme limited to one pair per day at Tokyo Disneyland's Cinderella Castle. Weddings, known as Disney Fairy Tale Wedding, can be done in three places in Tokyo Disneyland, Tokyo Disneyland's Cinderella Castle, Disney Ambassador Hotel, and Tokyo DisneySea's Hotel Mira Costa.) in which the Cinderella Castle opens wedding ceremonies for ordinary guests in the park. Upon this, Higashi contacted the resort to have a same-sex wedding, although the use of same-sex was said to be satisfactory, due to the "influence on ordinary customers", they answered that either one had to wear a tuxedo (the men's costume). When it was sent in Twitter, the critical response to Disney's response has expanded. Then, the Tokyo Disney Resort confirmed with The Walt Disney Company in the United States, Higashi withdrew her previous answer and said that a "wedding with the same sex is possible", and publicly announced that it was not a special case and that weddings by same-sex couples can also be admitted at Tokyo Disneyland. The couple announced that "Disney will fulfill their dreams again" and their voice of joy rises, Higashi and her partner later visited Tokyo Disneyland to express their gratitude. (Note: An article photo from the Mainichi Shimbun can be seen in First Film staff blog 14 about the same-sex marriage. The Royal Dream Wedding and Fairy Tale Wedding were confused at the blog entry.) The incident became "one of the major movements representing 2012 for the (LGBT) community", in the same year Higashi and her partner received the Tokyo SuperStar Awards Community Award in which it recognizes people or organizations that contributed to the development of the LGBT culture or community. Later on 1 March 2013, Higashi cited the ceremony at Tokyo DisneySea, and became the first couple who made the same-sex wedding ceremony at Disney Resort in Japan.

== "Partnership Certificate" in Shibuya ==
Tokyo's Shibuya Ward is the first Japanese municipality that decided to issue "partnership certificates" to same-sex couples, after its assembly voted in favour of an ordinance containing this policy on 31 March 2015. Applications for these certificates started on 28 October of the same year. Higashi and her partner applied for the certificate and on 5 November they became the first couple to receive such a certificate from a Japanese municipality. While the policy of LGBT partnership systems has been spreading across Japan and hundreds of other couples have followed in Higashi's footsteps, she and her partner have since split up and returned their partnership certificate to Shibuya Ward.

== Bibliography ==
| Year | Title | ISBN | Notes |
|---|---|---|---|
| 2014 | Futari no Mama kara, kimi-tachi e | ISBN 978-4781690629 | Co-written with Hiroko Masuhara, who was her partner at the time |
| 2014 | Lesbian-teki Kekkon Seikatsu | ISBN 978-4781611075 | Manga; co-written with Masuhara; illustrated by Emiko Sugiyama |
| 2014 | Nakatta koto ni shitakunai – Jippu kara Sei Gyakutai o Uketa Watashi no Kokuhaku | ISBN 978-4062188326 | |
