= Seiji Miyane =

Japanese television presenter (born 1963)

- 宮根 誠司
- Born: April 27, 1963 (age 63); Ōda, Shimane, Japan
- Education: Kansai University
- Occupation: Announcer / television presenter / actor
- Years active: 1987–present
- Agent(s): Asahi Broadcasting Corporation (1987–2004); Freelance announcer (2004–present)
- Website: Seiji Miyane Official

Seiji Miyane (Japanese: 宮根 誠司; born April 27, 1963) is a Japanese announcer, television presenter, and professional wrestling promoter. He is best known as the long-time main host of the daytime infotainment program Jōhō Live Miyane-ya, as well as the Sunday night news program Mr. Sunday.

== Career ==
Miyane was born and raised in Ōda, Shimane, Shimane Prefecture. He later moved to Osaka to study economics at Kansai University.

Although he had not originally intended to become an announcer, he applied to Asahi Broadcasting Corporation (ABC) after seeing a job posting at his university's career center, and was hired following a successful interview.

He joined ABC in 1987 and began his career as a radio announcer.

HHe gained regional recognition through the network's breakfast television program Ohayō Asahi desu, where he advanced from field reporter to sub-anchor in 1990 and became its main host in 1994. His frequent appearances on Kansai-based variety programs further increased his local popularity.

Before leaving ABC, Miyane developed close ties with several prominent Kansai entertainers, including Yashiki Takajin and Shōfukutei Tsurube II. Reports suggest that both encouraged his transition to freelance work.

After becoming a freelance announcer in 2004, Miyane achieved nationwide prominence as the host of Yomiuri TV’s daytime program Jōhō Live Miyane-ya. Initially broadcast only in the Kansai region upon its 2007 launch, the program gradually expanded to a nationwide network by September 2008, significantly increasing his national visibility. This transition significantly elevated Miyane's profile on a national level. He continued to be based in Osaka for some time even after gaining nationwide recognition.

Miyane established his own talent agency, Take Off Co., Ltd., in 2010 and announced that he would begin expanding his activities in Tokyo. That same year, he began serving as the main host of Mr. Sunday, a Sunday night news program broadcast by Fuji TV.

He frequently serves as host for live television programs. Since 2009, he has hosted Best Hits Kayōsai, a large-scale annual live music program broadcast on Yomiuri TV, for 16 consecutive years.

Miyane primarily works as a television presenter, but he has occasionally appeared as an actor and voice actor. His notable roles include cameo appearances as himself in the Detective Conan film series, guest roles in the drama Hero and the NHK asadora Asa ga Kita, and a voice role in the film Poupelle of Chimney Town.

Since the 2020s, he has been a consistent part of special Dragongate shows, particularly with his own sporadically-scheduled self-produced shows The Gate of Miyane.

== Hosting style and characteristics ==
Miyane is known for using Kansai dialect, spoken in the Kansai region of Japan. In live broadcasts, he frequently asks unscripted, ad-libbed questions to newsroom announcers and commentators, and he often makes candid and sometimes sharp remarks about entertainment gossip. This forthright and incisive approach is regarded as a hallmark of his hosting style. However, his comments have occasionally drawn criticism from viewers and sparked controversy.

== Personal life ==
Miyane married in 1993 and had two children, but the couple divorced in July 2004. He remarried another woman in August 2006, and their daughter was born in May 2011. However, in 2023, it was revealed that they had divorced sometime during the previous year.

== Filmography (selected works) ==
=== Announcer / TV Host ===
Program / Work	Network / Studio	Period / Release	Role / Notes	Ref.
Jōhō Live Miyane-ya	Yomiuri TV	2004–present	Main host	
Mr. Sunday	Fuji TV / Kansai TV co-production	2010–present	Main host	
Best Hits Kayōsai	Yomiuri TV	2009–present	Host (special annual program)	
24 Hour Television: Love Saves The Earth	Nippon TV	2009–2012, 2014, 2016–present	Host (special program)	
Miyane Seiji no nihon mouke banashi	Fuji TV	2019–present	Host (annual, Dec 30)	
Sekai houtei mystery	Fuji TV	2012–present	Host	
Ohayō Asahi desu	ABC	−2010	Morning show host	
Takajin no sokomade itte iinkai	Yomiuri TV	Past	Panel / Host	
Miyane no No.1	Kansai TV	2014–2021	MC	

=== Actor / Voice actor ===
==== Television Dramas ====
Year	Title	Role	Broadcaster	Notes	Ref.
2014	Hero 2	News anchor	Fuji TV	Guest appearance (final episode)	
2016	Asa ga Kita	President of a life-insurance company	NHK	NHK asadora	

==== Films ====
Year	Title	Role	Distributor	Notes	Ref.
2002	Mr. Rookie	Boss	Toho		
2007	Hero	TV Reporter	Toho		
2013	Angel Home	Announcer	Toei		

===== Voice acting =====
Year	Title	Role	Distributor	Notes	Ref.
2011	Detective Conan: Quarter of Silence	Journalist	Toho	—	
2012	Detective Conan: The Eleventh Striker	Himself (voice)	Toho	Cameo appearance	
2020	Poupelle of Chimney Town	Toshiaki (voice)	Toho	—	
