= Poupelle of Chimney Town =

2020 Japanese animated film by Yusuke Hirota

- Theatrical release poster

Japanese name
- Kanji: えんとつ町のプペル
Transcriptions
- Revised Hepburn: Entotsu-machi no Poupelle
- Directed by: Yusuke Hirota
- Screenplay by: Akihiro Nishino
- Based on: Poupelle of Chimney Town by Akihiro Nishino
- Produced by: Yusuke Kitahashi; Ryoichi Fukuyama; Eiko Tanaka
- Starring: Masataka Kubota; Mana Ashida
- Edited by: Kiyoshi Hirose
- Music by: Youki Kojima; Yuta Bandoh
- Production companies: Studio 4°C; Yoshimoto Kogyo
- Distributed by: Toho; Yoshimoto Kogyo
- Release date: December 25, 2020 (Japan)
- Running time: 101 minutes
- Country: Japan
- Language: Japanese

Poupelle of Chimney Town (Japanese: えんとつ町のプペル, Hepburn: Entotsu-machi no Poupelle) is a 2020 Japanese animated fantasy film animated by Studio 4°C, directed by Yusuke Hirota, and featuring character designs by Atsuko Fukushima. It was distributed by Toho and Yoshimoto Kogyo. It is based on the 2016 children's picture book of the same name by Akihiro Nishino. The story was adapted as a play on January 21–26, 2020, and a musical on November 14–28, 2021, while a sequel titled Chimney Town: Frozen in Time was released on March 27, 2026.

== Plot ==
Lubicchi's father lives in Chimney Town, a town covered in thick smoke. He used to tell a story about the obscured stars outside the smoke, to the dismissal of the town's citizens. On Halloween Day, a monster assembles from trash in a landfill. After entering the city, a child finds out its true nature and calls a police force called the Inquisitors. A girl then helps him flee to a dumpster, but he is sent to be incinerated in a garbage truck. Lubicchi, after seeing the monster call for help, pulls it out. Both then try to flee.

After the two accidentally activate the mine cart they fell into, Lubicchi sees the clear sky, but now has to walk home. During the walk, he asks the monster to be his friend. After Lubicchi realizes the monster doesn't have a name, he names the monster Poupelle and invites it home. However, a talkative thief, Scoop, stumbles upon them and offers three wishes if they keep his work a secret. The duo asks for the exit as their first wish, and he explodes a way out for them, and they make their way home. In the past, Lubicchi's father, Bruno, makes a bracelet together with him, also explaining how smoke works, and in the present, a search for Poupelle begins.

The next day, Lubicchi's boss, Dan, takes Poupelle to sew clothes in hiding. Later, Lubicchi takes Poupelle to Lubicchi's chimney sweeping job in disguise, and his colleagues are suspicious. Poupelle then teases him for being afraid of heights and asks if he has ever dropped anything. He tells about a bracelet from his father he dropped. After reaching the top, Lubicchi tells Poupelle Bruno's story, although he is uncertain of its veracity. In a flashback, Bruno fights other people after they doubt the story and break Lubicchi's bracelet, and gives his bracelet to Lubicchi as a result. After telling the story, he tells Poupelle to keep it secret.

A few days later, Poupelle gets discovered by some children. After telling Lubicchi's story, the children explain Bruno's death, being eaten by monsters after jumping off the Forbidden Cliff. He then realizes he inherited Bruno's tailor business. He then tells about Lubicchi's dream and the children laugh as a result. A child, Antonio ends up fighting him, and Poupelle falls into a lake. Later, while Lubicchi enters the tailor shop to fix his shirt. Mr. Suu, Lubicchi's colleague, warns him heresy is not tolerated in the city. Lubicchi then dreams of the past, where his dad tells him to find his missing hat on the roof, but he falls down, but his dad saved him.

Lubicchi goes home, but sees the Inquisitors interrogating his mother, who finds out they killed Bruno. After entering, his mother begs him to not break the law, as she does not want to lose another family member. The Inquisitors then leave, and Mr. Suu is revealed to be a part of the task force. Meanwhile, Dan falls from a chimney and is heavily injured, and was almost taken by the Inquisitors before being sent to the hospital. On his way home from the hospital, Antonio finds Lubicchi and blames Poupelle for the town's recent asthma cases and also picks up on Poupelle's smell. After arriving at Poupelle's shop, he confronts him and Poupelle breaks down as a result.

Poupelle comes back to Lubicchi's house, saying his smell came from searching for Bruno's bracelet in the landfill, and says that the bracelet was actually in his body, but is impossible to remove. Lubicchi then says he wants to be together with Poupelle, so he can see the bracelet again. Poupelle suddenly attracts a sunken ship into the city, and Lubicchi realizes his father's story was true after recognizing the ship. He goes to Scoop, asking for the smokeless explosives he previously used to blow a tunnel for him, and Scoop finds out Lubicchi is Bruno's son. He then tells the story of the city. 250 years ago, there was a capitalistic anarchy outside the city. An economist, Silvio Letter creates a form of money, "L", that decays over time after seeing everything spoils but money, returning peace to the city. This angered the Central Bank, who arrest Letter and abolish The L, returning the town to anarchy. Pro-L rebels, including Letter's son, then found a new country, Chimney Town, away from the Central Bank's influence and cut it off from the outside world. They created smoke to block the sky. Scoop then tells Lubicchi that he met Bruno in a bar and told him this story, then tells Lubicchi the powder has to explode in a crowded place before giving him the explosive.

Lubicchi and his friends assemble a bomb on the ship, but are found out by the Inquisitors. People crowd at the beach, so Scoop, as Lubicchi's third wish, rambles to the Inquisitors to buy Lubicchi and Poupelle time. However, Scoop accidentally reveals their plan. The Inquisitors threaten his mother after supporting Lubicchi's speech, but the chimney sweepers fight them. Meanwhile, Antonio and his friends unanchor the ship, and it begins flying. However, stormy skies impede them, and Lubicchi's hat, along with Poupelle's coat, flies away. Lubicchi finally activates the bomb, but almost falls off the boat. The bomb then explodes, showing the starry night sky. Meanwhile, Poupelle returns Lubicchi's hat before deassembling, giving Lubicchi's bracelet back, and his soul floats away. As a result of the event, Chimney Town decides to stop producing smoke, revealing the city's scenery for the first time.

== Production ==
The film is based on a picture book authored by Japanese actor and comedian Akihiro Nishino, who also wrote the screenplay and served as an executive producer.

The opening theme song is a new arrangement of "Halloween Party" performed by Hyde. Nishino had written the opening scene of the original book based on the song and requested it for use in the film.

The film premiered in Japan on December 25, 2020, and was initially set to premier worldwide in 2021, ultimately being released in the United States on December 30, 2021. The first three minutes are being streamed online with English subtitles. The English dub premiered at the Animation Is Film festival in Los Angeles on October 23, 2021. The dub features the voices of Tony Hale, Antonio Raul Corbo, Stephen Root and Hasan Minhaj.

== Cast ==
Character	Japanese	English
Poupelle	Masataka Kubota	Tony Hale
Lubicchi (Louie)	Mana Ashida	Antonio Raul Corbo
Bruno	Shinosuke Tatekawa	Stephen Root
Lola	Eiko Koike	Misty Lee
Scoop	Shingo Fujimori	Hasan Minhaj
Antonio	Sairi Ito	Tristan Allerick Chen
Toshiaki	Seiji Miyane	Ray Chase
Dorothy	Rina Honnizumi	Kari Wahlgren
Rebecca	Sumire Morohoshi	Candace Kozak
Letter the 15th	Shosei Ohira	Aleks Le
Patch	Takaya Yamauchi	Mick Wingert
Dan	Jun Kunimura	James Mathis
Claire	—N/a	Laura Post
Mr. Suu	Kazuki Iio	Greg Chun
Toppo	—N/a	Fred Tatasciore

== Accolades ==
Year	Award	Category	Recipient	Result	Ref
2021	44th Japan Academy Film Prize	Excellent Animation of the Year	Poupelle of Chimney Town	Nominated	
