= Sumika (given name) =

- Gender: Female

Origin
- Origin: Japanese
- Meaning: Different meanings depending on the kanji used

Sumika (written: 純夏, 鈴美香 or すみ花) is a feminine Japanese given name. Notable people with the name include:

- Sumika Minamoto (源 純夏; born 1979), Japanese swimmer
- Sumika Nono (野々 すみ花; born 1987), Japanese actress
- Sumika Yamamoto (山本 鈴美香; born 1949), Japanese manga artist
- Sumika Yanagawa (柳川 澄樺; born 1991), Japanese professional wrestler

== Fictional characters ==
- Sumika Kagami (鑑 純夏), a character in the visual novel series Muv-Luv
- Sumika Murasame (村雨 純夏), protagonist of the manga series Sasameki Koto
- Sumika Shiun (紫雲 清夏), a character in the game Gakuen Idolmaster
