= Yusuke Hirota =

Japanese anime director

Yusuke Hirota (廣田 裕介, Hirota Yūsuke) is a Japanese anime director best known for his directorial debut film, Poupelle of Chimney Town.

After studying fluid mechanics at Keio University Faculty of Science and Engineering, he decided not to pursue a career in this field and instead entered Digital Hollywood University to study CGI. As a child, he had fallen in love with anime after watching Dragon Ball and Gundam, and the success of Pixar's computer-animated film Toy Story later convinced him that it was possible to make a living from CGI animation. Hirota then submitted his portfolio to several companies that used CGI, among which Studio 4°C was the only anime company.

Hirota started working at Studio 4°C as CG animator and was made the chief of the studio's CGI section. He worked on the CGI of various anime series and films, including the 2019 film Children of the Sea. At Studio 4°C, he had always said that he wanted to be a director, and in 2017 he was asked by Eiko Tanaka, producer of Poupelle of Chimney Town, to become the director of this film. At that time, Hirota was aware of the picture book on which the film was to be based, but had never read it; however, he agreed to direct the film, partly because he was sympathetic to the idea of adapting a children's book as he had just become a father to a child himself.

The book's author, Akihiro Nishino, had actually wanted to make a film out of the story of Poupelle of Chimney Town even before publishing it as a picture book, and started writing a completely new script for the film. Hirota met with Nishino once every two weeks and worked on the scenario for a total of about half a year. They finally finished the manuscript after about 15 drafts.

Poupelle of Chimney Town premiered in Japan on December 25, 2020. A sequel titled "Poupelle of Chimney Town – The Promised Clock Tower", released on March 27, 2026, is also directed by Hirota.
