= Asa ga Kita =

Japanese Television Drama

- Also known as: Sunshiny Asa; Here Comes Asa!; (WakuWaku Japan)
- Genre: Drama
- Written by: Mika Ōmori
- Directed by: Shinichi Nishitani; Shinzō Nitta; Yoshiharu Sasaki; Hirokazu Ozaki; Ryōhei Nakano; Kō Suzuki
- Starring: Haru; Hiroshi Tamaki; Shinobu Terajima; Takeshi Masu; Tasuku Emoto; Dean Fujioka; Hiroki Miyake; Tomochika; Akito Kiriyama; Fuka Koshiba; Kaya Kiyohara; Kōji Seto; Takurō Tatsumi; Hisako Manda; Yoichi Hayashi; Jun Fubuki; Masaomi Kondō; Aoi Miyazaki
- Narrated by: Keiko Sugiura
- Opening theme: "365 nichi no Kamihikouki" by AKB48
- Composer: Yuki Hayashi
- Country of origin: Japan
- Original language: Japanese
- No. of episodes: 156

Production
- Executive producer: Motohiko Sano
- Producers: Toshitake Fukuoka; Kumano Ritsuji
- Production locations: Osaka, Japan
- Running time: 15 minutes
- Production company: NHK Osaka

Original release
- Network: NHK
- Release: September 28, 2015 – April 2, 2016

Asa ga Kita (あさが来た, Here Comes Asa!) is a Japanese television drama series which was broadcast by the 93rd Asadora (morning drama) six days a week on NHK between September 28, 2015 and April 2, 2016. It is based on the life of Asako Hirooka. It was followed by Toto Neechan on April 4.

A period drama, Asa ga Kita is set during the Bakumatsu and Meiji period, when Japan was undergoing rapid sociopolitical change.

== Plot ==
=== Undaunted by Repeated Setbacks (weeks 1–13) ===
Asa is a naughty and curious daughter of a Kyoto merchant who wants to pursue studies in business, and is displeased with her father's arrangement for her marriage into the Shirooka merchant family in Osaka. However, her fiance Shinjirō gives her an abacus and encourages her to act on her own will, and her family agree to let her learn accounting.

Years later, Asa marries into the Shirooka family, and her in-laws allow her to study and work. Asa bravely stands up when the Shinsengumi force the family to lend them money, earning respect from them, her new family and its employees. Meanwhile, her older sister Hatsu has married into another family which strictly controls her.

In 1868, a financial crisis strikes. Asa helps her family survive by reassuring creditors and starting a new venture into coal mining. Hatsu's family goes bankrupt and are forced to hide from their creditors. With the help of Shinjirō, Asa finds them living in poverty; Hatsu has a boy after being abandoned by her husband. A samurai friend, Saisuke Godai (later Tomoatsu Godai), is able to find the husband and reunite the family.

Asa is pressured by her mother-in-law to have a child, and when Hatsu becomes pregnant again it is suggested that Shinjirō take a concubine. The couple struggles with the pressures and responsibilities before confessing their feelings and deciding to be faithful to each other.

Hatsu and her family leave to become tangerine farmers, on a plot of land in Wakayama provided by her father. Asa travels to the coal mine in Kyushu to attend to the business and discovers that she is pregnant. Shinjirō escorts her back to Osaka where she has a girl, Chiyo. There is sabotage at the coal mine by a worker who had been Shinjirō's childhood friend, seeking revenge for his family falling into poverty after Shinjirō's family refused to support them. Shinjirō withdraws further from the Shirooka business, giving power to Asa.

In 1878, Godai invites Asa to Tokyo to witness its advanced development; her parents and younger brother return from overseas. Godai introduces Asa to notable figures, including his friend Ōkubo Toshimichi. Later, after Ōkubo is assassinated, Asa comforts Godai who swears to finish his friend's dreams.

=== The Soft Heart (weeks 14–26) ===
The servant Fuyu confesses her love for Shinjirō and willingness to be his concubine (as had previously been discussed) but is rejected. The man her father intended her to marry sees them together, and declines the arrangement. Kisuke, a Shirooka business manager who has loved Fuyu for a long time, proposes to her. Fuyu is touched and accepts, and the couple later go to the coal mine to monitor the workers for Asa.

Shinjirō's younger brother Eizaburō marries Sachi. Asa wants to reorganize the family business as a bank, which frustrates Eizaburō and head manager Gansuke as Asa gains control of the business.

Inn hostess Miwa provides a place for business people to socialise, and starts to serve foreign food. Shinjirō begins managing social affairs for Osaka business people, finding an important role to support Asa in the family business. At this time, Chiyo becomes discontented with her workaholic mother. In 1885, Godai dies in poor health, exhausted due to his devotion to the development of Japan.

Hatsu's first son, Ainosuke, begs to work in the Shirooka family business, and he is welcomed as part of the family. By 1891, the family's comprehensive shop for goods transactions and their investments in the textile industry have gained profit. Eizaburō has a daughter and moves his family to a separate residence. Chiyo becomes more displeased with her busy mother and fonder of her gentle aunt Hatsu.

Later, Asa decides to hire female staff for the bank, to give young girls a chance to work. Izumi Narusawa seeks Asa's help to create a women's university, and Asa begins to drum up support from notable people.

(to be added)

== Characters ==
=== Cast ===
Shirooka family

- Haru as Asa
  - Rio Suzuki as childhood Asa
- Hiroshi Tamaki as Shinjirō, Asa's husband
- Masaomi Kondō as Shōkichi, Shinjirō's father
- Jun Fubuki as Yono, Shinjirō's mother
- Fuka Koshiba as Chiyo, Asa's daughter
  - Rio Suzuki as childhood Chiyo
- Yoshikazu Kiuchi as Shōtarō, Shinjirō's older brother
- Akito Kiriyama as Eizaburō, Shinjirō's younger brother
- Miyu Yagyu as Sachi, Eizaburō's wife
- Asuka Kudō as Keisuke, Chiyo's husband

Shirooka family's employees

- Takaya Yamauchi as Gansuke
- Hiroki Miyake as Kisuke
- Tomochika as Ume, Asa's dowry maid
- Kaya Kiyohara as Fuyu, Hatsu's dowry maid and her daughter Natsu
- Shigeo Tsujimoto as Heijūrō Yamazaki, the elite employee of the company

Mayuyama family

- Aoi Miyazaki as Hatsu, Asa's older sister
  - Manase Moridono as young Hatsu
- Tasuku Emoto as Sōbei, Hatsu's husband
- Takurō Tatsumi as Eitatsu, Sōbei's father
- Hisako Manda as Kiku, Sōbei's mother
- Daichi Morishita as Ainosuke, Hatsu's elder son
- Daigo Nishihata as Yōnosuke, Hatsu's younger son
- Remi Terashita as Setsu, Yōnosuke's wife

Imai family

- Shinobu Terajima as Rie, Asa's mother
- Takeshi Masu as Tadaoki, Asa's father
- Yoichi Hayashi as Tadamasa, Asa's paternal grandfather
- Shōtarō Okitsu as Kyūtarō/Tadatsugu, Asa's younger brother
- Tokiko Satō as Towa, Tadatsugu's wife

Coal miners

- Ginnojō Yamazaki as Jirosaku
- Yasuko Tomita as Kazu, Jirosaku's wife
- Zen Kajiwara as Genkichi Miyabe, coal mine manager
- Keishi Nagatsuka as Satoshi/Matsuzō, Shinjirō's childhood friend

Historical figures

- Dean Fujioka as Tomoatsu Godai
- Shuji Kashiwabara as Toshimichi Ōkubo, one of the three great nobles
- Koji Yamamoto as Toshizō Hijikata, deputy leader of the Shinsengumi
- Tetsuya Takeda as Yukichi Fukuzawa, the founder of Keio University
- Yūji Miyake as Eiichi Shibusawa, the "father of Japanese capitalism"
- Hideki Takahashi as Shigenobu Ōkuma, the founder of Waseda University
- Keiko Matsuzaka as Ayako Ōkuma, Shigenobu's wife
- Yuko Oshima as Raicho Hiratsuka, feminist

Others

- Shōfukutei Tsurube II as Tomonobu Tamari
- Yoshino Kimura as Soe Kushida
- Kōji Seto as Izumi Narusawa
- Sumika Nono as Miwa, Shinjirō's shamisen teacher and inn keeper
- Shōzō Uesugi as Hikosaburo Hino, Fuyu's father
- Riho Yoshioka as Nobu Tamura, Chiyo's school friend
- Yumiko Takahashi as Funa Tamura, Nobu's mother
- LaSalle Ishii as Yozaemon Yorozuya
- Ikkei Watanabe as Dr. Kensaku Ōtsuka
- Seiji Miyane as Nobuo Furuta
- Sadatomo Matsudaira as Iwao Tominaga
- Tomomitsu Yamaguchi as Kazutomi Ishikawa

=== Family Tree ===
Tadamasa Imai
Shōkichi Shirooka	Yono	Etatsu	Kiku Mayuyama	Tadaoki Imai	Rie
Shōtarō Shirooka	Eizaburō Shirooka	Sachi	Sōbei Mayuyama	Hatsu	Shinjirō Shirooka	Asa	Tadatsugu Imai	Towa
Sae Shirooka	Masa Shirooka	Ainosuke Mayuyama	Yōnosuke Mayuyama	Setsu	Chiyo Shirooka	Keisuke	The Imai Children
Tatsuo Mayuyama	The unborn second child	Tatsuko Shirooka	Etsuko Shirooka	Satsuko Shirooka	The unborn fourth child

Note: Those who don't have a surname displayed in tree means he/she change his/her surname upon marrying someone. Characters without name were mentioned but did not appear in the drama.

=== Role Models ===
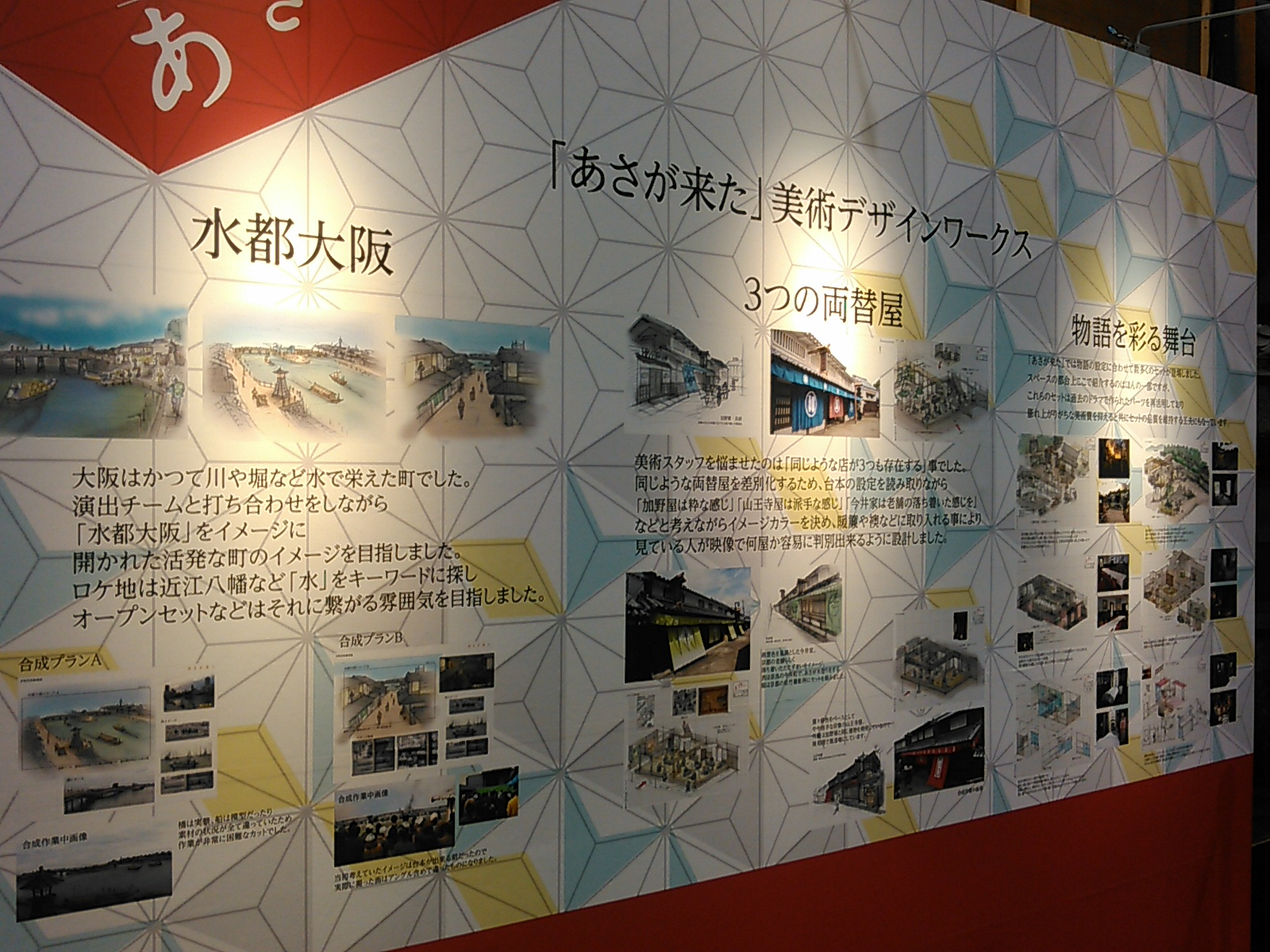
Sets of Asa ga Kita

Character	Model	Differences
Asa Shirooka	Asako Hirooka	Asako is a child of concubine.; Asako submitted to Christianity while Asa remained agnostic.
Hatsu Mayuyama	Haru Mitsui	Asako's half-sister born to another concubine.; She died at age 25, while Hatsu lived for a long time and had grandchildren.
Shinjirō Shirooka	Shingorō Hirooka	He is 8 years older than Asako while Shinjirō is 11 years older than Asa.; He took Asako's handmaid Mume after Asako lost her fertility, and had 3 daughters and a son with her.
Ume and Fuyu	Mume (Ofuji)	Asako's handmaid and Shingorō's concubine. She gave birth to 4 of Shingorō's children.
Tadaoki Imai	Takayoshi Mtsui	Asako's father, who had her aged 50. He died at the age of 59.
Chiyo Shirooka	Kameko Hirooka	Asako's only daughter. She had 4 daughters and a son.
Eizaburō Shirooka	Masaaki Hirooka	Shingorō's younger brother.
Keisuke Shirooka	Ezou Hirooka	Son of Suenori Hidoriyanagi, a viscount; Kameko's husband, married into Hirooka family.

== Reception ==
Asa ga Kita was a ratings success, averaging 23.5% over the length of the series, the highest rating for an Asadora since the year 2000.

== Spin-off drama Warenabe ni Tojibuta ==
The main character is Kisuke. It was broadcast starting April 23, 2016.

Cast

- Hiroki Miyake as Kisuke
- Rie Tomosaka as Satsuki
- Takaya Yamauchi as Gansuke
- Tomochika as Ume
- Akito Kiriyama as Eizaburō
- Sumika Nono as Miwa
- Kaya Kiyohara as Fuyu
- Shōzō Uesugi as Hikosaburo Hino
- Jun Fubuki as Yono
- Hiroshi Tamaki as Shinjirō
- Haru as Asa

== Awards ==
Award	Category	Nominees	Result	Ref.
9th Tokyo Drama Awards	The Grand Prix	Asa ga Kita	Won	
9th Tokyo Drama Awards	Best Actress	Haru	Won	
9th Tokyo Drama Awards	Best Supporting Actor	Dean Fujioka	Won	

== International broadcast ==
Country	Channel	Series premiere	Title
Bangladesh	RTV	February 15, 2022	(Here Comes Asa!)
Sri Lanka	TV Derana	January 1, 2020	(Asa)

Preceded by Mare	Asadora; September 28, 2015 – April 2, 2016	Succeeded by Toto Neechan
