= Consulate of the United States, Nagoya =

Architectural structure

U.S. Consulate Nagoya
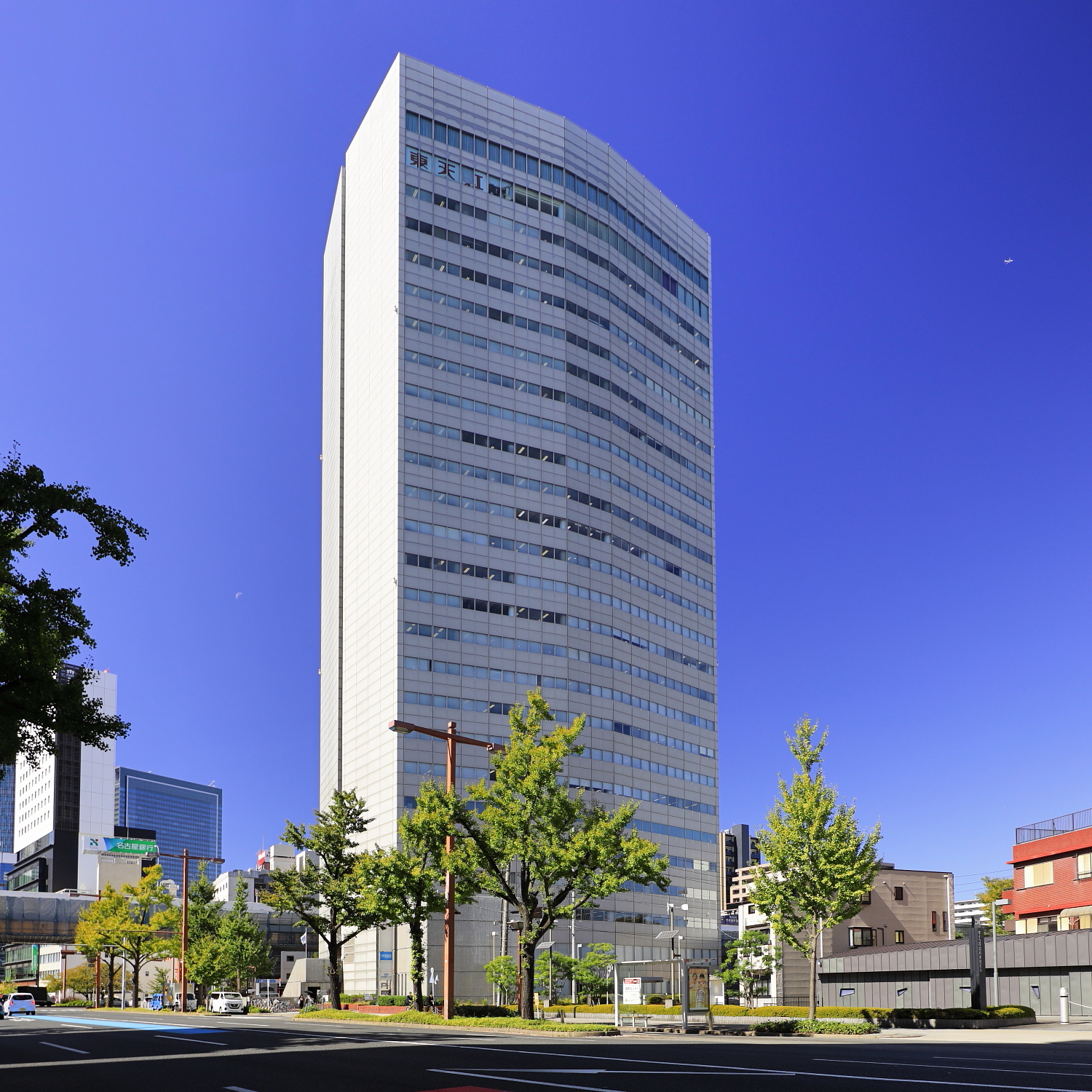
- Location: Japan
- Address: Nagoya International Center Bldg. 6F, 1-47-1 Nagono, Nakamura-ku, Nagoya, Aichi Prefecture 450-0001
- Coordinates: 35°10′22.1″N 136°53′25″E
- Consul General: Anna Wang
- Website: jp.usembassy.gov

The Consulate of the United States, Nagoya (Japanese: 在名古屋米国領事館) is a consular post of the United States in Nagoya, Aichi Prefecture, Japan.

The consulate has a public relations division known as the Nagoya American Center (Nagoya American Center, NAC).

== History ==
On July 3, 1920, the consulate was established in Higashi-ku, Nagoya by Consul Harry Franklin Hawley. Due to worsening relations between Japan and the U.S., the consulate was closed on December 31, 1940. Following the attack on Pearl Harbor by the Imperial Japanese Navy on December 7, 1941, both nations entered a state of war. The consulate in Nagoya remained closed throughout the war.

On March 1, 1950, the "Nagoya American Consular Service" was opened. On April 29, 1952, with the enactment of the Treaty of San Francisco, the post was again renamed to the "Consulate of the United States, Nagoya". The consulate was once more closed in 1970.

In 1984, the Nagoya American Center was established on the 6th floor of the Nagoya International Center Building, aiming to promote U.S.-Japan relations through PR activities. During the 1980s, when the center was founded, the U.S. was facing a historic trade deficit, while Japan had a significant trade surplus, leading to intense trade friction between the two nations.

In March 1986, the U.S. Consulate Kobe's Nagoya branch office was established. This marked the return of American diplomats to Nagoya after a 16-year absence.

On December 2, 1993, the Consulate of the United States, Nagoya was reopened after 23 years. The opening ceremony was attended by U.S. Ambassador to Japan Walter F. Mondale.

In March 2005, the consulate moved to the 6th floor of the Nagoya International Center Building, where the Nagoya American Center was located, and the center was incorporated into the consulate's public relations division.

== Chief consul ==
Name	Start date	End date	Notes
Frank W. Stanley	1994	1996	
Daniel L. Shields	1996	1999	
Hugh Carl Gettinger	?	?	Recorded in service in 2001
Gary G. Oba	2002	2005	
Daniel A. Rochman	2005	2008	
Myungsoo Max Kwak	2008	2010	
Jonas D. Stewart	2010	2011	
Harry R. Sullivan	2011	2014	
Jessica T. Webb	2014	2016	
Gary Schaefer	2016	2019	
Adam W. Green	2019	2021	
Daniel K. Stewart	2021	Present	
Anna Wang	2024	Present	
