= Sumika Nono =

Japanese actress (born 1987)

- 野々 すみ花
- Born: 27 February 1987 (age 39); Kumiyama, Kuse District, Kyoto, Japan
- Occupation: Actress
- Years active: 2005–present
- Agent: Umeda Arts Theater (2012–)
- Style: Stage; television drama
- Height: 1.61 m (5 ft 3 in)
- Website: Official website

Sumika Nono (野々 すみ花, Nono Sumika; born 27 February 1987 in Kumiyama, Kuse District, Kyoto) is a Japanese actress. She is a former top musumeyaku of the Soragumi of the Takarazuka Revue. She is nicknamed Sumika (すみか).

Nono is represented with Umeda Arts Theater. As a musumeyaku (playing young female characters) who was skilled in dancing, acting and singing, she was billed as "Takarazuka's Maya Kitajima" (after the lead character in the manga Glass Mask) and rose to become a top musumeyaku at the Takarazuka Revue in only five years. After leaving the revue Nono later performed in stage musicals and television dramas.

== During Takarazuka Revue ==
=== Hanagumi era ===
Year	Title	Role	Notes
2005	La vie en rose		
2005	Rakuyō no Palermo / Asian Winds!	Vittorio (child)	
2006	Scout	Jessica	
2006	Phantom	Erik (young) / Meg (minor)	
2006	Mind Traveler	Judy Kazan	
2007	Akechi Kogorō no Jiken-bo ― Kuro Tokage	Sanae / Tokage Kuro (minor)	First minor heroine
2007	The Dancing Girl	Ellis	First main heroine
2007	Hello Dancing!	Nana	
2007	Adeu Marsellie	Mirelle / Marianne (minor)	Minor heroine
2008	Melancholic Gigolo Abunai Sōzokujin / Love Symphony 2	Teena	
2008	Ai to Shino Arabia / Red hot Sea	Fahama / Samira (minor)	
2008	Fall Guy	Konatsu Mizuhara	Main heroine
2009	Taiō Shijinki	Talbi, Tamdok (child) / Kiha, Kazin (minor)	Minor heroine
2009	Oguri! Oguri Hanganmonokatari yori	Terutehime	Main heroine

=== Soragumi Top Musume era ===
Year	Title	Role
2009	Ōe Yamakaden: Moetsukite koso / Apasionado!! II	Fujiko / Fuji no Ha
2009	Casablanca	Ilza Land
2010	Shangri La: Mizuno Shiro	Miu
2010	Trafalgar: Nelson, sono Ai to Kiseki / Funky Sunshine	Emma, Lady Hamilton
2010	Fall Guy	Konatsu Mizuhara
2010	Daregatameni Kane wa Naru	Maria
2011	Valentino	June Masis
2011	Utsukushiki Shōgai: Mitsunari Ishida Eien no Ai to Yoshi / Lunarossa: Yoru ni Madou Tabibito	Yodo-dono
2011	Classico Italiano: Saikō no Otoko no Shitate-kata / Nice Guy!! Sono Otoko, Y ni Yoru Hōsoku	Mina Putti
2012	Kamen no Romanesque / Apasionado!! II	Marquess of Montuille
2012	Hanayaka narishi Hibi / Climax	Judy Rain

== After Takarazuka Revue ==
=== Stage ===
Year	Title	Role	Ref.
2013	Inori to Kaibutsu –Wilville no Sanshimai– Yukio Ninagawa Enshutsu Version	Retisha / Cassandra	
2013	Proof / Shōmei	Catherine	
2014	Ai no Uta o Utaou	Kaori	
2014	The Umbrellas of Cherbourg	Genevieve	
2015	Limelight	Terry	
2016	Love Letters: 2016 The Climax Special	Melissa	
2017	Kimi ga Jinsei no Toki		

=== TV drama ===
Year	Title	Role	Network	Notes	Ref.
2013	Keishichō Sōsaikka 9 Kakari season 8	Mikiko Sano	TV Asahi	Episode 6	
2013	Sakka Tantei Misa Yamamura	Natsuno	TV Tokyo		
2014	Yoshiwara Ura Dōshin	Usuzumi Tayū	NHK		
2015	Hoiku Tantei 25-ji: Shinichirō Hanasaki wa Nemurenai!!	Harumi Otsuki	TV Tokyo		
2015	Asa ga Kita	Miwa	NHK		
2016	Jūhan Shuttai!	Misato	TBS		
2016	Chō Nyūmon! Rakugo The Movie	Oaki	NHK		
2016	Keishichō Kidō Sōsa-tai 216	Nao Morikawa	TBS		

=== Other TV programmes ===
Year	Title	Network	Notes
2013	Hitachi: Sekai fushigi Hakken!	TBS	Mystery Hunter
2013	Risō no Koibito Zukan	KTV	Navigator
2014	Bi no Stylist	KTV	Navigator

=== Films ===
Year	Title	Role	Ref.
2016	Kansai Johnny's Jr. no Mezase	Yuko Wakui	
2018	When I Get Home, My Wife Always Pretends to be Dead		

=== Radio ===
Year	Title	Network	Ref.
2016	Seishun Adventure: Ame ni mo makezu Socha Ippuku	NHK FM	

== Awards ==
Year	Award
2007	Takarazuka Revue Year Award Newcomer Award
2010	Takarazuka Revue Year Award Excellence Award
