= 30th Yokohama Film Festival =

2009 film festival in Yokohama, Japan

- Location: Kannai Hall, Yokohama, Kanagawa, Japan
- Founded: 1980
- Festival date: 1 February 2009

The 30th Yokohama Film Festival (第30回ヨコハマ映画祭) was held on 1 February 2009 in Kannai Hall, Yokohama, Kanagawa, Japan.

== Awards ==
- Best Film: Yōjirō Takita – Departures
- Best Actor: Kaoru Kobayashi – Kyūka, Kanki no Uta
- Best Actress: Eiko Koike – The Kiss
- Best Supporting Actor: Hidetoshi Nishijima – Kyūka, Tokyo Rendezvous, Oka o Koete
- Best Supporting Actress:
  - Ryōko Hirosue – Departures
  - Kimiko Yo – Departures, Where the Legend Lives, Oka o Koete
- Best Director: Yōjirō Takita – Departures
- Best New Director: Yoshitaka Mori – Hyaku Hachi
- Best Screenplay: Kunitoshi Manda and Tamami Manda – The Kiss
- Best Cinematographer: Akiko Ashizawa – Tokyo Sonata, Kimi no Tomodachi, Flavor of Happiness
- Best New Talent:
  - Riisa Naka – Cafe Isobe
  - Anna Ishibashi – Kimi no Tomodachi
  - Sarara Tsukifune – The Most Beautiful Night in the World
- Special Jury Prize: Yoshitaka Mori – Hatsuratsu to Shite Suteki na Yokohama Eiga no Tanjō ni

== Best 10 ==
1. Departures
2. All Around Us
3. Still Walking
4. Children of the Dark
5. United Red Army
6. The Kiss
7. Tokyo Sonata
8. Climber's High
9. Kimi no Tomodachi
10. Kyūka

runner-up: One Million Yen Girl
