= 12th Japan Film Professional Awards =

Japanese film awards in 2003

- Date: 2003

The 12th Japan Film Professional Awards (第12回日本映画プロフェッショナル大賞) is the 12th edition of the Japan Film Professional Awards. Films of 2002 were eligible, with a focus on independent works not released by major distribution companies. An award ceremony did not take place.

== Awards ==
- Best Film: Harmful Insect
- Best Director: Akihiko Shiota (Harmful Insect)
- Best Director: Kunitoshi Manda (Unloved)
- Best Actress: Yoko Moriguchi (Unloved)
- Best Actor: Gorō Kishitani (Graveyard of Honor)
- Best New Director: Nami Iguchi (Inuneko)

== 10 best films ==
1. Harmful Insect (Akihiko Shiota)
2. KT (Junji Sakamoto)
3. Blue Spring (Toshiaki Toyoda)
4. Sorry (Shin Togashi)
5. Graveyard of Honor (Takashi Miike)
6. Unloved (Kunitoshi Manda)
7. Doing Time (Yoichi Sai)
8. Aiki (Daisuke Tengan)
9. Yoru o Kakete (Su Jin-kim)
10. The Laughing Frog (Hideyuki Hirayama)
10. Suicide Club (Sion Sono)
