= 18th Japan Film Professional Awards =

Japanese film awards in 2009

- Date: 2009

The 18th Japan Film Professional Awards (第18回日本映画プロフェッショナル大賞) is the 18th edition of the Japan Film Professional Awards. Films of 2008 were eligible, with a focus on independent works not released by major distribution companies. An award ceremony did not take place.

== Awards ==
- Best Film: Kiss
- Best Director: Kōji Wakamatsu (United Red Army)
- Best Actress: Eiko Koike (Kiss)
- Best Actor: Tatsuya Fujiwara (Chameleon)
- Best New Director: Kenji Nakanishi (Aoi Tori)
- Best Distinguished Service: Takeo Kimura (For his Guinness World Record for the oldest debut as a feature film director, and his longtime work.)
- Special: Kenichi Matsuyama (Detroit Metal City)
- Special: Shinjuku Joy Cinema (The theatre closed in 2009.)

== 10 best films ==
1. Kiss (Kunitoshi Manda)
2. Tokyo Sonata (Kiyoshi Kurosawa)
3. United Red Army (Kōji Wakamatsu)
4. All Around Us (Ryōsuke Hashiguchi)
5. Don't Laugh at My Romance (Nami Iguchi)
6. Still Walking (Hirokazu Kore-eda)
6. Children of the Dark (Junji Sakamoto)
8. Kimi no Tomodachi (Ryūichi Hiroki)
9. Chameleon (Junji Sakamoto)
10. Flavor of Happiness (Mitsuhiro Mihara)
