= Love Mooning =

- Film poster
- Directed by: Kunitoshi Manda
- Written by: Kunitoshi Manda; Tamami Manda
- Produced by: Kiki Sugino; Masahiro Iida
- Starring: Tōru Nakamura; Kiki Sugino; Takumi Saitoh; Yuri Nakamura; Taiyu Fujiwara; Yusuke Manda; Urara Matsubayashi; Bengal; Yoko Moriguchi; Hairi Katagiri
- Cinematography: Tatsuya Yamada
- Edited by: Kunitoshi Manda; Yukata Koide
- Music by: Hiroyuki Nagashima
- Distributed by: Aeon Entertainment Company; The Asahi Shimbun Company; Wa Entertainment
- Release date: 12 November 2021 (Japan)
- Running time: 102 minutes
- Country: Japan
- Language: Japanese

Love Mooning (Japanese: 愛のまなざしを) is a 2021 Japanese psychological romantic suspense film directed by Kunitoshi Manda, starring Tōru Nakamura, Kiki Sugino, Takumi Saitoh, Yuri Nakamura and Taiyu Fujiwara. It follows a psychiatrist and widower who falls in love with a patient of his, only for her to grow jealous once she learns that he is haunted by his late wife.

== Cast ==
- Tōru Nakamura as Takashi Takizawa
- Kiki Sugino as Ayako Mizuno
- Takumi Saitoh as Shigeru Uchiyama
- Yuri Nakamura as Kaoru Takizawa
- Taiyu Fujiwara as Yuki Takizawa
- Yusuke Manda as Goto
- Urara Matsubayashi as Nanako Mizuno
- Bengal as Shuji Uchiyama
- Yoko Moriguchi as Yuriko Mizuno
- Hairi Katagiri as Ikeda
- Shion Touno as Yuki's classmate

== Production ==
The film began as a project of actress and filmmaker Kiki Sugino. In 2017, she asked director Kunitoshi Manda, whom she had first met after the release of The Kiss, if he would be interested in making a film with her. He agreed as he had not had the opportunity to make a "commercial film" since The Kiss, and it was quickly decided that his wife and frequent collaborator Tamami would write the script. Sugino had written several potential plot outlines, and Manda selected the one he felt was the most "realistic". Manda provided Tamami with the outline, after which she began working on the first draft, which was completed "relatively quickly". From then on, he would make significant alterations, and she would go over them afterwards.

The role of Takashi was written almost entirely for Tōru Nakamura, another frequent collaborator of Manda's, as he wished to collaborate with Nakamura again. For this reason, the production schedule was planned to "suit" Nakamura. Though Sugino had not initially envisioned herself as the lead, Tamami Manda convinced her to play the role of Ayako. Yuri Nakamura was cast as Takashi's late wife Koru, while Takumi Saitoh was cast as Kaoru's brother Shigeru. Taiyu Fujiwara was offered the role of Yuki, Takashi's son, on his first audition. This was Fujiwara's film debut. Assistant producer Urara Matsubayashi and Yoko Moriguchi were cast as Ayako's little sister Nanako and mother Yuriko, respectively, while Bengal was cast as Shuji, Shigeru and Kaoru's father. Moriguchi had previously worked with Kunitoshi and Tamami Manda on Unloved. Yusuke Manda was cast as Goto, Ayako's partner who brings her to Takashi's clinic, while Hairi Katagiri was cast as Ikeda, an employee at the clinic.

Principal photography took place over 12 days in September 2019. It was shot on a schedule which required at least 10 minutes of "OK cuts" a day. The same house was used to depict the exterior of Ayako's family home, the interior of Shigeru's apartment and Takashi's son's room. Paintings by Hiroshi Minamikawa, an acquaintance of Manda, were displayed throughout the film. Due to complications from the arrival of Typhoon Faxai on 9 September, a filming location became unavailable, and a scene featuring an exchange between Shigeru and Ayako had to be consolidated into another scene with the latter's mother and sister.

Midway through filming, Manda decided that the ending would be altered. Originally, the film would end with Ayako dying in an "even more terrible way", such that Takashi would not forget her. It would then be revealed that Ayako has taken Kaoru's place in his mind as a "curse". However, in the finalised version of the script, Ayako convinces him to kill her such that she would be able to "save" him from Kaoru's "curse" by taking her place in his mind. Though he felt that the new ending was "forced", he thought that it improved over the previous ending, which was "typical" and "weak", by providing a resolution to the central romance. Due to this change, a scene had to be re-shot due to Kaoru's presence. The final scene of the film was initially set at a crosswalk. However, just before filming, the setting was changed to an underpass, which Sugino said could represent either Takashi's inability to escape or his liberation from his madness. Two different versions of the ending were shot as they reportedly could not decide on which to use. The assembly cut was around 130 minutes, of which roughly 30 minutes were cut from the theatrical version.

== Release ==
The film premiered at the 21st Tokyo Filmex Film Festival on 30 October 2020 as the festival's opening film. Manda was then the chair of the festival's jury. It opened in theatres nationwide on 12 November 2021.

== Reception ==
Kyoko Kanazawa of Cinemarche considered it a "wonderful" suspense film and lauded the performances of Tōru Nakamura, Sugino, Yuri Nakamura, Saitoh and Fujiwara. Shigeki Koga and Kahori Hattori of Kinema Junpo gave the film a rating of 4/5 stars and 3/5 stars respectively. Koga lauded Kunitoshi Manda's direction and Sugino's performance, writing that she was a "perfect fit for the role." Hattori considered the film a "matter of personal taste." Kurei Hibiki of Cinema Today also rated the film 3 stars out of 5. He opined that while the film retains many elements characteristic of Kunitoshi Manda films, and that it is "undoubtedly" an extension of Unloved and The Kiss, the script is disappointingly "weak". Junichi Inoue, also of Kinema Junpo was more critical, giving it a rating of 2/5 stars, finding that the film's base premise was unrealistic.
