= Hello Stranger =

Hello Stranger may refer to:

- Hello Stranger (song), a 1963 song by Barbara Lewis
- "Hello Stranger", a 1930s song by the Carter Family
- Hello Stranger (2010 film), a Thai film
- Hello Stranger, working title for Simulant (film), a 2023 Canadian thriller film
- Hello Stranger (2024 film), a Canadian short documentary film
- Hello! Stranger, a South Korean TV series
- Hello Stranger (web series), a 2020 Philippine web series
- Hello Stranger, a rock band with Juliette Commagere as lead singer, and its 2006 self-titled album
- "Hello Stranger", a song by Carrie Lucas from Horsin' Around, 1984
