= Tōru Nakamura =

Toru Nakamura may refer to:

- Tōru Nakamura (golfer) (中村 通, born 1950), Japanese golfer
- Tōru Nakamura (actor) (仲村 トオル, born 1965), Japanese actor
