= Mina Fujii =

Japanese actress

- 藤井 美菜
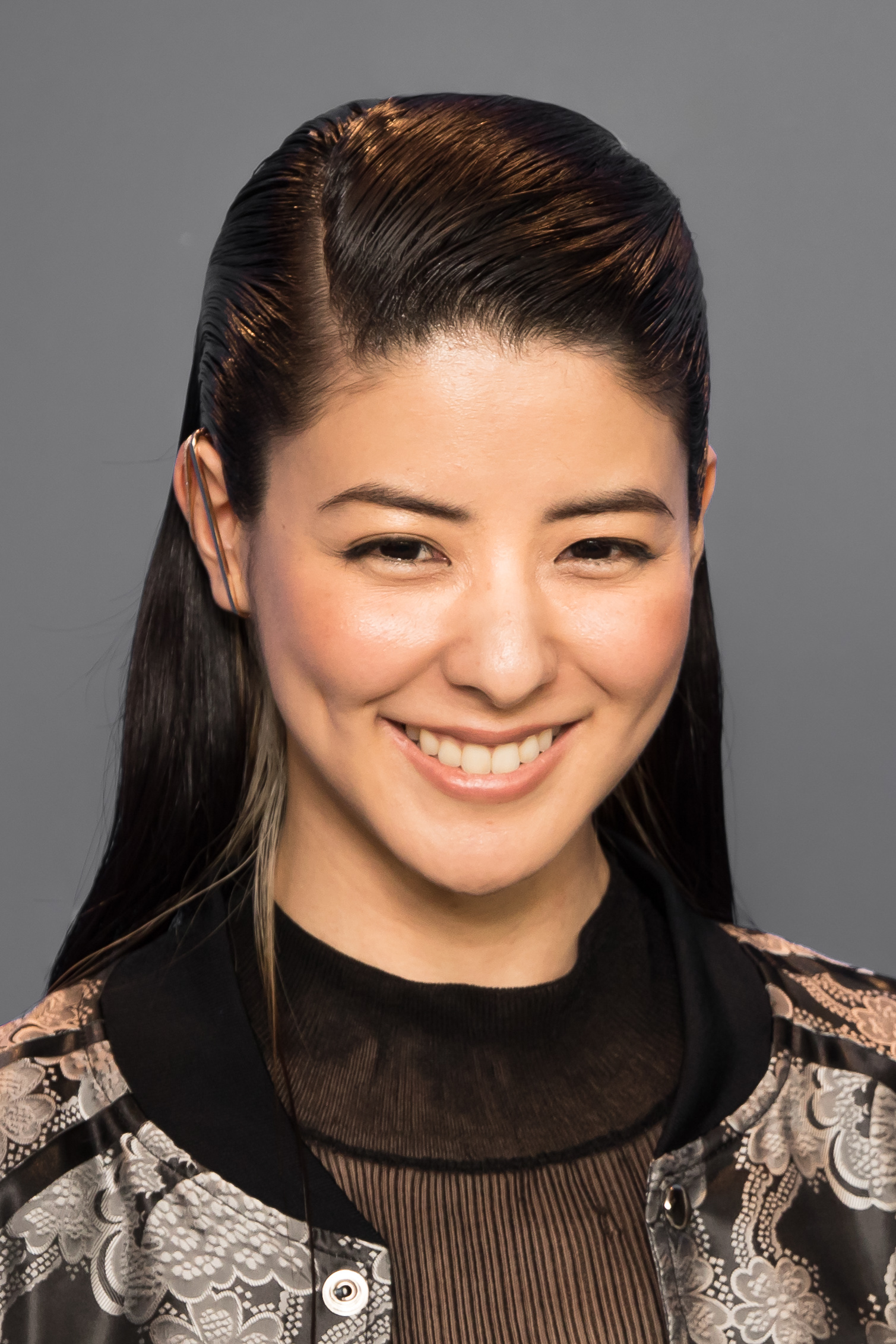
- Fujii at the 2018 Berlin International Film Festival
- Born: July 15, 1988 (age 38); San Diego, California, United States
- Education: Keio University
- Occupation: Actress
- Years active: 1998–present
- Agents: Humanite (Japan); Dragon Heart Global (Korea)
- Height: 1.66 m (5 ft 5 1/2 in)

Mina Fujii (藤井 美菜, Fujii Mina; born July 15, 1988) is a Japanese actress. She started her career in the entertainment industry at the age of nine. She is best known for her role in the TV adaptation of Bloody Monday, Kyōfu, and for appearing in TVXQ's "Dōshite Kimi o Suki ni Natte Shimattandarō?" music video.

== Career ==
Fujii made her film debut in 2006, when she played as Miki Onaka in Simsons. In 2008, Fujii played the leading character of Toru Ikegami in Ame No Tsubasa. In the same year, she starred as Aoi Asada in the live-action television drama adaptation of Bloody Monday.

In 2012, Fujii played a cameo of Mina in Panda and Hedgehog and Akiko in The King of Dramas.

In 2013, Fujii starred in the MBC reality show We Got Married Global alongside Lee Hongki. In 2014, Fujii played the character of Oshikiri in Monsterz, the Japanese remake of the Korean film Haunters, and Mika Aota in the tokusatsu comedy film Joshi Zu.

== Personal life ==
Fujii graduated from faculty of letters Keio University where she got Bachelor of Arts in human relations. Fujii writes a film critic column for Barfout. Fujii is fluent in Korean and English, in addition to her native Japanese.

== Filmography ==
=== Television dramas ===
Year	Title	Role	Network	Notes
2007	Broccoli	Inaho Yamasita	Fuji TV	
2008	Shikaotoko Aoniyoshi		Fuji TV	Episode 1–7,10
2008	The Fantastic Deer-Man	Masayo Sakura	Fuji TV	
2008	Team Batista		Fuji TV	Episode 4
2008	Bloody Monday	Aoi Asada	TBS	
2010	Bloody Monday Season 2	Aoi Asada	TBS	
2010	Shukumei 1969-2010	Akiko Shiroi	TV Asahi	
2010	Shaken Baby! Shakespeare Syndrome	Umino Azusa	CX	
2010	General Rouge no Gaisen	Eri Aoki	Fuji TV	Episode 2
2010	Tenshi no Wakemae	Keiko	NHK	
2010	Face-Maker	Anzai Erina	NTV / YTV	Episode 3/File 3
2011	The Beautiful Neighbor	Ami Mashita	Fuji TV / KTV	
2012	Koisuru Maison: Rainbow Rose	Reika	TV Tokyo / Tooniverse	Second co-starring with Julien Kang
2012	Hungry!	Momoko	Fuji TV	Episode 8
2012	Somato Kabushiki Gaisha	Numata Shinobu	TBS	Disk 3
2012	Panda and Hedgehog	Mina	Channel A	Cameo (Episode 8 & 9)
2012	The King of Dramas	Akiko	SBS	
2012	Drama Special-Another Wedding	Minse Eun	KBS2	
2013	Ookaechizen		NHK BS Premium	2nd episode, "Reproved Shogun"
2013	Potato Star 2013QR3	Mina	tvN	Noh's neighbor
2014	The Story Of The Detective Boy Kindaichi, Neo	Giselle Tsukuyomi	NTV/YTV	Episode 8 & 9/File 8 & 9
2014	Yonimo Kimyona Monogatari: 2014 Fall Special	Masami	Fuji TV	
2015	Yami no Bansosha	Giselle Tsukuyomi	WOWOW	
2015	9 Seconds Eternal Love	Mi-na		
2015	Yonimo Kimyona Monogatari: 2015 Fall Special - Masterpiece revival		Fuji TV	
2016	Doctor Chousahan	Tabuchi Yuko	TV Tokyo	
2016	Cold Case: Shinjitsu no Tobira		WOWOW	
2016	Death Note: New Generation	Sho Nanase	Hulu	
2019	Doctor Detective	Seok Jin-i	SBS TV	
2019	Setsuyaku Rock	Makiko Oguro	NTV	
2021	Kotodamasou	Natsume Mitsuba	TV Asahi	Episode 7-10
2022	Chuzai Keiji	Reika Izumi	TV tokyo	Season 3

=== Film ===
Year	Title	Role	Notes	Ref
2006	Simsons	Miki Onaka		
2007	The Signs of Love	Asuka Miyamoto		
2008	Ame no Tsubasa	Toru Ikegami flower		
2008	10 Promises to My Dog	Cameo		
2010	All to the Sea	Yuka		
2010	Kyōfu	Kaori		
2010	Abacus and Sword	Sei Inoshiyama		
2013	The Werewolf Game: The Villagers Side	Marie Inoue		
2014	Monsterz	Oshikiri		
2014	Jossy's	Mika Aota		
2014	Bullet Train of Wives	Shima Tayo		
2015	Amor	Mysterious Girl	South Korean film	
2015	Seoul Searching	Mayumi	South Korean film	
2016	Death Note: Light Up the New World	Shō Nanase		
2016	My New Sassy Girl	Yuko	South Korean film	
2017	Where I Belong	Michi		
2018	Human, Space, Time and Human	Eve	South Korean film	
2021	The Nighthawk's First Love	Mew		
2022	Black Night Parade			

=== Stage ===
Year	Title	Director
1998	Shanpo-no-mori-de-nemuru	Yoshihiro Kurita
1999	Scrooge	Tudor Davis
2000	A Little Princess	Santa Tonakai
2001	Fadette	Yoshihiro Kurita
2002	Hanshin	Seisuke Yamazaki
2015	Peer Gynt	Akira Shirai

=== Variety ===
Year	Title	Network	Notes
2008	Jump!	CX	
2012	Trunq Daegu	Tokyo MX	with Song Joong-ki
2013	Strong Heart	SBS	Episode 163 & 164
2013	We Got Married Global	MBC	with Lee Hong-gi
2013	Quiz to Change the World	MBC	Episode 224
2014	Sebaki	MBC	
2014	Bankurawase	Fuji TV	
2014	The King Of Food	KBS	
2014	Hello! Stranger	MBC	
2015	Match Made in Heaven Returns	MBC	

=== Music videos ===
Year	Artist	Track	Notes
2007	Infinity 16	"Welcomez Minmi, 10-Feet (Manatsu no Orion 真夏のオリオン)"	
2008	Tohoshinki	"Why Did I Fall In Love With You"	with Murakami Koki
2009	Miho Fukuhara	"Yasashii Aka"	32 minute short film, with Tsutsui Mariko and Tanaka Yoji
2009	S.R.S	"Wonder Song"	
2011	Hiromi Sakimoto	"Yoake-no-Ballade"	
2011	Every Little Thing	"Moon"	with Jang Geun Suk
2012	Zia	"Because I'm Upset (속상해서)" (also known as "Depressed")	with Julien Kang
2013	Shinhwa	"This Love"	from The Classic album
2013	Heo Young Saeng	"Weak Child"	Special Album She
2013	Juju	"Mamotte Agetai"	
2015	Xiah Junsu	"Yesterday"	
2016	Raymond Lam	"Love is Near"	

== Awards and nominations ==
Year	Award	Category	Nominated work	Result
2016	Seoul International Drama Awards	Asian Star Prize	—N/a	Won
