= Ichiko (film) =

- Theatrical release poster
- Japanese: 市子
- Directed by: Akihiro Toda
- Written by: Naho Kamimura; Akihiro Toda
- Produced by: Nobuo Kameyama
- Starring: Hana Sugisaki; Ryuya Wakaba; Yūki Morinaga; Daichi Watanabe; Shōhei Uno; Yuri Nakamura
- Cinematography: Kosuke Haruki
- Edited by: Akihiro Toda
- Music by: Masamichi Shigeno
- Production companies: Basil; Cheesefilm Inc.
- Distributed by: Happinet Phantom Studios
- Release date: 8 December 2023 (Japan)
- Running time: 125 minutes
- Country: Japan
- Language: Japanese

Ichiko (Japanese: 市子) is a 2023 Japanese psychological thriller film written and directed by Akihiro Toda and starring Hana Sugisaki, Ryuya Wakaba, Yūki Morinaga, Daichi Watanabe, Shōhei Uno, Yuri Nakamura. It was released on 8 December 2023.

== Plot ==
Higashiōsaka. Natsumi Kawabe, a twice-divorced lone mother, worked at a bar and lived with her two little daughters in an apartment complex. The elder daughter, Ichiko, had no family register because Natsumi became pregnant with her new partner shortly after divorcing a violent husband, so she was unable to register the birth of the child due to the “300-day post-divorce issue“. Tsukiko, the younger daughter, had muscular dystrophy, a progressive muscular wasting disease. The social worker in charge of the case, Koizumi, having an affair with Natsumi, became a frequent guest in her apartment.

As Tsukiko's illness progressed, Natsumi and Ichiko were burdened with caring for her, including oxygen inhalation, suctioning of phlegm, and assistance with toileting. One hot summer day, while Natsumi was at work, Ichiko was tempted to stop the oxygen. Natsumi and Koizumi buried Tsukiko's body on Mt. Ikoma and decided to enroll Ichiko, who was now eight years old, in elementary school as Tsukiko. Koizumi, who had since lost his job and started drinking alcohol during the day, began sexually abusing Ichiko, who was now a high school student. When Ichiko accidentally killed Koizumi, her classmate Kita Hidekazu spied on her from the balcony. Kita had a crush on Ichiko. After dark, they took the body to a deserted railroad crossing and laid it down.

Ichiko ran away from home and became homeless. She met Kiki Yoshida and started working part-time as a live-in newspaper delivery girl. Yoshida, who aspired to become a pastry chef, invited Ichiko to open a cake shop with her in the future, which Ichiko made her “dream”. Several years later, Kita came looking for Ichiko while she was working at a cake shop, but Ichiko turned him away, telling him to forget about her. On the day of a summer festival, she met Yoshinori Hasegawa, who knew nothing about Ichiko, and they began to live together.

They lived together happily for three years. The day before the Yodogawa Fireworks Festival, Hasegawa gave Ichiko a yukata. He then took out the marriage certificate and proposed to her. Ichiko was delighted, shedding tears. The next day, the TV news reported the discovery of an unidentified, skeletonized body on Mt. Ikoma. When Ichiko was packing her bag to disappear from Hasegawa's presence, he returned. Ichiko left her bag behind and fled, taking shelter in Kita's apartment.

A few days after Hasegawa filed a missing persons report, a detective named Goto came to his apartment and told him that a woman named “Ichiko Kawabe” did not exist. Surprised, Hasegawa visited the newspaper store where Ichiko worked and Kiki Yoshida to retrace her steps. Goto told him that the skeletonized body found on Mt. Ikoma might be Tsukiko Kawabe. At the bottom of the bag Ichiko had left behind was a health insurance card and a family photo of Tsukiko Kawabe. On the back of the photo was an address in Minami, Tokushima. He visited there and he found Natsumi living under the alias of Michiko Yamaura.

Hasegawa heard all about Tsukiko from Natsumi. He returned to Higashiōsaka and visited Kita's apartment, which Goto had told him about. Ichiko was already gone and Kita could no longer contact her, Hasegawa was able to ask Kita about Tsukiko’s high school days and the Koizumi murder. “I love Ichiko. I want to help her.” Both Kita and Hasegawa felt the same way.

A young woman named Fuyuko Kitami came to Kita's apartment to ask for Ichiko. She had met Ichiko on a social media. ”She said you could help me to kill myself. I don't have parents, I've been out of work for a long time, and I don't have any friends,” she said, holding out her health insurance card. Kita understood Ichiko's idea and got shivers. Ichiko called him and said, “I'm at the beach“. Kita and Kitami drove to a seaside town, where Ichiko was waiting for them. The next day, a car was found at the bottom of the sea in Shirahama, Wakayama. Inside, two bodies of a man and a woman in their 20s were found.

== Cast ==
- Hana Sugisaki
- Ryuya Wakaba
- Yūki Morinaga
- Daichi Watanabe
- Shōhei Uno
- Yuri Nakamura

== Production ==
The film was announced in July 2023. The trailer of the film was released on 1 September 2023.

== Release ==
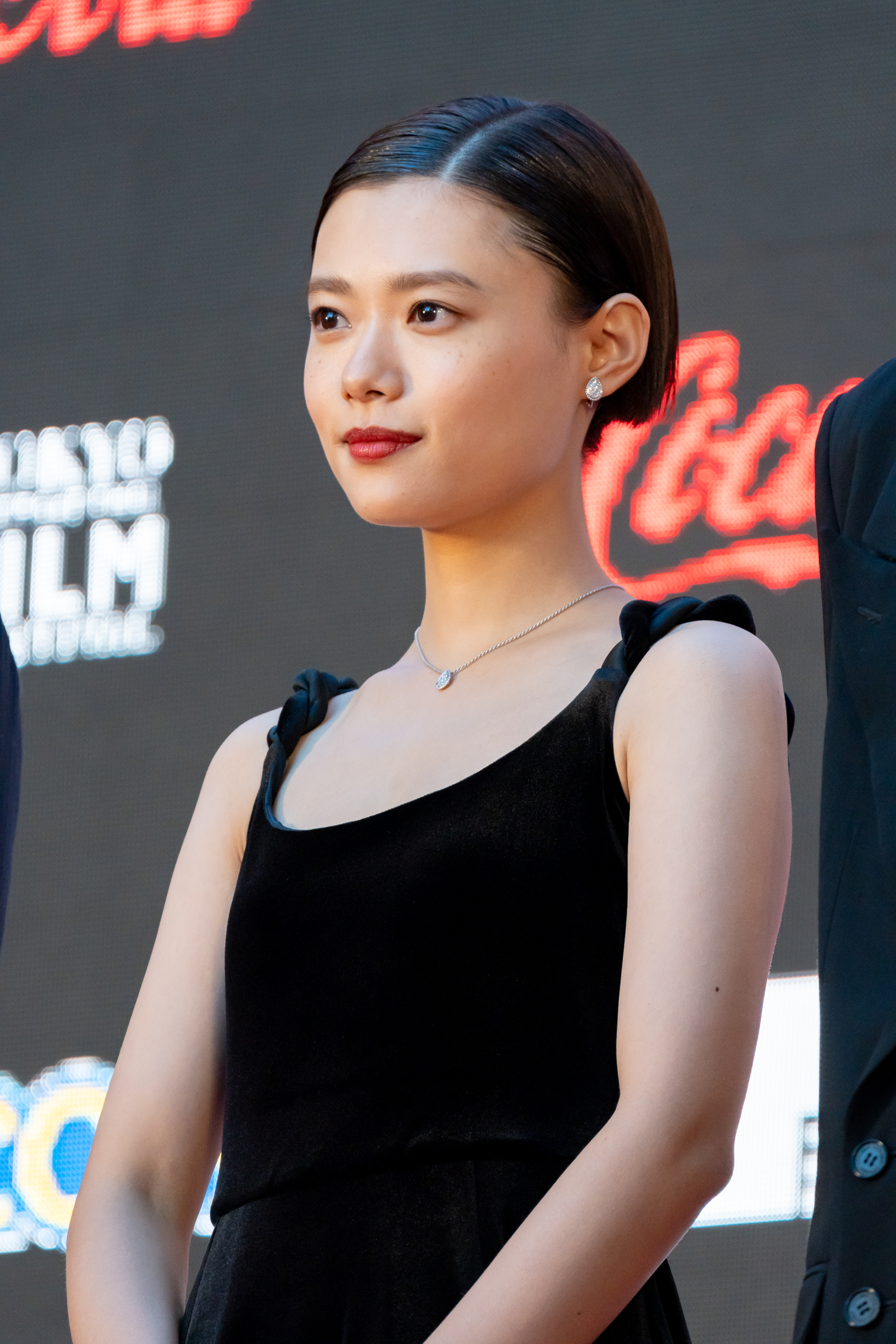
Hana Sugisaki at Red Carpet of the 36th Tokyo International Film Festival

The film was screened at the 28th Busan International Film Festival, 36th Tokyo International Film Festival, Gothenburg Film Festival, Far East Film Festival, Japanese Film Festival and New York Asian Film Festival.

=== Home media ===
The film premiered on Amazon Prime Video on 27 February 2024.

== Reception ==
Mark Schilling of The Japan Times rated the film 4 stars out of 5. Subhash K. Jha of Times Now reviewed the film.

=== Accolades ===
| Date | Award | Category | Recipients | Result | Ref. |
|---|---|---|---|---|---|
| 2024 | 78th Mainichi Film Awards | Best Actress | Hana Sugisaki | Won | |
| 2024 | 47th Japan Academy Film Prize | Best Actress | Hana Sugisaki | Nominated | |
| 2024 | 37th Takasaki Film Festival | Best Supporting Actor | Yuri Nakamura | Won | |
| 2024 | 37th Takasaki Film Festival | Best Supervisor Award | Akihiro Toda | Nominated | |
| 2025 | 46th Yokohama Film Festival | Best Actress | Hana Sugisaki | Won | |
