= Rio Sasaki =

Japanese actress

Rio Sasaki (佐々木 りお, Sasaki Rio; born March 25, 2002) is a Japanese child actress from Saitama Prefecture, Japan. She is a part of the Himawari Theatre Group.

== Filmography ==
=== Movies ===
- Goo Goo Datte Nekodearu (グーグーだって猫である) (2008)
- 20th Century Boys (20世紀少年) (2008)
- NonChan Noriben (のんちゃんのり弁) (2009)
- Fukemon (ふうけもん) (2009)
- Permanent Nobara (パーマネントのばら) (2010)
- Bushi do Sixteen (武士道シックスティーン) (2010)
- Kyōfu (恐怖) (2010)
- Rudolf and Ippaiattena (ルドルフとイッパイアッテナ) (2016)

=== TV dramas ===
- Otokomae! (オトコマエ!) (2008)
- Mei-chan no Shitsuji (メイちゃんの執事) (2009)
- Tokyo Shōjo (東京少女) (2009)
- Ryōmaden (龍馬伝) (2010)

=== Television commercials ===
- Dupont Japan
- Benesse
- Karaoke BanBan
- Yamato Transport

=== Video games ===
- Resident Evil 2 (2019) (Sherry Birkin)

=== Dubbing ===
==== Live-action ====
- Annie (Annie Bennett (Quvenzhané Wallis))
- Suicide Squad (Zoe (Shailyn Pierre-Dixon))
- Teenage Mutant Ninja Turtles (Young April O'Neil (Malina Weissman))
- Wonder Woman (12-year-old Diana (Emily Carey))

==== Animation ====
- Arthur Christmas (Gwen Hines)
- Frozen (Elsa, age 8)

=== Other ===
- Shōhin Korin (TV Tokyo)
