= 2009: Lost Memories =

- Hangul: 2009 로스트 메모리즈
- RR: 2009 roseuteu memorijeu
- MR: 2009 rosŭt'ŭ memorijŭ
- Directed by: Lee Si-myung
- Screenplay by: Lee Si-myung; Lee Sang-hak
- Story by: Bok Geo-il
- Produced by: Kim Yun-young; Seo Jun-won
- Starring: Jang Dong-gun; Toru Nakamura
- Cinematography: Park Hyeon-cheol
- Edited by: Kyung Min-ho
- Music by: Lee Dong-jun
- Production companies: Tube Entertainment; Indecom Cinema
- Distributed by: CJ Entertainment
- Release date: February 1, 2002
- Running time: 136 minutes
- Country: South Korea
- Languages: Korean; Japanese
- Box office: $12,049,825

2009: Lost Memories (Korean: 2009 로스트 메모리즈) is a 2002 South Korean science fiction action film directed by Lee Si-myung, adapted from the 1987 novel Looking for an Epitaph by Bok Geo-il. The film takes place in an alternate 2009, where the Korean Peninsula is still part of Imperial Japan due to a time-travel incident in 1909. It was distributed by CJ Entertainment and was released on February 1, 2002.

== Background ==
The film's opening sequence shows the following timeline, which is an alternate history from the events that actually occurred:

- 26 October, 1909: An Jung-geun's assassination attempt against Itō Hirobumi is thwarted by a man named Inoue.
- 1910: The Empire of Japan annexes Korea.
- 1 March, 1919: The March First Movement protests are suppressed with violence.
- 1921: Inoue, Itō's savior, becomes Chōsen's (Korea's) second governor-general.
- 1932: The assassination of Yoshinori Shirakawa by Yoon Bong-gil is prevented.
- 1936: The United States and the Empire of Japan enter World War II as allies against Nazi Germany.
- 1943: Japan annexes Manchukuo.
- 1945: Atomic bombs are dropped on Berlin instead of Hiroshima and Nagasaki, ending World War II.
- 1960: Japan becomes a permanent member of the U.N. Security Council.
- 1965: Japan launches its first satellite, Sakura 1 (presumably as part of the Space Race).
- 1988: The 1988 Summer Olympics are held in Nagoya (in contrast to the city losing to Seoul in the actual timeline)
- 2002: The 2002 FIFA World Cup is held in Japan (instead of both South Korea and Japan)

== Plot ==
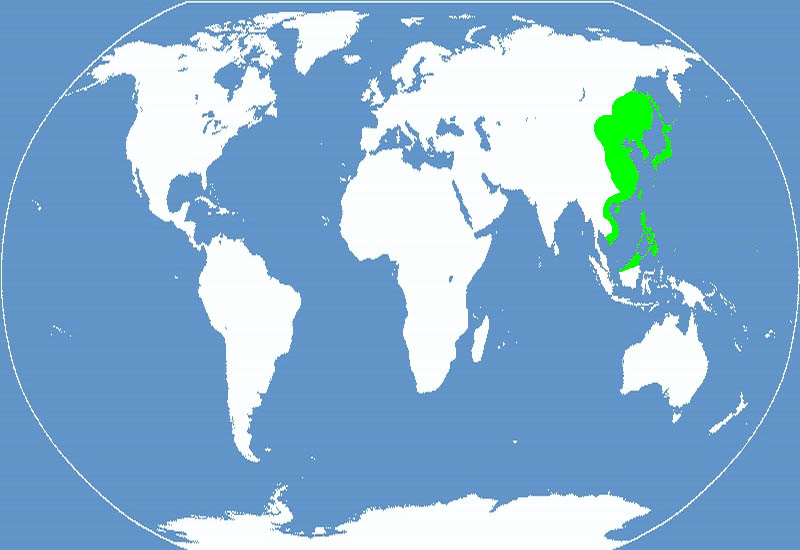
Imperial Japan world map according to the movie universe

It will soon be 100 years since Korea was incorporated into Japan. The Empire of Japan is the second most powerful country (after the United States) in the world and includes the Japanese Islands, the Korean Peninsula, Manchuria, Sakhalin, the entire east coast of China (including Beijing, Shanghai and Hong Kong), the Kuril Islands, Primorsky Krai, the southern part of Khabarovsk Krai, Amur Oblast, Jewish Autonomous Region, Vietnam, Philippines and the northern part of the island of Borneo in East Malaysia and Brunei. In the capital of Korea, Keijo (on the site of Seoul), in front of the palace of the Japanese governor-general stands a monument to Toyotomi Hideyoshi.

In 2009, the Korean Peninsula (Chosun) is still under Imperial Japanese rule and Japanese Bureau of Investigation (JBI) agents Masayuki Sakamoto and Shojiro Saigo thwart a hostage crisis at a museum in Keijo by a terrorist group known as the Hureisenjin. The exact motivation for the hostage situation is unknown, but during the investigation, Sakamoto discovers a museum artifact, a crescent-shaped rock known as the "Lunar Soul", found by one of the slain terrorists. After discovering that the Hureisenjin has a long history of targeting the Inoue Foundation, a group founded around the artifacts collected by the second Governor-General of Korea, Sakamoto begins to suspect the Hureisenjin were attempting to steal the Lunar Soul, although both he and Saigo are puzzled as to why a terrorist group would put so much effort into stealing historical artifacts. The Hureisenjin ambush the convoy shipping the foundation's artifacts back to Japan and take the Lunar Soul. The terrorists confront Sakamoto and Saigo in a gunfight, where Sakamoto encounters Oh Hye-rin, the organization's leader.

Sakamoto's questioning and accusations against the influential Inoue Foundation lead to him being thrown off the case, with the execution of Sakamoto's father as a traitor for aiding in a thwarted attack by the Hurisenjin on a cargo ship in Vladivostok in 1985 being cited by his suspicious superiors. Sakamoto pursues the investigation, traveling to Harbin to learn more about the Lunar Soul, and is then suspended from the JBI. That night, an unknown assailant murders Sakamoto's mentor, Takahashi, at his apartment and he is arrested for the crime. Sakamoto, however, escapes from the JBI with the help of Saigo, who vows to be his enemy the next time they meet.

A wounded Sakamoto stumbles into the Hureisenjin's hideout and Saigo is visited by the head of the Inoue Foundation, with both learning the truth: that they are living in an alternate timeline. In 2009, a large stone temple uncovered by a joint Chinese-Korean-Japanese archaeological expedition, is found to facilitate time travel, and through its exploitation by the Japanese right-wing nationalist group Uyoku dantai, a man named Inoue travels back in time exactly 100 years and prevents the assassination of Resident-General Itō Hirobumi on October 26, 1909. Itō's survival and Inoue's knowledge of future events allows for Japan, instead of being defeated with the other Axis Powers in World War II, to instead ally with the United States against Nazi Germany; The war ends in 1945, following the atomic bombing of Berlin (instead of Hiroshima and Nagasaki). As one of the victorious powers, Japan becomes a military and economic superpower with a permanent seat on the U.N. Security Council, with its colonial empire intact. Inoue goes on to become the second Governor-General of Korea and his descendants found the Inoue Foundation, which keeps knowledge of the altered timeline limited to only the highest levels of Japan's government. However, a Korean researcher who followed Inoue and attempted to stop him becomes the founder of Hureisenjin and passes along the story of the truth of the altered timeline, with the hope that the original timeline can somehow be restored.

Knowing about the altered history, Sakamoto allies with the Hureisenjin, who have located the temple stone and are planning their final attack. However, the JBI raid their hideout and kill almost everyone before being wiped out by an improvised explosive. Carrying the Lunar Soul with them, Sakamoto and Hye-rin escape to a tanker ship where the Inoue Foundation's artifacts are being held. They find the temple stone and place the Lunar Soul in it, which activates in the middle of a gunfight with the JBI. Hye-rin is killed, leaving Sakamoto as the only person left to fix the timeline. Sakamoto sends himself to Harbin in 1909, but is pursued by Saigo, who wants to retain the current timeline (Saigo is warned that if the original timeline is restored, his wife's family will almost certainly die in the atomic bombing of Hiroshima). Sakamoto wounds Saigo before heading to the railway station where the assassination is supposed to occur. He is about to stop Inoue from killing An, but Saigo once again confronts him. Sakamoto kills Inoue, then guns down Saigo to prevent him from shooting An; An then assassinates Itō, as in the original timeline. Later, Sakamoto is seen planting explosives to destroy the temple stone, when Hye-rin walks up to him. It then becomes clear that she was a Korean researcher in the original timeline, who had followed Inoue when he traveled back in time. Although this Hye-rin (as opposed to the Hye-rin in the alternate timeline) and Sakamoto have never met, they immediately form a special bond.

Back in 2009, it becomes clear that the original timeline has been restored, and at the Independence Hall of Korea, a young girl Sakamoto had met in the alternate timeline sees numerous pictures of Korean heroes and leaders, including one of Sakamoto and Hye-rin together smiling.

== Cast ==
- Jang Dong-gun as Masayuki Sakamoto, a JBI agent of Japanese and Korean descent
- Toru Nakamura as Shojiro Saigo, Sakamoto's partner
- Seo Jin-ho as Oh Hye-rin, the female leader of the Korean terrorist group Hureisenjin
- Miki Yoshimura as Yuriko Saigo, Shojiro's wife
- Shin Goo as Takahashi, Sakamoto's mentor
- Ken Mitsuishi as Hideyo, a JBI employee who wears large eyeglasses
- Shōhei Imamura as a historian
- Kim Min-sun as a kindergarten teacher who appears at the end of the film
- Masaaki Daimon
- Nobuyuki Katsube
- Lee Sa-pi
- Woo Sang-jeon

== Production ==
2009: Lost Memories was a co-production between Korea and Japan, coinciding with the 2002 FIFA World Cup, held jointly in Japan and South Korea.

Bok Geo-il, author of the source novel Bimyeong-eul Chajaseo ("Looking for an Epitaph") (1987), refused to be associated with the finished product, and successfully sued the film-makers to have his name removed from the credits.

== Reception ==
According to Tom Vick, who contributed a chapter on Korea to the book Asian Cinema, the theme of the film represents a desire in Korean cinema to "transcend time and memory" also reflected in other contemporary films such as Flower Island, Il Mare, and Bungee Jumping of Their Own.

Jonathan Clements in The Encyclopedia of Science Fiction wrote:

"After the irresistible opening sequence, it soon lapses into standard clichés – torn loyalties, doomed male bonding, fiery patriotism, and (as the Making Of sequence in the DVD brags) 20,000 rounds of small-arms ammunition."

Jeannette Catsoulis writing for The New York Times welcomed the film, saying that while the film is too long, the plot "leaps unexpectedly from action thriller to science-fiction drama without losing sight of the humanity beneath the nationalism."

Derek Elley writing for Variety concluded that the "billed as 'the biggest action flick in the history of Korean cinema,'" the movie is "a noirish action drama than a high-tech thriller. A wannabe Japanese-Korean buddy movie wrapped around a hokey, what-if/sci-fi drama, the movie is far too leisurely for the international market.".

== Analysis ==
Duy Lap Nguyen, in an article published in the Science Fiction Studies, described the work as "an allegory about the history of Korean national sovereignty" dealing with the topics such as Korean national identity and the Japanese-Korean relations.

== See also ==
- History of Korea
- Korean reunification
- List of Korean-language films
- Cinema of Korea
- Contemporary culture of South Korea
- Time travel
- Alternate history
