= Tōru Nakamura (actor) =

Japanese actor (born 1965)

Toru Nakamura
- 仲村 トオル
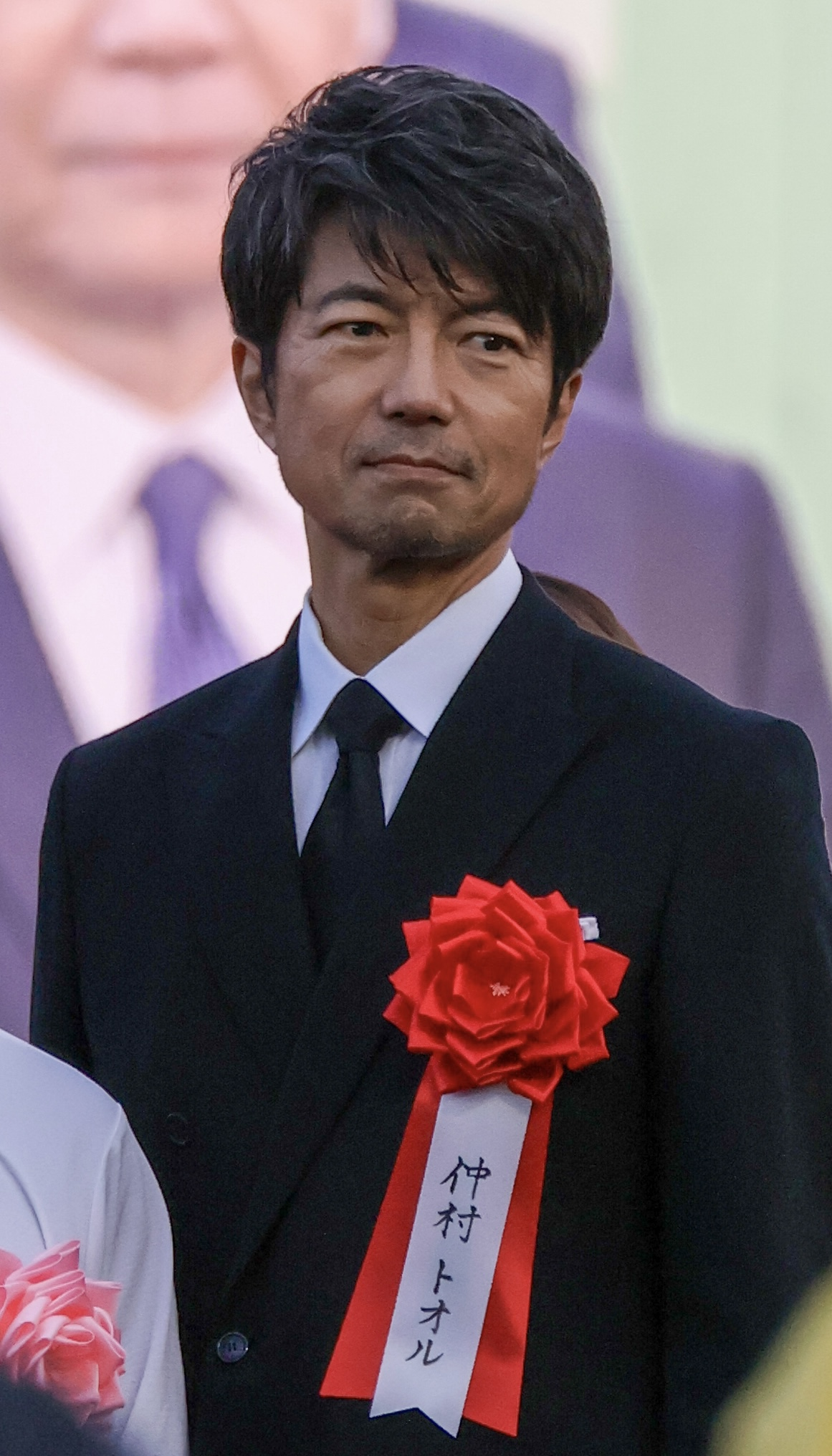
- Born: Tōru Nakamura (中村 亨, Nakamura Tōru); September 5, 1965 (age 61); Ota-ku, Tokyo, Japan
- Occupation: Actor
- Years active: 1985–present
- Spouse: Isako Washio
- Children: 1

Toru Nakamura (仲村 トオル, Nakamura Tōru; born September 5, 1965) is a Japanese actor. His real name is Tōru Nakamura (中村 亨, Nakamura Tōru).

== Career ==
Nakamura co-starred in Bok Geo-il's 2009: Lost Memories along with Jang Dong-gun and in Lou Ye's Purple Butterfly with Zhang Ziyi and Liu Ye.

He co-starred in Junji Sakamoto's 2010 film Strangers in the City with Manami Konishi.

== Filmography ==
=== Film ===
- Be-Bop High School (1985)
- Shinshi Domei (1986)
- Bee Bop High School: Koko Yotaro Elegy (1986)
- Bee Bop High School: Koko Yotaro Kyoso-kyoku (1987)
- Bee Bop High School: Koko Yotaro March (1987)
- Bee Bop High School: Koko Yotaro Kanketsu-hen (1988)
- Getting Blue in Color (1988)
- Bee Bop High School: Koko Yotaro Ondo (1988)
- Memories of You (1988)
- Roppongi Banana Boys (1989)
- The Passage to Japan (1991)
- New York Cop (1993)
- Blue Tiger (1994)
- Last Friends (1995)
- Gen-X Cops (1999)
- Tokyo Raiders (2000)
- Unloved (2001)
- 2009 Lost Memories (2002)
- Hana (2003)
- Purple Butterfly (2003)
- Sea Cat (2004)
- Blue Swallow (2005)
- Madamada Abunai Deka (2005)
- Limit of Love: Umizaru (2006)
- Thank You (2006)
- Waruboro (2007)
- Aozora no Roulette (2007)
- Tokyo Tower: Mom and Me, and Sometimes Dad (2007)
- Love Never to End (2007)
- The Kiss (2007)
- Nagai Nagai Satsujin (2008)
- K-20: Legend of the Mask (2008)
- Shaolin Girl (2008)
- Mt. Tsurugidake (2009)
- I Give My First Love to You (2009)
- It's on Me (2009)
- The Summit: A Chronicle of Stones to Serenity (2009)
- Oppai Volleyball (2009)
- Strangers in the City (2010)
- Saraba Itoshi no Daitoryo (2010)
- Kamifusen (2011)
- A Chorus of Angels (2012)
- Kerberos no Shouzou (2014)
- Dangerous Cops: Final 5 Days (2016), Tōru Machida
- Memoirs of a Murderer (2017), Sendō
- Love Mooning (2021), Takashi Takizawa
- Kumo to Saru no Kazoku (2023)
- Shin Kamen Rider (2023), Takeshi Hongo's father
- Dangerous Cops: Home Coming (2024), Tōru Machida
- Drawing Closer (2024), Kazuki Hayasaka
- Silence of the Sea (2024)
- Black Showman (2025), Eiichi Kamio
- When I Saw Your Sound (2027)
- All That Exists (2027), Yoichi Nakazawa
- Hara o Kukutte (2027)

=== Television ===
- Abunai Deka (1986)
- Kattenishiyagare Hey! Brother (1989)
- Nobunaga: King of Zipang (1992), Hashiba Hideyoshi
- Ryūkyū no Kaze (1993), Hashiba Hideyoshi
- Nemureru Mori (1998)
- Dear Tsugumi (2000)
- Ninjo Shigure Machi (2001)
- Kokoro Shoshu Hen (2003)
- Ashita Tenki ni Naare (2003)
- Destiny of Love (2004)
- Black Leather Notebook (2004)
- Umizaru (2005)
- Emergency Room 24 Hours 3 (2005)
- Animal Trail (2006)
- The Family (2007)
- Kaze no Hate (2007)
- 4 Lies (2008)
- Team Batista no Eikō (2008)
- The Flying Tire (2009)
- Tokyo Dogs (2009)
- General Rouge no Gaisen (2010)
- Ariadne no Dangan (2011)
- Suitei Yuzai (2012)
- Raden Meikyuu (2014)
- Kaiki Renai Sakusen (2015)
- Prefecture D(2016),Shinji Futawatari
- Two Homelands (2019), Taketora Matsui
- Nemesis (2021)
- Japan Sinks: People of Hope (2021), Eiichi Higashiyama
- Fermat's Cuisine (2023), Katsuhiro Shibuya
