= Monsterz =

- Theatrical release poster
- Directed by: Hideo Nakata
- Screenplay by: Yusuke Watanabe
- Based on: Haunters
- Produced by: Seiji Okuda
- Starring: Tatsuya Fujiwara; Takayuki Yamada; Satomi Ishihara
- Cinematography: Junichiro Hayashi
- Edited by: Naoko Aono
- Music by: Kenji Kawai
- Production companies: Nippon Television Network Corporation; Warner Bros. Japan; Horipro; Yomiuri Telecasting Corporation; VAP; D.N. Dream Partners; Twins Japan; JR East Planning; Sapporo Television Broadcasting; Miyagi Television Broadcasting; Shizuoka Daiichi Television; Chūkyō Television Broadcasting; Hiroshima Telecasting; Fukuoka Broadcasting Corporation
- Distributed by: Warner Bros. Pictures
- Release date: 30 May 2014 (Japan)
- Running time: 111 minutes
- Country: Japan
- Language: Japanese
- Box office: ¥697 million (Japan)

Monsterz is a 2014 Japanese fantasy horror thriller film directed by Hideo Nakata. It is a remake of the 2010 South Korean film Haunters.

== Cast ==
- Tatsuya Fujiwara
- Takayuki Yamada
- Satomi Ishihara
- Tae Kimura
- Yutaka Matsushige
- Mina Fujii

== Reception ==
The film has grossed ¥697 million in Japan.

In Film Business Asia, Derek Elley gave the film a rating of 3 out of 10, calling it a "feeble Japanese remake" with "no atmosphere". The Guardian was more positive, listing it as one of the best Japanese horror films.
