= Chameleon (2008 Japanese film) =

- Theatrical release poster
- Directed by: Junji Sakamoto
- Written by: Shoichi Maruyama
- Produced by: Mitsuru Kurosawa
- Starring: Tatsuya Fujiwara; Asami Mizukawa; Shun Shioya; Kazuki Namioka; Koichiro Nishi
- Cinematography: Norimichi Kasamatsu
- Edited by: Shinichi Fushima
- Music by: Goro Yasukawa
- Production companies: Central Arts; Toei Video Company; VAP; TV Tokyo; Epic Records Japan; Toei Agency; Ark Entertainment
- Distributed by: Toei Company
- Release date: 5 July 2008 (Japan)
- Running time: 97 minutes
- Country: Japan
- Language: Japanese

Chameleon (Japanese: カメレオン) is a 2008 Japanese crime action film directed by Junji Sakamoto and starring Tatsuya Fujiwara. It was released in Japan on 5 July 2008. It was screened in the Midnight Passion section at the 13th Busan International Film Festival. Fujiwara won the Best Actor award at the 18th Japan Film Professional Awards.

== Plot ==
Goro is a con man based in Tokyo. He works with his friends Kosuke, Jun, and Tatsuo. In a parking lot, they see a kidnapping of a man, which Goro records with his mobile phone camera. When they watch television news in their hideout, they find out that the kidnapped man is a witness to a bribe scandal of a politician Atsugi.

Goro meets a fortune-teller Keiko. Keiko tells him that she is a victim of marriage fraud and has no money. Goro takes her to his hideout and they start to live together.

Kosuke, Jun, and Tatsuo are killed by Risk Cover Agency's agents. A police officer Kajiwara tells Goro that RCA is working for Atsugi to cover up his bribe scandal.

Goro and Keiko go to a port town. Goro recommends Keiko to break up with him, but she refuses to do so. When they hug and kiss, they are shot by a sniper. Keiko is kidnapped by RCA.

With a gun in his hand, Goro raids on RCA's headquarters and kills the agents one after another. However, the agency's leader Kijima is not there. Goro finds a body that is covered with sheets, laying on a bed.

Goro sneaks into a national assembly and hands out a photograph that captures Kijima kidnapping a witness. Kijima grabs Goro's left arm. It is revealed that Goro's left arm is artificial. Goro tells Kijima that he will wait outside.

Side by side, Goro and Keiko walk in a crowded city.

== Cast ==
- Tatsuya Fujiwara as Goro Noda
- Asami Mizukawa as Keiko Koike
- Shun Shioya as Kosuke Harukawa
- Kazuki Namioka as Jun Yoshida
- Koichiro Nishi as Tatsuo Okita
- Tasuku Emoto
- Kōsuke Toyohara as Taka Kijima
- Shun Sugata
- Masato Hagiwara as Satoru Kajiwara
- Sei Hiraizumi
- Hiroshi Inuzuka as Shuji Yamamura
- Kei Tani as Kenzo Sakai
- Haruko Kato as Noriko Yamamura
- Ittoku Kishibe as Yoshitake Atsugi

== Release ==
The film was released in Japan on 5 July 2008. It was screened in the Midnight Passion section at the 13th Busan International Film Festival.

== Reception ==
Maggie Lee of The Hollywood Reporter stated that "despite some hard-hitting combat and kinetic car chases, Chameleon ends up feeling like a makeover of 1980s TV action." She added: "The film is unsure of its own footing in handling this multi-genre item and fails to provide enough political insight or adventurousness." Russel Edwards of Variety called the film "entertaining if overall low-key".

Tatsuya Fujiwara won the Best Actor award at the 18th Japan Film Professional Awards.
