= Kangnam (singer) =

South Korean Japanese singer (born 1987)

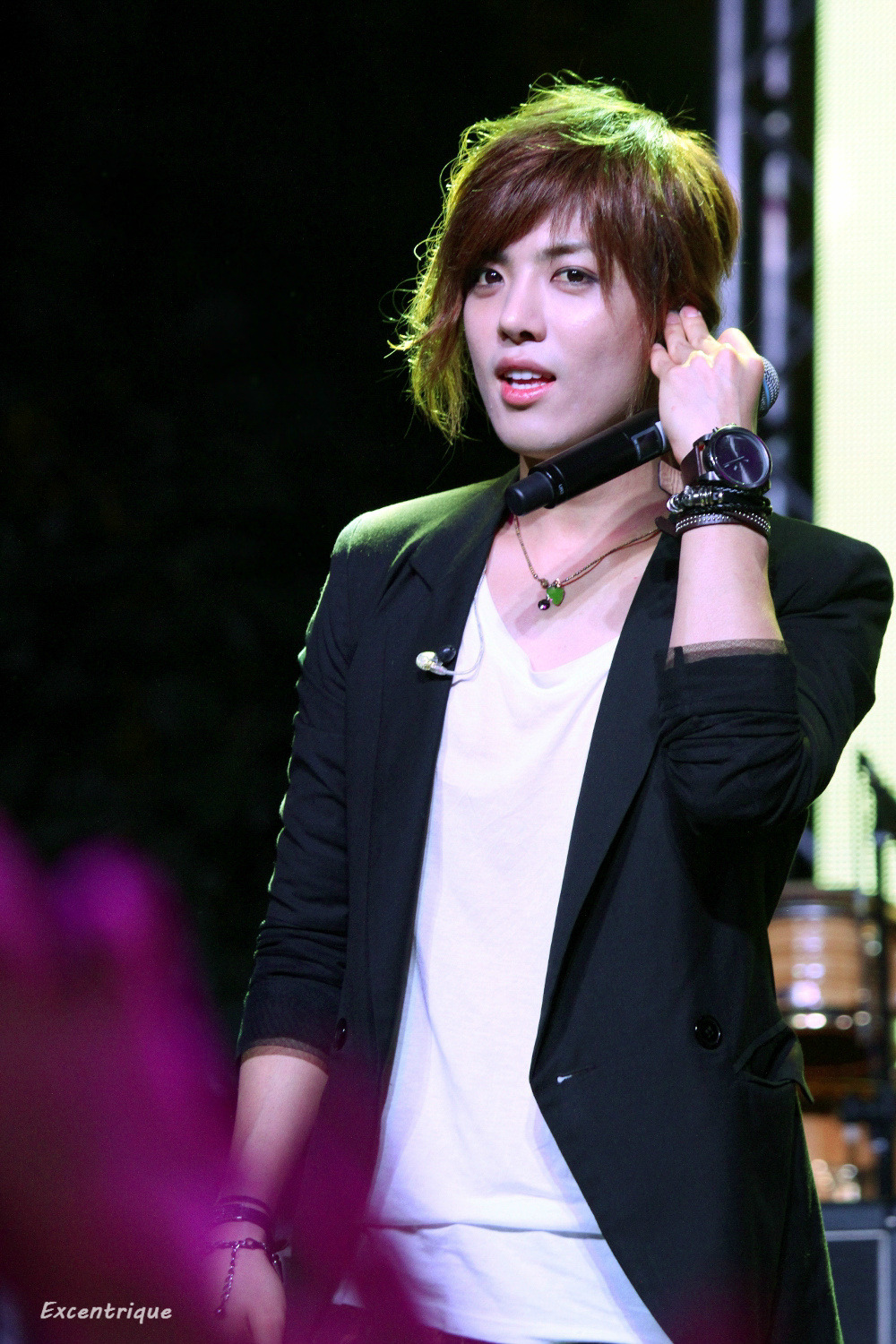
- Kangnam in 2013

Background information
- Born: Yasuo Namekawa (滑川康男); 23 March 1987 (age 39); Tokyo, Japan
- Genres: Hip hop; K-pop; trot
- Occupations: Singer; television personality; Actor; Youtuber
- Instruments: Vocals; guitar; piano; violin
- Years active: 2008–present
- Label: ARMADA Entertainment
- Formerly of: M.I.B
- Spouse: Lee Sang-hwa (m. 2019)

Yasuo Namekawa (滑川康男, Namekawa Yasuo; born 23 March 1987), better known by his stage name Kangnam, is a South Korean-Japanese singer, YouTuber, and television personality who was the vocalist and oldest member of the South Korean hip-hop group M.I.B. He made his first recording in South Korea with the single "Say My Name" just before becoming a member of M.I.B.

== Biography ==
=== Early life and career beginnings (1987–2010) ===
Kangnam was born on 23 March 1987 in Tokyo, Japan, to a Korean mother and a Japanese father. As an only child, he spent most of his childhood in Japan and also spent some years in Hawaii. In March 2008, Kangnam appeared under the stage name Ya-Cha as a member of the Japanese band Kick Chop Busters. However, he left the band in 2010 for reasons he has never disclosed. Kangnam has stated in interviews that his family is wealthy, but that they do not support him financially.

=== School life ===
Kangnam attended the Hawaiian Mission Academy in Honolulu for a brief period before transferring to another high school. He transferred to five different schools before returning to Japan to finish his studies. Kangnam briefly attended Temple University in Philadelphia, Pennsylvania, where he majored in communications, but left the school to pursue music instead.

=== Career in South Korea (2011–present) ===
In South Korea, Kangnam first performed as a member of M.I.B under the Jungle Entertainment label on 25 October 2011, with the title track "G.D.M", which stands for "Girls, Dreams, Money". His solo song, "Say My Name", was released on 17 October 2011, as part of a spin-off promotion to prove that each member was capable of standing alone. Kangnam is an accomplished guitarist and pianist.

In 2012, Kangnam appeared in a TV advertisement for Epson, an electronics company that specializes in image-related products, and took on his first acting role in the TV sitcom 21st Century Family, and he became the host of the Japanese version of Mnet's Jjang.

In October 2014, he became a permanent cast member of MBC's I Live Alone. In November 2014, he became an exclusive model for the shoe store ABC Mart, with model Nam Joo-hyuk.

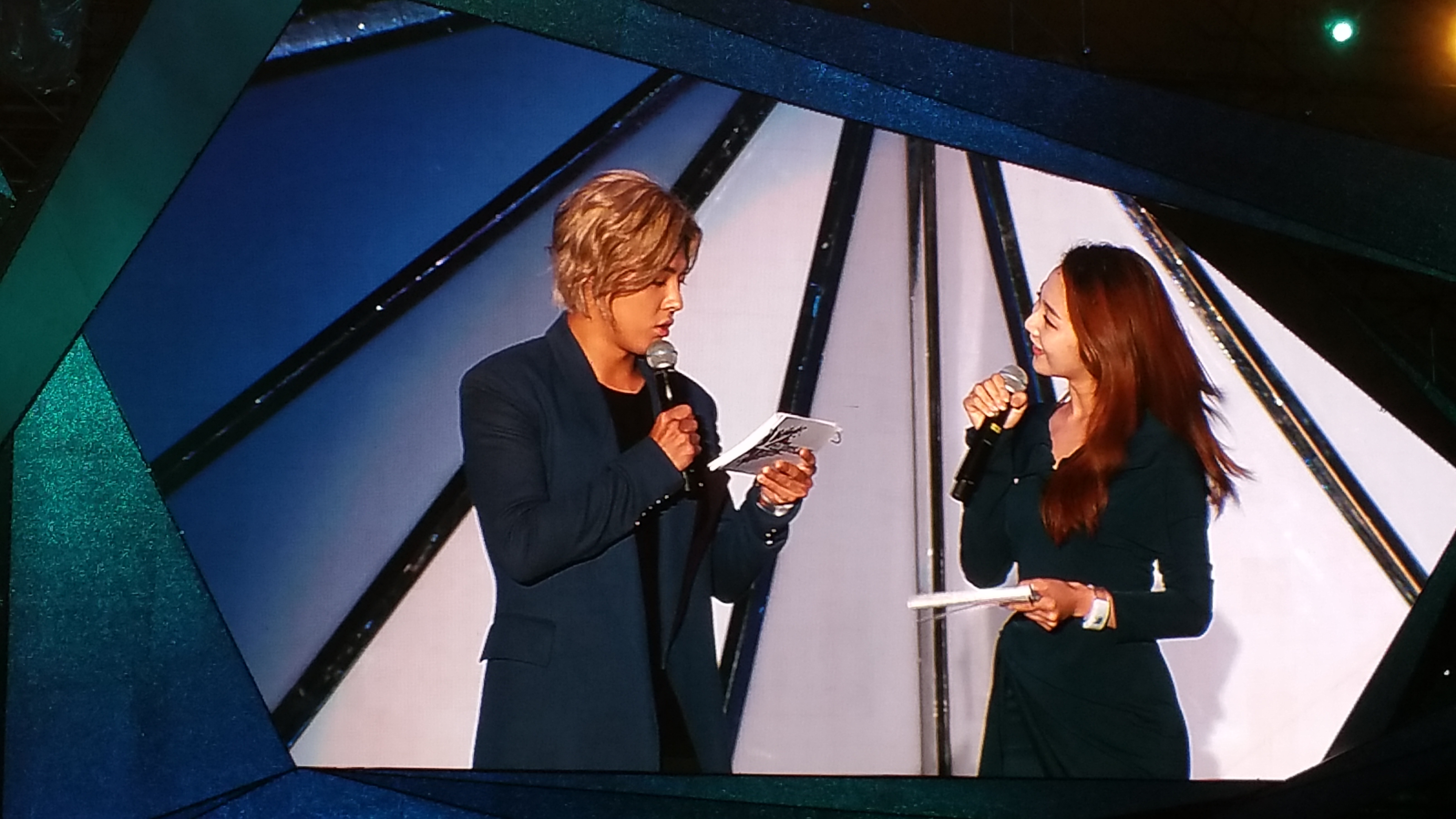
Kangnam as one of the MCs of KCON JEJU 2015

During the end of 2014, he was the presenter for a year-end festival stage as part of the "Lucky Boys" project for 2014 SBS Gayo Daejun. On the 26 December episode of MBC's I Live Alone, Kangnam spoke about attending year-end festivals for the first time in his career: "Singers usually appear on TV to sing at the end of each year. Every year, I have been watching TV thinking 'I'll do that next year,' and somehow four years have passed."

On 26 December 2014, Kangnam released his second solo track, "What Do I Do", which went to #1 on Daum's real-time charts. Kangnam also ranked #1 on several real-time searches, including Naver, Melon and Mnet.

In February 2015, he was appointed the honorary ambassador for the fourth KCON music festival and convention when it was held for the first time in Japan. He also performed at the concert held as part of the convention on 22 April. He has said that his fluency in both languages would allow him to "act as the bridge between the exchange of culture from both countries".

On September 2, 2016, he was selected as a cast member for Law of the Jungle in Mongolia. His performance led to him being hired as a permanent cast member, and he continued to participate in the "Law of the Jungle" in locations as varied as Fiji, Indonesia, Malaysia, New Zealand, Mexico, States of Micronesia, Papua New Guinea, Timor Leste, Cook Island, Sri Lanka, Maldives, and Korea.

On September 15, 2021, Kangham launched the YouTube channel, Neighborhood Friend Kang Nami. Kangnam promised he would not show his wife Lee Sang-hwa’s face until the channel reached 800,000 subscribers; her first appearance was on July 31, 2024.

=== Solo career in Japan (2016) ===
Kangnam released his first Japanese solo album, Ready to Fly, on 25 May 2016, under CJ Victor Entertainment.

== Personal life ==
On 16 March 2019, Kangnam's agency confirmed that he and the Olympic speed skater Lee Sang-hwa were dating. They got to know each other after appearing on the SBS variety show Law of the Jungle ("in Last Indian Ocean" part). On 11 August 2019, Kangnam announced his decision to forfeit his Japanese citizenship and began the process of becoming a naturalized Korean citizen. Kangnam married Lee on 12 October 2019.

Kangnam officially became a South Korean citizen in February 2022. His official Korean name is Kwon Kang Nam.

== Philanthropy ==
On January 2, 2023, Kangnam donated 10 million won to a stray dog shelter, Korea Animal Rights Advocates (K.A.R.A).

== Discography ==
For Kangnam's work with M.I.B, see M.I.B's discography.

=== Studio albums ===
Title	Album details	Peak chart positions	Sales
Title	Album details	KOR	Sales
Just Do Well Yourself (댁이나 잘하세요)	Released: 16 June 2018; Label: JA Entertainment; Formats: CD, digital download	—	—N/a

=== Extended plays ===
Title	Album details	Peak chart positions	Sales
Title	Album details	KOR	Sales
Chocolate	Released: 10 September 2015; Label: Jungle Entertainment; Formats: CD, digital download	16	KOR: 1,349

=== Singles ===
Title	Year	Peak chart positions		Sales	Album
Title	Year	KOR	JPN	Sales	Album
Korean
"Say My Name"	2011	—	—	—N/a	Non-album single
"What Do I Do" (어떡하죠)	2014	56	—	KOR: 45,097	Chocolate
"My Type" (전통시장) with Jessi, Cheetah	2015	2	—	KOR: 778,193	Unpretty Rapstar Compilation
"Chocolate" feat. San E	2015	—	—	—N/a	Chocolate
"Traditional Market" (전통시장) with Tae Jin-ah	2015	—	—	—N/a	Jin Jin Ja Rah
"Human Destiny" (사람팔자) with Tae Jin-ah	2016	—	—	—N/a	Non-album singles
"Jangjigijang" (장지기장) with Tae Jin-ah	2018	—	—	—N/a	Non-album singles
"Just Do Well Yourself" (댁이나 잘하세요)	2018	—	—	—N/a	Just Do Well Yourself
Japanese
"Ready to Fly"	2016	—	80	—N/a	Non-album single
"—" denotes song did not chart or was not released in that region.

== Filmography ==
=== Television series ===
Year	Show	Role	Notes
2013	I Can Hear Your Voice	Thief	Cameo (episode 17)
2014	Pinocchio	Song Cha-ok's student	Cameo (episode 20)

=== Web series ===
Year	Title	Role	Ref.
2021	The Magic	Ssong Ssong	

=== Television show ===
Year	Title	Notes
2012	W. Military Academy	Main cast
2012	21st-Century Family	Host
2014	Inside Story Salon	Main cast
2014	Hello! Stranger	Regular cast
2014	Animals	Main cast
2014–2015	Off to School	Regular cast
2015–2021	Law of the Jungle	Cast member (Editions in Yap, Papua New Guinea, Mongolia, East Timor, Kota Manado, Sumatra, Wild New Zealand, Komodo, Cook Islands, Mexico, Sabah, Indian Ocean)
2015	Invisible Man	Main cast
2015	King of Mask Singer	Episode 37 (with the stage name "Musical Prodigy Conductor Mozart")
2016	Cool Kiz On The Block	Cast member (Episodes 146–149 & 151–163, 166–167)
2017	Elementary School Teacher	Main cast
2017	Thinking About My Bias	Cast member
2017	Battle Trip	Contestant with Lee Tae-gon (Episodes 65–67)
2018	태어나서 처음으로	Main cast
2018	King of Mask Singer	Episode 159-160 (Dragon Fruit)
2019	Same Bed, Different Dreams 2: You Are My Destiny	Cast member
2020	Law of the Jungle – Tribe Chief and Granny	Episode 427–429; Cast member
2022	IT Live from Today	Host
2023	Miss Wife	Panelist; MBC Lunar New Year
2023	Fantastic Family - DNA Singer	Contestant with his mother, Kwon Myung Sook

=== Web shows ===
Year	Title	Role	Ref.
2022	No Ki Deuk Zone	Cast Member	

== Awards and nominations ==
Year	Award	Category	Nominated work	Result
2014	MBC Entertainment Awards	New Star of the Year	I Live Alone	Won
2016	SBS Entertainment Awards	Rookie Award, Male	Law of the Jungle	Won
2019	2019 SBS Entertainment Awards	SNS Star Award	Same Bed, Different Dreams 2: You Are My Destiny	Won
