= Rudolf the Black Cat =

2016 film by Kunihiko Yuyama

- Theatrical release poster

Japanese name
- Kanji: ルドルフとイッパイアッテナ
Transcriptions
- Revised Hepburn: Rudorufu to Ippaiattena
- Directed by: Kunihiko Yuyama; Motonori Sakakibara
- Written by: Yōichi Katō
- Based on: Rudolph and Ippaiattena and Rudorufu Tomodachi Hitoridachi by Hiroshi Saitō; Hanmo Sugiura
- Produced by: Yoshio Nakayama; Minami Ichikawa; Nobuiku Suzuki; Toshiaki Okuno; Yoshitaka Toge; Keiichi Sawa; Masaya Yabushita; Kiyoshi Nagai; Mika Nakamura; Yoshitaka Hori; Yoshikazu Kumagai; Eisaku Yoshikawa; Ken Sakamoto; Daisuke Kadoya (Executive Producer)
- Starring: Mao Inoue; Ryohei Suzuki; Akio Ōtsuka; Nana Mizuki; Yuka Terasaki; Rio Sasaki; Norito Yashima; Arata Furuta; Sandayū Dokumamushi
- Music by: Naoki Satō
- Production companies: Sprite Animation Studios; OLM; OLM Digital
- Distributed by: Toho
- Release date: August 6, 2016
- Running time: 90 minutes
- Country: Japan
- Language: Japanese
- Box office: US$12.0 million

Rudolf the Black Cat (Japanese: ルドルフとイッパイアッテナ, Hepburn: Rudorufu to Ippaiattena) is a 2016 Japanese animated family adventure drama film directed by Kunihiko Yuyama and Motonori Sakakibara. It was released in Japan by Toho on August 6, 2016.

== Plot ==
Rudolf, a black cat that lives in the Japanese town of Gifu never left his home, being cared for by the little girl Rie, his owner. When Rie's mother asks her to take food to his grandmother, Rudolf follows Rie out of the house. Rudolf eventually runs afoul of a fishmonger, runs away, gets inside a truck, and is knocked out by a broom the fishmonger threw. When Rudolf wakes up and gets out from the truck, he meets "Gottalot", a large bengal cat who lets Rudolf sleep under a temple. The next morning, the two traverse the town until Rudolf asks if Gottalot was a pet cat. Gottalot leaves in a huff. Rudolf then encounters Buchi, a calico Oriental Shorthair, with a habit of imitating martial arts moves, who says that Gottalot was known as the Junk Tiger. Buchi also mentions Devil, a aggressive white bulldog that lives in an animal pound. While offering to let Rudolf hang around his house, Buchi explains Gottalot's fight against a Dobermann, who threatens to tear his ear off if he returns. Buchi cuts the story short when he sees a Siamese cat and goes after her.

Later, after learning that Rudolf knows about his past, Gottalot explains that next to Devil's house is where his owner used to live until he went to the United States, leaving him. Ever since Gottalot became a stray, Devil looked down on him. After meeting up with Buchi, Gottalot and Rudolf infiltrate the school and enter a classroom, where Rudolf and Buchi become intrigued with the books. Gottalot and Buchi encourage Rudolf to learn to read and write. Days go by as Rudolf learn to read, and write. One day, Rudolf sees Gifu on a television screen. Despite knowing that Gifu is over a hundred miles away, Rudolf decides to find a way to get home, by going into a truck heading for Gifu. However, what he enters is a freezer truck. Gottalot and Buchi chase after the truck and retrieve Rudolf (frozen in a small block of ice) and free him.

Autumn comes, and when a poster about a tour bus to Gifu, Rudolf and Gottalot ask Buchi, who becomes enticed to Misha, a cowardly Scottish Fold who mentions that the bus will come at November 10 on 6:30 AM. Later in the day, Gottalot is injured by Devil. So, Rudolf tells Buchi to watch over Gottalot as he alerts the schoolteacher and leads him to Gottalot, the teacher brings the injured Gottalot to a doctor for medical attention. The schoolteacher eventually tells the cats that Gottalot will stay with him as he will need to rest for two weeks. In the Schoolteacher's house, Gottalot apologizes for making Rudolf worry, as Rudolf thanks him for watching over him as he says goodbye. Rudolf then faces Devil in a fight and despite Devil having the home advantage, Rudolf defeats Devil. But since Devil can't swim, he asks for help. Rudolf and Buchi then make him swear that he won't bully any cat ever again, to which Devil agrees to. Rudolf returns to Gottalot, who says that the tour bus left, so he won't be going back to Gifu. as the month's pass, Gottalot is fully recovered but isn't coming outside much. At spring, Buchi and Misha are dating, and Devil calmed down after their fight and explained that before Gottalot's owner moved away, Gottalot and Devil were good friends, but they broke off when Gottalot became a stray. Devil then has Rudolf give his food to Gottalot as a token of his apology. Later, Gottalot then helps Rudolf learn about the license plates of cars, signifying where they come from, along with Chinese text. One night, Gottalot explains that he'll be going to the United States, shocking everyone, since Gottalot's owner isn't going to return to his house as it is being remodeled.

The next day, Rudolf says goodbye to Gottalot, Buchi, and Misha as the Truck he is currently aboard goes to different prefectures, by going from one truck to the next. but despite one of the trucks getting a flat tire, he manages to get home, but, when he enters the house, to his surprise, he discovers another black kitten who happens to be Rudolf's younger brother, who lived in the house a year after Rudolf was gone. knowing that the family can't have more than one cat, Rudolf leaves and returns to Tokyo. upon returning to Tokyo, Rudolf sees Buchi and Misha and says that he decided to stay in Tokyo. Then he sees Gottalot, who said that he was going, but his former owner returned who made a lot of money in America after selling his business. Later at night, Gottalot, Buchi, Misha, and Rudolf (who is renamed Crow) along with a few stray cats eat dinner. They also learn that Devil can swim. As the other cats enjoy themselves, Gottalot and Crow look at the night sky looking forward to the future.

== Cast ==
Character	Japanese voice actor
Rudolf	Mao Inoue
Gottalot	Ryohei Suzuki
Master Kuma	Akio Ōtsuka
Devil	Arata Furuta
Buchi	Norito Yashima
Misha	Nana Mizuki
Rie	Rio Sasaki
Truck Driver	Sandayū Dokumamushi
Rudolf's younger brother	Yuka Terasaki

== Reception ==
Rudolf the Black Cat opened in fifth place during its theatrical opening weekend in Japan, with 147,179 admissions and a gross of ¥187.3 million. By its second weekend it had grossed US$6.6 million and by its third weekend, US$10.2 million.
