= To Each His Own (2017 film) =

- Directed by: Izuru Narushima
- Produced by: Morio Amagi
- Starring: Sôta Fukushi; Shin'ya Hamada; Narushi Ikeda
- Release date: 27 May 2017
- Country: Japan
- Language: Japanese

To Each His Own (Japanese: ちょっと今から仕事やめてくる, Hepburn: Chotto Imakara Shigoto Yametekuru) is a Japanese drama film, released in 2017. It was directed by Izuru Narushima with a screenplay by Emi Kitagawa, Izuru Narushima, Kumi Tawada, and Hiroyuki Ikeda. It is based on the novel by Emi Kitagawa "Chotto Ima Kara Shigoto Yamete Kuru" published in 2015, the novel was the Winner of the "Media Works Bunko Prize": 21st Dengeki Novel Prize.

== Plot ==
A young Japanese salaryman, Takashi is suffering abuse and difficulty in a high pressured sales position. Eventually succumbing to the stress, he tries to end his own life by throwing himself on to the railway tracks. At the last minute, he is saved by an old friend from school, Yamamoto. He befriends the man, who has a carefree, happy life, however as he grows to know him he realises all is not what it seems. Yamamoto ends up not being his old friend, through a case of mistaken identity. Takashi's work life gets worse, and he becomes distant from his parents as he takes his stress out on them. His only friend at work is Miki. He manages, though a change in attitude to get a major account, but the loses it because of a mistake in an order form that he is sure he didn't make. Finally he decides to quit his job, as he learns from Yamamoto there is more to life, and he reconciles with his parents. Miki apologises to him, and he learns she had sabotaged his efforts to get new major account, as she was under extreme pressure, and him getting it would have meant more work for her.

In the end he finds out that Yamamoto has befriended him because his twin brother was also a salaryman who had committed suicide. After leaving his job, he travels to Vanuatu where Yamamoto works on an orphanage.

== Cast ==
- Sôta Fukushi as Yamamoto
- Asuka Kodo as Takashi Aoyama
- Yôko Moriguchi as Yoko Aoyama
- Haru Kuroki as Miki Igarashi
- Kôtarô Yoshida as Mamoru Yamagami
- Eiko Koike as Reiko Oba
