= Joshi Zu =

Jossy's
- Directed by: Yūichi Fukuda
- Screenplay by: Yūichi Fukuda
- Produced by: Hirobumi Shigemura
- Starring: Mirei Kiritani; Mina Fujii; Mitsuki Takahata; Kasumi Arimura; Mizuki Yamamoto
- Edited by: Jun Kuriyagawa
- Music by: Eishi Segawa
- Distributed by: King Records
- Release date: June 7, 2014 (Japan)
- Running time: 97 minutes
- Country: Japan
- Language: Japanese

Jossy's (女子ーズ) is a 2014 Japanese tokusatsu comedy film directed by Yūichi Fukuda. It was released on 7 June 2014.

== Cast ==
- Mirei Kiritani as Naoko Akagi/Jossy Red
- Mina Fujii as Mika Aota/Jossy Blue
- Mitsuki Takahata as Yuri Kikawada/Jossy Yellow
- Kasumi Arimura as Kanoko Midoriyama/Jossy Green
- Mizuki Yamamoto as Sumire Konno/Jossy Navy
