= Samy Rashad =

Egyptian television personality

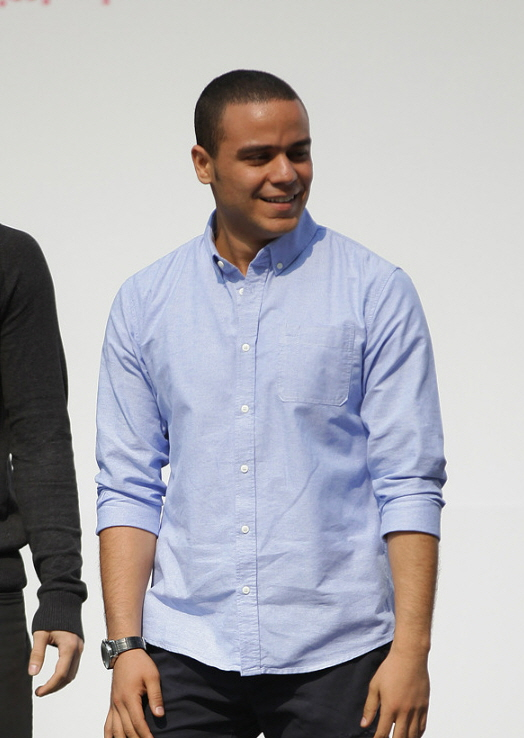
- Born: April 25, 1990 (age 35); Mansoura, Egypt
- Occupation: Television personality
- Website: Samy Rashad on Instagram

Samy Mohamed Rashad Mahmoud Ahmed Kandil El-Baz (born April 25, 1990) is an Egyptian who lives and performs in South Korea as a television personality. He was a cast member in the talk show Non-Summit. And also he was cast member in the variety show Hello! Stranger.

== Filmography ==
=== Television series ===
Year	Title	Role	Network	Notes
2014–present	Non-Summit	Himself	JTBC	cast member
2014–2015	Hello! Stranger	Himself	MBC	cast member
