= Akiko Ashizawa =

Japanese camera operator

- Born: 1951 (age 74–75)
- Occupation: Photographer

Akiko Ashizawa (芦澤明子, Ashizawa Akiko; born 1951 in Tokyo) is a Japanese cinematographer and photographer.

== Career ==
Starting in 8mm film and pink film, Ashizawa eventually became an assistant to the cinematographers Hideo Itō and Takayo Oshikiri. She turned independent in 1982 and has photographed the films of directors such as Kiyoshi Kurosawa, Kunitoshi Manda, and Shō Igarashi, in addition to doing the camera for TV commercials and documentaries. She has also published several collections of her photographs.

== Awards ==
In 2012, she won the award for best cinematography for Chronicle of My Mother at the Mainichi Film Awards. In 2018, she was awarded the Medal with Purple Ribbon by the Japanese government.

== Filmography ==
- Playing with Good Children (1994)
- Naked Blood (1996)
- Unloved (2001)
- Loft (2005)
- Retribution (2006)
- Tokyo Sonata (2008)
- Kyōfu (2010)
- Chronicle of My Mother (2011)
- Real (2013)
- Tamako in Moratorium (2013)
- Journey to the Shore (2015)
- Sayonara (2015)
- Creepy (2016)
- Before We Vanish (2017)
- To the Ends of the Earth (2019)
- Vengeance Is Mine, All Others Pay Cash (2021)
- Sleep No More (2026)
