= Hairi Katagiri =

Japanese actress (born 1963)

- 片桐 はいり
- Born: Yumi Katagiri; January 18, 1963 (age 63); Ōta, Tokyo, Japan
- Education: Ōta-ku San-nō Shōgakkō; Kōran Jogakkō Chūtō-ka Kōtō-ka; Seikei University Faculty of Letters Department of Japanese Literature
- Occupation: Actress
- Years active: 1982 - present
- Agent: Stardust Promotion
- Awards: 82nd Kinema Junpo Best Ten Reader's Choice Award (Mogiri yo Konya mo Arigatou)

Yumi Katagiri (片桐 由美, Katagiri Yumi; born January 18, 1963, in Ōta, Tokyo, Japan), better known as Hairi Katagiri (片桐 はいり, Katagiri Hairi), is a Japanese actress represented by Stardust Promotion.

== Filmography ==
=== TV series ===
Year	Title	Role	Notes	Ref.
2015	Ōsugi Tantei Jimusho	Yuri Shiraishi		
2022	Chimudondon	Kyōko Shimoji	Asadora	

=== Films ===
Year	Title	Role	Notes	Ref.
2016	Shin Godzilla			
2019	Listen to the Universe			
2021	Hold Me Back	Sawada		
2021	Love Mooning	Ikeda		
2021	The Blue Danube			
2021	It's a Flickering Life			
2022	Wedding High	Higuchi		
2023	Ice Cream Fever			
2024	Maru			
2026	The Canary's Lullaby	Kikuko	Taiwanese-Japanese film	

=== Dubbing ===
Year	Title	Role	Notes	Ref.
2016	The Good Dinosaur	Ramsey		

== Bibliography ==
=== Books ===
Year	Title	Notes
2006	Watashi no Matoka	
2007	Guatemala no Otōto	
2010	Mogiri yo Konya mo Arigatou	
