= Tora-san Goes Religious? =

- Theatrical poster
- Directed by: Yoji Yamada
- Written by: Yoji Yamada; Yoshitaka Asama
- Starring: Kiyoshi Atsumi; Keiko Takeshita
- Cinematography: Tetsuo Takaba
- Edited by: Iwao Ishii
- Music by: Naozumi Yamamoto
- Distributed by: Shochiku
- Release date: December 28, 1983
- Running time: 105 minutes
- Country: Japan
- Language: Japanese

Tora-san Goes Religious? (男はつらいよ 口笛を吹く寅次郎, Otoko wa Tsurai yo: Kuchibue o Fuku Torajirō) aka Torasan Whistling is a 1983 Japanese comedy film directed by Yoji Yamada. It stars Kiyoshi Atsumi as Torajirō Kuruma (Tora-san), and Keiko Takeshita as his love interest or "Madonna". Tora-san Goes Religious? is the thirty-second entry in the popular, long-running Otoko wa Tsurai yo series.

== Synopsis ==
When his travels bring him to Western Japan, Tora-san decides to pay his respects to the late Hyoichiro Suwa, his sister's father-in-law. He gets drunk with the priest at the temple, falling in love with the priest's daughter in the process. When the priest is too hung-over to deliver a eulogy the next morning, Tora-san takes his place, with great success. Tora-san's sister and his brother-in-law's family show up for Hyoichiro Suwa's memorial service, and an argument breaks out over his estate.

== Cast ==
- Kiyoshi Atsumi as Torajirō
- Chieko Baisho as Sakura
- Keiko Takeshita as Tomoko
- Kiichi Nakai as Kazumichi
- Kaoru Sugita as Hiromi
- Shimojo Masami as Kuruma Tatsuzō
- Chieko Misaki as Tsune Kuruma (Torajiro's aunt)
- Gin Maeda as Hiroshi Suwa
- Hidetaka Yoshioka as Mitsuo Suwa
- Yoko Nada as Eriko
- Isamu Nagato as Osakaya
- Hisao Dazai as Boss (Umetarō Katsura)
- Gajirō Satō as Genkō
- Chishū Ryū as Gozen-sama
- Tatsuo Matsumura as Oshō

== Critical appraisal ==
Tora-san Goes Religious? was the fifth highest earning film at Japanese box-offices in 1984. Stuart Galbraith IV ranks the film as one of the best in the series, noting that the "performances are excellent all-around". Galbraith observes that the film's storyline was probably inspired by the recent death of the great film actor Takashi Shimura who had played the role of the deceased Hyoichiro Suwa in three previous Otoko wa Tsurai yo films. The German-language site molodezhnaja gives Tora-san Goes Religious? four out of five stars.

== Availability ==
Tora-san Goes Religious? had was released in theaters on December 28, 1983.

In Japan, the film was released on videotape in 1987 and 1986, and in DVD format in 1998 and 2008.

== Bibliography ==
=== English ===
- "OTOKO WA TSURAI YO KUCHIBUE O FUKU TORAJIRO (1983)". British Film Institute. Archived from the original on 2012-10-17.
- "OTOKO WA TSURAIYO -KUCHIBUE O FUKU TORAJIRO". Complete Index to World Film.
- Otoko wa tsurai yo: Kuchibue wo fuku Torajirô (1983) at IMDb
- Galbraith IV, Stuart (2006-07-06). "Tora-san 32: Tora-san Goes Religious (Region 3)". DVD Talk.

=== German ===
- "Tora-San Goes Religious" (in German). www.molodezhnaja.ch.

=== Japanese ===
- 男はつらいよ 口笛を吹く寅次郎(1983) (in Japanese). allcinema.net.
- "男はつらいよ 口笛を吹く寅次郎". Japanese Cinema Database (Agency for Cultural Affairs). Archived from the original on 2014-04-13.
- 男はつらいよ 口笛を吹く寅次郎 (in Japanese). Japanese Movie Database.
- 男はつらいよ 口笛を吹く寅次郎 (in Japanese). Kinema Junpo. Archived from the original on 2012-03-24.
