= Kyōfu =

- Japanese movie poster
- Directed by: Hiroshi Takahashi
- Screenplay by: Hiroshi Takahashi
- Produced by: Takashige Ichise
- Starring: Mina Fujii; Yuri Nakamura; Nagisa Katahira
- Cinematography: Akiko Ashizawa
- Edited by: Yoshifumi Fukazawa
- Music by: Hiroyuki Nakashima
- Distributed by: Tokyo Theatres; Lions Gate Entertainment
- Release date: July 10, 2010
- Running time: 94 minutes
- Country: Japan
- Language: Japanese

Kyōfu (Japanese: 恐怖), also known as The Sylvian Experiments, is a 2010 Japanese horror film directed by Hiroshi Takahashi who is known as a screenwriter of Ring. It was released on 10 July 2010.

== Plot ==
Two married neurosurgeons, Etsuko and Yukio Ōta, watch a 16mm documentary film concerning a secret experiment involving the electrification of the temporal lobes of several Japanese, Manchu, and Russian subjects, ending with said subjects projecting a blinding white light. Their children, Miyuki and Kaori, watch the film as well. Years later, Miyuki and three others conduct a mock mass suicide as part of their initiation into a similar experiment conducted by Etsuko. Miyuki wakes up inside a facility to one of Etsuko's assistants, Hisae, who insists that she has died and is currently astral projecting, even presenting her with her corpse as proof. Miyuki and another subject, Rieko, are later found to have escaped the facility unnoticed.

After having lost contact with her sister for six months, Kaori visits the hospital where Miyuki once worked and meets with her co-worker and lover, Motojima, who introduces her to Detective Hirasawa. Miyuki's laptop contains a suicide website that she might have used. Hirasawa questions a witness who saw a figure inside Miyuki's apartment after her disappearance. Kaori realizes that she has dreamed of being in Miyuki's apartment and seeing a white light nearby. Miyuki visits Kaori in a dream that night to tell her to stop looking for her and that she is "no longer her sister". Kaori is confronted by Etsuko and is taken to the facility to learn about the experiment. Witnessing how Miyuki has bended realities around her since the experiment, Etsuko conducts the experiment on herself and Kaori, revealing that she and Yukio have always wanted to know the "true" reality beyond the current one to achieve a spiritual evolution, and the film had provided them with the means to it. However, she stops the experiment just when Kaori sees a young Miyuki and herself staring at the white light, apparently because Kaori would have been consumed by it.

The next day, Kaori tells Motojima that her father committed suicide following a neurosurgery failure, while her mother is a skeptic of the afterlife and believes that there is nothing after death. The two visit Kaori's childhood home and meet with an ethereal Miyuki. It is revealed that Motojima was the one who informed Miyuki of the website and has been in league with Etsuko, who tracks the sisters and kills Hirasawa. All of them return to the facility with Rieko, now pregnant despite being a virgin. Motojima reveals that Miyuki's corpse is actually a hologram meant to fool her and that she is still alive. Motojima shows the film to Kaori and Miyuki, with Etsuko explaining that the white light actually projects what the viewer is dreaming. Yukio wanted to further the spiritual evolution, so the light "followed" him back into reality until he could not take it anymore and killed himself. However, Rieko is suicidal and wants nothing more, so the light has impregnated her with the "afterlife", i.e. nothing. Rieko gives birth to the "afterlife", which consumes Motojima, while Etsuko is consumed when she experiments on herself as well. At the forest, Kaori and Miyuki walk together until Kaori realizes that Miyuki had "died" long ago when she found that she could not fit herself with the world and runs away from her sister.

The film closes with an alive Hirasawa inspecting the bodies of Miyuki, Kazushi, Takumi, Rieko, and Hattori and Kaori lamenting of remains on the ground.

== Cast ==
- Mina Fujii as Kaori Ōta
  - Rio Sasaki as Young Kaori
- Yuri Nakamura as Miyuki Ōta
  - Haruna Tanaka as Young Miyuki
- Nagisa Katahira as Etsuko Ōta
- Sō Kusakabe as Motojima
- Momoko Hatano as Rieko
- Chōei Takahashi as Detective Hirasawa
- Yōichirō Saitō as Hattori
- Kimika Yoshino as Hisae
- Yōko Chōsokabe as Masami
- Tomohiro Kaku as Kazushi
- Ryō Matsushima as Takumi
- Kōji Satō as Yukio Ōta
- Kenichi Takitō as Man on the Opposite Side of the Apartment
