= Yuri Nakamura =

Japanese and Korean actress and singer (1982–2026)

- 中村 ゆり 나카무라 유리
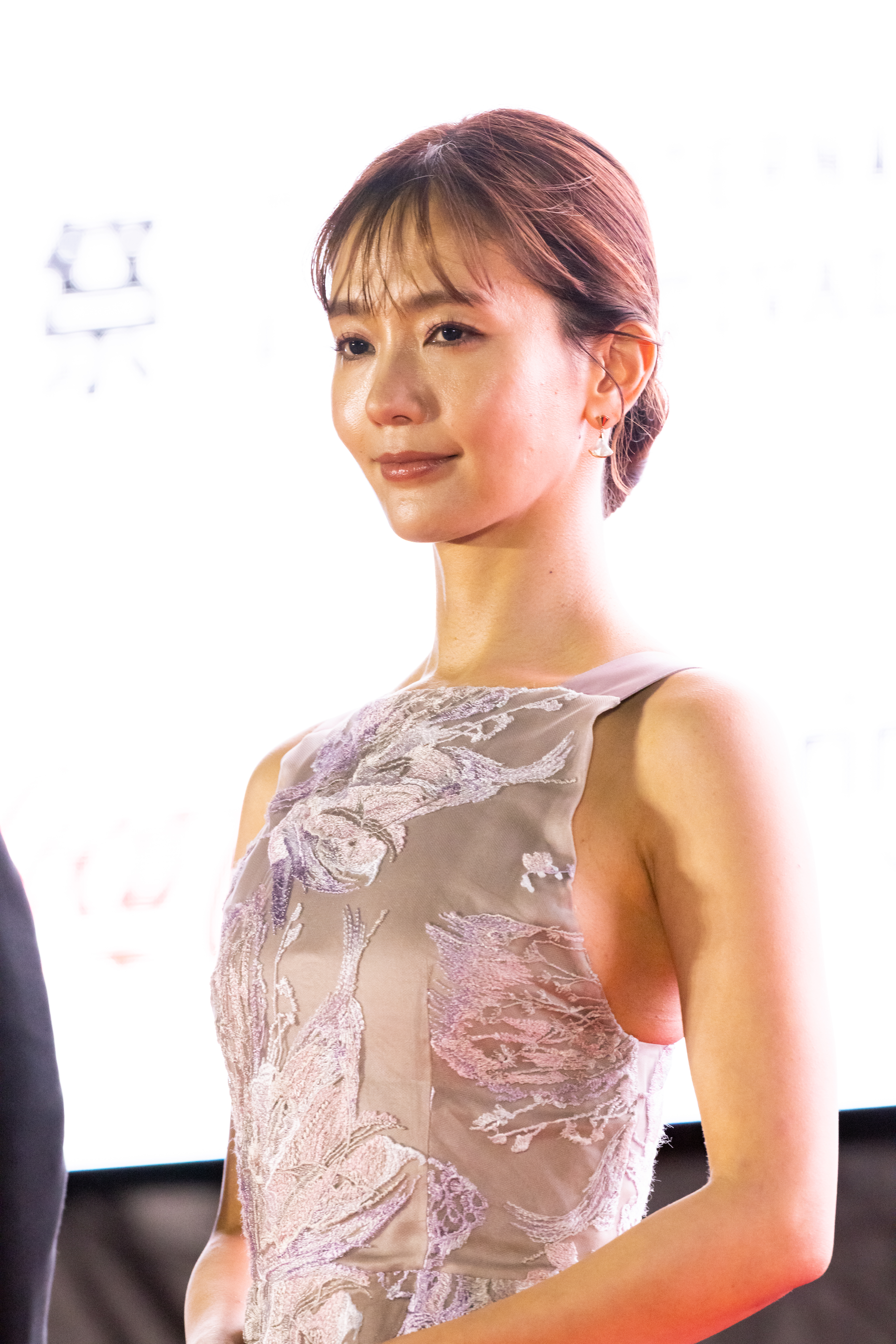
- Nakamura in 2022
- Born: Yuri Sei, Woori Song; 15 March 1982; Neyagawa, Osaka, Japan
- Died: 1 September 2026 (aged 44); Tokyo, Japan
- Citizenship: South Korea
- Occupation: Actress
- Years active: 1998–2026
- Agent: Alpha Agency
- Notable work: Pacchigi! Love & Peace; Tengoku kara no Love Letter
- Website: Official profile

Yuri Nakamura (中村 ゆり, 中村 友理, Nakamura Yuri; 15 March 1982 – 1 September 2026) was a Japanese and Korean actress and singer. Her real name was Yuri Sei (成 友理, Sei Yūri) or Woori Song (Korean: 성우리; RR: Seong Uri).

== Background ==
Nakamura was born in Neyagawa, Osaka, Japan on 15 March 1982. Her father was a third-generation Zainichi Korean and her mother was Korean and held citizenship in both South Korea and Japan. Nakamura, like many other multiracial Asians, had two names: her Japanese name Yuri Sei, and her Korean name Woo-ri Song.

Nakamura died on 1 September 2026, at the age of 44, after battling rectal cancer. On 14 September, news of her death was provided by her agency.

== Career ==
Nakamura passed the singing audition of Asayan in 1996. She later formed the music duo YuriMari with her friend Mari Izawa, and made her music debut in 1998 with the duo. In 1999 the duo broke up.

Later on Nakamura became an actress under the name Yuri Nakamura and acted often in films, television dramas and music videos.

In 2007, she appeared in Break Through!'s sequel Pacchigi! Love & Peace as Kyonja; her performance in such became one of her more popular roles. In October 2008 Nakamura appeared in the company play 1945, which also contributed heavily to her popularity. Later in the year she won the Rookie Award of the 3rd Osaka Cinema Festival for her role in the film Pacchigi! Love & Peace.

She was good friends with actress and dancer Asuka Kitabayashi, and they privately traveled together.

== Filmography ==
=== Film ===
Year	Title	Role	Notes	Ref.
2003	Gūzen ni mo Saiakuna Shōnen	Aoi		
2004	Ana: Kaiki Ana Ningen	Hanae		
2004	Yuda			
2007	Sakuran	Maizuru		
2007	Pacchigi! Love & Peace	Keiko Ri		
2007	Tengoku kara no Love Letter	Yayoi Motomura	Lead role	
2009	Lala Pipo	Tomoko Sato		
2009	Ju-On: Black Ghost	Mariko		
2009	Meon: Lamp Way no Mukō ni	Ayaka	Lead role	
2010	Parade	Kiwako Shoen		
2010	Bungo Nihon Bungaku Cinema: Majutsu	Ayako		
2010	Kyōfu	Miyuki Ota		
2010	Sakuradamon-gai no Hen	Ino		
2010	Bakamono	Yuki Yamane		
2011	I Wish			
2011	Ayashiki Bungō Kaidan: Ato no Hi	Tomiko Muro		
2011	Inu no omawarisan: Te no hira Wanko 3D	Kimiko Ban		
2011	Shuffle	Kaori Makino		
2012	Hayabusa: Harukanaru Kikan	Natsuko Matsumoto		
2012	A Sower of Seeds	Kanae Kurihara		
2012	Kogane o Daite Tobe	Keiko Kitagawa		
2012	Eden	Akane Nakazato		
2012	Boku no Naka no Otoko no Musume	Yuko Adachi		
2013	Hyaku-nen no Tokei	Yukino Shibu (young)		
2013	Like Father, Like Son	Sachiko Miyazaki		
2014	Genome Hazard	Han Yuri		
2014	Barairo no Būko	Michiru		
2014	My Hawaiian Discovery	Aiko Hayakawa		
2014	Entaku: Kokko, hito Natsu no Imagine	Tomomi Boku		
2014	Gekijōban Zero	Mayumi Aso		
2015	Maestro!			
2015	Dear Deer	Akiko	Lead role	
2016	After the Storm	Manami		
2017	The 8-Year Engagement	Mamiko Shimao		
2019	Aiuta: My Promise to Nakuhito			
2019	Sleep in the Shadows	Kyōko Nagai		
2019	21st Century Girl			
2019	Iwane: Sword of Serenity			
2019	Shadowfall			
2020	Fukushima 50	Kana Maeda		
2015	Zenkai no Uta	Ayaka Kawakami		
2021	Love Mooning	Kaoru Takizawa		
2021	Arc	Haru		
2021	DIVOC-12		Lead role; anthology film	
2022	Motherhood			
2022	By the Window			
2023	We Make Antiques! Osaka Dreams			
2023	Baian the Assassin, M.D.	Okō		
2023	Ichiko	Natsumi		
2024	Samurai Detective Onihei: Blood for Blood			
2025	A Moon in the Ordinary			

=== Television drama ===
Year	Title	Role	Notes	Ref.
2015	Garasu no Ashi	Rinko Sano		
2018	Good Doctor	Michi Togo		
2024	Beyond Goodbye	Miki Naruse		
2025	119: Emergency Call	Kazuha Takachiho		
2025	Romantics Anonymous	Irene		
2026	119: Emergency Call - Yokohama Blackout	Kazuha Takachiho		

== Awards ==
- 3rd Osaka Cinema Festival Newcomer Award (Pacchigi! Love & Peace)
- 2007 National Imaging Actress Award (Pacchigi! Love & Peace)
