= Hello! Stranger =

2014–2015 South Korean television series

- Genre: Variety
- Starring: Kim Kwang-kyu; Julien Kang; Kangnam; Mina Fujii
- Country of origin: South Korea
- Original language: Korean
- No. of seasons: 1
- No. of episodes: 13

Production
- Production location: South Korea
- Running time: 75 minutes

Original release
- Network: MBC
- Release: October 16, 2014 – January 15, 2015

Hello! Stranger (Korean: 헬로! 이방인) is a 2014 South Korean television program starring Kim Kwang-kyu, Julien Kang, Kangnam and Mina Fujii. It airs on MBC on Wednesday at 23:15 beginning October 16, 2014.

== Cast ==
Name	Birthday	Country	Episodes
Julien Kang	1982	France	5 – 13
Joey Mercadante	1982	Canada	1 – 4
Kangnam	1987	Japan	1 – 13
Mina Fujii	1988	Japan	1 – 8
David Levene	1989	United States	1 – 6
Lay	1989	China	1 – 8
John Rosenthal	1990	Germany	1 – 8
Franck Imani	1991	Democratic Republic of the Congo	1 – 13
Ali	1992	Pakistan	1 – 2
Amira	1992	Libya	1 – 6
Jake Pains	1987	United Kingdom	3 – 8
Hasan Ozgunduz	1989	Turkey	7 – 13
Hansol Vernon Choi	1998	United States	9 – 13
Samy Rashad	1990	Egypt	11 – 13
Jacob	1991	Canada	11 – 13
