= Eiko Koike =

Japanese actress (born 1980)

- 小池 栄子
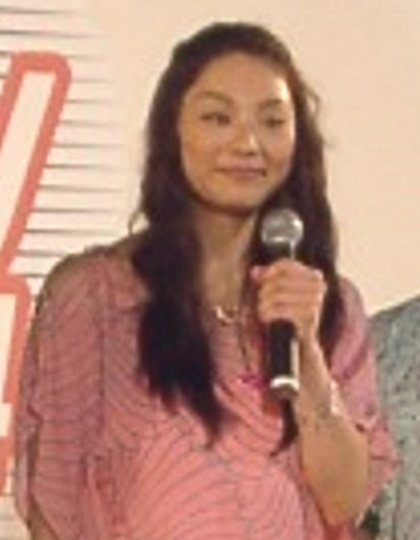
- Koike in 2004
- Born: November 20, 1980 (age 45); Setagaya, Tokyo, Japan
- Occupation: Actress
- Years active: 1998–present
- Spouse: Wataru Sakata (m. 2007)

Eiko Koike (小池 栄子, Koike Eiko) is a Japanese actress and former gravure model.

== Biography ==
Koike starred in Kunitoshi Manda's film The Kiss. She appeared in Kiyoshi Kurosawa's 2012 television drama Penance, and co-starred in Junji Sakamoto's A Chorus of Angels with Sayuri Yoshinaga. She also co-starred in Masanori Tominaga's Vengeance Can Wait with Takayuki Yamada. She was nominated for Best Supporting Actress at Japan Academy Prize for her outstanding performance in the film Rebirth.

== Filmography ==
=== Film ===
- Kamikaze Girls (2004)
- 2LDK (2004)
- Yaji and Kita: The Midnight Pilgrims (2005)
- The Kiss (2007)
- Paco and the Magical Book (2008)
- 20th Century Boys (2009)
- Vengeance Can Wait (2010)
- No Longer Human (2010)
- Rebirth (2011)
- Railways (2011)
- Liar Game: Reborn (2012)
- A Chorus of Angels (2012)
- Unforgiven (2013), Okaji
- April Fools (2015)
- A Living Promise (2016)
- Terraformars (2016)
- To Each His Own (2017)
- Close-Knit (2017), Naomi
- Perfect Revolution (2017)
- Recall (2018)
- Sunny: Our Hearts Beat Together (2018)
- Hit Me Anyone One More Time (2019), Nozomi Banba
- Poupelle of Chimney Town (2020), Rola (voice)
- A Morning of Farewell (2021)
- Jigoku no Hanazono: Office Royale (2021), Reina Onimaru
- Struggling Man (2021)
- Hey, Dazai: The Movie (2025), Tomiko Yabe
- F(r)iction (2026), Kakiuchi

=== Television ===
- Bayside Shakedown (1997)
- Ōoku (2005), Oden
- Yoshitsune (2005), Tomoe Gozen
- Penance (2012)
- Legal High (2012–13)
- Zero: Ikkakusenkin Game (2018)
- Ōoku the Final (2019), Gekkō-in
- A Day-Off of Ryoma Takeuchi (2020)
- Our Sister's Soulmate (2020), Hinako Ichihara
- Gourmet Detective Goro Akechi (2021), Maria Magdalene
- The 13 Lords of the Shogun (2022), Hōjō Masako
- Tokyo Swindlers (2024)
- Hey, Dazai (2025), Tomiko Yabe
- Pray Speak What Has Happened (2025), Izanagi Duncan

=== Dubbing roles ===
- Mulan, Xian Lang (Gong Li)
