= Bok Geo-il =

South Korean writer (born 1946)

- Born: March 20, 1946 (age 80); Asan, Southern Korea (now Asan, South Korea)
- Education: Seoul National University
- Occupation: Author
- Writing career
- Language: Korean
- Genres: Science fiction, alternate history
- Notable work: ''In Search of the Epitaph'' (1987)

- Korean name
- Hangul: 복거일
- Hanja: 卜鉅一
- RR: Bok Geoil
- MR: Pok Kŏil

Bok Geo-il (Korean: 복거일; born March 20, 1946) is a South Korean novelist, poet, literary critic and social commentator.

== Early life and education ==
Bok was born in Asan, South Chungcheong Province, United States Army Military Government in Korea. Bok graduated from the Business School of the Seoul National University and held various jobs in banking, manufacturing, and trading until 1987 when he made his literary debut with the novel, In Search of the Epitaph (Bimyeongeul chajaseo). That same year, his poems were recommended for publication in Contemporary Literature and the following year, his first collection of poems, Ojangwon (Ojangwon) was published. Bok has been controversial for his theories supporting the universalization of English in Korea.

== Career ==
Bok is an unusual among writers in South Korea as he debuted by writing and publishing a novel without having gone through the traditional literary contest procedure by which the title of "author" is bestowed in South Korea.

Bok first gained fame for his debut novel In Search of the Epitaph, published in 1987. This novel built an alternative history of Korea based on the assumption that Ito Hirobumi - governor-general of colonized Korea, who was assassinated had lived sixteen years longer and Korea was never liberated from Japan.

A writer of many interests and multifarious voices, Bok has also experimented with science fiction as a vehicle for exploring the effect of scientific innovations and technological development on human life. Notable among his science fiction are Under the Blue Moon (Parandal arae, 1992) which was serialized on internet and A Wayfarer in History (Yeoksa sogui nageunae, 1991) which features time travel back to mid-Joseon Dynasty period.

In Gijichon In Camp Seneca (1994), a novel about gijichon or the red light district around U.S. military bases in South Korea, Bok minimizes political or ideological bias to realistically depict the conflict between indigenous culture and foreign culture as seen through the eyes of an innocent boy. Since 1994, Bok has focused more on literary criticism and essays than fiction. Bok published his second volume of poetry A Lullaby for an Aging Wife (Nai deureoganeun anaereul wihan jajangga) in 2001.

His 1987 novel, ''In Search of the Epitaph'', was made into a film in 2002, although he disapproved of the finished product and distanced himself from it.

== Bibliography ==
- The Fall of Ojangwon
- ''In Search of the Epitaph'' (Bimyeongeul chataso, 1987)
- Under the Blue Moon (Parandal arae, 1992)
- A Wayfarer in History (Yeoksa sogui nageunae, 1991) which features time travel back to mid-Joseon Dynasty period.
- Gijichon In Camp Seneca (1994)
- A Lullaby for an Aging Wife (Nai deureoganeun anaereul wihan jajangga) in 2001
- The Unforgotten War. Singapore: Stallion Press. 2014. ISBN 978-9810787905. OCLC 894544320.
- Pok, Kŏ-il (2014). The Jovian Sayings. ISBN 978-9810787912.
