= Yoko Moriguchi =

Japanese actress (born 1966)

- Born: 5 August 1966 (age 60); Tokyo, Japan
- Occupation: Actress
- Years active: 1983–present
- Spouse: Yūji Sakamoto (m. 1998)
- Children: 1
- Awards: Japanese Professional Movie Awards 2003 Unloved – Best Actress
- Website: shochiku-enta.co.jp/actress/moriguchi/

Yoko Moriguchi (森口 瑤子, Moriguchi Yōko; born August 5, 1966) is a Japanese actress. She made her film debut with Tora-san Goes Religious? in 1983.

== Filmography ==
=== Film ===
- Tora-san Goes Religious? (1983)
- Final Take (1986)
- Chichi (1988)
- Kacho Shima Kosaku (1992)
- Unloved (2001)
- Casshern (2004)
- The Taste of Fish (2008)
- Rebirth (2011)
- Key of Life (2012)
- Orange (2015)
- Solomon's Perjury 2: Judgment (2015)
- The Sun (2016)
- To Each His Own (2017)
- Shoplifters (2018)
- He Won't Kill, She Won't Die (2019)
- Come On, Kiss Me Again! (2020)
- Hiroshima Piano (2020)
- Love Mooning (2021)
- I'll Be Your Ears (2021)
- The Lone Ume Tree (2021)
- Whisper of the Heart (2022), Shizuku's mother
- Shylock's Children (2023)
- Cross My Mind (2024)
- One Year to Live, Buy a Man (2026), Yui's stepmother

=== Television ===
- Hissatsu Shigotonin V (1985)
- A.D. Boogie (1991)
- Imoto Yo (1994)
- Toki o Kakeru Shojo (1994)
- Hachidai Shogun Yoshimune (1995), Takehime
- Minikui Ahiru no Ko (1996)
- Sono Ki ni Naru Made (1996)
- Love Generation (1997)
- Perfect Love (1999)
- Yamato Nadeshiko (2000)
- Quiz (2000)
- Mona Lisa no Hohoemi (2000)
- Aoi (2000), Lady Okaji
- Handoku (2001)
- 2001 no Otoko Un (2001)
- Hero (2001)
- Shomuni 3 (2002)
- Salaryman Kintaro 3 (2002)
- Marusa!! (2003)
- Diamond Girl (2003)
- Kimi ga Omoide ni Naru Mae ni (2004)
- Wonderful Life (2004)
- Hikari to Tomo ni (2004)
- Suna no Utsuwa (2004)
- Keishicho Kanshiki Han 2004 (2004)
- Risou no Seikatsu (2005)
- Sokoku (2005)
- Yonimo Kimyona Monogatari Nekama na Otoko (2005)
- Kegareta Shita (2005)
- Yoshitsune (2005)
- Boku no Aruku Michi (2006)
- 59 Banme no Proposal (2006)
- Attention Please (2006)
- Jikou Keisatsu (2006)
- Hanochi (2007)
- Swan no Baka (2007)
- Hanazakari no Kimitachi e (2007)
- Natsu Kumo Agare (2007)
- Byouin no Chikara (2007)
- Warui Yatsura (2007)
- General Rouge no Gaisen (2010)
- Chichi, Nobunaga (2017)
- AIBOU: Tokyo Detective Duo (2020–present), Mari Koide
- Brothers in Arms (2026), Fuku
