= Inuhiko Yomota =

Japanese author, cultural essayist, translator, film historian and critic

- Born: Goki Yomota; February 20, 1953 (age 72); Nishinomiya, Hyōgo Prefecture, Japan
- Occupation: Film critic

Inuhiko Yomota (四方田 犬彦, Yomota Inuhiko, born February 20, 1953) is a Japanese author, cultural essayist, translator, film historian, and critic. His real name is Goki Yomota (四方田 剛己, Yomota Gōki).

== Biography ==
Inuhiko Yomota was born on February 20, 1953, in Nishinomiya, Hyōgo Prefecture, but grew up in Tokyo. He graduated from the University of Tokyo in religious studies, and continued in graduate school there to study comparative literature and culture. After finishing graduate school, he traveled the world as a guest professor and researcher at Konkuk University in South Korea, Columbia University in the United States, the University of Bologna in Italy, Tel Aviv University in Israel and Pristina University in Kosovo. He was formerly a professor of film studies and comparative literature at Meiji Gakuin University. He is married to Chie Tarumi, a scholar of Taiwanese literature during the Japanese occupation.

His main area of study is film history, particularly the history of film in East Asian countries, and organizes an annual symposium on differing topics in film history. His other areas of study include cooking, literature, manga, music, cultural minorities, foreign language, and foreign countries (especially Korea).

Inuhiko Yomota has published nearly eighty books since the beginning of his career and has won several literary prizes for his work, including the Kodansha Essay Prize. He has also translated works by American and Palestinian authors into Japanese.

== Bibliography ==
=== Publications ===
- Ryumiēru no Tatakai: Eiga e no Zenshinteki Yokubō (1980)
- Eizō no Shōkan: Essay Cinematographique (1983)
- Eizō Yōri (1984)
- Critique (1984)
- Hito Sore wo Eiga to Yobu (1985)
- Eiga wa Mō Sugu Hyakusai ni Naru (1986)
- Warera ga "Tasha" Suru Kankoku (1987)
- Kishu to Tensei (1987)
- Shokutaku no Ue no Chiisa na Konton (1987)
- Kanjō Kyōiku (1988)
- Jojishi no Kennō (1988)
- Mō Hitori no Tenshi: Nostalgia to Shūshū wo Meguru 48 no Seisatsu (1988)
- Oukenbon: Papers '89~'90 (1991)
- Lu Xun: Mezamete Hito ha Doko e Iku ka (Ningen Monogatari) (1992)
- Tsukishima Monogatari (1992)
- Ekkyō no Ressun: Higashi Ajia no Genzai - Itsutsu no Taiwa (1992)
- Matsu Koto no Yorokobi (1992)
- Eiga no Ufufu (1992)
- Doll's House no Eigakan (1993)
- Yomu Koto no Anima: Kodomobeya no Sekai Bungaku (1993)
- Den'ei Fūun (1993)
- Akainu Hon: Papers '91~'92 (1993)
- Bungakuteki Kioku (1993)
- Kaihi to Kōdei (1994)
- Manga Genron (1994)
- Kūsō Ryokō no Shūjigaku: "Garibā Ryokōki" Ron (1996)
- Kishu to Tensei: Nakagami (1996)
- Odysseus no Kikan (1996)
- Eigashi e no Shōtai (1998)
- Kokoro Tokimekasu (1998)
- Hoshi to Tomo ni Hashiru: Nisshi 1979-1997 (1999)
- Ōkami ga Kuru zo! (1999)
- Nihon Eiga no Radikaru na Ishi (1999)
- 21-seiki wo Mezasu Korian Firumu (1999)
- Tabi no Ōsama (1999)
- Nihon Eigashi 100-nen (2000)
- Morokko Rutaku (2000)
- Nihon no Joyū: Nihon no 50-nen Nihon no 200-nen(2000)
- Kedamono to Watashi (2000)
- Marco Polo to Shobutsu (2000)
- Tetsugaku Shokan (2000)
- Souru no Fūkei: Kioku to Henbō (2001)
- High School: Bookish Life (2001)
- Ajia no Naka no Nihon Eiga (2001)
- Daisuki na Kankoku (2003)
- Eiga to Hyōshō Fukanōsei (2003)
- Ajia Eiga to Taishūteki Sōzōryoku (2003)
- Mametsu no Uta (2003)
- High School 1968 (2004)
- Yubi ga Tsuki wo Sasu Toki, Gusha wa Yubi o Miru: Sekai no Mei Serifu 50 (2004)
- Shirato Sanpei Ron (2004)
- Kokoro ha Korogaru Ishi no Yō ni: Papers 2003-2004 (2004)
- Kōkai no Mae no Dokusho (2004)
- Rabelais no Kodomotachi (2005)
- Miru Koto no Shio: Paresuchina/Serubia Kikō (2005)
- Bruce Lee: Li Xiaolong no Eikō to Kodoku (2005)
- "Kawaii" Ron (2006)
- Paresuchina Nau: Sensō/Eiga/Ningen (2006)
- Sensei to Watashi (2007)
- Ningen wo Mamoru Dokusho (2007)
- Hon'yaku to Zasshin: Dulcinea Blanca (2007)
- Nihon no Marāno bungaku: Dulcinea Roja (2007)
- Nihon Eiga to Sengo no Shinwa (2007)
- Tsukishima Monogatari Futatabi (2007)
- Roba to Sūpu: Papers 2005-2007 (2007)
- Yomota Inuhiko no Hikkoshi Jinsei (2008)

=== Compilation & editing ===
- Eiga Kantoku Mizoguchi Kenji (1999)
- Li Xianglan to Higashi Ajia (2001)
- The Greatest Hits of Hiraoka Masaaki (2001)
- Ajia Eiga (2003)
- Yoshida Yoshishige no Zentaizō (2004)
- Joyū Yamaguchi Momoe (2006)
- Ozu Yasujiro Taizen (2019)

=== Translations ===
- Shikō Taiken Jigen no Tame no Shinrigaku (1979) - originally by Colin Wilson, collaboration with Kimiyoshi Yura
- Yūga na Emono (1989) - originally by Paul Bowles
- Kumo no Ie: Paul Bowles Sakuhinshū (1995) - originally by Paul Bowles
- Tomaru Koto Naku: Paul Bowles Jiden (1995) - originally by Paul Bowles
- Paresuchina e Kaeru (1999) - originally by Edward Said
- Merodoramateki Sōzōryoku (2002) - originally by Peter Brooks, collaboration with Keiko Kimura
- Shishū Kabe ni Egaku (2006) - originally by Mahmoud Darwish
