= The Kiss (2007 film) =

- Poster
- Directed by: Kunitoshi Manda
- Written by: Kunitoshi Manda; Tamami Manda
- Produced by: Takenori Sento
- Starring: Eiko Koike; Etsushi Toyokawa; Toru Nakamura
- Cinematography: Makoto Watanabe
- Music by: Hiroyuki Nagashima
- Release dates: November 22, 2007 (Tokyo FILMeX); March 8, 2008 (Japan)
- Running time: 108 minutes
- Country: Japan
- Language: Japanese

The Kiss (Japanese: 接吻, Hepburn: Seppun) is a 2007 Japanese crime drama film directed by Kunitoshi Manda, starring Eiko Koike, Etsushi Toyokawa and Toru Nakamura.

== Plot ==
Kyoko Endo, a young and lonely female office worker, falls in love with Akio Sakaguchi, a man in prison for killing a whole family, at first sight when she watches a television news program telling about him. But Hasegawa, his lawyer, worries about their relationship.

== Cast ==
- Eiko Koike as Kyoko Endo
- Etsushi Toyokawa as Akio Sakaguchi
- Toru Nakamura as Hasegawa

== Release ==
The 9th Jeonju International Film Festival opened with the world premiere of The Kiss in May 2008.

== Reception ==
Lee Hyo-won of The Korea Times said, "The film traces delicate human relationships and all its melodrama, all the while expressing ― or suppressing ― emotions with restraint." Japanese film critic Inuhiko Yomota said, "I think it's a fantastic film." The film was listed by the Film Comment magazine as their "18 Films to Look Out For" in 2008 and Japanese film critic Shigehiko Hasumi said, "The ending is astonishing and all three actors are excellent, in particular Eiko Koike, who plays the young woman."
