= Unloved =

2001 film

- Film poster
- Directed by: Kunitoshi Manda
- Written by: Kunitoshi Manda; Tamami Manda
- Produced by: Takenori Sento
- Starring: Yoko Moriguchi; Shunsuke Matsuoka; Tōru Nakamura
- Cinematography: Akiko Ashizawa
- Edited by: Shuichi Kakesu
- Music by: Kenji Kawai
- Production companies: Wowow; Bandai Visual; Suncent CinemaWorks
- Distributed by: Suncent CinemaWorks
- Release date: May 25, 2002 (Japan)
- Running time: 117 minutes
- Country: Japan
- Language: Japanese

Unloved is a 2001 Japanese romance film directed by Kunitoshi Manda in his directorial debut, starring Yoko Moriguchi, Shunsuke Matsuoka and Tōru Nakamura. It won the Grand Rail d'Or prize and the Future Talent prize at the 2001 Cannes Film Festival.

== Plot ==
Mitsuko (Yoko Moriguchi), a young woman, becomes involved with Hiroshi (Shunsuke Matsuoka), a poor young man who lives downstairs in the same apartment building, and Eiji (Tōru Nakamura), a rich entrepreneur.

== Cast ==
- Yoko Moriguchi as Mitsuko Kageyama
- Shunsuke Matsuoka as Hiroshi Shimokawa
- Tōru Nakamura as Eiji Katsuno

== Reception ==
Jonathan Crow of Allmovie gave the film 2 out of 5 stars and said, "Unloved is uninvolving and overly talky." David Stratton of Variety magazine said, "[Moriguchi] gives a good performance as the exacting heroine, while Nakamura and Matsuoka lend solid support as the two wildly contrasted guys."
