= Kunitoshi Manda =

Japanese filmmaker (born 1956)

- Born: 1956 (age 69–70); Tokyo, Japan
- Occupations: Film director, screenwriter, film critic
- Spouse: Tamami Manda

Kunitoshi Manda (万田 邦敏, Manda Kunitoshi; born 1956 in Tokyo) is a Japanese film director, screenwriter and film critic.

== Biography ==
Kunitoshi Manda was a student at Rikkyo University, where he took Shigehiko Hasumi's filmology class.

Manda directed his first feature film, Unloved, in 2001. It won the Grand Rail d'Or prize and the Future Talent prize at the 2001 Cannes Film Festival.

The Tunnel, one of his television films, screened at the 2004 Cannes Film Festival.

Manda's third feature film, The Kiss, premiered at the Jeonju International Film Festival in 2008. Japanese film critic Inuhiko Yomota praised the film as "a fantastic film."

His 2014 film, Dog's Way, premiered at the Yubari International Fantastic Film Festival.

== Filmography ==
=== Feature films ===
- Unloved (2001)
- Thank You (2006)
- The Kiss (2007)
- Dog's Way (2014)
- The Synchronizer (2017)
- Love Mooning (2021)

=== Short films ===
- Spaceship Remnant 6 (1996)
- Omokage (2010)

=== Television ===
- The Tunnel (2003)
- Tokyo Girl (2008, episode 3)

== Bibliography ==
- Sairishū Tottemo Hazukashi Zemināru (2009)
