= Mami (musician) =

Japanese musician (born 1990)

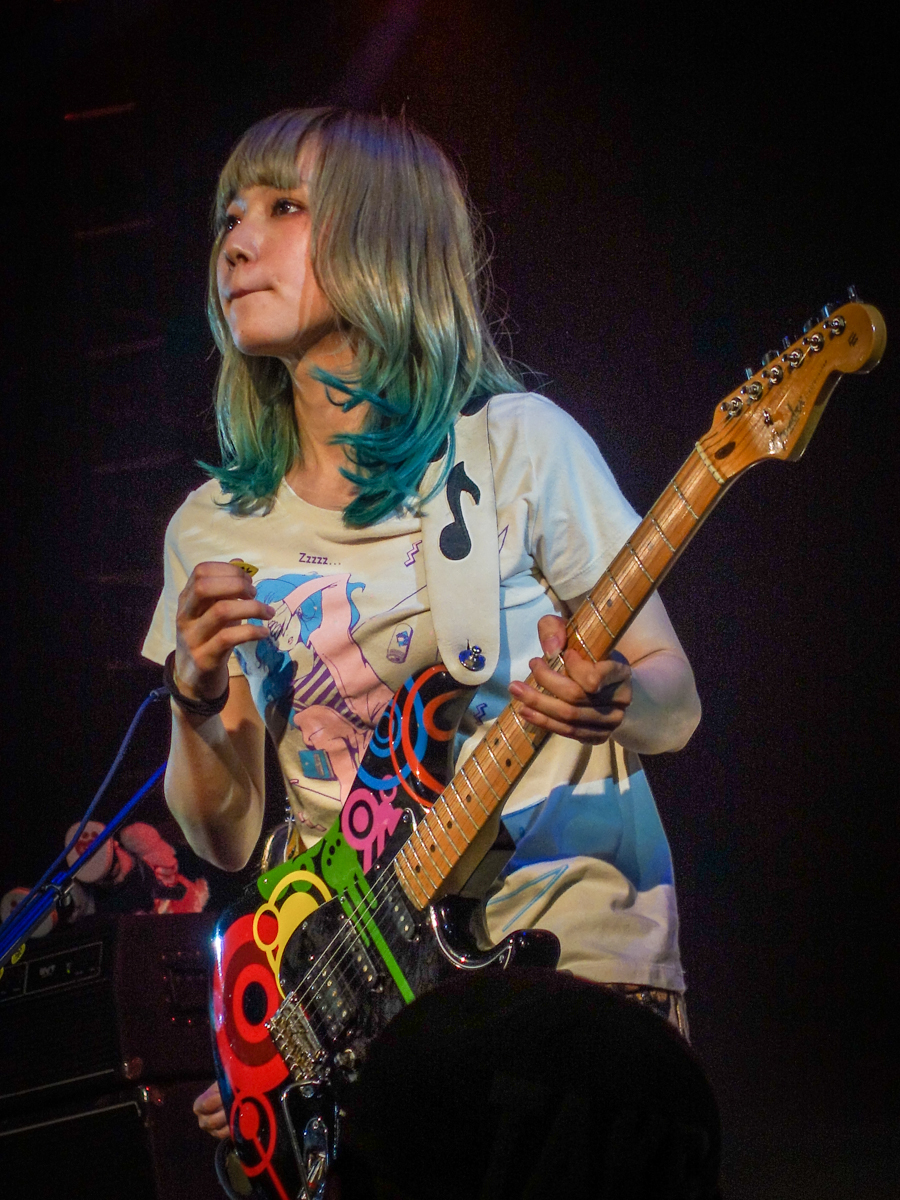
- Mami performing in 2015

Background information
- Born: May 21, 1990 (age 36); Nagoya, Aichi Prefecture, Japan
- Genres: Pop rock, garage rock
- Occupations: Musician, producer, singer, songwriter
- Instruments: Guitar, vocals
- Years active: 2006–present
- Member of: Scandal

Mami (Japanese: マミ; born May 21, 1990) is a Japanese musician, singer and songwriter. She is best known as lead guitarist of the all-female rock band Scandal since 2006. In addition to being a principal songwriter in the band, Mami occasionally sings lead vocals on songs such as "Koe" and "Oh! No!". In 2014, Mami and two of her bandmates became the first female Japanese musicians to have signature model guitars with Fender.

== Early life ==
Mami was born on May 21, 1990, in Nagoya, Aichi Prefecture, Japan. She was enrolled at Caless, a voice and dance school, where she and her Scandal bandmates met. Before making their debut, Mami appeared along with her future bandmate Tomomi and singer Yuya Matsushita in a TV commercial.

== Career ==
Scandal was formed in 2006, when Mami was 16 years old. In 2008, they had their first releases on the independent label Kitty Records before signing to Epic Records Japan and making their major label debut with "Doll" in October of that year. They won a Newcomer Award at the 51st Japan Record Awards in 2009. Scandal performed a concert at the Nippon Budokan in March 2012, marking the fastest debut at the prestigious venue by a "girl band" in history.

Mami and Scandal bassist Tomomi formed the rap duo Dobondobondo (どぼんどぼんど) in 2011. A music video for their song "Dobondobondo no Theme" (どぼんどぼんどのテーマ) was included on Scandal's Video Action home video released that year. The Dobondobondo song "Cherry Jam" was included on a limited edition of Scandal's 2012 single "Taiyō Scandalous". In 2016, the duo's songs "Sekapero" (セカペロ) and "Dobondobondo Dungeon" (どぼんどぼんどダンジョン) were included on different limited editions of Scandal's single "Take Me Out". A music video for "Dobondobondo Dungeon" was included on Scandal's Video Action 2 home video released later that year.

Mami wrote and composed the 2017 song "Exceeeed!!" for the idol group Yumemiru Adolescence. She also composed and arranged the 2018 song "Story" for singer Airi Suzuki.

Mami held her first solo performance as part of the Chōshidōkan ~Sō no Mori no Oto Shizuku~ event at Maruyama Park on October 4, 2020.

== Equipment ==
Mami mainly uses Fender guitars. She is closely associated with the Stratocaster, such as her black American Standard Stratocaster HSS with colorful circles, but also has several signature models with them. In May 2014, Fender's Squier brand released the Mami Jazzmaster Pearl White "Stratomaster". The "Stratomaster" nickname comes from the fact that it combines a Jazzmaster with elements of a Stratocaster. Models for two of her bandmates were released at the same time, making them the first female Japanese musicians to have signature model guitars with the company. In November 2017, it was announced that Mami had signed an endorsement contract with Fender. The Mami Stratocaster (R) model, which she had been using since July 2017, was released in December 2017. The red guitar with pearl pickguard was her first to have three single coil pickups. In August 2022, Fender released another Mami Stratocaster model, the Omochi. Its Mami Custom Humbucking Pickups feature an engraving of a geometric figure the guitarist designed herself. She named the guitar after omochi based on its vintage white color, pickup engraving, and sound.

== Discography ==
With Scandal

- Best Scandal (2009)
- Temptation Box (2010)
- Baby Action (2011)
- Queens Are Trumps: Kirifuda wa Queen (2012)
- Standard (2013)
- Hello World (2014)
- Yellow (2016)
- Honey (2018)
- Kiss from the Darkness (2020)
- Mirror (2022)

== Bibliography ==
- Rock Study Go!! (September 25, 2013)
