= Rina (musician) =

Japanese musician (born 1991)

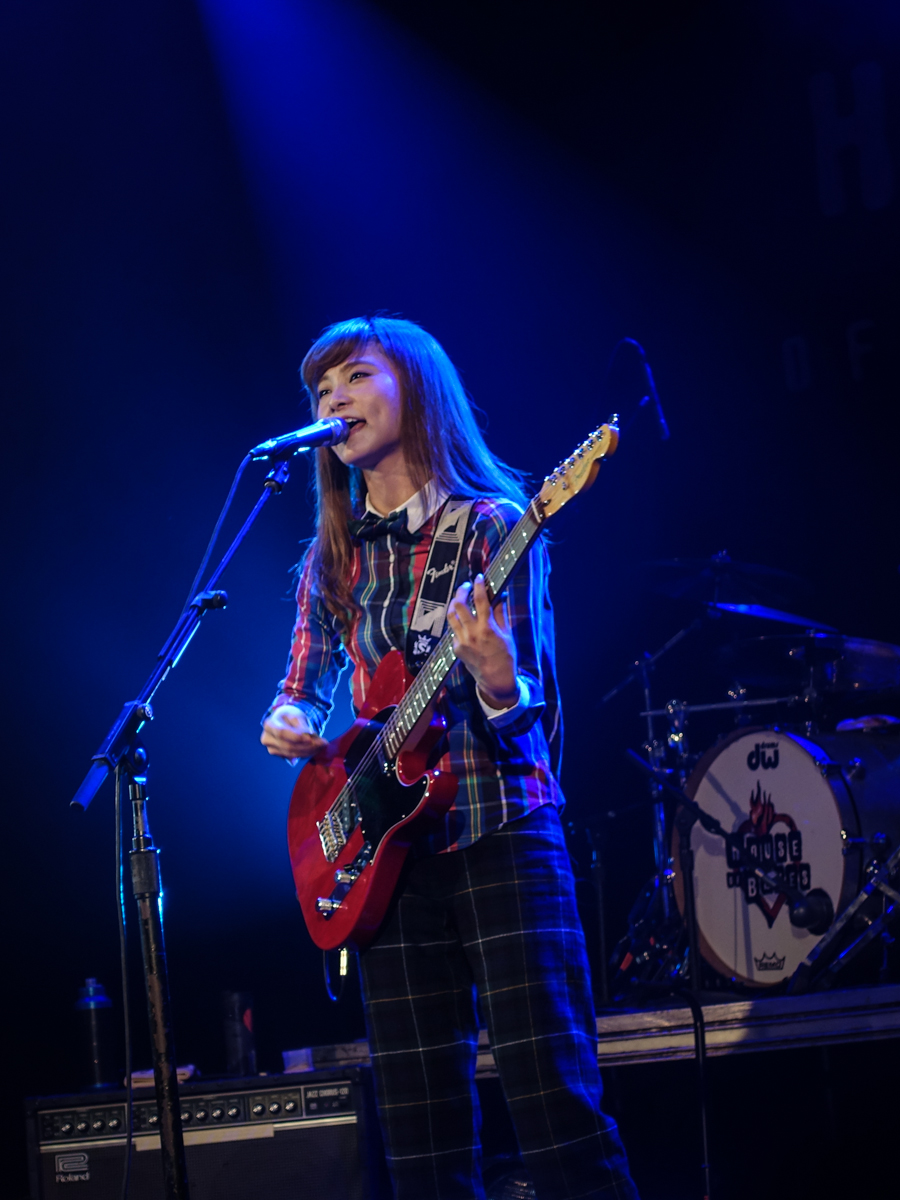
- Rina performing in 2015

Background information
- Born: August 21, 1991 (age 34); Kashiba, Nara, Japan
- Genres: Pop rock, garage rock
- Occupations: Musician, singer, songwriter
- Instruments: Drums, percussion, keyboards, synthesizers, guitar, vocals
- Years active: 2006–present
- Member of: Scandal

Rina (Japanese: リナ; born August 21, 1991) is a Japanese musician, singer and songwriter. She is best known as drummer of the all-female rock band Scandal since 2006. Rina occasionally performs lead vocals and guitar in the band. She is also a part of the sporadic supergroup Halloween Junky Orchestra led by Hyde and K.A.Z of Vamps for their October 2012 single "Halloween Party".

== Career ==
Scandal was formed in 2006, when Rina was 15 years old. In 2008, they had their first releases on the independent label Kitty Records before signing to Epic Records Japan and making their major label debut with "Doll" in October of that year. They won a Newcomer Award at the 51st Japan Record Awards in 2009. Scandal performed a concert at the Nippon Budokan in March 2012, marking the fastest debut at the prestigious venue by a "girl band" in history.

== Equipment ==
Suzuki plays and endorses Pearl Drums. She has her own signature edition snare drum and drumsticks made by the same company.

== Discography ==
With Scandal

- Best Scandal (2009)
- Temptation Box (2010)
- Baby Action (2011)
- Queens Are Trumps: Kirifuda wa Queen (2012)
- Standard (2013)
- Hello World (2014)
- Yellow (2016)
- Honey (2018)
- Kiss from the Darkness (2020)
- Mirror (2022)

== Bibliography ==
- It's Me Rina (July 15, 2016)
