= Honey (Scandal album) =

2018 studio album by Scandal

- Cover of the regular edition

Studio album by Scandal
- Released: February 14, 2018
- Recorded: 2016–2018
- Genre: Pop rock; alternative rock
- Length: 40:38
- Label: Epic Records Japan
- Producer: Scandal

Scandal chronology
| Yellow (2016) | Honey (2018) | Kiss from the Darkness (2020) |

Singles from Honey
- 1. "Take Me Out" Released: July 27, 2016; 2. "Koisuru Universe" Released: October 22, 2017

Honey is the eighth studio album by Japanese rock band Scandal. The album was released on February 14, 2018, by Epic Records Japan. It features a total of ten songs, including the 2016 single "Take Me Out". Honey reached number 3 on both the Oricon and Billboard Japan charts. The album was released on March 2, 2018, in Europe and North America by JPU Records.

== Background ==
According to lead guitarist Mami, Scandal chose Honey as the title because they felt it best described "“sweet” and “sharp” like a thorn and even “poisonous” all together." The album's artwork and lyrics also reflect this feeling as well. The artwork was done in collaboration with the band's friends Amiaya.

Like their previous album, 2016's Yellow, the members of Scandal wrote and composed all the songs on Honey themselves. However, unlike all their prior material where guitarists Mami and Haruna played mainly the same chords, for Honey they specifically kept them separate. Haruna played the foundation of power chords and low notes, while Mami stuck to single notes. With ten songs total, it is the band's shortest album of their career; they wanted to record only their strongest songs and feel that all ten fit together as a single story. Because lead vocalist Haruna did not write any of the lyrics, she said she was able to fully immerse herself as each song's protagonist and use different voices on each song.

== Themes ==
"Take Me Out" was released as the band's 10th anniversary single in July 2016. Mami said it was a rock song made specifically to play live.

"Koisuru Universe" was released as Scandal's first digital-only single in October 2017. Digital distribution was done as opposed to a physical release so that the title track could be heard before their joint tour that same month with the bands Unison Square Garden, 04 Limited Sazabys and Blue Encount. The song was created during their earlier 47 Prefecture Tour which was held from March to July 2017. The lyrics to the single's b-side, "Futari", were first drafted in summer 2016, while its music was completed at the beginning of 2017. Mami composed it under the influence of instrumental bands and to have a melody as if a guitar was singing. Both songs were intended to sound good live.

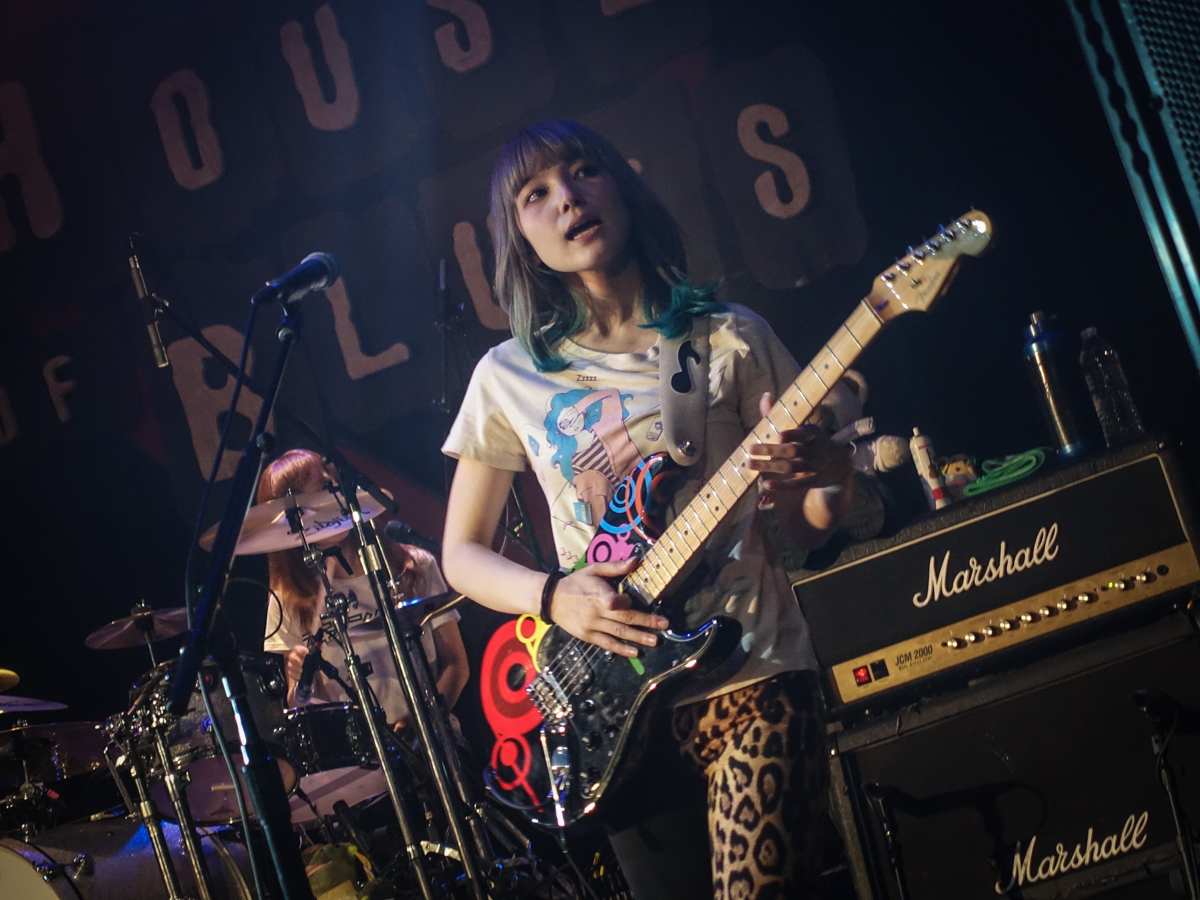
Lead guitarist Mami composed the music for all but two songs on the album.

Mami said that the band wanted "Platform Syndrome" to be "the face of the album" and described it as a very energetic rock song. She also explained that with a theme of "love songs from the woman's perspective", they imagined it and "Over" as connecting together. "Over" is a heavy rock track born from wanting a song that begins with guitar that "cuts through the air." These were the last two songs recorded, made just one week from their deadline. Each was made in a single day.

Mami called "Oh! No!" a "nonsensical song" that was written during their previous album, Yellow. She revealed that writing and composing it was easy and natural as she just included "whatever was on my mind at that time."

For the "urban dance" number "Midnight City", drummer Rina sings the verses while Haruna sings the chorus. Bassist Tomomi said she played funky phrases instead of octaves for the "disco-like" song.

For "Short Short", Rina was inspired by television and books and wrote the lyrics as a short-lived love story. Its title is supposed to suggest it is even shorter than a short story. Mami felt that it is the most emotional song on the album. She said that it is very simple sound-wise and therefore added voices to have "color". However, Haruna cited it as the most challenging song on the album for her, as she pushed herself to sing more gently than usual. It was actually made about two years prior and uses her vocal take from that time, although some parts were re-recorded.

Tomomi wrote "Mado wo Aketara" in 2015 with no plans to release it. She said that at the time "I felt like my soul sort of drifted out of me. I made this song in hopes of holding on to that feeling that I felt at that moment." While making Honey everyone kept telling her to include it, which she admits turned out to be great timing. Because of its personal nature, she asked her friend Mizuki Masuda from Negoto to arrange it.

Mami composed "Electric Girl", which she joked was a "weird dance" song, while playing around with her instruments. Its lyrics, which begin with onomatopoeia, came to Rina suddenly while taking a taxi home from the studio. The song has some auto-tuned vocals and a bass solo.

== Release ==
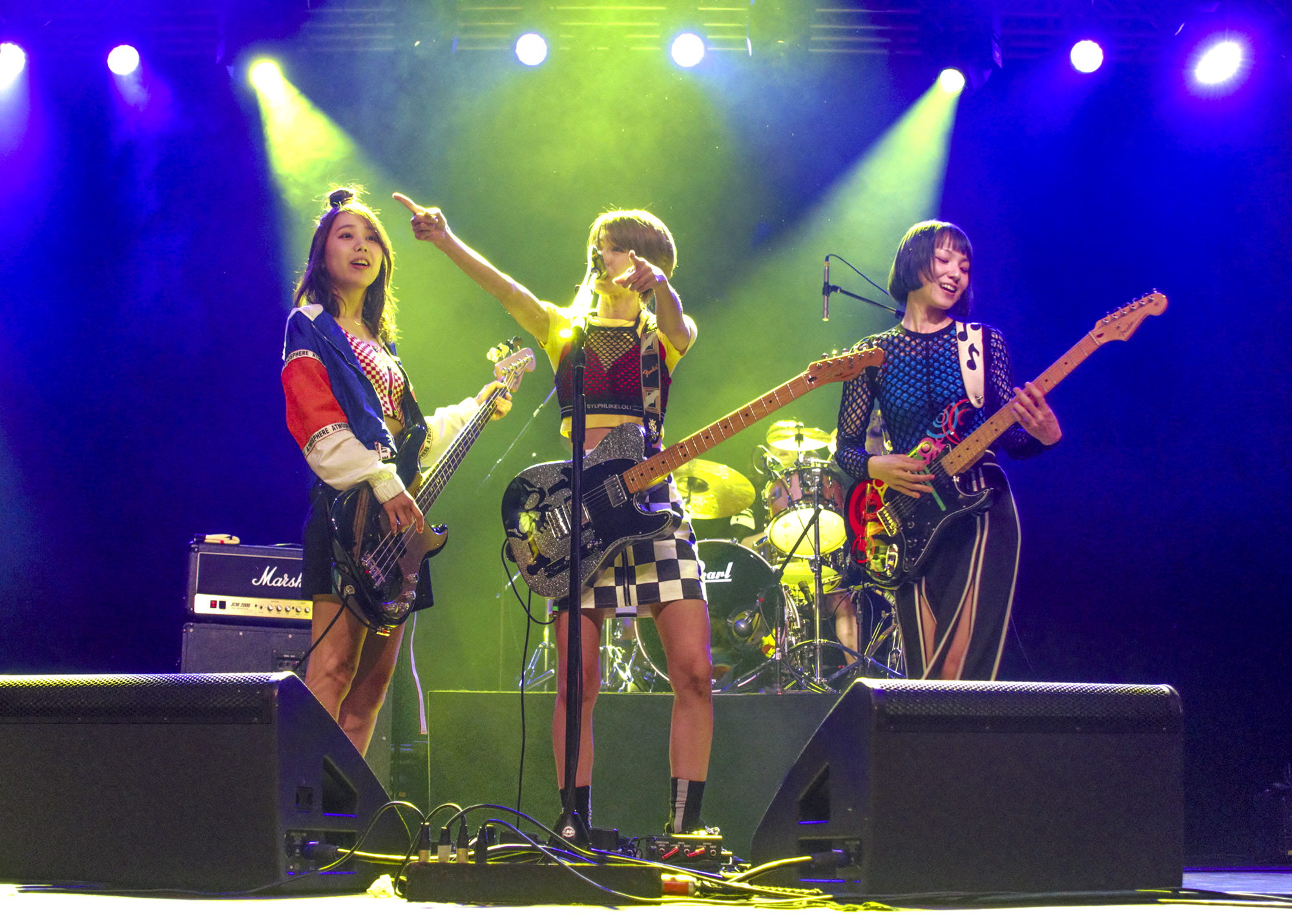
Scandal performing in California in 2018.

Honey was released in Japan on February 14, 2018. In addition to a regular edition, a first press limited edition of the album includes a DVD of their 11th anniversary concert, Storytellers: Scandal. Which marked the first time a Japanese band took part in the Storytellers television show. A different limited edition comes with a T-shirt designed by Amiaya. All three have different cover art.

The European edition of the album includes lyric translations. A limited edition including a T-shirt and guitar pick was limited to 200 copies.

To celebrate the album's release, Scandal held a free concert at Zepp DiverCity on the day of Honey's Japanese release for people who preordered it. The national Honey tour began on March 3 and concluded on May 25. The Asian leg took place in June with shows in Hong Kong, Beijing, Guangzhou, Manila and Taipei. A six-date North American tour took place in September 2018.

== Reception ==
In a review for JaME U.S.A., Chris N. wrote that with Honey Scandal returned to their garage rock roots but with "an emotional maturity and a technical sophistication" to their songwriting. He suggested that the only problem with the album might be that it is too short.

== Chart performance ==
Honey reached number three on the weekly Oricon chart and charted for 11 weeks. It also reached number three on Billboard Japan's Hot Albums chart. It reached number two on Billboard Japan's Top Albums Sales chart, which is based only on album sales. The album also topped nine charts across Europe, and reached the top 10 in three more.

== Track listing ==
All lyrics are written by Rina, except where noted. All music is composed and arranged by Mami, except where noted.

| No. | Title | Lyrics | Music | Arrangement | Length |
|---|---|---|---|---|---|
| 1. | "Platform Syndrome" (プラットホームシンドローム) | | | | 3:30 |
| 2. | "Over" | | | | 4:32 |
| 3. | "Take Me Out" (テイクミーアウト) | | | Ryo Eguchi | 3:44 |
| 4. | "Oh! No!" | Mami | | | 5:04 |
| 5. | "Midnight City" (ミッドナイトシティ) | | Rina | | 3:08 |
| 6. | "Short Short" (ショートショート) | | | | 3:53 |
| 7. | "Mado wo Aketara" (窓を開けたら, When the Window Was Opened) | Tomomi | Tomomi | Mizuki Masuda | 5:22 |
| 8. | "Futari" (ふたり, Two of Us) | | | Keita Kawaguchi | 3:44 |
| 9. | "Electric Girl" (エレクトリックガール) | | | | 3:44 |
| 10. | "Koisuru Universe" (恋するユニバース) | | | Kawaguchi | 4:17 |
| Total length: | | | | | 40:38 |

First press limited edition DVD: Storytellers: Scandal
| No. | Title | Length |
|---|---|---|
| 1. | "Shunkan Sentimental" (瞬間センチメンタル) |
| 2. | "Kimi to Yoru to Namida" (キミと夜と涙) |
| 3. | "Love Me Do" |
| 4. | "Koe (Acoustic Ver.)" (声(Acoustic ver.)) |
| 5. | "Doll" |
| 6. | "Koisuru Universe" (恋するユニバース) |
| 7. | "Take Me Out" (テイクミーアウト) |
| 8. | "Hachigatsu" (8月) |
| 9. | "Scandal Baby" |
| Total length: | | 57:22 |

== Personnel ==
Scandal

- Haruna – lead vocals, rhythm guitar
- Mami – lead guitar, lead vocals on "Oh! No!"
- Tomomi – bass, backing vocals
- Rina – drums, lead vocals on "Midnight City"

Other

- Mizuki Masuda (Negoto) – synthesizer and arrangement on "Mado wo Aketara"
