= Tomomi (musician) =

Japanese musician (born 1990)

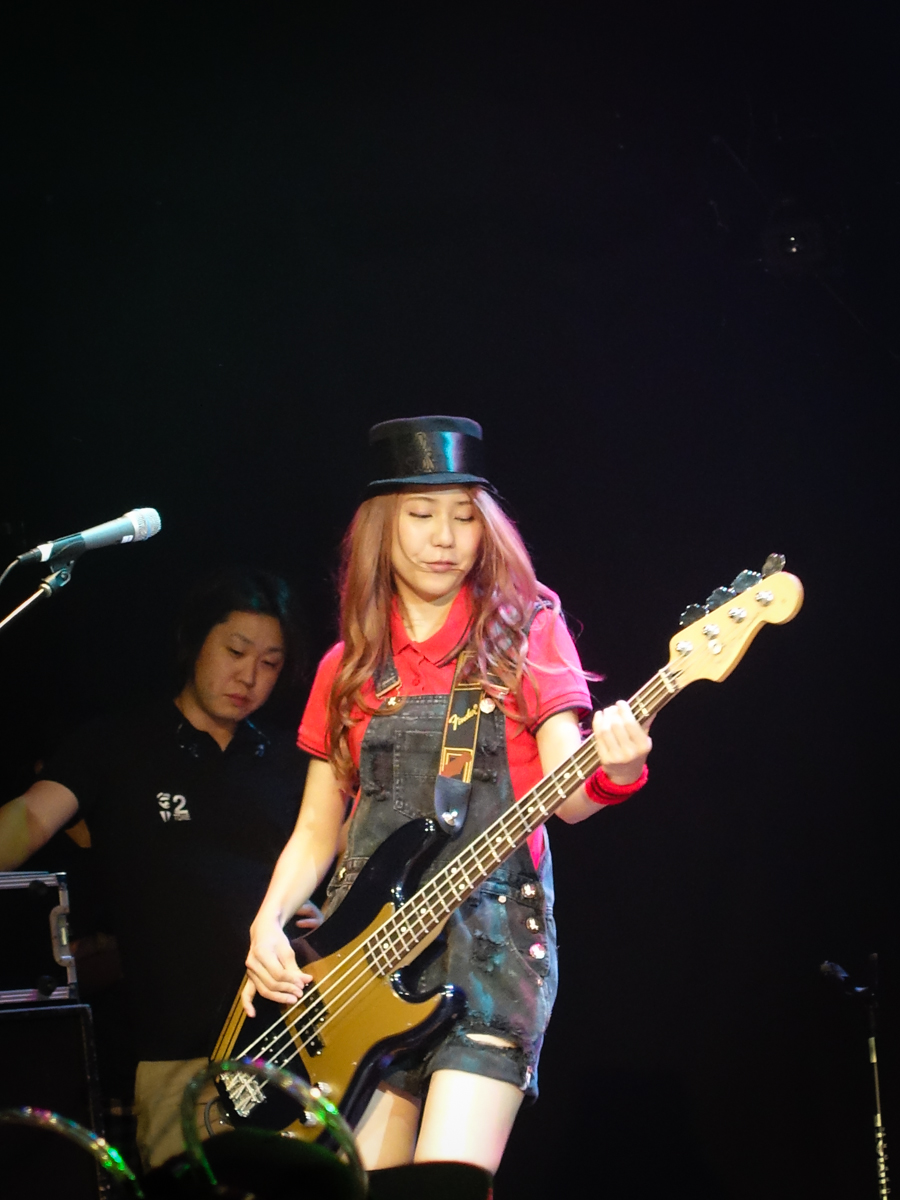
- Tomomi performing in 2015

Background information
- Born: May 31, 1990 (age 36); Hyōgo Prefecture, Japan
- Genres: Pop rock, garage rock
- Occupations: Musician, singer, songwriter
- Instruments: Bass guitar, vocals
- Years active: 2006–present
- Member of: Scandal
- Website: www.scandal-4.com

Tomomi (Japanese: トモミ; born May 31, 1990) is a Japanese musician, singer and songwriter. She is best known as bassist of the all-female rock band Scandal since 2006. She occasionally sings lead vocals, and has co-written many songs throughout the band's career.

== Early life ==
Ogawa was born in Hyōgo Prefecture and was enrolled at a talent school in Osaka named Caless. Prior to her career as a musician, she appeared along with her future bandmate Mami and singer Yuya Matsushita in a TV commercial.

== Career ==
Scandal was formed in 2006, when Tomomi was 16 years old. In 2008, they had their first releases on the independent label Kitty Records before signing to Epic Records Japan and making their major label debut with "Doll" in October of that year. They won a Newcomer Award at the 51st Japan Record Awards in 2009. Scandal performed a concert at the Nippon Budokan in March 2012, marking the fastest debut at the prestigious venue by a "girl band" in history.

Tomomi and Scandal guitarist Mami formed the rap duo Dobondobondo (どぼんどぼんど) in 2011. A music video for their song "Dobondobondo no Theme" (どぼんどぼんどのテーマ) was included on Scandal's Video Action home video released that year. The Dobondobondo song "Cherry Jam" was included on a limited edition of Scandal's 2012 single "Taiyō Scandalous". In 2016, the duo's songs "Sekapero" (セカペロ) and "Dobondobondo Dungeon" (どぼんどぼんどダンジョン) were included on different limited editions of Scandal's single "Take Me Out". A music video for "Dobondobondo Dungeon" was included on Scandal's Video Action 2 home video released later that year.

On March 11, 2014, Oricon and Fuji TV announced that Tomomi would be the new bassist of the Domoto Brothers Band, the house band that plays for the Sunday night TV musical variety show Shin Domoto Kyodai (新堂本兄弟). The show is hosted by Koichi Domoto and Tsuyoshi Domoto. Her first TV appearance with the band was on April 6, 2014.

== Discography ==
With Scandal

- Best Scandal (2009)
- Temptation Box (2010)
- Baby Action (2011)
- Queens Are Trumps: Kirifuda wa Queen (2012)
- Standard (2013)
- Hello World (2014)
- Yellow (2016)
- Honey (2018)
- Kiss from the Darkness (2020)
- Mirror (2022)
- Luminous (2024)
