= Kiss from the Darkness =

- Cover of the regular edition

Studio album by Scandal
- Released: February 12, 2020
- Recorded: 2019–2020
- Genre: Pop rock; alternative rock
- Length: 46:06
- Label: Her/Victor Entertainment; JPU (Europe)
- Producer: Scandal

Scandal chronology
Honey (2018)	Kiss from the Darkness (2020)	Mirror (2022)

Singles from Kiss from the Darkness
- 1. "Masterpiece / Mabataki" Released: March 27, 2019; 2. "Fuzzy" Released: August 7, 2019; 3. "Saishūheiki, Kimi" Released: November 5, 2019

Kiss from the Darkness is the ninth studio album by Japanese rock band Scandal. The album was released on February 12, 2020 by Victor Entertainment (VIZL-1706) in Japan and JPU Records (JPU060) in Europe and North America, featuring a total of twelve songs, including the band's first double-A-side CD single “Masterpiece” and “Mabataki”. The album peaked at number five on the weekly Oricon Albums Chart, Japan's music industry-standard popularity chart. This extended Scandal's streak of having all nine of their studio albums reach the top five of the Oricon chart upon release.

== Background ==
Kiss from the Darkness is Scandal's first album on their private record label "her". Thematically, the album is meant to reflect the band's lifestyles as both a band and as individuals, and hence features the band and its members as the protagonist in several of the songs. This is a departure from their previous albums, in which the band seldom wrote about themselves. The band paid greater attention to incorporating their personal feelings of joy, sorrow and vulnerability into the album. The band decided to take an experimental approach to the album by covering more genres and by collaborating with other Japanese musicians whom they spend personal time with, so the album could better reflect their personal selves. All the songs on the album were written and composed by themselves.

== Themes ==
"Tonight" was written while the band was on tour in 2019. Mami noted down what Haruna said to the audience during an emcee segment at one of their live performances, and turned the words into lyrics. The song is meant to depict the band's determination to continue making impactful music together. In the second volume of their "her" label magazine, it was also revealed that Mami has an interest in Buddhist sayings and deliberately included the phrase "tenchi kaibyaku", which translates to "creation of heaven and earth" into the lyrics. The song is arranged by then-16-year-old track maker Sasuke, who commented he was impressed by the band's original demo of the song and took great care not to alter its atmosphere too much. The music video was filmed in Singapore when the band visited to perform at C3 Anime Festival Asia 2019. In January 2020, the song was announced as the theme song for the Japanese drama Raise de wa Chanto Shimasu (I'll be fine in the afterlife).

"Masterpiece" is the very first single the band released after starting their private record label "her". It is a fast-paced song that starts with a heavy guitar riff, and the lyrics represent the band's candid feelings on what they consider a fresh creative start to their career since starting their private label "her". In the second volume of their "her" label magazine, the band shared that when the song was still a demo, they sang gibberish in English to fill it out, until Rina picked up the word "Masterpiece" and began to pen the lyrics from there. She then described the song as having taken extraordinarily long to complete, as there were too many thoughts and feelings they were trying to capture into a single song. "Masterpiece" was used as the opening song for every live on their Fuzzy Summer Mood tour.

"Fuzzy" is the first digital single and second single overall released from the album, although it had already been written during the time of their Honey album. It is an uptempo love song which literally describes a boyfriend who smokes. Rina, who wrote the lyrics, explained that the song taps on her own experience of wanting a special moment to not end, while still knowing deep down that the future is uncertain. This was further emphasized by titling the song "Fuzzy", which means "ambiguous" when translated into Japanese. In an interview, the band described the song as different and more "raw" than other love songs they had previously written.

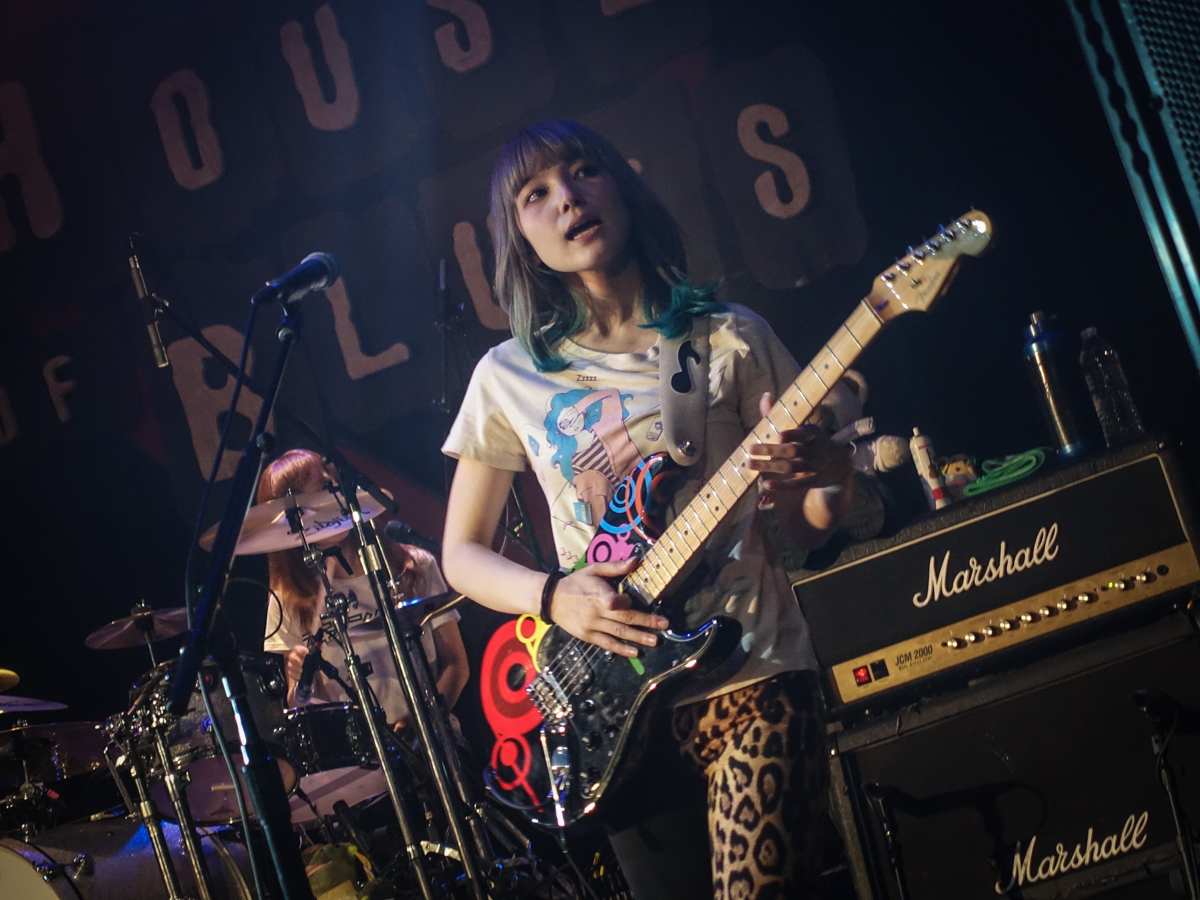
Lead guitarist Mami composed the music for all but three songs on the album.

"Saishūheiki, Kimi", which translates to "you, the ultimate weapon", is the album's second digital single and third single overall. It was described by the band as an experimental song. Mami, who wrote the music, pictured the song with a strong western image and included pistol-like sounds at the end of the demo. When Rina heard this demo, the lyrics "saishūheiki wa kimi nan da" sprang to her mind immediately and she began to pen the lyrics about living life to the best of one's ability, hence becoming the "ultimate weapon". The song is one of the few Scandal songs arranged for only one guitar (played by Mami), so Haruna can experiment with a "wilder" stage presence during live shows.

"Laundry Laundry" is the only song on the album written by Tomomi. It draws from her personal experience of forcing herself to adhere to her daily routine, such as eating meals and doing laundry, even when she is feeling down or frustrated. Tomomi is fond of and frequently listens to acoustic songs. While the band has often performed acoustic versions of their songs live, Tomomi wanted to make a song that had an acoustic arrangement from the start. She approached her friend, Yusuke Takeda of Radwimps, to help with the arrangement. The song uses a variety of instruments such as claves, cabasa, marimba and sleigh bells, some of which were played by Yusuke Takeda himself. Yusuke Takeda later commented that he had liked the sound of the original demo, and was excited to help shape the rest of the song.

"Neon Town Escape" is the only song on the album written by Haruna, and was described by Haruna as reminiscent of the "90s J-pop" genre that she is very fond of. It was arranged by Haruna's friend, Chiaki Satō, who created the atmosphere of the song by deliberately overlaying brass and wind instruments. Chiaki Satō also recommended the brass players who play for fellow Japanese band, Lucky Tapes, to play on this song, to which Haruna readily agreed as she was a fan of Lucky Tapes as well.

"Ceramic Blue" is a love song that Mami wanted to put a twist on by depicting the uneasiness and insecurities of being in love. Mami chose the word "ceramic" because she wanted something that was strong but yet could break easily to represent this insecurity. The fast pace of the song and its lyrics are meant to create a feeling of no escape. To further depict this feeling, the song immediately starts with fast singing to create the impression of breathlessness.

"Kinenbi" is described by the band as the happiest song on the album. In the second volume of their "her" label magazine, the band shared that many of their friends and relatives (including Mami's older brother) got married during the time the band was putting together their album, and told the band that they had wished there was a suitable Scandal song they could have played at their weddings. So the band decided to write a celebratory song that could be used for any occasion. The song was played on their radio show, Scandal Catch Up supported by Meiji Apollo, to commemorate Haruna's thirty-second birthday.

"Mabataki" is the other A-side single accompanying "Masterpiece". Rina wanted the song to capture her feminine worldview, and tasked Mami to instill an "80s pop" vibe in it. The band further emphasized this by filming at a bright, colourful European-style apartment and dressing in feminine vintage clothing for the music video. Mami deliberately included musical dissonance when writing the music, to provide contrast to the otherwise gentle mood of the song.

"A.M.D.K.J." is short for "amidakuji", a Japanese lottery game that the band members sometimes play among themselves to make decisions (such as which room they each would occupy when they used to live together, or which band member would perform which publicity activity). It is also the ending theme for the long-running anime GeGeGe no Kitarō, which the band members professed to be fans of when they were children. The music video was directed by Hiroshi Usui, who wanted the video to reflect the dark theme of the anime. Rina described this song as being the band's "first angry song". It was written during a time when Rina had observed that misogynistic news and media content were being carelessly downplayed by media personalities, which frustrated her and she decided to turn this frustration into lyrics. The band wrote the song with the intention of making it a staple at their live shows, hence deliberately incorporating parts that fans could sing along with them. The song was performed live for the first time at the C3 Anime Festival Asia in Singapore in 2019.

"Tsuki" is a slow ballad and the final track on the digital editions of the album. Rina, who wrote the lyrics, explained that the song was meant to describe the feeling of being able to reminisce about past memories and relationships without regret, and to being able to look forward with hope despite uncertainty of the future. To capture the feeling of a long night, Haruna deliberately dimmed the lights in her booth while she was recording during the day. She also used a handheld microphone to capture a stronger feeling of intimacy.

"You Go Girl!" is the bonus track included in all CD editions of the album. In the second volume of their "her" label magazine, the band shard that when they were experiencing a creative slump, they sat each other down and had a frank conversation about how the band and their lives were going. The next day, they wrote this song and incorporated all the things that they had talked about the day before. When they started looking for a CD-only bonus track to put on the album, they decided to pick this song as they felt it would close the album on a positive note.

== Release ==
Kiss from the Darkness was released on February 12, 2020. In addition to a regular edition, five other limited editions were also made available. Limited Edition A features a DVD with a "her" label documentary, Limited Edition B features the second volume of Scandal's "her" label magazine, the international Limited Edition from JPU Records includes English lyric translations and an English print of "her" label magazine, DVD+T-Shirt Edition features both the "her" label documentary DVD and a T-shirt with the album art, and Vinyl Edition features the album on vinyl. The cover art for all editions was done by collage artist Q-TA.

All CD editions include the bonus track "You Go Girl!". Each physical copy sold in Japan is also accompanied by a clear folder featuring one of the band members (Mami's folder can be found with copies purchased from Tower Records, Haruna's from HMV, Tomomi's from Tsutaya, and Rina's from Scandal supporting stores).

== Chart performance ==
The album peaked at number five on Japan's Oricon weekly charts, extending Scandal's streak of having all nine of their studio albums reach the top five of the charts upon release. The album also charted on iTunes in four other countries, peaking at #21, #33, #33, and #60 in Australia, United States, Canada, and France respectively.

== Track listing ==
All lyrics are written by Rina, except where noted. All music is composed and arranged by Mami, except where noted.

No.	Title	Lyrics	Music	Arrangement	Length
1.	"Tonight"	Mami		Sasuke	3:43
2.	"Masterpiece (マスターピース)"			Keita Kawaguchi	4:19
3.	"Fuzzy"				4:47
4.	"Saishūheiki, Kimi (最終兵器、君)"				3:55
5.	"Laundry Laundry (ランドリーランドリー)"	Tomomi	Tomomi	Yusuke Takeda	4:17
6.	"Neon Town Escape"	Haruna	Haruna	Chiaki Satō	4:25
7.	"Ceramic Blue (セラミックブルー)"	Mami			3:58
8.	"Kinenbi (記念日)"				4:51
9.	"Mabataki (まばたき)"		Rina		3:49
10.	"A.M.D.K.J."				3:36
11.	"Tsuki (月)"			Yusuke Tatsuzaki (Q., Ltd)	4:23
12.	"You Go Girl! (Hidden Bonus Track)"
Total length:					46:06

== Personnel ==
Scandal

- Haruna – lead vocals, rhythm guitar, claves on "Laundry Laundry", shaker on "Neon Town Escape"
- Mami – lead guitar, backing vocals, cabasa on "Laundry Laundry", glockenspiel on "Kinenbi"
- Tomomi – bass, backing vocals, lead vocals, sleigh bells and finger snap on "Laundry Laundry"
- Rina – drums, backing vocals, tambourine on "Kinenbi"

Other

- Sasuke – arranger and producer of "Tonight"
- Keita Kawaguchi – arranger of "Masterpiece"
- Yusuke Takeda (Radwimps) – arranger of "Laundry Laundry"
- Chiaki Satō – producer of "Neon Town Escape"
- Yusuke Tatsuzaki – arranger of "Tsuki"
- Daisuke Murakami – saxophone on "Neon Town Escape"
- Chankeng – trumpet on "Neon Town Escape"
- Nappi – trombone on "Neon Town Escape"
- Randy Merrill – mastering
