= Loups=Garous =

- Directed by: Junichi Fujisaku
- Written by: Midori Gotō; Sayaka Harada
- Produced by: Motoki Mukaichi; Keiji Kobayashi; Nobuyuk Tanizawa
- Music by: Scandal
- Production companies: Production I.G; TransArts
- Distributed by: Toei Company
- Release date: August 28, 2010
- Running time: 99 minutes
- Country: Japan
- Language: Japanese

Loups=Garous (ルー=ガルー, Rū=Garū) is a 2010 animated science fiction film. It was directed by Junichi Fujisaku and produced by Production I.G and TransArts. The movie was released on August 28, 2010, and features music by the rock band SCANDAL, who are also featured in the film as cameos. It is licensed in North America by Sentai Filmworks and in United Kingdom by Manga UK. It is available for purchase on DVD and Blu-ray.

== Plot ==
Based on the original novel by Natsuhiko Kyogoku, the story takes place sometime in the future. A deadly virus that has spread worldwide has drastically reduced the world's population. Now, people have to eat synthetic food made out of sunflower seeds and must avoid any physical contact whatsoever. Only community centers (once called schools) exist and people can only communicate online. However, a group of girls have pursued real contact outside of the society. When a series of brutal murders occur, it is up to them to see the dark secrets hidden in the closed-off world they live in.

== Characters ==
Hazuki Makino (牧野 葉月)
Voiced by: Kanae Oki (Japanese); Melissa Davis (English)
A 14-year-old girl who is shy and quiet but gets overly excited, which often leads to a nosebleed. She is the leader of the group and is willing to do anything to protect her team. She is one of six children adopted by a member of high society. With the help of Tsuzuki and Myao, Makino is able to escape from being killed and tries to escape the city with Kono.
Ayumi Kono (神埜 歩未)
Voiced by: Hiromi Igarashi (Japanese); Corey Hartzog (English)
An unsociable and calm person. She dislikes violence and always follows Mio's plans. She lives alone, as her sister is away on a business trip. After killing Kunugi, Kono reveals to Makino and Myao that she is the murderer, Loups=Garous. She murdered Kawabata and Nakamura. After killing Suzuki, Kono is not seen again. Ayumi is mistakenly referred to as a "he" in Sentai Filmworks' English dub.
Mio Tsuzuki (都築 美緒)
Voiced by: Marina Inoue (Japanese); Hilary Haag (English)
The computer hacker of the group. She is a young genius who calls herself a magician. A very cheerful and sociable girl who tries to get Hazuki to be more open. Tsuzuki is presumably dead when a bomb is thrown into her house. She assists Makino in escaping when two police officers lock Makino in her house and attempt to kill her. Tsuzuki reveals herself to be alive as she hid in a protective rag doll machine, protecting herself from the explosion. She hacks into the SVC police system and shuts down the parole robots.
Myao Rei (麗 猫)
Voiced by: Miyuki Sawashiro (Japanese); Luci Christian (English)
A Chinese girl who is the oldest of the group. She is usually seen in Chinese dress and is good at kenpo. She likes cats. Myao is blamed for the murder of Yabe and Nakamura.
Yuko Yabe (矢部 祐子)
Voiced by: Kana Uetake (Japanese); Serena Varghese (English)
A pink haired and eyed girl who is good at drawing. But has low cognitive awareness, as she cannot distinguish between paintings and photographs. Yabe is killed when the groups' plan to hand her over to the police goes wrong.
Ryu Kawabata (川端 リュウ)
Voiced by: Manabu Sakamaki
A 16-year-old boy who is an anime otaku and one of the conspirers behind the murders.
Yuji Nakamura (中村 雄二)
Voiced by: Kiyoshi Katsunuma
Kawabata's classmate who is also an anime otaku and also one of the conspirers behind the murders.
Shizue Fuwa (不破 静枝)
Voiced by: Eriko Hirata (Japanese); Shelley Calene-Black (English)
She monitors Hazuki's class on their mental and living conditions. Her mother was supposedly the serial killer who committed murders four years ago, but was actually trying to find out about it. She has OCD where she rubs wet paper, but hates the antiseptic smell of wet paper. After Yabe is murdered, Kono goes to warn Fuwa that Makino and Tsuzuki are next.
Touji Kunugi (橡 兜次)
Voiced by: Kunihiro Kawamoto (Japanese); David Matranga (English)
A 40-year-old detective working on the case of the mysterious murders. He is divorced. Kono slits his throat after figuring out Kunugi was a part of the murders.
Riichiro Ishida (石田 理一郎)
Voiced by: Yutaka Aoyama (Japanese); Andy McAvin (English)
Another detective working on the case, he is also the great-grandchild of Keitaro Suzuki the founder of SVC. Has a major influential political and business background. Suzuki reveals to the group that Ishida was a made up person to hide his real face. He also reveals that he murdered those girls to fulfill his lust for the taste of real meat and cannibalizes the victims by eating their internal organs. After planning to eat Makino, Kono stabs Suzuki and kills him.
