= Comic World =

Anime convention in South Korea, Hong Kong, and Taiwan

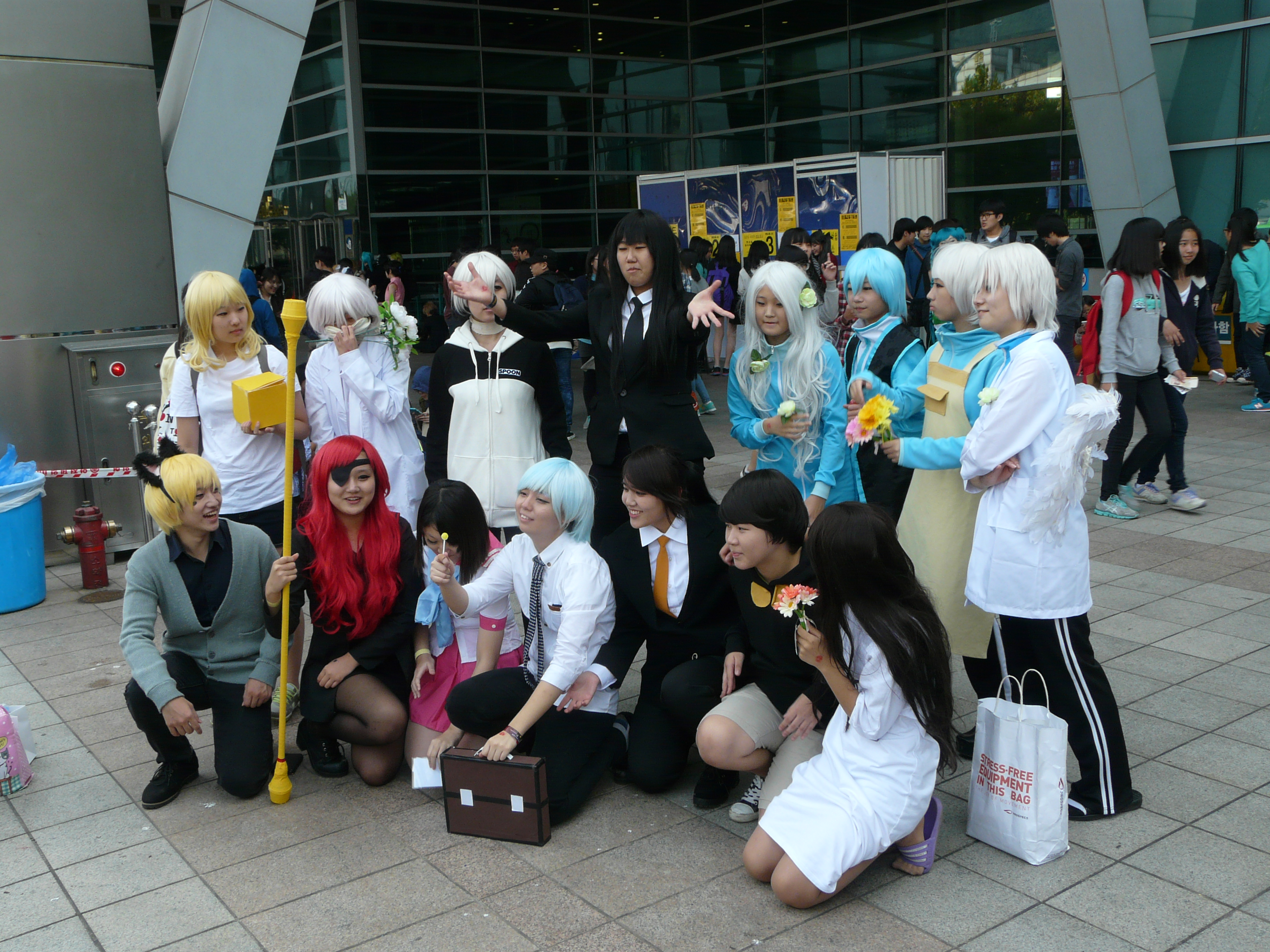
Cosplayers at Comic World Seoul, October 2013

Comic World is an anime convention that is held in South Korea, Hong Kong, and Taiwan. It is organized by S.E.Techno.

== South Korea ==
Because there are few amateur circle conventions in Korea, this convention is considered to be not only the biggest anime convention, but also the Comiket of Korea. Along with ACA festival, it is one of the top anime conventions in Korea. Comic World is held in Seoul and Busan. It used to be held at Daegu, however Daegu Comic World has been on hiatus since its 6th convention.

Comic World was first held in May 1999 and boasts the largest number of circles and visitors compared to any other anime conventions in Korea.

It provides exhibition booths, item lockers, and a dressing room for its attendees. It also allows visitors to participate in various activities such as illustration and cosplay contests, singing competitions, and a chance to speak with one's favorite manhwa artists.

Currently, Seoul Comic World is held once a month and Busan Comic World once every two months.

Unlike ACA festival and CAN festival which started strictly as a place for amateur artists to gather, Comic World was created with financial profit in mind. Because of this, it has frequent, large events and quickly gained mass popularity. Comic World allows circles to reserve a booth at the end of a previous Comic World festival, and the reservations usually fill up in one day, evidencing its popularity.

== See also ==
- Animation-Comic-Game Hong Kong
