= Mirror (Scandal album) =

- cover of the regular edition

Studio album by Scandal
- Released: January 26, 2022
- Recorded: 2020–2021
- Genre: Pop rock; alternative rock
- Length: 49:01
- Label: Her/Victor Entertainment
- Producer: Scandal

Scandal chronology
Kiss from the Darkness (2020)	Mirror (2022)

Singles from Mirror
- 1. "Eternal" Released: March 3, 2021; 2. "Ivory" Released: June 16, 2021; 3. "One More Time" Released: September 29, 2021

Mirror (stylized in all caps as MIRROR) is the tenth studio album by Japanese rock band Scandal. The album was released on January 26, 2022, by Victor Entertainment in Japan and JPU Records in Europe and North America. It features a total of ten songs, including "Living in the City" and "Spice" as CD Bonus Tracks. The album peaked at number five on the weekly Oricon Albums Chart. This extended Scandal's streak of having all ten of their studio albums reach the top five of the chart upon release.

== Background ==
Mirror is Scandal's second album on their private record label "her". The album features 10 songs in total, including the single songs released this year: "Eternal", "Ivory", and "One More Time".

Four editions were planned: Regular (CD only), Limited Edition A (CD+DVD), Limited Edition B (CD+Magazine), DVD+Merch (CD+DVD+Merch in a box).

== Release ==
Mirror was released on January 26, 2022. In addition to a regular edition, five other limited editions were also made available. Limited Edition A features Scandal Documentary "her" Diary 2021 Special Edition, Limited Edition B features the third volume of Scandal's "her" label magazine, the international Limited Edition from JPU Records was released on March 4, 2021, which includes English lyric translations and an English print of "her" label magazine, DVD+T-shirt Edition features both the documentary with English subtitles DVD and a T-shirt with the album artwork.

Each physical copy sold in Japan was also accompanied by a clear folder featuring one of the band members (Mami's folder can be found with copies purchased from Tower Records, Haruna's from HMV, Tomomi's from Tsutaya, and Rina's from Scandal supporting stores).

== Chart performance ==
The album peaked at number five on Japan's Oricon weekly charts, extending Scandal's streak of having all ten of their studio albums reach the top five of the charts upon release. The album also charted on iTunes peaking at #6 in Japan.

== Track listing ==
No.	Title	Lyrics	Music	Length
1.	"Mirror"	Rina	Mami	3:45
2.	"Eternal"	Rina	Mami, Satori Shiraishi	3:41
3.	"Ai ni Naranakatta no sa" (愛にならなかったのさ; It Didn't Turn Out to Be True Love)	Mami	Mami, Kouhei Munemoto	4:17
4.	"Kanojo wa Wave" (彼女はWave; She is a Wave)	Rina	Rina	3:25
5.	"Ai no Shoutai" (愛の正体; Love's True Colors)	Tomomi	Tomomi, Satori Shiraishi	4:25
6.	"Ivory" (アイボリー)	Mami	Mami, Kouhei Munemoto	4:21
7.	"Yuugure, Tokeru" (夕暮れ、溶ける; Dusk is Melting)	Haruna	Haruna, Hibiki Nishikawa	4:00
8.	"Ao no Naru Yoru no Sukima de" (蒼の鳴る夜の隙間で; In the Gaps of the Blue, Echoing Night)	Rina	Rina, Hibiki Nishikawa	3:14
9.	"Prism" (プリズム)	Rina	Tomomi, Kouhei Munemoto	4:02
10.	"One More Time"	Rina	Mami, Yuta Hashimoto	4:08
11.	"Living in the City" (CD Bonus Track)	Tomomi	Tomomi	5:06
12.	"Spice" (CD Bonus Track)	Rina	Mami	3:44
Total length:				49:01

== Personnel ==
Scandal

- Haruna – lead vocals, rhythm guitar
- Mami – lead guitar, backing vocals, lead vocals on "Ivory"
- Tomomi – bass, backing vocals, lead vocals on "Ai no Shoutai" and "Living in the City"
- Rina – drums, backing vocals, lead vocals on "Kanojo wa Wave"

Other

- Satori Shiraishi – arranger of "Eternal" and "Ai No Shoutai"
- Kouhei Munemoto – arranger of "Ai ni Naranakatta no sa", "Ivory" and "Prism"
- Hibiki Nishikawa – arranger of "Yuugure, Tokeru" and "Ao no Naru Yoru no Sukima de"
- Yuta Hashimoto – arranger of "One More Time"
