= Yellow (Scandal album) =

Studio album by Scandal
- Released: March 2, 2016
- Recorded: 2015–2016
- Genre: Pop rock; alternative rock
- Length: 52:04
- Language: Japanese
- Label: Epic Japan; JPU (Europe)
- Producer: Scandal

Scandal chronology
Hello World (2014)	Yellow (2016)	Honey (2018)

Singles from Yellow
- 1. "Stamp!" Released: July 22, 2015; 2. "Sisters" Released: September 9, 2015

Yellow is the seventh studio album by Japanese rock band Scandal. The album was released on March 2, 2016, and debuted at No. 2 on the Oricon and Billboard Japan weekly charts.

== Track listing ==
All music is composed by Mami, except where noted.

No.	Title	Lyrics	Music	Arrangement	Length
1.	"Room No. 7"	instrumental		SCANDAL; Satori Shiraishi	1:42
2.	"Stamp!"	Mami		Kenji Tamai; Masahiro Tobinai	4:25
3.	"Love Me Do"	Mami		Shiraishi	3:49
4.	"Morning Sun"	Rina		Shiraishi	4:12
5.	"Sunday Drive"	Tomomi	SCANDAL	SCANDAL	4:03
6.	"Konya wa Pizza Party" (今夜はピザパーティー; Pizza-Party Tonight)	Tomomi		Shiraishi	3:32
7.	"Heaven na Kibun" (ヘブンな気分; Heaven-like Feelings)	Rina		SCANDAL	4:43
8.	"Suki-Suki"	Mami		Keita Kawaguchi	4:47
9.	"Love"	Tomomi	Tomomi	Shiraishi	4:45
10.	"Sisters"	Rina		Tamai; Rui Momota	4:10
11.	"Happy Birthday"	Rina		SCANDAL	3:42
12.	"Chiisana Honoō" (ちいさなほのお; Little Flame)	Rina		Kawaguchi	4:27
13.	"Your Song -English ver.-" (Bonus track)	SCANDAL	SCANDAL	Kawaguchi	3:44

Special Edition DVD
No.	Title	Length
1.	"Yellow Opening Movie "Room No. 7""	1:42
2.	"Yellow Opening Movie "Room No. 7" - Making clip -"	11:16

== Personnel ==
- HARUNA (Haruna Ono) - lead vocals, rhythm guitar
- MAMI (Mami Sasazaki) - lead guitar, vocals
- TOMOMI (Tomomi Ogawa) - bass, vocals
- RINA (Rina Suzuki) - drums, vocals
