= Standard (Scandal album) =

Studio album by Scandal
- Released: October 2, 2013
- Recorded: 2013
- Genre: Alternative rock; pop rock
- Length: 53:42
- Language: Japanese, English
- Label: Epic Records Japan

Scandal chronology
Queens Are Trumps: Kirifuda wa Queen (2012)	Standard (2013)	Hello World (2014)

Singles from Standard
- 1. "Awanai Tsumori no, Genki de ne" Released: May 22, 2013; 2. "Kagen no Tsuki" Released: August 14, 2013; 3. "Over Drive" Released: September 18, 2013

Standard is the fifth studio album by Japanese pop rock band, Scandal. The album was released on October 2, 2013 by Epic Records Japan. It is available in three different editions, Complete Production, Limited and Regular. The Complete Production Edition came with a T-shirt, while the Limited Edition came with a DVD including the music videos for "Awanai Tsumori no, Genki de ne", "Kagen no Tsuki", and "Scandal in the House".

== Track listing ==
No.	Title	Lyrics	Music	Arrangement	Length
1.	"Brand New Wave"	Tomomi, Tomokazu Yamada	Yamada	Keita Kawaguchi	3:35
2.	"Over Drive"	Yasutaka Nakata	Nakata	Nakata, Nishi-ken	5:04
3.	"Uchiagehanabi" (打ち上げ花火; Skyrocket)	Noriyasu Isshiki	Isshiki, Satori Shiraishi	Shiraishi	4:47
4.	"Orange Juice" (オレンジジュース)	Tomomi, Yuichi Tajika	Tajika	Kawaguchi	4:48
5.	"Metronome" (メトロノーム)	Takashi Yamaguchi	Yamaguchi	Kawaguchi	4:02
6.	"Weather report"	Rina, Hibiki Nishikawa	Nishikawa	Nishikawa	3:41
7.	"Hachigatsu" (8月; August)	Haruna	Mami	Nishikawa	4:15
8.	"Awanai Tsumori no, Genki de ne" (会わないつもりの、元気でね; I Don't Plan On Seeing You; Take Care)	Ryota Yanagisawa	Yanagisawa	Kawaguchi	4:25
9.	"Kagen no Tsuki" (下弦の月; Waning Moon)	Yamaguchi	Yamaguchi	Yamaguchi	3:38
10.	"Koi no Gestalt Houkai" (恋のゲシュタルト崩壊; The Collapse of Love's Gestalt)	Rina	Rina, Hajimetal	A×S×E	4:02
11.	"Kimi to Mirai to Kanzen Douki" (キミと未来と完全同期; Fully Synchronized with You and the Future)	Tomomi	Atsushi	Atsushi	4:37
12.	"Namida yo Hikare" (涙よ光れ; Shining Tears)	Mami, Hidenori Tanaka	Tanaka	Shiraishi	3:30
13.	"Standard"	SCANDAL	Mami	SCANDAL	3:18

DVD Edition bonus videos
No.	Title	Length
1.	"Awanai Tsumori no Genki de ne" (Music video)
2.	"Kagen no Tsuki" (Music video)
3.	"Scandal in the House" (Music video)

== Personnel ==
- HARUNA (Haruna Ono) - lead vocals, rhythm guitar
- MAMI (Mami Sasazaki) - lead guitar, vocals
- TOMOMI (Tomomi Ogawa) - bass, vocals
- RINA (Rina Suzuki) - drums, vocals
