= Animation-Comic-Game Hong Kong =

Entertainment convention in Hong Kong

- Traditional Chinese: 香港動漫電玩節
- Simplified Chinese: 香港动漫电玩节
Transcriptions
Standard Mandarin
- Hanyu Pinyin: Xiānggǎng Dòngmàn Diànwán Jié
Yue: Cantonese
- Jyutping: hoeng1 gong2 dung6 maan6 din6 waan4 zit3

Logo of ACGHK

Animation-Comic-Game Hong Kong (ACGHK, Chinese: 香港動漫電玩節) is a material-entertainment fair and book fair focusing on animations, manga, and games and related products. First held in Hong Kong in 1999, the fair takes place annually at the Hong Kong Convention and Exhibition Centre usually around August. The categories of products and services exhibited and sold in ACGHK have steadily expanded over the years.

== History ==
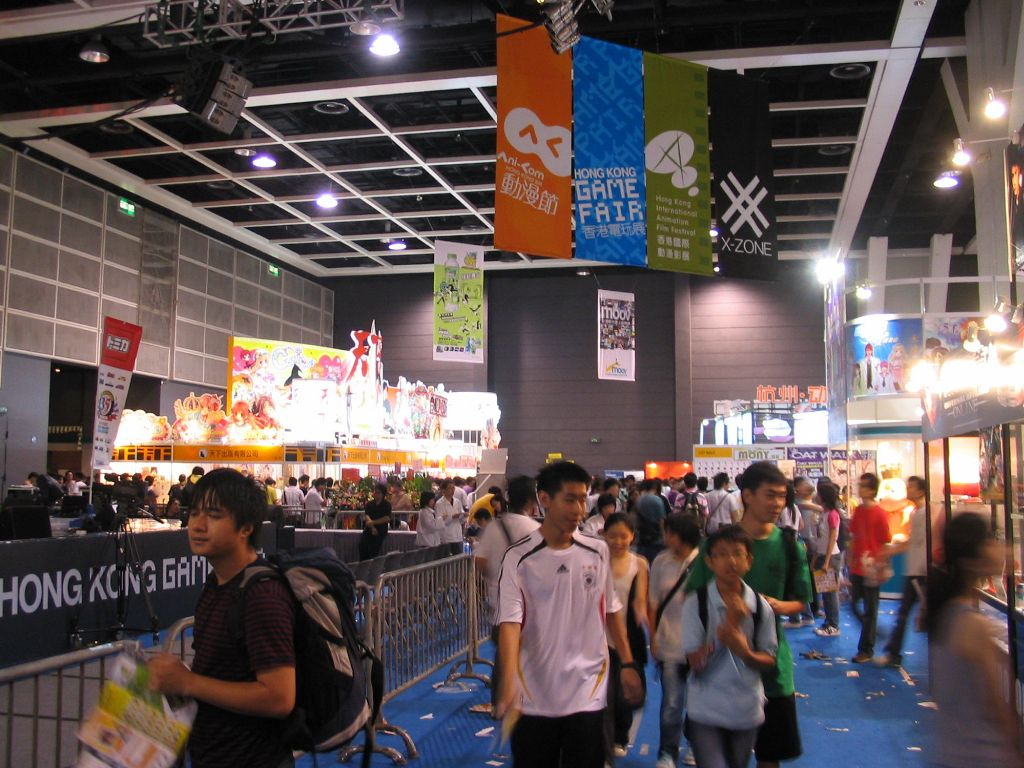
Ani-Com convention

The fair was previously called Hong Kong Comics Festival (香港漫畫節). In 2004 the convention was sponsored by Animax Hong Kong, and was called the 2004 Animax Summer FUNtasy.

Since 2006, Hong Kong Comics Festival had been renamed as Ani-Com Hong Kong (香港動漫節) and was held with Hong Kong Game Fair (香港電玩展) together.

Animation-Comic-Game Hong Kong (ACGHK, traditional Chinese: 香港動漫電玩節) is the merging of Ani-Com Hong Kong (香港動漫節) and Hong Kong Game Fair (香港電玩展) since 2008. ACGHK is a material-entertainment fair and book fair focusing on animations, manhua (Chinese comics) and games in Hong Kong. It is held annually at the Hong Kong Convention and Exhibition Centre usually around August.

== Events and conventions ==
Other than comics, the convention also sells products related to comics, anime, and video games; these sales are hugely profitable as most of them are limited-edition products that attract teenagers to start queuing up overnight or even a day or two before.

The convention also features shows, cosplay, and dance/gaming competitions. The annual Hong Kong Game Fair is held in conjunction with the comics festival. Companies such as Microsoft's Xbox have large kiosks and displays in the show. In the Samsung Game Girl competition, 11 girls compete for the "Game Girl" title; winners end up entering entertainment or modeling, becoming famous in an extremely short time. Because the exhibition is extremely crowded, large corporations purchase accident insurance and hire extra security for their top models.

In 2010 the convention took place on July 30–August 3 at the HKCEC. The convention will also take place in Guangzhou, China, from October 2–6, during China's weeklong National Day of the People's Republic of China holiday.

https://web.archive.org/web/20100820204138/http://www.ani-com.hk/pdf2010/exhibitors.pdf

== Performers ==
- 2009 – Shoko Nakagawa, Arisa Noto (能登有沙)
- 2010 – Mr., 謝安琪, 關楚耀, 謝慧玲舞蹈學院. MC Jin, 官恩娜, 高海寧, Khole Chu, Shina, Puffy, Castle, Fundanjuku, Haze, SCANDAL

== See also ==
- Comic World
- Manhua
