= Hello World (Scandal album) =

Studio album by Scandal
- Released: December 3, 2014
- Genre: Alternative rock; pop rock
- Length: 53:28
- Language: Japanese
- Label: Epic Records Japan; JPU (UK, EU)
- Producer: Scandal

Scandal chronology
Standard (2013)	Hello World (2014)	Yellow (2016)

Singles from Hello World
- 1. "Runners High" Released: February 12, 2014; 2. "Departure" Released: April 23, 2014; 3. "Yoake no Ryuuseigun" Released: July 16, 2014; 4. "Image" Released: November 19, 2014

Hello World is the sixth studio album by Japanese pop rock band, Scandal. The album was released on December 3, 2014, in Japan by Epic and being distributed in Europe through JPU Records. Hello World debuted at #3 on the Oricon chart, selling over 35,000 copies in its first week. It also reached the top spot of the Canadian iTunes Store's World Music Chart.

== Track listing ==
No.	Title	Lyrics	Music	Arrangement	Length
1.	"Image"	Mami	Mami	Keita Kawaguchi	4:26
2.	"Your Song"	SCANDAL	SCANDAL	Kawaguchi	3:43
3.	"Love in Action"	Mami	Mami	Kawaguchi	3:22
4.	"Departure"	Mami	Mami	Seiji Kameda	4:40
5.	"Graduation" (Haruna solo)	Haruna	Haruna	Atsushi	4:23
6.	"Yoake no Ryuuseigun" (夜明けの流星群; A Meteor Shower at Dawn)	Tomomi, Hidenori Tanaka	Tanaka	Kameda	4:41
7.	"Onegai Navigation" (お願いナビゲーション; Navigation Please)	Rina	Mami	Mami	3:00
8.	"Runners High"	Haruna	Yuichi Tajika	Yu Odakura	3:55
9.	"Hon wo Yomu" (本を読む; Read a Book, Mami solo)	Mami	Mami	Mami	3:34
10.	"Kan Beer" (缶ビール; Canned Beer, Tomomi solo)	Tomomi	Tomomi	Kawaguchi	4:01
11.	"Winter Story"	Rina	Mami, Rina	Satori Shiraishi	3:41
12.	"Oyasumi" (おやすみ; Goodnight, Rina solo)	Rina	Rina	Kawaguchi	4:38
13.	"Place of Life" (feat. Tetsuya Komuro)	Tetsuya Komuro, SCANDAL	Komuro	Kawaguchi	5:14

European CD Edition bonus tracks
No.	Title	Lyrics	Music	Length
14.	"Rainy"	Rina	SCANDAL	3:51
15.	"Nai Nai Night 2014" (ないないNight 2014; No No Night 2014)	Tomomi	Tomomi	2:45
Total length:				59:44

DVD Edition
No.	Title	Length
1.	"Scandal Talking about "Hello World""	51:25

== Charts ==
Album
Country	Chart	Peak position
Japan	Oricon Daily Album Chart	2
Japan	Oricon Weekly Album Chart	3
Japan	Oricon Monthly Album Chart	10
Japan	Oricon Yearly Album Chart	153
Japan	SoundScan Album Chart (CD+DVD)	4
Japan	SoundScan Album Chart (CD+T-shirt)	11
Japan	Billboard Japan Top Albums	4
South-Korea	Gaon International Album Chart	32
Canada	iTunes Store Top Albums (World Music)	1
Singles
Song	Chart	Peak position
Runners High
Runners High	Oricon	5
Runners High	Billboard Japan Hot 100	76
Departure
Departure	Oricon	5
Departure	Billboard Japan Hot 100	3
Yoake no Ryuuseigun
Yoake no Ryuuseigun	Oricon	5
Yoake no Ryuuseigun	Billboard Japan Hot 100	3
Yoake no Ryuuseigun	RTHK J-pop Chart (Hong Kong)	1
Image
Image	Oricon	14
Image	Billboard Japan Hot 100	14
Image	RTHK J-pop Chart (Hong Kong)	1

== Personnel ==
Scandal

- Haruna Ono — vocal, guitar (1–11, 13–15), güiró (15), lyrics (5, 8), music (5)
- Mami Sasazaki — vocal, guitar (1–11, 13), synth, recorder (15), lyrics (1, 3, 4, 9), music (1, 3, 4, 9, 11), arrangements (7, 9)
- Tomomi Ogawa — vocal, bass (1–15), lyrics (6, 10, 15), tambourine (15), music (10, 15)
- Rina Suzuki — vocal, drums (1–15), guitar (12), cajón (15), lyrics (7, 11, 12, 14), music (11, 12)

Contributing musicians

- Tetsuya Komuro — synth (13)
- Eisuke Taga — slide whistle (15)

Post-production

- Executive producer: Shunsuke Muramatsu, Satoshi Aoki (Epic Records Japan), Yūichi Orimoto (Kitty Entertainment Ltd.)
- Mastered by: Yūji Chinone (Sony Music Studios Tokyo)
- Arrangements: Keita Kawaguchi (1, 2, 10, 12, 13), Seiji Kameda (4, 6), Atsushi (5), Yū Odakura (8), Satori Shiraishi (11)
- Additional arrangements: Keita Kawaguchi (3, 7, 9)
- Mix engineer: Keita Yoko (1–3, 5, 7, 9–12), Eiji "Q" Makino (4, 6), Uni Inoue (8), Jan Fairchild (13)
- Instrumental technician: Bunta Mochizuki, Kōta Oda (Sound Crew)

Packaging

- Art direction: Yūji Takao (Kannana Graphic)
- Coordinarion: Kōichi Yamatani (Kannana Graphic)
- Design: Sayuri Kamata (Kannana Graphic)
- Photography: Hirohisa Nakano
- Styling: Kyōhei Ogawa
- Hair & make-up: Hirokazu Niwa, Kazuhiro Sugimoto (maroonbrand)
- Set design: Chihiro Matsumoto (Art Breakers)

Epic Records Japan Staff

- A&R director: Akito Ogawa
- A&R promotion: Yuriko Konya
- A&R producer: Sen Okada, Ikuko Yamaguchi
- A&R assistant: Shingo Shinkawa
- Media promotion: Mayuko Isebō, Akihito Muraki, Rie Ikeda, Masaki Inoue, Akiko Itō, Akira Morikawa
- Area promotion: Akiko Satō, Nozomi Takahama, Yūichirō Hisaizumi, Takako Yamamoto, Shōta Aoyama, Junichirō Kumahara
- Planning Supervisor: Ikuo Hayashi
- Label Administration: Kumiko Sugita, Miki Takashima, Satomi Mizusawa, Haruna Takizawa

Kitty Entertainment Ltd. Staff

- Sound director: Taichi Ōhira
- Manager: Taga Eisuke, Arisa Yamamoto
- Concert creative: Fumihiko Tsuchiya, Mikako Ogura
- Artist promotion: Ayano Takahashi, Kyōko Shioji
- Merchandise: Hiroshi Aihara, Erina Fujii, Hibari Sakai
- Special adviser: Hidenori Taga, Yoshihisa Nagata

Sony Music Group Staff

- Sales promotion: Hiromi Kanehira, Dai Sugamata, Chie Arai, Minami Kodama (Sony Music Marketing)
- Web promotion: Takuya Ishikawa, Sayaka Tsuji (Sony Music Marketing)
- International promotion: Ken Isayama, Akira Shiota (Sony Music Entertainment)
- Music publishing: Ei Ōsaka, Niina Yasui (Sony Music Publishing)
- Business affairs: Hitomi Takano, Momoko Hakata (Sony Music Entertainment)
- Products co-ordination: Chiho Sugiyama (Sony Music Communications)

JPU Records Staff

- Sales and Physical Distribution: Ben Farrar, Tim Chilton
- Marketing and promotion: Tom Smith
- Coordination: Tom Smith
