= Queens Are Trumps: Kirifuda wa Queen =

Queens Are Trumps -Kirifuda wa Queen-

Studio album by Scandal
- Released: September 26, 2012
- Genre: Alternative rock; pop rock
- Length: 54:35
- Language: Japanese, English
- Label: Epic Records Japan

Scandal chronology
Baby Action (2011)	Queens Are Trumps -Kirifuda wa Queen- (2012)	Standard (2013)

Singles from Queens are trumps -Kirifuda wa Queen-
- 1. "Harukaze" Released: February 22, 2012; 2. "Taiyō Scandalous" Released: July 11, 2012; 3. "Pin Heel Surfer" Released: September 12, 2012

Queens Are Trumps: Kirifuda wa Queen (Queens are trumps -切り札はクイーン-) is the fourth studio album by Japanese pop rock band, Scandal. The album was released on September 26, 2012 by Epic. It is available in three different editions, a limited CD+DVD version, a regular CD Only version, and a limited CD+Photobook edition. The album reached #4 on the Oricon weekly charts and charted for 12 weeks.

"Welcome home" was used as the theme song for the TV program Mizu to Midori no Campaign.

== Track listing ==
No.	Title	Lyrics	Music	Arrangement	Length
1.	"Queens Are Trumps"	Mami	Bu-Ni	Bu-Ni	3:41
2.	"Taiyou Scandalous" (太陽スキャンダラス; Scandalous Sun)	Haruna, Naoto	Naoto	Naoto	5:09
3.	"Pin Heel Surfer" (ピンヒールサーファー)	Shō Wada	Wada	Wada	5:04
4.	"Rock’n Roll"	Haruna, Tomomi, Yuichi Tajika	Tajika	Atsushi	3:54
5.	"Bitter Chocolate" (ビターチョコレート)	Rina	Tomomi	Keita Kawaguchi	5:16
6.	"Kill the Virgin"	Hajimetal, Jun Sato	Hajimetal	Hajimetal	5:01
7.	"Koe" (声; Voice)	Ryota Yanagisawa	Yanagisawa	Kawaguchi	4:50
8.	"Rising Star"	Haruna, Tomohiro Okubo	Okubo	Atsushi	3:32
9.	"Bright"	Rina, Tajika	Tajika	Kawaguchi	5:17
10.	"Welcome Home"	Yuka Kawamura	Kawamura	Okubo	4:00
11.	"Harukaze" (春風; Spring Breeze)	SCANDAL, Isshiki Noriyasu	Noriyasu	Atsushi	4:38
12.	"Right Here"	Jamil	Jamil, Satoshi Shiraishi	Shiraishi	4:13

DVD Edition bonus videos
No.	Title	Length
1.	"Almond Crush "Koi no Hajimari wa Diet"" (アーモンドクラッシュ 「恋の始まりはダイエット」)
2.	"Dobondobondo "Cherry Jam"" (どぼんどぼんど 「ちぇりーじゃむ」)
3.	"Jacket Cover Photoshoot Making-of"
4.	"Taiyou Scandalous wo 100-bai Tanoshimu Dance" (太陽スキャンダラスを100倍楽しむダンス)

== Personnel ==
- HARUNA (Haruna Ono) - lead vocals, rhythm guitar
- MAMI (Mami Sasazaki) - lead guitar, lead vocals on track 7, backing vocals
- TOMOMI (Tomomi Ogawa) - bass, lead and backing vocals
- RINA (Rina Suzuki) - drums, backing vocals

Guest musicians

- Yoshio Nomura - lead guitar on track 1
- Yūzō Ōkusu - synthesizer
- Hirohito Furui - synthesizer
- Akira Onozuka - piano
- Kazuta Katsuki - saxophone
- Watanabe Fire - saxophone
- Shin Kazuhara - trumpet
- Sirō Sasaki - trumpet
- Azusa Tōjō - trombone
- Matarō Misawa - percussions
- Yuki Okazaki - chorus
- Yūichi Ikusawa - chorus
