= Chiaki Satō =

Japanese actress and musician

- Born: September 20, 1988 (age 37); Iwate, Japan
- Years active: 2005–present

Chiaki Satō (佐藤 千亜妃, Satō Chiaki; born September 20, 1988) is a Japanese actress and musician. She was the vocalist and guitarist for the band Kinoko Teikoku. She was born in Iwate Prefecture, and attended the private Yakumo Gakuen High School in Tokyo.

== Filmography ==
=== Film ===
- Hōtai Club (2007)
- Cast: (2019)
- Ghost Cat Anzu (2024)

=== Drama ===
- Seito Shokun! (2007)
- Joshi Ana Icchokusen! (2007)
- Honto ni Atta Kowai Hanashi (2006)
- My Boss My Hero (2006)
- Chichi ni Kanaderu Melody (2005)
- Akai Unmei (2005)
- Chakushin ari (2005)
- Aozora Koi Hoshi (2005)

== Discography ==
=== Albums ===
- Planet (2019) No. 38 Japan
- Koe (2021)
- Butterfly Effect (2023)

=== Extended plays ===
- SickSickSickSick (2018)

== Award ==
- 29th HoriPro Talent Scout Campaign Grand Prix Award (2004)

== Sources ==
- http://www.jdorama.com/artiste.2526.htm
- https://web.archive.org/web/20080406084805/http://www.tokyograph.com/info/Chiaki_Sato
