= Doll (song) =

Single by Scandal

from the album Best Scandal
- Released: October 22, 2008
- Genre: J-pop; hard rock
- Length: 3:28
- Label: Epic
- Songwriter(s): Tomomi Ogawa, Satoshi Tokita

Scandal singles chronology
"Kagerō" (2008)	"Doll" (2008)	"Sakura Goodbye" (2009)

Music video
- "Doll" on YouTube

"Doll" is a Japanese-language song by girl pop rock band Scandal. It was the major debut single (fourth overall) released by the band, released in two versions: a limited CD+DVD edition and a regular CD-only edition. The title track was used as the October and November 2008 opening theme for TBS's "Rank Oukoku", as well as the October 2008 ending theme for Tokyo MX's "Break Poing". The single reached #26 on the Oricon weekly chart and charted for five weeks, selling 12,572 copies. The DVD includes the karaoke PV for "Doll" with cheers from Scandal. It was certified gold by the RIAJ for selling over 100,000 digital copies in January 2017.

== Track listing ==
=== CD ===
CD (ESCL-3142 / ESCL-3140)
No.	Title	Lyrics	Music	Length
1.	"Doll"	TOMOMI	Satoshi Tokita	3:28
2.	"S.L.Magic"	RINA	MASTERWORKS	4:17
3.	"Doll (Instrumental)"	—	Satoshi Tokita	3:28
Total length:				11:07

=== DVD ===
DVD (ESCL-3141)
No.	Title	Length
1.	"Doll music clip"	3:28
