= 51st Japan Record Awards =

2009 Japanese music awards ceremony

- Date: December 30, 2009
- Venue: New National Theatre, Tokyo
- Hosted by: Masaaki Sakai, Norika Fujiwara

Television/radio coverage
- Network: TBS

The 51st Annual Japan Record Awards took place on December 30, 2009. TBS broadcast the event, which will take place again at New National Theatre in Shibuya, Tokyo. The nominations for the Awards were announced on December 1.

== Awards winners ==
- Japan Record Award: - "Someday"
  - Artist: Exile
  - Songwriter: ATSUSHI
  - Composer: miwa furuse
  - Arranger: H-Wonder
  - Record companies: Avex Entertainment
  - Productions: LDH
- Best Vocal Performance: Hiroshi Itsuki
- Best New Artist: Big Bang
- Best album: GReeeeN for "Shio, Koshō"

== Nominees ==
=== Japan Record Awards ===
- Ikimono-gakari for "YELL"
- w-inds. x G-Dragon (Big Bang) for "Rain Is Fallin'"
- Exile for "Someday"
- Girl Next Door for "Infinity"
- Daisuke Kitagawa for "Omae o Tsurete (おまえを連れて)"
- Kumi Koda for "Lick me♥"
- Fuyumi Sakamoto for "Mata Kimi ni Koishiteru (また君に恋してる)"
- Tohoshinki for "Stand by U"
- Kiyoshi Hikawa for "Tokimeki no Rumba (ときめきのルンバ)"
- Ryoichi Higuchi for "Tegami: Shin'ai naru Kodomotachi e (手紙〜親愛なる子供たちへ〜)"
- Kaori Mizumori for "Aki no Miyajima (安芸の宮島)"

=== Best New Artist ===
- Maya Sakura
- Scandal
- Big Bang
- Hilcrhyme

== Special awards ==
- Alice
- AKB48 and Yasushi Akimoto
- Nobuyuki Tsujii
- Michael Jackson

== See also ==
- 60th NHK Kōhaku Uta Gassen
