= Scandal discography =

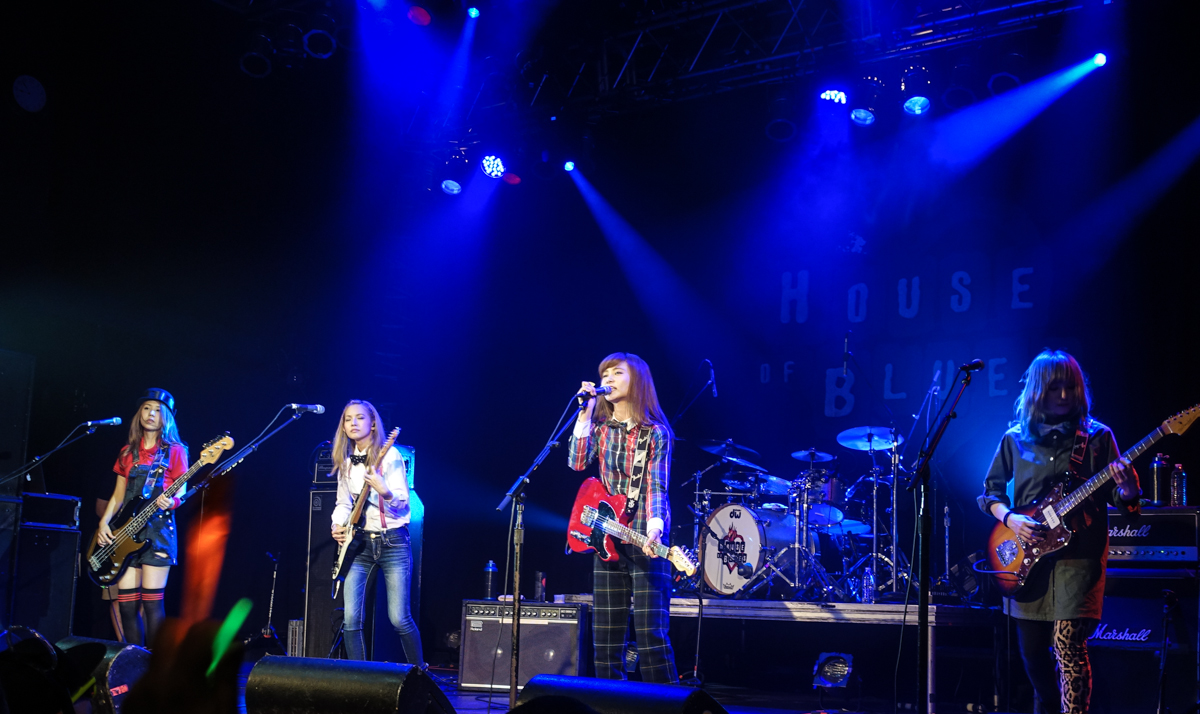
- Scandal at the House of Blues in Anaheim, California, 2015.
- Studio albums: 12
- Extended plays: 3
- Live albums: 7
- Compilation albums: 5
- Singles: 32
- Video albums: 3
- Music videos: 66

The discography of the Japanese pop rock band Scandal consists of twelve studio albums, twenty-seven singles, seven live albums, four compilation, three extended plays and three other video albums.

== Albums ==
=== Studio albums ===
| Title | Album details | Peak chart positions | | Sales (JPN) |
| Title | Album details | JPN | JPN Billb. | Sales (JPN) |
|---|---|---|---|---|
| Best Scandal | Released: October 21, 2009; Label: Epic | 5 | 5 | 52,956 |
| Temptation Box | Released: August 11, 2010; Label: Epic | 3 | 4 | 60,301 |
| Baby Action | Released: August 10, 2011; Label: Epic | 4 | 4 | 55,664 |
| Queens Are Trumps: Kirifuda wa Queen | Released: September 26, 2012; Label: Epic | 4 | 3 | 50,476 |
| Standard | Released: October 2, 2013; Label: Epic | 3 | 3 | 58,092 |
| Hello World | Released: December 3, 2014; Label: Epic, JPU Records | 3 | 4 | 49,517 |
| Yellow | Released: March 2, 2016; Label: Epic, JPU Records | 2 | 2 | 39,204 |
| Honey | Released: February 14, 2018; Label: Epic, JPU Records | 3 | 2 | 27,626 |
| Kiss from the Darkness | Released: February 12, 2020; Label: Victor Entertainment, JPU Records | 5 | 4 | 19,977 |
| Mirror | Released: January 26, 2022; Label: Victor Entertainment, JPU Records | 5 | 5 | 9,654 |
| Luminous | Released: March 20, 2024; Label: Victor Entertainment | 11 | — | 9,071 |
| Echo | Released: May 27, 2026; Label: Victor Entertainment | 12 | — | 8,314 |

=== Compilation albums ===
| Title | Album details | Peak chart positions | | Sales (JPN) |
| Title | Album details | JPN | JPN Billb. | Sales (JPN) |
|---|---|---|---|---|
| R-Girl's Rock! | Released: 2010; Label: Epic | — | — | |
| Scandal Show | Released: March 7, 2012; Label: Epic | 3 | 3 | 64,140 |
| Encore Show | Released: February 6, 2013; Label: Epic | 3 | 3 | 37,682 |
| Greatest Hits – European Selection | Released: May 4, 2015; Label: JPU Records | — | — | |
| Scandal | Released: February 15, 2017; Label: Epic | 2 | 3 | 42,081 |
"—" denotes a release that did not chart.

== Extended plays ==
| Title | Album details | Peak chart positions | | Sales (JPN) |
| Title | Album details | JPN | JPN Billb. | Sales (JPN) |
|---|---|---|---|---|
| Yah! Yah! Yah! Hello Scandal: Maido! Scandal Desu! Yah Yah Yah! | Released: August 8, 2008; Label: Kitty | — | — | 1,736 |
| R-Girl's Rock! | Released: November 17, 2010; Label: Epic | 9 | 8 | 19,908 |
| Love, Spark, Joy! | Released: March 5, 2025; Label: Victor Entertainment | 20 | — | 4,331 |
"—" denotes a release that did not chart.

== Other album appearances ==
| Song | Year | Peak chart positions | Album |
| Song | Year | JPN | Album |
|---|---|---|---|
| "Space Ranger", "Love Pattern" | 2008 | — | Japan Nite Sound Sampler 2008 |
| "Start" | 2008 | 234 | Star Ocean Second Evolution Original Soundtrack |
| "Daydream" | 2009 | — | Judy And Mary: 15th Anniversary Tribute Album |
| "Shunkan Sentimental", "瞬間センチメンタル (4th Season Ending Theme)" | 2010 | — | Fullmetal Alchemist Final Best |
| "Haruka" (Special version) | 2011 | — | Tofu Kozō Original Soundtrack |
| "Burn" | 2011 | — | Kenji Kawai-ラビット・ホラー オリジナル・サウンドトラック |
| "How Crazy" (Yui cover) | 2012 | 7 | She Loves You |
| "ピンヒールサーファー", "Beauteen", "Stamp" | 2015 | — | J-Music Mix 01 (by) Evolution Works |
| "Sisters" | 2015 | — | J-Music Mix 02 (by) Evolution Works |
| "ピンヒールサーファー", "Stamp!", "瞬間センチメンタル" | 2016 | — | 2016 Rewind |
| "Stamp", "Beauteen" | 2016 | — | J-Music Mix 03 (by) Evolution Works: Non-Stop Mixed by DJ Laxxell |
| "Everybody Says Yeah!" | 2018 | — | Takkyu Ishino Works 1983-2017 |
| "Scandal In The House" | 2018 | — | The Break Floor Hits Mix |
| "Take Me Out" | 2019 | — | J-Music Mix 05 (by) Evolution Works |
| "少女S" | 2020 | — | |
"—" denotes a release that did not chart.

== Singles ==
| Title | Year | Peak positions | | | | Sales (JPN) | Album |
| Title | Year | JPN | JPN Hot | JPN Hot Anim. | JPN RIAJ | Sales (JPN) | Album |
|---|---|---|---|---|---|---|---|
| "Space Ranger" (スペースレンジャー) | 2008 | 186 | — | — | — | 401 | Hello Scandal |
| "Koi Moyō" (恋模様, "Love Pattern") | 2008 | 150 | — | — | — | 686 | Hello Scandal |
| "Kagerō" (カゲロウ, "Mayfly") | 2008 | 122 | — | — | — | 586 | Hello Scandal |
| "Doll"^{[A]} | 2008 | 26 | 5 | — | — | 12,572 | Best Scandal |
| "Sakura Goodbye" (SAKURAグッバイ) | 2009 | 30 | 22 | — | — | 6,995 | Best Scandal |
| "Shōjo S" (少女S, "Girls")^{[A]} | 2009 | 6 | 7 | — | 5 | 33,881 | Best Scandal |
| "Yumemiru Tsubasa" (夢見るつばさ, "Dreaming of Wings") | 2009 | 12 | 14 | — | — | 7,450 | Best Scandal |
| "Shunkan Sentimental" (瞬間センチメンタル, "Sentimental Moment")^{[B]} | 2010 | 7 | 17 | — | 3 | 32,624 | Temptation Box |
| "Taiyō to Kimi ga Egaku Story" (太陽と君が描くSTORY, "The Story Drawn by You and the Sun") | 2010 | 10 | 22 | — | 42 | 16,027 | Temptation Box |
| "Namida no Regret" (涙のリグレット, "Tears of Regret") | 2010 | 14 | 27 | — | 27 | 12,176 | Temptation Box |
| "Scandal Nanka Buttobase" (スキャンダルなんかブッ飛ばせ, "Send Scandals Flying") | 2010 | 3 | 7 | — | — | 35,772 | Baby Action |
| "Pride" | 2011 | 7 | 16 | 1 | 6 | 25,531 | Baby Action |
| "Haruka" (ハルカ, "Distant") | 2011 | 3 | 14 | 3 | 14 | 32,238 | Baby Action |
| "Love Survive" | 2011 | 11 | 21 | — | 22 | 17,250 | Baby Action |
| "Harukaze" | 2012 | 6 | 10 | 2 | 6 | 33,095 | Queens Are Trumps: Kirifuda wa Queen |
| "Taiyō Scandalous" (太陽スキャンダラス, "Scandalous Sun") | 2012 | 2 | 7 | — | 8 | 39,033 | Queens Are Trumps: Kirifuda wa Queen |
| "Pin Heel Surfer" (ピンヒールサーファー) | 2012 | 9 | 15 | — | — | 13,585 | Queens Are Trumps: Kirifuda wa Queen |
| "Awanai Tsumori no, Genki de ne" (会わないつもりの、元気でね, "I Don't Plan on Seeing You Again, Take Care") | 2013 | 4 | 10 | — | — | 40,639 | Standard |
| "Kagen no Tsuki" (下弦の月, "Waning Moon") | 2013 | 5 | 6 | — | — | 34,712 | Standard |
| "Over Drive" | 2013 | 7 | 6 | — | — | 19,208 | Standard |
| "Departure" | 2014 | 5 | 3 | — | — | 39,861 | Hello World |
| "Yoake no Ryuuseigun" (夜明けの流星群, "A Meteor Shower at Dawn") | 2014 | 5 | 3 | 1 | — | 42,967 | Hello World |
| "Image" | 2014 | 14 | 14 | — | — | 14,519 | Hello World |
| "Stamp!" | 2015 | 5 | 7 | — | — | 25,556 | Yellow |
| "Sisters" | 2015 | 9 | 7 | — | — | 18,058 | Yellow |
| "Take Me Out" (テイクミーアウト) | 2016 | 11 | 7 | — | — | 21,880 | Honey |
| "Masterpiece / Mabataki" (マスターピース / まばたき, "Masterpiece / Blink") | 2019 | 5 | 8 | — | — | — | Kiss from the darkness |
| "Eternal" | 2021 | 10 | — | — | — | — | Mirror |
| "Ivory" | 2021 | — | — | — | — | — | Mirror |
| "One More Time" | 2021 | — | — | — | — | — | Mirror |
| "Line of Sight" | 2023 | — | — | — | — | — | Luminous |
| "Highlight no naka de bokura zutto" | 2023 | — | — | — | — | — | Luminous |
"—" denotes a release that did not chart.

Singles notes

- A Both certified gold for selling over 100,000 digital copies.
- B Certified platinum for selling over 250,000 digital copies.

=== Digital singles ===
| Title | Year | Peak positions | Album |
| Title | Year | JPN Hot | Album |
|---|---|---|---|
| "Koisuru Universe" (恋するユニバース) | 2017 | 83 | Honey |
| "Fuzzy" | 2019 | — | Kiss from the Darkness |
| "Saishūheiki, Kimi" (最終兵器、君) | 2019 | — | Kiss from the Darkness |
| "A.M.D.K.J." | 2020 | — | Kiss from the Darkness |
| "Living in the City" | 2020 | — | Mirror(CD Only) |
| "Spice" | 2020 | — | Mirror(CD Only) |
| "Girl is Ghost" | 2026 | — | — |
"—" denotes a release that did not chart.

=== Promotional singles ===
| Title | Year | Peak positions | Album |
| Title | Year | JPN RIAJ | Album |
|---|---|---|---|
| "Secret Base (Kimi ga Kureta Mono)" (君がくれたもの, "Things You Gave Me") (Zone cover) | 2010 | 18 | R-Girl's Rock! |
| Everybody Say Yeah! (Takkyu Ishino Remix) | 2013 | — | |
| "Love in Action" | 2014 | — | Hello World |
| "Chiisana Honoō" (ちいさなほのお, "Little Flame") | 2015 | — | Yellow |
| "Morning Sun" | 2016 | — | Yellow |
| "Suki-Suki" | 2016 | — | Yellow |
"—" denotes a release that did not chart.

=== Other charted songs ===
| Title | Year | Peak positions | | Album |
| Title | Year | JPN Hot | JPN Adult | Album |
|---|---|---|---|---|
| "S.L. Magic" | 2008 | — | 84 | "Doll" single |
| "Satisfaction" (サティスファクション) | 2011 | 61 | 76 | "Haruka" single |
| "Brand New Wave" | 2013 | 48 | — | Standard |
| "Freedom Fighters" | 2017 | 100 | — | Scandal |
"—" denotes a release that did not chart.

=== Split singles ===
| Title | Year | Peak positions | | Sales (JPN) | Album |
| Title | Year | JPN | JPN Hot | Sales (JPN) | Album |
|---|---|---|---|---|---|
| Count Zero/Runners High (Sengoku Basara 4 EP) (Count ZERO/Runners high ～戦国BASARA4 EP～) (with T.M.Revolution) | 2014 | 5 | 7/76 | 39,563 | Ten/Hello World |

== Videography ==
=== DVDs ===
| Title | Year | Peak positions | | Sales (JPN) |
| Title | Year | Oricon Music DVD Chart | Oricon DVD Chart | Sales (JPN) |
|---|---|---|---|---|
| Scandal First Live: Best Scandal 2009 | 2010 | 5 | 5 | 11,107 |
| Scandal Anime | 2010 | — | — | — |
| Everybody Say Yeah!: Temptation Box Tour 2010: Zepp Tokyo | 2011 | 5 | 8 | 11,175 |
| Video Action | 2011 | 2 | 5 | 14,067 |
| Japan Title Match Live 2012: Scandal vs Budokan | 2012 | 2 | 8 | 15,710 |
| Scandal Osaka-Jo Hall 2013: Wonderful Tonight | 2013 | 4 | 10 | 15,130 |
| Scandal Arena Live 2014: Festival | 2015 | 2 | 3 | 11,234 |
| Scandal Arena Tour 2015–2016: Perfect World | 2016 | 5 | 5 | 5,304 |
| Scandal 10th Anniversary Festival: 2006–2016 | 2016 | 3 | 4 | 8,406 |
| Video Action 2 | 2016 | 12 | 19 | 3,433 |
| Scandal World Tour 2020 "Kiss from the darkness" | 2020 | 3 | 3 | 5,937 |
"—" denotes items that did not chart or were not released.

=== Music videos ===
| Year | Title | Director(s) |
|---|---|---|
| 2008 | "Space Ranger" | Ugichin |
| 2008 | "Koi Moyō" (anime) | Ugichin |
| 2008 | "Space Ranger" (studio) | ? |
| 2008 | "Doll" | Ugichin |
| 2009 | Sakura Goodbye | Ugichin |
| 2009 | "Shōjo S" | Yuu Shinagawa |
| 2009 | "Yumemiru Tsubasa" | Yuu Shinagawa |
| 2009 | "BEAUTeen!!" | Kyōtarō Toyota |
| 2009 | "Koi Moyō" | ? |
| 2010 | "Shunkan Sentimental" | A.T. |
| 2010 | "Taiyō to Kimi ga Egaku Story" | Masaaki Uchino |
| 2010 | "Secret Base (Kimi ga Kureta Mono)" | Atsushi Nakai |
| 2010 | "Namida no Regret" | A.T. |
| 2010 | "Scandal Nanka Buttobase" | Yuuya Hara |
| 2010 | "Koshi-Tantan" (Loups=Garous ver.) | ? |
| 2010 | "Koshi-Tantan" (motion capture anime ver.) | ? |
| 2011 | "Pride" | Yasuhiko Shimizu |
| 2011 | "Cute!" (Scandal meets Cinnamoroll ver.) | Gen Hosoya |
| 2011 | "Haruka" | Kensuke Kawamura |
| 2011 | "Haruka" (Tofu Kozō Special Music Video) | ? |
| 2011 | "Love Survive" | Smith |
| 2011 | "Scandal no Theme" | ? |
| 2012 | "Harukaze" | A.T. |
| 2012 | "Taiyō Scandalous" | Yuuya Hara |
| 2012 | "Pin Heel Surfer" | Smith |
| 2013 | "Playboy" | Wataru Saitō |
| 2013 | "Satisfaction" | ? |
| 2013 | "Awanai Tsumori no, Genki de ne" | Daishin Suzuki |
| 2013 | "Kagen no Tsuki" | Toshihiko Imai |
| 2013 | "Kimi to Mirai to Kanzen Dōki" | ? |
| 2013 | "Over Drive" | Wataru Saitō |
| 2013 | "Scandal in the House" | ? |
| 2014 | "Runners High" | Chie Okazawa |
| 2014 | "Departure" | Toshihiko Imai |
| 2014 | "Your Song" | ? |
| 2014 | "Yoake no Ryuuseigun" | Kanji Sutō |
| 2014 | "Pokémon Ieru Kana?" | Kōichi Sakamoto |
| 2014 | "Image" | Masakazu Fukatsu |
| 2015 | "Stamp!" | Hidenobu Tanabe |
| 2015 | "Sisters" | Hidenobu Tanabe |
| 2015 | "Sisters" (Another Version) | ? |
| 2015 | "Chiisana Honoō" | ? |
| 2016 | "Love Me Do" | Naokazu Mitsuishi |
| 2016 | "Take Me Out" | Hidenobu Tanabe |
| 2016 | "Scandal Baby" | ? |
| 2017 | "Koisuru Universe" | Hidenobu Tanabe |
| 2018 | "Platform Syndrome" | ? |
| 2019 | "Masterpiece" | DaishinSZK |
| 2019 | "Mabataki" | Tsugumi Matsunaga |
| 2019 | "Fuzzy" | マザーファッ子 |
| 2019 | "Saishuheiki Kimi" | マザーファッ子 |
| 2020 | "A.M.D.K.J." | Hiroshi Usui |
| 2020 | "Tonight" | Toru Nomura |
| 2020 | "Living in the City" | ? |
| 2021 | "Eternal" | Oudai Kojima |
| 2021 | "Ivory" | Wakisaka Yuuki |
| 2021 | "One more time" | マザーファッ子 |
| 2022 | "Mirror" | マザーファッ子 |
| 2022 | "Ai ni Naranakatta no Sa" | マザーファッ子 |
| 2023 | "Line of sight" | Hidenobu Tanabe |
| 2023 | "Highlight no naka de bokura zutto" | Hidenobu Tanabe |
| 2024 | "Fanfare" | Hidenobu Tanabe |
| 2025 | "Terra Boy" | YODEN |
| 2025 | "Doukashiterutte" | YODEN |
| 2025 | "Soundly" | YODEN |
| 2026 | "Girl is Ghost" | YODEN |
