= Konna no Idol Janain!? =

- Genre: Comedy
- Starring: Aya Hirano; Uki Satake; Sayaka Nishiwaki; Kanae Yoshii; Umika Kawashima; Hirona Murata
- Country of origin: Japan
- Original language: Japanese
- No. of seasons: 1
- No. of episodes: 12

Original release
- Network: NTV
- Release: 11 January – 28 March 2012

Konna no Idol Janain!? (こんなのアイドルじゃナイン!?) is a 2012 Japanese television comedy series.

== Cast ==
- Aya Hirano as Mari Gonda
- Uki Satake
- Sayaka Nishiwaki
- Kanae Yoshii
- Umika Kawashima
- Hirona Murata
