= List of Star Driver episodes =

Star Driver
- Cover of the first DVD volume
- No. of episodes: 25

Release
- Original network: JNN (MBS)
- Original release: October 3, 2010 – April 3, 2011

Star Driver, also known as Star Driver: Kagayaki no Takuto (STAR DRIVER 輝きのタクト, Sutā Doraibā Kagayaki no Takuto; lit. 'STAR DRIVER: Takuto of The Radiance'), is a 2010 Japanese anime television series created and animated by Bones and produced by Aniplex. It takes place on the fictional Southern Cross Isle. It focuses on the teenager named boy Takuto who enrolls in Southern Cross High School as a freshman and makes new friends. However, beneath the school is a group of mysterious giants called Cybodies, which can be controlled by humans in an alternate dimension known as Zero Time. Takuto finds himself dragged into opposition with the Glittering Crux Brigade, a mysterious group that intends to take possession of the island's Cybodies for their own purposes.

The series is directed by Takuya Igarashi, with character designs by Yoshiyuki Ito and Hiroka and Misa Mizuya. The anime premiered on October 3, 2010 and ended on April 3, 2011. The series has been licensed by Aniplex of America and was streamed with English subtitles on Hulu, Crackle, and on Crunchyroll starting on August 17, 2011. Aniplex of America premiered the first episode at the 2010 New York Comic Con/New York Anime Festival on October 9, 2010. The series was collected by Aniplex in a total of nine DVD and Blu-ray volumes. A blu-ray box was also released on January 23, 2013.

The series uses four musical themes: two opening themes and two ending themes. For the first thirteen episode, the opening theme for the series is "Gravity Ø" by Aqua Timez and the ending theme is "Cross Over" by 9nine. From episodes 14–25, the opening theme "Shining Star" by 9nine and the ending theme is "Pride" by Scandal.

== Episode list ==
No.	Title (Note: English translated titles are taken from Crunchyroll.)	Storyboard by	Directed by	Written by	Original release date
1	"The Ginga Bishonen"; Transliteration: "Ginga Bishonen" (Japanese: 銀河美少年)	Takuya Igarashi	Yoshiyuki Asai	Yōji Enokido	October 3, 2010
A boy named Takuto Tsunashi, swims from the mainland to a small island to make a difference in his life. After making friends with Sugata and Wako who rescued him, Takuto enrolls in the local school and gets himself involved in a conflict with the secret organization "Kiraboshi Order of Cross", who kidnap Wako as part of their plan to take control of the island's secret treasure.
2	"The Challenge of the Kiraboshi Order of Cross"; Transliteration: "Kiraboshi Jūjidan no Chōsen" (Japanese: 綺羅星十字団の挑戦)	Kenji Nagasaki (Note: Credited under the pen name "Tōji Kisaragi" (如月 トウジ, Kisaragi Tōji).)	Keisuke Ōnishi	Yōji Enokido	October 10, 2010
The leaders of the many factions among Kiraboshi decide that whoever defeats Takuto will become the order's main commander. Meanwhile, Takuto is introduced to Wako's friends at the drama club that also oppose the order's plans.
3	"The Otona Bank"; Transliteration: "Otona Ginkō" (Japanese: おとな銀行)	Shin Matsuo	Shin Matsuo	Yōji Enokido	October 17, 2010
Takuto is short on cash and is invited by his classmate Kanako to take up a cleaning job at her own luxury cruise ship. Little does he know, that both Kanako and her employees are part of Kiraboshi and one of them will become his next opponent.
4	"Wako's Song"; Transliteration: "Wako no Utagoe" (Japanese: ワコの歌声)	Makoto Bessho	Makoto Fuchigami	Yōji Enokido	October 24, 2010
While wandering alone through the city, Wako meets Takuto and the two spend some time talking about her past and her duties as a shrine maiden, until they find that they are trapped in an illusion created by one of the enemy's cybodies.
5	"The Meaning of Mandrake"; Transliteration: "Mandoragora no Hanakotoba" (Japanese: マンドラゴラの花言葉)	Michio Fukuda	Hisatoshi Shimizu	Yōji Enokido	October 31, 2010
Professor Green, the school's nurse and leader of Kiraboshi science division is determined to infatuate all boys of the school with the aid of a powerful love potion and her special ability of returning temporarily to a teenager state. After failing to capture Takuto's heart, she fights it out with him in Zero Space.
6	"The King's Pillar"; Transliteration: "Ō no Hashira" (Japanese: 王の柱)	Toshinori Narita	Toshinori Narita	Yōji Enokido	November 7, 2010
It's Sugata's birthday today, and he hates it. Wako explains to Takuto why and tells him that Sugata also possesses a powerful Cybody, but Apprivoising it may put his life in danger. Whilst going to Sugata's home to celebrate his birthday, they're attacked by a mysterious Glittering Star member, and Sugata ends up doing what Wako feared most to protect them.
7	"A Faraway World"; Transliteration: "Tōi Sekai" (Japanese: 遠い世界)	Kōtarō Tamura	Keisuke Ōnishi	Yōji Enokido	November 14, 2010
Sugata remains unconscious much to Wako and Takuto's grief and the same Kiraboshi member who attacked them the previous night challenges Takuto on her Cybody.
8	"Always Like a Shooting Star"; Transliteration: "Itsudatte Ryūsei no yō ni" (Japanese: いつだって流星のように)	Tarō Iwasaki	Tarō Iwasaki	Yōji Enokido	November 21, 2010
Despite being happy that Sugata regained consciousness, Takuto is angry with him for not accepting Wako's present. Just when they are at brink of fighting, Scarlet Kiss, the leader Kiraboshi "Filament" squad captures Sugata and uses his powers to increase the capabilities of her own Cybody in order to confront Takuto.
9	"That Mizuno's First Love"; Transliteration: "Sonna Mizuno no Hatsukoi" (Japanese: そんなミズノの初恋)	Michio Fukuda	Yoshihide Yūzumi	Yōji Enokido	November 28, 2010
Head takes a break from his position as leader of Kiraboshi "Vanishing Age" squad and leaves another member, Marino Yoh, aka Manticore in his place. Little do the order know that Marino's twin sister Mizuno is actually one of the four maidens.
10	"And Now Marino's First Love"; Transliteration: "Soshite Marino no Hatsukoi" (Japanese: そしてマリノの初恋)	Tetsuya Yanagisawa	Ikurō Satō	Yōji Enokido	December 5, 2010
Takuto and his classmates play a baseball game against Mizuno and Marino's class. During the match, Marino's growing interest in Takuto brings forth the anger of one of Manticore's subordinates who decides to challenge him in Zero Time.
11	"How to Use Cybodies for Personal Gain"; Transliteration: "Saibadi no Shiteki Katsuyōjutsu" (Japanese: サイバディの私的活用術)	Shingo Kaneko	Makoto Fuchigami	Yōji Enokido	December 12, 2010
Determined to take revenge upon Kanako by taking over Kiraboshi leadership, her assistant Simone devises a plan to fight Takuto with the aid of Takashi who gains a second chance to confront Tauburn.
12	"Kiss Through Glass"; Transliteration: "Garasu Goshi no Kisu" (Japanese: ガラス越しのキス)	Tarō Iwasaki	Tarō Iwasaki	Yōji Enokido	December 19, 2010
Kanako is determined to become leader of the Kiraboshi by defeating Tauburn in combat, but before challenging Takuto, she invites him to a date.
13	"The Red Sword In Love"; Transliteration: "Koisuru Akai Ken" (Japanese: 恋する紅い剣)	Takahiro Ikezoe	Kenji Takahashi	Yōji Enokido	December 26, 2010
In order to confront Takuto once more and regain her position as a Star Driver, Benio volunteers herself to be a test subject in an experiment to reactivate destroyed Cybodies.
14	"Ayingot's Eyes"; Transliteration: "Aingotto no Me" (Japanese: アインゴットの眼)	Michio Fukuda	Hisatoshi Shimizu	Yōji Enokido	January 9, 2011
Having successfully managed to reactivate a broken Cybody, the members of Kiraboshi use the same process to repair Manticore's cybody hoping to use its special ability to discover the identity of the West maiden. They soon they find that ploy to be a mistake when it escapes Marino's control and goes berserk.
15	"Shrine Maidens of the Seals"; Transliteration: "Fūin no Miko" (Japanese: 封印の巫女)	Yukihiro Matsushita	Yoshiyuki Asai	Yōji Enokido	January 16, 2011
Mizuno and Marino's estranged mother returns and a desperate Mizuno tries to leave the island to avoid her, but her maiden powers prevents her to do so. Wako confronts her and finds that she is the West maiden, a fact that already known by Kiraboshi.
16	"Takuto's Emblem"; Transliteration: "Takuto no Shirushi" (Japanese: タクトのシルシ)	Toshinori Narita	Toshinori Narita	Yōji Enokido	January 23, 2011
Having captured Mizuno, the members Kiraboshi manage to break her seal and reach the Third Phase. While Mizuno manages to glimpse Takuto's past and his days before he gains his emblem, he struggles against Head, whose cybody resembles his own in both appearance and abilities.
17	"Vanishing Age"; Transliteration: "Banishingu Ēji" (Japanese: バニシングエージ)	Michio Fukuda	Takahiko Kyōgoku	Yōji Enokido	January 30, 2011
Having assembled all remaining able pilots under his leadership, Head takes over Kiranosji and prepares for the breaking of the two final seals. But first they must defeat Takuto, who now must find a way to defeat his newest opponent, Madoka Kei, without bringing harm to her.
18	"Kate's Morning and Night"; Transliteration: "Keito no Asa to Yo" (Japanese: ケイトの朝と夜)	Sōichi Masui	Yoshihide Yūzumi	Yōji Enokido	February 6, 2011
Takuto's room is destroyed by fireworks and Sugata offers a room at his mansion for him to stay. To make ends meet, Takuto starts working at the same karaoke bar as his classmate Kate Nichi, unaware that she is the East Maiden, and also a member of Kiraboshi.
19	"The Trio's Sunday"; Transliteration: "Sannin no Nichiyōbi" (Japanese: 三人の日曜日)	Yukihiro Matsushita	Ikurō Satō	Yōji Enokido	February 13, 2011
Sugata and Takuto hang out with Wako to celebrate her birthday, but their cheerful day is disturbed by Kō Atari, another member of Kiraboshi, who uses her powers on them to amuse herself.
20	"The Rainbow Painted That Day"; Transliteration: "Egakareta Ano Hi no Niji" (Japanese: 描かれたあの日の虹)	Michio Fukuda	Hisatoshi Shimizu	Yōji Enokido	February 20, 2011
Ryousuke Katashiro, Vanishing Age's second in command, reminisces about his past with Reiji and his former fiancee Sora. Meanwhile, Ginta Ryo, another member of Kiraboshi, uses his First Phase ability to spy on the island's inhabitants and find out why Reiji is not with haste to break the final seals. He decides to challenge Takuto by himself, but not before have him poisoned by a snake.
21	"The Libidinal Age"; Transliteration: "Ribidōna Otoshigoro" (Japanese: リビドーなお年頃)	Kenji Nagasaki	Makoto Fuchigami	Yōji Enokido	February 27, 2011
After Kō was defeated by Takuto once again, Madoka volunteers herself to an experiment to further increase her cybody's abilities, but in result her body was fused with it, leaving Takuto defenseless as he is unable to fight back without harming her.
22	"On the Eve of the Legend"; Transliteration: "Shinwa Zen'ya" (Japanese: 神話前夜)	Toshinori Narita, Takuya Igarashi	Toshinori Narita	Yōji Enokido	March 6, 2011
The time has come for the drama club's play and Takuto's first performance. Along the spectators is Hana, an old friend of his who comes to meet him and Wako. After the play, Sugata allegedly falls into a deep slumber again and finds that Kate has used her powers to keep him awake, revealing that she is the East Maiden.
23	"Emperor"; Transliteration: "Enperā" (Japanese: エンペラー)	Takahiro Ikezoe	Ikurō Satō	Yōji Enokido	March 20, 2011
The Vanishing Age squad is more determined than ever to break the seals and Takuto is forced to face three of their members at once. He manages to overcome them thanks to Sugata's help, but unbeknownst to him, Sugata himself is later introduced to the Kiraboshi as their new leader.
24	"Eastern Shrine Maiden"; Transliteration: "Higanishi no Miko" (Japanese: ひが日死の巫女)	Michio Fukuda	Yoshiyuki Asai	Yōji Enokido	March 27, 2011
The members of Kiraboshi prepare themselves for the destruction of the remaining seals. After being pulled into Zero Time for their final battle, Takuto and Wako learn that Kate and Sugata are members of the Kiraboshi, and when the Eastern seal is released, the King Cybody, Samekh, is finally broken free.
25	"Our Apprivoiser"; Transliteration: "Boku-tachi no Apuribowase" (Japanese: 僕たちのアプリボワゼ)	Takuya Igarashi, Yasushi Muraki	Takuya Igarashi	Yōji Enokido	April 3, 2011
Reiji shows his true colors and uses the powers of his cybody to hijack Samekh and restore all previously destroyed cybodies to put them under his control. The remaining members of Kiraboshi manage to regain control of their cybodies and confront Samekh just to be easily overpowered by it, and it's up only to Takuto to put an end to his father's ambitions and rescue Sugata.
