= Segodon =

2018 taiga drama about samurai Saigō Takamori

- Promotional poster
- Based on: Segodon! by Mariko Hayashi
- Written by: Miho Nakazono
- Directed by: Yūsuke Noda; Makoto Bonkabara; Takeshi Okada; Yoshimi Ishizuka; Yūsuke Horiuchi; Keisuke Ōshima
- Starring: Ryohei Suzuki; Eita; Haru Kuroki; Ryo Nishikido; Fumi Nikaidō; Shunsuke Kazama; Nanami Sakuraba; Takurō Ōno; Muga Tsukaji; Yukiya Kitamura; Rin Takanashi; Munetaka Aoki; Shota Matsuda; Tetsuji Tamayama; Yuki Uchida; Keiko Kitagawa; Shun Oguri; Shōfukutei Tsurube II; Shiro Sano; Renji Ishibashi; Morio Kazama; Masatō Ibu; Kenichi Endō; Akira Emoto; Takeshi Kaga; Keiko Matsuzaka; Ken Watanabe
- Narrated by: Toshiyuki Nishida
- Opening theme: "Segodon －Main Theme－" (「西郷どん －メインテーマ－」)
- Composer: Harumi Fūki
- Country of origin: Japan
- Original language: Japanese
- No. of episodes: 47

Production
- Executive producers: Ken Sakurai; Sōichi Sakurai
- Producer: Chieko Konishi
- Running time: 45 minutes

Original release
- Network: NHK
- Release: January 7 – December 16, 2018

Segodon (西郷どん; Mr. Saigō in Kagoshima dialect) is a 2018 Japanese historical drama television series and the 57th NHK taiga drama. It stars Ryohei Suzuki as Saigō Takamori, who has been dubbed the last true samurai.

== Plot ==
The drama follows the life of historical figure Saigō Takamori. Born the first son of a lower-class samurai, he was exiled two times and went through three marriages. He was one of the central figures of the Meiji Restoration but later rebelled against the government over dissatisfaction with Meiji reforms.

== Cast ==
=== Saigo family ===
- Ryohei Suzuki as Saigō Takamori
  - Ao Watanabe as Kokichi (young Takamori)
- Keiko Matsuzaka as Saigō Masa, the mother of Takamori
- Morio Kazama as Saigō Kichibei, the father of Takamori
- Toshiyuki Nishida as Saigō Kikujirō, Takamori's son
  - Yuki Imai as Teen Kikujirō
  - Kairi Jō as Child Kikujirō
- Ai Hashimoto as Suga, the first wife of Takamori
- Haru Kuroki as Iwayama Ito, the third wife of Takamori
  - Konomi Watanabe as young Ito
- Ryo Nishikido as Saigō Jūdō, one of Takamori's brothers
  - Taiyō Saitō as Saigō Shingo (young Jūdō)
- Mone Kamishiraishi as Saigō Kiyo, the wife of Jūdō
- Gōta Watabe as Saigō Kichijirō, one of Takamori's brothers
  - Taketo Arai as young Kichijirō
- Yuki Kashiwagi as Saigō Sono, the wife of Kichijirō
- Nanami Sakuraba as Ichiki (née Saigō) Koto, one of Takamori's sisters
  - Yuki Kurimoto as young Koto
- Yūki Maekawa as Ichiki Sōsuke, Koto's son
- Yū Kayano as Saigō Yasu, one of Takamori's sisters
- Kumi Mizuno as Kimi, the grandmother of Takamori
- Kon Ōmura as Saigō Ryūemon, the grandfather of Takamori
- Muga Tsukaji (Drunk Dragon) as Kumakichi
- Mayuko Saigō as Saigō Sakurako
- Maika Hara as Saigō Taka, one of Takamori's sisters
- Yūki Yagi as Saigō Kikusō, Takamori's daughter

=== Ōkubo family ===
- Eita as Ōkubo Toshimichi
  - Tatsuki Ishikawa as young Toshimichi
- Rie Mimura as Ōkubo Masu, the wife of Toshimichi
- Mitsuru Hirata as Ōkubo Jiemon, the father of Toshimichi
- Mariko Fuji as Ōkubo Fuku, the mother of Toshimichi
- Tamami Kusaka as Ōkubo Suma
- Yuki Uchida as Oyū

=== Satsuma Domain ===
- Ken Watanabe as Shimazu Nariakira, the master of Takamori
- Munetaka Aoki as Shimazu Hisamitsu
- Takeshi Kaga as Shimazu Narioki
- Rumiko Koyanagi as Yura
- Raita Ryu as Zusho Hirosato
- Seiya Osada as Shimazu Mochihisa
  - Rasei Nakajima as young Mochihisa
- Naho Toda as Kiku
- Yukiya Kitamura as Ōyama Kakunosuke (later Ōyama Tsunayoshi)
  - Naoki Inukai as young Kakunosuke
- Mitsuomi Takahashi as Arimura Shunsai (later Kaeda Nobuyoshi)
  - Yūto Ikeda as young Shunsai
- Arata Horii as Murata Shinpachi
  - Kenshirō Katō as young Shinpachi
- Ikki Sawamura as Akayama Yukie
- Jun Itoda as Katsura Hisatake
- Yu Tokui as Yamada Tamehisa
- Shūichirō Masuda as Arima Shinshichi
  - Masaki Izawa as young Shinshichi
- Takurō Ōno as Nakamura Hanjirō
  - Rukito Nakamura as young Hanjirō
- Manabu Hamada as Sakoda Tomonoshin
- Shiori Sugioka as Oaki
- Tomoya Warabino as Ebihara Shigekatsu
- Keita Machida as Komatsu Tatewaki
- Yoshimasa Kondo as Tanaka Yūnosuke
- Ayumi Tanida as Koba Den'nai
- Teppei Akashi as Narahara Kihachirō
- Yūki Izumisawa as Kawaji Toshiyoshi
- Hideo Sakaki as Shinohara Kunimoto
- Yūshin Shinohara as Beppu Shinsuke

General public

- Rin Takanashi as Fuki
  - Rinka Kakihara as young Fuki
- Taku Suzuki (Drunk Dragon) as Heiroku, Fuki's father
- Sumie Sasaki as Ishi, Kumakichi's grandmother
- Fujita Okamoto as Itagaki Yosaji
- Toshiyuki Kitami as Ijūin Naogorō, Suga's father
- Masayuki Shionoya as Iwayama Naoatsu, Ito's father

The people of Amami Ōshima

- Fumi Nikaidō as Aikana, the second wife of Takamori
- Akira Emoto as Ryū Samin
- Midori Kiuchi as Ishichiyo Kane
- Natsuko Akiyama as Yuta
- Tsutomu Takahashi as Tomiken
- Honami Kurashita as Komurume
- Anna Sato as Satochiyo Kane

The people of Okinoerabujima

- Renji Ishibashi as Kawaguchi Seppō
- Yoshiki Saitō as Tsuchimochi Masateru
- Yōko Ōshima as Tsuchimochi Tsuru

=== Chōshū Domain ===
- Tetsuji Tamayama as Kido Takayoshi
- Kenta Hamano as Itō Hirobumi
- Hayashiya Shōzō IX as Ōmura Masujirō
- Hikaru Futagami as Kusaka Genzui
- Osaomu Kaō as Shiraishi Shōichirō
- Riki Choshu as Kijima Matabei
- Manabu Ino as Kikkawa Kenmotsu
- Masayuki Satō as Miyoshi Shinzō

=== Tosa Domain ===
- Shun Oguri as Sakamoto Ryōma
- Asami Mizukawa as Oryō, the wife of Ryōma
- Shogo Yamaguchi as Nakaoka Shintarō
- Akira Otaka as Yamauchi Yōdō, the lord of Tosa
- Ryo Segawa as Gotō Shōjirō

=== Fukui Domain ===
- Kanji Tsuda as Matsudaira Shungaku
- Shunsuke Kazama as Hashimoto Sanai
- Asahi Yoshida as Nakane Yukie

=== Tokugawa shogunate ===
- Shota Matsuda as Tokugawa Yoshinobu, the last shōgun
- Kenichi Endō as Katsu Kaishū
- Naoki Matayoshi as Tokugawa Iesada, the 13th shōgun
- Tamotsu Kanshūji as Tokugawa Iemochi, the 14th shōgun
  - Towa Araki as young Iemochi
- Naohito Fujiki as Abe Masahiro
- Shirō Sano as Ii Naosuke
- Shinji Asakura as Hotta Masayoshi
- Satoshi Jimbo as Nagano Shuzen
- Takahiro Fujimoto as Yamaoka Tesshū
- Jundai Yamada as Hiraoka Enshirō
- Masami Horiuchi as Itakura Katsukiyo

Ōoku

- Keiko Kitagawa as "Tenshō-in" Atsuhime
- Yoko Minamino as Ikushima, the tutor of Atsuhime
- Pinko Izumi as Honjuin, Iesada's mother

=== Aizu and Kuwana Domains ===
- Shuji Kashiwabara as Matsudaira Katamori
- Ken Shōnozaki as Matsudaira Sadaaki

=== Imperial Court ===
- Nakamura Kotarō VI as Emperor Kōmei, the 121st emperor of Japan
- Nomura Man'nojō VI as Emperor Meiji, the 122nd emperor of Japan
- Shōfukutei Tsurube II as Iwakura Tomomi
- Tomiyuki Kunihiro as Konoe Tadahiro
- Nomura Manzō IX as Sanjō Sanetomi
- Takeshi Nadagi as Nakagawa-no-miya
- Kenichi Ogata as Nakayama Tadayasu
- Yasuto Kosuda as Prince Arisugawa Taruhito

=== The Government of Meiji ===
- Shugo Oshinari as Inoue Kaoru
- Shingo Murakami as Yamagata Aritomo
- Kiyohiko Shibukawa as Itagaki Taisuke
- Hiroyuki Onoue as Ōkuma Shigenobu
- Takaya Sakoda as Etō Shinpei

=== Foreigners ===
- Thane Camus as Harry Smith Parkes
- Hannah Grace as Mrs. Parkes
- Steve Wiley as Ernest Mason Satow
- Blake Crawford as Townsend Harris
- Gilles Beaufils as Léon Roches
- Noam Katz as Charles Lennox Richardson
- Nathan Berry as Dr. William Willis

=== Others ===
- Masatō Ibu as Tokugawa Nariaki, the father of Yoshinobu
- Onoe Kikunosuke V as Getshō
- Kimihiko Hasegawa as Date Munenari
- Takayasu Komiya as Tokugawa Yoshikatsu
- Michiko Tanaka as Tama
- Takashi Tome as Den'emon
- Hitori Gekidan as John Manjirō
- Haruna Kondō (Harisenbon) as Tora
- Michifumi Isoda as Naiki Jinzaburō, the first mayor of Kyoto
- Kōkichi Tanoue as Naoo Nakahara

== Production ==
Production Credits

- Narrator – Toshiyuki Nishida
- Music – Harumi Fūki
- Historical research – Izumi Haraguchi, Manabu Ōishi and Michifumi Isoda
- Architectural research – Kiyoshi Hirai
- Costume designer – Kazuko Kurosawa
- Kagoshima dialect instructors – Takaya Sakoda and Kōkichi Tanoue

The series is based on the novel Segodon! by Mariko Hayashi which was first released in serial format starting February 2016 in the literature magazine Hon no Tabibito, and published as a book by Kadokawa Shoten the year after.

=== Casting ===
Ryohei Suzuki was announced to portray the lead role of Saigō Takamori in Segodon on November 2, 2016. The main cast for the Saigo and Okuba family were announced on March 27, 2017, which includes Eita, Haru Kuroki, Nanami Sakuraba, Gōta Watabe, Muga Tsukaji, Morio Kazama, Mitsuru Hirata, and Keiko Matsuzaka. The main cast for the Shimazu family was announced on June 27, 2017, which includes Munetaka Aoki, Naho Toda, Yu Tokui, and Ken Watanabe. In September 2017, it was announced that Yuki Saito would not be able to play as Ikushima, and was eventually replaced by Yoko Minamino. By November 2017, Etsuko Ichihara also had to drop out as narrator of the series due to her ongoing recovery from encephalomyelitis, and was eventually replaced by Toshiyuki Nishida.

== TV schedule ==
Episode	Title	Directed by	Original airdate	Rating
1	"Satsuma no Yassenbo" (薩摩のやっせんぼ)	Yūsuke Noda	January 7, 2018	15.4%
2	"Rippa na Osamurai" (立派なお侍)	Yūsuke Noda	January 14, 2018	15.4%
3	"Kodomo wa Kuni no Takara" (子どもは国の宝)	Yūsuke Noda	January 21, 2018	14.2%
4	"Atarashiki Hanshu" (新しき藩主)	Yūsuke Noda	January 28, 2018	14.8%
5	"Sumō ja! Sumō ja!" (相撲じゃ！相撲じゃ！)	Makoto Bonkobara	February 4, 2018	15.5%
6	"Nazo no Hyōryūsha" (謎の漂流者)	Makoto Bonkobara	February 11, 2018	15.1%
7	"Haha no Senaka" (母の背中)	Takeshi Okada	February 18, 2018	14.3%
8	"Fukitsu na Yome" (不吉な嫁)	Takeshi Okada	February 25, 2018	14.2%
9	"Edo no Hie-sama" (江戸のヒー様)	Yūsuke Noda	March 4, 2018	14.8%
10	"Atsuhime wa doko e" (篤姫はどこへ)	Makoto Bonkobara	March 11, 2018	14.4%
11	"Nariakira Ansatsu" (斉彬暗殺)	Yasuko Tsuda	March 18, 2018	14.6%
12	"Un no Tsuyoki Himegimi" (運の強き姫君)	Yasuko Tsuda	March 25, 2018	14.1%
13	"Kawaranai Tomo" (変わらない友)	Yūsuke Noda	April 8, 2018	13.0%
14	"Yoshinobu no Honki" (慶喜の本気)	Takeshi Okada	April 15, 2018	11.9%
15	"Tono no Shi" (殿の死)	Yūsuke Noda	April 22, 2018	13.4%
16	"Nariakira no Yuigon (斉彬の遺言)	Takeshi Okada	April 29, 2018	11.1%
17	"Saigō Jusui" (西郷入水)	Yasuko Tsuda	May 6, 2018	12.0%
18	"Runin, Kikuchi Gengo" (流人、菊池源吾)	Makoto Bonkobara	May 13, 2018	14.4%
19	"Aikana" (愛加那)	Makoto Bonkobara	May 20, 2018	13.7%
20	"Shōsuke no Kuroi Ishi" (正助の黒い石)	Yūsuke Noda	May 27, 2018	12.2%
21	"Wakare no Uta" (別れの唄)	Yoshimi Ishizuka	June 3, 2018	12.0%
22	"Idai na Ani, Jigoro na Otōto" (偉大な兄 地ごろな弟)	Takeshi Okada	June 10, 2018	13.4%
23	"Teradaya Sōdō" (寺田屋騒動)	Yoshimi Ishizuka	June 17, 2018	13.4%
24	"Chi no Hate nite" (地の果てにて)	Makoto Bonkobara	June 24, 2018	12.2%
25	"Ikasareta Inochi" (生かされた命)	Makoto Bonkobara	July 1, 2018	12.7%
26	"Saigō, Kyō e" (西郷、京へ)	Yūsuke Noda	July 15, 2018	12.2%
27	"Kinmon no Hen" (禁門の変)	Yūsuke Noda	July 22, 2018	12.0%
28	"Katsu to Ryōma" (勝と龍馬)	Takeshi Okada	July 29, 2018	11.1%
29	"Sandome no Kekkon" (三度目の結婚)	Yūsuke Horiuchi	August 5, 2018	11.6%
30	"Kaijin Iwakura Tomomi" (怪人 岩倉具視)	Yūsuke Noda	August 12, 2018	10.3%
31	"Ryōma tono Yakusoku" (龍馬との約束)	Takeshi Okada	August 19, 2018	11.0%
32	"Satchō Dōmei" (薩長同盟)	Yoshimi Ishizuka	August 26, 2018	10.4%
33	"Ito no Chikai" (糸の誓い)	Yoshimi Ishizuka	September 2, 2018	13.2%
34	"Shōgun Yoshinobu" (将軍慶喜)	Makoto Bonkobara	September 9, 2018	11.9%
35	"Ikusa no Oni" (戦の鬼)	Makoto Bonkobara	September 16, 2018	11.7%
36	"Yoshinobu no Kubi" (慶喜の首)	Yūsuke Horiuchi	September 23, 2018	11.0%
37	"Edo Muketsu-Kaijō" (江戸無血開城)	Yūsuke Noda	October 7, 2018	9.9%
38	"Kizudarake no Ishin" (傷だらけの維新)	Yūsuke Noda	October 14, 2018	10.2%
39	"Chichi, Saigō Takamori" (父、西郷隆盛)	Makoto Bonkobara	October 21, 2018	12.3%
40	"Haran no Shinseifu" (波乱の新政府)	Keisuke Ōshima	October 28, 2018	11.7%
41	"Atarashiki Kuni e" (新しき国へ)	Yoshimi Ishizuka	November 4, 2018	11.8%
42	"Ryōyū Gekitotsu" (両雄激突)	Yūsuke Noda	November 11, 2018	11.3%
43	"Saraba, Tokyo" (さらば、東京)	Makoto Bonkobara	November 18, 2018	11.6%
44	"Shizoku tachi no Dōran" (士族たちの動乱)	Yoshimi Ishizuka	November 25, 2018	12.4%
45	"Saigō Tatsu" (西郷立つ)	Keisuke Ōshima	December 2, 2018	11.5%
46	"Seinan Sensō" (西南戦争)	Makoto Bonkobara	December 9, 2018	11.4%
47	"Keiten Aijin" (敬天愛人)	Yūsuke Noda	December 16, 2018	13.8%
Average rating 12.7% - Rating is based on Japanese Video Research (Kantō region).

=== Omnibus ===
Episode	Title	Original airdate	Original airtime
1	"Satsuma" (薩摩)	December 30, 2018	13:05 - 14:05
2	"Saisei" (再生)	December 30, 2018	14:05 - 14:55
3	"Kakumei" (革命)	December 30, 2018	15:05 - 16:25
4	"Tenmei" (天命)	December 30, 2018	16:25 - 17:35

== Soundtracks ==
- "Segodon" Taiga Drama Original Soundtrack I (February 21, 2018)
- "Segodon" Taiga Drama Original Soundtrack II (August 8, 2018)
- "Segodon" Taiga Drama Original Soundtrack III (October 10, 2018)

== See also ==
- Bakumatsu
