= Scandal Nanka Buttobase =

Single by Scandal

from the album Baby Action
- Released: October 6, 2010
- Genre: J-pop; hard rock
- Length: 3:29
- Label: Epic Records Japan
- Songwriter(s): Ryudo Uzaki, Yoko Aki

Scandal singles chronology
"Namida no Regret" (2010)	"Scandal Nanka Buttobase" (2010)	"Pride" (2011)

Music video
- "Scandal Nanka Buttobase" on YouTube

"Scandal Nanka Buttobase" (スキャンダルなんかブッ飛ばせ) is the eighth major single (11th overall) released by Scandal. It was released in four versions: three limited CD+DVD editions and a regular CD-only edition. All limited editions came housed in a cardboard case along with a first press bonus of a button badge. The limited editions and the first press of the regular edition also came with a special photo booklet and a greeting event application card. Each DVD contains the full version of one of the band's performances on their television show Shiteki Ongaku Jijou. The title track was written and composed by the husband-and-wife duo Yoko Aki and Ryudo Uzaki, who are known for creating many songs for Momoe Yamaguchi. The single reached #3 on the Oricon weekly chart and charted for seven weeks, selling 35,772 copies, making it Scandal's physically best selling single.

== Track listing ==
All lyrics are written by Yoko Aki; all music is composed by Ryudo Uzaki

CD (ESCL-3548)
No.	Title	Length
1.	"Scandal Nanka Buttobase" (スキャンダルなんかブッ飛ばせ)	3:29
2.	"Scandal Nanka Buttobase (Instrumental)" (スキャンダルなんかブッ飛ばせ)	3:26
Total length:		6:55

Limited edition DVD A (ESCL-3543)
No.	Title	Length
1.	"Namida no Regret (Special Clip)" (涙のリグレット -SPECIAL CLIP-)	5:17
Total length:		6:55

Limited edition DVD B (ESCL-3545)
No.	Title	Length
1.	"Taiyō to Kimi ga Egaku Story (Special Clip)" (太陽と君が描くSTORY -SPECIAL CLIP-)	4:05
Total length:		6:55

Limited edition DVD C (ESCL-3547)
No.	Title	Length
1.	"Shunkan Sentimental (Special Clip)" (瞬間センチメンタル -SPECIAL CLIP-)	3:50
Total length:		6:55
