= Best Scandal =

BEST★SCANDAL

Studio album by SCANDAL
- Released: October 21, 2009
- Recorded: 2008–2009
- Genre: Rock; garage rock; pop punk
- Length: 50:32
- Language: Japanese
- Label: Epic Records Japan

SCANDAL chronology
BEST★SCANDAL (2009)	Temptation Box (2010)

Singles from BEST★SCANDAL
- 1. "Space Ranger" Released: March 3, 2008; 2. "Koi Moyō" Released: April 4, 2008; 3. "Kagerō" Released: May 5, 2008; 4. "Doll" Released: October 22, 2008; 5. "Sakura Goodbye" Released: March 4, 2009; 6. "Shōjo S" Released: June 17, 2009; 7. "Yumemiru Tsubasa" Released: October 14, 2009

Professional ratings
Review scores
Source	Rating
AllMusic	4/5 stars

Best Scandal (stylized as BEST★SCANDAL) is the debut studio album of Japanese pop rock band Scandal. It was released in three versions with different covers: the regular CD only version, a limited version that consists of CD with DVD, and a collector's edition consisting of a CD and SCANDAL BY SCANDAL, a 284-page coffee table book featuring photos of the band members taken by the band themselves. The album reached no. 5 on the Oricon weekly charts and charted for 21 weeks.

== Track listing ==
No.	Title	Lyrics	Music	Arrangement	Length
1.	"SCANDAL BABY"	Tomomi	Yuichi Tajika	Tajika, Keita Kawaguchi	5:04
2.	"Shōjo S" (少女S; Girls)	Tomomi	Tajika	Ken Iijima	3:11
3.	"DOLL"	Tomomi	Satoshi Tokita	Susumu Nishikawa, SCANDAL	3:24
4.	"Koi Moyō" (恋模様; Love Pattern)	Haruna	MASTERWORKS	MASTERWORKS	3:44
5.	"Yumemiru Tsubasa" (夢見るつばさ; Dreaming of Wings)	SCANDAL, Aiji Hayama, Sachio Kubota	Kubota	Katsu Hoshi	3:44
6.	"Anata ga Mawaru" (アナタガマワル; You Are Spinning)	Tomomi, Noriyasu Isshiki	Isshiki	A×S×E	4:19
7.	"Space Ranger" (スペースレンジャー)	Tomomi, Haruna	Ryosuke Shimohata	Shimohata, MASTERWORKS	3:30
8.	"Ring! Ring! Ring!"	Mami, Tajika	Tajika	Tajika, Kawaguchi	3:45
9.	"Maboroshi Night" (マボロシナイト; Phantom Night)	SCANDAL, Iijima	Iijima	Iijima	3:48
10.	"Kimi to Yoru to Namida" (キミと夜と涙; You, Night, and Tears)	Rina, Tajika	Tajika	Ryo Eguchi	4:21
11.	"Hitotsu Dake" (ひとつだけ; Only One)	Haruna	Koichi Tsutaya	Tomohiro Okubo	3:19
12.	"SAKURA Goodbye" (SAKURAグッバイ; Cherry Blossom Goodbye)	Tomomi, MASTERWORKS	MASTERWORKS	Kotaro Kubota	3:56
13.	"Kagerō -album mix-" (カゲロウ; Mayfly)	Tomomi, MASTERWORKS	Jin Nakamura	Nakamura	4:27

DVD
No.	Title	Length
1.	"Space Ranger (Music video)"
2.	"Koi Moyou (Music video)"
3.	"DOLL (Music video)"
4.	"SAKURA Goodbye (Music video)"
5.	"Shoujo S (Music video)"
6.	"BEAUTeen!! (Music video)"
7.	"Yumemiru Tsubasa (Music video)"
8.	"S.L. Magic (Pre-debut U.S.-France-Hong Kong music documentary video)"
9.	"Koi no Kajitsu (Pre-debut U.S.-France-Hong Kong music documentary video)"
10.	"Shoujo S (Making of the music video)"
11.	"Yumemiru Tsubasa (Making of the music video)"

== Personnel ==
- HARUNA (Haruna Ono) - lead vocals, rhythm guitar
- MAMI (Mami Sasazaki) - lead guitar, vocals
- TOMOMI (Tomomi Ogawa) - bass, vocals
- RINA (Rina Suzuki) - drums, vocals

== Sales ==
Total Reported Sales: 52,956
Total Sales in 2009: 44,995 (#197 album of the year) Total Sales in 2010: 7,961
