= Tick Tock 2Nite =

"Tick Tock 2nite"

Single by 9nine

from the album 9nine
- A-side: "Tick Tack 2nite"
- B-side: "Angel Drops"
- Released: December 21, 2011 (Japan)
- Genre: J-pop
- Label: SME Records
- Producer: Agehasprings

9nine singles chronology
"Natsu Wanna Say Love U" (2011)	"Tick Tock 2nite" (2011)	"Shōjo Traveller" (2012)

Professional ratings
Review scores
Source	Rating
Hotexpress	Favorable

"Tick Tock 2Nite" (チクタク☆2NITE, Chikutaku Tūnaito) is the 8th single by the Japanese girl idol group 9nine, released in Japan on December 21, 2011, on the label SME Records (a subsidiary of Sony Music Entertainment Japan).

The physical CD single debuted at number 12 in the Oricon weekly singles chart.

== Background ==
The song "Tick Tock 2Nite" was the theme song of a Ranma ½ live-action TV special (dorama) titled Ranma ½ Live-action Special and premiered in Japan on NTV on December 9, 2011.

== Release ==
The single was released in four versions: three limited editions (Limited Edition A, Limited Edition B, and Limited Edition C) and a regular edition. Each edition had a different cover. All the limited editions included a bonus DVD.

== Track listing ==
CD
No.	Title	Length
1.	"Tick Tock 2Nite" (チクタク☆2NITE)	3:36
2.	"Angel Drops" (Angel drops)	3:48
3.	"Cross Over (tofubeats remix)"	5:44
4.	"Tick Tock 2Nite (Instrumental)"
5.	"Angel Drops (Instrumental)"

Limited Edition A DVD
No.	Title	Length
1.	"Material World (We are 9nine♥〜あれから1年経ちました!9nineの日スペシャルライブ〜 新宿BLAZE/2011.9.10)"
2.	"We are 9nine♥〜あれから1年経ちました!9nineの日スペシャルライブ〜 新宿BLAZEオフショット【直前リハーサル編】"

Limited Edition B DVD
No.	Title	Length
1.	"Konwaku Confuse (We are 9nine♥〜あれから1年経ちました!9nineの日スペシャルライブ〜 新宿BLAZE/2011.9.10)"
2.	"We are 9nine♥〜あれから1年経ちました!9nineの日スペシャルライブ〜 新宿BLAZEオフショット【本番直前編】"

Limited Edition C DVD
No.	Title	Length
1.	"Wonderful World (We are 9nine♥〜あれから1年経ちました!9nineの日スペシャルライブ〜 新宿BLAZE/2011.9.10)"
2.	"We are 9nine♥〜あれから1年経ちました!9nineの日スペシャルライブ〜 新宿BLAZEオフショット【直前リハーサル編】"

== Charts ==
Chart (2011)	Peak position
Japan (Oricon Daily Singles Chart)	9
Japan (Oricon Weekly Singles Chart)	12
