= Fastest Finger First =

Fastest Finger First may refer to:

- Fastest Finger First, the preliminary round in the quiz show Who Wants to Be a Millionaire?
- Fastest Finger First, a spin-off show to the original UK edition of Who Wants to Be a Millionaire
- Nana Maru San Batsu (Fastest Finger First in English), a Japanese manga series
