= Shōjo Traveller =

Single by 9nine

from the album 9nine
- A-side: "Shōjo Traveller"
- B-side: "Monochro"; "Shining Star" (Tofubeats remix)
- Released: January 25, 2012 (Japan)
- Genre: J-pop
- Label: SME Records
- Producer: Agehasprings

9nine singles chronology
"Tick Tock 2Nite" (2011)	"Shōjo Traveller" (2012)	"Ryūsei no Kuchizuke" (2012)

"Shōjo Traveller" (少女トラベラー) is the 9th single by the Japanese girl idol group 9nine, released in Japan on January 25, 2012, on the label SME Records (a subsidiary of Sony Music Entertainment Japan).

The physical CD single debuted at number 9 in the Oricon weekly singles chart.

== Background ==
The song "Shōjo Traveller" was an ending theme of the Japanese anime television series Beelzebub (in the episodes 49 to 59).

== Release ==
The single was released in four versions: three limited editions (Limited Edition A, Limited Edition B, and Limited Edition C) and a regular edition. All the limited editions included a bonus DVD. Each edition had a different cover.

== Track listing ==
CD
No.	Title	Length
1.	"Shōjo Traveller" (チクタク☆2NITE)	4:42
2.	"Monochro" (モノクロ)	4:38
3.	"Shining Star (Tofubeats remix)" (SHINING☆STAR (tofubeats remix))	6:59
4.	"Shōjo Traveller (Instrumental)"
5.	"Monochro (Instrumental)"

Limited Edition A DVD
No.	Title	Length
1.	"Shōjo Traveller (Music Video)"
2.	"Shōjo Traveller (Music Video Making)"
3.	"Shōjo Traveller (Dance Shot ver.)"

Limited Edition B DVD
No.	Title	Length
1.	"Tick Tock 2Nite (Music Video)"
2.	"Tick Tock 2Nite (Music Video Making)"
3.	"Tick Tock 2Nite (Dance Shot ver.)"

Limited Edition C DVD
No.	Title	Length
1.	"「夏 wanna say love U」発売イベント握手会3,939人達成までの軌跡"
2.	"3,939人と握手達成記念『9nine Beach Party 2011』/2011.8.17（「too blue」「119」＆メンバーコメント）"

== Charts ==
Chart (2012)	Peak position
Japan (Oricon Daily Singles Chart)	6
Japan (Oricon Weekly Singles Chart)	9
