= The Handsome Suit =

The Handsome Suit (ハンサム★スーツ, Hansamu Sūtsu) is a Osamu Suzuki's Novel. And 2008 Japanese film directed by Tsutomu Hanabusa. The film showed at the 2009 11th Udine Far East Film International Premiere.

== Plot ==
An overweight restaurant owner Takuro (Muga Tsukaji) while popular with people for his delicious dinners, is unlucky in love because of his looks, dress sense and terrible habits. Takuro longs for his part-time waitress Hiroko who fell for him because of his warm-hearted nature, but rejects him because she believes he only cares about her looks.

A distraught Takuro is given the opportunity to try out a new invention, the Handsome Suit, which will make him good-looking, tall and deep-voiced. He puts it on and transforms himself into "Annin Hikariyama" and quickly becomes a supermodel. He meets "Raika", who a gorgeous, beautiful and prestigious model. She becomes attracted to him as she works and aggressively seduces him. He delights in it, indulges in kissing Raika, and almost falls in love with her. Annin also appears before Hiroko, and his handsome face and seductive overtures stir Hiroko's stubborn heart. In contrast to Takuro, Annin's handsome face, now a top model, makes Hiroko fall in love with him completely

Noticing how differently he’s treated, Takuro has to learn to overcome how looks matter both to himself and to society in general

== Cast ==
- Muga Tsukaji as Takuro Ohki
- Shosuke Tanihara as Annin Hikariyama
- Keiko Kitagawa as Hiroko Hoshino
- Miyuki Oshima as Motoe Hashino
- Hiroyuki Ikeuchi as Shinsuke Hazama
- Kiyoshi Nakajo as Shiraki
- Mayumi Sada as Raika.
