= Star Driver =

Japanese anime television series

- Cover of the first DVD volume

STAR DRIVER 輝きのタクト (Sutā Doraibā Kagayaki no Takuto)
- Genre: Action, mecha
- Created by: Bones
- Manga
- Written by: Key by Ylab
- Published by: Square Enix
- Magazine: Young Gangan
- Original run: September 17, 2010 – December 2, 2011
- Volumes: 3
- Anime television series
- Directed by: Takuya Igarashi
- Produced by: Hiroo Maruyama; Ryō Ōyama; Nobuyuki Kurashige; Yoshihiro Ōyabu; Makoto Furukawa; Hirofumi Inagaki
- Written by: Yōji Enokido
- Music by: Satoru Kōsaki (Monaca)
- Studio: Bones
- Licensed by: AUS: Madman Entertainment; NA: Aniplex of America
- Original network: JNN (MBS)
- English network: AU: C31 Melbourne, West TV; SEA: Animax Asia
- Original run: October 3, 2010 – April 4, 2011
- Episodes: 25
- Anime film

Star Driver: The Movie
- Directed by: Takuya Igarashi
- Produced by: Toshihiro Maeda; Kiwa Watanabe; Hiroshi Kawashima; Yoshirō Tsuchiya
- Written by: Yoji Enokido
- Music by: Monaca: Satoru Kōsaki; Kakeru Ishihama; Keigo Hoashi; Keiichi Okabe; Ryūichi Takada
- Studio: Bones
- Released: February 9, 2013
- Runtime: 150 minutes
- icon

Star Driver, also known as STAR DRIVER: Kagayaki no Takuto (Japanese: STAR DRIVER 輝きのタクト, Hepburn: Sutā Doraibā Kagayaki no Takuto; "Star Driver: Shining Takuto"), is a Japanese anime television series created and animated by Bones. It was broadcast for twenty-five episodes on MBS and TBS from October 2010 to April 2011. The anime was licensed in North America by Aniplex of America and was streamed with English subtitles on Hulu, Crackle, and Crunchyroll. A compilation film was released on February 9, 2013, in Japan by Shochiku.

== Plot ==
Star Driver takes place on the fictional Southern Cross Isle. One night, a boy named Takuto washes up on shore swimming from the mainland. He later enrolls in Southern Cross High School as a freshman and makes new friends. However, beneath the school is a group of mysterious giants called Cybodies, which can be controlled by humans in an alternate dimension known as Zero Time. Takuto, the "Galactic Pretty Boy" (銀河美少年, Ginga Bishōnen), finds himself dragged into opposition with the "Glittering Crux Brigade" (綺羅星十字団, Kiraboshi Jūjidan; lit. 'Glittering Star Cruciform Group'), a mysterious group that intends to take possession of the island's Cybodies for their own purposes as well as break the seals of the island's four Shrine Maidens, whose powers prevent the Cybodies from functioning outside of Zero Time.

== Media ==
=== Anime ===
The series is directed by Takuya Igarashi, with character designs by Yoshiyuki Ito and Hiroka and Misa Mizuya. The anime premiered on October 3, 2010, and ended on April 3, 2011. The series was collected by Aniplex in a total of nine DVD and Blu-ray volumes. A Blu-ray box was also released on January 23, 2013.

In North America, Aniplex of America premiered the first episode at the 2010 New York Comic Con/New York Anime Festival on October 9, 2010. Bandai Entertainment formerly licensed the series in 2011. The series was streamed with English subtitles by Aniplex of America on Hulu, Crackle, and Crunchyroll starting on August 17, 2011.

=== Music ===
Opening themes

- "Gravity Ø" by Aqua Timez (1–13)
- "Shining☆Star" by 9nine (14–24)

Ending themes

- "Cross Over" by 9nine (1–13)
- "Pride" by Scandal (14–25)

Insert Maiden songs

- "First Galaxy" by Takuto Tsunashi (Mamoru Miyano)
- "Monochrome" (モノクローム, Monokurōmu) by Sakana-chan (Haruka Tomatsu)
- "Komorebi no Contact" (木漏れ日のコンタクト, Komorebi no Kontakuto; Sunbeam Contact) by Wako Agemaki (Saori Hayami)
- "Innocent Blue" (イノセント・ブルー, Inosento Burū) by Mizuno Yō (Rina Hidaka)
- "Shūshoku no Aria" (秋色のアリア; Aria of Autumn Color) by Nichi Keito (Ami Koshimizu)

=== Manga ===
A manga adaptation, illustrated by Key by Ylab, was serialized in Square Enix's Young Gangan from September 17, 2010, to December 2, 2011. Square Enix collected its chapters in three tankōbon volumes, released from February 26, 2011, to January 25, 2012.
