= Colorful (9nine song) =

Single by 9nine

from the album Cue
- Released: February 6, 2013
- Genre: J-pop
- Label: SME Records

9nine singles chronology
"White Wishes" (2012)	"Colorful" (2013)	"Evolution No. 9" (2013)

Professional ratings
Review scores
Source	Rating
Billboard Japan	Favorable

"Colorful" (stylized as "colorful") is the 13th single by 9nine, a Japanese idol girl group. It was released on February 6, 2013 on SME Records.

== Overview ==
This is the first single of 2013, two months after the previous single "White Wishes". The title song is the theme song for the animated movie "Star Driver The Movie", the first movie theme song for 9nine. In addition to the "Normal Edition", the "Limited First Edition A" and "Limited First Edition B" include a DVD of the one-man live "9nine in the Wild Sound" held at Hibiya Open-Air Concert Hall on August 19, 2012, and the "Limited First Edition (Luxury Studora Edition)" includes the music video for "colorful". The album was released in four formats.

== Track listing ==
CD
No.	Title	Length
1.	"colorful"
2.	"やさしい雨"
3.	"少女トラベラー (tofubeats remix)"
4.	"colorful (Instrumental)"
5.	"やさしい雨 (Instrumental)"

== Charts ==
Chart (2013)	Peak position
Japan (Oricon Weekly Singles Chart)	13
