= Muga Tsukaji =

Japanese comedian and actor (born 1971)

- 塚地 武雅
- Born: 25 November 1971 (age 54); Hannan, Osaka, Japan
- Other name: Tsukacchan
- Education: Momoyama Gakuin University Department of Economics; School JCA
- Occupations: Comedian; actor
- Years active: 1996–present
- Agent: Production Jinrikisha
- Notable work: "Iitai koto mo Iezu ni"; "Ika Daiō Taisō Dai 2"
- Style: Conte (boke)
- Partner: Taku Suzuki
- Awards: Kinema Junpo Best New Actor (2006); 30th Japan Academy Prize Newcomer of the Year/Popularity Award (2006); Blue Ribbon Awards Best Newcomer (2006); Mainichi Film Awards Newcomer Award (2006)
- Website: Drunk Dragon official profile

Notes
- Same year/generation as: Rahmens; Shinagawa Shoji; Rozan; License; Shuhei Shimada

Muga Tsukaji (塚地 武雅, Tsukaji Muga; born 25 November 1971) is a Japanese comedian and actor. He performs boke (sometimes tsukkomi) in the comedy duo Drunk Dragon. His partner is Taku Suzuki. He is nicknamed Tsukacchan (塚っちゃん).

Tsukaji was born in Hannan, Osaka. He graduated from Hannan Municipal Tottori Junior High School, Osaka Prefectural Sano High School and Momoyama Gakuin University Department of Economics.

Tsukaji co-starred with the comedy duo Hokuyō, who shared the same agency, in Haneru no Tobira.

== Filmography ==
=== TV dramas ===
Year	Title	Role	Notes	Ref.
2007–09	Hadaka no Taishō	Kiyoshi Yamashita	Lead role; 4 episodes	
2010	Wagaya no Rekishi	Kiyoshi Yamashita	Miniseries; episode 3	
2012	Taira no Kiyomori	Fujiwara no Nobuyori	Taiga drama	
2018	Segodon	Kumakichi	Taiga drama	
2019	You Are Marked for Death	Akio Motomiya		
2019–25	Emergency Interrogation Room	Matsuo Tamagaki	3 seasons	
2020	Papa Fell in Love Again	Ossan-Taeko		
2021	Ochoyan	Atarō Hanaguruma	Asadora	
2024	The Tiger and Her Wings	Rokurō Unno	Asadora	
2026	Reboot	Kikuchi		

=== Films ===
Year	Title	Role	Notes	Ref.
2008	The Handsome Suit	Takuro Oki	Lead role	
2020	We Make Antiques! Kyoto Rendezvous	Shirō Tanaka		
2021	Suicide Forest Village			
2021	The Lone Ume Tree			
2022	Akira and Akira			
2023	We Make Antiques! Osaka Dreams	Shirō Tanaka		
2025	Emergency Interrogation Room: The Final Movie	Matsuo Tamagaki		

=== Regular programmes ===
Year	Title	Notes	Ref.
2016	EX Maniakkusu	MC	
