= Baby Action =

Studio album by Scandal
- Released: August 10, 2011
- Recorded: 2010–2011
- Genres: Pop rock; alternative rock; dance rock
- Length: 52:47
- Language: Japanese
- Label: Epic Records Japan

Scandal chronology
Temptation Box (2010)	Baby Action (2011)	Queens Are Trumps: Kirifuda wa Queen (2012)

Singles from Baby Action
- 1. "Scandal Nanka Buttobase" Released: October 6, 2010; 2. "Pride" Released: February 9, 2011; 3. "Haruka" Released: April 20, 2011; 4. "Love Survive" Released: July 27, 2011

Baby Action is the third studio album by the Japanese rock band Scandal, released in 2011. The album reached No. 4 on the Oricon chart and charted for 11 weeks.

== Track listing ==
No.	Title	Lyrics	Music	Arrangement	Length
1.	"GLAMOROUS YOU"	Mami, Hidenori Tanaka	Tanaka	Keita Kawaguchi	4:06
2.	"Sono Toki, Sekai wa Kimi Darake no Rain" (その時、世界はキミだらけのレイン; Then the world was rainy full of you)	Suto Hisashi	Aida Shigekazu	Shigekazu	3:12
3.	"Love Survive"	Haruna, Tanaka	Tanaka	Tokushi	3:41
4.	"Sparkling"	Tomomi, Tanaka	Tanaka	Atsushi	3:51
5.	"BURN"	Rina, Hiroshi Inui	Inui	Youtorilon	5:19
6.	"Appletachi no Dengon" (アップルたちの伝言; Message of the Apples)	Tomomi, Yuichi Tajika	Tajika	Kawaguchi	4:18
7.	"Tokyo Skyscraper" (東京スカイスクレイパー; Tokyo Skyscraper)	Rina, Tooru Hidaka	Hidaka	Hidaka	4:38
8.	"Pride"	Tomomi, Tanaka	Tanaka	Kawaguchi	4:31
9.	"Haruka" (ハルカ; Distant)	Haruna, Tanaka	Tanaka	Kawaguchi	5:07
10.	"Scandal Nanka Buttobase" (スキャンダルなんかブッ飛ばせ; Sending Scandals Flying)	Yoko Aki	Ryudo Uzaki	Takeshi Fujii	3:26
11.	"Very Special"	Tomomi	Tomomi, Rina	Kawaguchi, SCANDAL	4:44
12.	"One Piece"	Rina, Tajika	Tajika	THE COMPANY	5:54

DVD Edition bonus videos
No.	Title	Length
1.	"SCANDAL no Theme (Video)" (SCANDALのテーマ; Theme of SCANDAL)
2.	"2011 Zepp Tour Digest Movie"

== Personnel ==
- HARUNA (Haruna Ono) - lead vocals, rhythm guitar
- MAMI (Mami Sasazaki) - lead guitar, vocals
- TOMOMI (Tomomi Ogawa) - bass, vocals
- RINA (Rina Suzuki) - drums, vocals

Guest musicians

- Sae - alto and tenor sax on track 6
- Tomomi Sekiguchi - trumpet on track 6
- r.u.ko - keyboards on track 7
