= Yie Ar! Jiang Shi feat. Hao Hao! Jiang Shi Girl / Brave =

Single by 9nine

from the album Cue
- A-side: "Brave"; "Yie Ar! Jiang Shi feat. Hao Hao! Jiang Shi Girl"
- Released: November 14, 2012 (Japan)
- Genre: J-pop
- Label: SME Records

9nine singles chronology
"Ryūsei no Kuchizuke" (2012)	"Yie Ar! Jiang Shi feat. Hao Hao! Jiang Shi Girl / Brave" (2012)	"White Wishes" (2012)

Professional ratings
Review scores
Source	Rating
Rolling Stone Japan	3.5/5 stars
Billboard Japan	Favorable

"Yie Ar! Jiang Shi feat. Hao Hao! Jiang Shi Girl / Brave" (イーアル！キョンシー ｆｅａｔ．好好！キョンシーガール／Ｂｒａｖｅ) is the 11th single by the Japanese girl idol group 9nine, released in Japan on November 14, 2012, on the label SME Records (a subsidiary of Sony Music Entertainment Japan).

It is a double A-side single.

The physical CD single debuted at number 11 in the Oricon weekly singles chart.

== Background ==
The single was released in four versions: Limited Editions A and B and Regular Editions 1 and 2.

Both limited editions had an additional track on the CD. Also Limited Edition A included a bonus DVD with two versions of the music video for "Brave", and Limited Edition B included a bonus DVD with two versions of the music video for "Yie Ar! Jiang Shi feat. Hao Hao! Jiang Shi Girl".

Each edition had a different cover.

== Track listing ==
=== Regular Edition A ===
CD
No.	Title	Length
1.	"Brave"
2.	"Yie Ar! Jiang Shi feat. Hao Hao! Jiang Shi Girl" (イーアル!キョンシー feat.好好!キョンシーガール)
3.	"Brave (Instrumental)"
4.	"Yie Ar! Jiang Shi feat. Hao Hao! Jiang Shi Girl (Instrumental)"

=== Limited Edition A ===
CD
No.	Title	Length
1.	"Brave"
2.	"Yie Ar! Jiang Shi feat. Hao Hao! Jiang Shi Girl" (イーアル!キョンシー feat.好好!キョンシーガール)
3.	"Yie Ar! Jiang Shi feat. Hao Hao! Jiang Shi Girl (Akakage's Skankin' Breaks)" (イーアル!キョンシー feat.好好!キョンシーガール (AKAKAGE's Skankin' Breaks))
4.	"Brave (Instrumental)"
5.	"Yie Ar! Jiang Shi feat. Hao Hao! Jiang Shi Girl (Instrumental)"

Limited Edition A DVD
No.	Title	Length
1.	"Brave (Music Video)"
2.	"Brave (Music Video Making)"
3.	"Brave (Dance Shot ver.)"

=== Regular Edition B ===
CD
No.	Title	Length
1.	"Yie Ar! Jiang Shi feat. Hao Hao! Jiang Shi Girl"
2.	"Brave"
3.	"Yie Ar! Jiang Shi feat. Hao Hao! Jiang Shi Girl (Instrumental)"
4.	"Brave (Instrumental)"

=== Limited Edition B ===
CD
No.	Title	Length
1.	"Yie Ar! Jiang Shi feat. Hao Hao! Jiang Shi Girl"
2.	"Brave" (イーアル!キョンシー feat.好好!キョンシーガール)
3.	"Yie Ar! Jiang Shi feat. Hao Hao! Jiang Shi Girl (Remixed by DJ Jet Baron)" (イーアル!キョンシー Ver.FUNKOT ASLI (REMIXED by DJ JET BARON))
4.	"Yie Ar! Jiang Shi feat. Hao Hao! Jiang Shi Girl (Instrumental)"
5.	"Brave (Instrumental)"

Limited Edition B DVD
No.	Title	Length
1.	"Yie Ar! Jiang Shi feat. Hao Hao! Jiang Shi Girl (Music Video)"
2.	"Yie Ar! Jiang Shi feat. Hao Hao! Jiang Shi Girl (Music Video Making)"
3.	"Yie Ar! Jiang Shi feat. Hao Hao! Jiang Shi Girl (Dance Shot ver.)"

== Charts ==
Chart (2012)	Peak position
Japan (Oricon Daily Singles Chart)	4
Japan (Oricon Weekly Singles Chart)	11
