= Taku Suzuki =

Japanese comedian and actor (born 1975)

- 鈴木 拓
- Born: December 7, 1975 (age 50); Ayase, Kanagawa, Japan
- Education: Kanagawa Prefectural Ayase Nishi High School; School JCA
- Occupations: Comedian, actor
- Years active: 1996–present
- Agent: Production Jinrikisha
- Known for: Nogizaka46 Eigo; Con-chan Ten-chan; AKB48 Conto: Nani mo Soko Made...; Mirai Rocket; Hadaka no Taishō; Yūsha Yoshihiko; Irodorihimura; Hell Teacher Nūbē; Mare; Manatsu no Orion; Avatar; San Goranger; Clover
- Relatives: Aoi Miura (niece); Moe Miura (niece)
- Website: Drunk Dragon official profile

Notes
- Same year/generation as: Bad Boys

Taku Suzuki (鈴木 拓, Suzuki Taku; born December 7, 1975) is a Japanese comedian and actor who is part of the comedy duo Drunk Dragon with Muga Tsukaji. He graduated from Kanagawa Prefectural Ayase Nishi High School.

== Biography ==
Suzuki was born in Ayase, Kanagawa, in 1975. According to Shutsubotsu! Adomachikku Tengoku, his family ran a tavern called Kuro Hyōe in Ebina, Kanagawa. Suzuki's cousins are models Aoi Miura and Moe Miura. His grandfather was a member of the House of Representatives.

Suzuki was inspired to become a comedian while browsing through a comedy book in a bookstore. He was admitted to the fifth class of School JCA. Suzuki formed a comedy duo with Muga Tsukaji.

He also engages in independent activities without Tsukaji.

== Filmography ==
=== Television dramas ===
Year	Title	Role	Notes	Ref.
2005	Charming	Street-stall keeper		
2015	Doraemon, Haha ni Naru: Nobuyo Oyama Monogatari	Kaneta Kimotsuki		
2016	Sanada Maru	Jūzō	Taiga drama; cameo	

=== Films ===
Year	Title	Role	Notes
2022	The Fish Tale	Suzuki	

=== Japanese dub ===
- Finding Nemo - Crab
