= Evolution No. 9 =

Single by 9nine

from the album Magi9 Playland
- A-side: "Evolution No. 9"
- B-side: "Just a Koi"; "Anemone mo ne"
- Released: June 12, 2013 (Japan)
- Genre: J-pop
- Label: SME Records

9nine singles chronology
"Colorful" (2013)	"Evolution No. 9" (2013)	"Re:" (2013)

Professional ratings
Review scores
Source	Rating
Billboard Japan	Favorable

"Evolution No. 9" is the 14th single by the Japanese girl idol group 9nine, released in Japan on June 12, 2013, on the label SME Records (a subsidiary of Sony Music Entertainment Japan).

The physical CD single debuted at number 11 in the Oricon weekly singles chart.

== Background ==
The single was released in three versions: Limited Edition A, Limited Edition B, and a regular edition. The limited edition A included a bonus DVD with the music video for the title track, while the limited edition B included a bonus 12-page booklet. Each edition had a different cover.

== Track listing ==
CD
No.	Title	Length
1.	"Evolution No. 9"	3:58
2.	"Just a Koi" (Just A 恋 "Just Love")	4:21
3.	"Anemone mo ne" (アネモネもね "Anemone Too?")	3:01
4.	"Evolution No. 9 (Instrumental)" (アネモネもね)
5.	"Just a Koi (Instrumental)"
6.	"Anemone mo ne (Instrumental)"

Limited Edition A DVD
No.	Title	Length
1.	"Evolution No. 9 (Music Video)" (WANT!（Dance Shot Ver.）)
2.	"Evolution No. 9 (Dance Shot ver.)"

== Charts ==
Chart (2012)	Peak position
Oricon Daily Singles Chart	8
Oricon Weekly Singles Chart	11
