= Harukaze (song) =

Single by Scandal

Single by Scandal
- Released: February 22, 2012
- Genre: Pop rock
- Length: 9:11
- Label: Epic
- Songwriters: Scandal, Noriyasu Isshiki

Scandal singles chronology
"Love Survive" (2011)	"Harukaze" (2012)	"Taiyō Scandalous" (2012)

Music video
- "Harukaze" on YouTube

"Harukaze" is the twelfth major single (15th overall) released by Japanese pop rock band Scandal. It was released in three versions: two limited editions containing different b-sides, and a regular edition. The title track was used as the fifteenth and final opening theme for the anime Bleach. The single reached #6 on the Oricon weekly chart and charted for six weeks, selling 33,095 copies.

== Track listing ==
Normal edition (ESCL-3854)
No.	Title	Lyrics	Music	Length
1.	"Harukaze"	Scandal, Noriyasu Isshiki	Noriyasu Isshiki	4:35
2.	"Harukaze (Instrumental)"	—	Noriyasu Isshiki	4:36
Total length:				9:11

Limited edition A (ESCL-3852)
No.	Title	Lyrics	Music	Length
1.	"Harukaze"	Scandal, Noriyasu Isshiki	Noriyasu Isshiki	4:35
2.	"Alones" (Aqua Timez cover)	Futoshi	Futoshi	4:31
3.	"Harukaze (Instrumental)"	—	Noriyasu Isshiki	4:36
Total length:				13:42

Limited edition B (ESCL-3853)
No.	Title	Lyrics	Music	Length
1.	"Harukaze"	Scandal, Noriyasu Isshiki	Noriyasu Isshiki	4:35
2.	"Asterisk" (Orange Range cover)	Orange Range	Orange Range	4:09
3.	"Harukaze (Instrumental)"	—	Noriyasu Isshiki	4:36
Total length:				13:20
