= Awanai Tsumori no, Genki de ne =

"Awanai Tsumori no, Genki dene"

Single by SCANDAL

from the album Standard
- Released: May 22, 2013
- Genre: J-pop; rock
- Length: 4:25
- Label: EPIC
- Songwriter(s): Ryota Yanagisawa, Keita Kawaguchi

SCANDAL singles chronology
"Pin Heel Surfer" (2012)	"Awanai Tsumori no, Genki dene" (2013)	"Kagen no Tsuki" (2013)

Music video
- "Awanai Tsumori no, Genki de ne" on YouTube

"Awanai Tsumori no, Genki dene" (会わないつもりの、元気でね) is the 15th major single (18th overall) released by the Japanese band SCANDAL. The single was released in three editions: two limited CD+DVD editions and a regular CD only edition. Limited editions also includes a sticker illustrated by Aono Shunju. The title track was used as the theme song to the movie Ore wa Mada Honki Dashitenai Dake. This is the band's second best selling single with 40,361 copies, only surpassed their July 2014 single Yoake no Ryuuseigun.

== Overview ==
The title song is the theme song of the movie "Watashi wa Mada Honkashitai Dake" starring Shinichi Tsutsumi and directed and written by Yuichi Fukuda. It was released in three forms: standard edition, first pressing limited edition A and B. The first pressing of the standard edition includes a photo of SCANDAL members and the message "I'm just not serious yet". The first edition of the regular disc includes one of a total of five types of collaboration stickers featuring SCANDAL member photos and member illustrations drawn by Haruaki Aono, the original author of "Watashi wa wa naze shimashite dakeda nai" (I'm still not serious yet), at random. The limited first edition includes a sticker of SCANDAL illustration drawn by Haruaki Aono, the original writer of "I'm just not serious yet".

== Track listing ==
CD ESCL-4060
No.	Title	Lyrics	Music	Length
1.	"Awanai Tsumori no, Genki dene" (会わないつもりの、元気でね; I Don't Plan on Seeing You Again, Take Care)	Ryota Yanagisawa	Ryota Yanagisawa, Keita Kawaguchi	4:25
2.	"24 Jikan Plus no Yoake Mae" (24時間プラスの夜明け前; 24 Hours Plus Before Dawn)	Kumiko Takahashi	Noriyasu Isshiki, Keita Kawaguchi	4:02
3.	"Awanai Tsumori no, Genki de ne (instrumental)" (会わないつもりの、元気でね; I Don't Plan on Seeing You Again)	—	Ryota Yanagisawa, Keita Kawaguchi	4:22
Total length:				12:49

Limited edition type A DVD track list (ESCL-4056/70)
No.	Title	Length
1.	"Instructional DVD from the Members"	—
Total length:		—

Limited edition type B DVD track list (ESCL-4058/9)
No.	Title	Length
1.	"Guerilla Live held the day before the concert at Osaka-Jo Hall"	—
Total length:		—

== Charts ==
Chart performance for "Awanai Tsumori no, Genki de ne"
Chart (2013)	Peak position
Japan (Oricon)	4
