= Nana Maru San Batsu =

Japanese manga and anime series

- 7O3X Fastest Finger First
- Cover of the first volume featuring Mari.

ナナマル サンバツ (Nanamaru Sanbatsu)
- Genre: Comedy, sports (quiz bowl)
- Manga
- Written by: Iqura Sugimoto
- Published by: Kadokawa Shoten
- Magazine: Young Ace
- Original run: 2010 – 2020
- Volumes: 20
- Anime television series
- Directed by: Masaki Ōzora
- Produced by: Marina Sasaki; Takeshi Yamakawa; Motohiro Oda; Daisuke Masaki
- Written by: Yuuko Kakihara
- Music by: Hajime Hyakkoku
- Studio: TMS Entertainment; Double Eagle
- Licensed by: Crunchyroll
- Original network: Nippon TV (AnichU)
- Original run: July 4, 2017 – September 19, 2017
- Episodes: 12

Nana Maru San Batsu (ナナマル サンバツ; lit. "7 Right, 3 Wrong", also known as 7O3X), called Fastest Finger First in English, is a Japanese manga series by Iqura Sugimoto. An anime television series adaptation by TMS Entertainment aired from July 4 to September 19, 2017.

== Plot ==
The daily life of Shiki Koshiyama, as he joins the Quiz Bowl Circle club with his classmate Mari Fukami to partake in Quiz bowl matches during his freshman year in high school.

== Characters ==
=== Buzō Prefectural High School ===
Shiki Koshiyama (越山 識, Koshiyama Shiki)
Voiced by: Shun Horie
Mari Fukami (深見 真理, Fukami Mari)
Voiced by: Umika Kawashima
Gakuto Sasajima (笹島 学人, Sasajima Gakuto)
Voiced by: Takuya Satō
Daisuke Inoue (井上 大将, Inoue Daisuke)
Voiced by: Tasuku Hatanaka
Jinko Sasajima (笹島 迅子, Sasajima Jinko)
Voiced by: Satsumi Matsuda
Yoshikatsu Kuroda (黒田 良勝, Kuroda Yoshikatsu)
Voiced by: Shuuhei Iwase

=== Miyaura High School ===
Chisato Mikuriya (御来屋 千智, Mikuriya Chisato)
Voiced by: Kaito Ishikawa
Yōsuke Ashiya (芦屋 洋介, Ashiya Yōsuke)
Voiced by: Wataru Hatano
Wataru Maruyama (丸山 亘, Maruyama Wataru)
Voiced by: Taku Yashiro
Ryōta Mukai (向井 亮太, Mukai Ryōta)
Voiced by: Yusuke Shirai

=== Asagaoka High School ===
Yuki Kōzuki (上月 由貴, Kōzuki Yuki)
Voiced by: M.A.O
Chiaki Sonohara (苑原 千明, Sonohara Chiaki)
Voiced by: Ayane Sakura
Fumika Kenmochi (剣持 文伽, Kenmochi Fumika)
Voiced by: Hisako Tōjō
Tamami Kogawa (古河 珠美, Kogawa Tamami)
Voiced by: Haruna Momono

=== Sekigawata High School ===
Takumi Niina (新名 匠, Niina Takumi)
Voiced by: Tatsuhisa Suzuki
Toichirō Nakazawa (中澤 藤一郎, Nakazawa Toichirō)
Voiced by: Genki Muro
Hajime Sasaki (佐々木 一, Sasaki Hajime)
Voiced by: Yoshitaka Yamaya

=== Kaijō High School ===
Kunimitsu Ōkura (大蔵 邦光, Ōkura Kunimtisu)
Voiced by: Tomoaki Maeno
Seiji Fukami (深見 誠司, Fukami Seiji)
Voiced by: Hikaru Midorikawa
Haruomi Konoe (近衛 春臣, Konoe Haruomi)
Voiced by: Toshiki Masuda
Masaru Shibata (柴田 勝, Shibata Masaru)
Voiced by: Junya Enoki

=== Other characters ===
Minoru Hanabusa (花房 ミノル, Hanabusa Minoru)
Voiced by: Daisuke Kishio
Kotaro Tozuka (戸塚 光太郎, Tozuka Kotaro)
Voiced by: Makoto Furukawa
Sei Koshiyama
Voiced by: Aki Nagao

== Media ==
=== Manga ===
It was serialized in Kadokawa Shoten's seinen manga magazine Young Ace from 2010 to 2020. Twenty tankōbon volumes were published.

No.	Release date	ISBN
1	April 27, 2011	978-4-04-715689-0
2	August 2, 2011	978-4-04-715749-1
3	March 1, 2012	978-4-04-120125-1
4	August 31, 2012	978-4-04-715749-1
5	April 2, 2013	978-4-04-120626-3
6	August 31, 2013	978-4-04-120826-7
7	December 28, 2013	978-4-04-120941-7
8	July 4, 2014	978-4-04-101530-8
9	December 29, 2014	978-4-04-101531-5
10	July 4, 2015	978-4-04-101530-8
11	December 4, 2015	978-4-04-102870-4
12	August 4, 2016	978-4-04-104281-6
13	December 31, 2016	978-4-04-105038-5
14	July 4, 2017	978-4-04-105790-2
15	March 2, 2018	978-4-04-105791-9
16	October 4, 2018	978-4-04-105791-9
17	March 4, 2019	978-4-04-107158-8
18	October 4, 2019	978-4-04-108588-2
19	October 2, 2020	978-4-04-108589-9
20	November 4, 2020	978-4-04-110705-8

=== Anime ===
An anime television series adaptation is produced by TMS Entertainment with Masaki Ōzora directing, Yuuko Kakihara supervised the anime's scripts and Makoto Takahoko drew the character designs. It aired from July 4 to September 19, 2017, on Nippon TV's AnichU programming block. The opening theme is "On My MiND" by Mrs. Green Apple and the ending theme is "◯◯◯◯◯" by Baby Raids Japan. The series ran for 12 episodes. Crunchyroll streamed the series.

No.	Title (Note: All English titles are taken from Crunchyroll.)	Original release date
1	"Don't You Want to Become a Quiz King?"; Transliteration: "Kimi mo Kuizu-ō ni Naranai ka?" (Japanese: キミもクイズ王にならないか？)	July 4, 2017
2	"A Matter of 0.01 Seconds?!"; Transliteration: "0.01 Byō no Sekai!?" (Japanese: 0.01秒の世界！？)	July 11, 2017
3	"If You Want the Right to Answer /"; Transliteration: "Kaitō-ken ga Hoshikereba/" (Japanese: 解答権が欲しければ /)	July 18, 2017
4	"A Mysterious Beauty Appears,"; Transliteration: "Nazo no Bishōjo Tōjō desu ga," (Japanese: 謎の美少女登場ですが、)	July 25, 2017
5	"Buzou vs Miyaura! Ding!"; Transliteration: "Buzō vs Miyanoura! Pikōn" (Japanese: 文蔵 vs 宮浦！ピコーン♪)	August 1, 2017
6	"A. Maid B. Lieutenant Colonel C. Little Devil"; Transliteration: "A. Meido B. Chūsa C. Koakuma" (Japanese: A.メイド B.チュウサ C.コアクマ)	August 8, 2017
7	"...Their Past Quiz Questions"; Transliteration: "... Futari no Kako Toi" (Japanese: ……ふたりの過去問)	July 4, 2017
8	"\Greetings/ Asagaoka Regular Meet!"; Transliteration: "\Gokigenyō/ Asagaoka Reikai!" (Japanese: \ ごきげんよう / 麻ヶ丘例会！)	July 4, 2017
9	"High Road x Low Road"; Transliteration: "Ōdō × Jadō" (Japanese: 王道×邪道)	August 29, 2017
10	"The Unparalleled Super Ace"; Transliteration: "Tobikiri no Chō Ēsu-sama" (Japanese: とびきりの超エース様☆)	September 5, 2017
11	"Q: Why Do You Answer?"; Transliteration: "Q. Naze Kotaeru no ka?" (Japanese: Q.なぜ答えるのか?)	September 12, 2017
12	"A: Because the Question Is There!"; Transliteration: "A. Soko ni kuizu ga aru kara!" (Japanese: A.そこにクイズがあるから！)	September 19, 2017

=== Stage Play ===
The manga has inspired 2 live-action stage play adaptation which had run in May 2018, with a third play to run in January 2021.
