= Yumemiru Tsubasa =

Single by Scandal

from the album Best Scandal
- Released: October 14, 2009
- Genre: J-pop; rock
- Length: 3:47
- Label: Epic
- Songwriter(s): Scandal, Aiji Hayama, Sachio Kubota

Scandal singles chronology
"Shōjo S" (2009)	"Yumemiru Tsubasa" (2009)	"Shunkan Sentimental" (2010)

Music video
- "Yumemiru Tsubasa" on YouTube

"Yumemiru Tsubasa" (夢見るつばさ) is the fourth major single (seventh overall) released by Japanese pop rock band Scandal. The title track is an answer song to Hillbilly Bops' 1988 song "Yumemiru Koro wo Sugitemo". It was also used as the October 2009 opening theme for NTV's "Ongaku Senshi Music Fighter". The first B-side, "BEAUTeen!!", also received promotion as a radio single. The second B-side, "Daydream", is a Judy and Mary cover that was previously released on a tribute album for their fifteenth anniversary. The single reached #12 on the Oricon weekly chart and charted for three weeks, selling 7,450 copies.

== Track listing ==
CD (ESCL-3292)
No.	Title	Lyrics	Music	Length
1.	"Yumemiru Tsubasa" (夢見るつばさ; Dreaming of Wings)	Scandal, Aiji Hayama, Sachio Kubota	Sachio Kubota	3:47
2.	"BEAUTeen!!"	Tomomi Ogawa, Kyon	Youtorilon	3:43
3.	"Daydream" (Judy and Mary cover)	Yuki	Yoshihito Onda	4:07
4.	"Yumemiru Tsubasa (Instrumental)" (夢見るつばさ)	—	Sachio Kubota	3:47
5.	"BEAUTeen!! (Instrumental)"	—	Youtorilon	3:42
Total length:				19:06
