= Natsu Wanna Say Love U =

Single by 9nine

from the album 9nine
- A-side: "Natsu Wanna Say Love U"
- B-side: "Wonderful World"; "Too Blue"
- Released: July 20, 2011 (Japan)
- Genre: J-pop
- Length: 2:49
- Label: SME Records

9nine singles chronology
"Shining Star" (2011)	"Natsu Wanna Say Love U" (2011)	"Tick Tock 2Nite" (2011)

Professional ratings
Review scores
Source	Rating
Hotexpress	Favorable

"Natsu Wanna Say Love U" (夏 wanna say love U) is the 7th single by the Japanese girl idol group 9nine, released in Japan on July 20, 2011, on the label SME Records (a subsidiary of Sony Music Entertainment Japan).

The physical CD single debuted at number 15 in the Oricon weekly singles chart.

== Background ==
The single was released in three versions: two limited editions (Limited Edition A and Limited Edition B) and a regular edition. Both limited editions included a bonus DVD with two versions of the music video for the title track and a different making-of video. Each edition had a different cover.

== Track listing ==
CD
No.	Title	Length
1.	"Natsu Wanna Say Love U" (夏 wanna say love U)	4:23
2.	"Wonderful World"	3:49
3.	"Too Blue" (too blue)	4:37

Limited Edition A DVD
No.	Title	Length
1.	"Natsu Wanna Say Love U (Music Video)"
2.	"Natsu Wanna Say Love U (Music Video Making)"
3.	"Natsu Wanna Say Love U (Full Dance ver.)"

Limited Edition B DVD
No.	Title	Length
1.	"Natsu Wanna Say Love U (Music Video)"
2.	"Natsu Wanna Say Love U (CD Jacket Making)"
3.	"Natsu Wanna Say Love U (Full Dance ver.)"

== Charts ==
Chart (2011)	Peak position
Japan (Oricon Daily Singles Chart)	9
Japan (Oricon Weekly Singles Chart)	15
