= Haruka (Scandal song) =

Single by Scandal

from the album Baby Action
- Released: April 20, 2011
- Genre: J-pop; pop rock
- Length: 17:22
- Label: Epic Records Japan
- Songwriter(s): Haruna Ono, Hidenori Tanaka

Scandal singles chronology
"Pride" (2011)	"Haruka" (2011)	"Love Survive" (2011)

Music video
- "Haruka" on YouTube

"Haruka" (ハルカ) is the tenth major single (13th overall) by Japanese pop rock band Scandal, released in April 2011. It was released in three versions: a limited CD+DVD edition type A, a limited CD+DVD edition type B, and a regular CD-only edition. The title track was used as the theme song for the animated film Tofu Kozō. First pressings of the limited editions came with a button badge and a greeting event ticket, while first pressings of the regular edition came with a Tofu Kozō wide cap sticker, a special booklet, and a greeting event ticket. The single reached number 3 on the Oricon weekly chart and charted for ten weeks, selling 31,694 copies.

== Theme for Windows 8 ==
"Haruka" was re-released on October 23, 2012, with a different cover, when the single's second track, "Satisfaction", was used as the theme for a Windows 8 TV commercial.

== Track listing ==
CD (ESCL-3664)
No.	Title	Lyrics	Music	Length
1.	"Haruka" (ハルカ; Distant)	Haruna, Hidenori Tanaka	Hidenori Tanaka	5:05
2.	"Satisfaction" (サティスファクション)	Tomomi, Junko, Atsushi	Junko, Atsushi	3:08
3.	"Want You"	Mami	Mami	3:52
4.	"Haruka (Instrumental)" (ハルカ)	—	Hidenori Tanaka	5:17
Total length:				17:22

Limited edition DVD A (ESCL-3661)
No.	Title	Length
1.	"Haruka (Tofu Kozō Special Music Video)" (ハルカ (「豆富小僧」スペシャル・ミュージック・ビデオ))	5:17
Total length:		6:55

Limited edition DVD B (ESCL-3663)
No.	Title	Length
1.	"Cute! (Scandal meets Cinnamoroll ver.) music video" (CUTE! (Scandal meets シナモン ver.))	4:38
Total length:		6:55
