= Kanae Yoshii =

Japanese idol, actress and singer

Kanae Yoshii 吉井 香奈恵
- Born: April 8, 1993 (age 33); Osaka Prefecture, Japan
- Occupations: Singer, actress
- Years active: 2010–2019
- Label: Sony Music Japan
- Formerly of: 9nine
- Website: www.lespros.co.jp/artists/kanae_yoshii/

Kanae Yoshii (吉井 香奈恵, Yoshii Kanae; born April 8, 1993 in Osaka Prefecture) often called Kan-chan (かんちゃん), is a Japanese idol, singer and actress. She is a former member of the Japanese girl group 9nine.

== Filmography ==
=== Musical ===
- Macross The Musicalture (October 3–8, 2012)

=== TV drama ===
- Hao-Hao! Kyonshi Girl (TV Tokyo, October 12 - December 21, 2012)
