= Uki Satake =

Japanese singer, actress and radio host

- 佐武 宇綺
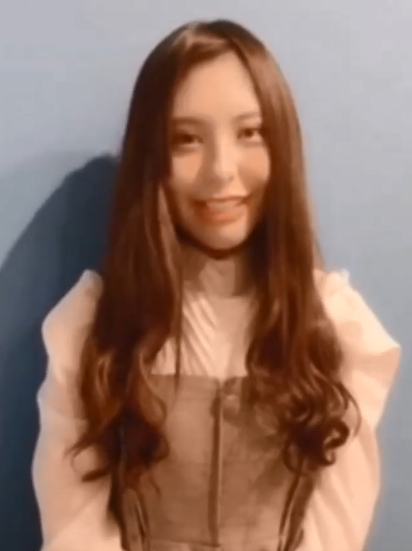
- Born: March 8, 1992 (age 34); Tokyo, Japan
- Occupations: Singer; actress; radio host
- Years active: 2005–present
- Height: 157 cm (5 ft 2 in)
- Musical career
- Genres: Pop
- Instruments: Vocals; bass
- Label: SME Records
- Member of: 9nine

Uki Satake (佐武 宇綺, Satake Uki; born March 8, 1992), often called Ukky (うっきー), is a Japanese singer, actress and radio host. She is a member of Japanese girl group 9nine.

== Filmography ==
Satake has her own radio show, Satake Uki no Utyu wo Kirei ni Suru Radio, since July 3, 2012. The show is currently airing every Sunday on Japan's Nippon Broadcasting System, in which she often plays her own renditions of 9nine's songs as well as songs by other artists.

=== TV drama ===
- Wagahai wa shufu de aru (TBS, 2006)
- Kaijoken Musashi -gakkō he ikō!- (Fuji TV, 2007)
- Koizora (TBS, 2008)
- Chōdōken ga oshiete kureta chikara -Asunaro gakkō no monogatari- (TBS, 2009)
- Boku no himitsu heiki (NBN, 2009)
- Kaibutsu-kun (NTV, 2010)
- Atsuizo!Nekogaya!! (NBN, 2010)
- Hao-Hao! Kyonshi Girl (TV Tokyo, 2012)
- Soratobu kōhōshitsu (TBS, 2013)

=== Anime ===
- Rainbow - Nisha Rokubō no Shichinin (NTV, 2010) Satake Wukipedia
- Chihayafuru (NTV, 2013) schoolgirl
- Hunter × Hunter (2011 anime) (NTV, 2013) Podungo Lapoy, Kite (Chimera ant)
- Space Dandy (Tokyo MX, 2014) QT
- The World Is Still Beautiful (NTV, 2014) Mikia
- Space Dandy II (Tokyo MX, 2014) QT
- Terror in Resonance (Fuji TV, 2014) Mobko
- Soreike! Anpanman (NTV, 2014) Cat girl
- Doraemon (2005 anime) (TV Asahi, 2015) Sheep Conductor
- Mob Psycho 100 (Tokyo MX, 2016) Tsubomi Takane
- Crayon Shin-chan Spin-off (2016) Ellen Tadano
- Carole & Tuesday (Fuji TV, 2019) IDEA, Angela's rabbit doll
- Mob Psycho 100 III (2022) Tsubomi Takane
- Uzumaki (2024) Kirie Goshima
- Lazarus (2025) Celebrity Singer
