= Koi Moyō =

Single by Scandal

from the album Yah! Yah! Yah! Hello Scandal: Maido! Scandal Desu! Yah Yah Yah!
- Released: April 4, 2008
- Genre: J-pop; rock
- Length: 3:44
- Label: Kitty
- Songwriter(s): Haruna Ono

Scandal singles chronology
"Space Ranger" (2008)	"Koi Moyō" (2008)	"Kagerō" (2008)

Koi Moyō" (恋模様) is the second indie single released by Japanese pop rock band Scandal. It was limited to 2,000 copies, came in a CD+DVD format only, and was exclusive to Tower Records in Japan. It was sold on Scandal's United States tour. The title track was used as the theme song for the movie "Corazon de Melon". The single reached #150 on the Oricon weekly chart and charted for two weeks, selling 686 copies. The DVD contains footage of Scandal recording "Space Ranger" in studio.

== Track listing ==
=== CD ===
All lyrics are written by HARUNA; all music is composed by MASTERWORKS

CD (KTCD-2002)
No.	Title	Length
1.	"Koi Moyō" (恋模様; Love Pattern)	3:44

=== DVD ===
DVD
No.	Title	Length
1.	"Space Ranger studio recording" (スペースレンジャー)	3:29
