= Umika Kawashima =

Japanese actress and singer (1994)

- 川島 海荷
- Born: March 3, 1994 (age 32); Niiza, Saitama Prefecture, Japan
- Education: Meiji University
- Occupations: Actress; voice actress; singer
- Years active: 2006–present
- Height: 155 cm (5 ft 1 in)
- Spouse: Katsumi Nakamura (m. 2024)
- Musical career
- Instrument: Vocals
- Years active: 2005–2019
- Label: Sony Music Japan
- Formerly of: 9nine; meg rock

Umika Kawashima (川島 海荷, Kawashima Umika; born March 3, 1994) is a Japanese actress, voice actress and singer. She is a former member of the Japanese girl group 9nine. Her solo single "Maji de Koi Suru 5 Byō Mae/Ichigo Iro no Kimochi", on the Watashi no Yasashikunai Senpai soundtrack, reached #46 on the Oricon chart. As an actress, she played in numerous Japanese TV series and movies.

== Biography ==
Umika Kawashima was born in the Saitama Prefecture. She was scouted in Shibuya when she was in 6th grade and joined Lespros Entertainment. The actresses she idolizes are Aoi Miyazaki, Yui Aragaki and Kou Shibasaki. She has stated that she would like to collaborate with Masaharu Fukuyama. She graduated from the Faculty of Arts and Letters at Meiji University with a degree in psychology in 2016.

== Career ==
Since 2006, Kawashima has appeared in numerous television dramas and movies. In 2007 she joined the female idol group 9nine, however she announced her graduation from the group in 2016 to focus on her acting career. She appeared for her final performance with the group during "9nine LIVE 2016", BEST 9 Tour" after being with the group for nine and a half years. Early 2016, it was announced that Kawashima would become a regular alongside Masu Taichi on the television program ZIP!. Kawashima commented, "Now is the time to move forward. I want to present an exciting program without any accidents." She receives her first leading role as a voice actress in the 2017 summer anime series, Nana Maru San Batsu.

== Personal life ==
In December 23, 2024, Kawashima and Olympic competitive swimmer Katsumi Nakamura, jointly announced that they had married.

== Filmography ==
=== TV dramas ===
Year	Title	Role	Notes	Ref.
2006	Dare Yorimo Mama wo Ai su	Tomo Sanada		
2006	Yakusha Damashii	Sakurako Fukada		
2007	Iryu 2	Kana Takami		
2007	Code Blue	Miki Kuriyama		
2008	Bloody Monday	Haruka Takagi		
2009	Kiina	Yukino Fukada		
2009	Aishiteru	Mihoko Ozawa		
2010	Bloody Monday 2	Haruka Takagi		
2010	Kaibutsu-kun	Utako Ichikawa		
2010	99-nen no Ai ~ Japanese Americans	Sachie Hiramatsu		
2011	Heaven's Flower	Ai		
2011	Hanawake no Yon Shimai	Mai Yonemoto		
2011	Kokosei Restaurant	Ume Hanawa		
2011	Kaibutsu-kun Special	Utako Ichikawa		
2012	Hanayome	Yoko Katakura		
2012	Papadol!	Mei Hanamura		
2013	Pintokona	Ayame Chiba		
2013	Keizoku 2: SPEC~Rei	Maho Ueno		
2014	Kabuka Boraku	Yuki Todo		
2016	Arechi no Koi	Yuariko Kitazawa		
2016	Asa ga Kuru	Hikari Katakura		
2017	Blazing Transfer Students	Hikari		
2019	Idaten	Yasuko	Taiga drama	
2022	One Night Morning	Komugi	Lead role; episode 6	

=== Films ===
Year	Title	Role	Notes	Ref.
2007	Life: Tengoku de Kimi ni Aetara	Iijima Konatsu		
2009	Keitai Kareshi	Satomi Ueno		
2010	Watashi no Yasashikunai Senpai	Yamako Iriomote		
2011	Hoshi Mamoru Inu	Yuki Kawamura		
2011	Kaibutsu-kun The Movie	Pirari / Utako Ichikawa		

=== Television animation ===
Year	Title	Role	Notes	Ref.
2017	Nana Maru San Batsu	Mari Fukami		

=== Dubbing ===
- Hotel Transylvania, Mavis Dracula
- Hotel Transylvania 2, Mavis Dracula
- Hotel Transylvania 3: Summer Vacation, Mavis Dracula
- Hotel Transylvania: Transformania, Mavis Dracula

== Awards ==
- 2009: The 2nd Tokyo Drama Awards: Best Newcomer Award
- 2010: The 23rd Japan Best Dressed Eyes Awards Special Prize
- 2013: The 24th Best Jewelry Dresser in Japan (section of teens)
