= Love Survive =

Single by Scandal

from the album Baby Action
- Released: July 27, 2011
- Genre: J-pop
- Length: 15:34
- Label: Epic
- Songwriter(s): HARUNA, Hidenori Tanaka

Scandal singles chronology
"Haruka" (2011)	"Love Survive" (2011)	"Harukaze" (2012)

Music video
- "Love Survive" on YouTube

"Love Survive" is a Japanese-language song, and the eleventh major single (14th overall) released, by Japanese pop rock band Scandal. The song begins "Harii harii aseru koigokoro / Surourii surourii kimi wo matsu jikan".

The first press edition came with a special booklet and a button badge limited to select shops. A sticker featuring a single member was also given to purchasers from Tower Records, HMV, Tsutaya, and Shinseido. The single reached #11 on the Oricon weekly chart and charted for four weeks, selling 17,250 copies.

== Track listing ==
CD (ESCL-3740)
No.	Title	Lyrics	Music	Length
1.	"Love Survive"	HARUNA, Hidenori Tanaka	Hidenori Tanaka	3:42
2.	"Kimi ni Shittochuu" (君に嫉妬中; Jealous of You)	Hajimetal	Hajimetal	3:49
3.	"Hikare" (ひかれ)	RINA	MAMI	4:21
4.	"Love Survive (Instrumental)"	—	Hidenori Tanaka	3:42
Total length:				15:34
