= Moe Miura =

Japanese model, actress, and idol (born 1992)

- 三浦 萌
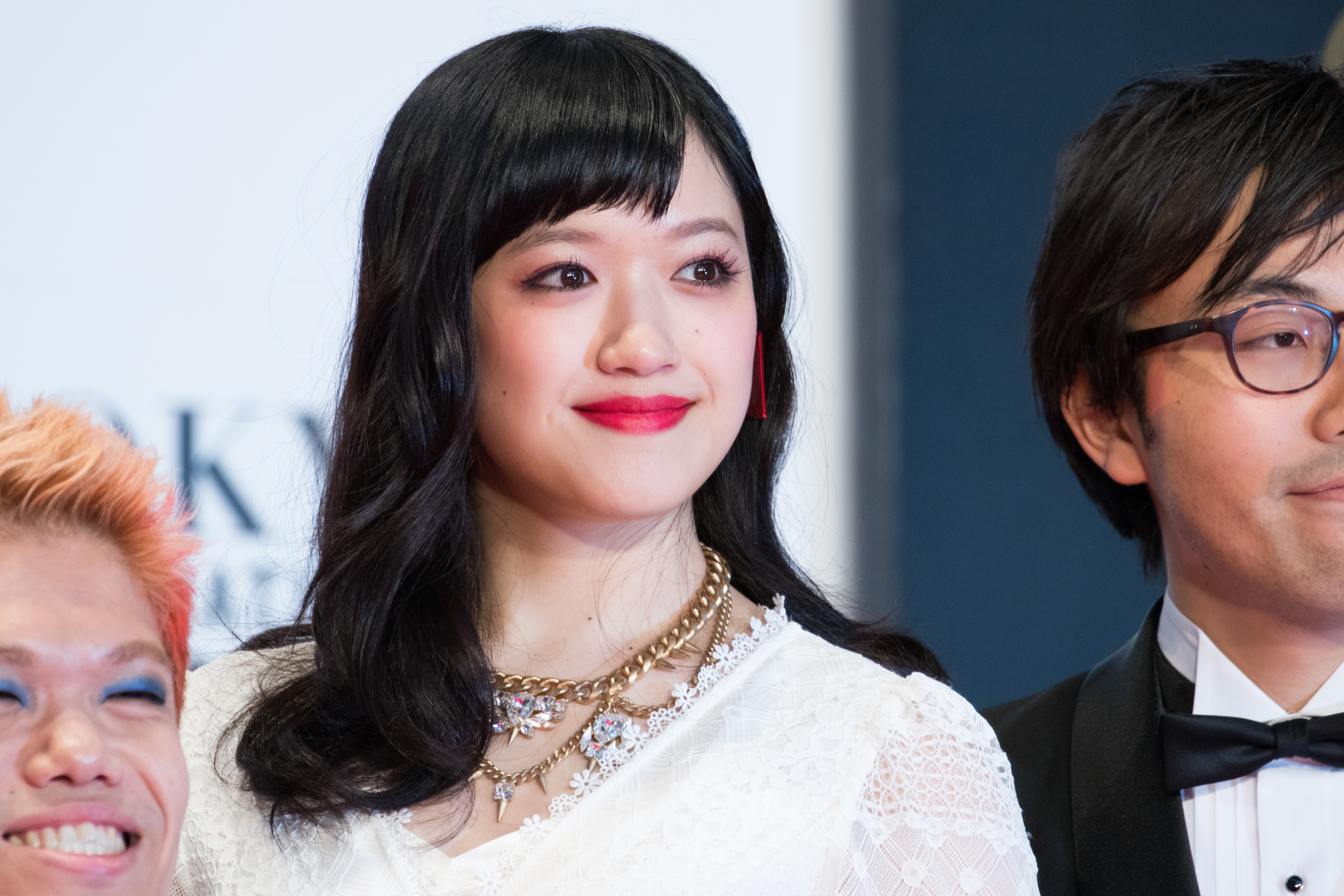
- Born: Fukushima Prefecture, Japan
- Occupations: Model, actress
- Height: 1.63 m (5 ft 4 in) (2013)
- Relatives: Aoi Miura (sister)

Moe Miura (三浦 萌, Miura Moe, in Fukushima Prefecture, Japan) is a Japanese model and actress. She is a former member of 9nine.

== Biography ==
On March 1, 2005, Miura was a new model for the teen magazine, Hanachu, and later graduated on January 31, 2009.

In September 2005, she was a member of 9nine, and left in August 2010.

From July 1, 2013, Miura became a member of Our Songs Creative of K-Dash.

== Filmography ==
=== Drama ===
Year	Title	Role	Network	Notes
2007	24 no Hitomi	Mayumi Suga	TBS	
2007	Biyō Shōnen Celebrity	Ako Horibe	TV Tokyo	Episodes 5 and 6
2009	Real Clothes	Kinue's friend from high school	Kansai	Episode 2
2013	Yae no Sakura	Maid	NHK	

=== Variety ===
Year	Title	Network	Notes
2003	15-0 Fifteen Love	BS Asahi	
2009	Vanilla Kibun!	Fuji TV	

=== Other TV series ===
Year	Title	Network	Notes
2003	Junior de Go!	Enta!371	
2004	Media no ABC	NHK E	
2004	Jeicheki	Enta!371	

=== Films ===
Year	Title	Role	Notes
2005	Memories of Matsuko		
2008	Aoi Tori	Megumi Kimura	
2010	Re:Play-Girls	Wakana	

=== Theater ===
Year	Title	Role	Notes
2012	Himawari no Sorane	Fortune teller	

=== Advertisements ===
Year	Title	Notes
2007	Asahi Soft Drinks Mitsuya Cider "Haru Hen"	

=== Internet distributions ===
Year	Title	Role	Notes
2008	Six Days	Osamuai Satomura	
