= Temptation Box =

Studio album by Scandal
- Released: August 11, 2010
- Recorded: 2010
- Genre: Pop rock; alternative rock; dance rock
- Length: 49:00
- Language: Japanese
- Label: Epic Records Japan

Scandal chronology
Best Scandal (2009)	Temptation Box (2010)	Baby Action (2011)

Singles from Temptation Box
- 1. "Shunkan Sentimental" Released: February 3, 2010; 2. "Taiyō to Kimi ga Egaku Story" Released: June 2, 2010; 3. "Namida no Regret" Released: July 28, 2010

Temptation Box is the second studio album by the Japanese band Scandal, released on August 11, 2010. The album was released in three editions, including a photo book photographed and produced by Mika Ninagawa, and the first press limited edition comes with a DVD. The album reached No. 3 on the Oricon chart on its first week and charted for 13 weeks with 60,301 copies sold.

== Track listing ==
No.	Title	Lyrics	Music	Arrangement	Length
1.	"Everybody Say Yeah"	Tomomi, Bun Onoe	Tomohiro Okubo	Keita Kawaguchi	3:43
2.	"Taiyou to Kimi ga Egaku Story" (太陽と君が描くStory; The Story You and the Sun Drew)	Tomomi, Hidenori Tanaka	Tanaka	Takeshi Fujii, Kawaguchi	3:57
3.	"Shunkan Sentimental" (瞬間センチメンタル; Sentimental Moment)	SCANDAL, Natsumi Kobayashi	Yuichi Tajika	Kawaguchi	3:44
4.	"Houkago 1H" (放課後1H; 1H(our) After School)	Tomomi, Sarasa Ifu	Yasuhiro Minami (Microman)	Minami	4:01
5.	"Namida no Regret" (涙のリグレット; Tears of Regret)	Hisashi Kondo	Miki Watanabe	Watanabe	5:12
6.	"Hi-Hi-Hi"	Tomomi	Tajika	Kawaguchi	3:13
7.	"Shoujo M" (少女M; Minority Girl)	Mami, Tajika	Tajika	Tajika, Kawaguchi	3:55
8.	"GIRLism"	Tomomi, Onoe	Okubo	Okubo	2:53
9.	"Playboy Part II" (プレイボーイ Part II)	Rina	Tadashi Tsukida	Kawaguchi	4:20
10.	"Hello! Hello!"	SCANDAL, Tanaka	Tanaka	Kawaguchi	4:28
11.	"Aitai" (会いたい; I Want to See You)	Haruna, Onoe	Okubo	Okubo	5:04
12.	"Sayonara My Friend" (さよなら My Friend; Goodbye My Friend)	Tomomi, Hiroshi Inui	Inui	Kawaguchi	4:30

DVD edition bonus videos
No.	Title	Length
1.	"Shunkan Sakura Zensen Tour (2010 Spring) Digest Movie"
2.	"Scandal Summit Vol. 1-2 Highlights"

== Personnel ==
- HARUNA (Haruna Ono) - lead vocals, rhythm guitar
- MAMI (Mami Sasazaki) - lead guitar, vocals
- TOMOMI (Tomomi Ogawa) - bass, vocals
- RINA (Rina Suzuki) - drums, vocals
