= Pin Heel Surfer =

"Pin Heel Surfer ピンヒールサーファー"

Single by Scandal

from the album Queens Are Trumps
- Released: September 12, 2012
- Genre: Pop rock
- Label: Epic Records Japan
- Songwriter: Sho Wada

Scandal singles chronology
"Taiyō Scandalous" (2012)	"Pin Heel Surfer ピンヒールサーファー" (2012)	"Awanai Tsumori no, Genki de ne" (2013)

Music video
- "Pin Heel Surfer" on YouTube

"Pin Heel Surfer" is a song, and the fourteenth major single (17th overall) released, by the Japanese band Scandal. The first track was produced by Triceratops. The single reached #9 on the Oricon weekly charts on its first week and charted for 3 weeks, selling 13,585 copies.

== Track listing ==
CD (ESCL-3740)
No.	Title	Lyrics	Music	Length
1.	"Pin Heel Surfer (Japanese lyrics)" (ピンヒールサーファー)	Sho Wada	Sho Wada	—
2.	"Osaka"	Scandal, Masterworks	Masterworks	—
3.	"Pin Heel Surfer (Instrumental)" ((ピンヒールサーファー))	—	Sho Wada	—
Total length:				—
