= Cross Over (song) =

Single by 9nine

from the album 9nine
- A-side: "Cross Over"
- B-side: "Material World"; "119"
- Released: December 1, 2010 (Japan)
- Genre: J-pop
- Label: SME Records

9nine singles chronology
"Hikari no Kage" (2010)	"Cross Over" (2010)	"Shining Star" (2011)

"Cross Over" is the fifth single by the Japanese girl idol group 9nine. It was released in Japan on December 1, 2010, on the label SME Records (a subsidiary of Sony Music Entertainment Japan).

The physical CD single debuted at number 25 in the Oricon weekly singles chart.

== Background ==
The song "Cross Over" was the ending theme of the first half of the first and only season of the Japanese anime television series Star Driver (STAR DRIVER 輝きのタクト).

== Release ==
The single was released in three versions: a regular edition, a limited edition, and a Star Driver edition. Each version had a different cover. The limited edition A included a bonus DVD with the music video for the title track.

== Track listing ==
CD
No.	Title	Length
1.	"Cross Over"	4:47
2.	"Material World" (マテリアルワールド)	4:52
3.	"119"	4:02

Limited Edition DVD
No.	Title	Length
1.	"Cross Over (Music Video)"

== Charts ==
Chart (2010)	Peak position
Japan (Oricon Daily Singles Chart)	17
Japan (Oricon Weekly Singles Chart)	25
