= Shōjo S =

Single by Scandal

Single by Scandal

from the album Best Scandal
- Released: March 13, 2009
- Genre: J-pop; hard rock
- Length: 12:00
- Label: Epic
- Songwriters: Tomomi Ogawa, Yuichi Tajika

Scandal singles chronology
"Sakura Goodbye" (2009)	"Shōjo S" (2009)	"Yumemiru Tsubasa" (2009)

Music video
- "Shōjo S" on YouTube

"Shōjo S" (少女S) is the third major single (sixth overall) released by Japanese pop rock band Scandal. The title track was used as the tenth opening theme for the anime Bleach, as well as the opening song for the Nintendo DS game Bleach DS 4th: Flame Bringer. The single was released in three versions: two limited editions and a regular edition, all with different track lists. Limited edition A came with a Bleach notebook while limited edition B came with a fold-out poster of Scandal on one side and Bleach on the reverse. Both limited versions came with a Bleach sticker. The single reached #6 on the Oricon weekly chart and charted for thirteen weeks. Because it sold 33,881 copies in 2009, it was the #194 single of that year. It was certified gold by the RIAJ for selling over 100,000 digital copies in August 2009.

== Track listing ==
Normal edition (ESCL-3216)
No.	Title	Lyrics	Music	Length
1.	"Shōjo S" (少女S; Girls)	Tomomi Ogawa	Yuichi Tajika	3:11
2.	"Natsu Neiro" (ナツネイロ; Summer Tone)	Rina Suzuki, Natsumi Kobayashi	MASTERWORKS	4:33
3.	"Future"	Scandal, Natsumi Kobayashi	Takeo Asami	3:36
Total length:				11:20

Limited edition A (ESCL-3214)
No.	Title	Lyrics	Music	Length
1.	"Shōjo S" (少女S; Girls)	TOMOMI	Yuichi Tajika	3:11
2.	"Natsu Neiro" (ナツネイロ; Summer Tone)	RINA, Natsumi Kobayashi	MASTERWORKS	4:33
3.	"So Easy"	Scandal, Natsumi Kobayashi	mitsubaco	3:36
4.	"Shōjo S (Instrumental)" (少女S; Girls)	—	Yuichi Tajika	3:11
Total length:				14:31

Limited edition B (ESCL-3215)
No.	Title	Lyrics	Music	Length
1.	"Shōjo S" (少女S; Girls)	TOMOMI	Yuichi Tajika	3:11
2.	"Natsu Neiro" (ナツネイロ; Summer Tone)	RINA, Natsumi Kobayashi	MASTERWORKS	4:33
3.	"Future"	Scandal, Natsumi Kobayashi	Takeo Asami	3:36
4.	"Shōjo S (Instrumental)" (少女S; Girls)	—	Yuichi Tajika	3:11
Total length:				14:31
