= Namida no Regret =

Single by Scandal

from the album Temptation Box
- Released: July 28, 2010
- Genre: J-pop
- Length: 18:20
- Label: Epic
- Songwriter(s): Hisashi Kondo, Miki Watabe

Scandal singles chronology
"Taiyō to Kimi ga Egaku Story" (2010)	"Namida no Regret" (2010)	"Scandal Nanka Buttobase" (2010)

Music video
- "Namida no Regret" on YouTube

"Namida no Regret" (涙のリグレット) is the seventh major single (tenth overall) released by Scandal. The title track is the band's first original ballad, and it was used as a Recochoku commercial song, while the first B-side, "Midnight Television", was used as the ending theme of the anime film Loups=Garous. The first press of the single came with a special booklet. The single reached #14 on the Oricon weekly chart and charted for four weeks, selling 12,176 copies.

A "separate volume "Super SCANDAL" Vol. 3" was enclosed as an initial bonus. The song was chosen as a commercial song for the music distribution site Recochoku.

== Track listing ==
CD (ESCL-3468)
No.	Title	Lyrics	Music	Length
1.	"Namida no Regret" (涙のリグレット; Tears of Regret)	Hisashi Kondo	Miki Watabe	5:13
2.	"Midnight Television"	Scandal, Aiji Hajama, Sachio Kubota	Katsu Hoshi, Sachio Kubota	4:10
3.	"Shining Sun"	Scandal, Satori Shiraishi, Isshiki Soran	Yuichi Tajika	3:46
4.	"Namida no Regret (Instrumental)" (涙のリグレット)	—	Miki Watabe	5:11
Total length:				18:20
