= Taiyō Scandalous =

"Taiyou Scandalous"

Single by Scandal
- Released: July 11, 2012
- Genre: J-pop
- Label: Epic
- Songwriters: Haruna, Naoto

Scandal singles chronology
"Harukaze" (2012)	"Taiyou Scandalous" (2012)	"Pin Heel Surfer" (2012)

Music video
- "Taiyou Scandalous" on YouTube

"Taiyou Scandalous" is the 13th major single (16th overall) released by the Japanese band Scandal. It was released in three editions: two Special Unit Editions and a Band Edition with different b-sides. The title track was produced by NAOTO (guitarist and leader of the group Orange Range), and it was used as the Itoen's "Stylee Sparkling" commercial song. The single reached #2 on the Oricon Singles Chart, and charted for six weeks selling 39,033 copies.

== Track listing ==
No.	Title	Lyrics	Music	Length
1.	"Taiyou Scandalous (太陽スキャンダラス; Scandalous Sun)"	Haruna, Naoto	Naoto	5:09
2.	"Welcome home"	Yuka Kawamura	Yuka Kawamura	4:09
3.	"Taiyou Scandalous (Instrumental) (太陽スキャンダラス)"	—	NAOTO	5:09
Total length:				14:27

Special unit edition A track list (ESCL-3924)
No.	Title	Lyrics	Music	Length
1.	"Taiyou Scandalous (太陽スキャンダラス; Scandalous Sun)"	Haruna, Naoto	Naoto	5:09
2.	"Koi no Hajimari wa Diet (恋の始まりはダイエット; Love Begins With a Diet)"	Ram Rider	Ram Rider	4:22
3.	"Taiyou Scandalous (Instrumental) (太陽スキャンダラス)"	—	Naoto	5:09
Total length:				14:40

Special unit edition B track list (ESCL-3925)
No.	Title	Lyrics	Music	Length
1.	"Taiyou Scandalous (太陽スキャンダラス)"	Haruna, Naoto	Naoto	5:09
2.	"Cherry Jam" ((artist: Dobondobondo (Mami × Tomomi)) (ちぇりーじゃむ))	Donuts Disco Deluxe	Donuts Disco Deluxe	3:52
3.	"Taiyou Scandalous (Instrumental) (太陽スキャンダラス)"	—	Naoto	5:03
Total length:				13:07
