= Sakura Goodbye =

Single by Scandal

from the album Best Scandal
- Released: March 13, 2009
- Genre: J-pop; rock
- Length: 4:00
- Label: Epic Records Japan
- Songwriter(s): Tomomi Ogawa

Scandal singles chronology
"Doll" (2008)	"Sakura Goodbye" (2009)	"Shōjo S" (2009)

Music video
- "Sakura Goodbye" on YouTube

"Sakura Goodbye" (SAKURAグッバイ) is the second major single (fifth overall) released by Japanese pop rock band Scandal. It was released in two versions: a limited CD+DVD edition and a regular CD-only edition. The title track was used as the 2009 ending theme for the television show "Mecha-Mecha Iketeru!". "Sakura Goodbye" was formerly called "Sakura" when the band performed it live during their indie days. The song has a graduation theme and the single released at the time of MAMI and TOMOMI's high school graduation. Copies of the single purchased at Tower Records came with a limited bonus sleeve from the band's endorsement for Nike Terminator. The single reached #30 on the Oricon weekly chart and charted for seven weeks, selling 6,995 copies.

== Track listing ==
=== CD ===
CD (ESCL-3175 / ESCL-3173)
No.	Title	Lyrics	Music	Length
1.	"Sakura Goodbye" (SAKURAグッバイ)	TOMOMI, MASTERWORKS	MASTERWORKS	4:00
2.	"Tokyo"	Scandal, MASTERWORKS	MASTERWORKS	2:56
3.	"Sakura Goodbye (Instrumental)" (SAKURAグッバイ)	—	MASTERWORKS	3:59
Total length:				10:55

=== DVD ===
DVD (ESCL-3174)
No.	Title	Length
1.	"Scandal Over USA -USA Live Tour- 2008 Premium Document Movie" (-USAライブツアー2008 プレミア・ドキュメント・ムービー)	20:25
