= Kagerō (Scandal song) =

Single by Scandal

from the album Yah! Yah! Yah! Hello Scandal: Maido! Scandal Desu! Yah Yah Yah!
- Released: May 5, 2008
- Genre: J-pop
- Length: 4:23
- Label: Kitty
- Songwriter(s): Tomomi Ogawa

Scandal singles chronology
"Koi Moyō" (2008)	"Kagerō" (2008)	"Doll" (2008)

"Kagerō" (カゲロウ) is the third indie single released by Japanese pop rock band Scandal. It was limited to 2,000 copies, came in a CD+DVD format only, and was exclusive to Tower Records in Japan. It was sold on Scandal's United States tour. The single reached #122 on the Oricon weekly chart and charted for one week, selling 586 copies.

== Track listing ==
=== CD ===
All lyrics are written by Tomomi Ogawa and MASTERWORKS; all music is composed by Jin Nakamura

CD (KTCD-2003)
No.	Title	Length
1.	"Kagerō" (カゲロウ; Mayfly)	4:23

=== DVD ===
DVD
No.	Title	Length
1.	"Koi Moyō anime music video" (恋模様)	3:44
