= Taiyō to Kimi ga Egaku Story =

Single by Scandal

from the album Temptation Box
- Released: June 2, 2010
- Genre: J-pop
- Length: 3:57
- Label: Epic Records Japan
- Songwriters: Tomomi Ogawa, Hidenori Tanaka

Scandal singles chronology
"Shunkan Sentimental" (2009)	"Taiyō to Kimi ga Egaku Story" (2010)	"Namida no Regret" (2010)

Music video
- "Taiyō to Kimi ga Egaku Story" on YouTube

"Taiyō to Kimi ga Egaku Story" (太陽と君が描くSTORY) is the sixth major single (ninth overall) released by Japanese pop rock band Scandal. The title track was used as the theme song for the summer events Natsu Sacas 2010 Akasaka Big Bang and Utsunomiya Hanabi Taikai 2010, while the first B-side, "Koshi-Tantan", was used as an insert song in the anime film Loups=Garous. The first press of the single came with a special booklet. The single reached #10 on the Oricon weekly chart and charted for five weeks, selling 16,027 copies.

== Track listing ==
CD (ESCL-3381)
No.	Title	Lyrics	Music	Length
1.	"Taiyō to Kimi ga Egaku Story" (太陽と君が描くSTORY; The Story Drawn by You and the Sun)	TOMOMI, Hidenori Tanaka	Hidenori Tanaka	3:57
2.	"Koshi-Tantan" (Watching Vigilantly to Hunt Prey)	Yoko Aki, Scandal	Nigiki Nishikawa	3:35
3.	"Switch" (スイッチ)	TOMOMI, Yuichi Tajika	Yuichi Tajika	4:07
4.	"Taiyō to Kimi ga Egaku Story (Instrumental)" (太陽と君が描くSTORY)	—	Yuichi Tajika	3:56
Total length:				15:38
