= Shunkan Sentimental =

Single by Scandal

from the album Temptation Box
- Released: February 3, 2010
- Genre: J-pop; hard rock
- Length: 3:45
- Label: Epic Records Japan
- Songwriter(s): Scandal, Natsumi Kobayashi, Yuichi Tajika

Scandal singles chronology
"Yumemiru Tsubasa" (2009)	"Shunkan Sentimental" (2010)	"Taiyō to Kimi ga Egaku Story" (2010)

Music video
- "Shunkan Sentimental" on YouTube

"Shunkan Sentimental" (瞬間センチメンタル) is the fifth major single (eighth overall) released by Japanese pop rock band Scandal. The title track was used as the fourth ending theme of the Fullmetal Alchemist: Brotherhood anime series. The single was released in two versions: a limited edition that was housed in a Fullmetal Alchemist: Brotherhood cardboard jacket and came with a bonus track, and a regular edition with a first press consisting of an alternate cover, a special Scandal booklet, and a Brotherhood sticker. The second B-side, "Yumemiru Koro wo Sugitemo", is a cover of Hillbilly Bops' song of the same name, which was the answered song of their previous single, "Yumemiru Tsubasa". The single reached #7 on the Oricon weekly chart and charted for thirteen weeks, selling 32,624 copies. It was certified platinum by the RIAJ for selling over 250,000 digital copies in January 2016.

== Track listing ==
Normal edition (ESCL-3381)
No.	Title	Lyrics	Music	Length
1.	"Shunkan Sentimental" (瞬間センチメンタル; Sentimental Moment)	Scandal, Natsumi Kobayashi	Yuichi Tajika	3:45
2.	"Hoshi no Furu Yoru ni" (星の降る夜に; In the Night of Falling Stars)	Scandal	Yuichi Tajika	4:03
3.	"Yumemiru Koro wo Sugitemo" (夢見る頃を過ぎても; Even If the Time to Dream Has Passed) (Hillbilly Bops cover)	Chiroru Yaho	Sachio Kubota	4:17
4.	"Shunkan Sentimental (Instrumental)" (瞬間センチメンタル)	—	Yuichi Tajika	3:46
Total length:				15:51

Limited edition (ESCL-3380)
No.	Title	Lyrics	Music	Length
1.	"Shunkan Sentimental" (瞬間センチメンタル; Sentimental Moment)	Scandal, Natsumi Kobayashi	Yuichi Tajika	3:45
2.	"Hoshi no Furu Yoru ni" (星の降る夜に; In the Night of Falling Stars)	Scandal	Yuichi Tajika	4:03
3.	"Yumemiru Koro wo Sugitemo" (夢見る頃を過ぎても; Even If the Time to Dream Has Passed) (Hillbilly Bops cover)	Chiroru Yaho	Sachio Kubota	4:17
4.	"Sunkan Sentimental (Fullmetal Alchemist: Brotherhood ED ver.)" (瞬間センチメンタル)	Scandal, Natsumi Kobayashi	Yuichi Tajika	1:31
5.	"Shunkan Sentimental (Instrumental)" (瞬間センチメンタル)	—	Yuichi Tajika	3:46
Total length:				17:22
