= Pride (Scandal song) =

Single by Scandal

from the album Baby Action
- Released: February 9, 2011
- Genre: Rock
- Length: 17:14
- Label: Epic
- Songwriters: TOMOMI, Hidenori Tanaka

Scandal singles chronology
"Scandal Nanka Buttobase" (2010)	"Pride" (2011)	"Haruka" (2011)

Music video
- "Pride" on YouTube

"Pride" is a Japanese-language song by Scandal. The song begins; "Kokoro made wa ubaenai Nandodemo nandodemo kakedaseru."

It was the ninth major-label single (12th overall) released by the band. The title track was used as the second ending theme for the anime Star Driver: Kagayaki no Takuto. The first press edition came with a Star Driver: Kagayaki no Takuto wide-cap sticker and a special booklet. The single reached #7 on the Oricon weekly chart and charted for ten weeks, selling 25,531 copies.

== Track listing ==
CD (ESCL-3468)
No.	Title	Lyrics	Music	Length
1.	"Pride"	TOMOMI, Hidenori Tanaka	Hidenori Tanaka	4:31
2.	"CUTE!"	MAMI	Hidenori Tanaka	4:31
3.	"Emotion"	RINA	RINA	3:41
4.	"Pride (Instrumental)"	—	Hidenori Tanaka	4:31
Total length:				17:14
