= 9nine =

Japanese idol group

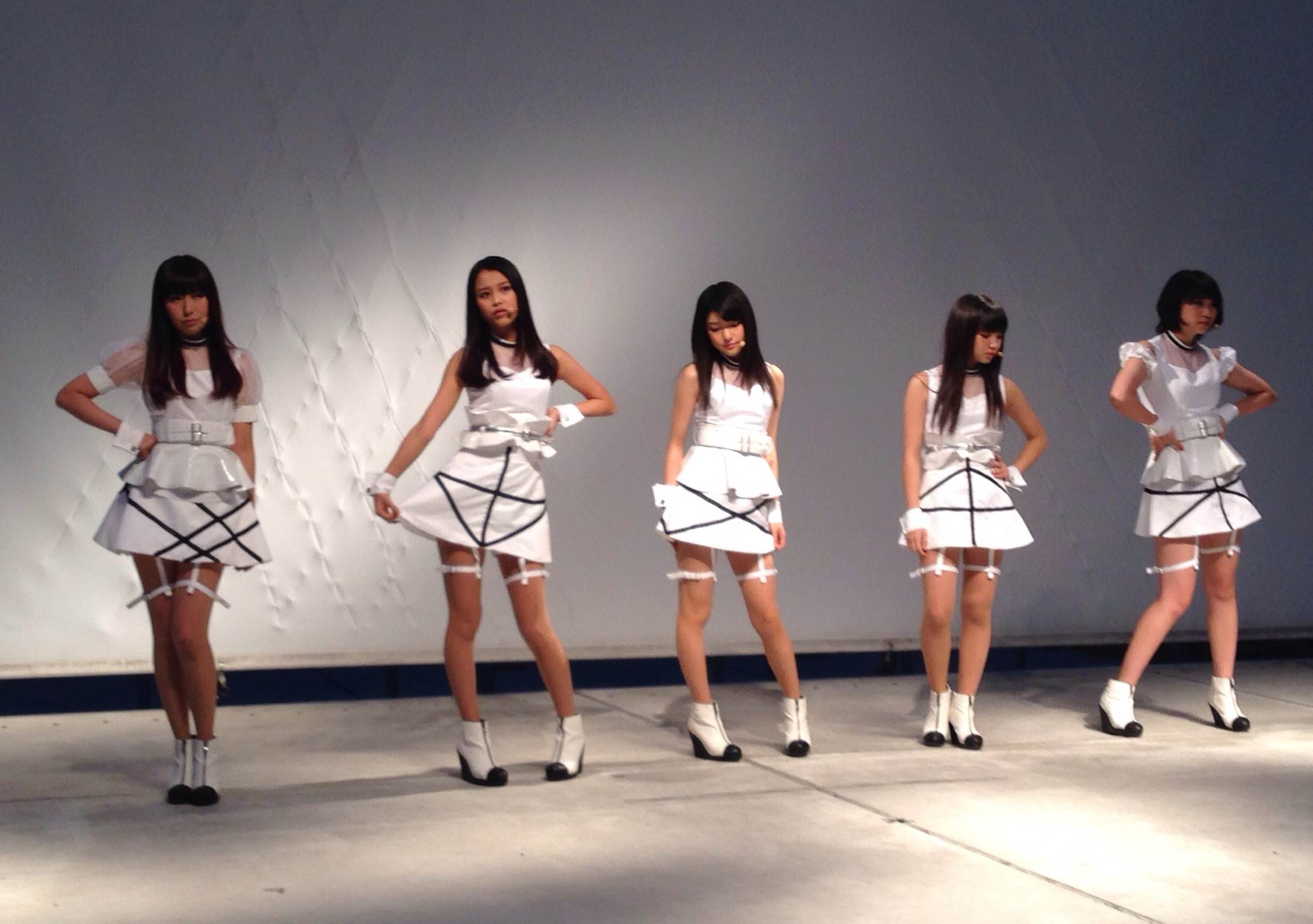
- From left, Kanae Yoshii, Hirona Murata, Uki Satake, Sayaka Nishiwaki

Background information
- Origin: Japan
- Genres: J-pop; electropop
- Years active: 2005–2019 (Note: Indefinite hiatus)
- Labels: Gate Records; Victor Entertainment; SME Records
- Members: Uki Satake; Hirona Murata
- Past members: Sayaka Nishiwaki; Kanae Yoshii; Umika Kawashima; Azusa Matsuzawa; Miwako Wagatsuma; Rubi Katō; Marie Ashida; Mai Yoshida; Midori Yamaoka; Madoka Shimogaki; Moe Miura
- Website: 9nine-fan.lespros.co.jp

9nine (pronounced simply "nine") is a Japanese idol group formed of Uki Satake, Sayaka Nishiwaki, and Hirona Murata. Formed in 2005, they are managed by LesPros Entertainment and signed to SME Records.

== History ==
=== 2005-2010: Origin and debut ===
In September 2005, 9nine was formed of Sayaka Nishiwaki, Uki Satake, Azusa Matsuzawa, Miwako Wagatsuma, Rubi Katō, Marie Ashida, Mai Yoshida, Midori Yamaoka, and Moe Miura. They released their debut single "Sweet Snow" in 2006.

=== 2010-2019: Restart and popularity ===
The band changed its music style from typical idol pop to electropop. The group's 2012 single "Shōjo Traveller" became its first to reach the top 10 on the Oricon Weekly Singles Chart. The self-titled album 9nine, that soon followed, debuted at number 8. On 27 February 2019, it was announced on their official website that the group would be pausing all activities and going on an indefinite hiatus. On 20 May 2019, Kanae Yoshii withdrew from the group and announced retirement from the entertainment industry, leaving only 3 members left in the lineup. On 21 July 2022, Sayaka Nishiwaki announced her withdrawal from the group and from LesPros Entertainment as she transferred to a new agency, but she revealed that she have intention to return to the group in the future. On 7 August 2022, Uki Satake announced that her contract with LesPros expired, but she would remain as a member of the group.

== Members ==
=== Current members ===
- Uki Satake
- Hirona Murata

=== Former members ===
- Sayaka Nishiwaki
- Kanae Yoshii
- Umika Kawashima
- Azusa Matsuzawa
- Miwako Wagatsuma
- Rubi Katō
- Marie Ashida
- Mai Yoshida
- Midori Yamaoka
- Madoka Shimogaki
- Moe Miura

== Discography ==
=== Singles ===
Year	Title	Charts	Album
Year	Title	JP	Album
Gate Records
2006	"Sweet Snow"	—	—
Victor Entertainment, Inc.
2008	"Show Time"	162	Second 9
2009	"Smile Again"	44	—
2010	"Hikari no Kage" (ヒカリノカゲ)	28	—
SME Records
2010	"Cross Over"	25	9nine
2011	"Shining Star"	13	9nine
2011	"Natsu Wanna Say Love U" (夏 wanna say love U)	15	9nine
2011	"Tick Tock 2Nite" (チクタク☆2NITE)	12	9nine
2012	"Shōjo Traveller" (少女トラベラー)	9	9nine
2012	"Ryūsei no Kuchizuke" (流星のくちづけ)	10	Cue
2012	"Yie Ar! Jiang Shi feat. Hao Hao! Jiang Shi Girl / Brave" (イーアル!キョンシー feat.好好!キョンシーガール/Brave)	11	Cue
2012	"White Wishes"	11	Cue
2013	"Colorful"	13	Cue
2013	"Evolution No. 9"	11	Magi9 Playland
2013	"Re:"	6	Magi9 Playland
2014	"With You / With Me"	4	Magi9 Playland
2015	"Happy 7 Days"	8	
2015	"My Only One"	10	
2016	"Ai Ai Ai" (愛 愛 愛)	4	
2017	"Why don't you RELAX?"	10	
2017	"SunSunSunrise/Yurutopia" (SunSunSunrise/ゆるとぴあ)	13	

=== Albums ===
Title	Album details	Charts
Title	Album details	JP
Victor Entertainment, Inc
First 9	Released: 2007; Format: CD	—
Second 9	Released: 2008	186
SME Records
9nine	Released: 2012; Format(s): CD, CD+DVD, CD+photobook	8
Cue	Released: 2013; Format(s): CD, 2CD+DVD, CD+DVD+photobook	15
Magi9 Playland	Released: 2014; Format(s): CD, CD+DVD, CD+photobook	9
Best9	Released: 2016; Format(s): CD, CD+Blu-ray, CD+DVD, CD+photobook	11

=== DVDs / Blu-ray Discs ===
Title	Details	Charts
Title	Details	JP
Victor Entertainment
It's Show Time!! Ver: Sakura '09 Part 1	Released: 2009; Format(s): DVD	—
It's Show Time!! Ver: Sakura '09 Part 2	Released: 2009; Format(s): DVD	—
SME Records
9nine of Christmas 2012 (クリスマスの9nine 2012〜聖なる夜の大奏動♪〜)	Released: 2013; Format(s): DVD, Blu-ray Disc	94
9nine Live 2013 "be!be!be! Kimi to Muko e" (9nine LIVE 2013「be!be!be!-キミトムコウヘ-」)	Released: 2014; Format(s): DVD, Blu-ray Disc	9 (DVD); 2 (BD)
9nine Wonder Live in Sunplaza	Released: 2014; Format(s): DVD, Blu-ray Disc	7 (BD)
9nine Dream Live in Budokan	Released: 2015; Format(s): DVD+photobook, BD+photobook	14 (DVD); 7 (BD)
9nine Live 2016 BEST9	Released: 2016; Format(s): DVD+photobook, BD+photobook	

=== Digital singles ===
Year	Title	Album
2006	"Shine"	—
2006	"Natsu Fuku" (夏服)	—
2007	"Shiroi Hana" (白い華)	First 9
2008	"Sky (CM Version)"	Second 9
2008	"Merry-Go-Round" (メリーゴーランド)	Second 9
2009	"Sakura Prelude" (サクラプレリュード)	"Smile Again" (Limited Edition A)
2009	"Unbalance" (アンバランス)	"Smile Again" (Limited Edition B)
2009	"Happy×2 Eyes"	"Hikari no Kage" (Limited Edition A) (Remix Ver.)
2018	"Kokudou Summer Love" (国道サマーラブ)	—
2018	"Negai no Hana" (願いの花; Wishes' Flowers)	—
