= 2012 Japanese television dramas =

←2011 - 2012 - 2013→

This is a list of Japanese television dramas shown within Japan during the year of 2012.

== Winter ==
Title (Japanese title)	Cast	Broadcast period	Episodes	Network	Notes	Ref
13-sai no Hello Work (13歳のハローワーク)	Masahiro Matsuoka, Yu Yokoyama, Mirei Kiritani	13/1/2012- 9/3/2012	9	EX		
Aibou: Season 10 (相棒 10)	Yutaka Mizutani, Mitsuhiro Oikawa	19/10/2011- 21/3/2012	19	EX		
Carnation (カーネーション)	Machiko Ono, Kaoru Kobayashi	26/9/2011 - 31/3/2012	151	NHK		
Deka Kurokawa Suzuki (デカ 黒川鈴木)	Itsuji Itao, Seiichi Tanabe, Kei Tanaka	5/1/2012- 29/3/2012	13	NTV		
Dirty Mama! (ダーティ・ママ!)	Hiromi Nagasaku, Karina	11/1/2012- 14/3/2012	10	NTV		
Hayami-san to Yobareru Hi (早海さんと呼ばれる日)	Nao Matsushita	15/1/2012- 18/3/2012	10	CX		
Honjitsu wa Taian Nari (本日は大安なり)	Kenichi Matsuyama, Hiroshi Tamaki, Naohito Fujiki	10/1/2012- 13/3/2012	10	NHK		
Hungry! (ハングリー！)	Osamu Mukai, Ryoko Kuninaka, Goro Inagaki	10/1/2012- 20/3/2012	11	CX		
Kazoku Hakkei (家族八景)	Haruka Kinami	19/1/2012- 22/3/2012 (MBS)	10	MBS, TBS	Based on a novel	
Kodoku no Gourmet (孤独のグルメ)	Yutaka Matsushige	4/1/2012- 21/3/2012	12	TX	Based on a manga	
Konna no Idol Janain!? (こんなのアイドルじゃナイン!?)	Aya Hirano	11/1/2012- 28/3/2012	12	NTV		
Lucky Seven (ラッキーセブン)	Jun Matsumoto, Eita	16/1/2012- 19/3/2012	10	CX		
Nogaremono Orin 2 (逃亡者 おりん2)	Noriko Aoyama, Dai Watanabe	17/1/2012- 27/3/2012	11	TX		
Perfect Son (理想の息子)	Yamada Ryosuke	14/1/2012- 17/3/2012	10	NTV		
Renai Neet: Wasureta Koi no Hajimekata (恋愛ニート〜忘れた恋のはじめ方)	Yukie Nakama	20/1/2012- 23/3/2012	10	TBS		
Saba Doru (さばドル)	Mayu Watanabe, Tamae Ando	13/1/2012- 5/4/2012	12	TX		
Saigo Kara Nibanme no Koi (最後から二番目の恋)	Kyōko Koizumi, Kiichi Nakai, Naoko Iijima	12/1/2012- 22/3/2012	10	CX		
Saiko no Jinsei (最高の人生の終り方〜エンディングプランナー〜)	Tomohisa Yamashita	12/1/2012- 15/3/2012	10	TBS		
Seinaru Kaibutsutachi (聖なる怪物たち)	Tomohisa Yamashita	19/1/2012- 8/3/2012	8	EX		
Shokuzai (贖罪)	Kyōko Koizumi	8/1/2012- 5/2/2012	5	WOWOW	Based on a novel	
Stepfather Step (ステップファザー・ステップ)	Takaya Kamikawa, Manami Konishi	9/1/2012- 19/3/2012	11	TBS	Based on a novel	
Strawberry Night (ストロベリーナイト)	Yūko Takeuchi, Keisuke Koide	10/1/2012- 20/3/2012	11	CX	Based on a novel	
Sūgaku Joshi Gakuen (数学女子学園)	Sayumi Michishige, Reina Tanaka, Dori Sakurada	11/1/2012- 28/3/2012	12	NTV		
Suzuko no Koi (鈴子の恋)	Kurara Emi, Yuko Asano	5/1/2012- 30/3/2012	62	CX	Based on a true story	
Switch Girl!! (スイッチガール!!)	Mariya Nishiuchi, Renn Kiriyama	24/12/2011- 18/2/2012		CX	Based on a manga	
Taira no Kiyomori (平清盛)	Kenichi Matsuyama, Hiroshi Tamaki, Naohito Fujiki		8/1/2012-	NHK	Revolving around Taira no Kiyomori, a Heian period military leader	
Teen Court: 10-dai Saiban (ティーンコート)	Ayame Goriki, Kōji Seto	10/1/2012- 20/3/2012	11	NTV		
Tightrope no Onna (タイトロープの女)	Chizuru Ikewaki	24/1/2012 28/2/2012	6	NHK		
Unmei no Hito (運命の人)	Masahiro Motoki, Takako Matsu, Yoko Maki	15/1/2012- 18/3/2012	10	TBS		

== Spring ==
Title (Japanese title)	Cast	Broadcast period	Episodes	Network	Notes	Ref
ATARU (ATARU)	Masahiro Nakai	15/4/2012- 24/6/2012	11	TBS		
Cleopatra na Onnatachi (クレオパトラな女たち)	Ryuta Sato	18/4/2012- 6/6/2012	8	NTV		
Hancho 5 (ハンチョウ〜神南署安積班〜5)	Sasaki Kuranosuke	9/4/2012-		TBS		
Hokago wa Mizuterii Totomo ni (放課後はミステリーとともに)	Haruna Kawaguchi	23/4/2012- 25/6/2012	10	TBS	Based on a novel	
Kagi no Kakatta Heya (鍵のかかった部屋)	Satoshi Ohno, Erika Toda, Kōichi Satō	16/4/2012- 25/6/2012	11	CX	Based on a novel	
Kaitakushatachi (開拓者たち)	Hikari Mitsushima, Takuya Ishida, Gō Ayano	3/4/2012- 8/5/2012	6	NHK		
Kazoku no Uta (家族のうた)	Joe Odagiri	15/4/2012- 3/6/2012	8	CX	Script changed due to plagiarism accusations	
Kodomo Keisatsu (コドモ警察)	Fuku Suzuki, Miyu Honda	17/4/2012- 19/6/2012	10	TBS		
Legal High (リーガル・ハイ)	Masato Sakai, Yui Aragaki, Katsuhisa Namase	17/4/2012- 26/6/2012	11	CX	Based on a novel	
Papadol! (パパドル!)	Ryo Nishikido	19/4/2012- 28/6/2012	10	TBS	Based on the 1987 drama Mama wa Idol!	
Shiritsu Bakaleya Koukou (私立バカレア高校)	Members of AKB48 and Johnny's Jr.	9/4/2012- 30/6/2012	12	NTV	First collaboration between AKB48 and Johnny's Jr.	
Soup Curry (スープカレー)	Yo Oizumi	13/4/2012- 18/6/2012	10	HBC, TBS	In commemoration of HBC's 60th anniversary	
Taburakashi (たぶらかし)	Mitsuki Tanimura	5/4/2012- 28/6/2012	13	NTV	Based on a novel	
Umechan Sensei (梅ちゃん先生)	Maki Horikita	2/4/2012- 29/9/2012	156	NHK		

=== Specials ===
Title (Japanese title)	Cast	Broadcast period	Episodes	Network	Notes	Ref
Akko to Bokura ga Ikita Natsu (あっこと僕らが生きた夏)	Umika Kawashima	14/4/2012- 21/4/2012	2	NHK	Based on a novel	
Hayami-san to Yobareru Hi SP (早海さんと呼ばれる日 SP)	Nao Matsushita	10/6/2012- 17/6/2012	2	CX	Continuation of Hayami-san to Yobareru Hi drama series	
SP: Keishichou Keigoka (SP 警視庁警護課II)	Tsunehiko Watase, Rino Katase, Takako Uehara	3/3/2012	1	EX		

== Summer ==
Title (Japanese title)	Cast	Broadcast period	Episodes	Network	Notes	Ref
Beautiful Rain (ビューティフルレイン)	Etsushi Toyokawa, Mana Ashida	2/7/2012-		CX		
Beginners! (ビギナーズ！)	Taisuke Fujigaya	12/7/2012-		TBS		
Boku no Natsu Yasumi (ぼくの夏休み)	Shuto Ayabe, Akari Ninomiya	2/6/2012-		THK, CX		
Dragon Seinendan (ドラゴン青年団)	Shouta Yasuda	17/7/2012- (TBS)		MBS, TBS		
Ghost Mama Sousasen (ゴーストママ捜査線)	Yukie Nakama	7/7/2012-		NTV	Based on a manga	
Great Teacher Onizuka (GTO)	Akira, Miori Takimoto	3/7/2012-		CX	Based on a manga	
Iki mo Dekinai Natsu (息もできない夏)	Emi Takei, Yōsuke Eguchi	20/7/2012-		CX		
Iryu Sosa 2 (遺留捜査)	Nanao Arai, Yuichi Nakamaru, Mayu Kusakari	12/7/2012-		EX		
Keigo Higashino Mysteries (東野圭吾ミステリーズ)	Kiichi Nakai	5/7/2012-	11	CX	Based on 11 different short stories by Keigo Higashino	
Kuro no Onna Kyoshi (黒の女教師)	Nana Eikura	20/7/2012-		TBS		
Magma (マグマ)	Machiko Ono, Shosuke Tanihara, Kyōzō Nagatsuka	10/6/2012- 8/7/2012	5	WOWOW	Based on a novel	
Majisuka Gakuen 3 (マジすか学園3)	Haruka Shimazaki, Members of AKB48	13/7/2012-		TX		
Naniwa Shonen Tanteidan (浪花少年探偵団)	Mikako Tabe, Teppei Koike	2/7/2012-		TBS	Based on a novel	
Nemureru Mori no Jyukujyo (眠れる森の熟女)	Tamiyo Kusakari	2012 4/9/2012- 30/10/2012	9	NHK		
Omoni Naitemasu (主に泣いてます)	Nanao, Yuichi Nakamaru	7/7/2012-		CX	Based on a manga	
Platinum Town (プラチナタウン)	Yo Oizumi, Rei Dan, Hiroyuki Hirayama	19/8/2012-		WOWOW	Based on a novel	
Rich Man, Poor Woman (リッチマン、プアウーマン)	Shun Oguri, Satomi Ishihara	9/7/2012-		CX		
Somato Kabushiki Gaisha (走馬灯株式会社)	Yu Kashii	16/7/2012		TBS	Based on a manga	
Sprout (スプラウト)	Yuri Chinen, Aoi Morikawa, Fujiko Kojima	7/7/2012-		NTV	Based on a manga	
Summer Rescue (サマーレスキュー 〜天空の診療所〜)	Osamu Mukai	8/7/2012-		TBS		
Totkan Tokubetsu Kokuzei Choshukan (トッカン 特別国税徴収官)	Mao Inoue	4/7/2012-		NTV	Based on a novel	
Urero: Mikan Seishojo (ウレロ☆未完成少女)	Hitori Gekidan	13/7/2012-		TX		
Vision: Koroshi Ga Mieru Onna (VISION 殺しが見える女)	Nobuaki Kaneko, Yu Yamada			NTV		

== Autumn ==
Title (Japanese title)	Cast	Broadcast period	Episodes	Network	Avg. Ratings	Notes	Ref
Aibou 11 (相棒11)	Yutaka Mizutani, Hiroki Narimiya	10/10/2012- March 2013		EX			
Akumu-chan (悪夢ちゃん)	Manatsu Kimura, Keiko Kitagawa	13/10/2012- 22/12/2012	11	NTV	11.5%	Based on a novel	
Doctor X: Gekai Daimon Michiko (ドクターX ～外科医・大門未知子～)	Ryoko Yonekura	18/10/2012- 13/12/2012	8	EX	19.1%		
Double Face (ダブルフェイス)	Hidetoshi Nishijima, Teruyuki Kagawa			TBS, WOWOW	-	Two different perspectives of the story will be shown on each television network	
Going My Home (ゴーイング マイ ホーム)	Hiroshi Abe, Tomoko Yamaguchi	9/10/2012- 18/12/2012	10	CX	7.9%	Directed by Hirokazu Koreeda	
Hana no Zubora Meshi (花のズボラ飯)	Kana Kurashina, Shigeaki Kato	23/10/2012- 25/12/2012 (TBS)	10	MBS, TBS	-	Based on a manga	
Kekkon Shinai (結婚しない)	Miho Kanno, Yūki Amami, Hiroshi Tamaki	11/10/2012- 20/12/2012	11	CX	11.8%		
Koisuru Hae Onna (恋するハエ女)	Mimura, Toshio Kakei	6/11/2012- 18/12/2012	6	NHK	-		
Koko Nyushi (高校入試)	Masami Nagasawa	6/10/2012- 29/12/2012	13	CX	6.9%	Screenplay by novelist Kanae Minato	
Monsters (MONSTERS)	Shingo Katori, Tomohisa Yamashita	21/10/2012- 9/12/2012	8	TBS	11.9%		
Nemureru Mori no Jukujo (眠れる森の熟女)	Tamiyo Kusakari, Koji Seto	4/9/2012- 30/10/2012	9	NHK	-		
Osozaki no Himawari (遅咲きのヒマワリ～ボクの人生、リニューアル～)	Toma Ikuta, Yoko Maki	23/10/2012- 25/12/2012	10	TBS	9.2%		
Perfect Blue (パーフェクトブルー)	Miyuki Miyabe	8/10/2012- 17/12/2012	11	TBS	8.1%	Based on a novel	
Priceless (Priceless)	Takuya Kimura, Kiichi Nakai, Karina	22/10/2012- 24/12/2012	10	CX	17.7%		
Resident - 5-nin no Kenshui (レジデント〜5人の研修医)	Riisa Naka, Kento Hayashi, Takahisa Masuda	18/10/2012- 20/12/2012	10	TBS	6.7%		
Single Mothers (シングルマザーズ)	Yasuko Sawaguchi, Tetsushi Tanaka, Shiori Kutsuna	23/10/2012- 11/12/2012	8	NHK	-	Based on a stage play	
Sousa Chizu no Onna (捜査地図の女)	Miki Maya	18/10/2012- 6/12/2012	7	EX	10.1%		
Sugarless (シュガーレス)	Aran Shirahama, Reo Sano	3/10/2012- 26/12/2012	12	NTV	-	Based on a manga	
Tokumei Tantei (匿名探偵)	Katsunori Takahashi	12/10/2012- 7/12/2012	9	EX	10.5%		
Tokyo Airport: Tokyo Kukou Kansei Hoanbu (TOKYOエアポート～東京空港管制保安部～)	Kyoko Fukada	14/10/2012- 23/12/12	10	CX	10.2%		
Tokyo Zenryoku Shoujo (東京全力少女)	Emi Takei, Atsuro Watabe	10/10/2012- 19/12/2012	11	NTV	7.6%		
