= 2013 Japanese television dramas =

←2012 - 2013 - 2014→

This is a list of Japanese television dramas shown within Japan during the year of 2013.

== Winter ==
Title (Japanese title)	Cast	Broadcast period	Episodes	Network	Notes	Ref
Apoyan (あぽやん)	Atsushi Itō, Mirei Kiritani, Shihori Kanjiya	17/1/2013-21/3/2013	10	TBS	Based on a novel	
The Case Files of Biblia Bookstore (ビブリア古書堂の事件手帖)	Ayame Goriki	14/1/2013-25/3/2013	11	CX	Based on a novel	
dinner (dinner)	Yōsuke Eguchi, Kana Kurashina	13/1/2013-24/3/2013	11	CX		
Karamazov no Kyodai (カラマーゾフの兄弟)	Hayato Ichihara, Takumi Saito, Kento Hayashi	12/1/2013-23/3/2013	11	CX	Based on the novel The Brothers Karamazov	
Last Hope (ラストホープ)	Masaki Aiba, Mikako Tabe	15/1/2013-26/3/2013	11	CX		
Nakuna, Hara-chan (泣くな、はらちゃん)	Tomoya Nagase	19/1/2013-23/3/2013	10	NHK		
A Chef of Nobunaga (信長のシェフ)	Yuta Tamamori, Mitsuhiro Oikawa, Mirai Shida	11/1/2013-15/3/2013	9	EX	Based on a manga	
Otome-san (おトメさん)	Hitomi Kuroki, Saki Aibu	17/1/2013-14/3/2013	9	EX		
Saikou no Rikon (最高の離婚)	Eita, Machiko Ono, Yoko Maki, Gō Ayano	10/1/2013-21/3/2013	11	CX		
Saki (サキ)	Yukie Nakama, Shohei Miura	8/1/2013-19/3/2013	11	CX		
Share House no Koibito (シェアハウスの恋人)	Asami Mizukawa, Yuto Nakajima	16/1/2013-13/3/2013	9	NTV		
Tonbi (とんび)	Masaaki Uchino, Takako Tokiwa	13/1/2013-17/3/2013	10	TBS	Based on a novel	
Yakou Kanransha (夜行観覧車)	Kyōka Suzuki, Yuriko Ishida	18/1/2013-22/3/2013	10	TBS	Based on a novel	

== Spring ==
Title (Japanese title)	Cast	Broadcast period	Episodes	Network	Notes	Ref
Last Cinderella (ラスト シンデレラ)	Ryoko Shinohara, Haruma Miura, Naohito Fujiki, Nene Otsuka, Naoko Iijima	11/4/2013-20/6/2013	11	CX		
Vampire Heaven (ヴァンパイア・ヘヴン)	Aya Ōmasa, Tsubasa Honda, Yūta Hiraoka	12/4/2013-5/7/2013	12	TX		
35-sai no Koukousei (35歳の高校生)		13/4/2013-22/6/2013	11	NTV		
Sennyu Tantei Tokage (潜入探偵トカゲ)		18/4/2013-20/6/2013	10	TBS		
Keiji 110kilo (刑事110キロ)		25/4/2013-13/6/2013	8	EX		

== Summer ==
Title (Japanese title)	Cast	Broadcast period	Episodes	Network	Notes	Ref
Summer Nude (SUMMER NUDE)	Tomohisa Yamashita, Erika Toda, Karina Nose	8/7/2013-9/2013		CX		
Oh, My Dad!! (Oh, My Dad!!)		11/7/2013-		CX		
Pin to Kona (ぴんとこな)		18/7/2013-		TBS		
Hanzawa Naoki (半沢直樹)	Sakai Masato, Aya Ueto	7/7/2013-22/9/2013		TBS		

== Autumn ==
Title (Japanese title)	Cast	Broadcast period	Episodes	Network	Notes	Ref
Hakuba no Ōji-sama Junai Tekireiki (ハクバノ王子サマ 純愛適齢期)	Takahiro Miura, Shunsuke Nakamura, Hirofumi Arai	3/10/2013-		NTV, Yomiuri TV	Based on a manga	
