= 2015 Japanese television dramas =

←2014 - 2015 - 2016→

This is a list of Japanese television dramas shown within Japan during the year of 2015.

== Winter ==
Series

Title (Japanese title)	Network	Broadcast period	Cast	Genre	Theme song	Episodes	Average ratings (%)	Notes	Ref
Massan (マッサン)	NHK	September 29, 2014 to March 28, 2015	Tetsuji Tamayama, Charlotte Kate Fox, Saki Aibu, Gin Maeda, Shinichi Tsutsumi, Kiyoshi Nishikawa	Drama	Miyuki Nakajima "Mugi no Uta"	150	21.1	Based on the lives of Masataka Taketsuru and his wife Jessie Roberta Cowan.	
Aibō season 13 (相棒 season13)	EX	October 15, 2014 to March 18, 2015	Yutaka Mizutani, Hiroki Narimiya	Detective		19	17.4		
Hana Moyu (花燃ゆ)	NHK	January 4, 2015 to December 13, 2015	Mao Inoue, Takao Osawa, Yūsuke Iseya, Kengo Kora, Masahiro Higashide, Koji Seto, Kin'ya Kitaōji	Jidaigeki	NHK Symphony Orchestra	50	12.0		
Zeni no Sensou (銭の戦争)	CX; KTV	January 6, 2015 to March 17, 2015	Tsuyoshi Kusanagi, Yuko Oshima, Fumino Kimura, Atsuro Watabe	Drama; Suspense	SMAP "Karei Naru Gyakushū"	11	13.3	Based on the Korean drama series War of Money.	
Zenryoku Rikon Sodan (全力離婚相談)	NHK	January 6, 2015 to February 17, 2015	Maya Miki, Yusuke Kamiji, Hiroshi Tachi	Human	Yuko Ando "Ningyo Hime"	7	5.0		
Toho Nanahun (徒歩7分)	NHK BS; Premium	January 6, 2015 to February 17, 2015	Rena Tanaka, Kei Tanaka, Seiji Fukushi, Mako Ishino		Kyōko Endō "Mōichido Aitai"	8			
Doctors: Saikyou no Meii (DOCTORS〜最強の名医〜)	EX	January 8, 2015 to March 5, 2015	Ikki Sawamura, Masanobu Takashima, Manami Higa, Tomoka Kurokawa	Medical; Drama	Kobukuro "Kiseki"	9	14.4		
Utsukushiki Wana (美しき罠〜残花繚乱〜)	TBS	January 8, 2015 to March 10, 2015	Rena Tanaka, Mayumi Wakamura, Sho Aoyagi, Rieko Miura	Drama; Suspense	Rei Yasuda "Koiuta"	10	6.6	Based on the Japanese novel Zanka Ryōran.	
Kaiki Renai Sakusen (怪奇恋愛作戦)	TX	January 10, 2015 to March 28, 2015	Kumiko Asō, Maki Sakai, Ogawa Tamaki, Tōru Nakamura	Comedy	Joōbachi "Venus"; Denki Groove "Fallin' Down"	12			
Gakkō no Kaidan (学校のカイダン)	NTV	January 10, 2015 to March 14, 2015	Suzu Hirose, Ryūnosuke Kamiki, Shigeru Izumiya, Atsuko Asano, Katsuhisa Namase, Maho Nonami	School	B'z "Uchōten"	10	9.2		
Keibuho Sugiyama Shintaro (警部補・杉山真太郎)	TBS	January 12, 2015 to March 23, 2015	Shōsuke Tanihara, Jun Kaname, Takaaki Enoki, Nana Katase	Police	Generations from Exile Tribe "Sing It Loud"	11	7.1		
Taikomochi no Tatsujin (太鼓持ちの達人)	TX	January 12, 2015 to March 30, 2015	Toru Tezuka, Tokio Emoto, Haruka Kinami, Fuku Suzuki	Comedy	Glim Spanky "Homeroyo"	12			
Ghost Writer (ゴーストライター)	CX	January 13, 2015 to March 17, 2015	Miki Nakatani, Asami Mizukawa, Shohei Miura, Nanao	Drama	Daichi Miura "Unlock"; Androp "Ghost"	10	8.6		
Masshiro (まっしろ)	TBS	January 13, 2015 to March 17, 2015	Maki Horikita, Yūya Yagira, Mirai Shida, Rin Takanashi	Drama; Medical	miwa "Fighting Girls"	10	5.8		
Marumaru Tsuma (○○妻)	NTV	January 14, 2015 to March 18, 2015	Ko Shibasaki, Noriyuki Higashiyama, Hitomi Kuroki	Drama	Ringo Sheena "Shijō no Jinsei"	10	14.3		
Zannen na Otto (残念な夫。)	CX	January 14, 2015 to March 25, 2015	Hiroshi Tamaki, Kana Kurashina	Comedy; Drama	Unicorn "Hai YES!"	10	7.6		
Mondai no Aru Restaurant (問題のあるレストラン)	CX	January 15, 2015 to March 19, 2015	Yōko Maki (actress), Masahiro Higashide, Fumi Nikaidō, Mitsuki Takahata, Mayu Matsuoka, You	Comedy	Kyary Pamyu Pamyu "Mondai Girl"	10	9.3		
Dekin no Onna (出入禁止の女)	EX	January 15, 2015 to February 26, 2015	Alisa Mizuki, Naomi Zaizen, Nenji Kobayashi	Drama	lecca "live again"	6	6.5		
Date (デート)	CX	January 19, 2015 to March 23, 2015	Anne Watanabe, Hiroki Hasegawa, Ryoko Kuninaka, Yuto Nakajima, Emi Wakui	Romance; Comedy	The Peanuts "Furimukanaide" chay "Anata ni Koi o Shite Mimashita"	10	12.5		
Majisuka Gakuen 4 (マジすか学園4)	NTV	January 20, 2015 to March 31, 2015	Sakura Miyawaki, Haruka Shimazaki	Teen	AKB48 "Majisuka Fight" "Yankee Rock"	10			
Take me to Love & Meal (女くどき飯)	MBS; TBS	January 26, 2015 to March 16, 2015; January 28, 2015 to March 18, 2015	Shihori Kanjiya		Alexandros "Dracula La"	8		Based on the Japanese manga series Onna Kudokimeshi.	
Second Love (セカンド・ラブ)	EX	February 6, 2015 to February 20, 2015	Kazuya Kamenashi, Kyoko Fukada	Romance	KAT-TUN "Kiss Kiss Kiss"	7	7.1		

== See also ==
- List of Japanese television dramas
- 2015 in Japanese television
