= Priceless (TV series) =

- Poster
- Genre: Drama
- Directed by: Suzuki Masayuki, Hirano Shin
- Starring: Takuya Kimura
- Theme music composer: Sato Naoki
- Ending theme: Jumpin' Jack Flash (The Rolling Stones)
- Country of origin: Japan
- Original language: Japanese
- No. of seasons: 1

Production
- Producers: Makino Tadashi, Murase Ken
- Camera setup: Multi-camera
- Running time: 54 minutes
- Production company: Fuji TV

Original release
- Network: Fuji TV
- Release: October 22 – December 24, 2012

Priceless: Aru Wake Nedaro, Nnamon! (PRICELE$S〜あるわけねぇだろ、んなもん!〜; lit. PRICELE$S: There's no such thing!) is a Japanese television series which premiered on Fuji TV on October 22, 2012. This television series stars Takuya Kimura as Fumio Kindaichi, a salaryman who gets fired from his company after he was accused of being involved in commercial espionage. Coupled with a series of unfortunate accidents, Fumio suddenly loses everything he has and becomes poor.

== Plot ==
Fumio Kindaichi is a middle management salaryman on good terms with his co-workers. One day, he is suddenly accused of stealing commercial secrets, and is fired by his company. He's even ostracized by his co-workers. Before the end of the day, he has essentially become a homeless and penniless man. Without any idea of how to survive on the streets, he has to settle in for a rough night.

Fumio later learns how to earn some money on the street from two children, brothers, he meets. They lead him to a boarding house that allows him to stay for 500 yen per night. In the struggle to earn this sum of money, Fumio begins to appreciate the worth of money. He also learns that not all precious things in life can be bought with money.

Despite his predicament, Fumio remains an optimistic person, and does not feel bitter over his sudden dismissal. Instead, he helps the people around him with much enthusiasm, without asking for anything in return.

== Cast ==
- Takuya Kimura as Fumio Kindaichi
- Kiichi Nakai as Kengo Moai
- Karina Nose as Saya Nikaido
- Taisuke Fujigaya as Kotaro Enomoto
- Misako Renbutsu as Yoko Hirose
- Takeshi Masu as Takeshi Fujisawa
- Oshiro Maeda as Kanta Marioka
- Kanau Tanaka as Ryota Marioka
- Atsuo Nakamura as Iwao Oyashiki
- Issey Ogata as Osamu Zaizen
- Mari Natsuki as Ichirin Marioka
- Naohito Fujiki as Toichiro Oyashiki
- Haruna Kojima as Moe Tomizawa (Ep.3-5, 7-10)

== Episodes ==
| | Episode title | Romanized title | Translation of title | Broadcast date | Ratings |
|---|---|---|---|---|---|
| Ep. 1 | はじめての貧乏…五百円稼ぐって難しい | Hajimete no binbō… go hyaku-en kasegu tte muzukashī | First time being poor... It is difficult to earn 500 yen | October 22, 2012 | 16.9% |
| Ep. 2 | 貧乏って弱いの? | Binbō tte yowai no? | Being poor is a weakness? | October 29, 2012 | 18.8% |
| Ep. 3 | 1万円のラーメン | 1 Man-en no rāmen | The 10,000 yen ramen | November 5, 2012 | 15.2% |
| Ep. 4 | 最後の一人も堕ちてきた | Saigo no hitori mo ochite kita | The last remaining person has also fallen | November 12, 2012 | 18.4% |
| Ep. 5 | 奇跡の始まり | Kiseki no hajimari | The beginning of a miracle | November 19, 2012 | 15.7% |
| Ep. 6 | 日本一の貧乏社長、誕生! | Nihon'ichi no binbō shachō, tanjō! | Japan's first poor company president appears! | November 26, 2012 | 18.1% |
| Ep. 7 | 大逆転 | Dai gyakuten | A large reversal | December 3, 2012 | 17.2% |
| Ep. 8 | さよなら…そして、ありがとう | Sayonara… soshite, arigatō | Goodbye...and thank you | December 10, 2012 | 20.1% |
| Ep. 9 | 最後の戦い〜それぞれの思い | Saigonotatakai 〜 Sorezore No Omoi | The Final Battle: The difference between each person's belief | December 17, 2012 | 17.4% |
| Ep. 10 | 一部生放送スペシャル 聖なる夜に起こす最後の奇跡 | Ichibu namahōsō supesharu seinaru yoru ni okosu saigo no kiseki | Special live broadcast: The last miracle of the holy night. | December 24, 2012 | 18.7% |
Ratings for Kanto region (average rating: 17.71%)

== Reception ==
The first episode of Priceless had the third-highest viewership rating of all Autumn 2012 Japanese television drama debut episodes with a rating of 16.9% in the Kanto region, behind Aibou 11 (with a rating of 19.9%) and Doctor-X: Surgeon Michiko Daimon (with a rating of 18.6%). This marks the first time that a drama starring actor Takuya Kimura had debuted with a rating of less than 20%. This low viewership rating was attributed to the fact that the drama had to compete with a popular baseball match airing concurrently on another television network, which garnered a rating of 20.1% itself.

== International broadcast ==
It aired in Thailand on Channel 7 beginning April 24, 2015, dubbed as Yodchai Naiyajok . ("ยอดชาย นายยาจก", literally: Super Beggar). In Sri Lanka, it began airing in October 2016 on WakuWaku Japan with English subtitles under the title, Priceless: Is There Such a Thing.

| Preceded by Rich Man, Poor Woman (9/7/2012 - 17/9/2012) | Fuji TV Getsu 9 Drama Series 月曜9時枠の連続ドラマ; Mondays 21:00 - 21:54 (JST) | Succeeded by The Case Files of Biblia Bookstore (January 2013 - March 2013) |
