= 2011 Japanese television dramas =

←2010 - 2011 - 2012→

This is a list of Japanese television dramas often called doramas by fans.

== Networks ==
- NHK
- NTV (Nihon TV)
  - YTV (Yomiuri TV)
- TBS
  - MBS
- CX (Fuji TV)
  - KTV (Kansai TV)
  - THK (Tokai TV)
- EX (TV Asahi)
  - ABC
- TX (TV Tokyo)
- WOWOW

== Winter (January to March) ==
Broadcasting Period	Day of Week	Air Time (JST)	English Title Japanese Title	Ep.	Network	Lead Actor/Actress	Web Page	Theme Song	AVG Rating
2010 | Mar. 21	Mon.	20:00 | 20:54	Mito Kōmon (XLII) 水戸黄門 第42部		TBS	Kōtarō Satomi	web
Jan. 17 | Mar.	Mon.	21:00 | 21:54	Taisetsu na Koto wa Subete Kimi ga Oshiete Kureta 大切なことはすべて君が教えてくれた		CX	Erika Toda, Haruma Miura	web	Porno Graffitti "EXIT"
Jan. 10 | Mar.	Mon.	22:00 | 22:54	Saijō no Meii 最上の命医	10	TX	Takumi Saito	web
Jan. 11 | Mar.	Tue.	21:00 | 21:54	CONTROL; CONTROL〜犯罪心理捜査〜		CX	Nao Matsushita, Naohito Fujiki	web
Jan. 4 | Feb. 8	Tue.	22:00 | 22:43	Fake Kyoto Bijutsu Jiken Emaki フェイク 京都美術事件絵巻	6	NHK	Naomi Zaizen	web
Feb. 15 | Mar. 8	Tue.	22:00 | 22:43	Shijūkunichi no Recipe 四十九日のレシピ	4	NHK	Emi Wakui	web
Jan. 11 | Mar.	Tue.	22:00 | 22:54	Utsukushii Rinjin 美しい隣人		KTV	Yukie Nakama	web
Jan. 18 | Mar.	Tue.	24:55 | 25:25	Quartet カルテット	9	MBS	Saki Fukuda	web
2010 | Mar.	Wed.	21:00 | 21:54	Aibō (IX) 相棒Season 9		EX	Yutaka Mizutani	web
Jan. 12 | Mar.	Wed.	22:00 | 22:54	Misaki NO.1!! 美咲ナンバーワン!!		NTV	Karina Nose	web
Jan. 20 | Mar.	Thu.	20:00 | 20:54	Honboshi ホンボシ～心理特捜事件簿～		EX	Eiichiro Funakoshi	web
Jan. 20 | Mar.	Thu.	21:00 | 21:54	Kokuhatsu 告発〜国選弁護人		EX	Masakazu Tamura	web
2010 | 春	Thu.	21:00 | 21:54	Wataru Seken wa oni Bakari (X) 渡る世間は鬼ばかり		TBS	Izumi Pinko	web
Jan. 13 | Mar.	Thu.	22:00 | 22:54	Gaikoukan Kuroda Kōsaku 外交官・黒田康作		CX	Yūji Oda	web
2010 | Mar.	Thu.	22:55 | 23:25	Shukujo 祝女～SHUKUJO～		NHK	Miwako Ichikawa	web
Jan. 6 | Mar.	Thu.	23:58 | 24:38	Jidankōshōnin Gota Keshi 示談交渉人 ゴタ消し		YTV	Akihiro Nishino	web
Jan. 21 | Mar.	Fri.	21:00 | 21:54	Akutō 悪党〜重犯罪捜査班		EX; ABC	Katsunori Takahashi	web
Jan. 7 | Mar.	Fri.	22:00 | 22:54	LADY; LADY〜最後の犯罪プロファイル〜		TBS	Keiko Kitagawa	web	Kou Shibasaki "Mukei Spirit"
Feb. 4 | Mar.	Fri.	23:15 | 24:10	Bartender バーテンダー		EX	Masaki Aiba	web
Jan. 14 | Mar.	Fri.	24:12 | 24:53	URAKARA; URAKARA		TX	Kara	web
Jan. 14 | Mar.	Fri.	24:20 | 24:50	Heaven's Flower ヘブンズ・フラワー〜Heaven's Flower〜		TBS	Umika Kawashima	web
Jan. 8 | Mar.	Sat.	19:30 | 20:00	Onmitsu Happyaku Yachō 隠密八百八町	9	NHK	Hiroshi Tachi	web
Feb. 26 | Mar. 26	Sat.	21:00 | 21:50	Taro no Tō; TAROの塔	4	NHK	Suzuki Matsuo	web
Mar. 26 |	Sat.	21:00 | 21:50	Challenged チャレンジド〜卒業〜		NHK	Kuranosuke Sasaki
Jan. 15 | Mar.	Sat.	21:00 | 21:54	Deka Wanko デカワンコ		NTV	Mikako Tabe	web
Jan. 8 | Feb. 26	Sat.	00:00 | 00:54	Shakking (II) 借王＜シャッキング＞II－運命の報酬－	8	WOWOW	Shunsuke Nakamura	web
Jan. 9 | 春	Sun.	20:00 | 20:45	Gō 江〜姫たちの戦国〜		NHK	Juri Ueno	web
Jan. 16 | Mar.	Sun.	21:00 | 21:54	SCHOOL!! スクール!!		CX	Yōsuke Eguchi	web
Jan. 16 | Mar.	Sun.	21:00 | 21:54	Fuyu no Sakura 冬のサクラ		TBS	Tsuyoshi Kusanagi	web
Mar. 27 |	Sun.	22:00 | 22:54	CO Ishoku Coordinator; CO 移植コーディネーター		WOWOW	Hidetaka Yoshioka	web
2010 | Mar.	Sun.	23:00 | 23:45	Sōkyū no Subaru 蒼穹の昴		NHK	Yūko Tanaka	web
Jan. 30 | Mar.	Sun.	23:00 | 23:55	Dr. Irabu Ichirō; Dr.伊良部一郎		EX	Satoshi Tokushige	web

=== Specials ===
Broadcasting Period	Day of Week	Air Time (JST)	English Title Japanese Title	Ep.	Network	Lead Actor/Actress	Web Page	Theme Song	AVG Rating
Jan. 5	Wed.		Toilet no Kamisama トイレの神様	1	MBS		web
Mar. 30	Wed.		Sayonara Bokutachi no Youchien さよならぼくたちのようちえん	1	NTV	Mana Ashida	web	Sayonara Bokutachi no Youchien

== Spring (April to June) ==
Broadcasting Period	Day of Week	Air Time (JST)	English Title Japanese Title	Ep.	Network	Lead Actor/Actress	Web Page	Theme Song	AVG Rating
Apr. | Jun.	Mon.	22:00 | 22:54	Suzuki Sensei 鈴木先生		TX	Hiroki Hasegawa	web
Apr. 14 | May	Tue.	22:00 | 22:43	Madonna Verde マドンナ・ヴェルデ	6	NHK	Keiko Matsuzaka
Apr. | Jun.	Tue.	22:00 | 22:54	Good Life グッドライフ～ありがとう、パパ。さよなら～		KTV	Takashi Sorimachi
Apr. | Jun.	Tue.	22:00 | 22:43	BOSS (II); BOSS 2		CX	Yūki Amami
Apr. | Jun.	Thu.	21:00 | 21:54	Hagane no Onna (II) ハガネの女season 2		EX	Michiko Kichise
冬 | 夏	Thu.	21:00 | 21:54	Wataru Seken wa oni Bakari (X) 渡る世間は鬼ばかり		TBS	Izumi Pinko	web
Apr. 15 | Jul. 1	Fri.	24:12 | 24:53	Majisuka Gakuen (II) マジすか学園2	12	TX	Atsuko Maeda	web	AKB48 "Yankee Soul"
冬 | 夏	Sun.	20:00 | 20:45	Gō 江〜姫たちの戦国〜		NHK	Juri Ueno	web
Apr. 17 | Jun.26	Sun.	21:00 | 21:54	JIN (II); JIN-仁- (完結編)	11	TBS	Takao Osawa	web	Ken Hirai "Itoshiki Hibi yo"	20.6%
Apr. | Jun.	Sun.	23:00 | 23:55	Asukō March アスコーマーチ!		EX	Emi Takei	web
Apr.4 | Oct. 1	Mon | Sat	08:00	Ohisama おひさま		NHK	Mao Inoue, Kengo Kora	web
Apr. 24 | Jul. 3	Sun |	21:00 | 21:54	Marumo no Okite マルモのおきて	11	Fuji TV	Mana Ashida, Abe Sadao	web	Kaoru to Yuki, Tama ni Mook "Maru Maru Mori Mori!"	15.48%
April 15 | Jun. 10	Fri	23:15 | 24:10	Inu o Kau to Iu Koto 犬を飼うということ	9	EX	Nishikido Ryo, Mizukawa Asami	web	Kanjani Eight "My Home"	8.47%

=== Specials ===
Broadcasting Period	Day of Week	Air Time (JST)	English Title Japanese Title	Ep.	Network	Lead Actor/Actress	Web Page	Theme Song	AVG Rating
Mar 27 | Apr 17	Mon.	23:00 | 23:54	Yokoyama Hideo Suspense 横山秀夫サスペンス	4	WOWOW		web

== Summer (July to September) ==
Broadcasting Period	Day of Week	Air Time (JST)	English Title Japanese Title	Ep.	Network	Lead Actor/Actress	Web Page	Theme Song	AVG Rating
春 | Sep.	Thu.	21:00 | 21:54	Wataru Seken wa oni Bakari (X) 渡る世間は鬼ばかり		TBS	Izumi Pinko	web
夏 | 秋	Sun.	20:00 | 20:45	Gō 江〜姫たちの戦国〜		NHK	Juri Ueno	web
夏 | 秋	Sun.	21:00 | 21:54	Hanazakari no Kimitachi e 花ざかりの君たちへ〜イケメン☆パラダイス〜		CX	Maeda Atsuko	web
夏 | 秋	Sun.	22:00 | 22:54	Ikemen desu ne 美男ですね		TBS		web
Jul 5 | Sep	Mon | Fri	13:30 | 14:00	Ashita no Hikari wo Tsukame 2 明日の光をつかめ2		CX	Fujiko Kojima, Yuya Matsushita	web
Jul | Sep	Thu	22:00 | 22:54	Soredemo, Ikite Yuku それでも、生きてゆく		CX	Eita, Hikari Mitsushima		Tokyo no Sora by Kazumasa Oda
Jul | Sep	Tue	21:00 | 21:54	Zettai Reido 2 絶対零度2		CX	Aya Ueto
May 31 | Sep	Tue	22:00 | 22:54	Karyu no Utage 下流の宴	8	NHK	Hitomi Kuroki, Yōko Nogiwa, Natsuki Kato
May 31 | Sep	Tue	22:00 | 22:54	Team Batista 3 チームバチスタ3	web	CX	Atsushi Itō, Toru Nakamura
Jul | Sep	Tue	24:55 |	Arakawa Under the Bridge 荒川アンダーザ ブリッジ		TBS	Kento Hayashi, Mirei Kiritani
Jul | Sep	Fri	24:20 | 24:50	Ouran High School Host Club 桜蘭高校ホスト部		TBS	Haruna Kawaguchi, Yusuke Yamamoto	web
Jul | Sep	Wed	21:00 | 21:54	Keishicho Sosa Ikka 9 Gakari 6 警視庁捜査一課９係		EX	Yutaka Mizutani, Oikawa Mitsuhiro
Jul | Sep	Thu	20:00 | 20:54	Kyoto Chiken no Onna 7 京都地検の女 7		EX	Tsunehiko Watase, Atsuko Sakurai, Natsumi Nanase
Jul | Sep	Thu	21:00 | 21:54	Saigo no Bansan 最後の晩餐 〜刑事・遠野一行と七人の容疑者〜		EX	Kōichi Satō, Haruma Miura
Jul | Sep	Thu	23:58 | 24:38	Kudo Shinichi he no Chosenjo 工藤新一への挑戦状		YTV	Junpei Mizobata, Shioli Kutsuna
Jul | Sep	Fri	24:12 | 24:53	Yuusha Yoshihiko to Maou no Shiro 勇者ヨシヒコと魔王の城	web	TX	Takayuki Yamada, Haruka Kinami, Tsuyoshi Muro
Jul | Sep	Mon	21:00 | 21:54	Zenkai Girl 全開ガール		CX	Yui Aragaki, Ryo Nishikido

=== Specials ===
Broadcast Date	Air Time (JST)	English Title Japanese Title	Network	Lead Actor/Actress	Web Page	Theme Song	AVG Rating
July 5	21:00 - 22:48	Furusato: Musume no Tabidachi 故郷 〜娘の旅立ち〜	CX	Maki Horikita, Jun Fubuki, Ken Matsudaira	web
July 17	02:10 - 03:10	Tonari no Akuma-chan: Mizu to Mizonokuchi となりの悪魔ちゃん～ミズと溝の口～	CX	Seika Taketomi	web
August 5	21:00 - 23:24	Kono Sekai no Katasumi ni この世界の片隅に	NTV	Keiko Kitagawa, Keisuke Koide	web
		Kasha 火車	EX	Kamikawa Takaya, Sasaki Nozomi, Terawaki Yasufumi

== Autumn (October to December) ==
Broadcasting Period	Day of Week	Air Time (JST)	English Title Japanese Title	Ep.	Network	Lead Actor/Actress	Web Page	Theme Song	AVG Rating
夏 | Nov.	Sun.	20:00 | 20:45	Gō 江〜姫たちの戦国〜		NHK	Juri Ueno	web
Oct. | Dec.	Fri.	22:00 | 22:54	Sengyou Shufu Tantei ~ Watashi wa Shadow (tentative name) 専業主婦探偵〜私はシャドウ		TBS	Fukada Kyoko, Fujiki Naohito, Kiritani Kenta	web
Oct. 3 | Mar. 31, 2012	Mon; Sat	22:00 | 22:54	Carnation カーネーション	86	NHK	Machiko Ono, Chiaki Kuriyama
Oct. | Dec.	Wed.	22:00 | 22:54	Kaseifu no Mita 家政婦のミタ		NTV	Nanako Matsushima	web
Oct. | Dec.	Fri.	24:12 |	Koko ga Uwasa no El Palacio ここが噂のエル・パラシオ		TX	Machiko Ono, Chiaki Kuriyama
Oct. | Dec.	Sun.	21:00 | 21:54	Nankyoku Tairiku 南極大陸		TBS	Haruka Ayase, Kuriyama Chiaki	web
Oct. | Dec.	Tue.	21:00 | 21:54	Nazotoki wa Dinner no Ato de 謎解きはディナーのあとで		CX	Sho Sakurai, Keiko Kitagawa
Oct. | Dec.	Thu.	22:00 | 22:54	Mitsu no Aji: A Taste Of Honey 蜜の味～Ａ Ｔａｓｔｅ Ｏｆ Ｈｏｎｅｙ～		CX	Nana Eikura, Miho Kanno, ARATA	web
Oct. | Dec.	Sun.	21:00 | 21:54	Boku to Star no 99 Nichi 僕とスターの99日		CX	Hidetoshi Nishijima, Kim Tae-hee	web
Oct. | Dec.	Mon.	21:00 | 21:54	Watashi ga Renai Dekinai Riyuu 私が恋愛できない理由		CX	Karina, Yuriko Yoshitaka, Yuko Oshima	web
Oct. | Dec.	Thu.	23:58 | 24:38	Himitsu Chouhouin Erika 秘密諜報員 エリカ		NTV	Chiaki Kuriyama, Tetta Sugimoto	web
Oct. | Dec.	Fri.	23:15 | 24:15	11 Nin mo Iru! 11人もいる!		EX	Ryunosuke Kamiki	Archived from the original September 23, 2011

== See also ==
- List of Japanese television dramas
