= 2010 Japanese television dramas =

←2009 - 2010 - 2011→

This is a list of Japanese television dramas shown within Japan during the year of 2010.

== Winter ==
Title (Japanese title)	Cast	Broadcast period	Episodes	Network	Avg. Ratings	Notes	Ref
853 (853〜刑事・加茂伸之介)	Yasufumi Terawaki, Yasuko Tomita	14/1/2010- 11/3/2010	8	EX	10.3%		
Aibou: Season 8 (相棒 8)	Yutaka Mizutani, Mitsuhiro Oikawa	14/10/2009- 10/3/2010	19	EX	17.7%		
Akakabu Kenji Kyoto-hen (赤かぶ検事京都篇)	Baijaku Nakamura, Rei Kikukawa	13/1/2010- 10/3/2010	9	TBS	6.1%	Based on a novel	
Angel Bank (エンゼルバンク)	Kyōko Hasegawa	14/1/2010- 11/3/2010	8	EX	6.1%	Based on a manga	
Code Blue 2 (コード・ブルー2)	Tomohisa Yamashita, Yui Aragaki	11/1/2010- 22/3/2010	11	CX	16.6%	Based on a novel	
Hancho 2 (ハンチョウ2)	Kuranosuke Sasaki	11/1/2010- 22/3/2010	11	TBS	11.3%	Based on a novel	
Indigo no Yoru (インディゴの夜)	Yoko Moriguchi	5/1/2010- 4/2/2012	63	CX	5.0%	Based on a novel	
Kinoshita Bucho to Boku (木下部長とボク)	Itsuji Itao	14/1/2010- 1/4/2012	12	YTV, NTV	-		
Magerarenai Onna (曲げられない女)	Miho Kanno, Hiromi Nagasaku	13/1/2010- 17/3/2010	10	NTV	14.6%		
Massugu na Otoko (まっすぐな男)	Ryuta Sato, Kyoko Fukada	12/1/2010- 16/3/2010	10	CX	9.2%		
Nakanai to Kimeta Hi (泣かないと決めた日)	Nana Eikura, Naohito Fujiki	26/1/2010- 16/3/2010	8	CX	11.4%		
Shukumei 1969-2010 (宿命 1969-2010)	Kazuki Kitamura, Eiko Koike	15/1/2010- 12/3/2010	8	EX	6.9%	Based on a novel	
Yamato Nadeshiko Shichi Henge (ヤマトナデシコ七変化)	Kazuya Kamenashi, Aya Omasa	15/1/2010- 19/3/2010	10	TBS	8.3%	Based on a manga	
Tomehane! (とめはねっ!)	Aki Asakura	7/1/2010- 11/2/2010	6	NHK	5.88%	Based on a manga	
