= Kazoku no Uta =

- Promotional poster
- Genre: Drama
- Starring: Joe Odagiri
- Country of origin: Japan
- Original language: Japanese
- No. of seasons: 1
- No. of episodes: 8

Production
- Camera setup: Multi-camera
- Running time: 54 minutes
- Production companies: Fuji TV; Kyodo TV

Original release
- Network: Fuji TV
- Release: April 15 – June 3, 2012

Kazoku no Uta (家族のうた; literally Family Song) is a 2012 Japanese television series. It features actor Joe Odagiri as a father of three children and a musician who was once very famous, though his popularity has since waned.

Before its debut, Kazoku no Uta was hit by accusations of plagiarism. The script was said to be extremely similar to the storyline of the 1987 television series Papa wa Newscaster. The script of Kazoku no Uta was subsequently changed due to this accusation.

Kazoku no Uta was aired from 15 April 2012 to 6 June 2012 as part of Fuji Television's Dramatic Sunday time slot, which airs every Sunday from 9 p.m. to 9:54 p.m. The number of episode was cut from the usual 10 to 8 after this series received continuously low viewership ratings. The two remaining episodes were replaced by special episodes of the drama Hayami-san to Yobareru Hi. The theme song is "Gekkō" (月光) by Kazuyoshi Saito.

== Story ==
In 1997, the rock band achieved fame with their debut single "Going". However, it subsequently broke up after the band leader Seigi announced that he will make his solo debut. Fifteen years later, in 2012, Seigi has already fallen out of the public eye, though he still clings on stubbornly to his outdated style of music. Only his agent and some die-hard fans are still willing to support him.

One day, three children who claimed that Seigi is their father suddenly appears. Two of them are siblings whose mother had recently died, while the other is left at home alone because her mother frequently runs away with her boyfriends. Seigi eventually takes them in to care for them. Over time, Seigi and the children start to bond after overcoming the many challenges that come their way. Thanks to the influence of his children, Seigi starts to grow out of his selfish and immature ways, and starts to consider the feelings of his children and the people around him.

== Cast ==
=== Hayakawa household ===
- Joe Odagiri as Seigi Hayakawa (早川 正義; 36 years old)

The vocalist and guitarist of the once-famous rock band Under Cloud. The band became very popular after their debut single, Going, was released. He subsequently left the band and made his solo debut, but did not see much popularity. In 2012, he is left with only a radio program presenter job. Despite that, he still maintains his childish and lazy personality. He later starts to mature after living together with his three children, whom he reluctantly adopted. Seigi often quotes The Rolling Stones member Keith Richards to justify his decisions.

- Hana Sugisaki as Kokoro Osawa (大澤 こころ; 13 years old)

A 2nd year junior high student and Seigi's daughter. She is frequently left alone at home by her mother, who always runs away with different men, only to turn up again after she is dumped. One day, Kokoro decides to live with Seigi after she is deceived yet again by her mother's promise of returning back. She is talented in composing music and playing the guitar, and one of her compositions was chosen as the song used in a zoo's advertisement. Later, it was revealed that Kokoro is not actually Seigi's daughter, but instead, the daughter of a now-deceased man. In the end, she decides to forgive her mother and moved Toyama with her mother.

- Ayane Omori as Mitsuki Matsuno (松野 美月; 11 years old)

A grade 6 student in elementary school and Seigi's daughter. She and her brother ran away from an abusive aunt who was taking care of them after their mother's death half a year ago. She corners Seigi one day and demands that he takes them in because he is her father. Reluctant at first, Seigi agreed to take them in. Mitsuki is a strong-willed girl who dislikes housework, a trait that sometimes put her into conflict with Kokoro.

- Kanata Fujimoto as Riku Matsuno (松野 陸; 7 years old)

A grade 2 student in elementary school and Mitsuki's half brother. Their mother married after she gave birth to Mitsuki. Although he is not a blood relative of Seigi's, he looks up to him. He frequently relies on his sister, and is not very good at singing. He favourite phrase is "rock-n-roll".

- Tatsuya Fuji as Hidezou Shoji (東海林 秀蔵; 70 years old)

An old man who appears with Kokoro. He met Kokoro one day while drawing at a park, and later became her confidant. He was the one who helped Kokoro move in with Seigi. He abandoned his family because of his financial problems, and deeply regrets it. He stayed in Seigi's household because he treats Seigi as his son, and wants to help Seigi avoid making the same mistakes as he did previously. He was eventually reunited with his son in the end.

=== Segi's acquaintances ===
- Yūsuke Santamaria as Kosuke Miki
- Shihori Kanjiya as Yoko Aota
- Nene Otsuka as Asako Mizushima
- Tortoise Matsumoto as Akira Mizushima

=== Others ===
- Kento Nakajima as Kosei Sakagami
- Shinji Takeda as Satoru Kamiyama

=== Guest appearances ===
- Kyary Pamyu Pamyu (Episode 1)
- Tokyo Ska Paradise Orchestra (Episode 2)
- Atsuki Kimura (Episode 3)
- Kenichi Asai (Episode 4)
- Michiro Endo (Episode 5)
- Diamond Yukai (Episode 5)
- Nokko (Episode 6)
- Ego-Wrappin' (Episode 7)
- Reichi Nakaido (Episode 8)

== Episodes ==
	Episode title	Romanized title	Translation of title	Broadcast date	Ratings
Ep. 1	自業自得!?	Jigōjitoku!?	What you do is what you get!?	April 15, 2012	6.1%
Ep. 2	我慢すると心が腐るんだよ!	Gaman suruto kokoro ga kusaru nda yo!	Holding it in rots my heart!	April 22, 2012	3.6%
Ep. 3	歌えない僕の気持ちが解る?	Utaenai boku no kimochi ga wakaru?	Can you understand how I feel, not being able to sing?	April 29, 2012	3.4%
Ep. 4	お祭で告白!?届けたい想い…	Omatsuri de kokuhaku!? Todoketai omoi…	A confession at the festival!? The feelings I want to convey...	May 6, 2012	3.1%
Ep. 5	家族の前で初めての父親宣言	Kazoku no mae de hajimete no chichioya sengen	First declaration as a father in front of the family	May 13, 2012	3.3%
Ep. 6	今夜、娘のために走ります!	Kon'ya, musume no tame ni hashirimasu!	Tonight, I will run for my daughter!	May 20, 2012	3.8%
Ep. 7	誰かの為に頑張るのもロック	Dareka no tame ni ganbaru no mo rokku	Doing your best for someone is also Rock	May 27, 2012	4.1%
Ep. 8	不器用な父親が唄う愛の歌	Bukiyōna chichioya ga utau ai no uta	Love song from a useless father	June 3, 2012	3.4%
Ratings for Kanto region (average rating: 3.92%)

== Reception ==
The fourth episode of Kazoku no Uta set a record of having the lowest viewership ratings of any prime time dramas (those that are aired from 7 p.m. to 11 p.m.) in the history of Fuji Television's broadcast with a rating of 3.1%. Due to the extremely low ratings, the CEO of Fuji Television announced that this television series will end with only 8 episodes.

The low ratings was attributed to the plagiarism accusation that was brought about before this series debuted. Another reason cited for the dismal performance was the popular TBS's television ATARU. This television series, which was broadcast at the same time as Kazoku no Uta, garnered 19.1% viewership ratings for its first episode.

Preceded by Hayami-san to Yobareru Hi (15/1/2012 - 18/3/2012)	Fuji TV Dramatic Sunday ドラマチック・サンデー; Sundays 21:00 - 21:54 (JST)	Succeeded by Beautiful Rain (July 2012 - September 2012)
