= Sky Castle (Japanese TV series) =

2024 Japanese television series

- SKYキャッスル
- Genre: Satire; Family; Mystery
- Based on: Sky Castle by Yoo Hyun-mi
- Written by: Hiroshi Hashimoto
- Directed by: Naoki Tamura (TV Asahi) Yuuji; Nakamae Kazunari Hoshino
- Starring: Nao Matsushita; Fumino Kimura; Maryjun Takahashi; Koyuki; Manami Higa
- Music by: Yu Takami; Nobuaki; Shinzawa Chiu Osumi
- Ending theme: iri Swamp
- Country of origin: Japan
- Original language: Japanese
- No. of episodes: 9

Production
- Executive producers: Seiko Uchiyama (TV Asahi, EP); Tatsuki Oe (TV Asahi, GP)
- Producers: Soei Hamada (TV Asahi); Ryosuke Yamagata( Kadokawa Daiei Studio ) Misato Kono ( Horipro )
- Running time: 54 minutes
- Production company: TV Asahi

Original release
- Network: ANN (TV Asahi)
- Release: July 25 – September 26, 2024

Related
- Sky Castle

Sky Castle (transl. SKYキャッスル) is a 2024 Japanese TV series; a remake of the 2018 South Korean television drama that also aired in Japan via JTBC. It was airing under the same title Sky Castle on TV Asahi's Thursday Drama slot since July 25, till September 26, 2024. The lead role is played by Nao Matsushita.

SKY Castle is an exclusive townhouse where the wealthiest people can afford living. The series revolves around four families; housewives who want their kids to enter the best high school and their husbands who are neurosurgeons in the same hospital. These people's lives are connected in interesting ways.

After Sky Castle is airing in Japan, it is scheduled to be broadcast and streamed in over 140 countries and regions around the world on Amazon Prime Video and other platforms.

== Cast ==
=== Main characters ===
Asami Sae (39)

Original: Han Seo-jin
Played by: Nao Matsushita

A gorgeous housewife whose real name is Yoko Baba and is married to a doctor. Her maiden name is Okura. She is a perfect celebrity in the town house with an enviable career and looks. She has two daughters. She hid the fact that she originally came from an orphanage called Wakanazono, and to save face, lied about her academic background and work history, saying that she graduated from Harvard University and that her parents were surgeons in the United States, but Izumi, who had moved in across the street, discovered that she was actually Yoko Baba.

Minamisawa Izumi (39)

Original: Lee Soo-im
Played by: Fumino Kimura
(10-year-old: Midori Nakano)

A novelist. A new resident of Sky Castle. Her maiden name is Kubota. She has a simple personality and a pure sense of justice that is unusual for a celebrity, and she has an excellent husband and son, whom she loves as her own child.

Natsume Misaki (36)

Original: Jin Jin-hee
Played by: Mary Jun Takahashi

A former housewife with aspirations of becoming an actress. She has a son. Natsume befriends Asami Sae just to get her daughter's secrets of being a top student at the school.

Nikaido Kyoko (38)

Original: Noh Seung Hye
Played by: Manami Higa

She is a talented and beautiful housewife who also went on to graduate school. She has a son and befriends quickly with the new family's housewife. A woman who would do anything in order to protect her son.

Kujo Ayaka (46)

Original: Kim Joo Young
Played by: Koyuki

Exam coordinator. 100% of students in her care are accepted into their schools of choice. She is a strict person. This woman also earns Ruri's trust and the two get along so well.

=== Asami Family ===
Asami Hideyo (51)

Original: Kang Joonsang
Played by: Seiichi Tanabe

Sae's husband, a well-known neurosurgeon at the prestigious Teito Hospital,who has immaculate surgical skills and is liked by the hospital director for this. A surgeon who would do anything for respect, fame and is obsessed with maintaining a good track. He comes from a rich family, yet is focused on climbing the social ladder. He is also Miku Yamada's father. He used to date Nozomi Yamada, Miku's mother but the two broke up after his mother's rejection. Hideyo gets jealous of the new recruit, whom he looks at as a rival.

Asami Ruri (14)

Original: Kang Ye Seo
Played by: Miu Arai

Sae's eldest daughter. A new third-year student at Koyo Gakuen Junior High School. She was spoiled by Sae and is always boasting about her good grades. She inherited her mother's extreme competitive nature, vainness, self-centeredness, and twisted personality, so she is disliked by those around her and has no popularity. She has a crush on the new neighbors' son.

Asami Maju (12)

Original: Kang Yebin
Played by: Noa Shiroyama

Sae's second daughter. A new first-year student at Koyo Gakuen Junior High School. Compared to her sister, she is not as good at studying, so she is neglected by Sae and feels inferior. Maju thinks that her parents only care for Ruri. She befriends Miku shortly after the latter moves into their house.

Asami Yukino (73)

Original: Madame Yoon
Played by: Mariko Fuji

Hideyo's mother, who comes from a distinguished family. She hates her son's wife, Sae, who lies and has false academic credentials and career records. She constantly makes snide remarks and bullies her in every way possible.

=== Minamisawa Family ===
Minamisawa Kohei (45)

Original: Hwang Chi-young
Played by: Ryohei Otani

Izumi's husband, a neurosurgeon who graduated from a local medical school, was scouted by the hospital director and began working at Teito Hospital. A rival of Hideyo. A doctor who cares about his patients wellbeing and has a good heart.

Minamisawa Aoba (14)

Original: Hwang Woo-joo
Played by: Aito Sakamoto

Son of Kohei, who remarried Izumi after his wife died. A new third-year student at the prestigious Koyo Gakuen Junior High School. He doesn't show his interest in Ruri, but likes Miku.

=== Natsume Family ===
Natsume Ryotaru (42)

Original: Woo Yang-woo
Played by: Honda Riki

Misaki's husband and a neurosurgeon at Teito Hospital. He is foolish and befriends Hideyo.

Natsume Kensaku (14)

Original: Woo Soo-han
Played by: Fumi Matsufuji

Misaki's only son. A new third-year student at Koyo Gakuen Junior High School, who hates studying. He gets along well with Sho and the other kids.

=== Nikaido Family ===
Wataru Nikaido (49)

Original: Cha Min-hyuk
Played by: Kosuke Suzuki

Kyoko's husband and a neurosurgeon at Teito Hospital. He thinks the most prestigious people are the ones on the top of the social pyramid, so in this mindset; he teaches his son at home. He is self-centered and has a strict personality.

Sho Nikaido (14)

Original: Cha Seo-joon
Played by: Fuga Shibasaki

Kyoko's only son. A new third-year student at Koyo Gakuen Junior High School. A kind and quiet boy who dislikes his father's method of teaching and studying.

=== Saejima Family ===
Haruto Saejima (15)

Original: Park Yeong-jae
Played by: Riku Onishi

The only son of Tetsuto and Kaori. Despite not having very good grades, he managed to pass the highly competitive entrance exam for Teito Medical University High School. However, he did not want to pass the exam, and wrote a diary about the real struggles of him preparing for the exam on the tablet that Sae had lent to Kaori, driving Kaori to suicide.

Kaori Saejima (46)

Original: Lee Myung-joo
Played by: Naho Toda

Haruto's mother. A woman with a seemingly perfect family and life. After seeing the diary that Haruto had written on the tablet, she committed suicide.

Tetsuto Saejima (55)

Original: Park Soo-chang
Played by: Jun Hashimoto

Kaori's husband. He is the head of the neurosurgery department at Teito Hospital and an elite who is expected to be the next hospital director. He is a good senior to Hideyo.

=== Others ===
Miku Yamada (14)

Original: Kim Hye-na
Played by: Sora Tamaki

A smart and kind girl who competes with Ruri and Aoba for grades. Later,she moves into the Asami house for tutoring Maju, who is excited for having a tutor. A new third-year student at Koyo Gakuen Junior High School. She aims to become a doctor while working part-time jobs every day to care for her mother who is hospitalized at Teito Hospital and to pay for her treatment. She receives money from Rei by completing Yuma's school assignments. After seeing a photo in the picture book "Sky Castle," she finds out that Hideyo and Nozomi were dating and eventually finds out that he is her biological father. She harbors intense hatred for her half-sister Ruri, who has never known hardship. In the 9th episode, she suffers a tragic end.

Nozomi Yamada (41)

Original: Kim Eun Hye
Played by: Kurara Emi

Miku's mother, who was a nurse back when she used to date Hideyo. The two loved each other but later broke up after the rejection of Hideyo's mother. As time passed, she had become seriously ill and got hospitalized at Teito Hospital. Realizing that she didn't have much time left, she tried to contact Hideyo to tell him that he has a daughter, but failed. After this,she died.(Episode 4).

Eiji Nagamine (37)

Original: Cho Tae-jun
Played by: Kou Maehara

Ayaka's capable secretary. He is her right hand and Ayaka trusts him.

Rei Kato (40)

Played by: Risa Naito

She is the mother of Kato Yuma, a new third-year student at Koyo Gakuen Junior High School.

Yuma Kato

Played by: Yuto Otsuka

Rei Kato's son. He has Miku help him with his school assignments.

Sakura Akikawa (22)

Original: Lee Ga Eul
Played by: Arisa Matsuda

A former housekeeper for the Saejima family. She was a good friend to Haruto, but she suddenly left the Saejima family six months ago.

Takashi Okochi (68)

Original: Choi In-ho
Played by: Takehiko Ono

The director of Teito Hospital.

=== Guest ===
==== Episode 1 ====
- Host

Played by: Yuki Hirako ( Alco & Peace )

He is the moderator of an educational seminar hosted by Teishin Bank, which is open only to a limited number of VIPs.

- Receptionist

Played by: Haruka Miwa

Registration for the seminar. Yoko Baba

- Performer

Played by: Honoka Yoshida

==== Episode 2 ====
- Yoko Baba

A girl chasing the police car in which her arrested father is riding. When she was in sixth grade, she left the orphanage "Wakanaen" and was taken in by a relative, and became Okura Sae. Now that she is married, she uses the surname Asami.

- Teacher

Played by: Maori

A teacher reads the picture book "Sky Castle" to Yoko Baba at Wakanaen, the orphanage where she is staying.

==== Episode 2 ====
- Girls

Played by: Orion Maeda, Sasara Yamamoto, Yo Funakawa, Hisaki Goto

They are the classmate of Yoko Baba and Izumi in elementary school. They bully Yoko when she finds out that she lied about her parents being doctors in America.

==== Episode 3 ====
- Teacher

Played by: Hajime Ishii

Examiner for the midterm exams of Koyo Gakuen Junior High School Class 3-Special A.

- Governor Hasuike

Played by: Tsuyoshi Nakano

The surgery was performed by Kohei Minamisawa.

- Worker

Played by: Masato Kato

Renovating the Nikaido family's children's room.

- Clerk

Played by: Hideto Suzuki

The convenience store clerk where Asami Masaru tried to shoplift a magazine.

- Host

Played by: Keiichiro Hashimoto

Moderator of Governor Hasuike's press conference upon his discharge from hospital.

==== Episode 4 ====
- Shiori Kinosaki

Played by: Kana Kajiwara

When Izumi was aspiring to be a high school teacher, she was a student of the school where she was doing her teaching practice. She was sending out an SOS and Izumi was unable to save her, leading to her suicide, which had a major impact on the way Izumi lived her life thereafter.

- Clerk

Played by: Erika Natori

A clerk at the accounting reception desk of Teito Hospital.

- Doctor

Played by: Hiroyuki Yamamoto

Yamada Nozomi's doctor.

==== Episode 5 ====
- Neighbors

Played by: China Kusumoto、Kaori Isoyama, Emiri Tokunaga、Satoko Kikuchi、Chisa Yamaguchi, Hatsumi Ishizuka

The residents of Sky Castle are talking about rumors, such as Sae's background, which she tried to stop Izumi from writing a novel, being a lie and having come from an institution.

== Production ==
The series will be broadcast and streamed in over 140 countries and regions around the world on the other streaming platforms and on Amazon Prime Video. Most parts of the series were filmed in a condominium complex located in Yokosuka, Kanagawa prefecture.

== Viewership ==
Average TV viewership ratings
Ep.	Original Broadcast Date	Title	Director	Ratings
1	July 25, 2024	Sky Castle Battle Begins	Naoki Tamura	8.5%
2	August 1, 2024	Shocking Past Revealed	Naoki Tamura	5.3%
3	August 8, 2024	Breaking Down Walls	Yuji Nakamae	5.4%
4	August 15, 2024	Hold Secrets From The Past	Yuji Nakamae	5.4%
5	August 22, 2024	True Face Revealed	Naoki Tamura	6.3%
6	August 29, 2024	Husband Has A Secret Child?	Kazunari Hoshino	6.7%
7	September 12, 2024	The Mastermind Revealed	Naoki Tamura	6.6%
8	September 19, 2024	All Mysteries Revealed	Kazunari Hoshino	7.6%
9	September 26, 2024	Unexpected Truth (Finale)	Naoki Tamura	7.9%
(Viewer ratings are from Video Research, Kanto region, households, real time)

- The first episode will be extended by six minutes and broadcast from 9:00 p.m. to 10:00 p.m.
