= Descending Stories: Showa Genroku Rakugo Shinju =

Japanese manga series and its adaptations

- Cover of the first tankōbon volume

昭和元禄落語心中 (Shōwa Genroku Rakugo Shinjū)
- Genre: Historical, drama
- Manga
- Written by: Haruko Kumota
- Published by: Kodansha
- English publisher: NA: Kodansha USA
- Magazine: Itan
- Original run: 25 March 2010 – 7 June 2016
- Volumes: 10
- Original video animation

Yotaro Hourou-hen
- Directed by: Shinichi Omata (Note: Credited under the pseudonym Mamoru Hatakeyama.)
- Produced by: Yōichi Orihashi
- Written by: Jun Kumagai
- Music by: Kana Shibue
- Studio: Studio Deen
- Released: 6 March 2015 – 7 August 2015
- Episodes: 2
- Anime television series
- Directed by: Shinichi Omata
- Produced by: Akiko Yada; Yoshihiko Yamazaki; Hiroshi Kamei
- Written by: Jun Kumagai
- Music by: Kana Shibue
- Studio: Studio Deen
- Licensed by: Crunchyroll
- Original network: MBS, TBS, CBC, BS-TBS
- Original run: 9 January 2016 – 25 March 2017
- Episodes: 25
- Television drama
- Directed by: Yuki Tanada; Makoto Kiyohiro; Tatsuo Kobayashi
- Written by: Daisuke Habara
- Music by: Takatsugu Muramatsu
- Original network: NHK
- Original run: 12 October 2018 – 14 December 2018
- Episodes: 10
- icon

Descending Stories: Showa Genroku Rakugo Shinju (昭和元禄落語心中, Shōwa Genroku Rakugo Shinjū; "Flourishing Shōwa – Rakugo Double Suicide") is a Japanese manga series written and illustrated by Haruko Kumota. It was serialized in Kodansha's Josei magazine Itan from 2010 to 2016 and collected in ten volumes. The manga was released in North America by Kodansha USA. The manga was adapted into two original video animations by Studio Deen which were bundled with special editions of the seventh and eighth manga volumes on 6 March – 7 August 2015, respectively. It was also adapted into an anime television series which aired between 9 January and 2 April 2016. A second season of the anime television series aired between 7 January 2017 and 25 March 2017. A live-action series adaptation aired on NHK between 12 October and 14 December 2018.

== Plot ==
A man is released from prison and becomes the apprentice of a famous rakugo performer, Yakumo Yurakutei. The story focuses on the backstories of the performers and their struggle to gain popularity, following Yakumo's apprenticeship and rise to fame and his friendship with fellow performer Sukeroku.

== Characters ==
=== Main characters ===
Eighth Generation Yakumo Yurakutei (八代目 有楽亭 八雲, Hachidaime Yūrakutei Yakumo) / Kikuhiko (菊比古)
Voiced by: Akira Ishida
Played by: Masaki Okada
A rakugo storyteller known for his perfectionist style of rakugo. His birth name is never specified, although Sukeroku took to calling him "Bon". He was given the name "Kikuhiko" when he became a student of the Seventh Generation Yakumo. He was originally a dancer, but he ruined his leg in an accident and ended up being given to Yakumo. During his time as a student, he would struggle to find his own rakugo having placed too much emphasis on flawless execution, but he was able to find inspiration thanks to Sukeroku. He would go on to inherit the Yakumo name, but initially he refused, thinking that he was not worthy of it. Following the deaths of Sukeroku and Miyokichi, he inherited the name to fulfill Sukeroku's vision of keeping rakugo going in a time when tastes in entertainment change. He would later on become the head of the rakugo association.
Second Generation Sukeroku Yurakutei (二代目 有楽亭 助六, Nidaime Yūrakutei Sukeroku) / Hatsutaro (初太郎, Hatsutarō)
Voiced by: Koichi Yamadera
Played by: Ikusaburo Yamazaki
A rakugo storyteller known for his freestyle brand of rakugo. His actual birth name is never specified, but Kikuhiko used to call him by the diminutive "Shin" (信). He was given the name "Hatsutaro" when he became a student of the Seventh Generation Yakumo. Later on, he would change his name to "Sukeroku". Despite his talent for rakugo, Yakumo refused to pass on his name to him due to the rebellious nature of his rakugo. Following a heated argument, he was expelled from the school. He would move to the countryside to marry Miyokichi and start a family where he would spend his life drinking away in depression until Kikuhiko arrived to bring him back to doing rakugo again. He and Miyokichi died when they fell from a balcony in an inn where Sukeroku gave his last performance with Kikuhiko.
Third Generation Sukeroku Yurakutei (三代目 有楽亭 助六, Sandaime Yūrakutei Sukeroku) / Yotaro (与太郎, Yotarō) / Kyoji (強次, Kyōji)
Voiced by: Tomokazu Seki
Played by: Ryō Ryūsei
An aspiring storyteller who was recently released from prison. He was born "Kyoji" and was given the name "Yotaro" when he became a student. Having been a big admirer of Kikuhiko's rakugo he decides to become his student. His desire to inherit Sukeroku's name that leads to conflicts between him and Yakumo due to Yakumo not wanting his brand of rakugo to be corrupted. Ten years after being accepted by Yakumo, he is promoted to a shin'uchi and formally becomes the Third Generation Sukeroku Yurakutei.
Miyokichi (みよ吉) / Yurie (ユリエ)
Voiced by: Megumi Hayashibara
Played by: Aya Ōmasa
A young woman who worked as a Geisha who first appeared as the Seventh Generation Yakumo's mistress whom he met in Manchuria. She became attracted to Kikuhiko due to his aloof personality and the two developed an on-again-off-again relationship. Eventually Kikuhiko rejected her and out of spite she began a relationship with Sukeroku which resulted in her becoming pregnant with their daughter, Konatsu. Sukeroku and Miyokichi eventually left for the countryside after Sukeroku's expulsion. However, she did not care for Sukeroku or Konatsu and instead turned to prostitution to earn money. After Kikuhiko appeared and rejected her advances again, she attempted suicide, but Sukeroku convinced her to stop. However, she slipped from a balcony and in his attempt to save her, both Miyokichi and Sukeroku fell to their deaths. Her true given name was "Yurie".
Konatsu (小夏)
Voiced by: Yu Kobayashi
Played by: Riko Narumi
Sukeroku's and Miyokichi's daughter. She learned her father's style of rakugo to entertain customers at a soba shop in the countryside. Following the death of her parents, Kikuhiko became her legal guardian. She holds a great deal of resentment for Kikuhiko as she initially believed he was responsible for her father's death, and more recently because he represents the 'old-fashioned' traditional rakugo that does not allow women to participate. She later gave birth to a child named Shinnosuke whose biological father's identity is not revealed. Later in the series, it was revealed that she had witnessed the death of Sukeroku and Miyokichi but had lost her memories of the incident.

=== Supporting characters ===
Eisuke Higuchi (樋口 栄助, Higuchi Eisuke)
Voiced by: Toshihiko Seki
A popular writer who is interested in helping Yotaro in writing new rakugo. In his youth, he had admired Miyokichi and had a crush on her. This eventually extended to his obsession with Yakumo, whose apprentice he tried to become.
Matsuda (松田)
Voiced by: Shigeru Ushiyama
Matsuda is Yakumo's retainer and driver. He has been employed by the Yakumos since the Seventh Generation.
Fourth Generation Mangetsu Tsuburaya (四代目 円屋 萬月, Yondaime Tsuburaya Mangetsu)
Voiced by: Koji Yusa
Yotaro's fellow storyteller from Kyoto. He had stopped performing rakugo for some time after his father's death.
Seventh Generation Yakumo Yurakutei (七代目 有楽亭 八雲, Nanadaime Yūrakutei Yakumo)
Voiced by: Hiroshi Yanaka
A famous storyteller and Kikuhiko's and Sukeroku's teacher.
Amaken (アマケン)
Voiced by: Kappei Yamaguchi
Rakugo critic and fan of Yakumo. His father Amano was a literary critic. Amaken is disliked by Yakumo.
Ani-san (アニさん)
Voiced by: Shou Sudou
Bansai Tsuburaya (円屋 萬歳, Tsuburaya Bansai)
Voiced by: Chafurin
Shinnosuke (信之助)
Voiced by: Mikako Komatsu (child) / Yūki Ono
Konatsu's son who greatly admires Yakumo's rakugo. Yotaro believes his father to be the boss of the gang that he once belonged to. His parentage is never confirmed.
Koyuki (小雪)
Voiced by: Ayaka Asai
Konatsu and Yotaro's daughter.

== Media ==
=== Manga ===
The manga series written and illustrated by Haruko Kumota began its serialization in the Itan magazine published by Kodansha from 25 March 2010 to 7 June 2016. The manga has been compiled in ten tankōbon volumes, with the first volume being published on 7 July 2011, and the tenth and final volume being published on 7 September 2016. Kodansha USA licensed the manga for release in North America in December 2016, with the first volume published on 23 May 2017 and the last on 31 December 2018.

==== Volumes ====
No.	Original release date	Original ISBN	English release date	English ISBN
1	7 July 2011	978-4-06-380514-7	23 May 2017	978-1-63236-469-2
"Yotaro's Odyssey" (与太郎放浪篇, Yotarō Hōrō Hen): "I" (其の一, Sono Ichi); "II" (其の二, Sono Ni); "III" (其の三, Sono San); "IV" (其の四, Sono Yon)
2	6 January 2012	978-4-06-380554-3	18 July 2017	978-1-63236-470-8
"Yotaro's Odyssey" (与太郎放浪篇, Yotarō Hōrō Hen): "V" (其の五, Sono Go); "Yakumo and Sukeroku" (八雲と助六篇, Yakumo to Sukeroku Hen): "I" (其の一, Sono Ichi); "II" (其の二, Sono Ni)
3	5 October 2012	978-4-06-380592-5	19 September 2017	978-1-63236-471-5
"Yakumo and Sukeroku" (八雲と助六篇, Yakumo to Sukeroku Hen): "III" (其の三, Sono San); "IV" (其の四, Sono Yon); "V" (其の五, Sono Go)
4	7 June 2013; 5 June 2013 (special edition)	978-4-06-380631-1; 978-4-06-358440-0 (special edition)	7 November 2017	978-1-63236-472-2
"Yakumo and Sukeroku" (八雲と助六篇, Yakumo to Sukeroku Hen): "VI" (其の六, Sono Roku); "VII" (其の七, Sono Nana); "VIII" (其の八, Sono Hachi)
5	7 February 2014	978-4-06-380670-0	13 February 2018	978-1-63-236543-9
"Yakumo and Sukeroku" (八雲と助六篇, Yakumo to Sukeroku Hen): "IX" (其の九, Sono Kyū); "Sukeroku Again" (助六再び篇, Sukeroku Futatabi Hen): "I" (其の一, Sono Ichi); "II" (其の二, Sono Ni)
6	7 August 2014	978-4-06-380708-0	17 April 2018	978-1-63-236544-6
"Sukeroku Again" (助六再び篇, Sukeroku Futatabi Hen): "III" (其の三, Sono San); "IV" (其の四, Sono Yon); "V" (其の五, Sono Go)
7	6 March 2015	978-4-06-380752-3; 978-4-06-358742-5 (special edition)	5 June 2018	978-1-63-236545-3
"Sukeroku Again" (助六再び篇, Sukeroku Futatabi Hen): "VI" (其の六, Sono Roku); "VII" (其の七, Sono Nana); "VIII" (其の八, Sono Hachi)
8	7 August 2015	978-4-06-380788-2; 978-4-06-358744-9 (special edition)	7 August 2018	978-1-63-236546-0
"Sukeroku Again" (助六再び篇, Sukeroku Futatabi Hen): "IX" (其の九, Sono Kyū); "X" (其の十, Sono Jū); "XI" (其の十一, Sono Jū Ichi)
9	5 February 2016	978-4-06-380832-2	2 October 2018	978-1-63-236661-0
"Sukeroku Again" (助六再び篇, Sukeroku Futatabi Hen): "XII" (其の十二, Sono Jū Ni); "XIII" (其の十三, Sono Jū San); "XIV" (其の十四, Sono Jū Yon)
10	7 September 2016	978-4-06-380876-6; 978-4-06-362340-6 (special edition)	31 December 2018	978-1-63-236662-7
"Sukeroku Again" (助六再び篇, Sukeroku Futatabi Hen): "XV" (其の十五, Sono Jū Go); "XVI" (其の十六, Sono Jū Roku); "XVII" (其の十七, Sono Jū Nana)

=== Anime ===
The seventh and eighth volumes of the manga included a 2-episode original anime DVD entitled Yotarō Hōrō Hen (与太郎放浪篇) produced by Studio Deen.

An anime television adaptation also produced by Studio Deen premiered on 9 January 2016. It was directed by Shinichi Omata (under the pseudonym Mamoru Hatakeyama) and written by Jun Kumagai, with music by Kana Shibue. Three promotional videos were released on KING RECORDS's YouTube page prior to the anime's premiere: the first on 6 October 2015, the second on 10 November 2015, and the final PV on 14 December 2015. The opening theme of the first season was "Usurai Shinjū" (薄ら氷心中; lit. "Thin-ice Double Suicide") composed by Sheena Ringo and performed by Megumi Hayashibara. The first episode combines both parts of the 2015 Yotarō Hōrō Hen original anime DVDs (edited down to 48 minutes for the broadcast version, whereas the home video release is the full "director's cut", with a runtime of 82 minutes). Crunchyroll added the anime to its simulcast stream in 2016. The first season had been licensed for a UK home video release by Anime Limited in 2016, but in 2017 they announced they lost the rights and canceled all plans for home video releases.

An announcement revealing the anime's second season was posted on the creator's Twitter account. The second season, titled Descending Stories: Shōwa Genroku Rakugo Shinjū (昭和元禄落語心中～助六再び篇～, Shōwa Genroku Rakugo Shinjū: Sukeroku Futatabi-hen), premiered on 7 January 2017. Crunchyroll later added the series for its streaming. The staff from the first season reprised their roles in the second season. The opening theme of the second season was "Imawa no Shinigami" (今際の死神; lit. "The Death in His Dying Moment") composed by Sheena Ringo and performed by Megumi Hayashibara.

=== Live-action series ===
NHK announced in July 2018 that a live-action series adaptation was green-lit. The live-action series is directed by Yuki Tanada, Makoto Kiyohiro and Tatsuo Kobayashi, with scripts written by Daisuke Habara, music by Takatsugu Muramatsu and rakugo supervision by Kyōtarō Yanagiya. Masaki Okada, Ryō Ryūsei, Riko Narumi, Aya Ōmasa and Ikusaburo Yamazaki portrayed Yakumo, Yotarō, Konatsu, Miyokichi and Sukeroku, respectively. It aired on NHK between 12 October and 14 December 2018 in ten episodes.

=== Musical ===
A musical adaptation ran in Tokyo at the Tokyo Theatre Orb from February to March 2025, in Osaka at the Festival Hall from March to April, and in Fukuoka in April, with Koike Shūichirō writing the script and directing. The stage play starred Ikusaburo Yamazaki as Sukeroku, Rio Asumi as Miyokichi, and Yūta Furukawa as Yakumo.

== Reception ==
The series was nominated for the 5th Manga Taishō, receiving 49 points and placing fourth among the fifteen nominees. It was also nominated for the 17th Tezuka Osamu Cultural Prize. It ranked second on the 2012 Kono Manga ga Sugoi! Top 20 Manga for Female Readers survey, and it was fourteenth in the 2013 edition. It was also number seven in the 2013 Comic Natalie Grand Prize and it won an Excellence Award for manga at the 17th Japan Media Arts Festival Awards. It also won the 38th Kodansha Manga Award for Best General Manga. The manga won Kumota the New Creator Prize category of the 21st Tezuka Osamu Cultural Prize in 2017.

Volume 3 sold 24,541 copies by 7 October 2012.

Nick Creamer from Anime News Network gave the first season of the anime an "A" score, describing it as "An intentionally theatrical tragedy, staged something like a rakugo performance itself", and praising its "Strong underlying narrative to gorgeous direction and top-tier performances."
