= Charlotte Kate Fox =

American actress

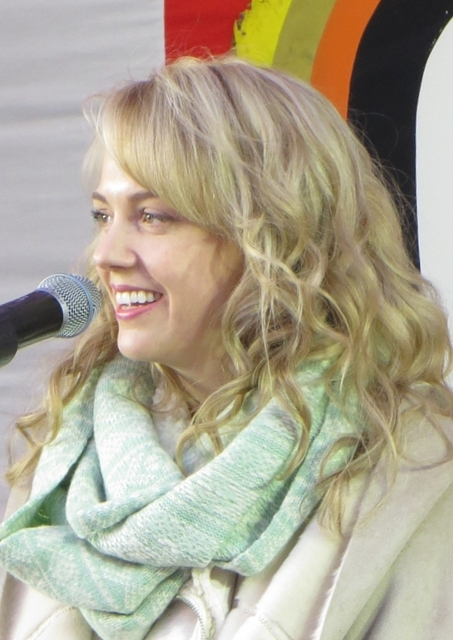
- Fox in 2015
- Born: Charlotte Elizabeth Demo Varney; August 14, 1985 (age 41); Santa Fe, New Mexico, U.S.
- Occupation: Actress
- Years active: 2008–present
- Spouse(s): John Paul Moore (m. 2014; div. 2016) Christian Monsen (m. 2018)

Charlotte Kate Fox (born Charlotte Elizabeth Demo Varney; August 14, 1985) is an American actress. She is best known for starring in the Japanese drama series Massan (2014–2015), which made her the first non-Japanese lead of an asadora. She has since worked primarily in Japan.

== Early life ==
Charlotte Kate Fox was born Charlotte Elizabeth Demo Varney in Santa Fe, New Mexico, on August 14, 1985, the daughter of real estate agent Cynthia Demo and construction industry worker Edward Latin Varney III. She has a half-brother named Matthew, who is 16 years older than her. When Fox was nine, her parents divorced. Her mother remarried John Fox and the two had a son named William. At the age of 16, she left her Catholic high school and began homeschooling in order to devote more time to acting. She studied theater at Marymount Manhattan College in New York for seven months, but left to enroll at the College of Santa Fe in her hometown. She graduated with a BFA in Theater in 2008.

After two years of odd jobs, which included working as the personal assistant to television presenter John Walsh, Fox applied to Northern Illinois University and was accepted in 2010. She graduated with an MFA in 2013. During her time at the university, she returned to New York to attend summer workshops at the Stella Adler Studio of Acting. In 2015, she received an honorary doctorate from the College of Santa Fe (which had since been renamed to the Santa Fe University of Art and Design) and was the commencement speaker at the ceremony.

== Career ==
Fox began her career at the age of 16, when she appeared as an extra in the Starz series Crash. After that, she appeared in professional and regional theater productions, eventually obtaining her union membership while performing in the Actor's Theatre of Charlotte's Venus in Fur as Vanda. She appeared in smaller independent films until she was cast in 150-episode Japanese drama series Massan, making her the first non-Japanese lead of an asadora. She starred as Ellie, a character inspired by Japan-based Scottish businesswoman Rita Taketsuru. Fox was chosen from among 521 applicants (232 from Japan, 289 from outside Japan).

Fox appeared in all 150 episodes of Massan. Her performance was entirely in Japanese, with the exception of occasional scenes spoken in English, such as retrospective scenes in the character's home in Scotland, which were filmed in Japan in locations such as Hokkaido. Fox had no experience in the Japanese language nor had she visited Japan prior to travelling there to perform her screen test. Each line of Fox's script included three additional lines, the first of which was the Romanized script of the Japanese line, followed by the translated line in English, and finally by the word-for-word literal translation in English which follows the Japanese word order. This way Fox would not only learn the Japanese lines but also acknowledge where each word would occur in a given line, thus acting according to the Japanese word order whether the lines were uttered by her or by her co-performers. This made Fox's script ten times longer than the other actors'. "If I had been in Charlotte's position, I would have run away to America," said Tetsuji Tamayama, the co-lead. When polled by NHK as to the reasons for watching Massan, 60% of the viewers chose Fox as the reason, second only to the "interesting story and theme" at 65%.

The final episode of Massan aired on March 28, 2015. The show recorded the mean audience ratings of 21.1% through its run, ranking third-highest of the past 20 asadora titles.

In February 2015, an announcement was made that Fox had been cast in the role of the lead character Roxie Hart in the Broadway musical production of Chicago, which has been continuously running at the Ambassador Theatre in New York since 1996. She performed there from November 2 to November 15, 2015. Fox also performed in Japan on a tour of Chicago in Tokyo from December 4 to December 23, 2015 and in Osaka December 26 and 27, 2015.

On August 19, 2015, NHK aired on its satellite broadcasting channel a documentary program entitled あの歌に出会いたい~シャーロットの沖縄歌探しの旅～(I Want to Meet That Song – Charlotte's Journey in Search of Okinawa's Songs), in which Fox was the principal traveler. This was her first trip ever to Okinawa.

On September 5, 2015, TV Asahi of Japan aired a made-for-TV movie entitled 名探偵キャサリン (Detective Catherine), based on the detective novel series by Misa Yamamura (山村美紗), in which Fox performed in the lead role of Catherine Turner, a multilingual Columbia University graduate and the only daughter of a former vice president of the United States. The show was entirely in Japanese, except where English was appropriate, as was the case with Massan.

== Other ventures ==
On April 29, 2015, Fox released a single music CD entitled Gondola no Uta in Japan. She then released an album entitled Wabi Sabi, produced by American artist Kishi Bashi, on August 19, 2015. From August 18 to September 8, 2015, Fox performed an eight-city concert tour across Japan for the new album, starting in Shibuya, Tokyo and ending in Natori, Miyagi.

As of August 2015, Fox has appeared in six television commercials in Japan, including those for AEON and Nissan.

== Personal life ==
Fox was married to John Paul Moore from 2014 until their divorce in 2016. She married Christian Monsen on October 20, 2018.

== Filmography ==
=== Films ===
- Buried Cain (2014)
- Detective Catherine (2015)
- Meitantei Katherine: Kieta Sôzokunin (2016)
- The Kodai Family (2016)
- Eating Women (2018)
- Talking the Pictures (2019)

=== Television ===
- Crash (2008)
- Massan (2014–2015), Elizabeth "Ellie" Kameyama
- Shizumanu Taiyō (2016)
- Beppinsan (2016–2017)
- Our House (2016)
- Doctor X (2017)
- Shachoshitsu no Fuyu (2017)
- Smartphone in the Brain (2017)
- Three Old Men (2017)
- Wild Hokkaido (2017–present)
- Brother and Sister (2018)
- Idaten (2019), Annie Shepley Omori
- The Ghost Writer's Wife (2025–2026), Eliza Belsland
