= GeGeGe no Nyōbō =

2008 autobiography by Nunoe Mura

- Author: Nunoe Mura
- Original title: ゲゲゲの女房
- Language: Japanese
- Genre: Autobiography
- Publisher: Jitsugyo no Nihon Sha
- Publication date: March 7, 2008
- Publication place: Japan
- Pages: 256
- ISBN: 978-4408107271
- OCLC: 318986789

GeGeGe no Nyōbō (ゲゲゲの女房, Gegege's Wife) is an autobiography written by Nunoe Mura and published in 2008. It details her life as the wife of the manga artist Shigeru Mizuki, especially their struggles against poverty before he became successful. It has sold over 500,000 copies.

In 2010, it was adapted into an Asadora television series starring Nao Matsushita, and a film starring Kazue Fukiishi.

== Television series ==
GeGeGe no Nyōbō
- Written by: Mutsumi Yamamoto
- Starring: Nao Matsushita; Osamu Mukai; Yōko Nogiwa; Narimi Arimori; Akina Minami; Taiyo Sugiura; Ren Osugi; Morio Kazama; Yūko Kotegawa; Hiroaki Murakami; Keiko Takeshita; Keiko Matsuzaka
- Country of origin: Japan
- Original language: Japanese
- No. of episodes: 156

Production
- Production location: Japan
- Running time: 15 minutes
- Production company: NHK

Original release
- Network: NHK
- Release: March 29 – September 25, 2010

=== Cast ===
- Nao Matsushita as Fumie Murai
- Osamu Mukai as Shigeru Murai
- Takumi Saito

== Film ==
- Kazue Fukiishi as Nunoe Mura
- Kankurō Kudō as Shigeru Mura
- Maki Sakai

Preceded by Wel-kame	Asadora; March 29, 2010 – September 25, 2010	Succeeded by Teppan
