= IS – Otoko Demo Onna Demo Nai Sei =

Japanese manga series

- Cover of the first volume

IS～男でも女でもない性～
- Genre: Drama
- Manga
- Written by: Chiyo Rokuhana
- Published by: Kodansha
- Imprint: KC Kiss
- Magazine: Kiss
- Original run: 2004 – 2009
- Volumes: 17
- Television drama
- Directed by: Takashi Fujio
- Produced by: Noboru Morita; Junpei Nakagawa; Daisaku Yamada
- Written by: Masako Iwamura; Toshio Terada
- Music by: Megumi Shiraishi
- Original network: TV Tokyo
- Original run: July 18, 2011 – September 19, 2011
- Episodes: 10

IS – Otoko Demo Onna Demo Nai Sei (IS～男でも女でもない性～; lit. 'IS – The Gender That Is Neither Male nor Female') is a Japanese manga series written and illustrated by Chiyo Rokuhana. It originated as a one-shot published in Kodansha's josei manga magazine One More Kiss in 2003, before becoming a full series serialized in Kiss from 2004 to 2009; the series' chapters were collected into seventeen volumes. The story follows the pain and troubles intersex people go through in their lives, such as gaining acceptance for who they are and their inability to reproduce.

== Plot ==
The first volume of IS is a collection of stories about two different intersex characters, Hiromi and Ryoma, and their separate troubles. Volumes two and onward deal with the life of the intersex character Haru Hoshino, starting just before their birth and continuing past high school.

== Characters ==
Hiromi (ヒロミ)
Hiromi was raised as a girl, and works as an office lady. She is the focus of the first part of the first volume. Hiromi is intersex, but desires to live with a "normal body" as a woman.
Ryoma (竜馬, Ryōma)
Ryoma was raised as a boy, but later in the story changes her gender to female. She is the focus of the second part of the first volume. At the beginning of the story, Ryoma is a teenager.
Haru Hoshino (星野春, Hoshino Haru)
Haru Hoshino was born with both testicles and ovaries, but did not undergo sex reassignment surgery during infancy to make them look more like one gender than the other. At 10 months old, they had to have their testicles removed due to a medical condition. From preschool through middle school, they always played with the boys their age in school, and was raised as a boy because of that. However, in high school, because they were registered as female on their birth certificate, they are forced to live as a female for three years. Their situation is complicated more because their body is maturing in a more feminine way, such as developing breasts and menstruating, despite their wish to live as a boy. During their story, they face struggles such as bullying and trying to accept their body for what it is, as well as making friends and falling in love.

== Production ==
In middle school, Rokuhana read a fantasy novel that had a character transition from a man to a woman, which led to an interest in writing a story with a protagonist similar to that character. Rokuhana's editor emphasized that it was a delicate issue, but allowed her to write a story based on that theme. Rokuhana researched the topic by reading medical books and interviewing doctors. She also met with intersex people and recalled being surprised by how kind and open they were about their situations. Following these interactions, Rokuhana made sure not to give readers the impression that intersex people are pitiable.

== Themes and analysis ==
IS – Otoko Demo Onna Demo Nai Sei emphasizes the complexity of each character's situation. In particular, it portrays intersexuality as an opportunity to reflect on social norms rather than a disease that needs to be cured. The manga depicts Haru throughout as gender neutral and emphasizes that external elements, like their school uniform, characterize Haru as male of female from the perspective of the other characters.

Unlike previous depictions of gender identity from the Year 24 Group, which were set in imaginary settings, IS – Otoko Demo Onna Demo Nai Sei is set in a realistic contemporary Japan. Rebecca Suter wrote that the manga uses common characteristics of shōjo manga, such as emotive backgrounds, scattered page layout, and focus on subjective details, to communicate visually its positive vision of gender ambivalence. Suter also wrote that this approach matches the common approach to identity politics seen in shōjo and josei manga, where ambiguity is celebrated through an unrealistic style.

== Media ==
=== Manga ===
Written and illustrated by Chiyo Rokuhana, the series originated as a one-shot published in Kodansha's josei manga magazine One More Kiss in 2003. The one-shot was turned into a full series that was serialized in Kiss from 2004 to 2009. Its individual chapters were collected into seventeen tankōbon volumes.

=== Television drama ===
The manga was adapted into a Japanese television drama directed by Takashi Fujio and produced by Junpei Nakagawa, Noboru Morita, and Daisaku Yamada, with Toshio Terada and Masako Iwamura writing the scripts and Megumi Shiraishi composing the music. Hilcrhyme performed the drama's ending theme "Personal Color". The drama was broadcast on TV Tokyo between July 18 and September 19, 2011, for ten episodes. It starred Saki Fukuda as Haru Hoshino and Ayame Gōriki as Miwako Aihara, a girl that became a close friend of Haru. On November 25, 2011, the episodes were released in a DVD box set.

== Reception ==
The manga won the 31st Kodansha Manga Award in 2007 in the shōjo manga category. Manga critic Shaenon K. Garrity highlighted the manga as one of the first to contain realistic depictions of gender identity.
