= 2014 Japanese television dramas =

←2013 - 2014 - 2015→

This is a list of Japanese television dramas shown within Japan during the year of 2014.

== Winter ==
Title (Japanese title)	Cast	Broadcast period	Episodes	Network	Notes	Ref
Gochisōsan (ごちそうさん)	Anne Watanabe	30/9/2013- 29/3/2014	150	NHK		
