= Vampire Heaven =

- DVD cover
- Genre: Romantic comedy
- Written by: Natsuki Seta; Yuna Suzuki
- Directed by: Natsuki Seta; You Kawahara
- Starring: Aya Ōmasa; Tsubasa Honda; Yūta Hiraoka
- Opening theme: "Kindan no Karma" (禁断のカルマ) by Shiritsu Ebisu Chūgaku
- Ending theme: "Bloody Night" by Chōtokkyū
- Country of origin: Japan
- Original language: Japanese
- No. of episodes: 12

Production
- Producers: Sayaka Iezumi; Juri Takahashi; Hisao Yaguchi; You Kawahara
- Production location: Japan

Original release
- Network: TV Tokyo
- Release: 12 April – 5 July 2013

Vampire Heaven (ヴァンパイア・ヘヴン) is a Japanese television drama series that aired on TV Tokyo from 12 April 2013 to 5 July 2013.

== Cast ==
- Aya Ōmasa as Sakurako, a 170-year-old vampire and Komachi's friend
- Tsubasa Honda as Komachi, a 165-year-old vampire
- Yūta Hiraoka as Hayato, a young man aspiring musician
- Satoshi Tomiura as Kentarō
- Anri Okamoto as Risa
- Touko Miura as Chisato
- Haruka Kurosawa as Mizuho
- Noriko Eguchi as Aoi
- Eisuke Sasai as Hakushaku, a vampire count over 300 years old
- Hidekazu Nagae as Genjūro
- Asaya Kimijima as Tobē

== See also ==
- List of vampire television series

| Preceded by Mierino Kashiwagi (January 2013 - March 2013) | TV Tokyo Friday Drama; Fridays 24:52 - 25:23 (JST) | Succeeded by Taberudake (July 2013 - September 2013) |
