= Teen Court: 10-dai Saiban =

- Genre: Legal, Teenage
- Directed by: Shintaro Sugawara, Maki Nishino
- Starring: Ayame Goriki, Kōji Seto
- Country of origin: Japan
- Original language: Japanese
- No. of seasons: 1
- No. of episodes: 11

Production
- Executive producer: Yoshiki Tanaka
- Producers: Tetsuya Ono, Mika Ohmori
- Running time: 31 minutes

Original release
- Network: NTV
- Release: January 10 – March 20, 2012

Teen Court: 10-dai Saiban (ティーンコート～10代裁判～) is a 2012 Japanese television drama series. This television series is inspired by the teen court justice system found in the United States. Teen courts allows teenagers who commit minor offenses to be tried by other teenagers, and they follow the concept of restorative justice.

== Cast ==
- Ayame Goriki as Misato Nyakouji
- Kōji Seto as Saburo Takada
- Eri Murakawa
- Ren Mori
- Hiroki Konno
- Kensuke Owada
- Azuma Mikihisa
- Maeda Beverly

== Episodes ==
	Episode title	Romanized title	Translation of title	Broadcast date	Ratings
Ep. 1	女子高生検事が犯罪を暴く! 10代裁判開廷!!	Mesukōsei kenji ga hanzai o abaku! 10-Dai saiban kaitei! !	The revelation of the reason why a high school girl committed a crime! Teen court trial starts now!!	January 10, 2012	2.5%
Ep. 2	窃盗犯の狙いは毒物 奇想天外な論告求刑	Settō-han no nerai wa dokubutsu kisōtengaina ronkoku kyūkei	The aim of the thieves is to poison. A totally unexpected criminal charge	January 17, 2012	3.3%
Ep. 3	女子高生痴漢裁判	Mesukōsei chikan saiban	The schoolgirl molestation case	January 24, 2012	3.4%
Ep. 4	痴漢犯は白か黒か	Chikan-han wa shiro ka kuro ka	Is the alleged molester guilty or not?	January 31, 2012	3.5%
Ep. 5	対決! 天才弁護士	Taiketsu! Tensai bengoshi	A showdown between two genius lawyers!	February 7, 2012	3.1%
Ep. 6	悪い奴ほどよく語る!	Warui Yatsu hodo yoku kataru!	Talking bad about someone	February 14, 2012	2.9%
Ep. 7	いじめを暴く15の証言	Ijime o abaku 15 no shōgen	The 15 testimonies to uncover the real bully	February 21, 2012	4.8%
Ep. 8	熱血教師の秘め事	Nekketsu kyōshi no himegoto	The secret of an enthusiastic teacher	February 28, 2012	3.5%
Ep. 9	ライオン男の雄叫び!?	Raion otoko no otakebi! ?	The roar of a lion-man!?	March 6, 2012	3.1%
Ep. 10	20の連続万引き事件	20 no renzoku manbiki jiken	The 20 consecutive shoplifting incidents	March 13, 2012	3.7%
Ep. 11	求刑は愛の告白!?	2Kyūkei wa ai no kokuhaku! ?	A love confession from the prosecutor!?	March 20, 2012	3.1%
Ratings for Kantō region (average rating: 3.4%)
