= Massan =

- Promotional poster
- Genre: Drama
- Written by: Daisuke Habara
- Directed by: Yūsuke Noda; Toki Kajiwara
- Starring: Tetsuji Tamayama; Charlotte Kate Fox; Saki Aibu; Norito Yashima; Mari Hamada; Naomi Nishida; Kiyoshi Nishikawa; Morio Kazama; Gin Maeda; Pinko Izumi; Shinichi Tsutsumi
- Narrated by: Yōko Matsuoka
- Opening theme: "Mugi no Uta" by Miyuki Nakajima
- Country of origin: Japan
- Original language: Japanese
- No. of episodes: 150

Production
- Executive producer: Ken Sakurai
- Producer: Akihisa Yamamoto
- Production location: Japan
- Running time: 15 minutes
- Production company: NHK Osaka

Original release
- Network: NHK
- Release: September 29, 2014 – March 28, 2015

Massan (Japanese: マッサン) is a Japanese television drama series, the 91st asadora (morning drama), broadcast daily on NHK from September 29, 2014, until March 28, 2015. It dramatizes the life of Masataka Taketsuru (played by Tetsuji Tamayama), the founder of the Nikka Whisky Distilling company. Charlotte Kate Fox plays his wife, Ellie Kameyama, based on the Scottish businesswoman Rita Taketsuru. Massan was the first NHK asadora series to feature a non-Japanese actor in a lead role.

== Plot ==
=== Osaka chapter (1st week - 15th week) ===
When Masaharu Kameyama returns to his hometown Takehara in Hiroshima prefecture after spending two years in Scotland learning how to make whisky, he brings back with him Ellie, a woman whom he met and married there. His parents are shocked to see this blonde woman arrive as their new daughter in law. Masaharu's mother, Sanae, in particular refuses to accept the marriage. But Masashi, his father, is more forgiving, even encouraging his son to pursue his dream of making real whisky in Japan, despite the fact the family has run a sake brewery for generations.

Masaharu takes Ellie and returns to his job at the Sumiyoshi Brewery in Osaka, but encounters another problem: Daisaku Tanaka, the head of the brewery, paid for Masaharu to go to Scotland on the expectation that he would later marry his daughter, Yūko. She initially resents Ellie, but they become friends and Yūko teaches Ellie how to cook Japanese food.

Meanwhile, Masaharu tries to put together a plan so that Sumiyoshi can begin making whisky, but that is put in danger when a nationwide scandal over poorly made wine hurts Sumiyoshi's wine business, even though there is no problem with their product. The flamboyant president of Kamoi Trading, Kinjirō Kamoi, seems to save the day with a revolutionary advertising campaign promoting wine, but that is not enough for the Sumiyoshi board of directors. They cancel Masaharu's whisky plan and push him out of the company.

Too proud to go ask Kamoi for a job, after having once rejected an offer from him, Masaharu does odd jobs while Ellie begins teaching English and singing, earning quite a reputation in the neighborhood. When Masaharu receives a telegram from his mother saying that his father is dying, they rush back to Takehara only to find that it is a ruse: Sanae is plotting to have Masaharu give up his dreams of whisky and take over the sake business from his father. After seeing his sister giving birth, and wondering if he can support Ellie once they have a child, Masaharu proposes to stay in Hiroshima and take over the sake business, but his father insists he should follow his dreams.

After the two return to Osaka, Masaharu thinks about asking Kamoi for a job, but gets offended by what he thinks is his lack of serious dedication towards whisky. Ellie devises a number of plans to bring the two together, but in the end it is when Masaharu realizes how devoted Kamoi is to making whisky in Japan that he joins Kamoi's business. Toshio, who worked at Masashi's sake brewery, comes to help.

But even then, it seems that Kamoi and Masaharu are of two minds. Masaharu insists that only Hokkaido has the right conditions to make good whisky, but Kamoi insists on building the distillery in Yamazaki near Osaka. Kamoi has good reasons for building it there, so after several years' construction, the distillery begins operations. It is at that time that Masaharu learns that Ellie is pregnant. He also begins boarding Eiichirō Kamoi, Kinjirō's son who resents his father for what he thinks he did to his mother. Ellie miscarries and finds out that becoming pregnant again might threaten her life. Seeing this human drama, Eiichirō reconciles with his father and decides to learn whisky making from Masaharu.

Ellie and Masaharu adopt a baby girl named Emma. Whisky brewing proceeds well, but unfortunately their first batches do not sell well, threatening the entire Kamoi business. Masaharu insists on only making a true scotch whisky with "smokey flavor," so Kamoi, to make him understand the problem of sales, sends him out into the countryside to sell the product.

=== Hokkaidō chapter (16th week - 25th week) ===
In Yoichi, Hokkaido, Masaharu runs into Kumatora Morino, a former samurai who made a fortune in the herring fishing business, who buys all his whisky to help him out. In Yoichi, Masaharu finds the ideal location for making whisky. It is that time that Sanae dies, after telling Ellie how wonderful a daughter-in-law she is. Realizing his responsibility in raising a family, Masaharu returns to Osaka and accepts Kamoi's plan to produce lower-grade whisky more appealing to Japanese, to the protestations of Toshio and Eiichirō. He does that, but with Ellie's prompting, quits Kamoi's company and, with the help of investors, proceeds to Hokkaido to start his own brewery.

Masaharu's plan is to take advantage of Yoichi's abundant apple orchards to make apple juice until the whisky ages. But when people find out he is staying at Kumatora's, they all refuse to talk to him. Apparently Kumatora's business had gone bust and he was deeply in debt, earning the resentment of everyone, including his son Kazuma. Masaharu solves the situation by buying Kumatora's "herring mansion" (鰊御殿, nishin goten), who pays off his debts. Masaharu builds his own house next to the mansion and Kazuma and Hana, Kumatora's daughter, help with the new business. Toshio again arrives to help out.

The apple juice business takes a while to take hold and Emma runs into problems at school because kids tease her for having a caucasian mother. It is only then that she finds out she is adopted. Hearing of Eiichirō's untimely death, Masaharu also starts brewing whisky before his investors allow him, and when it is done, it also does not sell well. In the meantime, Toshio marries Hana. Masaharu's business is saved, as Japan heads towards war, by the Imperial Japanese Navy, which wants to secure a supply of domestic whisky.

Now operating as a designated supplier of the Navy, Masaharu's finances are finally stable, but after the bombing of Pearl Harbor, Ellie is confronted with a major decision. Catherine, the Japanese wife of a British missionary and an old friend from Osaka, urges Ellie to leave the country with her, but Ellie decides to stay. During the war, however, she is almost arrested by the Kenpeitai under the false charge of being a spy, and Emma is bullied at school. Emma also falls in love with Kazuma, whom Masaharu hopes to groom as his successor, but has to bear it when he is drafted and is sent off to war. She and everyone else is shocked when news arrives of his death just before the end of the war.

When the war ends, Ellie is finally able to leave the house for the first time in years, but Masaharu's whisky again does not sell, especially since third-grade whisky has taken over the market. Satoru, the second son of Masaharu's sister Chikako, arrives in Yoichi after several years of imprisonment in Siberia. It is he who convinces Masaharu that a good third-grade whisky is just what the average Japanese needs after the war. Masaharu, using whisky made with the special strain of wheat Kazuma developed just for whisky, succeeds in making a third-grade whisky without any additives or coloring, which sells well. Toshio then leaves for Hiroshima with Hana to help Masashi with the sake brewery. Seeing Satoru's interest in whisky making, Ellie and Masaharu decide to adopt him.

Several years later, Satoru is married with children and Emma returns from her job in England with a young man in tow. As Ellie and Masaharu interrogate her on whether she will marry him or not, Ellie collapses. It turns out Ellie does not have long to live. Masaharu hopes to give Ellie the wedding ceremony he never gave her—and Emma promises to marry her beau Mike—but Ellie dies. Ten years later, Masaharu produces an award-winning whisky named after Ellie.

== Casting ==
Fox was chosen from among 521 applicants (232 from Japan, 289 from outside Japan). Fox appeared in all 150 episodes of Massan. Her performance was entirely in Japanese, with the exception of occasional scenes spoken in English, such as retrospective scenes in the character's home in Scotland, which were filmed in Japan in locations such as Hokkaido. Fox had no experience in the Japanese language nor had she visited Japan prior to travelling there to perform her screen test. Each line of Fox's script included three additional lines, the first of which was the Romanized script of the Japanese line, followed by the translated line in English, and finally by the word-for-word literal translation in English which follows the Japanese word order. This way Fox would not only learn the Japanese lines but also acknowledge where each word would occur in a given line, thus acting according to the Japanese word order whether the lines were uttered by her or by her co-performers. This made Fox's script ten times longer than the other actors'. "If I had been in Charlotte's position, I would have run away to America," said Tamayama.

== Reception ==
The final episode of Massan aired on March 28, 2015. The show recorded the mean audience ratings of 21.1% through its run, ranking third-highest of the previous 20 asadora series. When polled by NHK, 60% of viewers chose Fox as the reason for watching Massan, second to the "interesting story and theme" at 65%.

== Cast ==
- Masaharu Kameyama (亀山 政春, Kameyama Masaharu): Tetsuji Tamayama
- Elizabeth "Ellie" Kameyama (亀山 エリー, Kameyama Erī): Charlotte Kate Fox
- Emma Kameyama (亀山 エマ, Kameyama Ema): Mio Yūki (ages 15–18); Haruka Kinami (adult)
- Sanae Kameyama (亀山 早苗, Kameyama Sanae): Pinko Izumi
- Masashi Kameyama (亀山 政志, Kameyama Masashi): Gin Maeda
- Sachiko Okazaki (岡崎 千加子, Okazaki Sachiko): Naomi Nishida
- Satoru Okazaki (岡崎 悟, Okazaki Satoru): Yūki Izumisawa
- Sumire Kameyama (亀山 すみれ, Kameyama Sumire): Akari Hayami
- Toshio Yazawa (八澤俊夫, Yazawa Toshio): Norito Yashima
- Shimajii the Clerk (番頭・島爺, Bantō Shimajii): Gentarō Takahashi
- Sumiyoshi Brewery President Daisaku Tanaka (住吉酒造社長・田中大作, Sumiyoshi Shuzō Shachō Tanaka Daisaku): Kiyoshi Nishikawa
- Yūko Tanaka (田中 優子, Tanaka Yūko): Saki Aibu
- Kayo Tanaka (田中 佳代, Tanaka Kayo): Yōko Natsuki
- Sumiyoshi Brewery Manager Yaguchi (住吉酒造専務・矢口, Sumiyoshi Shuzō Senmu Yaguchi): Akira Shirai
- Sumiyoshi Brewery Office Worker Yoshiko (住吉酒造事務員・好子, Sumiyoshi Shūzo Jimuin Yoshiko): Noriko Eguchi
- Catherine (Taneko) (キャサリン（種子）, Kyasarin (Taneko)): Mari Hamada
- Cafeteria "Kohinobori" Shopkeeper Haru-san (食堂「こひのぼり」店主・春さん, Shokudō "Koinobori" Tenshu Haru-san): Izō Oikawa
- Kinjirō Kamoi (鴨居 欣次郎, Kamoi Kinjirō): Shinichi Tsutsumi
- Eiichirō Kamoi (鴨居 英一郎, Kamoi Eiichirō): Kodai Asaka
- The Constable (巡査, Junsa): Akihiro Kimura
- Kumatora Morino (森野熊虎, Morino Kumatora): Morio Kazama
- Hana Morino (森野ハナ, Morino Hana): Eiko Koike
- Kazuma Morino (森野一馬, Morino Kazuma): Arata Horita
- Susumu Nishida (西田進, Nishida Susumu): Yukijirō Hotaru
- Wullie, Scottish distillery foreman (ローレンス マックラウド・マドックス): Laurence McLeod Maddox
- Mr. Smith, Scottish distiller visiting Japan （ヘンリー ファウラー）: Henry Fowler

Preceded by Hanako to Anne	Asadora; September 29, 2014 – March 28, 2015	Succeeded by Mare
