= Hayami-san to Yobareru Hi =

- Poster
- Genre: Drama
- Starring: Nao Matsushita; Yoshihiko Inohara
- Country of origin: Japan
- Original language: Japanese
- No. of seasons: 1

Production
- Camera setup: Multi-camera
- Running time: 54 minutes
- Production company: Fuji TV

Original release
- Network: Fuji TV
- Release: January 15 – March 18, 2012

Hayami-san to Yobareru Hi (早海さんと呼ばれる日; 'The Days I Was Called Hayami-San') is a Japanese television series which premiered on Fuji TV on 15 January 2012.

== Cast ==
- Nao Matsushita as Yuriko Hayami
- Yoshihiko Inohara as Kyoichi Hayami
- Yuichi Nakamaru as Kaoru Hayami
- Jun Kaname as Kenji Hayami
- Yuki Morinaga as Yuzo Hayami
- Eiichiro Funakoshi as Keitarou Hayami
- Yuko Kotegawa as Yoko Hayami
- Takeo Nakahara as Hiroshi Kanai
- Kazuko Kato as Michiko Kanai
- Kenjiro Nashimoto as Shigeo Muto
- Tetsu Watanabe as Genzo Ishida
- Taizo Harada as Aki Irie

=== Guests ===
- Hijiri Sakurai (ep.3-4)
- Goki Maeda (ep.4)
- Toshifumi Muramatsu as Satoshi Miyake (ep.4-5)
- Takashi Yamanaka as Kohei Inada (ep.6)
- Issei Takahashi as Akihiko Toritani (ep.8-9)
- Hiroyuki Onoue as Seiji Shiina (ep.9-10)
