= Resident: Story of 5 Interns =

- Resident - 5-nin no Kenshui
- Starring: Riisa Naka; Kento Hayashi; Takahisa Masuda; Aya Omasa; Anna Ishibashi; Yukiyoshi Ozawa; Arata Furuta; Risa Sudo
- Composer: Yugo Kanno
- Country of origin: Japan
- Original language: Japanese

Original release
- Network: TBS
- Release: October 2012 – December 2012

Resident: Story of 5 Interns (レジデント～5人の研修医, Resident - 5-nin no Kenshui) is a 2012 Japanese television drama series.

== Cast ==
- Riisa Naka as Shizuku Miyama
- Kento Hayashi as Yazawa Kei
- Takahisa Masuda as Manaka Junichi
- Aya Omasa as Hinako Koiwai
- Anna Ishibashi as Sachi Shinjo
- Yukiyoshi Ozawa as Kazuki Miyajima
- Arata Furuta as Ikuo Tabuchi
- Risa Sudo as Yayoi Kasumi
