= Ayame Goriki =

Japanese actress (born 1992)

- 剛力 彩芽
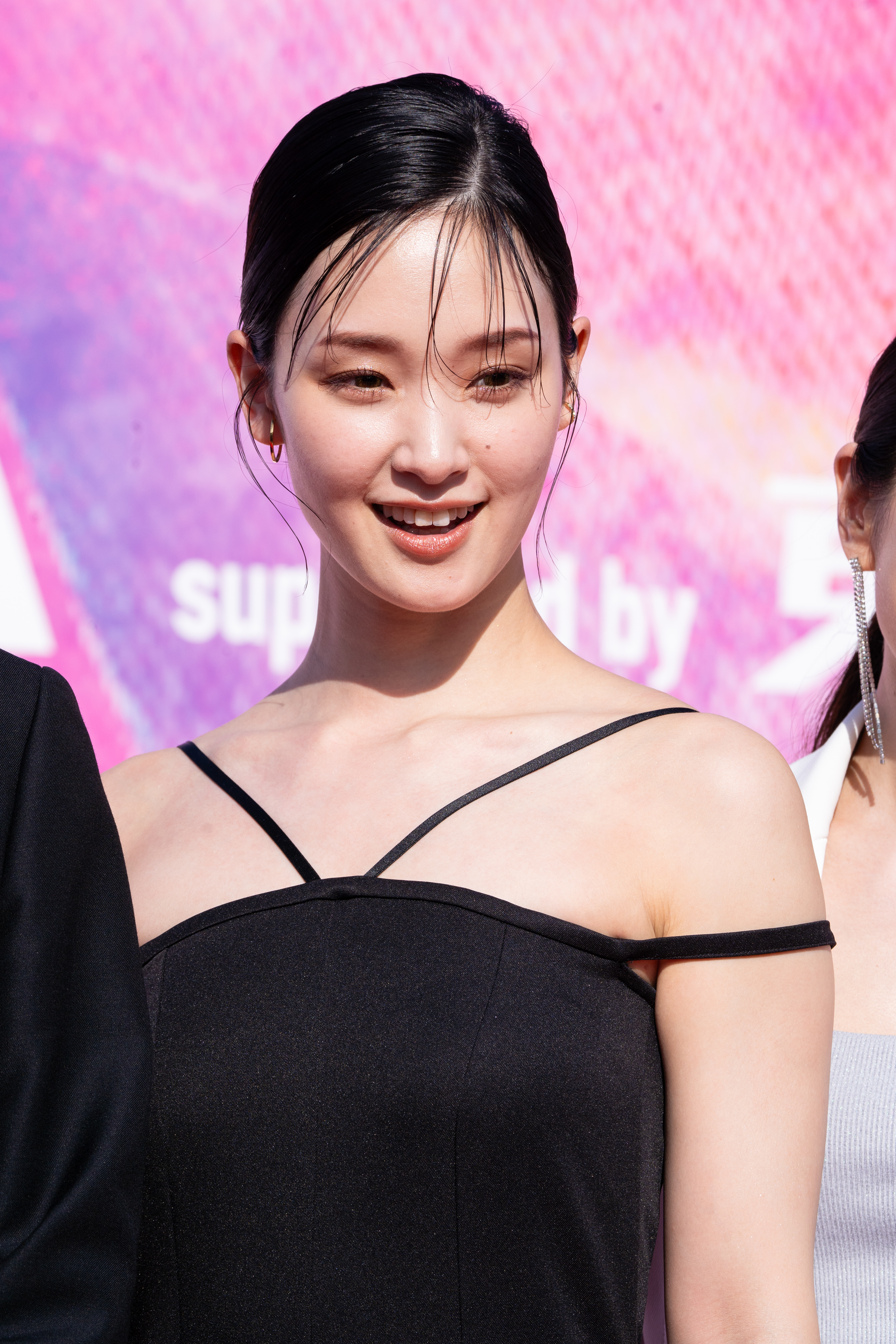
- Goriki at the Yokohama International Film Festival in 2024
- Born: 27 August 1992 (age 34); Hodogaya-ku, Yokohama, Kanagawa Prefecture, Japan
- Occupations: Actress; model; singer; television presenter
- Years active: 2002–present
- Agent: Shortcut
- Notable work: The Case Files of Biblia Bookstore as Shioriko Shinokawa
- Height: 162 cm (5 ft 4 in)
- Website: www.ayamegoriki.com

Ayame Goriki (剛力 彩芽, Gōriki Ayame; born 27 August 1992) is a Japanese actress. She was represented by the talent agency Oscar Promotion until 2020. Currently she was represented by the talent agency Short Cut.

== Early life and career ==
=== Biography ===
Goriki was born on 27 August 1992 in Hodogaya-ku, Yokohama, Kanagawa Prefecture.

=== Career beginnings ===
Ayame Goriki liked to stand out when she was young. When she was in elementary school, she told her parents that she wanted to become a model. At the age of 7 she had a professional photographer take a snapshot at an amusement park, for a magazine, which lead her to becoming a model. Goriki also participated in the 8th Japan Beautiful Girl Contest in 2002, but did not progress past the second round. While at the event, she was recruited by the Japanese talent agency Oscar Promotion.

From February 2008 to May 2013, she worked as an exclusive model for the fashion magazine Seventeen.

In January 2011, she appeared on the Fuji TV monthly drama Taisetsu na Koto wa Subete Kimi ga Oshiete Kureta. To play the role, she changed her appearance noticeably by growing her hair long. In some profiles, Taisetsu na Koto wa Subete Kimi ga Oshiete Kureta is listed as her debut work. However, her official debut work is ChocoMimi (TV Tokyo), premiering in 2007. In July of the same year, she starred in a TV drama "Cosmic Star" for TV Tokyo's IS.

Since then, she has appeared in commercials for Mister Donut, Sekisui House, and Lunch Pack (Yamazaki Baking). In November 2011, Nikkei Trendy selected her as "Face of the Year".

Goriki starred in a TV drama for the first time, appearing on The Case Files of Biblia Bookstore (Fuji TV), which started on January 14, 2013.

In 2016, she performed live for the first time in the Meiji-za November performance of Sisters of the Gion.

=== Voice acting ===
In 2012, she voiced Elizabeth Shaw in the movie Prometheus. In 2014, she also voiced Mystique in X-Men: Days of Future Past.

=== Music debut ===
In February 2013, she debuted as a singer in June 2013 with the song "Tomodachi Yori Daiji na Hito" (友達より大事な人; lit. "More Than a Friend"). Prior to the release of the CD on July 10, it was used as a Yamazaki Baking Lunch Pack CM song.

== Filmography ==
=== Films ===
Year	Title	Role	Notes	Ref.
2010	Gekijo-ban: Kaidan Restaurant	Jun Takase		
2010	Fireworks From the Heart	Hiromi Hayase		
2012	Quartet!	Misaki Nagae		
2013	Gatchaman	Jun Ōtsuki		
2013	The Kiyosu Conference	Matsuhime		
2014	Black Butler	Shiori Genpō (Kiyoharu)		
2014	L DK	Aoi Nishimori	Lead role	
2021	End-of-Life Concierge	Aya Ohara		
2021	Dekotora no Shu 6			
2022	Tears of Persephone		Lead role	
2023	Detective of Joshidaikoji		Lead role	
2024	The Ohara Family Rhapsody	Aya Ohara		
2025	Yukiko a.k.a	Marika Koga		
2025	Seaside Serendipity	Risako		
2025	Mission: Sorta Possible	Misato Haneda		
2025	Good Luck			
2026	Goodbye, My Loved Ones!	Aya Ohara		

=== Television dramas ===
Year	Title	Role	Notes	Ref(s)
2007–08	ChocoMimi	Bambi		
2007–09	Torihada		TV movie	
2008	Battery	Ai Asakura		
2008–09	Love Letter	Yoko Ochi (teen)		
2009	Samayoi Zakura	Hamachiyo Anri (defence witness)	TV movie	
2009	Ghost Town no Hana		TV movie	
2011	Taisetsu na Koto wa Subete Kimi ga Oshiete Kureta	Nozomi Sonoda		
2011	Koi Suru Nihongo	Nanaka		
2011	Tōi Hi no Yukue	Reika Miyawaki		
2011	Asukō March: Asuka Kōgyō Kōkō Monogatari	Momo Aizawa		
2011	IS – Otoko Demo Onna Demo Nai Sei	Miwako Aihara		
2011	The Reason I Can't Find My Love	Momoko Hanzawa	Episode 2–4, 7, 9, and 10	
2012	Teen Court: 10-dai Saiban	Misato Niyakouji		
2012	Hissatsu Shigotonin	Oharu		
2012	Murder at Mt. Fuji	Sayaka Mido		
2012	Mirai Nikki - Another: World	Yuno Furusaki		
2012	Beginners	Hiro Momoe		
2012	Irodori Himura	Yui	Episode 1	
2012	True Horror Stories: Summer 2012	Airi Sano	Lead role; single-episode drama	
2013	Yae's Sakura	Yuki Hinata (Yuki Naitō)	Taiga drama	
2013	The Case Files of Biblia Bookstore	Shioriko Shinokawa		
2013	Kurokōchi	Mayo Seike		
2014	Watashi no Kirai na Tantei	Akemi Ninomiya		
2014	Asunaro San San Nana Byōshi	Saya Matsushita		
2014	Kindaichi Kōsuke vs Akechi Kogorō Futatabi	Hoshiko Ryūjō		
2014	Legal High Special			
2014	True Horror Stories: 15th-year Anniversary Special	Rina Sasaoka	Lead role; single-episode drama	
2015	Taishi Kakka no Ryōrinin	Ray Tee Lan		
2015	Kuroi Gashū	Ai Numada		
2024	The Queen of Villains	Lioness Asuka	web series	

=== Anime ===
- Pretty Cure All Stars New Stage 3: Eternal Friends (2014), Nami

=== Video games ===
- Rhythm Thief & the Emperor’s Treasure (2012), Marie/Maria

=== Dubbing ===
- Prometheus (2012), Elizabeth Shaw (Noomi Rapace)
- X-Men: Days of Future Past, Raven Darkhölme / Mystique (Jennifer Lawrence)

=== Radio shows ===
- Ayame Gouriki Smile Smile! (Nippon Broadcasting System, 2012), host
- Girls Locks! (Tokyo FM, 2012–2015)

=== Music video appearances ===
- KARUTETTO - Best Friend (2009)

== Stage ==
- No. 9 ~ Immortal Melody ~ as Maria Stein (2018-2021, 2024-2025)

== Discography ==
=== Singles ===
Title	Release Date	Peak chart positions	
Title	Release Date	Oricon	Japan Hot 100
"Tomodachi Yori Daiji na Hito" (友達より大事な人; lit. "More Than a Friend")	July 10, 2013	7	6
"Anata no Hyaku no Kirai na Tokoro" (あなたの100の嫌いなところ; lit. "100 Things I Hate About You")	February 26, 2014	12	17
"Kuyashii Kedo Daiji na Hito" (くやしいけど大事な人; lit. "It Hurts, But You're Important to Me")	October 29, 2014	8	19
"Ai Agasa" (相合傘; lit. "Love Umbrella")	September 2, 2015		
"?" denotes releases that did not chart or were not released in that region. "×" denotes periods where charts did not exist or were not archived.

== Bibliography ==
=== Magazines ===
- Seventeen, Shueisha 1967-, as an exclusive model from 2008 to 2013

=== Photobooks ===
- Shizuku (Shueisha, 25 November 2011) ISBN 9784087806328
- Ayame Gouriki (Wani Books, 26 August 2012) ISBN 9784847044915
- Yoaki no Spica: Spica at Day Break (Wani Books, 27 June 2014) ISBN 9784847046612

== Awards ==
=== 2011 ===
- The Best of Beauty 2011
- Nikkei Trendy Face of the Year
- The 2nd Japan Wedding Best Dresser Awards

=== 2012 ===
- The 21st Japanese Film Critics Awards Best Newcomer
- The 25th Japan Glasses Best Dresser: Special Award
- The 34th Kodansha Advertisement Award: Best Character Award
- The 12th Best Leathernist Awards
- Best Smile of the Year 2012 Celebrity Category
- Vogue Japan Women of the Year 2012
- The 41st Best Dresser Awards Entertainment Category
- Best Beautist Award 2012 Actress Category

=== 2013 ===
- The 24th Japan Jewelry Best Dresser Awards: 20s Category
- The 18th Japan Association of Adult Orthodontics - E-Line Beautiful Award
- The 30th Asakusa Geinō Awards Best Newcomer

=== 2014 ===
- The 10th Best Cool Biz Awards
