= Tetsuji Tamayama =

Japanese actor (born 1980)

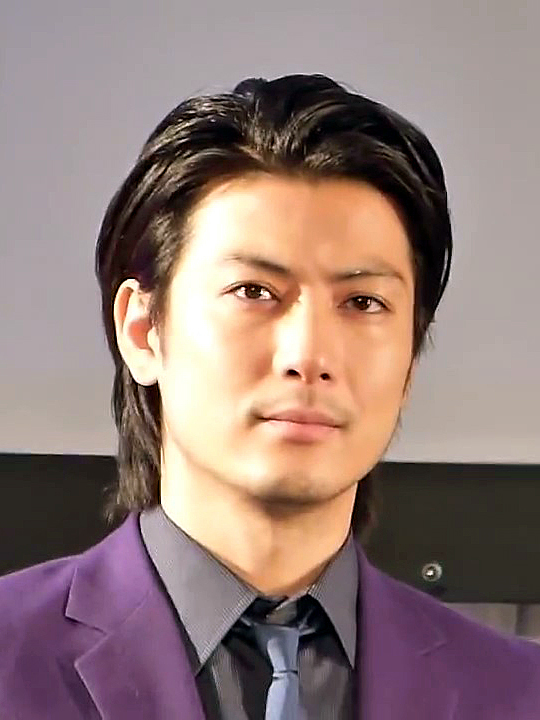
- November 2012 in Tokyo
- Born: Tetsuji Tamayama; April 7, 1980 (age 46); Kyoto, Kyoto, Japan
- Occupations: Actor; model
- Years active: 1999–present

Tetsuji Tamayama (玉山 鉄二, Tamayama Tetsuji; born April 7, 1980) is a Japanese TV, film actor and model. He joined modeling competitions and was active in Checkmate and other fashion magazines. In 2001, Tamayama debuted in Hyakujuu Sentai Gaoranger as Tsukumaro Ogami/GaoSilver. He continued to star in more movies and TV dramas such as Casshern, Tokyo Love Cinema, and Rockers.

== Filmography ==
=== Movies ===
- Once Hit the Bottom (2022), Kōki Tachibana
- Daisuke Jigen (2023), Daisuke Jigen
- Tokyo MER: Mobile Emergency Room – Nankai Mission (2025), Shin Mugio
- Mystery Arena (2026), Legend

=== TV dramas ===
- Part-Time Detective (2002) as Shuji Ichinose
- Tenchijin (2009), Uesugi Kagetora
- Massan (2014), Masaharu Kameyama
- Segodon (2018), Kido Takayoshi
- What Will You Do, Ieyasu? (2023), Ōno Harunaga
- Laughing Matryoshka (2024), Toshiya Suzuki
- Water Margin (2026), Li Fu

== Awards and nominations ==
Year	Award ceremony	Category	Result	Ref.
2016	40th Elan d'or Awards	Newcomers of the Year	Won	
