= The Case Files of Biblia Bookstore (TV series) =

- Also known as: The Case Records of the Biblia Secondhand Bookstore
- Genre: Romance; Mystery
- Created by: En Minami
- Directed by: Matsuyama Hiroaki; Miyaki Shogo
- Starring: Ayame Goriki; Akira
- Opening theme: The Never Ending Story by E-Girls
- Country of origin: Japan
- Original language: Japanese
- No. of episodes: 11

Production
- Producers: Obara Ichiryu; Fujino Ryota
- Production company: Fuji Television

Original release
- Network: FNS (Fuji TV)
- Release: January 14 – March 25, 2013

The Case Files of Biblia Bookstore (ビブリア古書堂の事件手帖, Biburia Koshodō no Jiken Techō; lit. 'Antiquarian Bookshop Biblia Case Files') is a Japanese television drama that aired on Fuji Television Monday nights at 9 pm from January 14 to March 25, 2013. It is based on a light novel series by En Mikami. The story revolves around a young woman who owns a used bookshop, who becomes involved in various mysteries concerning the books she sells.

== Synopsis ==
This story takes place at an antiquarian bookshop on a secluded corner of Kamakura, Japan's ancient capital, called Biblia Antiquarian Bookshop. The owner of the shop is Shioriko Shinokawa, a young and beautiful woman who is extremely shy and finds it difficult to converse upon meeting someone for the first time. The abundance of her knowledge in antiquarian books is second to none. When she speaks about these classic books, passion overcomes shyness and she becomes the most eloquent storyteller.

== Cast ==
- Ayame Goriki as Shioriko Shinokawa
- Akira as Daisuke Goura
  - Ryu Hashizume as young Daisuke Goura (episode 1)
- Kei Tanaka as Kikuya Kasai
- Kosuke Suzuki as Akio Fujinami
- Hiromi Kitagawa as Natsumi Yokota
- Jesse Lewis as Fumiya Shinokawa
- Elina Mizuno as Nao Kosuga
- Reina Triendl as Aya Sasaki
- Risa Naito as Sayaka Hashimoto
- Narumi Yasuda as Chieko Shinokawa
- Keiko Matsuzaka as Eri Goura
- Katsumi Takahashi as Hajime Shida
