= Aya Ōmasa =

Japanese model and actress (born 1991)

- 大政 絢
- Born: February 4, 1991 (age 35); Takikawa, Hokkaido, Japan
- Occupations: Model; actress
- Years active: 2006–present
- Agent: Stardust Promotion
- Height: 1.64 m (5 ft 4 1/2 in)
- Spouse: Toru Yamashita (m. 2021)
- Children: 1

Aya Ōmasa (大政 絢, Ōmasa Aya; born February 4, 1991) is a Japanese model and actress.

== Career ==
Omasa co-starred with Shōta Sometani in Natsuki Seta's 2010 film A Liar and a Broken Girl. She appeared in the 2011 film Paradise Kiss.

== Personal life ==
On December 28, 2021, Ōmasa announced on her personal social media account that she had married Toru Yamashita, the guitarist of the rock band One Ok Rock. On January 9, 2025, she announced that the couple was expecting their first child. On May 7, of the same year, Ōmasa gave birth to her first child, a son.

== Filmography ==
=== Films ===
| Year | Title | Role |
|---|---|---|
| 2008 | Topless | Kana |
| 2008 | New Type: Just For Your Love | Tsugino Yuri |
| 2011 | A Liar and a Broken Girl | Misono Mayu |
| 2011 | Keitai Deka: The Movie 3 | Zenigata Kai |
| 2011 | Paradise Kiss | Sakurada Miwako |
| 2011 | Bokutachi no After School | Furukawa Maki |
| 2012 | Kuroneko Lucy | Nagisa Satonaka |
| 2014 | Kamen Teacher The Movie | Ichimura Miki |
| 2017 | Policeman and Me | Fumi Komori |
| 2017 | Cosmetic Wars | Akane Misawa |
| 2018 | Reon | Sarina Yamaguchi |
| 2018 | Perfect World | Miki Yukimura |

=== TV dramas ===
- Tokyo Girl Episode 6 "Tokyo Kashimashi Girls" (BS-i, 2006), Chiharu
- Isshō Wasurenai Monogatari Episode 2 "Million Films" (TV Asahi, 2006)
- Otona no Megane 11-gatsu "Mirai" (Chiba TV, 2006), Yūka Saionji
- Koi Suru Nichiyōbi: New Type (BS-TBS, 2006), Yuri Tsukino
  - Episode 10 "Hitori Bocchi no Majo"
  - Episode 12 "Majo no Christmas"
- Hana Yori Dango 2: Returns (TBS, 2007), Yuduki Morishita
- Koi Suru Nichiyōbi Season 3 (BS-TBS, 2007)
  - Episode 21 "Chikakute Tōi Koi", Rena Terasaki
  - Episode 26 "Shōwa Anime Daikōshin: Kimi ha Koi o Shinjireruka", Aya
- Keitai Deka Zenigatakai (BS-TBS, 2007), Kai Zenigata
- Sensei Dō (BS-TBS, 2007), Eri
- NEW TYPE: Tada, Ai no Tameni Episode 1 (TBS, 2008), Yuri Tsukino
- Sakura no Uta (BS-TBS, 2008), Aya
- Hachi-One Diver (Fuji TV, 2008), Ayumi Sugata
- Kaidan Shin Mimibukuro: Special Zekkyō-hen (BS-TBS, 2008)
  - Vol1: "Boon", Natsumi Imoto
  - Vol2: "Gee", Aki Matsushima
- Tokyo Girl (BS-TBS, 2008)
- Taiyo to Umi no Kyoshitsu (Fuji TV, 2008), Yukino Tsugihara
- Pocky 4 Sisters (BS-TBS, 2008), Aya Kidokoro
- Mei-chan no Shitsuji (Fuji TV, 2009), Rika Kayama
- Koi to Oshare to Otokonoko Episode 5 "Hare Tokidoki Ghost" (BS-TBS, 2009), Aya
- Buzzer Beat: Gakeppuchi no Hero (Fuji TV, 2009)
- Tantei X Karano Chōsenjō! Season 2, Episode 2 "Maison Casablanca" (NHK, 2009), Hatanaka
- Yamato Nadeshiko Shichi Henge (TBS, 2010), Sunako Nakahara
- Sandaime Akechi Kogorō: Kyō mo Akechi ga Korosareru Episode 3 (TBS, 2010), Hayakawa
- Misaki Number One! (NTV, 2011), Yui Sakurai
- Rokudenashi Blues (TBS, 2011), Chiaki Nanase
- Kaitō Royale (TBS, 2011), Karen Katagiri
- Strawberry Night Episode 2 and 3 "Migi Deha Naguranai" (Fuji TV, 2012), Miki Shimosaka
- Seinaru Kaibutsutachi (TV Asahi, 2012), Yōko Hirai
- Mikeneko Homes no Suiri (NTV, 2012), Harumi Katayama
- Kekkon Dōsōkai: Seaside Love (Fuji TV TWO, 2012), Mion Aiba
- Resident – 5-nin no Kenshui (TBS, 2012), Hinako Koiwai
- Vampire Heaven (TV Tokyo, 2013), Sakurako
- Sennyū Tantei Tokage Episode 3 (TBS, 2013), Mitsuki Nagata
- Yonimo Kimyona Monogatari: 2013 - Haru no Tokubetsu Hen "Kaidan no Hanako" (Fuji TV, 2013), Chisako Kotani
- Kamen Teacher (NTV, 2013), Ichimura Miki
- Yoru no Sensei (TBS, 2014), Runa Uena
- Nezumi, Edo wo hashiru Episode 5 (NHK, 2014), Osato(Guest)
- Suikyu Yankisu(Water Polo Yankees) (Fuji TV, 2014), Chiharu Aoyama
- Algernon ni Hanataba wo (TBS, 2015), Mai Koide
- Watashi Kekkon Dekinainjanakute, Shinaindesu (TBS, 2016), Rika Nomura
- Shizumanu Taiyō (Wowow, 2016)
- Showa Genroku Rakugo Shinju (NHK G, 2018), Miyokichi
- Mikazuki (NHK, 2019)
- Enjoy Drinking Alone (Wowow, 2021), Mei Benikawa
- The Scales of Justice (Seigi no Tenbin, 正義の天秤) (NHK, 2021) - Miyuki Kiryu
- Ideal Boyfriend (Girl's Dream) (2022), Yumeko Onodera
- The Scales of Justice Season 2 (Seigi no Tenbin Season 2, 正義の天秤Season2) (NHK, 2023) - Miyuki Kiryu

https://www.nhk.jp/p/ts/RM4PJL5QGN/

=== Web dramas ===
- Kimi ga Ireba: Beautiful Love (BeeTV, 4 June 2010), Hinata
- Paradise Kiss: After School (6 May 2011), Miwako Sakurada

=== Radio dramas ===
- Voice of 11PM (Nippon Broadcasting System)
  - Otona ni Narutte (From 13 October 2008 To 17 October 2008)
  - Teammate (From 5 January 2009 To 9 January 2009)
  - Sayonara Kaidan (From 9 March 2009 To 13 March 2009)

=== Music videos ===
- HAYABUSA - Miracle (17 May 2006)
- Sakura Merry-Men - Marguerite (21 February 2007)
- D-51 - Road (4 February 2009)
- D-Date - 5th Single Joker (22 February 2011)
- SHINee - Boys Meet U (21 August 2013)

== Bibliography ==
=== Books ===
- Sabishii Yoru, Watashi ha Ōgoe de Detaramena Uta o Utau. (Taibundo, 7 August 2008), ISBN 9784803001310
- New Type: Tada, Ai no Tameni (Taibundo, 17 November 2008), cover, ISBN 9784803001440
- Tatsuo Hori - "Kaze Tachinu" (SDP Bunko, 21 September 2008), cover and gravure, ISBN 9784903620336

=== Magazines ===
- Non-no, Shueisha 1971-, as an exclusive model from January 2011
- Seventeen, Shueisha 1967-, as an exclusive model from 2007 to November 2010
- Bessatsu Margaret Shueisha 1964-
- Deluxe Margaret

=== Photobooks ===
- School Girl (Shinpūsha, August 2005), ISBN 9784797478037
- Natsu Shōjo Pictorial Book (June 2006), ISBN 9784123901277
- @me.(Angel Works) (SDP, 24 March 2007), Omnibus Photobook, ISBN 9784903620084
- Aya Omasa First Photo Book (Kadokawa Group Publishing, 19 January 2011), ISBN 9784048949347
- Aya Dictionary A to Z (SDP, 26 June 2012), ISBN 9784903620985

== Awards ==
- 13th Nikkan Sports Drama Grand Prix (2009) - Best Supporting Actress for TBS drama "Yamato Nadeshiko Shichi Henge"
- 4th Gold Make-Up Awards in Category of Mode and Fashion (2012)
