= Nao Matsushita =

Japanese actress and singer (born 1985)

- 松下奈緒
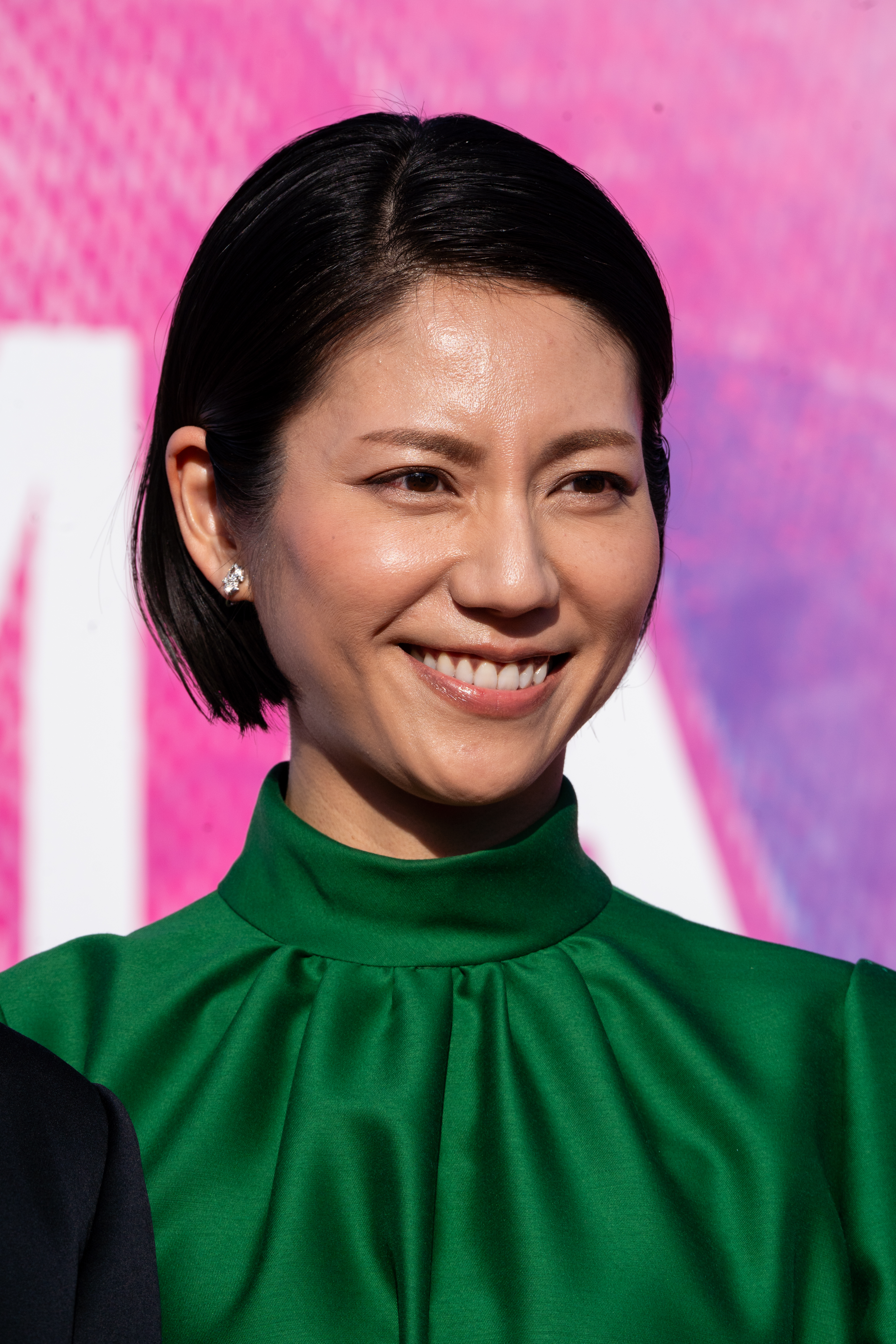
- Matsushita in 2024
- Born: 8 February 1985 (age 41); Ikoma, Nara, Japan
- Occupations: Actress; singer
- Musical career
- Instruments: Piano; vocals
- Years active: 2004–present
- Label: Epic Records
- Website: matsushita-nao.com (in Japanese); Matsushita Nao pianist side official site (in Japanese)

Nao Matsushita (松下 奈緒, Matsushita Nao; born February 8, 1985) is a Japanese actress and singer.

== Personal life ==
Nao was born in Ikoma, Nara on February 8, 1985 and grew up in Kawanishi, Hyōgo. Winning Japan's Elite Model Look started her modeling career in earnest. She attended the Tokyo College of Music.

== Discography ==
=== Singles ===
1. [2007.07.11] Moonshine ～Tsukiakari～ (Moonshine～月あかり～)
2. [2007.12.19] Rain
3. [2008.02.27] Nagareru Kumo Yori mo Hayaku (流れる雲よりもはやく)

=== Albums ===
1. [2006.10.18] dolce
2. [2007.10.10] poco A poco
3. [2008.02.27] Eiga Chest Original Soundtrack (映画「チェスト」オリジナル・サウンドトラック)
4. [2009.02.04] pf

== Filmography ==
=== Television ===
- Ko inu no warutu (2004) Nao plays the Minute Waltz.
- Ningen no Shōmei (2004), Michiko Asaeda
- Koizora, Sky of Love (2008), Sakurai Minako
- Honjitsu mo Hare. Ijo Nashi (2009), Saimon Ulala
- Ohitorisama (2009)
- My Husband Is a Cartoonist (2010), Nunoe Iida
- Control (2011), Rio Segawa
- Dear Sister (2014), Hazuki Fukazawa
- A Song to the Sun (2015, corporate with Vietnamese Television), Asami
- Hayako Sensei, Kekkon Surutte Honto Desu Ka? (2016), Hayako Tatsuki
- Totto-chan! (2017), Chō Kuroyanagi
- Manpuku (2018), Katsuko Kōda
- Doctor-X: Surgeon Michiko Daimon (2021), Akari Nasuda (Nurse X) in episode 5
- Yū-san no Nyōbō (2021), Makiko Ishihara
- Kaze yo Arashi yo (2022), Hiratsuka Raichō
- Ōoku: The Inner Chambers (2023), Tanuma Okitsugu
- Sky Castle (2024), Asami Sae
- The Big Chase: Tokyo SSBC Files (2025–26), Haruka Aoyagi
- The Nurse X (2026), Akari Nasuda

=== Films ===
- X-Cross (2007), Shiyori Mizuno
- Sand Chronicles (2008), Ann Minase
- Angel Sign (2019)
- Kaze yo Arashi yo (2024), Hiratsuka Raichō
- Tea for Three (2024), Satoka Aoe

=== Dubbing ===
- Doctor Strange, Christine Palmer (Rachel McAdams)
- Doctor Strange in the Multiverse of Madness, Christine Palmer (Rachel McAdams)
