= Karina Nose =

Japanese model and actress (born 1984)

Karina
- 香里奈
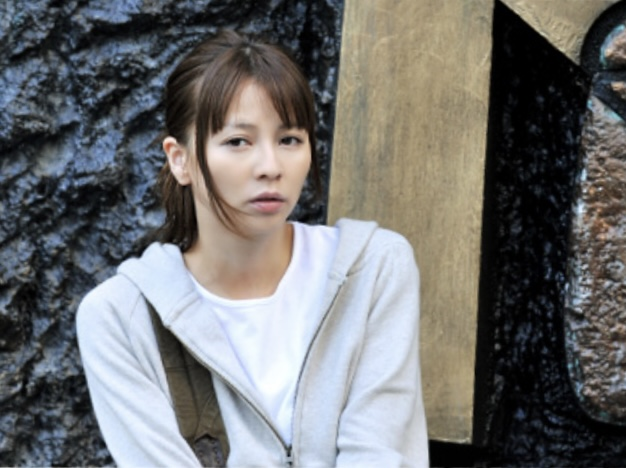
- Karina in 2010
- Born: Karina Nose (能瀬 香里奈); February 21, 1984 (age 42); Shōwa-ku, Nagoya, Japan
- Occupations: Actress, model
- Years active: 2000—present
- Website: www.karina-karina.com

Karina Nose (能瀬 香里奈, Nose Karina; born February 21, 1984), known mononymously as Karina (香里奈), is a Japanese actress and model. She was born in Shōwa-ku, Nagoya, Aichi Prefecture. She played the lead role in the 2008 TBS drama Daisuki!!

== Filmography ==
=== Dramas ===
- Kabachitare (2001)
- Long Love Letter (2002)
- Division 1 (2004)
- Nurseman ga Yuku (2004)
- Umizaru (2005)
- Yaoh (2006)
- CA to Oyobi (2006)
- Message (2006)
- Walk My Way / Boku no Aruku Michi (2006)
- Tsubasa no Oreta Tenshitachi / Angels with Broken Wings (2007)
- Bambino! (2007)
- Ushi ni Negai wo: Love & Farm (2007)
- Daisuki!! (2008)
- Sensei wa Erai! (2008)
- Ryokiteki na Kanojo (2008)
- Kiri no Hi (2008)
- Myu no Anyo Papa ni Ageru (2008)
- Real Clothes (2008) as Kinue Amano
- Galileo: Episode Zero (2008) as Namie Shindo
- Love Shuffle (2009) as Airu Aizawa
- Kochira Katsushika-ku Kameari Koen-mae Hashutsujo (2009) as Catherine Reiko Akimoto
- Hataraku Gon! (2009) as Izumi Ami
- Real Clothes (2009) as Kinue Amano
- Job Hopper Buy a House (2010) as Manami Chiba
- Misaki Number One!! (2011) as Misaki Tenoji
- The Reason I Can't Find My Love (Watashi ga Renai Dekinai Riyuu) (2011) as Emi Fujii
- Dirty Mama! (2012) as Aoi Nagashima
- Honto ni Atta Kowai Hanashi 2012 Aru Natsu no Dekigoto (2012)
- PRICELESS ~Aru Wake Nedaro,n namon!~ (2012) as Aya Nikaido
- Summer Nude (2013) as Natsuki Chiyohara
- kekkonshiki no zenjitsu ni as hitomi serizawa
- kirawareru yuuki (2017) as ando ranko
- AI~watashi to kanojo to jinkou chinou as tanaka shizuku
- takane no hana (2018) as chiaki shinjo (ep.7)
- Koi wa tsuzuku yo doko made mo (2020) as Ryuko Tendo
- Why Didn't I Tell You a Million Times? (2023)

=== Film ===
- Sky of Love (2007)
- Doraemon: The Record of Nobita's Spaceblazer (2009)
- Photograph of Memories (2021)
- And So I'm at a Loss (2023)

== Other works ==
=== Magazines ===
- 『Ray』 (2000-2014)
- 『GINGER』 (2009-)

=== Books ===
- 『KARINA』 (2005.1.25)
- 『I can.』 (2008.10.31)
- 『One.』 (2011.10.27)
