= List of Japanese films of 2011 =

== Highest-grossing films ==
Rank	Title	Gross
1	From Up on Poppy Hill	¥4.46 billion
2	Pokémon the Movie: Black—Victini and Reshiram and White—Victini and Zekrom	¥4.33 billion
3	A Ghost of a Chance	¥4.28 billion
4	Space Battleship Yamato	¥4.10 billion
5	Gantz	¥3.45 billion

== List of films ==
A list of films produced in Japan in 2011 (see 2011 in film):

Opening	Title	Director	Cast	Genre	Notes	Ref
15 January	1,778 Stories of Me and My Wife	Mamoru Hoshi	Tsuyoshi Kusanagi, Yūko Takeuchi	Drama	Based on a true story	
21 January	Inu to Anata no Monogatari	Shunichi Nagasaki	Akira Nakao, Atsuko Takahata	Drama	sequel to film All About My Dog	
22 January	Tensou Sentai Goseiger vs. Shinkenger: Epic on Ginmaku					
29 January	Gantz	Shinsuke Sato	Kazunari Ninomiya, Kenichi Matsuyama		Based on a manga	
29 January	Into the White Night	Yoshihiro Fukagawa	Maki Horikita, Kengo Kora	Drama	Based on a novel	
5 February	Karate Girl	Kimura Yoshikatsu	Rina Takeda, Tobimatsu Hina	Action		
11 February	Patisserie Coin de rue	Yoshihiro Fukagawa	Yōsuke Eguchi, Yū Aoi	Drama		
5 March	Doraemon: Nobita and the New Steel Troops: ~Angel Wings~	Yuichi Shinbo	Wasabi Mizuta, Megumi Ohara, Yumi Kakazu	Anime		
19 March	Runway Beat	Kentaro Otani	Koji Seto, Nanami Sakuraba, Mirei Kiritani	Drama	Based on a cellphone novel	
19 March	Pretty Cure All Stars DX3: Deliver the Future! The Rainbow~Colored Flower That Connects the World!	Takashi Ōtsuka		Anime	Based on an anime television series	
1 April	High School Debut	Tsutomu Hanabusa	Junpei Mizobata, Ito Ōno	Drama	Based on a manga	
1 April	OOO, Den-O, All Riders: Let's Go Kamen Riders	Osamu Kaneda	Shu Watanabe, Dori Sakurada, Ryosuke Miura	Tokusatsu		
2 April	Hoshi no Furumachi	Koji Kawano			Based on a manga	
16 April	Detective Conan: Quarter of Silence	Yasuichiro Yamamoto, Kobun Shizuno		Anime		
16 April	Crayon Shin-chan: The Storm Called: Operation Golden Spy	Sōichi Masui	Akiko Yajima, Miki Narahashi, Keiji Fujiwara	Anime	Based on a manga	
22 April	Underwater Love	Shinji Imaoka	Sawa Masaki	Drama		
23 April	Gantz:Perfect Answer				Based on a manga	
23 April	Hankyū Densha	Yoshishige Miyake	Miki Nakatani	Drama	Based on a novel	
7 May	Gaku: Minna no Yama	Osamu Katayama	Shun Oguri, Masami Nagasawa Kuranosuke Sasaki	Drama	Based on a manga	
7 May	Hoshi o Ou Kodomo	Makoto Shinkai	Hisako Kanemoto, Kazuhiko Inoue	Anime		
28 May	Buddha	Kozo Morishita		Anime		
4 June	Moshidora	Makoto Tanaka	Atsuko Maeda, Koji Seto, Minami Minegishi	Live Action	Based on the book of the same name	
4 June	Paradise Kiss	Takehiko Shinjo	Keiko Kitagawa, Osamu Mukai, Yusuke Yamamoto	Drama	Based on a manga	
4 June	Sengoku Basara: The Last Party	Kazuya Nomura		Anime	Based on a video game	
11 June	Gokaiger Goseiger Super Sentai 199 Hero Great Battle	Noboru Takemoto	Ryota Ozawa, Yuki Yamada, Mao Ichimichi	Tokusatsu		
11 June	Hoshi Mamoru Inu	Tokiyuki Takimoto	Toshiyuki Nishida, Tetsuji Tamayama, Umika Kawashima		Based on a manga	
11 June	I Wish	Hirokazu Koreeda		Drama		
18 June	Yuriko, Dasvidaniya	Sachi Hamano	Nahana, Toi Hitomi, Ren Osugi, Kazuko Yoshiyuki			
18 June	Tokyo Koen	Shinji Aoyama	Haruma Miura, Nana Eikura	Romance	Based on a novel	
25 June	Heaven's Lost Property the Movie: The Angeloid of Clockwork	Hisashi Saitō (Chief director), Tetsuya Yanagisawa	Saori Hayami, Iori Nomizu, Kaori Fukuhara, Yōko Hikasa	Anime	Based on a manga	
2 July	Fullmetal Alchemist the Movie: The Sacred Star of Milos	Murata Kasuya	Romi Paku, Rie Kugimiya	Anime	Based on the characters and the manga created by Hiromu Arakawa	
16 July	From up on Poppy Hill	Gorō Miyazaki	Nagasawa Masami, Okada Junichi	Anime drama	Based on a manga	
16 July	Victini and the Black Hero			Anime		
23 July	Deadball	Yudai Yamaguchi	Tak Sakaguchi, Mari Hoshino, Miho Ninagawa	splatter comedy		
23 July	Ninja Kids!!!	Takashi Miike	Seishiro Kato			
23 July	Rock: Wanko no Shima	Isamu Nakae		Drama	Based on a true story	
23 July	Yakuza Weapon	Tak Sakaguchi, Yudai Yamaguchi	Tak Sakaguchi, Shingo Tsurumi, Mei Kurokawa			
30 July	Naruto Shippūden 5: Blood Prison	Masahiko Murata	Junko Takeuchi	Fantasy anime	Based on a manga	
6 August	Kochikame	Yasuhiro Kawamura	Shingo Katori, Karina	Drama	Continuation of a television series of the same name	
6 August	Snowflake	Masaaki Taniguchi	Mirei Kiritani, Haru Aoyama	Romance		
6 August	Ranhansha	Masaaki Taniguchi	Mirei Kiritani, Takahiro Miura	Romance		
20 August	Usagi Drop	Sabu	Kenichi Matsuyama, Mana Ashida	Comedy	based on the manga Bunny Drop	
27 August	Hayate the Combat Butler! Heaven Is a Place on Earth	Hideto Komori	Ryōko Shiraishi, Rie Kugimiya, Rie Tanaka, Shizuka Itou, Mikako Takahashi	Anime	Based on a manga	
27 August	Kamisama no Karute	Yoshihiro Fukagawa	Aoi Miyazaki, Sho Sakurai	Drama	Based on a novel	
27 August	Mahou Sensei Negima! Anime Final			Anime		
3 September	Hanezu	Naomi Kawase			Entered into the 2011 Cannes Film Festival	
3 September	Tekken: Blood Vengeance	Youichi Mori	Maaya Sakamoto, Yuki Matsuoka, Mamoru Miyano	Anime	Based on a video game	
7 September	Tormented	Takashi Shimizu	Hikari Mitsushima, Teruyuki Kagawa	Horror		
10 September	Tantei wa Bar ni Iru	Hajime Hashimoto	Yo Oizumi, Koyuki, Ryuhei Matsuda, Toshiyuki Nishida			
17 September	Hotarubi no Mori e	Takahiro Omori		Anime	Based on a manga	
17 September	Muybridge's Strings (Maiburijji no ito)	Kōji Yamamura		Animated short	Canada-Japan coproduction	
24 September	Household X	Kōki Yoshida	Kaho Minami, Tomorowo Taguchi, Tomohiro Kaku			
1 October	Dog×Police	Go Shichitaka	Erika Toda, Hayato Ichihara			
1 October	Tengoku Kara no Yell	Chikato Kumazawa	Hiroshi Abe, Nanami Sakuraba	Drama	Based on a true story	
1 October	To Aru Hikūshi e no Tsuioku	Jun Shishido	Ryunosuke Kamiki, Seika Taketomi	Anime	Based on a light novel	
8 October	Tsure ga Utsu ni Narimashite	Kiyoshi Sasabe	Aoi Miyazaki; Masato Sakai		Based on a manga	
8 October	Vampire Stories Brothers	Hikaru Gotō	Tomo Yanagishita, Tetsuya Makita, Takako Hasuna	Fantasy, Action, Romance		
8 October	Yoake no Machi de	Setsurō Wakamatsu	Gorō Kishitani, Kyoko Fukada, Tae Kimura		Based on a novel	
15 October	Enkiri Village: Dead End Survival	Kōichi Tsubaki	Reina Fujie, Ren Yagami, Mayuka Okada	Horror		
15 October	Hara-Kiri: Death of a Samurai	Takashi Miike	Ebizo Ichikawa, Eita, Hikari Mitsushima	Drama		
15 October	Tamatama	Mayumi Komatsu	Yū Aoi	Drama		
15 October	Karate-Robo Zaborgar	Noboru Iguchi	Itsuji Itao, Yasuhisa Furuhara, Mami Yamasaki			
15 October	Messiah	Kaneko Shusuke	Arai Atsushi, Inoue Masahiro, Kinomoto Minehiro, Jinnai Sho	Live Action	Based on a manga	
22 October	Gyokairui Yamaoka Maiko	Ryūtarō Kajino	Uki Satake, Kokoro Takami, Miho Matsushita	Fantasy		
22 October	Smuggler	Katsuhito Ishii	Satoshi Tsumabuki, Masatoshi Nagase, Yasuko Matsuyuki		Based on a manga	
22 October	Cheerfu11y	Sho Tsukikawa	You Kikkawa, Akari Hayami, Anna Tamai			
22 October	Saudade	Katsuya Tomita				
29 October	Gomen-nasai	Mari Asato	Miyabi Natsuyaki, Airi Suzuki, Momoko Tsugunaga	Horror		
29 October	Once in a Blue Moon	Kōki Mitani	Eri Fukatsu, Toshiyuki Nishida, Hiroshi Abe, Yūko Takeuchi	Comedy		
29 October	Waya! Uchuu Ichi no Osekkai Daisakusen	Kohatsu Yo	Jurina Matsui, Yagami Kumi, Itoda Jun	Drama		
5 November	Bokutachi no After School	Shōta Sasaki	Choshinsei members	Drama		
5 November	Hara ga Kore Nande	Yuya Ishii	Riisa Naka, Aoi Nakamura			
5 November	Kaiji 2				Based on a manga	
12 November	Guilty of Romance	Sion Sono	Miki Mizuno, Makoto Togashi, Megumi Kagurazaka			
12 November	Koitanibashi	Kōichi Gotō	Takako Uehara, Kensei Mikami	Drama		
12 November	Share House	Ichirō Kita	Kazuko Yoshiyuki, Megumi Saeki, Miyoko Asada, Hana Kino	Drama		
19 November	Antoki no Inochi	Takahisa Zeze	Masaki Okada, Nana Eikura	Romance, Drama	Based on a novel	
19 November	Kami Voice	Tomoki Sano	Yūki Kaji, Wataru Hatano, Roko Takizawa		Based on a manga	
19 November	Yubiwa wo Hametai	Yuki Iwata	Takayuki Yamada, Manami Konishi, Yoko Maki, Chizuru Ikewaki		Based on a novel	
26 November	Gal Basara: Sengoku Jidai wa Kengai Desu	Futoshi Sato	Hiroki Matsutaka, Kasumi Arimura, Seika Taketomi, Mariko Shinoda			
26 November	Kisei Jūi Suzune	Ryu Kaneda	Rei Yoshii, Megumi Kagurazaka		Based on a manga	
26 November	Hard Romantic-er	Gu Su Yeon	Shota Matsuda, Kento Nagayama, Yoko Maki, Dai Watanabe			
26 November	Kokkuri-san: Gekijoban	Jirō Nagae	Mariya Suzuki, Asuka Kataoka, Shizuka Umemoto	Horror		
26 November	Kurosawa Eiga 2011	Taku Watanabe	Kazuko Kurosawa, Gong Teyu	Drama	Sequel to Kurosawa Eiga	
3 December	Crossroads	Masatoshi Kurakata		Drama	Sequel to the film Railways	
3 December	K-On!	Naoko Yamada		Anime	Sequel to anime	
3 December	Lost Harmony	Toki Yoshimasa	Alice Hirose, Ayako Yoshitani, Mitsuki Takahata	Horror		
10 December	Genji Monogatari: Sennen no Nazo	Yasuo Tsuruhashi	Toma Ikuta, Miki Nakatani	Drama	Based on a Japanese classic literary text	
10 December	Kamen Rider × Kamen Rider Fourze & OOO: Movie War Mega Max	Koichi Sakamoto	Sota Fukushi, Ryuki Takahashi, Fumika Shimizu	Tokusatsu	Part of the Kamen Rider Series	
17 December	Being Mitsuko	Kenji Yamauchi	Eriko Hatsune, Kei Ishibashi	Drama		
17 December	Friends: Mononoke Shima no Naki	Takashi Yamazaki, Ryuichi Yagi	Shingo Katori, Koichi Yamadera	Anime	Based on a children's novel	
17 December	Ōsama Game	Norio Tsuruta	Airi Suzuki, Yurina Kumai, Dori Sakurada	Horror		
21 December	Wild 7	Eiichirō Hasumi			Based on a manga	
23 December	Rengō Kantai Shirei Chōkan: Yamamoto Isoroku	Izuru Narushima	Kōji Yakusho, Hiroshi Abe	War drama		
