= Taiikukan Baby =

2008 film by Yoshihiro Fukagawa

- Film poster
- Directed by: Yoshihiro Fukagawa
- Screenplay by: Keiko Kanome; Yoshihiro Fukagawa
- Based on: Taiikukan Baby by Keiko Kanome
- Produced by: Takashi Ōhashi; Hirofumi Ogoshi; Midori Okude; Ryūtarō Ueda
- Starring: Yūichi Nakamura; Yūta Takahashi; Shō Kubo; Mirei Kiritani; Nanami Sakuraba; Makoto Kawahara; Tomoya Nagai; Ema Fujisawa; Ikkei Watanabe
- Cinematography: Hikaru Yasuda
- Edited by: Yui Miyatake
- Music by: Mamiko Hirai
- Production company: SPO Entertainment
- Distributed by: SPO Entertainment
- Release date: 10 May 2008 (Japan)
- Running time: 89 minutes
- Country: Japan
- Language: Japanese

Taiikukan Baby (Japanese: 体育館ベイビー, Hepburn: Taiikukan Beibī), also known as Gymnasium Baby, is a 2008 Japanese romantic drama film directed by Yoshihiro Fukagawa and based on the novel of the same name by Keiko Kanome. The film stars Yūichi Nakamura as Jun Shibahara, Yūta Takahashi as Naoki Murai and Shō Kubo as Shōichi Kato. The film was released on May 10, 2008. The movie also had a sister film which premiered simultaneously, titled Classmates, which is composed of the same cast but with different plot and without BL themes.

== Plot ==
Jun Shibahara is a high school student with high expectations for swimming, but as the team coach's son he is nicknamed "Taiikukan Baby" (gymnasium baby) and no one believes his position is due to his own merits. Jun also must deal with constant rumors that his father got his late mother pregnant (who was one of his students) and never married her, another reason why he is nicknamed like that. After being diagnosed with hypertrophic cardiomyopathy, Jun is forced to stop swimming and loses all reason to exist. During his visits to the hospital he meets Nozomi Hayakawa, a classmate who has been admitted due to a cancer and learns that she has not much time left.

Shortly after, his replacement in the swimming team, a boy named Naoki Murai, asks Jun to be his coach since he sees him as his idol. Jun and Naoki start to spend time together, with Naoki soon confessing his feelings for Jun and kissing him, which leaves the later shocked and confused. Jun soon tells what happened to his best friend Shōichi Katō, who takes an overprotective attitude towards him and another defensive towards Naoki, since he is also in love with Jun. Both boys swear a mutual rivalry that starts a complicated love triangle. Naoki and Shōichi compete in order to win Jun's affections, but Jun is not able to reciprocate the feelings of either of them, as he is also dealing with his illness and forced exit from the swimming world.

Finally, on the day of the graduation, Naoki tries to kiss Jun in the middle of the ceremony after receiving his diploma, only to be stopped by Shōichi, who bursts into the kiss by interposing a photograph of the already deceased Nozomi. A very frustrated and embarrassed Jun leaves the ceremony while telling both suitors to follow him. The film ends with the three boys walking away while laughing.

== Cast ==
- Yūichi Nakamura as Jun Shibahara
- Yūta Takahashi as Naoki Murai
- Shō Kubō as Shōichi Kato
- Mirei Kiritani as Nozomi Hayakawa
- Nanami Sakuraba as Yūki Hayakawa
- Makoto Kawahara as Hikari Ijima
- Tomoya Nagai as Makoto Fujisawa
- Ema Fujisawa as Michiru Yada
- Ikkei Watanabe as Yasushi Shibahara
- Mayuko Irie as Nozomi's Mother
