= Classmates (2008 film) =

2008 Japanese film by Yoshihiro Fukagawa

- Film poster
- Directed by: Yoshihiro Fukagawa
- Screenplay by: Yoshihiro Fukagawa; Keiko Kanome
- Based on: Dōkyūsei by Keiko Kanome
- Produced by: Takashi Ōhashi; Hirofumi Ogoshi; Midori Okude; Ryūtarō Ueda
- Starring: Yūichi Nakamura; Mirei Kiritani; Yūta Takahashi; Shō Kubo; Nanami Sakuraba; Makoto Kawahara; Tomoya Nagai; Ema Fujisawa; Ikkei Watanabe
- Cinematography: Hikaru Yasuda
- Edited by: Tsuyoshi Wada
- Music by: Mamiko Hirai
- Production company: SPO Entertainment
- Distributed by: SPO Entertainment
- Release date: 10 May 2008 (Japan)
- Running time: 86 minutes
- Country: Japan
- Language: Japanese

Classmates (Japanese: 同級生, Hepburn: Dōkyūsei) is a 2008 Japanese romantic drama film directed by Yoshihiro Fukagawa and based on the novel of the same name by Keiko Kanome. The film stars Yūichi Nakamura as Jun Shibahara, Mirei Kiritani as Nozomi Hayakawa and Yūta Takahashi as Naoki Murai. The film was released on May 10, 2008. The movie also had a sister film which premiered simultaneously, titled Taiikukan Baby, which is composed of the same cast but with different plot and with BL themes.

== Plot ==
Jun Shibahara is the best in the school's swimming team. One day, he passes out and in the hospital, he is diagnosed with hypertrophic cardiomyopathy, forcing him to retire from swimming. Jun loses all reason to exist and falls in depression. Suddenly though, he receives an email to his cellphone by someone else named Jun. They start emailing each other more and soon friendship becomes love. This makes Jun realize that swimming is not everything in life and they decide to go to the same university. However, happiness soon becomes tragedy.

== Cast ==
- Yūichi Nakamura as Jun Shibahara
- Mirei Kiritani as Nozomi Hayakawa
- Yūta Takahashi as Naoki Murai
- Shō Kubō as Shōichi Kato
- Nanami Sakuraba as Yūki Hayakawa
- Makoto Kawahara as Hikari Ijima
- Tomoya Nagai as Makoto Fujisawa
- Ema Fujisawa as Michiru Yada
- Mayuko Irie as Nozomi's Mother
- Ikkei Watanabe as Yasushi Shibahara
