= Shinjiro Atae =

- 與 真司郎
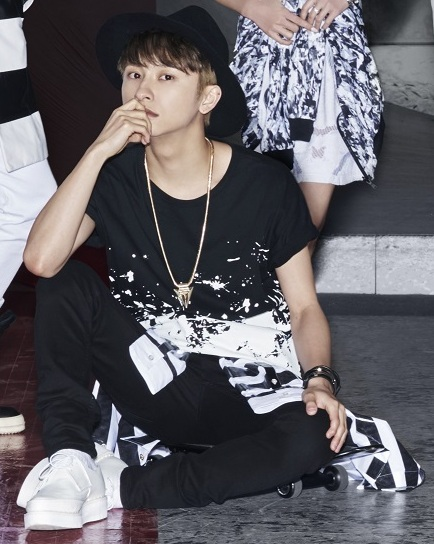
- Atae in 2015
- Born: November 26, 1988 (age 37); Kyoto, Japan
- Occupations: Singer-songwriter; actor; model
- Years active: 2005-present
- Height: 171 cm (5 ft 7 in)
- Musical career
- Genres: J-pop
- Instrument: Vocals
- Label: Avex Trax
- Member of: AAA
- Website: avex.jp/atae

Shinjiro Atae (與 真司郎, Atae Shinjirō; born November 26, 1988) is a Japanese singer-songwriter, actor, and model. He debuted as a member of the co-ed group AAA in 2005. Early on in his career, Atae starred in television and film projects including the live-action adaptations of Psychic Detective Yakumo, Delicious Gakuin, Teiō, Guardian Angel, and Ramune.

In 2016, Atae released music solo, beginning with the song "Reunited", and later released his first solo album, This Is Who I Am, as a limited release in 2018. He is also an exclusive model in the magazines Junon and Duet.

== Career ==
=== 2005–2015: AAA and early acting career ===
Atae was accepted into Avex when he was 14 years old and debuted as a member of the co-ed group AAA in September 2005. In 2006, he also began making acting appearances on television, with his debut role in Karera no Umi VIII: Sentimental Journey, which starred other AAA members. In the same year, he starred in the live-action television drama adaptation of Psychic Detective Yakumo, and in 2007, he co-starred in Delicious Gakuin.

In 2009, Atae co-starred in the film Guardian Angel and also played lead in the television drama Teiō. In 2010, he starred in the film Ramune and also recorded the theme song, "Kimi ga Ireba", as a featured artist with Hiroki Maekawa, which was later released as a digital single. On December 15, 2010, he released his first photo book, Shinking.

Atae was a featured artist on Maekawa's song, "Kimi ga Daisuki de", which was released on March 7, 2012. On March 30, 2013, he released his photo book, Atae Best. He was featured in a dating sim visual novel game titled AAA Shinjiro Atae Love Trip, which was released on October 24, 2014.

=== 2016–present: Solo music career ===
Atae took a brief hiatus in the spring of 2016 to study at a university in Los Angeles, California. On May 14, 2016, he released a photo book, Just the Beginning, which was shot during his studies abroad. On June 20, 2016, due to fan demand, Atae released the song "Reunited" as a digital single, which was originally released on the DVD bundled with Just the Beginning. The song is described as a love song written in English. "Reunited" peaked at #1 on iTunes in Japan.

On July 19, 2017, Atae released "Goody-Good Girl" as a digital single. Later in the year, he released "Can't Stop" and performed both songs at the Girls Award 2017 Spring/Summer and the 2017 Tokyo Girls Collection fashion shows. In August 2017, he started his own fashion brand, I Am What I Am. On November 2, 2017, he released his travel book, Shinjiro's Travel Book, which documented his experiences while studying abroad in Los Angeles in 2016.

In May 2018, Atae announced he was releasing his album, This Is Who I Am, on November 26, 2018, to celebrate his 30th birthday. On June 18, 2018, he pre-released "Gold Mine" as a digital single. Up until the release of the album, he also pre-released the music videos for "Baby", "Love Sugar", and "You Only Live Once."

In May 2019, Atae held his first solo concert on a 6-day tour. In September 2019, he collaborated with Thelma Aoyama to compose and write the song "Suki Suki Suki." In November 2019, he was announced as the image model of the jewelry brand Empathy All People. For his 31st birthday, on November 26, 2019, he released the song "Follow Me" as the theme song used in the commercials for haircare brand Nalow, which he also appeared in.

In November 2020, Atae announced through his official website and social media that he was putting his entertainment career on hold following AAA's hiatus in 2021. On August 11, 2021, right before he went on hiatus, he released his second album, This is Where We Promise.

== Personal life ==
Aside from his native Japanese, Atae is fluent in English, having learned English as a hobby and being a student at ECC since he was in elementary school. In 2015, he collaborated with ECC to release a series of English conversation videos and led an English conversation class for 20 students.

At a fan meeting on July 26, 2023, he came out publicly as gay in front of 2,000 fans. Atae also announced he is working on a documentary about his life and journey, which will be produced by Academy Award winners Peter Farrelly and Fisher Stevens. Details about the upcoming project are still being kept under wraps, but a press release did confirm direction will be at the hands of creative duo Carlie Mantilla-Jordan and John Eliot Jordan, who are long-time friends of Atae.

== Discography ==
=== Studio albums ===
Title	Year	Details	Peak chart positions	Sales
Title	Year	Details	JPN	Sales
This Is Who I Am	2018	Released: November 26, 2018; Label: Avex Trax; Format: CD, digital download; Track listing: 1. "Love Sugar"; 2. "Can't Stop"; 3. "Light My Fire"; 4. "Baby"; 5. "Undercover"; 6. "Goody-Good Girl"; 7. "Gold Mine"; 8. "Winterland"; 9. "Show Me"; 10. "Reunited"; 11. "You Only Live Once"	—	
This Is Where We Promise	2021	Released: August 11, 2021; Label: Avex Trax; Format: CD, digital download; Track listing: 1. "How We Do It"; 2. "Say My Name"; 3. "Jump"; 4. "Honey"; 5. "Suki Suki Suki"; 6. "Your Eyes"; 7. "Cry"; 8. "Follow Me"; 9. "Never Mind"; 10. "Bye Bye"; 11. "California Dreaming"; 12. "This Is Where We Promise"	4	—
This Is How I Am	2026	Released: April 22, 2026; Label: True Self; Format: CD, digital download	9	JPN: 4,737
"—" denotes releases that did not chart or were not released in that region.

=== Singles ===
==== As lead artist ====
Title	Year	Album
"Reunited"	2016	This Is Who I Am
"Goody-Good Girl"	2017	This Is Who I Am
"Can't Stop"	2017	This Is Who I Am
"Gold Mine"	2018	This Is Who I Am
"California Dreaming"	2019	This is Where We Promise
"Never Mind"	2019	This is Where We Promise
"Follow Me"	2019	Non-album single

==== As featured artist ====
Title	Year	Peak chart positions	Album
Title	Year	JPN	Album
"Kimi ga Ireba" (君がいれば) (Hiroki Maekawa feat. Shinjiro Atae)	2010	—	Non-album singles
"Kimi ga Daisuki de" (君が大好きで) (Note: "Kimi ga Daisuki de" was released as a physical double A-side single with "Do Wak Parappa." Oricon reflects sales and rankings for both "Kimi ga Daisuki de" and "Do Wak Parappa", while Atae was featured on "Kimi ga Daisuki de" only.) (Hiroki Maekawa feat. Shinjiro Atae (AAA))	2012	31	Non-album singles
"Suki Suki Suki" (好き好き好き) (Shinjiro Atae × Thelma Aoyama)	2019	19	This is Where We Promise
"—" denotes releases that did not chart or were not released in that region.

== Filmography ==
=== Television ===
Year	Title	Role	Network	Notes
2006	Karera no Umi VIII: Sentimental Journey		Fuji TV	
2006	Psychic Detective Yakumo	Yakumo Saito	TV Tokyo	Lead role
2007	Delicious Gakuin	Shugo Katsuragi	TV Tokyo	Lead role
2008	Mirai Seiki Shakespeare	Various roles	Kansai TV	
2009	Love Game	Haruki Akiyama	Nippon TV	Episode 5
2009	Teiō	Eitarō Ogawa	TBS	Lead role

=== Films ===
Year	Title	Role	Notes
2009	Guardian Angel	Daichi Sasaki	Lead role
2010	Ramune	Yosuke	Lead role

=== Solo DVDs ===
List of solo DVDs, with selected details and chart position
Title	Year	Details	Peak chart positions
Title	Year	Details	JPN
New Discovery in Hawaii	2013	Released: May 1, 2013; Label: Avex Trax; Formats: DVD	27

== Publications ==
=== Photo books ===
Year	Title	Publisher	ISBN
2010	Shinjiro Atae First Photo Book: Shinking (與真司郎ファースト写真集 Shinking)	Gakken	ISBN 978-4054047983
2013	Atae Best: Shinjiro Atae Photo Book (ATAE BEST ~與真司郎写真集~)	Shufu to Seikatsu-sha	ISBN 978-4391143195
2015	The Way I Am	Shufu to Seikatsu-sha	ISBN 978-4391147575
2016	Just the Beginning	Shufu to Seikatsu-sha	ISBN 978-4391148657

=== Photo essays ===
Year	Title	Publisher	ISBN
2014	Shinjiro's Photos: Travel & Style Book	Shufu to Seikatsu-sha	ISBN 978-4391144840
2017	Shinjiro's Travel Book	Shufu to Seikatsu-sha	ISBN 978-4391151206
