= Sonoko Inoue =

Japanese singer, songwriter and actress (born 1997)

- 井上 苑子
- Born: December 11, 1997 (age 27); Kobe, Hyōgo Prefecture, Japan
- Occupations: Singer; songwriter; actress
- Years active: 2009–present
- Musical career
- Genres: J-pop
- Instruments: Vocals; guitar
- Labels: Tsubasa Records/Space Shower Music (2013-2015); EMI Records Japan (2015-2020); Tsubasa Records (2020-present)
- Website: www.inoue-sonoko.com

Sonoko Inoue (井上 苑子, Inoue Sonoko, born December 11, 1997 in Kobe, Hyōgo Prefecture) is a Japanese singer, songwriter and actress. She lived in Osaka, Osaka Prefecture until junior high school and moved to the Kantō region when she had a high school opportunity. She is nicknamed Son-chan (そんちゃん) and sonko.

== Discography ==
※Oricon Weekly Chart highest ranking.

=== Singles ===
No.	Year	Title	Form	Standard part no.	Ranking	Ref.
Independent production
1	2010	"sonority"	CD	—	—	
2	2011	"sonority II"	CD	—	—	
3	2011	"sonority III"	CD	—	—	
Indie label
1	2013	"Sorairo Blue"	CD	XQJZ-1008	Outside range	
2	2013	"Unmei-sen Believer"	CD	XQJZ-1014	180	
3	2014	"Sentimental Sixteen"	CD	XQJZ-1020	Outside range	
4	2014	"Akai Muffler"	CD	XQJZ-1040	107	
Major label
1	2015	"Daisuki."	CD+Wego Collab Muffler; CD	5903-PRON; UPCH-80416	48	
2	2016	"Natsukoi"	Live DVD+CD; CD	UPCH-89264; UPCH-80433	17	
3	2016	"Eru"	CD	UPCH-80453	43	
4	2017	"Message"	Live DVD+CD; CD	UPCH-89327; UPCH-80466	12	
5	2017	"Namida"	CD+DVD; CD	UPCH-89336; UPCH-80473	31	
6	2017	"The Best In The World"	CD+DVD; CD	UPCH-89336; UPCH-80483	31	
7	2018	"Fantastic"	CD+DVD; CD	UPCH-89394; UPCH-80502	35	

=== Albums ===
No.	Year	Title	Form	Standard part no.	Ranking
Indie label
1	2014	Senkō Hanabi	CD	XQJZ-1030	155
Major label
1	2016	Hello	CD	UPCH-20414	16
2	2017	JUKE BOX	CD+DVD; CD	UPCH-29273; UPCH-20467	26
3	2019	Shiroto Iroiro	CD+DVD; CD	UPCH-29326; UPCH-20512	19

=== Mini-albums ===
No.	Year	Title	Form	Standard part no.	Ranking
1	2015	#17	CD+DVD; CD	29191-UPCH; UPCH-20395	66
2	2018	Mine.	CD	UPCH-20489	24
3	2020	Harezora	CD+DVD; CD	UPCH-29356; UPCH-29357	23
4	2021	PAN tto Oto ga Shita	CD+DVD; CD	TRAK-0171/2; TRAK-0173	TBA

== Music videos ==
Director	Title
Sonoko Inoue	"Ao to Orange"
Gen Natsume	"Senkō Hanabi"
Kei Ikeda	"Unmei-sen Believer"
Unknown	"Sorairo Blue", "Good day", "Sentimental Sixteen"

== Tie-ups ==
Title	Tie-up	Ref.
"Natsukoi"	Johnson & Johnson Acuvue advert song; TV Tokyo drama Koe Koi ending theme	

== Live performances ==
=== Solo live performances ===
Year	Title
2014	Sonoko Inoue Birthday One-man Live: 17-saiya de! Otonana Live ni surude!
2016	Sonoko Inoue Kōkō Sotsugyō Kinen Special One-man Live Sotsugyō. Watashitachi no JK Kanketsu!
2016	Sonoko Inoue 1st Summer Tour 2016: Minna o Matase!

=== Appearing events ===
Year	Title
2013	The Library vol. 2
2013	Ontama Otodama Sea Studio 2013: Sunset Beach 2013
2013	BiS Shusai: Shelter 7 Days
2013	The Library vol. 4
2013	Yokohama Live Jack 2013: Christmas Special
2014	Strobe Night Bangai-hen: eggman 33rd anniversary
2014	Ryūkō-sei Ketsumakuen #279
2014	Girls Rock Summer Splash!! 2014
2015	Green of Music Fes
2015	Rock in Japan Festival
2016	Ontama Otodama Sea Studio 2016: Umi no Uta 2016

== Filmography ==
=== TV drama ===
Year	Title	Role	Network	Notes	Ref.
2013	Y.O.U: Yamabiko Ongaku Dōkō-kai	Yasushioto Takimoto	KTV		
2016	Sukinahito ga Iru Koto		Fuji TV	Episode 3	

=== Internet series ===
Year	Title	Website
2016	Sukinahito ga Iru Koto	Fuji TV On Demand

=== Films ===
Year	Title	Role	Notes	Ref.
2015	Watashitachi no Haahaa	Ichinose	Lead role	

=== TV series ===
Year	Title	Network	Notes
2016	EX Theater TV	TV Asahi	MC
2016	Test no Hanamichi New Ben Semi	NHK-E	

=== Stage ===
Year	Title	Notes
2011	Nelke Planning: Sekai no Owari to Hajimari to	Co-starring with Mao Miyaji

=== Radio ===
Year	Title	Network	Notes	Ref.
2016	Sonoko Inoue no All Night Nippon 0	NBS	Monday personality	

=== Advertisements, public relations ===
Year	Title	Notes	Ref.
	Kokuyo Campus Dot Liner Fitz	Image character	
2016	Johnson & Johnson Acuvue	Also did the song in the advert	

=== Others ===
Year	Title	Notes
2014	Go! Go! Guitar	June 2014 issue; cover model

== Awards ==
- Sky PerfecTV! Movie Channel Award (Watashitachi no Haahaa)
- Fanta Land Award (Watashitachi no Haahaa)

== See also ==
- Especia, girl group who shared the same office as Inoue
