= Arakawa Under the Bridge (film) =

- Film poster advertising this film in Japan
- Directed by: Iizuka Ken
- Written by: Nakamura Hikaru (manga)
- Starring: Kento Hayashi; Mirei Kiritani
- Distributed by: Asmik Ace Entertainment
- Release date: 4 February 2012 (Japan)
- Country: Japan
- Language: Japanese

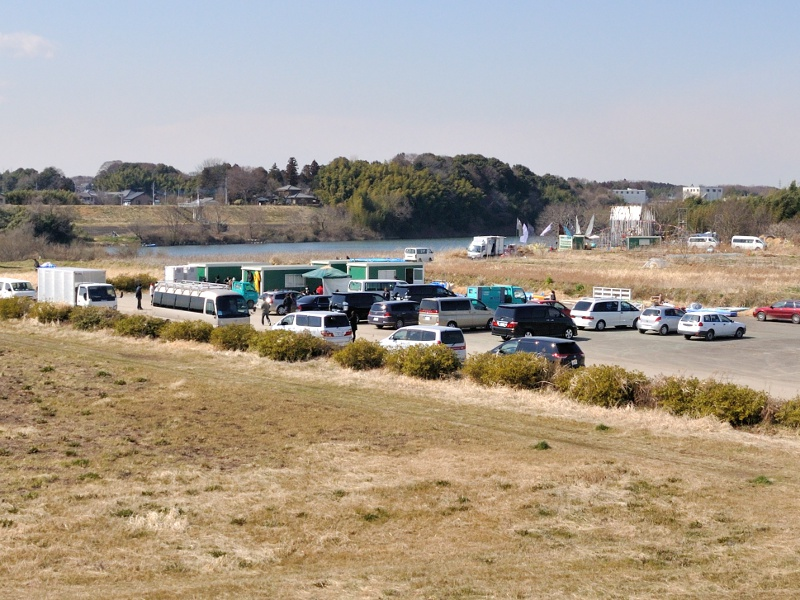
Arakawa Under the Bridge filming location (Jōsō, Ibaraki)

Arakawa Under the Bridge (荒川アンダー ザ ブリッジ, Arakawa andā za burijji) is a 2012 Japanese film. It is based on a manga of the same name and it is directed by the director Iizuka Ken. The film stars Kento Hayashi, Mirei Kiritani and released in Japanese cinemas on February 4, 2012.

== Cast ==
- Kento Hayashi as Riku/Kou Ichinomiya
- Mirei Kiritani as Nino
- Nana Katase as Maria
- Yu Shirota as Sister
- Natsumi Abe as P-ko
- Takaya Kamikawa as Seki Ichinomiya, the father of Riku and head of Ichinomiya company.
- Masahiro Takashima as Takayashiki, a government ministry member and a friend of Seki.
- Kazuyuki Asano as Takai, an Ichinomiya Company employee.
- Waka Inoue as Shimazaki, an Ichinomiya Company employee.
- Shun Oguri as the Village Chief
- Takayuki Yamada as Hoshi, a self-proclaimed rock star who is in love with Nino.

== Filming Location ==
Film sets were built in the dry riverbed of Kinugawa River in Jōsō, Ibaraki, Japan for Arakawa Under the Bridge.
