= Yūta Takahashi =

Japanese actor, entertainer and model (born 1984)

- 高橋 優太
- Born: May 31, 1984 (age 42); Tokyo, Japan
- Education: Aoyama University
- Occupations: Actor; model
- Years active: 2007–present
- Agent: MerryGoRound Inc.
- Height: 180 cm (5 ft 11 in)

Yūta Takahashi (高橋 優太, Takahashi Yūta; born May 31, 1984) is a Japanese actor, entertainer and model. He is best known for his roles as Sadaharu Inui of the fourth generation Seigaku cast in The Prince of Tennis musical series, Tenimyu, and Shijo Haruki in Hanazakari no Kimitachi e series. He was a Super Junon contestant and winner in 2006. He is represented by MerryGoRound Inc.

== Filmography ==
=== Movies ===
- Classmates (2008) as Naoki Murai
- Taiikukan Baby (2008) as Naoki Murai
- Takumi-kun Series 2: Niji Irō no Garasu (2009) as Takeshi Suzuki
- Tsuki to Uso to Satsujin (2010) as Taniguchi
- Junjō (2010) as Shōsei Kurata

=== Television ===
- Hanazakari no Kimitachi e (2007, Fuji TV) as Haruki Shijō
- Dansei Fushin no Otome (2008, TV Asahi)
- Cafe Kichijoji de (2008, TV Tokyo)
- Hanazakari no Kimitachi e 2 (2008, Fuji TV) as Haruki Shijō
- Shugoshin Bodyguard Shindō Teru (2013, TBS), episode 3
- Suiri sakka Ike Kayoko (2013, Fuji TV)

=== Stage ===
TENIMYU: THE PRINCE OF TENNIS MUSICAL SERIES (as Sadaharu Inui)

- The Prince of Tennis Musical: The Progressive Match Higa Chuu feat. Rikkai (In Winter 2007-2008)
- The Prince of Tennis Musical: Dream Live 5th (2008)
- The Prince of Tennis Musical: The Imperial Presence Hyotei Gakuen feat. Higa Chuu (2008)
- The Prince of Tennis Musical: The Treasure Match Shitenhouji feat. Hyotei Gakuen (2008-2009)
- The Prince of Tennis Musical: Dream Live 6th (2009)
