= Atelier (TV series) =

Japanese television series

Netflix title format

Atelier (アンダーウェア, Andāwea; meaning Underwear) is a Japanese drama television series developed by Fuji Television for Netflix. It is a coming of age drama set in a small high-class lingerie design house called Emotion, which is based in Tokyo's Ginza district. The drama centres around Mayuko Tokita, a new employee, and her struggle to find her place at Emotion.

Central to that struggle is her relationship with Mayumi Nanjo the creator and owner of Emotion, who has been compared to Anna Wintour, an editor of American Vogue.

== Cast and characters ==
The main cast includes:

- Mirei Kiritani as Mayuko Tokita (時田 繭子, Tokita Mayuko) a "fabric geek" who joins Emotion in the first episode.
- Mao Daichi as Mayumi Nanjo (南上 マユミ, Nanjō Mayumi), the founder and president of Emotion. She eschews mass production in favour of one-off and limited production.
- Mayuko Kawakita as Yuri Kouno (鴻野 由梨, Kōno Yuri), best friend of Mayuko who works for a wedding dress company and started work the same day as Mayuko.
- Wakana Sakai as Mizuki Nishizawa (西沢 瑞希, Nishizawa Mizuki), a senior lingerie designer at Emotion. She originally left Emotion to start her own brand but later returns to the company.
- Ken Kaito (海東健 Kaitō Ken) as Jin Saruhashi (猿橋 仁, Saruhashi Jin), the office manager. Cool on the outside, he joined Emotion because he was passionate about the way Nanjo did business.
- Maiko as Fumika Iida, a senior lingerie designer at Emotion, who leaves the company to join one of their competitors.
- Masako Chiba (千葉雅子 Chiba Masako) as Reiko Tanaka (田中 麗子, Tanaka Reiko), Nanjo's most trusted employee, who also takes Mayuko under her wing when she first arrives at the company.
- Dori Sakurada as Sousuke Himeji (姫路 宗介, Himeji Sōsuke), assistant to Jin. He later resigns from Emotion to save the company from bankruptcy and pursue his own career.
- Nicole Ishida (石田ニコル Ishida Nikoru) as Sarii Machida (町田 沙里衣, Machida Sarii), a down on her luck model, who Mayuko befriends. Later in the series, Machida finds success as a supermodel.
- Toshi Takeuchi as Naomichi Kaji, a young man who later joined Emotion as a part-timer. He develops a crush on Mayuko.
- Hisahiro Ogura as Mr. Yamazaki, the manager of Shikishima Coffee, where Mayuko and Yuri occasionally hang out. He and Nanjo knew each other back in high school.
- Megumi Sato as Rin Nakatani, a manager of a Carolina Herrera store who does some business with Emotion.

== Episodes ==
No.	Title	Directed by	Written by	Original release date
1	"Lingerie 101"	Ryūta Ogata	Naoko Adachi	December 1, 2015
Mayuko and her friend Yuri have recently moved to Tokyo. On Mayuko's first day at a new job in a lingerie boutique called Emotion, the staff is busy preparing for an upcoming trunk show, but the owner, Ms. Nanjō, isn't done with the designs yet.
2	"You Are What You Wear"	Ryūta Ogata	Naoko Adachi	December 1, 2015
Mr. Fujimura wants a partnership with Emotion for his department store. Mayuko helps her first customer, but finds she has a lot to learn about customer service.
3	"A Brand New Challenge"	Ryūta Ogata	Naoko Adachi	December 1, 2015
Nanjō agrees to the partnership with Vanderbilt's. Mizuki and Fumika are placed in charge of the effort, and Nanjō challenges Mayuko to decide if she truly wants to stay in the lingerie business. Sarii and Mayuko become friends. Mayuko attends an industry party and is humiliated.
4	"A Change of Pace"	Hiroki Hayama	Naoko Adachi	December 1, 2015
Mayuko begins to dress stylishly. As Mizuki and Fumika are busy managing the new second line, Mayuko and Sōsuke are put in charge of the next trunk show, but Vanderbilt's wants to mass-produce Emotion's goods more than Nanjō is prepared to.
5	"Making My Mark"	Hiroki Hayama	Naoko Adachi	December 1, 2015
Having left Emotion with Fumika to produce their own products at Vanderbilt's, Mizuki has second thoughts when the department store sues Emotion for copyright infringement. Nanjō is forced to cancel the trunk show as Emotion faces bankruptcy, but the store gains an unexpected benefactor.
6	"Marketing Matters"	Hiroki Hayama	Naoko Adachi	December 1, 2015
With the store unable to revive the second line, Mayuko focuses on marketing to increase the store's profile, but learns a dispiriting lesson. Mizuki becomes increasingly disenchanted with Vanderbilt's.
7	"Race to the Top"	Ryūta Ogata	Naoko Adachi	December 1, 2015
Emotion prepares for its first public fashion show, where the second line, designed by Mizuki, will debut. Mayuko produces the show and finds the job to be far more difficult than she expected.
8	"The Runway"	Ryūta Ogata	Naoko Adachi	December 1, 2015
The day of the show has arrived and there are still last-minute problems that must be resolved.
9	"What's Next?"	Ryūta Ogata	Naoko Adachi	December 1, 2015
The employees of Emotion bask in the success of their show and decide to a take a "summer vacation" in the middle of winter. Mayuko comes to a decision about her future.
10	"The Past Is Present"	Hiroki Hayama	Naoko Adachi	December 1, 2015
Secrets about Nanjō's past are revealed and she is reunited with her estranged son.
11	"When the Cat's Away"	Ryūta Ogata	Naoko Adachi	December 1, 2015
Nanjō is asked to make a bustier for her son's fiancée. Mizumi, Saruhashi, and new employee Rin Nakatani attend a conference. The "summer vacation" comes to an end.
12	"Opportunity Knocks"	Hiroki Hayama	Naoko Adachi	December 1, 2015
Mayuko reveals what she was working on during the vacation. Thanks to the success of the show, Japan's leading fashion magazine wants to do a feature on Emotion. The store's history is told. Nanjō ponders retirement.
13	"Out in the Open"	Ryūta Ogata	Naoko Adachi	December 1, 2015
Nanjō changes her mind about Mayuko's prototype, but Mayuko realizes her work does not fit with Emotion's image and decides to leave the company to market her wares on her own, inspiring Nanjō to rededicate herself to her work.
