= Ongakubito =

- 音楽人
- Directed by: Hidetaka Itō
- Screenplay by: Chieko Shimizu; Hidetaka Itō
- Based on: Erina; Aya Mori
- Starring: Kazuma Sano; Mirei Kiritani; Rika Adachi
- Distributed by: Thanks Lab
- Release date: May 15, 2010
- Running time: 89 minutes
- Country: Japan
- Language: Japanese

Ongakubito (音楽人) is a 2010 Japanese romance film directed by Hidetaka Itō who is known for the Fuji TV's variety show Run for Money Tōsōchū. Kazuma Sano and Mirei Kiritani play the lead roles. It was released on May 15, 2010.

== Cast ==
- Kazuma Sano as Aoi Kagami
- Mirei Kiritani as Shion Mizuno
- Yasuhisa Furuhara as Keita Hara
- Rika Adachi as Karen Minami
- Keisuke Kato as Tsubasa Momose
- Naoko Tokuzawa
