= Jin Shirosaki =

Japanese actor (born 1977)

- 城咲 仁
- Born: Junichi Okayama; September 23, 1977 (age 48); Itabashi, Tokyo, Japan
- Occupations: Entertainer, radio personality
- Years active: 2005 -
- Agent: Sun Music
- Height: 1.775 m (5 ft 10 in) (2007)

Junichi Okayama (岡山 純一, Okayama Jun'ichi; born September 23, 1977, in Itabashi, Tokyo, Japan), better known as Jin Shirosaki (城咲 仁, Shirosaki Jin), is a Japanese entertainer and radio personality who is represented by the talent agency, Sun Music.

Shirosaki worked at a host club.

== Biography ==
Shirosaki served as a host of host club Club Ai for five years in Kabukichō, Shinjuku, and appeared on numerous television programs as a charismatic host. He made a name for himself in Japan as a celebrity host and said that at the time, his annual income exceeded 100 million yen. Initially, Shirosaki's professional name was Jin Asaitsuki (浅樹 仁, Asaitsuki Jin).

In early 2005, he suddenly retired as a host and became a tarento the same year. Shirosaki was later contracted by Sun Music and worked mainly on variety show.

On June 21, 2006, he made his singing debut with "Bulldog", together with Masatoshi Sakai, and produced by Four Leaves.

== Filmography ==
=== TV series ===
Year	Title	Network	Notes
	D no Gekijō Unmei no Judge	Fuji TV	
	Pekepon	Fuji TV	
	Quiz! Hexagon II	Fuji TV	
	Nep League	Fuji TV	
2007	P-1 Gold Rush	TVO	
2007	Midtown TV: Jin Shirosaki to Sayaka Isoyama no Kiwame-michi	GyaO	
2008	Midtown TV: Kinema Renaissance a Yashiro	GyaO	
2008	Mecha-Mecha Iketeru!	Fuji TV	
2008	ReachBoys Gintamaō	Sun TV	
	Tetsuko no Heya	TV Asahi	
	Q-sama!!	TV Asahi	
	London Hearts	TV Asahi	
2009	Waratte Iitomo!	Fuji TV	
	King's Brunch	TBS	
	Tokyo Friend Park 2	TBS	
	All-Star Thanksgiving	TBS	
	Utaban	TBS	
	Otameshi Katsu	TV Asahi	
	Oshaberi Cooking	TV Asahi	
	Ikinari! Kogane Densetsu Ichi-kagetsu Ichimanen Seikatsu	TV Asahi	
	Putsu Suma	TV Asahi	
	Tamori Club	TV Asahi	

=== Dramas ===
Year	Title	Role	Network	Notes
2005	Densha Otoko	Charger buyout man	Fuji TV	Episode 2
2005	Kiken na Aneki	Ryosuke Satomi	Fuji TV	
2007	Delicious Gakuin	Yoshinobu Tokudaira	TV Tokyo	
2008	Puzzle	Kazuhisa Tamada	TV Asahi	Episode 2
2009	Maid Deka	Toru Sainoji	TV Asahi	Episode 9
2011	Hanchō: Jinnan-sho Asaka Han Series 4: Seigi no Daishō	Masahiko Kitahara	TBS	Episode 3
2011	Shihō Kyōkan Yoshiko Hotaka	Noboru Sakuma	TV Asahi	
2012	Shiawase no Jikan	Koichi Yanagi	THK	
2012	Tokumei Tantei	Shigeo Kujo	TV Asahi	Episode 7
2013	Kamen Rider Wizard	Akito Kosuda / Argus	TV Asahi	Episodes 34 and 35
2014	Yame Ken no Onna	Shu Kaneko	ABC	

=== Films ===
Year	Title	Role	Notes	Ref.
2006	Haru no Ibasho	Yoshiyuki Ito		
2011	Cool Blue	Akira		
2012	Mentarisuto Hibiki Shō II: Kokoro Kara no Seikan	Kazuma Naruse		
2014	Oneness: Unmei Hikiyose no Kogane Ritsu			
2016	Crayon Shin-chan: Fast Asleep! Dreaming World Big Assault!	Himself		

=== Direct-to-video ===
Year	Title	Role	Notes
2008	Keshigomu-ya	Ryosuke	Lead role
2008	Keshigomu-ya 2	Ryosuke	Lead role
2009	Mukōbuchi 6-kō Rate Ura Mājan Retsuden Zegen-uchi	Fukami	
2013	Mafia Nyakuza 4		
2013	Mafia Nyakuza 6		

=== Stage performances ===
Year	Title	Role	Notes
2005	Hinomaru Restaurant Kaichōban	Yuji Sakaki	
2006	Mama Loves Mambo IV	Hashimoto	Tokyo, Fukuoka, Hiroshima, Osaka, Nagoya
2008	7@dash: Bokura no Jinsei wa Itsumo A Datta		Theater Green
2012	Scalp D Presents: Tabidachi Ashoro Yori		Sogetsu Hall
2012	Stylish Shine!! Vol.3: Snow Princess!		Zenrosai Hall, Space Zero
2013	Kaitai-ya Barashiya: Soko wa Nokoshite Oku yo		Lead role; Ikeburo Theater Green Big Tree Theater
2013	Shinobu's Brain in the Soup Re:make: Pain		Shimokitazawa "Geki" ko Gekijō
2014	Kikaku Engeki Shūdan Bokura Dan Yoshi: PlayAgain Vol.4		Space107
2014	Tambourine Producers Kōen: Koisuru, Priority Seat		Kichioji Thater

=== Radio series ===
Year	Title	Network	Notes
2005	Wanted! Mokuyōbi Jin Shirosaki & Hiroshi Neko	JFN	

=== Advertisements ===
Title	Notes
Suntory Boss "Rainbow Mountain"	
