= Alice Hirose =

Japanese actress (born 1994)

- 広瀬アリス
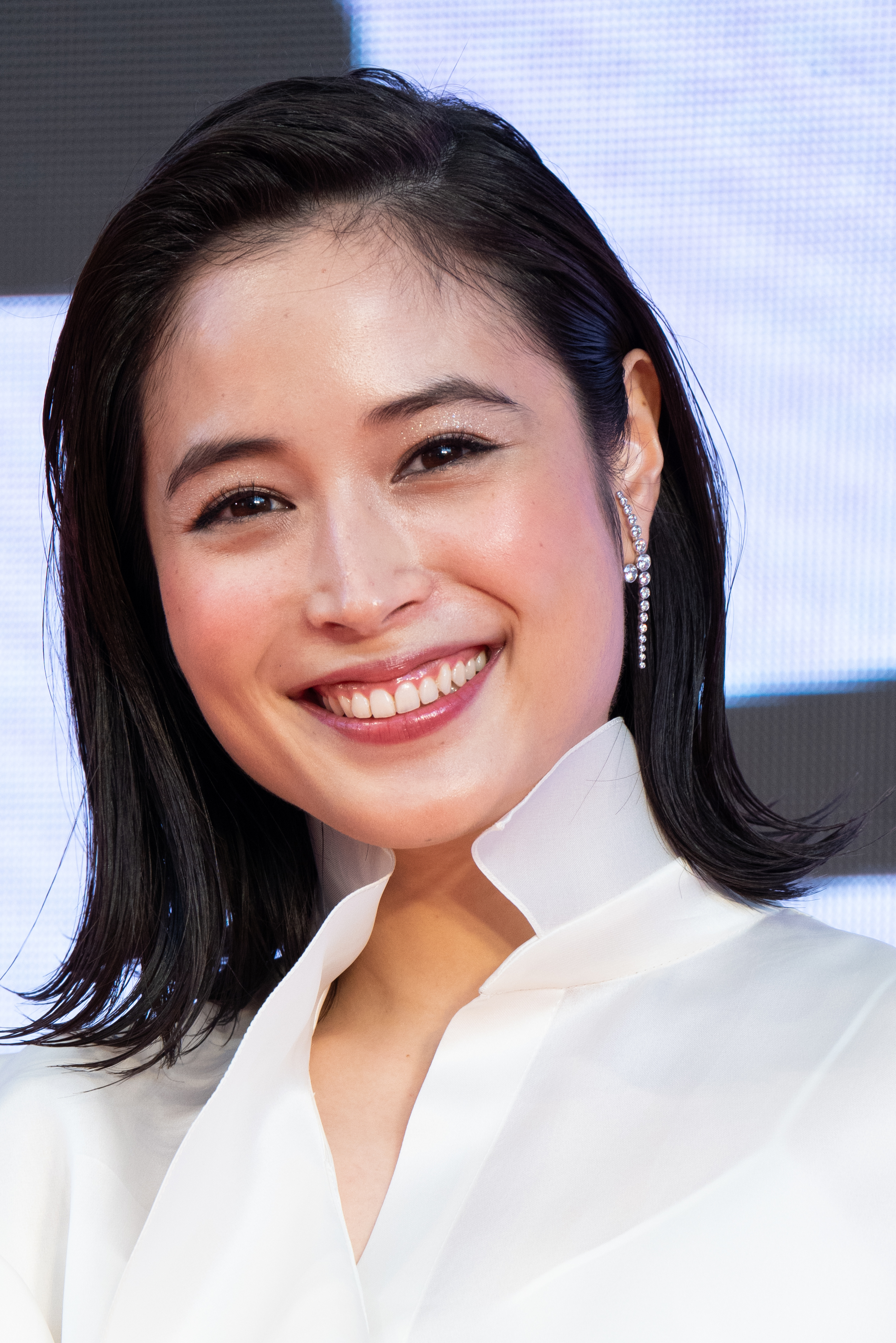
- Hirose at the Tokyo International Film Festival in 2019
- Born: 11 December 1994 (age 31); Shizuoka, Japan
- Other name: Akira Hirose
- Occupation: Actress
- Years active: 2008–present
- Agent: Foster+PLus
- Known for: Silver Spoon
- Height: 1.65 m (5 ft 5 in)
- Relatives: Suzu Hirose (sister)

Alice Hirose (広瀬 アリス, Hirose Arisu; born December 11, 1994) is a Japanese actress and former model. She has a younger sister, Suzu Hirose, who is also a model and actress.

== Biography ==
Hirose was born on December 11, 1994, in the city of Shimizu (now part of Shizuoka City), Shizuoka Prefecture. She is the second of three siblings, with an older brother and a younger sister, actress and model Suzu Hirose.

== Filmography ==
=== Television series ===
Year	Title	Role	Notes	Ref.
2010	Geki Koi: Unmei no Love Story	Kaho Hisanaga		
2010	Seize the Light of Tomorrow	Haruka Sawaguchi		
2011	You Taught Me All the Precious Things	Ryōko Kagawa		
2011	Shin Anata no Shiranai Sekai			
2012	Hōkago wa Mystery to Tomo ni	Naoko Takabayashi		
2012	Answer: Keishichō Kenshō Sōsakan	Rio Yamane	Episode 3	
2012	Miss Double Faced Teacher	Eika Saeki		
2013	AIBOU: Tokyo Detective Duo	Ruriko Tachibana	Season 11; episode 11	
2013	Tada's Do-It-All House		Episode 5	
2013	No Dropping Out: Back to School at 35	Rina Hasegawa		
2013	Jikenya Kagyō	Kaori Kawashima		
2014	Roosevelt Game	Misato Yamazaki		
2014	We Are Already Dead	Rin Akatsuki		
2014	Honto ni Atta Kowai Hanashi			
2014	Tamagawa Kuyakusho of the Dead	Rin Tachibana		
2015	Sachi to Mayu	Mayu		
2015	Mōsō kanojo	Haru		
2017–18	Laugh It Up!	Ririko Hatano	Asadora	
2020	True Horror Stories 2020 (Stain)	Azusa Miura	Lead role; single-episode drama	
2020	7 Secretaries	Nana Terui		
2020	Top Knife	Sachiko Kozukue		
2020	Super Radical Gag Family	Nanako Nagasakiya	Episode 4	
2019–21	Radiation House	Hirono Hirose		
2021	Familiar Wife	Mio Kenzaki	Japanese remake	
2021	Ichikei's Crow: The Criminal Court Judges	Defendant	Cameo	
2022	Heartbroken Meshi	Miki Kimimaru	Lead role	
2022	Who Needs True Love?	Jun Sakurazawa	Lead role	
2023	Marriage Is Difficult for a Ninja	Mio Yamada	Episode 1	
2023	What Will You Do, Ieyasu?	Lady Oai	Taiga drama	
2023	My Second Aoharu	Sayako Shiratama	Lead role	
2024	366 Days	Asuka Yukihira	Lead role	
2024	Completely Innocent	Chisa Matsuoka	Lead role	
2024	AARO: All-Domain Anomaly Resolution Office	Koyume Amano		
2025	The Reluctant Preacher	Shizuka Urumi	Lead role	

=== Films ===
Year	Title	Role	Notes	Ref.
2008	Renai Yakusoku			
2009	Kamen Rider × Kamen Rider W & Decade: Movie War 2010	Yuriko Misaki		
2010	All to the Sea			
2010	Maria-sama ga Miteru	Tsutako Takeshima		
2011	Lost Harmony	Sanae Miyata	Lead role	
2012	Soup: Umarekawari no Monogatari	Hitomi Misaki		
2013	Zekkyō Gakkyū	Rio Takamizawa		
2014	Silver Spoon	Aki Mikage		
2014	Flare	Saki Aikawa		
2016	Seiro no Umi Tantei Mitarai no Jikenbo	Miyuki Ogawa		
2016	L	L	Lead role	
2017	Hyouka: Forbidden Secrets	Eru Chitanda	Lead role	
2018	Miko-girl	Shiwasu	Lead role	
2018	Eating Women	Akari		
2019	Doraemon: Nobita's Chronicle of the Moon Exploration	Luna (voice)		
2020	AI Amok	Kumi Okuse		
2020	Silent Tokyo	Manami Takahashi		
2021	Jigoku no Hanazono: Office Royale	Ran		
2022	Bubble	Makoto (voice)		
2022	Radiation House: The Movie	Hirono Hirose		
2022	7 Secretaries: The Movie	Nana Terui		
2026	New Interpretation of the End of Edo Period	Oryo		
2026	Kill Your Tears, Okiharu	Kyoka Odoriba	Lead role	
2027	AARO: All-Domain Anomaly Resolution Office – The Movie	Koyume Amano		
2027	AARO: All-Domain Anomaly Resolution Office – The Movie 2	Koyume Amano		
2027	Enju	Kimie Yura / Enju Mitsuogi	Lead role	

=== Commercials ===
- Takamiya Gakuen - Yoyogi Seminar (2009-2010)
- Tomy - Love Digi Series (2009-2010)
- Shizuoka Prefecture - Depression and suicide prevention (2010)
- Lotte - Cool Mint Gum (2010-)
- Nissin Foods - Nissin Yakisoba U.F.O. (2011)
- Akagi Nyūgyō - Gatsun, to Mikan (2012)
- Otsuka Foods - Vitamin Carbonated Drink Match (2014-) with Suzu Hirose
- Hoya Corporation - Eyecity (2014)
- Nivea Kaō - 8x4 Deo Water (2015)
- USJ - Resident Evil The Real 3 (2015)
- Arome Bakery

=== Dubbing ===
==== Live-action ====
- Power Rangers (2017), Kimberly Hart/Pink Ranger (Naomi Scott)
- Mission: Impossible – Dead Reckoning Part One (2023), Alanna Mitsopolis/White Widow (Vanessa Kirby)

==== Animation ====
- Toy Story 5 (2026), Lilypad

== Bibliography ==
=== Magazines ===
- Seventeen, Shueisha 1967–, as an exclusive model since 2009

=== Photobook ===
- aBUTTON Vol.2 (September 27, 2011). ISBN 9784891949136.
- Alice (March 16, 2014). ISBN 9784048949422.

== Accolades ==
Year	Award	Category	Nominated work(s)	Result	Ref.
2022	46th Elan d'or Awards	Newcomer of the Year	Herself	Won	
