= Kazuma Sano =

Japanese actor (born 1989)

- 佐野 和真
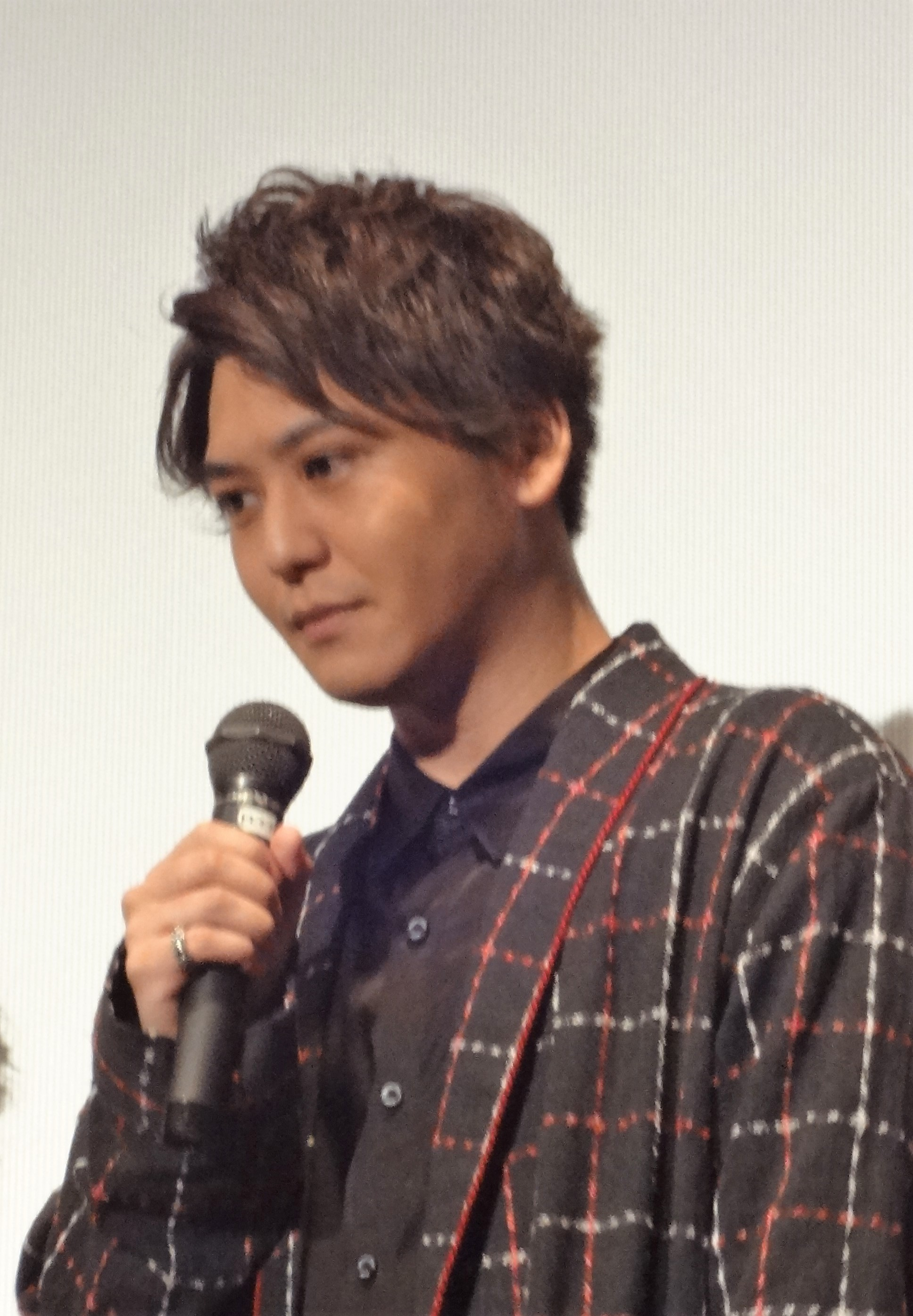
- Born: 28 April 1989 (age 36); Kanagawa Prefecture, Japan
- Occupation: Actor
- Years active: 2005–present
- Notable work: Tokyo Girl; Ongakubito; Gachiban
- Style: television drama; film
- Television: Sand Chronicles; Katagoshi no Koibito; Otomen

Kazuma Sano (佐野 和真, Sano Kazuma; born 28 April 1989, in Kanagawa Prefecture, Japan) is a Japanese actor.

Sano is represented with Stardust Promotion's Section 3.

== Biography ==
While he was in his third-year junior high school, Sano was scouted in Shibuya Station. He is a former member of Stardust Promotion's young actor dance unit Jamming Flow.

In March 2007, Sano appeared in the Tokyo Broadcasting System Ai no Gekijō Sand Chronicles as Daigo Kitamura in his middle school years, and later in July he appeared in the drama Katagoshi no Koibito on the same channel. In January 2008 he opened his official blog "Kaizō Keikaku" with Masataka Kubota. In 2010 Sano's first lead film role was Ongakubito.

== Filmography ==
=== TV drama ===
| Year | Title | Role | Notes | Ref. |
|---|---|---|---|---|
| 2023 | Play It Cool, Guys | Sōta Shiki | | |

=== Films ===
| Year | Title | Role | Notes | Ref. |
|---|---|---|---|---|
| 2015 | Zenkai no Uta | Kenichi Tadano | Lead role | |
| 2019 | Ninkyō Gakuen | | | |
| 2022 | Two Outs Bases Loaded | | | |
| 2024 | 11 Rebels | | | |
| 2025 | The Rightman | | | |
