= Yūichi Nakamura (actor) =

Japanese actor

- 中村 優一
- Born: October 8, 1987 (age 38); Kanagawa Prefecture, Japan
- Occupation: Actor
- Years active: 2003–2012, 2014–present

Yūichi Nakamura (中村 優一, Nakamura Yūichi; born October 8, 1987) is a Japanese actor. He is best known for the roles of Kyōsuke Kiriya in the 2005 tokusatsu series Kamen Rider Hibiki, Otoya Hanazono in the 2006 midnight drama Princess Princess D, and Yuto Sakurai/Kamen Rider Zeronos in the 2007 tokusatsu series Kamen Rider Den-O.

Nakamura was affiliated with the acting group D-Boys produced by Watanabe Entertainment.

In 2012, he announced he would be taking a break from show business, but in 2014 he announced he had been signed to a new talent agency, G-Star.Pro.

== Career ==
Nakamura started his career in entertainment in 2003, joining the talent agency Johnny & Associates under the Johnny's Jr. division. However, through his time in Johnny's Jr., Nakamura realized he had more interest in pursuing a career in acting than in music, despite the passion for dance that motivated him to join the agency. When Watanabe Entertainment's action production group D-Boys announced its first public audition searching for new talents in 2004, Nakamura left Johnny & Associates to try for the new group that conformed more to the career he sought.

On July 27, 2004, Nakamura performed in the D-Boys Open Audition, and came in as the Grand Prize winner. He joined the group shortly after, along with runner-up Shunji Igarashi and third-placer Katsuki Nakamura. Nakamura was one of the constantly-expanding group's longest-standing members.

In March 2010, Nakamura became part of a new D-Boys sub-unit named D-Date alongside Shunji Igarashi, Kōji Seto, Hirofumi Araki and Arata Horii, but had to leave for health reasons and medical treatment. Despite recovering, on September 25, 2012, he resigned from his agency, retiring from the entertainment industry.

He returns to the show business on August 31, 2014.

On December 18, 2022, Nakamura announces his marriage to a non-celebrity woman.

== Filmography ==
=== Television ===
Year	Title	Role	Network
2005	Gokusen 2	Yūichi Kawada	Nippon Television
2005	Daisuki! Itsugo Go!!	n/a	Tokyo Broadcasting System
2005	Kamen Rider Hibiki	Kyosuke Kiriya	TV Asahi
2006	Kitana(i) Hero	Hiroshi Onodera	Nippon Television
2006	Princess Princess D	Otoya Hanazono	TV Asahi
2006	DD-Boys	Himself	TV Asahi
2006	Kazoku Zenzai	Kou Kamizawa	Tokyo Broadcasting System
2007	Puzzle	Masanori Ootaka	TV Asahi
2007	Shinigami no Ballad	Makoto Hayama	TV Tokyo
2007	Delicious Gakuin	Ryouji Nangou	TV Tokyo
2007	Kamen Rider Den-O	Yūto Sakurai/Kamen Rider Zeronos	TV Asahi
2008	Taiyo to Umi no Kyoshitsu	Masayuki Misaki	Fuji Television
2009	Twin Spica	Shū Suzuki	NHK
2009	Last Mail 2	Kazuki Yamada	BS Asahi
2009	The Negotiator	Tomoyuki Miura	TV Asahi
2010	Sunao ni Narenakute	Shu Mizuno	Fuji Television
2010	Jotei Kaoruko	Junpei Kojima	TV Asahi
2010	Moyashimon	Tadayasu Souemon Sawaki	Fuji Television
2019	Kamen Rider Zi-O	Kyosuke Kiriya (later transform to Kamen Rider Hibiki)	TV Asahi
2019	Kamen Rider Zi-O	Yūto Sakurai/Kamen Rider Zeronos	TV Asahi
2025	No.1 Sentai Gozyuger	Gaia Todoroki/GaoRed	TV Asahi

=== Cinema ===
Year	Title	Role	Notes	Ref.
2007	Kamen Rider Den-O: I'm Born!	Yūto Sakurai/Kamen Rider Zeronos		
2008	Kamen Rider Den-O & Kiva: Climax Deka	Yūto Sakurai/Kamen Rider Zeronos		
2008	Saraba Kamen Rider Den-O: Final Countdown	Yūto Sakurai/Kamen Rider Zeronos		
2008	Classmates	Jun Shibahara		
2008	Taiikukan Baby	Jun Shibahara		
2008	Shakariki!	Daisuke Hatomura (Poppo)		
2008	Bokura no Houteishiki	Shinpei Shimokura		
2008	Kaze Ga Tsuyoku Fuiteiru	Akane Kashiwazaki		
2009	Cho Kamen Rider Den-O & Decade Neo Generations: The Onigashima Warship	Yūto Sakurai		
2009	Wangan Midnight	Akio Asakura		
2010	Kamen Rider × Kamen Rider × Kamen Rider The Movie: Cho-Den-O Trilogy	Yūto Sakurai/Kamen Rider Zeronos		
2015	Super Hero Taisen GP: Kamen Rider 3	Yūto Sakurai/Kamen Rider Zeronos		
2016	Humming of Yaeko	Eiji Ishizaki		
2020	Dance, Mita	Mayor Maruyama		
2021	Love and the Grand Tug-of-war			
2022	Ultraman Trigger: Episode Z	Tokioka Ryuichi/Zabil/Evil Trigger (voice)		
2022	1446: An Eternal Minute			
2022	Nagisa ni Saku Hana			
2024	Let It Rain			

== Other media ==
=== Radio ===
- Sunday Talking D-Theater feat. Yuichi Nakamura -I'll always be beside you- (2009)
- D-Boys Be Ambitious (2010)

=== Theatre ===
- Please Me (2005)
- Limit - Anata no monogatari wa nan desu ka? (2005)
- Sophistry (2006)
- Out of Order (2007)
- D-Boys Stage Vol.1: Kanbai Onrei (2007)
- Adult na Onnatachi (2007)
- Aru Hi, Bokura wa Yume no Naka de Deau (2007)
- D-Boys Stage Vol.2: Last Game (2008)
- D-Boys Stage Vol.3: ~Karasu~ 10 (2009)
- D-Boys Stage 2010: Trial-2: Last Game (2010)

=== Voice acting ===
- Kemono no Gotoku Hisoyaka Ni: Kotodama Tsukai drama CD (2007)
- Kamen Rider Battle: Ganbaride video game (2008)
- Bihada Ichizoku anime (2008)
- Kamen Rider: Battride War Genesis video game (2016)

=== Endorsements ===
- Kentucky Fried Chicken: Arigato no Uta (2007)
- Sapporo Beverage: Gerolsteiner (2008)

== Promotional media ==
Nakamura has been featured in the following promotional releases:

=== CDs ===
- Princess Princess D: Character Song Series Vol.2: Shiawase no Yokan - Yuichi Nakamura, Kento Shibuya & Kazuma
- Kamen Rider Den-O: Action-Zero - Yuichi Nakamura & Hōchū Ōtsuka
- Doukyuusei/Taiikukan Baby: Doukyusei,Taiikukan Baby - Yuichi Nakamura
- Bokura no Houteishiki: Futari dake no Happy Birthday -with Bokushiki Member- - Honey L Days with Bokushiki Member
- Kamen Rider Den-O: Action-Zero 2010 - Yuichi Nakamura & Hōchū Ōtsuka

=== DVDs ===
- Princess Princess D: Character Image DVD vol.2 (2006/10)
- Kamen Rider Den-O: I'm Born! making DVD -from the den-liner's window- (2007/07)
- Kamen Rider Den-O: Special Talk Show -close in, all imagin! it's climax!- (2007/11)
- Kamen Rider Den-O: Final Stage and Cast Talk Show (2008/04)
- Boku no Hoteishiki: Actor Nakamura Yuichi (2008/10)
- Kamen Rider Den-O & Kiva: Climax Deka: Collector's pack plus Den-Kiva festival (2008/11)
- D-Boys Boy Friend series vol.2: Yuichi Nakamura Self-Discovery (2009/08)
- Making Of Wangan Midnight The Movie ~Asakura Akio in Akuma no Z~ (2009/08)
- D-Boys Boy Friend series vol.7: 7 HEROES (2010/02)
- Kamen Rider × Kamen Rider × Kamen Rider The Movie: Cho-Den-O Trilogy: Imagin super climax tour 2010 (2010/09)

=== Photobooks ===
- D-Boys: D-Boys (2005/04, ISBN 4-924566-42-X)
- D-Boys: Start! (2006/03, ISBN 4-05-403035-1)
- Official Photo Album Princess Princess D (2006/08, ISBN 4-403-65027-9)
- Princess Princess D Making Book (2006/10, ISBN 4-403-65028-7)
- Kamen Rider Den-O Character Book vol. 01 (2007/08 ISBN 978-4-02-213800-2)
- Den-O Perspective (2008/01 ISBN 978-4-8130-6206-6)
- Kamen Rider Den-O Character Book vol. 02 (2008/03 ISBN 978-4-02-213820-0)
- Yuichi (2008/03 ISBN 978-4-05-403727-4) - solo photobook
- D-Boys in the movie: Shakariki! (2008/08, ISBN 4-8470-4122-4)
- Den-O Final Invitation (2008/09 ISBN 4-7778-0596-4)
- Bokura no Houteishiki: Official Photobook (2008/09 ISBN 4-8130-8012-X)
- D-Boys: Dash! (2008/12, ISBN 4-04-895035-5)
- Den-O Neo Generation!! [+ Decade] (2009/06 ISBN 978-4-7778-0664-5)
- D-Boys: Darling (2010/03 ISBN 978-4-391-13869-6)
- Kamen Rider × Kamen Rider × Kamen Rider The Movie: Cho-Den-O Trilogy: Episode Red Official Guide Book (2010/05 ISBN 978-4-04-885060-5)
- Kamen Rider × Kamen Rider × Kamen Rider The Movie: Cho-Den-O Trilogy: Character Book (2010/06 ISBN 978-4-86336-091-4)
- Kamen Rider × Kamen Rider × Kamen Rider The Movie: Cho-Den-O Trilogy: Complete Book -DEN-O TRILOGIC- (2010/07 ISBN 978-4-7778-0790-1)
- Birth -Standing There- (2010/10, ISBN 978-4-04-895087-9) - solo photobook
