= MidnightPumpkin =

Japanese ska band

midnightPumpkin (ミッドナイト・パンプキン) are a 6-member Japanese ska band formed in 2002. They broke up in 2011, and played their final show on Halloween of that year. Vocalist Wakana is currently working on a solo project, ペパーミント (Peppermint).

== Members ==
- Wakana, vocals.
- Maya, vocals.
- Shinya, drums.
- Hiroki, trumpet.
- Haru, trumpet.
- Aya, saxophone.
- Joe, guitar.
- Yu-ichi, guitar – former member.

== Discography ==
=== Singles ===
- Vega/Crybaby (2006-07-05) - opening theme to the Japanese television drama Princess Princess D.
  1. Vega
  2. Crybaby
  3. sundog
  4. Vega (inst.)
  5. Crybaby (inst.)
- Boys & Girls (2006-10-18)
  1. Boys & Girls
  2. Good Time Girl
  3. Boys & Girls (inst.)
- Hit it! Halloween. (2007-10-31)
  1. Stereo Magic Night
  2. Ghostly Dance Night
- Sora Iro Mirai (ソライロミライ) (2007-11-28) - opening theme to the Japanese television drama Biyo Shonen Celebrity
  1. Sora Iro Mirai (ソライロミライ)
  2. Jewel
  3. Sora Iro Mirai (ソライロミライ)(inst.)
  4. Jewel (inst.)
- I LOVE! I HATE! (2010-04-14)
  1. I LOVE！I HATE！
  2. Chiruchiru Michiru (チルチルミチル)
  3. Jyouhatsu Memory (蒸発メモリー)

=== Albums ===
- Time Limit (2005-10-26)
  1. Time Limit
  2. Workaholic
  3. Foot Step
  4. Heartbraker
  5. Right
  6. Juicy-go-round
- Pop Irony (ポップアイロニー) (2006-11-15)
  1. Boys & Girls
  2. Get back
  3. Daybreak
  4. Rashtail
  5. Trance Border (トランス・ボーダー)
  6. Vega
  7. Peace
  8. Under Control
  9. Americano
  10. Peppermint Sugar
  11. Crybaby
  12. Journey (ジャーニー)
- Slash (2007-04-25)
  1. Yudachi Rhapsody (夕立ちラプソディー)
  2. Rainbow Road
  3. ShangHigh-SKA
  4. Rumble Fish
  5. Have You Never Been Mellow
- Us and U (2009-10-7)
  1. PROLOGUE
  2. Hikari no Story (光のストーリー)
  3. Que・Sera・Sera
  4. Hello My Planet
  5. Angela (アンジェラ)
  6. Shinya Kyoukou Kujirabasu (深夜急行クジラバス)
- Best of Pumpkin ～5th Anniversary～ (2010-7-21)
  1. Stereo Magic Night
  2. TimeLimit
  3. Trance Border (トランス・ボーダー)
  4. Yuudachi Rhapsody (夕立ちラプソディー)
  5. Americano
  6. VEGA
  7. Hikari no Story (光のストーリー)
  8. Rashtail
  9. Ghostly Dance Night
  10. Shinya Kyuukou Kujirabasu (深夜急行クジラバス)
  11. GETBACK
  12. sundog
  13. Sorairo mirai (ソライロミライ)
  14. Jewel
  15. RUMBLE FISH
  16. CRYBABY
  17. JUICY-GO-ROUND
  18. PEPPERMINTSUGAR
  19. BOYS&GIRLS
- Loveratory (2010-7-21)
  1. S.S.C
  2. I LOVE！ I HATE！
  3. MILK CROWN
  4. 20seiki no Koibitotachi (20世紀の恋人たち)
  5. Ame to Kouchya to Nichiyobi (雨と紅茶と日曜日)
  6. SiXTEEN FAN CLUB
  7. Doping Holiday
  8. BLACK HIPSTER
  9. Suihen ni Sakuhana (水辺に咲く花)
  10. swagger
  11. 「I can't」
  12. A.M.L

== Concert tours ==
- M&M Tour
- Time Limit 47min. Tour 2005-2006
- Pop Irony (ポップアイロニー) Tour 2006-2007 (2006-12-19～2007-02-14)
- Slash Tour 2007
