= Princess Princess D =

- Genre: Comedy, Romantic comedy, Drama
- Starring: Kenta Kamakari; Ray Fujita; Takeru Satoh; Yuichi Nakamura; Takumi Saito
- Opening theme: VEGA by midnightPumpkin
- Ending theme: Treasure by Hime (Kenta Kamakari, Ray Fujita & Takeru Satoh)
- Country of origin: Japan
- Original language: Japanese
- No. of episodes: 10

Production
- Running time: Approximately 23 minutes

Original release
- Network: TV Asahi
- Release: 28 June – 13 September 2006

Princess Princess D (プリンセス·プリンセス D, Purinsesu Purinsesu Dī) is a Japanese television drama originally aired by TV Asahi from June to September 2006. The series centers on three high school students involved in their school's cross-dressing princess system, and was loosely based on the manga Princess Princess by Mikiyo Tsuda.

== Plot ==
Fujimori Academy is an elite all-boys boarding school with a unique Princess system: each year three freshmen are chosen to become the school princesses, attending school functions and cheering the clubs and teams dressed as girls to the spirits of the students, who are not able to regularly see girls in the school grounds.

Mikoto Yutaka is one of the chosen for Princess duty in his junior year, along with students Yujiro Shihoudani and Tooru Kouno. At first very contrary to joining the Princess system, Mikoto is eventually convinced by the other Princesses. But just as Mikoto is reluctantly accepting his role, the mysterious Otoya Hanazono transfers into the school. Dissatisfied with the current Princesses' half-hearted efforts and accusing the Student Council of being neglectful of the students' wishes, Otoya creates his own team (the Dark Princesses) to rival the Princesses, and nominates himself candidate for the New School Council.

Mikoto is caught in the fight between Otoya and the current Student Council, unsure of which side to stand for. He also has to deal with his conflicting feelings towards Otoya, and how they affect both his friendship with Yujiro and Tooru and his loyalty to the Princess system. In this process, he comes to understand the true meaning of being a Princess, and finally embraces his role, putting his man's pride aside in favor of the Princesses' pride.

== Cast ==
- Kenta Kamakari as Mikoto Yutaka
- Ray Fujita as Yuujirou Shihoudani
- Takeru Satoh as Touru Kouno
- Yuichi Nakamura as Otoya Hanazono
- Kento Shibuya as Kurou Minamoto
- Kazuma as Ranta Mori
- Takumi Saito as Shuuya Arisada
- Osamu Adachi as Akira Sakamoto
- Hideo Ishiguro as Haruka Kujouin
- Shota Minami as Masayuki Koshino
- Haruhiko Sato as Wataru Harue
- Hiroshi Yoshihara as Takahiro Tadasu
- Kohei Yamamoto as Kaoru Natashou

== Adaptations ==
The live action version of the Princess Princess series differs in many points from its manga and anime counterparts, the most significant changes being the main character and the Black Princesses. In the manga and anime versions, Tooru is the protagonist, while in the drama series the focus is on Mikoto. The Black Princesses were original characters created by the manga author exclusively for the drama version.

The drama also excluded all female characters, including Mikoto's girlfriend. That relationship was exchanged for one heavy on boys love overtones between Mikoto and Otoya.

== Episodes ==
Episode	Title	Original release date
1	"Becoming a Splendid Princess"; Transliteration: "Hime no Kareinaru Ichinichi" (Japanese: 姫君の華麗なる一日)	June 28, 2006
2	"School Targeted - Mystery Exchange Student!"; Transliteration: "Nerawareta Gakuen - Nazo no Tenkōsei!" (Japanese: ねらわれた学園·謎の転校生!)	July 5, 2006
3	"Shock! Black Princess!"; Transliteration: "Shōgeki! Burakku Purinsesu!" (Japanese: 衝撃! プラック·プリンセス!)	July 12, 2006
4	"War With no Honor! Student Council vs. New Student Council!"; Transliteration: "Jingi naki Tatakai! Seitokai vs. Shinseitokai" (Japanese: 仁義なき戦い!生徒会VS新生徒会)	July 19, 2006
5	"Suddenly Getting Closer!? Long Night at the Secret Room"; Transliteration: "Kyūsekkin!? Misshitsu no Nagai Yoru" (Japanese: 急接近!? 密室の長い夜)	July 26, 2006
6	"Princess Split!? ~Season of Disagreement~"; Transliteration: "Hime Bunretsu!? ~Surechigai no Kisetsu~" (Japanese: 姫分裂!? 〜すれ違いの季節〜)	August 9, 2006
7	"Urgent Homecoming! The Best Support Man Haruka Kujōin Arrives!"; Transliteration: "Kinkyū Kikoku! Saikyō no Suketto Kujōin Haruka Tōjō!" (Japanese: 緊急帰国! 最凶の助っ人·九条院ハルカ登場!)	August 16, 2006
8	"Decisive Battle! Election Wars!"; Transliteration: "Kessen! Senkyo Wōzu!" (Japanese: 決戦! 選挙ウォーズ!)	August 24, 2006
9	"Resistance ~Counterattack Song~"; Transliteration: "Rejisutansu ~Hangeki no Uta~" (Japanese: レジスタンス〜反撃の詩〜)	September 6, 2006
10	"Grand Finale!? Fiery School Festival LIVE!"; Transliteration: "Daidanen!? Honō no Gakuensai LIVE!" (Japanese: 大団円!? 炎の学園祭LIVE!)	September 13, 2006

== Media ==
A series of character-related merchandise items was released through the series' original run, including theme songs performed by the actors.

=== Visual ===
- Official Photo Album Princess Princess D

Released August 2006, ISBN 4-403-65027-9

- Princess Princess D Making Book

Released October 2006, ISBN 4-403-65028-7

=== Music ===
- Princess Princess D Character Song Series Vol.1: Treasure - Hime (Kenta Kamakari, Ray Fujita & Takeru Satoh)

1. Treasure
2. Nijiiro no sekai ~Hime no theme~ (虹色の世界〜姫のテーマ〜, Rainbow-colored world ~Princesses Theme~)

- Princess Princess D Character Song Series Vol.2: Shiawase no Yokan - Kurohime (Yuichi Nakamura, Kento Shibuya & Kazuma)

1. Shiawaze no Yokan ~Kurohime no theme~ (幸せの予感〜黒姫のテーマ〜, Feeling of happiness ~Black Princesses Theme~)
2. Toki no kairou ~Otoya no theme~ (幸せの予感〜黒姫のテーマ〜, Gallery of time ~Otoya's Theme~)

- Princess Princess D Character Song Series Vol.3: Hateshinaku sumiwataru sora no mukou mezashite - Kenta Kamakari

1. Hateshinaku cumiwataru sora no mukou mezashite ~Mikoto no theme~ (果てしなく澄み渡る空の向こう目指して〜実琴のテーマ〜, Aiming at the other end of the clear sky ~Mikoto's Theme~)
2. OVER HEAT ~Hime no theme ·Mikoto version~ (OVER HEAT 〜姫のテーマ·実琴バージョン〜, OVER HEAT ~Princesses theme ·Mikoto version~)

- Princess Princess D Character Song Series Vol.4: Raindrops - Ray Fujita

1. Raindrops ~Yujiro no theme~ (Raindrops〜裕史郎のテーマ〜, Raindrops ~Yujiro's Theme~)
2. Don't Stop Flying ~Hime no theme ·Yujiro version~ (Don't Stop Flying〜姫のテーマ·裕史郎バージョン〜, Don't Stop Flying ~Princesses theme ·Yujiro version~)

- Princess Princess D Character Song Series Vol.5: YES! - Takeru Satoh

1. YES! ~Tooru no theme~ (YES!〜亨のテーマ〜, YES! ~Tooru's Theme~)
2. Susume! ~Hime no theme ·Tooru version~ (ススメ!〜姫のテーマ·亨バージョン〜, Improve! ~Princesses theme ·Tooru version~)
