= Shohei Miura =

Japanese actor & model (born 1988)

- 三浦 翔平
- Born: 3 June 1988 (age 38); Tokyo, Japan
- Occupations: Actor, model
- Years active: 2007—present
- Height: 1.81 m (5 ft 11 1/2 in)
- Spouse: Mirei Kiritani (m. 2018)
- Children: 1
- Website: www.shoheimiura.com

Shohei Miura (三浦 翔平, Miura Shōhei; born 3 June 1988) is a Japanese actor and fashion model. He belongs to the talent agency Burning Production.

== Career ==
In 2007, Miura joined the 20th Junon Superboy Contest, and won the Photogenic Award as well as the Ideal Lover Award. Before he won these awards and started as an actor, he had appeared on television variety programs in 2006. He was on TBS's E Musume! four times and a regular on NTV's Good Lookin' Club.

He debuted in 2008 as an actor in the drama series Gokusen 3, and was selected to play the role of one of the main students. He went on to make his debut on the big screen playing the same role in the movie continuation of the drama series, in Gokusen The Movie.

In 2010, he had his first starring role in a stage play titled Samurai 7. It was his first time acting in a stage play.

In 2011, Miura won the Best New Actor Award at the 34th Japan Academy Prize for Umizaru 3: The Last Message.

== Appearances ==
=== TV dramas ===
- Gokusen 3 (2008), Shunsuke Kamiya
- Hanazakari no Kimitachi e 2011 (2011), Shuichi Nakatsu
- Saki (2013), Hayato Nitta
- Angel Heart (2015), Xin-Hong
- A Girl & Three Sweethearts (2016), Chiaki Shibasaki
- Love Begins When the Money Ends (2020), Ken Saotome
- Kyojo (2020), Jun Kusakabe
- Ano Toki Kiss Shite Okeba (2021), Haruto Takamizawa
- Police in a Pod (2021), Seiji Minamoto
- New Nobunaga Chronicle: High School Is a Battlefield (2022), Masamune Date
- Dear Radiance (2024), Fujiwara no Korechika
- Ameku M.D.: Doctor Detective (2025), Yū Takanashi

=== Films ===
- Gokusen The Movie (2009) as Shunsuke Kamiya
- Umizaru 3: The Last Message (2010) as Takuya Hattori
- The Liar and His Lover (2013), Shun Sakaguchi
- Godai - The Wunderkind (2020), Sakamoto Ryōma
- Looking for Magical Doremi (2020), Ryuichi Omiya (voice)
- Usogui: Lie Eater (2022), Ikki Sadakuni
- The Pearl Legacy (2023)
- Kyojo: Reunion (2026), Jun Kusakabe

=== Stage plays ===
- Samurai 7 (2010), Katsushirou
