= Love Like the Falling Petals =

- Poster
- 桜のような僕の恋人
- Directed by: Yoshihiro Fukagawa
- Written by: Tomoko Yoshida
- Based on: Love Like the Falling Petals by Keisuke Uyama
- Produced by: Kei Haruna; Takahiro Kawada
- Starring: Kento Nakajima; Honoka Matsumoto
- Cinematography: Hiro'o Yanagida
- Edited by: Naoya Bando
- Music by: Gorō Itō
- Production company: Toho Studios
- Distributed by: Netflix
- Release date: March 24, 2022
- Running time: 128 minutes
- Country: Japan
- Language: Japanese

Love Like the Falling Petals (Japanese: 桜のような僕の恋人) is a 2022 Japanese romantic drama film directed by Yoshihiro Fukagawa and written by Tomoko Yoshida, based on the 2017 novel of the same name by Keisuke Uyama. It stars Kento Nakajima and Honoka Matsumoto.

== Plot ==
A budding photographer, Haruto, meets a kind, young hairdresser named Misaki. Misaki reveals that he was her very first client, which he finds endearing, and falls in love with her at first sight. Haruto bends the truth and introduces himself as a photographer.

Haruto continues to return to get his hair cut by her, and the two become close. One day, Haruto decides to ask Misaki on a date, bringing up the topic while getting his hair cut. Incidentally, he moves his head and causes Misaki to cut the tip of his earlobe, making him bleed profusely and pass out.

A few days later, a frantic Misaki meets with Haruto to apologize for the injury. He brings up the question of a date, to which she agrees. Misaki's protective older brother does not approve, however, as he only wants what is best for her.

They go on a date to see cherry blossoms, where Haruto reveals that he is not currently a photographer and is at a crossroads. Misaki becomes furious that he stopped pursuing his dream and advises Haruto not give up so easily just because things get hard. Haruto is flabbergasted, but takes her advice seriously, determined to become someone she can be proud of. He gets a job at a photo studio and continues to work hard to prove himself to Misaki. He then asks her out again and she accepts. They have their first date and have such a great time, they start to date more seriously.

Their happy romance comes to a halt, as Misaki falls ill, leading to a doctor's visit where she is diagnosed with progeroid syndromes: a disease that ages her extremely fast, deteriorating her body at an alarming rate. Misaki's case is extreme, leaving her with less than a year to endure the debilitating symptoms.

Misaki, devastated, goes into seclusion and cuts Haruto off. She also quits her hairdresser job, pretending to have found work elsewhere. After a few months of ghosting him, she lies and pretends to have found someone else, breaking his heart.

She is cared for by her brother, who tries everything to cure her, but to no avail. They even try out expensive electromagnetic therapy done by an external clinic that promised results. Unfortunately, the clinic turns out to be a scam taking advantage of vulnerable patients seeking hope.

A few months into the year, Misaki's disease continues to progress rapidly, slowing her bodily functions, and making her lose hope in life. Although heartbroken, Haruto tries to move on from Misaki. He concentrates on his photography and bears the fruits of his efforts, which helps in his journey of healing.

=== Ending ===
In the final act, Misaki initially wishes to see Haruto one last time but later changes her wish to “I want my suffering to end.” During winter, she collapses outside Haruto’s photography studio. Haruto helps her up but fails to recognize her due to her aged appearance, addressing her politely as “ma’am.” Shortly afterward, Misaki dies.

Haruto learns the truth after her cremation and is devastated. He contemplates suicide but ultimately chooses to continue living, channeling his grief into photography. He vows to honor Misaki’s memory every spring, symbolized by the falling petals of cherry blossoms.

=== Themes ===
The ending explores themes of:

- Love and sacrifice: Misaki’s decision to leave Haruto reflects selfless devotion.
- Memory and art: Haruto’s photography becomes a means of preserving their love.
- Impermanence: The falling petals symbolize fleeting beauty and the cycle of life.

=== Post-credit scene ===
A flashback reveals that Haruto and Misaki had unknowingly crossed paths before their official meeting at the hair salon. This suggests that their relationship was guided by fate and implies the possibility of reunion in another life.

== Cast ==
- Kento Nakajima as Haruto Asakura
- Honoka Matsumoto as Misaki Ariake
- Kento Nagayama as Takashi Ariake
- Jun Kaname as Doctor Kamiya
- Mitsuhiro Oikawa as Kyosuke Sawai

== Production ==
The film is based on the novel Sakura no Yona Boku no Koibito by Keisuke Uyama, published in 2017 by Shueisha. It was produced by Kei Haruna and Takahiro Kawada, with cinematography by Hiro'o Yanagida. The project was developed by Toho Studios and distributed worldwide by Netflix.

Filming took place in Japan, with locations chosen to highlight the seasonal beauty of cherry blossoms, which serve as a central motif in the story. The film was released globally on Netflix on March 24, 2022, and runs for 128 minutes.

== Reception ==
The ending was widely discussed for its emotional impact, with critics noting the tragic twist of Haruto not recognizing Misaki in her final moments. The film has been compared to other Japanese romantic tragedies such as Crying Out Love in the Center of the World, emphasizing its place within the genre’s tradition of bittersweet storytelling.
