= Koisuru Vampire =

- Poster
- 恋する♡ヴァンパイア
- Directed by: Mai Suzuki
- Written by: Mai Suzuki
- Screenplay by: Mai Suzuki
- Starring: Mirei Kiritani; Shōta Totsuka; Natsume Mito
- Cinematography: Shūhei Umene
- Edited by: Hitomi Katō
- Music by: Yoshihiro Andō
- Production company: Koisuru Vampire Film Partners
- Distributed by: Phantom Film
- Release date: April 17, 2015 (Japan)
- Running time: 102 minutes
- Country: Japan
- Language: Japanese

Koisuru Vampire (Japanese: 恋する ヴァンパイア; lit. "Vampire in Love") is a 2015 Japanese vampire film directed by Mai Suzuki and starring Mirei Kiritani. It was released on April 17, 2015.

== Plot ==
Kiira seems like an ordinary young girl, who likes to dress up. What differentiates her from others is that she is a vampire. She has never told anyone her secret including her first love, Tetsu. After her parents died when Kiira was 12 years old, she needed to live with her relatives and lost contact with Tetsu. But 8 years later, Tetsu appears at the bakery where Kiira works...

== Cast ==
- Mirei Kiritani as Kiira
- Shōta Totsuka as Tetsu
- Seiichi Tanabe as Rikihiko
- Nene Ōtsuka as Maria
- Mito Natsume as Natsu
- Summer Meng as Miki
- Choi Jin-hyuk as Mike
- Ekin Cheng as Derek
- Akira Emoto as Sōjirō
