= Delicious Gakuin =

- Directed by: Yoshiaki Tago; Kei Horie
- Starring: Takahiro Nishijima; Hiroki Aiba; Ryosuke Miura; Shinjiro Atae; Yuichi Nakamura
- Opening theme: "Kuchibiru kara Romantica" by AAA
- Country of origin: Japan
- No. of episodes: 13

Production
- Producers: Chisui Takigawa; Shinzaburo Fujihira
- Running time: ca 25 minutes

Original release
- Release: April 2 – June 25, 2007

Delicious Gakuin (美味學院, Derishasu Gakuin; translated as Delicious Academy), is a Japanese TV drama.

== Synopsis ==
After being kidnapped and being taken to a cooking school told they must enroll, a group of boys deal with learning tons of recipes while also focusing on thoughts of love, friends, and intentions.

== Cast ==
- Takahiro Nishijima as Rouma Kitasaka
- Hiroki Aiba as Rin Takasugi
- Ryosuke Miura as Matthew Perrier
- Takashi Nagayama as Tsukasa Okita
- Jin Shirosaki as Yoshinobu Tokudaira
- Shinjiro Atae as Shugo Katsuragi
- Hironari Amano as Ken Kodou
- Yuichi Nakamura as Ryuji Nango
- Ryunosuke Kawai as Toshiki Hijikata
