= Hitomi Miyauchi =

Japanese gravure idol and actress (born 1992)

- 宮内ひとみ
- Born: October 17, 1992 (age 33); Izumi, Kagoshima, Japan
- Other name: Nanami Sakuraba (桜庭ななみ)
- Occupations: Actress; gravure idol; singer
- Years active: 2007–present
- Spouse: Unknown (m. 2023)

Hitomi Miyauchi (宮内ひとみ, Hitomi Miyaūchi; born October 17, 1992), is a Japanese gravure idol and actress who won "Miss Magazine 2008". Formerly known by the stage name Nanami Sakuraba, she announced in November 2024 that she would be leaving Sweet Power and continuing her career under her real name.

== Personal life ==
Miyauchi is the middle of three children; she has one older sister and one younger brother. On September 1, 2023, Miyauchi's agency announced her marriage to her non-celebrity husband.

== Filmography ==
=== Drama ===
- Akai Ito (2008), Sara Nakagawa
- Tokyo Girls (2008)
- Nadeshiko Tai (2008), Reiko Torihama
- Ghost Town no Hana (2009), Shiori Yanagawa
- Twin Spica (2009), Asumi Kamogawa
- Koishite Akuma: Vampire Boy (2009), Kaori Takagi
- Boku to Star no 99 Nichi (2011), Namiki Momo
- Last Hope (2013), Maki Tokita
- The Limit (2013), Mizuki Konno
- Miss Pilot (2013), Suzu Abeno
- Silentpoor (2014), Manaka
- Hatashiai (2015), Miya
- Contrail (2016), Keiko
- Segodon (2018), Saigō Koto
- Scarlet (2019–20), Naoko
- 13 (2020), Yuria
- Dreamteam (2021), Akane
- Galápagos (2023)

=== Films ===
- Classmates (2008), Yuki Hayakawa
- Taiikukan Baby (2008), Yuki Hayakawa
- Heaven's bus (2008)
- Akai Ito (2008), Sara Nakagawa
- Summer Wars (2009), Natsuki Shinohara
- Shodo Girls (2010)
- The Last Ronin (2010), Kane
- Sabi Girls Sabi Boys (2011)
- Tengoku Kara no Yell (2011)
- Runway Beat (2011), Mei Tsukamoto
- .hack//The Movie (2012), Yūki Sora (voice)
- The After-Dinner Mysteries (2013)
- The Werewolf Game: The Villagers Side (2013), Airi Nishina
- Attack On Titan (2015), Sasha
- Attack On Titan : End of the World (2015), Sasha
- Trumpetofthe Cliff (2016), Aoi
- Manhunt (2017), Rika
- Our Departures (2018), Yuri Sasaki
- Yakiniku Dragon (2018), Mika
- Midnight Horror: Six Nights Segment: Order (2022), May
- Eternal New Mornings (2023), Megumi Sasaki
- Arrogance and Virtue (2024), Minako
- The Boy and the Dog (2025), Hisako Uchimura
- Mr. Osomatsu: Project Slackers (2026)

=== Video games ===
- Ryu Ga Gotoku Ishin! (2014), Oryo
- The Centennial Case: A Shijima Story (2022), Haruka Kagami

=== Other TV programs ===
- Good-luck music hall (開運音楽堂, Kaiun ongaku dō) (TBS)

=== CM ===
- Softbank Telecom
- Suntoryfoods Nacchan Orange (23 February 2010)
- Lotte Ghana Milk Chocolate (April 19, 2010)
- National Fire Prevention poster campaign in spring (2010)
- Japan Post Bank"Yucho Kazoku"(2010)
- Mitsubishi Estate"Mitsubishi Jisho Wo Mini Ikou"(2010)
- Lawson (2015)
- Izumi Syuzou (2016)

=== Radio ===
- SCHOOL OF LOCK! "GIRLS LOCKS!"(Tokyo FM)

=== Music Videos ===
- Exo's For Life Music Video (Korean and Mandarin Version) (2016)

== Awards and nominations ==
Year	Award ceremony	Category	Nominee / Work	Result	Ref.
2011	53rd Blue Ribbon Awards	Best Newcomer	The Last Ronin and Shodo Girls	Won	
2012	35th Japan Academy Film Prize	Newcomer of the Year	The Last Ronin	Won	
2022	17th Asia Model Awards	Asia Star Award	Herself	Won	
