= Snowflake (2011 film) =

- スノーフレーク
- Directed by: Masaaki Taniguchi
- Screenplay by: Hakaru Yaatara
- Based on: Kozue Ōsaki
- Produced by: Shūsaku Matsuoka
- Starring: Mirei Kiritani; Haru Aoyama
- Cinematography: Syōgo Ueno
- Edited by: Junichi Itō
- Distributed by: Stylejam
- Release date: August 6, 2011
- Running time: 74 minutes
- Country: Japan
- Language: Japanese

Snowflake (スノーフレーク) is a 2011 Japanese romance and mystery film directed by Masaaki Taniguchi who directed Time Traveller: The Girl Who Leapt Through Time in 2010. His directed film Ranhansha was also released on the same day. This film was shot in Hakodate, Hokkaido. In both films, Mirei Kiritani plays the lead role.

== Cast ==
- Mirei Kiritani as Mano
- Haru Aoyama
