= Patisserie Coin de rue =

- Movie poster
- Directed by: Yoshihiro Fukagawa
- Written by: Yoshihiro Fukagawa; Kiyotaka Inagaki; Koko Maeda
- Produced by: Koko Maeda; Hiroshi Otaru; Hiroshi Kogure
- Starring: Yōsuke Eguchi; Yū Aoi; Noriko Eguchi; Hiroyuki Onoue; Urara Awata
- Cinematography: Hikaru Yasuda
- Edited by: Naoya Bando
- Music by: Mamiko Hirai
- Production companies: Itoh Company; Pony Canyon; Alchemy Productions; Tokai Television Broadcasting; Kansai Television
- Distributed by: Asmik Ace Entertainment
- Release date: 11 February 2011 (Japan)
- Running time: 115 minutes
- Country: Japan
- Language: Japanese

Patisserie Coin de rue (Japanese: 洋菓子店コアンドル, Hepburn: Yougashiten Koandoru) is a 2011 Japanese drama film directed by Yoshihiro Fukagawa. It stars Yōsuke Eguchi in the role of Tomura, a legendary patissier who suddenly quits making pâtisserie and becomes a guidebook writer. It also stars Yū Aoi as Natsume, who comes from Kagoshima and moves to Tokyo to find her boyfriend.

Patisserie Coin de rue was released in cinemas in Japan on 11 February 2011.

== Plot ==
Tomura was previously a patissier, but left the industry eight years before the setting of the film and repeatedly declined invitations to work at a pastry shop in Tokyo where he is a regular. Since that time, Tomura has only lectured at culinary schools and written a guidebook for pastry critics.

Meanwhile, Natsume, the daughter of a Kagoshima bakery owner, travels from Kagoshima to Tokyo to find her boyfriend. She looked for a pastry shop named "Patisserie Coin de Rue" because she heard that her boyfriend works there. However, she finds out that he no longer works there, but none of the staff were willing to tell her where he went. She saw a recruitment notice, and she request for a job there until she can find her boyfriend. Initially reluctant to hire her, the store owner Yuriko reluctantly gave in when she saw Natsume's resolve. There, Natsume works with a talented patissier Mariko, who disapproves of Natsume and gives her a hard time.

Later, Natsume discovers that her boyfriend had abandoned her and found another girl. Brokenhearted, she got drunk and staggers back to the patisserie. She decides to continue working at the patisserie despite the fact that she no longer had a boyfriend. She trains under the skilled Yuriko, and her skills gradually got better, to the extent that Yuriko had the confidence to give a sample of her patisserie to a regular customer and the critic Tomura. However, Tomura gives her patisserie a rating of zero.

Natsume started arguing with Tomura, and in the resulting argument, Natsume criticized Tomura's decision to quit pastry-making and become a critic. This made Tomura very angry, and he returned to his home without saying anything. In his house, a flashback ensues, showing Tomura's daughter being knocked down by a car in front of his patisserie. He blames himself for the accident because he was supposed to pick his daughter up from her nursery that day, but he forgot because he was busy preparing pastries for a feast. He stopped making pastries because he did not want to be reminded of the accident again.

Suddenly, just as "Patisserie Coin de Rue" received a huge order to supply patisseries for a party at a French family's party, Yuriko fell down the stairs and broke her arm. As she could not make pastries for three months, she decided to close down the Patisserie Coin de Rue and have to pay a penalty for not honouring her contract. However, Natsume lobbies hard to let her have a chance. She also went to persuade Tomura to take over Yuriko's place, and also convince Mariko to come back to the shop. Together, they produce pastries in time for the party, and their pastries are praised by the people at the party. Later, Natsume receives a scholarship to study patisserie-making at a prestigious American university, the place where Yuriko and Tomura studied. Tomura is also reunited with his wife, whom he was separated from after his daughter's accident.

== Cast ==
- Yōsuke Eguchi as Tomura, a legendary pastry chef who was renowned for his sweets before suddenly dropping out of industry circles.
- Yū Aoi as Natsume, a cake-maker’s daughter who traveled from Kagoshima to Tokyo to chase after a boyfriend and works at a popular Tokyo shop called “Pastry Coin de Rue”.
- Noriko Eguchi as Mariko
- Hiroyuki Onoue
- Urara Awata
- Tomoka Yamaguchi
- Nathan Berg as Julian
- Kyusaku Shimada
- Mariko Kaga
- Mizuho Suzuki
- Sumie Sasaki
- Keiko Toda as Yuriko

== Release ==
Patisserie Coin de rue made its debut in Japanese cinemas on 11 February 2011.

Later, this film was released in Singapore by local film distributor Golden Village Pictures on 11 August 2011. The film was shown as "My Patisserie" in Singaporean cinemas.

== Critical reception ==
Mark Schilling, in a review for The Japan Times, wrote that "Aoi energizes any scene she happens to be in, ... She even mastered the Kagoshima dialect for the role. ... So give her an 'A' for effort — and for making the film at least bearable, if still predictable. ... Fukagawa, who not long ago was making smartly observed, has since settled into a more commercial groove, while losing whatever was distinctive about his directorial personality."

== Awards ==
- 26th Santa Barbara International Film Festival (2011) - Best East Meets West Cinema Award
