= Gyokairui Yamaoka Maiko =

- Poster advertising this film in Japan
- Directed by: Ryūtarō Kajino
- Written by: Ryutaro Kajino
- Screenplay by: Ryūtarō Kajino
- Produced by: Hajime Kuboki
- Starring: Uki Satake; Cokoro Takami; Miho Matsushita
- Cinematography: Masaki Nishioka
- Music by: Yoshiyuki Ohi
- Distributed by: Media Magic Film
- Release date: October 22, 2011 (Japan)
- Running time: 82 minutes
- Country: Japan
- Language: Japanese

Gyokairui Yamaoka Maiko (魚介類 山岡マイコ) is a 2011 Japanese fantasy film. The film was directed by Ryūtarō Kajino, and it stars idols Uki Satake and Cocoro Takami.

Gyokairui Yamaoka Maiko made its international debut at the 2011 Yubari International Film Festival. It was subsequently released in Japanese cinemas on 22 October 2011.

== Plot ==
One day, while picking up seashells along the beach, Kamoka spots a girl sprouting out of the water. The girl introduces herself as Maiko. And although this girl is dressed in a high school uniform and looks like a human, she is a type of fish. In the end, Kamoka takes Maiko back to her home.

Over time, the friendship between Kamoka and Maiko deepens. The pair was invited for dinner at Mochiro's home. At first, Kamoka had the wrong impression that Mochiro had romantic feelings towards Maiko. She later finds out that Mochiro was actually scheming to cook Maiko into fine cuisine dish. At the same time, Maiko starts to have a sudden transformation.

== Cast ==
- Uki Satake as Maiko Yamaoka
- Cocoro Takami as Kamoko Negino
- Miho Matsushita as Yukaka Yamaoka
- Sayaka Kato as Koharu
- Takanori Shimomura as Dr. Billy
- Nobuhiko Okamoto as Kanikou
- Kota Fukihara
- Tsunekichi Takeoka
- Akakabuto Masuda
- Yuki Saisho
