= Mirei Kiritani =

Japanese actress, model, and news anchor (born 1989)

- 桐谷 美玲
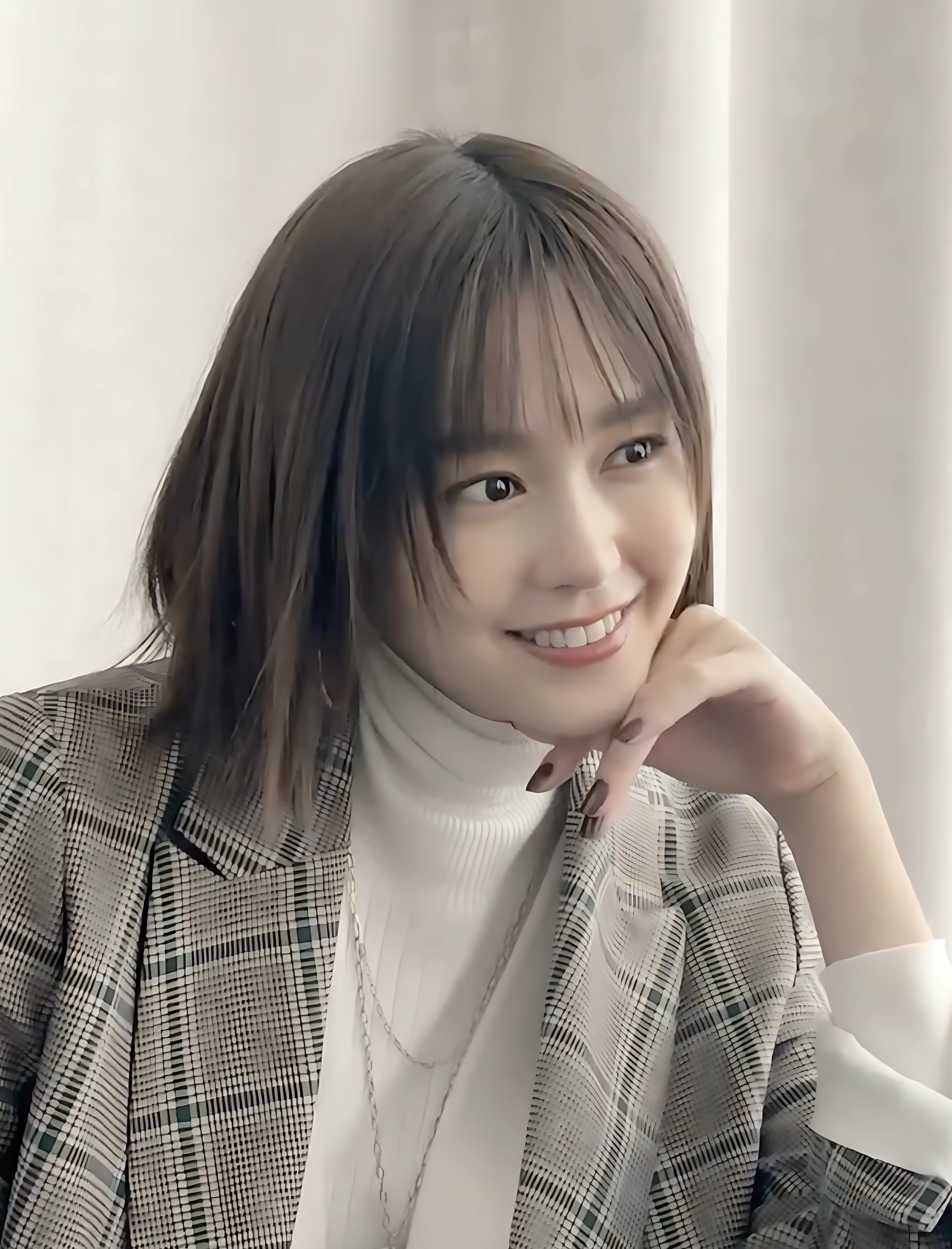
- Kiritani in 2022
- Born: December 16, 1989 (age 36); Chiba Prefecture, Japan
- Occupations: Actress; model; news anchor
- Years active: 2006–present
- Spouse: Shohei Miura (m. 2018)
- Children: 1

Mirei Kiritani (桐谷 美玲, Kiritani Mirei; born December 16, 1989) is a Japanese actress, model, and news anchor. She is best known for her roles in the films Kimi ni Todoke (2010), Usagi Drop (2011), Arakawa Under the Bridge (2012), Crying 100 Times: Every Raindrop Falls (2013), Jossy's (2014), Koisuru Vampire (2015), No Longer Heroine (2015), and Revenge Girl (2017), as well as television series Andō Lloyd: A.I. knows Love? (2013), Gunshi Kanbei (2014), Hell Teacher Nūbē (2014), Atelier (2015), and A Girl & Three Sweethearts (2016).

From 2012 to 2018, she served as an anchor for NTV's news program News Zero every Tuesday. She was previously signed under Sweet Power, but has since left the agency and now works as a free agent. She is currently a news anchor on NTV's News Every.

== Early life and education ==
Kiritani was born on December 16, 1989 in Chiba Prefecture, Japan. Her mother is originally from Hokkaido, while her father is from Fukuoka Prefecture, where she would frequently visit her grandparents' house as a child. She has a younger brother.

She moved to Takatsuki, Osaka Prefecture in fifth grade and lived there until her second year of junior high school. She recalls feeling gloomy while living in Chiba and that she suddenly became more cheerful after moving to Osaka. Due to this, people around her were surprised when her family moved back to Chiba.

She attended Chiba Higashi High School. For half of her high school years, she served as manager of the rugby club.

She then went on to study at Ferris University. After taking a two-year break due to her busy work schedule, she graduated in March 2015 after seven years of study. She later revealed of her decision to attend university, "I went to university because I wasn't confident that I could make a living solely from this job...In the end, I'm glad I went to university. It was fun."

== Career ==
In 2005, while she was a freshman in high school, Kiritani was scouted by Sweet Power via a phone call at her home as "Chiba's number one beautiful girl".

She made her official on-screen debut in the film Haru no Ibasho, which was released in February 2006. She then appeared in TV Asahi's drama series Kisshō Tennyo, and subsequently in the BS-i shows Tokyo Girl and Kaidan Shin Mimibukuro. During this time, she became an exclusive model for Seventeen, a fashion magazine targeted towards teenage girls, from its April 16th issue. From October of the same year, she became a regular in the "Hayamimi Trend No.1" segment of Mezamashi TV.

In 2010, Kiritani played her first lead role in the film Ongakubito and subsequently her first lead role in a television drama in TV Asahi's Jotei Kaoruko. In 2011, she starred in her first mystery films Scattered Reflection and Snowflake. On August 31, 2011, she graduated from the fashion magazine Seventeen after five and a half years as an exclusive model. In September, she was featured in the MBS documentary program Jonetsu Tairiku.

In 2012, she played unique roles in the films Arakawa Under the Bridge and Ace Attorney, which were both released in February of that year.

Kiritani served as the Tuesday anchor for NTV's news program News Zero for six and a half years, from April 2012 until September 25, 2018. In addition to providing in-studio commentary, she was also in charge of her own signature corner "Mirei Kiritani: My Generation", where she personally covered and reported on a variety of topics, such as hot topics among young people of her age and people who are making a name for themselves.

On April 20, 2015, Kiritani graduated as a regular model for the magazine Non-no in its June 2015 issue, which she announced on her blog. She would continue to model for other fashion magazines, such as GINGER and BAILA. That same year, she starred in the original TV series Atelier, produced in collaboration with Fuji Television and American video streaming service, Netflix. On October 6, 2015, she won the Entertainment Industry Category – Female award at the 28th Japan Glasses Best Dresser Awards.

In 2016, Kiritani had her first starring role in a Fuji TV Monday 9pm drama in A Girl & Three Sweethearts, which aired from July 11 to September 19, 2016. On December 19, 2016, she was selected as the "Most Beautiful Face of 2016" by Kodansha's beauty magazine VoCE.

On March 7, 2022, it was announced that after 16 years, Kiritani would be leaving her agency Sweet Power at the end of the month. It was also revealed that after leaving her agency, she would continue her activities as a free agent and primarily work as a model. In July 2022, she made her first public appearance at an event since giving birth to her first child.

On March 12, 2024, it was announced that Kiritani would be joining NTV's information program News Every as a news anchor. She is in charge of reporting on Wednesdays and Thursdays. Her first broadcast appearance was originally scheduled for March 27, but due to poor health, she made her first appearance on April 3.

== Personal life ==
=== Marriage ===
Kiritani met actor Shohei Miura in 2016 after co-starring in the drama A Girl & Three Sweethearts. The two began dating in early 2017 and after dating for about a year and a half, they registered their marriage on July 24, 2018. The following day, on July 25, the couple publicly announced their marriage in a joint statement through Kiritani's agency. The wedding ceremony took place in Hawaii on December 16, 2018, the day of Kiritani's 29th birthday, and the reception was later held at a hotel in Tokyo on December 23.

On February 4, 2020, Kiritani announced via Instagram that she was pregnant with the couple's first child. On July 6, 2020, she announced on her Instagram that she had given birth to her first child, a boy.

== Filmography ==
=== Film ===
Year	Title	Role	Notes	Ref.
2006	Haru no Ibasho	Aoyama		
2007	Akai Bunka Jutaku no Hatsuko	Yamaguchi		
2008	Classmates	Nozomi Hayakawa	Lead role	
2008	Gymnasium Baby	Nozomi Hayakawa		
2009	Yamagata Scream	Chūko Kaburagi		
2010	From Me to You	Ume Kurumizawa		
2010	Ongakubito	Shion Mizuno	Lead role	
2010	Memoirs of a Teenage Amnesiac	Yumi		
2011	Gene Waltz	Yumi Aoi		
2011	Runway Beat	Miki Tachibana		
2011	Scattered Reflection	Shima Kase	Lead role	
2011	Snowflake	Mano	Lead role	
2011	Bunny Drop	Kazumi Kawachi		
2012	Arakawa Under the Bridge	Nino		
2012	Ace Attorney	Mayoi Ayasato (Maya Fey)		
2012	Until the Break of Dawn	Kirari Hinata		
2012	I Have to Buy New Shoes	Suzume Yagami		
2012	Detective Conan: The Eleventh Striker	Kaoru Kouda (voice)		
2013	Crying 100 Times: Every Raindrop Falls	Yoshimi Sawamura	Lead role	
2013	Asa Hiru Ban	Yumiko		
2014	Team Batista The Movie: The Portrait of Kerberos	Youko Bekku		
2014	Jossy's	Naoko Akagi/Red	Lead role	
2015	Assassination Classroom	Aguri Yukimura		
2015	Vampire in Love	Kiira	Lead role	
2015	No Longer Heroine	Hatori Matsuzaki	Lead role	
2016	Assassination Classroom: Graduation	Aguri Yukimura		
2017	Revenge Girl	Miki Takaraishi	Lead role	
2023	Go! Anpanman: Roborii and the Warming Present	Roborii (voice)		
2023	Once Upon a Crime	Wizard Tekla		

=== Television series ===
Year	Title	Role	Notes	Ref.
2006	Kisshō Tennyo	Yuiko Asai		
2006	Kaidan Shin Mimibukuro	Rin Satō	Lead role; season 5	
2006	Tokyo Girl	Kazue	Lead role; episode 4	
2006	Honkowa: True Horror Stories: Summer 2006	Minako Nagasawa		
2006	Koi Suru Nichiyōbi: New Type	Kanako Morie	Episode 6	
2007	Koi Suru Nichiyōbi: Third Series	Natsuki Sannomiya	Lead role; episode 4	
2007	Kaze no Kitamichi	Fumie Shiraishi		
2007	Kira Kira Kenshūi	Kana Fujino	Episode 7	
2007	Hana-Kimi	Kanna Amagasaki		
2007	Deru Toko Demasho!	Mariko Fujino	Television film	
2008	Dansou no Reijin: Kawashima Yoshiko no Shōgai	Fumiyo Wakisaka	Television film	
2009	Chance!: Kanojo ga Seikou Shita Riyū	Arisa Ebihara		
2009	33 Minute Detective 2	Kimi Kurayoshi	Episode 11	
2009	Love Game	Honami Ōtsuka	Episode 9	
2009	Otomen	Miyabi Oharida		
2010	Ringetsu no Musume	Chizuru Mano	Lead role	
2010	Jotei Kaoruko	Saya Nishimura	Lead role	
2010	Natsu no Koi ha Nijiiro ni Kagayaku	Sakura Miyase		
2011	The Music Show	Kaoru Yamazaki		
2011	Arakawa Under the Bridge	Nino		
2011	Hunter: Women After Reward Money	Jun Motomura		
2012	13-sai no Hellowork	Shōko Mano		
2012	GTO: Aki mo Oni Abare Special	Shinomi Fujisaki	Television film	
2012	Shinikare	Ruriko Enomoto		
2013	Apoyan	Haruko Morio		
2013	Cheap Flight	Yūka Kuramochi		
2013	Galileo	Wakana Isogai/Haruna Mikami	Season 2, episode 5	
2013	Saitō San 2	Maya Yamauchi		
2013	Andō Lloyd: A.I. knows Love?	Mysterious Beautiful Girl		
2014	Gunshi Kanbei	Dashi	Taiga drama	
2014	Shinigami-kun	Death's Watcher		
2014	Tsui no Sumika	Tomoko Asakura	Lead role; miniseries	
2014	Hell Teacher Nūbē	Ritsuko Takahashi		
2014	Honkowa: True Horror Stories: 15th Anniversary Special	Risa Takimoto	Lead role	
2016	Sumika Sumire	Sumire Kisaragi	Lead role	
2016	A Girl & Three Sweethearts	Misaki Sakurai	Lead role	
2017	It's All About the Looks	Jun Jonouchi	Lead role	

=== Web series ===
Year	Title	Role	Notes	Ref.
2008	Teddy Bear	Haruna Suzuki		
2015	Atelier	Mayuko Tokita		

=== Television shows ===
Year	Title	Role	Notes	Ref.
2006–2007	Mezamashi TV		Fuji TV "Hayamimi Trend No.1" segment	
2009–2010	Gekimote! Seventeen Gakuen	MC	BS-TBS	
2012–2018	News Zero	News Anchor on Tuesday	NTV	
2024–present	News Every	News Anchor	NTV Wednesdays and Thursdays	

=== Music video appearances ===
Year	Title	Artist	Ref.
2009	"Kakera"	Hiiragi	
2010	"Itoshi Sugite duet with Tiara"	KG	

=== Dubbing ===
Year	Title	Role	Notes	Ref.
2010	Kinyō Road Show!: Twilight	Bella Swan	NTV	

=== Video games ===
Year	Title	Role	Notes	Ref.
2015	Professor Layton vs. Phoenix Wright: Ace Attorney	Maya Fey/Mayoi Ayasato	Nintendo 3DS	
2015	Dragon Quest Heroes: Yamiryuu to Sekaiju no Shiro	Meer	PlayStation 3, PlayStation 4	

=== Radio ===
- Bunka Hōsō Recommen: "Kiritani Mirei no Radio-san." (April 6, 2010 – March 25, 2015, on Wednesday)

== Stage ==
=== Theatre ===
Year	Title		Role	Venue	Date	Ref.
Year	English	Japanese	Role	Venue	Date	Ref.
2012	Shin Bakumatsu Junjōden	新・幕末純情伝	Sōji Okita	Theatre Cocoon, Shibuya	July 12, 2012 – July 22, 2012	
2013	Hiryūden 21: Satsuriku no Aki	飛龍伝21 〜殺戮の秋	Michiko Kanbayashi	Aoyama Theatre	October 5, 2013 – October 20, 2013	

== Bibliography ==
=== Books ===
Year	Title	Publisher	Date Published	ISBN	Ref.
2009	Mirei San no Seikatsu.	Shueisha	August 18, 2009	ISBN 9784087805352	
2011	Mirei San no Seikatsu. super!	Shueisha	January 28, 2011	ISBN 9784087805932	

=== Photobooks ===
Year	Title	Publisher	Date Published	ISBN	Ref.
2011	Cinema×Kiritani Mirei Making of "Ranhansha and Snow Flake"	Kadokawa Group Publishing	July 29, 2011	ISBN 9784046214188	
2012	Kiritani Mirei 2013 Calendar Photobook	Shueisha	October 12, 2012	ISBN 9784081021505	
2014	First Shasinshū "Shitsuren, Ryokō, Paris."	Kodansha	December 11, 2014	ISBN 9784062191494	

=== Magazines ===
- Seventeen, Shueisha (1967–present), as an exclusive model from April 2006 to December 2011
- Non-no, Shueisha (1971–present), as a regular model from March 2012 to June 2015

== Discography ==
=== Singles ===
- Sweet&Bitter (EPIC Records Japan, July 27, 2011)

== Awards ==
- Nail Queen 2014 (Actress Category)
