= Lost Harmony =

- Directed by: Toki Yoshimasa
- Starring: Alice Hirose; Ayako Yoshitani; Mitsuki Takahata; Tanaka Miharu; Erika Yanagita
- Release date: December 3, 2011 (Japan)
- Running time: 87 minutes
- Country: Japan
- Language: Japanese

Lost Harmony is a 2011 Japanese horror film directed by Toki Yoshimasa and starring Alice Hirose.

== Cast ==
- Alice Hirose as Sanae Miyata
- Ayako Yoshitani as Kaori Kubo
- Mitsuki Takahata as Maki Kamimura
- Tanaka Miharu as Shizuru Kamei
- Erika Yanagita as Nanami Saigō
