= A Girl & Three Sweethearts =

- Also known as: A Girl & Three Sweethearts
- Sukina Hito ga Iru Koto
- Genre: Romance; Comedy; Drama
- Written by: Sayaka Kuwamura
- Directed by: Hiro Kanai; Ryo Tanaka; Tomonobu Moriwaki
- Starring: Mirei Kiritani; Kento Yamazaki; Shohei Miura; Shūhei Nomura
- Opening theme: Suki na Hito ga Iru Koto by JY
- Country of origin: Japan
- Original language: Japanese
- No. of episodes: 10

Production
- Producer: Ryota Fujino
- Running time: 45 minutes Mondays at 21:00 (JST)
- Production company: Fuji Television Drama Production Center

Original release
- Network: Fuji Television
- Release: July 11 – September 19, 2016

A Girl & Three Sweethearts, known as Suki na Hito ga Iru Koto (好きな人がいること) in Japan, is a 2016 Japanese television drama, starring Mirei Kiritani, Kento Yamazaki, Shohei Miura and Shūhei Nomura. It aired on every Monday at 21:00 (JST) on Fuji Television beginning July 11, 2016 and ending on September 19, 2016.

== Cast ==
- Mirei Kiritani as Misaki Sakurai
  - A hardworking patissier who just got laid off, she bumps into her old crush Chiaki Shibasaki and ends up working for his family restaurant Sea Sons while moving in with him and his two brothers.
- Kento Yamazaki as Kanata Shibasaki
  - The second Shibasaki brother, head chef of Sea Sons. He is very stoic, but his culinary skills are well-known. His half-sister is Manami Nishijima.
- Shohei Miura as Chiaki Shibasaki
  - The eldest Shibasaki brother and Misaki's old crush. He owns and operates several restaurants including Sea Sons, the restaurant passed down to him and his brothers from his father after he died. He used to date Kaede Takatsuki, but they broke up after she moved away to study abroad in Boston. He hides many secrets in hopes to protect his family.
- Shūhei Nomura as Touma Shibasaki
  - The youngest Shibasaki brother, a free spirit and womanizer. He quits culinary school without telling his brothers and questions what to do with his life.
- Sakurako Ohara as Manami Nishijima
  - Kanata's half-sister. Her mother is suffering from a rare disease.
- Kenta Hamano as Nobuyuki Himura
  - Chiaki's good friend from college.
- Hinako Sano as Mikako Okuda
  - Nobuyuki's girlfriend.
- Marie Iitoyo as Fuka Ninomiya
  - Touma's girlfriend. She is concerned about Touma's welfare.
- Nanao as Kaede Takatsuki
  - Chiaki's ex-girlfriend and aspiring pianist. She has a complicated past she hides from Chiaki so he won't get hurt, but still loves him.
- Kōtarō Yoshida as Ryo Higashimura
  - Head of a major restaurant chain, he wants to take over Sea Sons from the Shibasaki brothers and he's not afraid of using nefarious means to do so.

== Episodes ==
Episode	Original air date	Episode title	Romanized title	English title	Director	Ratings (%)	Notes
1	July 11, 2016	最高の再会、最低の出会い	Saikō no saikai, saitei no deai	Best of reunion, the lowest of the encounter	Hiro Kanai		
2	July 18, 2016	最高のご褒美	Saikō no go hōbi	Best reward	Hiro Kanai	10.4%	
3	July 25, 2016	好きです	Sukidesu	I like it	Hiro Kanai	8.7%	
4	August 1, 2016	つのる想い	Tsunoru Omoi	Thought to raise	Hiro Kanai	9.5%	Shuhei Nomura, Kenta Hamano, Miami D has also appeared in the sub-audio
5	August 8, 2016	告白	Kokuhaku	Confessions	Hiro Kanai	8.4%	
6	August 15, 2016	彼の真実	Kare no shinjitsu	His truth	Hiro Kanai	8.3%	Miura Shohei & Shuhei Nomura appeared in the sub-audio
7	August 29, 2016	君の傍にいたい	Kimi no hata ni itai	I want to be your neighbor	Hiro Kanai	8.2%	
8	September 5, 2016	運命の夜	Unmei no yoru	Fateful night	Hiro Kanai	7.7%	
9	September 12, 2016	KISS	KISS	Kiss	Hiro Kanai	9.4%	Mirei Kiritani, Kento Yamazaki and Ryota Fujino producer also appeared in the sub-audio project
10	September 19, 2016	それだけ。	Sore dake	That's all	Hiro Kanai	8.4%	

== Remark ==
- Episode 7 was not aired on Monday, August 22, 2016, due to broadcast of the 2016 Summer Olympics in Rio de Janeiro, Brazil (7:00 p.m. to 9:54 p.m. Japan consortium program). This episode was scheduled to be aired on Monday August 29, 2016

== International broadcast ==
In Indonesia, Myanmar, Singapore, Thailand, Sri Lanka, Vietnam and Mongolia, the drama is broadcast on WakuWaku Japan with a variety of subtitles under the title, A Girl and Three Sweethearts.

Preceded by Love Song; April 11, 2016 – June 13, 2016	Fuji TV Monday Dramas; Mondays 21:00 – 21:54 (JST)	Succeeded by Cain and Abel; October 17, 2016 – 2016
