= Hiroki (singer) =

Japanese singer-songwriter

Hiroki 紘毅
- Born: Hiroki Maekawa (前川 紘毅); November 9, 1985 (age 40); Setagaya, Tokyo, Japan
- Genres: J-pop
- Occupation: Singer-songwriter
- Instruments: Guitar, piano
- Years active: 2006–present
- Label: J-more
- Website: Official website

Hiroki Maekawa (前川 紘毅, Maekawa Hiroki; born 9 November 1985, in Setagaya, Tokyo, Japan), known professionally as Hiroki (紘毅), is a Japanese singer-songwriter. He dropped out from Shobi University. He is represented by Avex Vanguard.

== Discography ==
=== Singles ===
| Year | Title | Ref. |
| 2006 | "Kaede" | |
| 2007 | "Futago-dama" | |
| 2009 | "Kimi no Inai Hidarigawa" | |
| 2009 | "8 mili Video" | |
| 2011 | "Boku no Chokin-bako" | |
| 2011 | "Himitsu Kichi" | |
| 2012 | "Kimi ga Daisuki de feat. Shinjiro Atae (AAA) / Do Wak Parappa" | |
| 2012 | "Me o Tojite" | |
| 2012 | "Umarekawatte mo Boku de ī yo / Tomodachi" | |

=== Unreleased ===
| Year | Title | Notes |
|---|---|---|
| 2009 | "Itsunomanika Hare" | Tokyo Mayokara! theme song in 2009 |

=== Others ===
| Year | Title | Notes |
|---|---|---|
| 2009 | "Beautiful Days" | Youjeen cover; used in P&G Pantene Kirei no Project advertisement |

=== Tie-ups ===
| Title | Tie-up |
|---|---|
| "Kaede" | Shinkeishitsu Variety: Shinpai-san ending theme; Ikari Oyaji 3 ending theme |
| "Futago-dama" | Private Lesson: Tadashī Akiko Wada no Tsukurikata opening theme |
| "Kimi no Inai Hidarigawa" | Music Fighter "Power Play" theme in February 2009 |
| "Ashita e no Michi" | Tokyo Mayokara! theme song in 2008 |
| "Mamorubeki Hito" | Appeared Koi Shigure in September 2009 |
| "Boku no Chokin-bako" | Little Battlers Experience ending theme for episodes 1 to 24 |
| "Himitsu Kichi" | Little Battlers Experience ending theme for episodes 25 to 44 |
| "Do Wak Parappa" | Little Battlers Experience W ending theme for episodes 1 to 16 |
| "Ai ni Ikou!" | Little Battlers Experience: Boost ending theme; Little Battlers Experience: Baku Boost ending theme |
| "Me o Tojite" | Little Battlers Experience W ending theme for episodes 17 to 34 and 58 |
| "Nichiyōbi" | Kiyoshi Maekawa no Egao Manten Tabizuki ending theme |
| "Umarekawatte mo Boku de ī yo" | Little Battlers Experience W ending theme for episodes 35 to 45 |
| "Do Wak Parappa" | Little Battlers Experience W ending theme; Little Battlers Experience W: Chō Custom ending theme |

== Filmography ==
=== Radio ===
| Year | Title | Network |
|---|---|---|
| 2009 | Hadaka no Hiroking! | Bay FM |
| 2015 | Hiroki no "Nichiyōbi wa Utakōki" | Cross FM |
| 2015 | Pao~n | KBC Radio |

=== TV series ===
| Year | Title | Network | Notes |
|---|---|---|---|
| 2009 | Dancing Sanma Palace | NTV | Guest with his father Kiyoshi Maekawa |
| 2009 | Inaka ni Tomarou! | TV Tokyo | |
| | Uta no Rakuen | TV Tokyo | |
| 2010 | Konya mo Doru Bako!! EX | TV Tokyo | Guest with Marika Aoi |
| 2013 | Kiyoshi Maekawa no Egao Manten Tabizuki | KBC | Guest |
| 2014 | Umi Kara no Nihon Zekkei! Ryoshi-san to Iku Pukapuka Funatabi: Miwaku no Notohantō o Meguru | BS-TBS | Traveler |

=== TV drama ===
| Year | Title | Role | Network | Notes |
|---|---|---|---|---|
| 2011 | Hancho – Jinnan-sho Asaka Han − Series 4 − Seigi no Daisho | Yukio Miwa | TBS | Episode 8 |

=== Stage ===
| Year | Title | Role |
|---|---|---|
| 2011 | Shinshun Sengoku Nabe-sai: Anmari Chikazuki Sugiru to Kira re Chau yo | Ōtani Yoshitsugu |
| 2012 | Hokorashigedaga, Sora | Tokita |
| 2012 | Yukinojo Ichiza – Sanjō Kōen Rock Opera: Psychedelic Pane | Jun |
| 2013 | Dream Jumbo Takara bu ne: Kesshite o Togame Kudasaimasu na | Saigō Takamori |
| 2014 | Ai no Uta o Utaou | |
| 2014 | Sei Meiji: Zaru no Saiten – Anmari Kaburu to Okora re Chau yo | Gnecchi-Soldo Organtino |

=== Films ===
| Year | Title | Role |
|---|---|---|
| 2009 | Ramune | Daikoku |
| 2013 | Hitomi o Tojite | Takayuki |
