= Seventeen (Japanese magazine) =

Japanese fashion magazine

- Cover of the February 2010 issue, featuring Mirei Kiritani
- Categories: Fashion
- Frequency: Quarterly
- Circulation: 327,334 (2008)
- Publisher: Shueisha
- First issue: 1967
- Country: Japan
- Language: Japanese
- Website: seventeen-web.jp

Seventeen (Japanese: セブンティーン, Hepburn: Sebuntīn) is a quarterly Japanese fashion magazine aimed at female teenagers. The magazine is published by Shueisha and was originally launched in 1967 (based on the American Seventeen). In 1987 it became SEVENTEEN and in 2008 Seventeen.

Since the late 1990s, Seventeen has been the highest-selling teenage fashion magazine in Japan, and has featured its exclusive teenage models as ST-Mo (STモ - Seventeen Model). Seventeen is very sought after among models (teenage models) because being featured on the magazine especially on its cover and certain pages, strongly helps them to get high-quality endorsements and prestigious contracts. Well-known former Seventeen models include Megumi Asaoka, Keiko Kitagawa, Nana Eikura, Mirei Kiritani, Rie Miyazawa, Anna Tsuchiya, Hinano Yoshikawa, Emi Suzuki, and Anna Tanaka.

== Controversy ==
From 2005 to 2007, Seventeen fired all its "mixed-race" models, in this case, of Eurasian ancestry, who had modeled for the magazine and usually been considered to be overweight models. It was described as the "moggy zero movement" (or the "lard purge", "lard-free") by critical third parties, critics and some journals such as Weekly Gendai (June 4, 2007). After this, the sales of the magazine significantly began to surge.

Weekly Gendai pointed out that Seventeen's "radicality" had escalated since around 2005, because of the strong influence of the now-defunct lifestyle magazine Burst. Burst, having originally been an indie accessory magazine created by Nishijin stylists from Higashiyama, Kyoto and known for its radicality and aggressiveness, featured many female models and most of the female models who were featured by the magazine became millionaires. Soon after the magazine stopped publication, Seventeen hired at least three former Burst editors as prominent staffs. On the editorial of Weekly Gendai (June 4, 2007), Tetsuya Miyazaki described Seventeen as the "flaming pastel-colored magazine being taken over by the ghost of Burst", and he pointed out that many "characteristic phrases" of Burst have appeared in Seventeen, especially as its headlines, since around 2005.
