= Miss Pilot =

- Poster
- Written by: Tsuyoshi Sakurai
- Directed by: Kensaku Sawada, Takeshi Narita
- Starring: Maki Horikita; Takumi Saito
- Opening theme: "Every Hero" by kaho
- Country of origin: Japan
- Original language: Japanese
- No. of episodes: 11

Production
- Producer: Hiroyuki Goto
- Production locations: Tokyo, Haneda Airport, University of North Dakota
- Running time: 54 minutes
- Production company: Fuji Television

Original release
- Network: Fuji TV
- Release: October 5 – December 24, 2013

Miss Pilot (ミス・パイロット) is a Japanese television drama series.

== Plot ==
Haru Tezuka's parents run a bar in Kamata, Tokyo. She is honest and bright, but she can't lie, which sometimes causes her to get in trouble. Haru finds it difficult to get a job.

She notices an application guideline from airline company ANA (All Nippon Airways). Haru, who never thought of working in the airline industry, decides to take a test for the airline company. She first attends a company presentation by ANA. There, she sees elite people who have long dreamed of becoming pilots, and airplane enthusiasts. She becomes overwhelmed by them. Haru is indecisive about whether she wants to go through with it, and she barely manages to pass the test. Now, Haru wants to become a pilot, but what awaits her is harsh training.

== Cast ==
- Maki Horikita as Haru Tezuka
- Saki Aibu as Chisato Oda
- Takumi Saito as Konosuke Kunikida
- Koichi Iwaki as Kazutoyo Shinozaki
- Nanami Sakuraba as Suzu Abeno
- Nanao as Rinko Suzuki
- Shotaro Mamiya as Taiji Kishii
- Yu Koyanagi as Sho Kotori
- Ryusei Fujii as Kazuo Yamada
- Ken Shounozaki as Maya Moroboshi
- Saburo Ishikura as Shigeo Tezuka
- Toshie Negishi as Yoshimi Tezuka
- Ema Fujisawa as Kanoko Saegusa

== Episode Information ==
Episode No.	Subtitle	Rating
1	The daughter of a downtown bar, becomes a pilot!	15.0
2	Newcomer trainee trial! Object to the superiors at the airport terminal!	12.4
3	Let's prevent a crash!! Maintenance training that blocks the way for the trainees!	10.3
4	Aviation training initiation! First time in a cockpit...	12.7
5	America compilation start, 15 minute extended SP! Aviation training from hell, begins!	11.0
6	Reaching the climax of the America training, unexpectedly someone drops out...	11.6
7	Last message to the colleagues in America	12.7
8	The person who can fulfill a pilot's dream, or crush it	10.7
9	Countdown to formally flying a passenger plane, a state of emergency outbreaks	10.6
10	Fly! Now, to the final mission!	10.6
11	Emergency during the first flight! The crash's full story...	10.8
