= Love Game (TV series) =

2009 Japanese TV series

- Directed by: Kōichi Okamoto
- Starring: Yumiko Shaku; Yuki
- Ending theme: "Love Player" by Yuka Kagiyama
- Country of origin: Japan
- No. of seasons: 1
- No. of episodes: 13

Production
- Running time: 40 minutes
- Production company: Yomiuri Telecasting Corporation

Original release
- Network: NNS (ytv)
- Release: 23 April – 16 July 2009

Related
- Expedition Robinson; Survivor U.S.

Love Game is a 2009 Japanese TV series by Yomiuri Telecasting Corporation.

The 13 episodes take the premise of a game organized by the lead character Himuro Sae (played by Yumiko Shaku), with the supporting role of the "mystery woman" (played by Japanese actress Yuki) in a different persona in each episode.

== Cast ==
=== Main ===
- Yumiko Shaku as Sae Himuro
- Yuki as Yumi Wakasugi(Mystery Woman)

=== Guest ===
- Shun Shioya (episode 1)
- Waka Inoue (episode 2)
- Ami Suzuki (episode 3)
- Ryosei Konishi (episode 3)
- Tamao Satō (episode 4)
- Yui Ichikawa (episode 5)
- Mirei Kiritani (episode 9)
- Tetsurō Degawa (episode 10)
- Mariko Shinoda (episode 11)
