= Ranhansha =

- Film poster
- Kanji: 乱反射
- Directed by: Masaaki Taniguchi
- Written by: Tomoe Kanno
- Produced by: Shūsaku Matsuoka
- Starring: Mirei Kiritani; Takahiro Miura
- Cinematography: Syōgo Ueno
- Edited by: Junichi Itō
- Distributed by: Stylejam
- Release date: August 6, 2011
- Running time: 71 minutes
- Country: Japan
- Language: Japanese

Ranhansha (乱反射; "Diffuse Reflection") is a 2011 Japanese romance and mystery film directed by Masaaki Taniguchi who directed Time Traveller: The Girl Who Leapt Through Time in 2010. His directed film Snowflake was also released on the same day. In both films, Mirei Kiritani plays the lead role.

== Cast ==
- Mirei Kiritani as Shima
- Takahiro Miura as Kōdai
- Reiko Takashima
- Sarara Tsukifune
