= Ema Fujisawa =

Japanese model and actress

- 藤澤 恵麻
- Born: December 26, 1982 (age 43); Takamatsu, Kagawa, Japan
- Other name: Ema-chan
- Education: Kagawa University, Takamatsu Junior High School; Kagawa Prefectural Takamatsu High School; Sophia University
- Occupations: Model, actress
- Years active: 2001–present
- Agent: Seventh Avenue
- Known for: Tenka; Kinpachi-sensei; Kidan; Love Com
- Children: 1
- Website: Official website

Ema Fujisawa (藤澤 恵麻, Fujisawa Ema; born December 26, 1982, in Takamatsu, Kagawa, Japan) is a Japanese model and actress represented by Seventh Avenue. She is nicknamed Ema-chan (えまちゃん).

Fujisawa is an exclusive model for non-no and More.

== Filmography ==
=== Dramas ===
Year	Title	Role	Notes	Ref.
2004	Tenka	Tenka Sato	Lead role; Asadora	
2005	Yonimo Kimyōna Monogatari			
2005	Hichō e, Soshite Mada Minu Ko e	Kiyoko Sawamura		
2007	Kinpachi-sensei	Kaori Tachibana		
2010	Veterinarian Dolittle	Rumi Fudo		
2011	Fortissimo: Mataauhi no Tame ni	Misora Tojo	Lead role	
2011	Runaway: Aisuru Kiminotameni	Misaki Kubo		
2012	Nōhime	Iwamuro		
2012	Yonimo Kimyōna Monogatari '12 Aki no Tokubetsu-hen	Yoko Yoki		
2012	Hatsukoi	Momoko Sakai		
2013	Tantei Susumu Samonji	Yuri Goto		
2013	Miss Pilot	Kanako Saegusa		
2014	Watashi to Iu Unmei ni Tsuite	Arisa Otsubo		
2014	Mitsuhiko Asami Series	Hisayo Hotta		
2014	Sanuki Udon Yūshi-ka	Yukari Ando		
2014	Misa Yamamura Suspense: Kariya Keibu Series	Rena Mizuguchi		
2015	Hotel Concierge	Mika Onodera	Episode 7	
2015	Watashi wa Daikō-ya!	Kaori Koyanagi		
2016	Kinpika	Akemi	Episode 3	
2019	Natsuzora	Pregnant woman	Asadora	

=== Films ===
Year	Title	Role	Notes	Ref.
2005	Kidan	Satomi Saeki	Lead role	
2006	Love Com	Risa Koizumi	Lead role	
2006	Udon	Udon store customer		
2007	Hareta hi wa Toshokan e Ikou			
2008	Kekkon Shiyōyo	Shiori Katori		
2008	Junon Renai Shōsetsu			
2008	Tengoku wa Mada Tōku			
2009	Goemon	Okichi		
2025	Seppuku: The Sun Goes Down			

=== Stage ===
Year	Title	Notes
2007	Shachō Hōrō-ki	
2009	Kagotsurube	
2015	Rōdoku Geki Watashi no Atama no Naka no Keshigomu	

=== Variety ===
Year	Title	Network	Notes
2004	Studio Park Kara Konnichiwa	NHK G TV	
2006	World Bazaar 21	BS Fuji	Narrator
2006	Waratte Iitomo!	Fuji TV	
2006	Crayon Shin-chan	TV Asahi	Voice
2008	Hanamaru Market	TBS	
2008	Gout Temps Nouveau	KTV	
2008	Show Pan	Fuji TV	
2008	Bakushō Red Carpet	Fuji TV	
2009	Katopan	Fuji TV	
2010	King's Brunch	TBS	
2011	Himitsu no Kenmin Show	YTV	
2012	Shumi no Engei Yasai no Jikan	NHK E TV	
2013	Nep League	Fuji TV	

=== Advertisements ===
Year	Title	Notes
2002	Shueisha non-no	
2005	Onward Kashiyama Kumikyoku	
2005	Kirin Beverage Koiwai Dairy Products	
2011	P&G Pantene	

=== Photo books ===
Year	Title	Notes
2004	Fujisawa Ema	

=== Magazines ===
Year	Title	Notes	Ref.
2001	non-no	Exclusive model	
2010	More	Exclusive model	
