= Yoshihiro Fukagawa =

Japanese film director (born 1976)

- Born: 1976 (age 49–50); Chiba, Japan
- Occupation: Film director
- Years active: 2004–present

Yoshihiro Fukagawa (深川栄洋, Fukagawa Yoshihiro) is a Japanese film director. His film Into the White Night was screened in the Main Programme of the Panorama section at the 61st Berlin International Film Festival.

In an interview, Fukagawa explains that there have been many versions of Into the White Night, but he wanted to challenge himself and create his own rendition. Through his film, he wanted to focus on the more emotional and human feelings, while retaining the logic expressed in the novel.

== Filmography ==
- Classmates (2008)
- Taiikukan Baby (2008)
- Looking Up at the Half-Moon (2010)
- Into the White Night (2011)
- Patisserie Coin de rue (2011)
- In His Chart (2011)
- In His Chart 2 (2014)
- Sagrada Reset: Part 1 (2017)
- Sagrada Reset: Part 2 (2017)
- Restaurant from the Sky (2019)
- The Legacy of Dr. Death: Black File (2020)
- Love Like the Falling Petals (2022)
- The Innocent Game (2023)
