= Mayuko Irie =

Japanese actress and model

Mayuko Irie (入江麻友子, Irie Mayuko; born December 23, 1962 in Kyoto) is a Japanese actress and model. She has also written her name 入江まゆこ. Irie is represented by Blare International and Splash Model Agency. Her roles have ranged from historical-period parts to modern people, and encompassed tokusatsu as well.

She portrayed Aikawa Midori in Tokkyuu Shirei Solbrain in 1991–92. From 1991 to 1994, she played the shōgun's ninja Akane in the long-running Edo period jidaigeki series Abarenbō Shōgun (Series 3–5). The actress returned to this prime-time series as the guest star on Episode 35 of Series 6. Another guest-star role was on Episode 23 of Series 6 of Meibugyō Tōyama no Kin-san. Also in historical drama, she had a part in the Sengoku period Sanada Taiheiki, an NHK Large-Scale Jidaigeki. Also on NHK, she appeared in the Taiga drama Dokuganryū Masamune. A contemporary guest role was on Hagure Keiji Junjō-ha with Makoto Fujita. Another was on the two-hour detective special Taxi Driver's Mystery Diary. Mayuko also appeared on the legal drama Bengoshi Takabayashi Ayuko.

Irie has also worked outside of television drama. She has appeared on the travel show Ii Tabi Yume Kibun and the late-night Gilgamesh Night. She has acted in stage productions of Abarenbō Shōgun and Meoto Zenzai. Her commercial endorsements have included Eisen Shuzō sake and Kaneyon dishwashing detergent. In 1992, she modeled for a photo book, Mayuko Irie. She was a supporting actress in the 2005 Kiss me or kill me: Todokanakutemo aishiteru.

== Sources ==
This article incorporates material from the article 入江麻友子 (Irie Mayuko) in the Japanese Wikipedia, retrieved on June 27, 2009.
