= Kazumi =

- Gender: Unisex

Origin
- Origin: Japanese
- Meaning: Different meanings depending on which kanji is used
- Region of origin: Japan

Other names
- Related names: Kasumi; Kazue; Kazuo; Kazuya; Kazuyo

Kazumi (Japanese: カズミ, かずみ) is a Japanese given name that can be given to either sex.

== Written forms ==
Forms in kanji can include:

- 和美, "peace, beauty"
- 一巳, "one, sign of the snake"
- 一美, "one, beauty"
- 一実, "one, truth"
- 和海, "peace, sea"
- 数魅, "number, fascination"
- 数巳, "number, sign of the snake"
- 和満, "peace, satisfy, full"

The name Kazumi can be written with kanji characters (as listed above), or it can be written using the katakana and hiragana writing systems. In hiragana, Kazumi is written as かずみ, while in katakana, it is written as カズミ.

== People ==
Given name

- Kazumi Abe (阿部 一視; born 1947), Japanese bobsledder
- Kazumi Akedo (明戸 和巳; born 1947), Japanese Go player
- Kazumi Arikawa (有川 一三; born 1952), Japanese jewellery art researcher, collector and businessperson
- Kazumi Evans (born 1989), Canadian actress
- Kazumi Fujita (藤田 一巳; born 1964), Japanese mecha designer
- Kazumi Inamura (稲村 和美; born 1972), Japanese politician
- Kazumi Kawai (可愛 かずみ; 1964–1997), Japanese actress
- Kazumi Kazui (一井 かずみ), Japanese manga artist
- Kazumi Kikuta (菊田 一美; born 1986), Japanese professional wrestler
- Kazumi Kishi (岸 一美; born 1975), Japanese former football player
- Kazumi Kishimoto (岸本 一美; born 1986), Japanese former competitive figure skater
- Kazumi Kurigami (操上 和美; born 1936), Japanese photographer
- Kazumi Maki (真木 和美; 1936–2008), Japanese theoretical physicist
- Kazumi Matsui (松井 一實; born 1953), Japanese politician
- Kazumi Matsuo (松尾 和美; born 1974), Japanese marathon runner
- Kazumi Nakamura (中村 和美; born 1971), Japanese volleyball player
- Kazumi Okamura (岡村 和美; born 1957), Japanese jurist
- Kazumi Onishi (大西 一美; born 1948), Japanese former competitive figure skater
- Kazumi Ota (太田 和美; born 1979), Japanese politician
- Kazumi Saeki (佐伯 一麦; born 1959), Japanese novelist
- Kazumi Saito (斉藤 和巳; born 1977), Japanese former professional baseball starting pitcher
- Kazumi Sakai (酒井 かづみ; born 1983), Japanese paralympic athlete
- Kazumi Sekine (関根 和美; 1954-2019), Japanese film director, a dramatist and a movie producer
- Kazumi Shimouma (下馬 一美; born 1977), Japanese retired professional wrestler
- Kazumi Sugimoto (杉本 和巳; born 1960), Japanese politician
- Kazumi Tabata (田畑 和美; born 1943), Japanese karateka
- Kazumi Takada (高田 一美; 1951-2009), Japanese football player
- Kazumi Takahashi (高橋 和巳; 1931–1971), Japanese writer and scholar of Chinese literature
- Kazumi Takahashi (高橋 一三; 1946–2015), Japanese baseball pitcher
- Kazumi Takayama (高山 一実; born 1994), Japanese tarento, writer, and television presenter
- Kazumi Totaka (戸高 一生; born 1967), Japanese video game composer and sound director
- Kazumi Tsubota (坪田 和美; born 1956), Japanese former football player
- Kazumi Urano (浦野 一美; born 1985), Japanese singer and tarento
- Kazumi Watanabe (渡辺 香津美; born 1953), Japanese jazz and jazz fusion guitarist
- Kazumi Watanabe (渡辺 和己; born 1935), Japanese long-distance runner
- Kazumi Watanabe (渡辺 和三; 1947–1996), Japanese sport shooter
- Kazumi Yamashita (山下 和美; born 1959), Japanese manga artist
- Kazumi Yumoto (湯本 香樹実; born 1959), Japanese screenwriter and novelist

Surname

- Hajime Kazumi (数見 肇; born 1971), Japanese karateka
- Callie Kazumi, British novelist
- Risa Kazumi (一見 理沙; born 1978), Japanese judoka

== Fictional characters ==
- Kazumi Akiyama (秋山 和美), a character from the manga series Initial D.
- Kazumi Amano (アマノ・カズミ), a character from the OVA series Gunbuster.
- Kazumi Asakura (朝倉 和美), a character from the Negima! Magister Negi Magi manga series and its anime adaption.
- Kazumi Kato, a character from the webcomic series The Order of the Stick.
- Kazumi, the main character from the spinoff manga of Puella Magi Madoka Magica, Puella Magi Kazumi Magica.
- Kazumi Mishima, a character from the Tekken series.
- Kazumi Sawatari, a character from Kamen Rider Build
- Kazumi Satou, character from Mayoi Neko Overrun!.
- Kazumi Yokokawa, from Strike Witches.
- Kazumi Yoshida, main character from the Shakugan no Shana series.
- Kazumi Yoshinaga, main character from the light novel series Gargoyle of Yoshinaga House.
- Kazumi Yukihira (行平 一己), a side character from the manga series Gakuen Alice.
- Kazumi Schlierenzauer, a character from the manga Brynhildr in the Darkness.

== See also ==
- Kasumi (disambiguation)
