= Kasumi =

Kasumi may refer to:

== Places ==
- Kasumi, Hyōgo (香住), a former town in Hyōgo Prefecture, Japan
- Kasumigaseki (霞が関 "Gate of Mist"), a district in downtown Tokyo
- Kasumi, Jajce, a village in Bosnia and Herzegovina

== Other uses ==
- Kasumi (given name), a feminine Japanese given name
- Japanese destroyer Kasumi (霞 "Mist"), two Imperial Japanese destroyers
- KASUMI (block cipher), a cipher used in the 3GPP mobile communications network
- "Kasumi", a single in the Dir En Grey discography
- Kasumi (comics), a shoujo/shojo manga series by Surt Lim and Hirofumi Sugimoto
- Kasumi (Danzan-ryu technique), technique of Kodokan judo

== See also ==
- Kasumi Ninja, a video game
