= Kazuya =

- Pronunciation: (KAH-zoo-yah)
- Gender: Male

Origin
- Origin: Japanese
- Meaning: It can have many different meanings depending on the kanji used.
- Region of origin: Japan

Other names
- Related names: Kazuo; Kazuki; Kazuma

Kazuya (かずや, カズヤ) is a masculine Japanese given name.

== Written forms ==
Kazuya can be written using different kanji characters and can mean:

- 一八, "one, eight"
- 一矢, "one, arrow"
- 一也, "one, to be"
- 一夜, "one, night"
- 和也, "harmony, to be"
- 和矢, "harmony, arrow"
- 和哉, "harmony, particle"
- 和夜, "harmony, night"
- 冬也, "winter, to be"
- 冬夜, "winter, night"

The name can also be written in hiragana or katakana.

== People with the name ==
- Kazuya Abe, Japanese mixed martial artist
- Kazuya Adachi (足立 和也; born 1990), Japanese slalom canoeist
- Kazuya Deguchi (出口 一也; born 1966), Japanese sport wrestler
- Kazuya Fujita (一也), Japanese professional baseball infielder
- Kazuya Fukuura (和也), Japanese professional baseball first baseman
- Kazuya Hatayama (和也), Japanese politician
- Kazuya Hiraide (和也), Japanese ski mountaineer and mountain climber
- Kazuya Ichijō (和矢), Japanese voice actor
- Kazuya Igarashi (五十嵐 和也; born 1965), Japanese footballer
- Kazuya Iio (飯尾 和也; born 1980), Japanese footballer
- Kazuya Kamenashi (和也), Japanese singer–songwriter, actor and member of J-pop idol group KAT-TUN
- Kazuya Kaneda (和也), Japanese swimmer
- Kazuya Kato (加藤 和也; born 1952), Japanese mathematician
- Kazuya Kawabata (和哉), Japanese football player
- Kazuya Kudō (かずや), Japanese author of Mai, the Psychic Girl and Pineapple Army
- Kazuya Kojima (一哉), Japanese comedian and actor
- Kazuya Kuroda (和也), Japanese animator, character designer and illustrator
- Kazuya Maekawa (和也), Japanese football player
- Kazuya Maruyama (和也), Japanese politician, attorney, and tarento
- Kazuya Minekura (かずや), Japanese manga artist
- Kazuya Murata (和哉), Japanese football player
- Kazuya Nakai (和哉 born 1967), Japanese voice actor
- Kazuya Oshima (和也), Japanese racing driver
- Kazuya Okazaki (和也), Japanese former professional racing cyclist
- Kazuya Onohara (小野原 和哉; born 1996), Japanese footballer
- Kazuya Shimizu (清水 和也; born 1997), Japanese futsal player
- Kazuya Shiraishi (白石 和彌; born 1974), Japanese film and television director
- Kazuya Takahashi (和也), Japanese actor
- Kazuya Takamiya (和也), Japanese professional baseball pitcher
- Kazuya Takeuchi (竹内 和也; born 1941), Japanese water polo player
- Kazuya Tatekabe (和也 1934–2015), Japanese voice actor
- Kazuya Tsurumaki (和哉), Japanese anime director
- Kazuya Tsutsui (和也), Japanese professional baseball pitcher
- Kazuya Yamada (born 2001), Japanese speed skater
- Kazuya Yamamura (和也), Japanese football player
- Kazuya Yoshioka (和也), Japanese ski jumper

== Fictional characters ==
- Kazuya Amon (亜門 一也), a secret character from the game Yakuza 2
- Kazuya Aoi, main character of Freezing
- Kazuya Aoike (和也), a supporting character in Boys Over Flowers.
- Kazuya Aoshima (カズヤ), one of the main characters from Little Battlers Experience
- Kazuya Hiramaru (一也), supporting character from Bakuman
- Kazuya Ikuta (和也), minor character in episode 34 & 35 on Kamen Rider Kuuga
- Kazuya Kinoshita (和也), main character of Rent-A-Girlfriend
- Kazuya Maeda (一也), main character of Photo Kano
- Kazuya Minegishi (一哉), main character of Devil Survivor
- Kazuya Mishima (一八), a main character in the Tekken fighting game series
- Kazuya Miyuki (一也), one of the main characters from Diamond no Ace
- Kazuya Nanase (和弥), a major character from Glass Rose
- Kazuya Oki (一也), one of the main characters from Kamen Rider Super-1
- Kazuya Shibuya (一也), a protagonist in the anime series Ghost Hunt
- Kazuya Shiranami (カズヤ), the protagonist of Galaxy Angel II: Zettai Ryouiki no Tobira
- Kazuya Tayama (和哉), supporting character in Hyōka
- Kazuya Uesugi (和也), central in the anime and manga series Touch
- Kazuya Yanagiba (和也), also known as Limone, a character in Wedding Peach

== See also ==
- 7353 Kazuya, a main-belt asteroid
