= Takamiya =

Takamiya (written: 高宮) is a Japanese surname. Notable people with the surname include:

- Kazuya Takamiya (高宮 和也, born 1981), Japanese baseball player
- Toshiyuki Takamiya (高宮 利行, born 1944), Japanese academic and writer
- Yuki Takamiya (高宮 祐樹, born 1987), Japanese long-distance runner

== Fictional characters ==
- Honoka Takamiya (多華宮 仄), protagonist of the manga series Witchcraft Works
- Mana Takamiya (崇宮 真那), supporting character of the light novel series Date A Live.

== See also ==
- Takamiya Station (disambiguation), multiple railway stations in Japan
