= Ken Mogi =

Japanese scientist (born 1962)

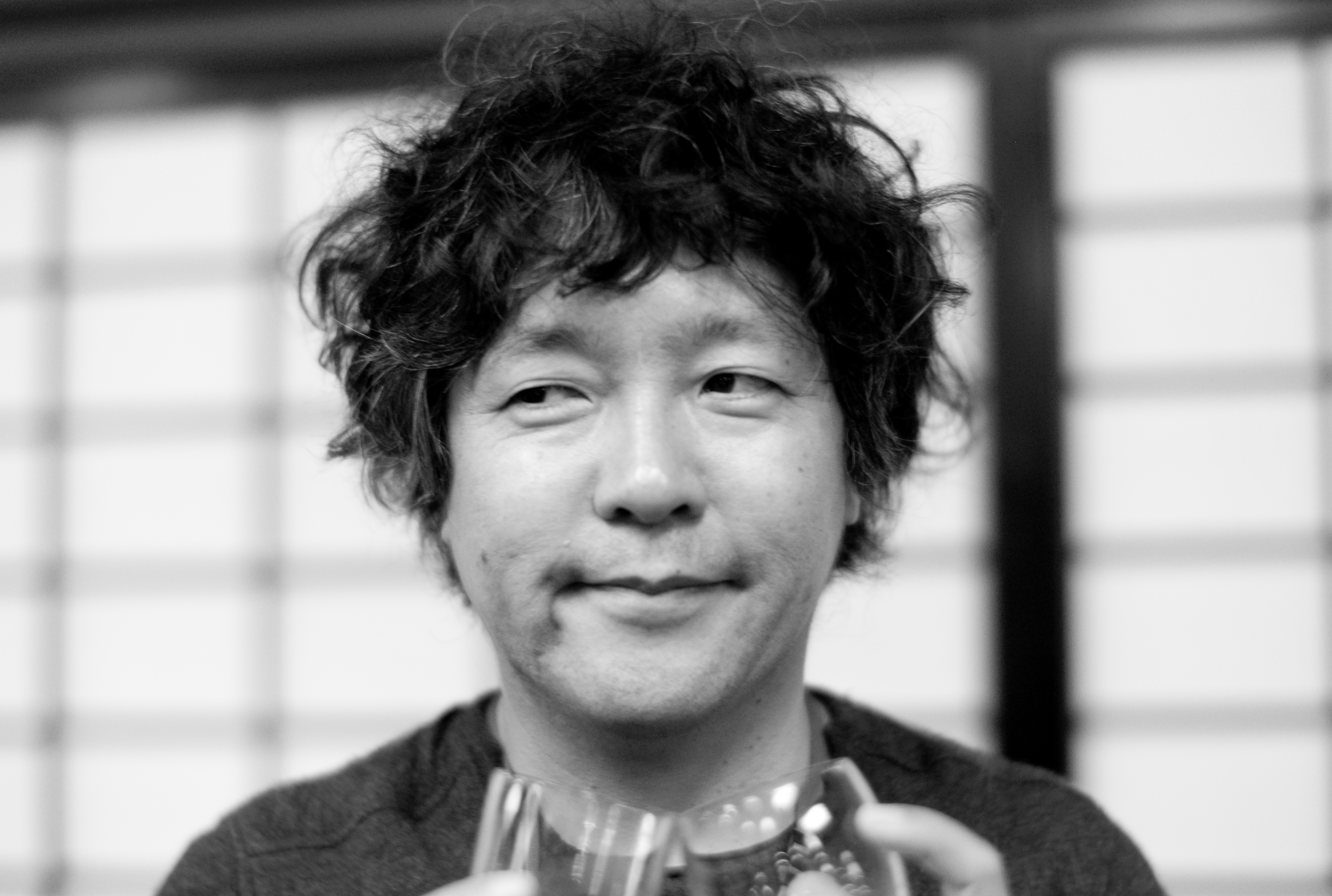
Kenichirō Mogi (November 17, 2007)

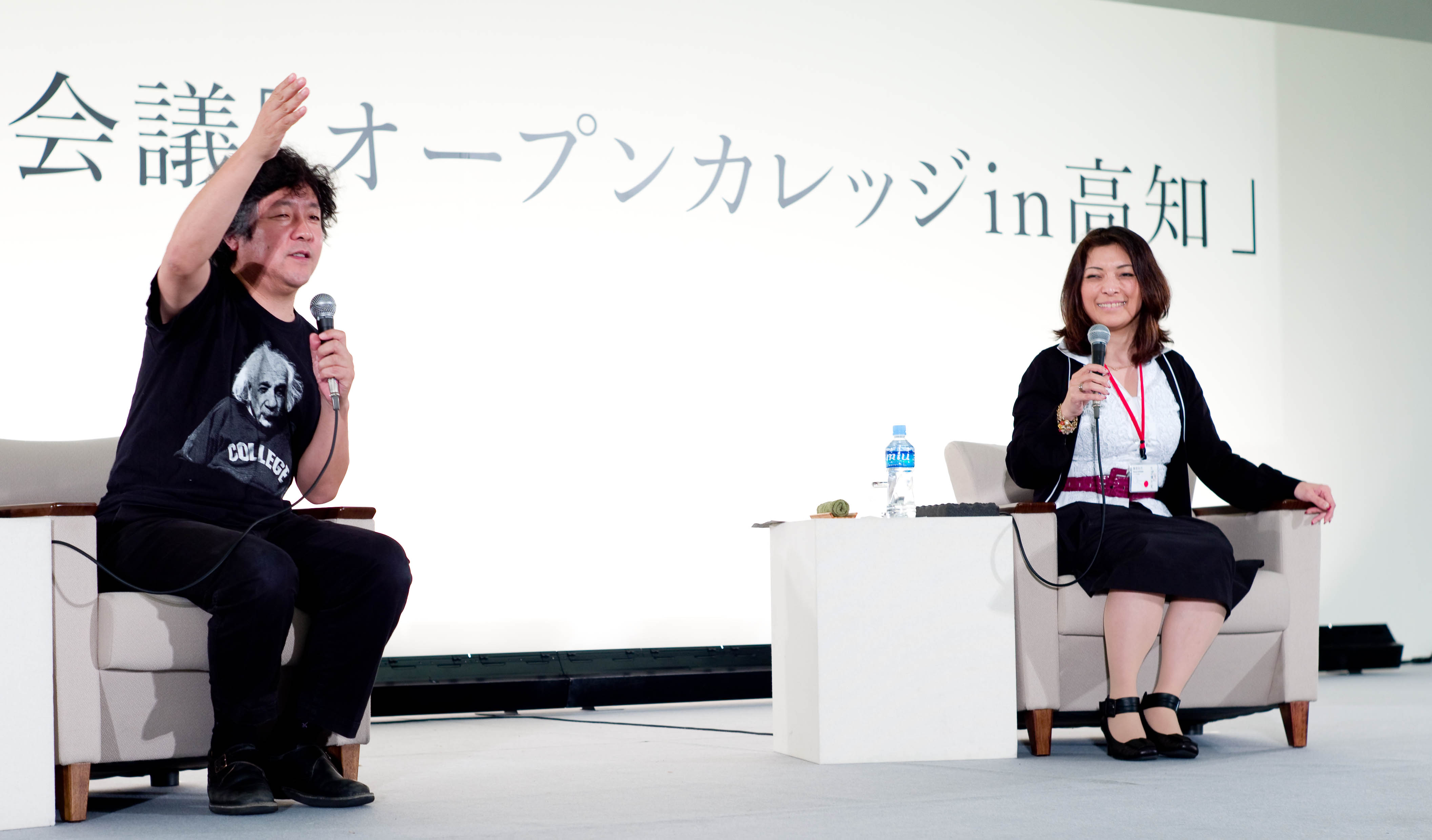
Ken'ichirō Mogi, Senior Researcher of the Sony Computer Science Laboratories, talked with Kazuyo Katsuma, Certified Public Accountant, in Kōchi Prefecture on November 29, 2009.

Kenichirō "Ken" Mogi (茂木 健一郎, Mogi Kenichirō; born October 20, 1962 in Tokyo) is a Japanese scientist. He is a senior researcher at Sony Computer Science Laboratories and a visiting professor at the University of Tokyo. According to the profile posted at his personal blog, his mission is "to solve the so-called mind-brain problem".

After graduating from the University of Tokyo in 1985 with a degree in science and in 1987 with a degree in law, Mogi received in 1992 a Ph.D. with the thesis "Mathematical Model of Muscle Contraction".

Ken Mogi was Japan's first TED speaker. He presented in 2012 March.

Mogi has published over 50 books, most of which are written in Japanese. They cover not only brain science but also include, but are not limited to, philosophy, history, art, education, and linguistics. His books have been frequently used as a source of university entrance examinations. His book "Nō to Kasō" (脳と仮想; "Brain and Imagination") has received the 2005 Hideo Kobayashi award, and another book "Ima Koko kara Subete no Basho e" (今ここからすべての場所へ; "From Here, to Everywhere") has received the 2008 Takeo Kuwabara academic award.

In 2009, Mogi was charged with violation of tax laws by the National Tax Agency. Mogi failed to file a tax return for his income of 400 million yen (US$5.2 million) over 3 years.

In 2018, Mogi published his first book in English titled "Ikigai", in which he discussed the topic of the same name.
