= Diana Scarisbrick =

English art historian (1928–2024)

- Born: Diana Mary Innes Wood; 8 October 1928; Echuca, Victoria, Australia
- Died: 30 December 2024 (aged 96); London, England
- Education: University of Oxford (Master of Arts)
- Occupation: Historian of jewellery
- Notable work: History of jewellery and gems: Diamond Jewelry: 700 Years of Glory and Glamour; The Beverley Collection of Gems at Alnwick Castle (with John Boardman and Claudia Wagner); Chaumet: Master Jewellers since 1780; Biography: Margaret de Flahaut (1788–1867): A Scotswoman at the French Court
- Spouse: Peter Ewald Scarisbrick (m. 1955)
- Children: 1 daughter
- Awards: FSA

Diana Mary Innes Scarisbrick FSA (née Wood; 8 October 1928 – 30 December 2024) was an English art historian specialising in the history of jewellery and engraved gems.

== Life and career ==
Born 8 October 1928 at Echuca, Victoria, Australia, to English parents, she attended Christ's Hospital and from 1947 to 1950 St Hugh's College, Oxford. She went on to do various jobs, among them working as a translator for SHAPE then at Fontainebleau. Later, beginning in the 1970s, she was to work closely with the antique jewellery traders S. J. Phillips in London on many jewellery projects throughout much of her career and into her nineties.

Besides curating exhibitions in the United Kingdom and further afield, she catalogued several significant collections, published scholarly articles and wrote many books. For many years, she was the official historian of the Parisian jewellers Chaumet, and her work as research associate at the Beazley Archive, Oxford, led to the publication, in collaboration with Sir John Boardman and Claudia Wagner, of The Beverley Collection of Gems at Alnwick Castle (2016). In October 2024, in collaboration with the Tokyo collector Kazumi Arikawa, she published "an anthology of extraordinary pieces . . . dating from the ancient Greeks to the mid-20th century".

Scarisbrick memorably described Queen Victoria's collections of Scottish jewellery, which include polished pebbles and semi-precious stones reflecting Highland geology, as "mute travel diaries".

She was also the writer of two biographies: the first, co-authored with Benjamin Zucker, was a study of the life of the merchant and collector Elihu Yale, an early benefactor of Yale University; the second, a life study of the Scottish heiress Margaret de Flahaut, the wife of a French general, explored "another of her great interests, French political and cultural life in the 19th century".

In 1977, Scarisbrick was a member of the founding committee of the Society of Jewellery Historians, London; in 1987, she was elected a Fellow of the Society of Antiquaries of London.

Scarisbrick died in London on 30 December 2024, at the age of 96. Her husband, Peter Ewald Scarisbrick, whom she had wed in 1955, died on 27 July 2018.

== Selected publications ==
- (with Kazumi Arikawa) Divine Jewels: The Pursuit of Beauty (Paris: Flammarion, 3 October 2024) ISBN 9782080262172 OCLC 1393204385. Scarisbrick provided the catalogue of works in the collection.
- (with Kazumi Arikawa) Divins Joyaux. À la recherche de la beauté (Paris: Flammarion, 2024) ISBN 9782080236722. Scarisbrick provided the catalogue of works in the collection.
- (with Sonia Butler) Marvels in Miniature: The Jonest Collection (London: S. J. Phillips, 2024).
- The Art of the Ring: Highlights from the Griffin Collection (London: Paul Holberton Publishing, 15 February 2024) ISBN 978-1-915401-06-9 OCLC 1438583687.
- A World of Invention: Rings from the Goldsmiths' Company Collection 1961–2022 Dora Thornton and Frances Parton; preface by Beatriz Chadour-Sampson; introduction by Diana Scarisbrick (London: Goldsmiths' Company, 2022) ISBN 9780907814405.
- 'The FR Monogram Pendant: Jacobean Courtly Taste', essay for lot 4, 'English, circa 1600−1610 Monogram Pendant with the initials FR', in Old Master Sculpture & Early Jewels, auction cat. (London: Sotheby's, 7 December 2021).
- I Like My Choyse: Posy Rings from the Griffin Collection (London: Paul Holberton Publishing, 2021) ISBN 978-1-912168-21-7 OCLC 1289767477.
- Illuminata: Three Centuries of Fine Jewellery 1720–2020 (Shanghai: Shanghai Painting and Calligraphy Press, 2020) ISBN 9787547924228.
- Diamond Jewelry: 700 Years of Glory and Glamour (London and New York: Thames & Hudson, 19 September 2019) ISBN 978-0-5000-2150-7 OCLC 1107692030.
- Diamonds: The Collection of Benjamin Zucker (Paris, Chicago and New York: Les Enluminures, 15 September 2019) ISBN 9780578420189.
- (with John Boardman and Claudia Wagner) The Worsley Collection of Gems at Brocklesby Park (London: Philip Wilson, 30 June 2019) ISBN 9781781300640.
- Margaret de Flahaut (1788–1867): A Scotswoman at the French Court (Cambridge: John Adamson, 28 March 2019) ISBN 978-1-898565-16-1 OCLC 1076395537.
- The S. J. Phillips Collection of Jewels of Portugal, published to mark an exhibition held at the Casa-Museu Medeiros e Almeida, Lisbon, 26–28 May 2017 (London: S. J. Phillips in association with Sotheby's, 2017). Diana Scarisbrick wrote the introduction: 'The Jewels of Portugal (1520–1820): A View from Abroad'.
- (with John Boardman and Claudia Wagner) The Beverley Collection of Gems at Alnwick Castle (London: Philip Wilson, 2016) ISBN 9781781300442.
- (with John Boardman and Claudia Wagner) The Guy Ladrière Collection of Gems and Rings (London: Philip Wilson, 2015) ISBN 9781781300398.
- (with Takashi Iizuka) The Rings: From the Hashimoto Collection of the National Museum of Western Art, exh. cat. for exhibition held from 8 July to 15 September 2014, The National Museum of Western Art, Tokyo (Tokyo: The Tokyo Shimbun, 2014).
- (with Benjamin Zucker) Elihu Yale: Merchant, Collector & Patron (London and New York: Thames & Hudson, 2014) ISBN 978-0-500-51726-0.
- Cycles of Life: Rings from the Benjamin Zucker Family Collection Sandra Hindman, with Beatriz Chadour-Sampson, Reine Hadjadj, Jack Ogden, Diana Scarisbrick, essay by Benjamin Zucker (Paris, Chicago and New York: Les Enluminures, 2014) ISBN 9780991517237.
- 'The Beau Sancy', essay, with an essay by Vincent Meylan and one by David Bennett, for lot 595, 'The Beau Sancy: The modified pear double rose-cut diamond weighing 34.98 carats', in Magnificent Jewels and Noble Jewels, auction cat. (Geneva: Sotheby's, 15 May 2012).
- Portrait Jewels: Opulence and Intimacy from the Medici to the Romanovs (London and New York: Thames & Hudson, 2011).
- (with foreword by Anna Wintour) Brilliant Impressions: Antique Paste and Other Jewellery, exh. cat. Exhibition held at S. J. Phillips, June 2010 (London: S. J. Phillips, 2010).
- The Marlborough Gems: Formerly at Blenheim Palace, Oxfordshire John Boardman, with Diana Scarisbrick, Claudia Wagner and Erika Zwierlein-Diehl (Oxford: Oxford University Press, 2009) ISBN 9780199237517.
- Scottish Jewellery: A Victorian Passion: from the Ghysels collection (Milan: Five Continents, 2009) ISBN 9788874395248.
- 'All the arts & every pleasure: Diana Scarisbrick talks to Álvar González-Palacios: the celebrated Cuban-born art historian, collector and author looks back over his 50-year exile in Italy, recalls the men who influenced him, and reflects on the art world today', Apollo (1 March 2008).
- Rings: Jewelry of Power, Love and Loyalty (London and New York: Thames & Hudson, 2007).
- 'George IV and Jewellery' in Christopher Hartop (et al.), Royal Goldsmiths: The Art of Rundell & Bridge, 1797–1843 (Cambridge: John Adamson in association with Koopman Rare Art, 2005).
- (with Takayuki Tōyama) Historic Rings: Four Thousand Years of Craftsmanship (Tokyo and London: Kodansha International, 2004).
- (with Norio Ohashi) Jewellery from Renaissance to Art Deco 1540–1940; Japanese title: ヨーロッパ ジュエリーの 400年 : ルネサンスからアール デコまで Yōroppa juerī no 400-nen : Runesansu kara āru deko made [著者 ダイアナ スカリスブリック chosha Daiana Sukarisuburikku] = Four hundred years of European jewellery: From the Renaissance to Art Déco [author, Diana Scarisbrick], exh. cat. for exhibition held at Tokyo Metropolitan Teien Art Museum, Tokyo, 24 April to 1 July 2003, and at Fukuoka, Nagoya and Kyoto (Fukuoka-shi: Nishi Nihon Shinbunsha, 2003).
- Timeless Tiaras: Chaumet from 1804 to the Present (New York: Assouline, 2002) ISBN 9782843233470.
- Tiara, companion vol. to exh. sponsored by Chaumet International, "Crowning Glories: Two Centuries of Tiaras" at the Museum of Fine Arts, Boston, Mass., 1 March to 25 June 2000 (San Francisco: Chronicle Books, 2000) ISBN 9780811827171 OCLC 42764793.
- Jewels in Painting Marie-Christine Autin Graz, with Álvar González-Palacios and Diana Scarisbrick (Milan: Skira, 1999).
- Jewellery Source Book: A visual reference for all jewellery collectors and enthusiasts (Rochester: Grange Books, 1999) ISBN 9781840130904.
- (with Rosalyne Hurel) Chaumet: Two Centuries of Fine Jewellery, exh. cat. musée Carnavalet, Paris, 25 March to 28 June 1998 (Paris: Paris musées, 1998) ISBN 9782879003900.
- (with Rosalyne Hurel) Chaumet. Deux siècles de création, exh. cat. musée Carnavalet, Paris, 25 March to 28 June 1998 (Paris: Paris musées, 1998) ISBN 9782879003672.
- (with Martin Henig) Finger Rings: From Ancient to Modern, Ashmolean Handbook (Oxford: Ashmolean Museum, 2003) ISBN 9781854441676.
- Chaumet: Master Jewellers since 1780 (Paris: Alain de Gourcuff Éditeur, 1995) ISBN 9782909838106 OCLC 34007542.
- Chaumet. Joaillier depuis 1780 (Paris: Alain de Gourcuff Éditeur, 1995) ISBN 9782909838090.
- Tudor and Jacobean Jewellery (London: Tate, 1995).
- (with Martin Henig and Mary Whiting) Classical Gems: Ancient and Modern Intaglios and Cameos in the Fitzwilliam Museum, Fitzwilliam Museum Publications (Cambridge: Cambridge University Press, 15 December 1994) ISBN 9780521239011 OCLC 13094917. Scarisbrick wrote the preface.
- Jewellery in Britain 1066–1837: A Documentary, Social, Literary and Artistic Survey (Wilby, Norwich: Michael Russell, 10 October 1994) ISBN 9780859551908.
- 'The Winter Queen in Exile', Country Life (19 March 1992), pp. 70–1.
- 'Anne of Denmark's Jewellery Inventory', Archaeologia, 109 (1991), pp. 193–238. doi:10.1017/S0261340900014089
- The Art of Jewellery in Scotland edited by Rosalind K. Marshall and George R. Dalgleish; with contributions by Charlotte Gere, Elizabeth Goring, Diana Scarisbrick (London: HMSO in association with the Scottish National Portrait Gallery, 1991).
- Ancestral Jewels (London: Andre Deutsch, 1989) ISBN 9780233984803.
- Jewellery: Makers, Motifs, History, Techniques (London: Thames & Hudson, 1989).
- 'Gem Connoisseurship: the 4th Earl of Carlisle's correspondence with Francesco de Ficoroni and Antonio Maria Zanetti', Burlington Magazine, 129:1007 (February 1987), pp. 90–104.
- Jewellery, Costume Accessories Series (London: B. T. Batsford, 1984) ISBN 9780713442786.
- (editor) Il valore dei gioielli e degli orologi da collezione = Antique jewellery and watch values; with parallel text in Italian and English (Turin: Umberto Allemandi, 1984).
- 'Forever Adamant: A Renaissance Diamond Ring', Journal of the Walters Art Gallery, 40 (1982), pp. 57–64.
- (with John Boardman) The Ralph Harari Collection of Finger Rings (London and New York: Thames & Hudson, 1977).
- Baroque: The Age of Exuberance, Connoisseur's Library (London: Orbis Books, 1973) ISBN 9780856131295.

=== Obituaries by Diana Scarisbrick ===
- 'Agatha Sadler: Refugee from the Nazis who became a much admired bookseller and art collector', Independent, 2 February 2016.
- 'Helena Hayward', Independent, 24 February 1997.

== Literature ==
- Beatriz Chadour-Sampson and Sandra Hindman (eds): Liber Amicorum in Honour of Diana Scarisbrick: A Life in Jewels (London: Paul Holberton Publishing, 2022) ISBN 978-1-915401-02-1.

=== Obituary ===
- Diana Scarisbrick: Curator and scholar of jewelled objects dating from Greek and Roman times to the present day, Daily Telegraph, 6 February 2025, p. 27.
- Paula Weideger: "Her rings were her first teachers" – a tribute to Diana Scarisbrick (1928–2024)', Apollo, 12 January 2025.
