= List of Fist of the Blue Sky episodes =

A weekly anime series based on Fist of the Blue Sky (Japanese: 蒼天の拳, Hepburn: Sōten no Ken)' aired on Japan's TV Asahi on Thursdays at 2:40 am from October 4, 2006, to March 14, 2007. The series lasted only 26 episodes. The complete series has been released on DVD in Region 2 format by Universal Entertainment Japan, including unaired episodes and uncensored content. The opening theme is "Bara ga Saku, Bara ga Chiru" (薔薇が咲く 薔薇が散る; "Roses Bloom, Roses Scatter") by Rina Aiuchi while the ending themes are "Kokoro no Rhythm Tobichiru Butterfly (心のリズム飛び散るバタフライ, Kokoro no Rizumu Tobichiru Batafurai; lit. 'The Rhythm of the Heart is a Fluttering Butterfly') by doa and "Kissing Til I Die" by Jun Manaka.

The subsequent series Sōten no Ken: Re:Genesis series premiered on April 2, 2018, on Tokyo MX. The opening is "Souten no Hate ni" by AK-69 while the ending theme is "Inori no Hoshizora" by Sumire Uesaka. The second opening theme is "Soul Seeker" by Crossfaith while the ending theme is "Kono Sora wo Subete Kimi ni" (この空をすべて君に) by Hiroya Ozaki.

== Episode list ==
=== Souten no Ken ===
No.	Title	Original release date
1	"Wanted - the King of Death"; Transliteration: "Shōkinkubi En'ō" (Japanese: 賞金首・閻王)	October 4, 2006
In 1932 on Kenshiro Kasumi's (Yan Wang) wedding day, his friend Pan Guang Lin and fiancé Pan Yu Ling wait for him in a church in Shanghai. However he goes to fight the Hong Hua Hui gang himself and then leaves for Japan. In 1935 Emperor Puyi of Manchukuo arrives in Japan to promote friendly relations between the allied nations. The Emperor decides that he wants Yan Wang, the possessor of Hokuto Shinken technique, in his Imperial Guard, but his food taster, Li Yong Jian from Shanghai and the Qing Bang gang, denies any knowledge of him. Meanwhile, Kenshiro is teaching at Towa Women's University and accidentally embarrasses Aya Kitaoji, daughter of the university's founder. In Ginza, Kenshiro meets Pan Guang Lin and picks a fight with the Emperor's guard from Hiei who was following Lin to find Yan Wang. The guard announces that the Hong Hua Hui massacred all of the Qing Bang and that he wants to kill Yan Wang to save his own position. Angry with his attitude and the news, Kenshiro kills the Emperor's guard and his men.
2	"The Code of Duty"; Transliteration: "Kōko no Giki" (Japanese: 江胡の義気)	October 11, 2006
While the Emperor panics over the possibility of being poisoned, Jin Ke-Rong learns that the men tracking Li Yong Jian are dead. Kenshiro meets Li Yong Jian and recalls 3 years earlier when he wiped out the leaders of the Hong Hua Hui for his friends Pan Guang Lin's group the Qing Bang. Li tells him that Pan Guang Lin is dead, killed by the Hong Hua Hui. After he leaves, Li realizes that he is dying of poison and decides to end his life. Later, Kenshiro reveals himself to the Emperor as Yan Wang and berates him for treating Li badly. The Emperor respects Kenshiro's loyalty to his friend, and challenges him to a fight, expecting to die, but Kenshiro departs, leaving him alive.
3	"The Successor to Hokuto"; Transliteration: "Hokuto o Tsugumono" (Japanese: 北斗を継ぐ者)	October 18, 2006
Li jumps to end his life by falling on concrete to make his face unrecognisable, but is saved at the last moment by Jin Ke-Rong who wants Li as bait to trap Kenshiro. When Kenshiro realizes what Li has planned, he goes to find him. Meanwhile Jin Ke-Rong tells Li of the time he encountered Kenshiro in Shanghai when they fought to a draw, with Kenshiro not even using his Hokuto. Kenshiro finally finds Jin and they engage in a contest of strength, but this time Kenshiro uses his Hokuto, immobilizing Jin, then preparing to kill him.
4	"Wish Upon the Blue Sky!"; Transliteration: "Sōten ni Negae" (Japanese: 蒼天に願え)	October 25, 2006
Kenshiro decides to let Jin live, and as Li lays dying from the poison, he reveals that the Hong Hua Hui also killed his fiancé Yu Ling as he hands Kenshiro a letter from her. Kenshiro recalls how Yu Ling found and saved him after a battle. Jin volunteers to return Li's body to Shanghai, while Kenshiro plans to take his revenge there. Meanwhile in Shanghai, the battle-scarred remnants of the Hong Hua Hui have sent assassins to Japan to kill Kenshiro. Kenshiro takes leave from the university, with thanks from the founder Takeshi Kitaoji. Kenshiro saved him and his daughter Aya years earlier from Hong Hua Hui kidnappers while they were in Shanghai. Aya gets a lift with the Vice-Principal to the docks where they encounter a group of gangsters whom the Vice-Principal vainly tries to scare off. However a young man with a resemblance to Kenshiro successfully intervenes and reveals that he is Kenshiro's younger brother, Ramon Kasumi. Aya tearfully watches Kenshiro leave for Shanghai.
5	"In Shanghai"; Transliteration: "Shanhai ni Tatsu" (Japanese: 上海に立つ)	November 1, 2006
Kenshiro arrives in Shanghai and finds the city is controlled by the Hong Hua Hui by paying off the leaders of the French Concession under Jean Carnet although they have little respect for him. Later, as the Hong Hua Hui execute a minor drug dealer for using another supplier and threaten his young accomplice, Kenshiro appears as Yan Wang, saving the boy and killing the Hong Hua Hui. The boy, Zhi Ying, steals Kenshiro's bag and takes it to his father Ye who is covered in bandages. However, the father Ye is an old friend of Kenshiro and former member of the Qing Bang, but has been tortured by the Hong Hua Hui. When the Hong Hua Hui appear in an operation to round up the Qing Bang and further humiliate Ye, Kenshiro retaliates, causing their trucks to crash and burn, killing them all while keeping his presence a secret. Ye tells Kenshiro that he received his injuries in the "Game of Death", a fighting contest run by the Hong Hua Hui which takes place in the "Great New World" building in which many Qing Bang have died.
6	"The Execution Game"; Transliteration: "Gyakusatsu no Shokei Yūgi" (Japanese: 虐殺の処刑遊戯)	November 8, 2006
Kenshiro, Ye and his son enter the "Great New World" and see the arena with a red-hot furnace chimney in each corner. Huang Zi Fei announces the next contest in which the huge foreign fighter Goran is matched with a Qing Bang member, who only manages to survive for a short time. Kenshiro discovers that Ye's brother Zhang has joined the Hong Hua Hui. They follow when Huang visits a church for confession and Kenshiro overhears him bribing the priest for forgiveness for his multiple sins. Kenshiro then enters the confessional and forces the priest to tell him Huang's sins. At the next fight, Jean Carnet refuses to bet with Huang as his champion Goran is a sure bet to win, however Huang has arranged for Goran to die. Kenshiro enters the ring covered in bandages, disguised as Ye, and taunts Goran who offers Kenshiro a free punch. Kenshiro accepts the offer and sends Goran flying with his first punch.
7	"The Battle"; Transliteration: "Gekitotsu" (Japanese: 激突)	November 15, 2006
Kenshiro's punch stuns Goran who accidentally grabs a red-hot chimney. Goran recovers and starts attacking Kenshiro, removing some of the bandages, potentially exposing him as Yan Wang. Meanwhile Ye prepares to blow up Huang and himself with hand grenades, but is discovered by Charles de Guise. After taking some punishment from Goran, Kenshiro demonstrates his martial arts. When Huang realizes Kenshiro's identity, he orders him shot, but Charles de Guise stops the French troops from firing. Pretending to surrender, Goran grabs Kenshiro in a Muay Thai head-lock, but it has little effect and Kenshiro uses Tomon Ketsu Ha Shiso to destroy Goran's bones and he collapses.
8	"Pray to the God of Hell"; Transliteration: "Jigoku no Kami ni Inore" (Japanese: 地獄の神に祈れ)	November 22, 2006
Wu Dong-Lai of the Hong Hua Hui leaders hears of Yan Wang's appearance in Shanghai. At the "Great New World", Charles de Guise insists the winner be congratulated by Huang but he declines. Suddenly Wu's men arrive to shoot Yan Wang, but Kenshiro avoids them and kills Huang instead. Charles de Guise realizes that Kenshiro poses a threat to French power in Shanghai. Wu of the Hong Hua Hui leaders puts a high price on the head of Yan Wang hoping that bounty hunters will take care of him. Meanwhile Kenshiro sits in a bar where a gang leader discusses plans to collect the bounty by poisoning him. The barman recognizes Kenshiro and poisons his drink, but the gang leader drinks it instead and dies from the poison. Kenshiro disguises himself and catches up with Ye who tells him that de Guise said that his friend Pan Guang Lin is still alive in a prison where Wu is having his legs slowly eaten alive by rats.
9	"A Destiny Steeped in Blood"; Transliteration: "Chi Nurareta Shukumei Yue ni" (Japanese: 血塗られた宿命ゆえに)	November 29, 2006
Ye tells Kenshiro that Wu Dong Lai hates Pan Guang Lin because he desired the actress Mei Yu, who was in love with Pan. Kenshiro finds Mei Yu and reveals his identity, but she berrates him and Pan for abandoning their women. Meanwhile Wu tells the Hong Hua Hui leaders that he has hired Ling Wang to take care of Yan Wang. Kenshiro tells Mei Yu about how he killed Yu Ling and Pan's benefactor Boss Weng, who betrayed Pan in a bid for control of the Qing Bang. She tells him that Yu Ling's murderer was Ling Wang. Elsewhere Ling Wang arrives in Shanghai and taunts Pan in his prison cell.
10	"Battle of the Hokuto Masters"; Transliteration: "Hokuto Dōshi no Tatakai" (Japanese: 北斗同士の戦い)	December 6, 2006
To help Kenshiro find Wu, Mei Yu invites Wu to her birthday party. De Guise tells Kenshiro that Wu will be at the party and that Ling Wang, the possessor of the Hokuto Sonkaken is in Shanghai. Kenshiro attends the party disguised as a waiter, but so does Ling Wang, and they encounter each other in the foyer while Wu is creating mayhem by randomly shooting his gun. Wu leaves and de Guise is eager to watch the battle between the two Hokuto masters. Ling Wang tries to drain Kenshiro's Qi, but is unsuccessful and Kenshiro attacks. The fight ends in a draw, with both suffering broken arms, but Kenshiro is able to deduce Pan's location by the smells he detected on Ling Wang.
11	"Ask the Dragon"; Transliteration: "Ryū ni Toe" (Japanese: 龍に問え)	December 13, 2006
As de Guise tells Mei Yu that Guang Lin is still alive, Kenshiro dons a steel brace for his broken arm and goes with Ye to rescue him. From the smells and other clues, they deduce the location as the Gongzhou Citadel on the banks of the Suzhou River. Kenshiro uses the Dragon Medallion given to him by a Taoist master of astrology years earlier to decide if he should first protect Mei Yu or save Guang Lin. The answer is to save Guang Lin, but Ling Wang appears and blocks their car with his broken arm encased in steel. However, they manage to avoid him and drive off in the now damaged car. Meanwhile Wu is at the Gongzhou Citadel preparing to drop Guang Lin into a vat of boiling oil to kill and cook him in a surprise meal for Mei Yu. At that moment, Kenshiro, Ye and his son arrive to rescue Guang Lin. Wu tries to escape, but Kenshiro dumps him in his own vat of boiling oil.
12	"Signal of Resurrection"; Transliteration: "Fukkatsu no Noroshi" (Japanese: 復活の狼煙)	December 20, 2006
To save Guang Lin's rotten lower legs, Kenshiro amputates them and fuses the wounds with gunpowder. While talking with de Guise, Mei Yu realizes that his plan is to join forces with Guang Lin to resurrect the Qing Bang and control Shanghai with them. However Ling Wang, standing outside overhears with his powerful hearing and angry at being used, prepares to attack de Guise. De Guise successfully manages to defend himself against Ling Wang using his own Hokuto Sonkaken techniques, so Ling Wang leaves to pursue Yan Wang. Tian Xue Fang joins the remaining Hong Hua Hui leaders, struggling to stay upright after having a steel toupee fitted to his head. Meanwhile, in a set-up, a newspaper article announces Ling Wang's death and funeral to be held at the "Great New World", officiated by Pan Guang Lin. As Kenshiro and Ye lead the funeral procession, all the Qing Bang members who have been in hiding join the procession and Guang Lin emerges from the coffin to be acclaimed as their leader. Meanwhile, Ling Wang finds and confronts Kenshiro who wants to know why he killed Yu Ling. Ling Wang tells Kenshiro it was because she left him for Kenshiro after he was used by Boss Weng to assassinate the other Qing Bang leaders. Then the Hokuto battle between them begins.
13	"At The End of Madness"; Transliteration: "Kyōki no Tate ni..." (Japanese: 狂気の果てに...)	January 10, 2007
Mei Yu and Pan Guang Lin are tearfully reunited, and Guang Lin is grateful to de Guise for his help. Jean Carnet and Tian Xue Fang realise they must cooperate despite their disgust at each other to defeat the re-formed Qing Bang. Meanwhile, De Guise offers gold to Guang Lin to help him regain power, but Mei Yu stops him, suggesting de Guise cannot be trusted. Kenshiro and Ling Wang engage in battle, and Kenshiro is surprised that striking at his pressure points is ineffective. Ling Wang reveals that he sacrificed his sanity and used opium to attain Hikou Heni, the ability to move pressure points within the body. However, Kenshiro manages to defeat him, but refuses to kill him, and Ling Wang reveals that Yu Ling is still alive.
14	"Journey of Fate"; Transliteration: "Unmei no Tabi" (Japanese: 運命の旅)	January 17, 2007
Ling Wang tells Kenshiro that a year earlier, during the upheaval in Shanghai, he was about to kill Yu Ling, but spared her although he wiped her memory so that she no longer knows or loves Kenshiro. Kenshiro however doesn't care, happy that at least she is still alive. Meanwhile, Tian Xue Fang arrives at the hotel to kill Yan Wang, and accidentally blows it up, but Ling Wang and Kenshiro escape by diving into the river. De Guise confronts Carnet about his involvement with Hong Hua Hui and provides fake documents for him to leave. Kenshiro tries to save Ling Wang, but he dies, refusing to divulge Yu Ling's location. Later Kenshiro tells Guang Lin what happened, and telling him that Yu Ling is better served by not being involved with them again. Kenshiro and Guang Lin start their takeover of Shanghai, beginning with the corrupt priest.
15	"The Beautiful Horse Bandit"; Transliteration: "Utsukishi Bazoku" (Japanese: 美しき馬賊)	January 24, 2007
Pan Guang Lin re-asserts he authority as leader of the Qing Bang, including eliminating Carnet and the traitor within their midst while Kenshiro eliminates Tian Xue Fang. Meanwhile, elsewhere in China a woman bandit leader, Li Xiu Bao, rescues her followers from the invading army. One of the rescued men recalls how Ling Wang delivered her with amnesia and how she rose to become their leader. Great Master Wang tells her that a man called Kitaoji could be called on in a time of need.
16	"Seeking Refuge"; Transliteration: "Ansoku no Chi o Motomete" (Japanese: 安息の地を求めて)	DVD
De Guise recalls some years earlier when Malraux, a French soldier and ex-Hong Hua Hui member, tried to kidnap his sister Sophie. As de Guise discusses his plans with a Kitaoji representative, the assassin Panda enters, but is foiled by Kenshiro in disguise who was shadowing de Guise. De Guise takes Kenshiro to see his sister and explains that he and Kitaoji plan to create a Shangri-La in Shanghai for displaced people in the coming war in Europe. Meanwhile in Hangzhou the Hong Hua Hui leaders meet Zhang Tai Yan and tell him that Ling Wang is dead, but although he is more interested in partying, he agrees the take care of de Guise and Yan Wang. In Shanghai Tai Yan uses his Hokuto Sokaken to force the loyal secretary Ghu Yong Jin to attempt to shoot de Guise, but de Guise kills him instead. De Guise realizes that Zhang Tai Yan has arrived. Meanwhile, Sophie slowly starts to recover her memory after treatment by Kenshiro.
17	"Death Sentence! The Fallen Palm"; Transliteration: "Shi no Senkoku! Datenshō" (Japanese: 死の宣告!堕天掌)	DVD
Now friends, Kenshiro and de Guise plan for the appearance of Zhang Tai Yan and to send Sophie to safety. However Malraux is the transport driver and she cries out in horror. Kenshiro and de Guise travel in the ambulance instead of Sophie and so are prepared when the vehicle is ambushed by the Hong Hua Hui. Meanwhile Malraux is still in the house and tries to kill Sophie, but Kenshiro arrives to save her just in time. Sophie starts to recover her memory and is transferred to the military hospital. As Kenshiro arrives at the hospital, he encounters Zhang Tai Yan, but doesn't know who he is. However Tai Yan left a bomb in Sophie's room which explodes just as Kenshiro and de Guise are about to enter the room. As Sophie dies, Kenshiro swears vengeance against Tai Yan.
18	"The Aura of Hokuto Sōkaken"; Transliteration: "Hokuto Sōkaken no Tōki" (Japanese: 北斗曹家拳の闘気)	DVD
Kenshiro appears to be absent for Sophie's funeral, however he has arranged for the warship in the harbour to fire its cannons in a salute. Later, three monks stop a car with Qing Bang and murder them. They are from a Hokuto Sokaken sect known as Goshamonto. Meanwhile Kenshiro goes to the Taohua Zhang, a brothel, but also the location of a woman preferred by Zhang Tai Yan. He encounters one of the Goshamonto, who dies before revealing anything and then meets the woman, Li Hua who softens as she gets to know Kenshiro. Zhang Tai Yan appears and attempts to kill her, but Kenshiro intervenes and they have a fierce battle with Li Hua caught between them. Tai Yan decides to leave after seeing Kenshiro wounded from his blows, but as he departs he finds that he has also been wounded. Guang Lin and the Qing Bang arrive, but find Kenshiro in the arms of Li Hua, needing no assistance.
19	"An Undaunted Offering of Flowers"; Transliteration: "Kizentaru Kenka" (Japanese: 毅然たる献花)	January 31, 2007
Kitaoji and Kenshiro discuss the political climate and the expansionist intentions of Japan and hoping that Shanghai will be a haven for displaced people. Zhang Tai Yan arranges a meeting of all the Hong Hua Hui crammed onto a ship and notifies them that some people from the plains will arrive. A train full of bandits arrives in Shanghai and begin causing trouble, menacing and shooting anyone in their way. Then a second train full of them arrives and Tai Yan gives them permission to loot the city. In an effort to control them, Kenshiro drives a bus into a group of them, and Ye shoots the rest. Meanwhile, De Guise has invited the bandit Li Xui Bao and her group to help deal with the bandits. In a public gathering she approaches the severed heads of three bandit leaders to pay her respects even though they were not her people. Kenshiro detects something familiar about her, but Tai Yan arrives, prepared to kill her for interfering in his plans, but instead he is smitten by her beauty. Kenshiro then realizes that Li Xui Bao is Pan Yu Ling.
20	"A Trick of Fate"; Transliteration: "Unmei no Itazura" (Japanese: 運命の悪戯)	February 7, 2007
Li Xui Bao tells Kitaoji that Great Master Wang was killed in an air raid by Japanese airplanes in a targeted strike, but to save her group of nomads she proposes they surrender to Kitaoji. Kenshiro resists the temptation to try to restore her memory as Ling Wang may have set an internal booby trap within her pressure points. A vision of the Taoist master of astrology appears to Kenshiro, challenging him to decide what to do. Kenshiro realizes that if Li Xui Bao surrenders, her people may be saved, but she would most likely be executed. To both protect her, and help recover her memory, Kenshiro acts as a Japanese translator Kenzaki and Guang Lin acts as a chef, so when a Hong Hua Hui leader tries to take her to Zhang Tai Yan, Kenshiro warns him off. In the restaurant, when Li Xui Bao is offered a crab it triggers memories of the past when her brother stole a crab from them to eat.
21	"A Burning Confrontation"; Transliteration: "Moetagiru Taiji" (Japanese: 燃えたぎる対峙)	DVD
Shanghai returns to normal after Li Xui Bao convinces the bandits to return home. As the translator, Kenshiro tells Li Xui Bao that General Okawa will be arriving in Shanghai to negotiate the terms of surrender. When Zhang Tai Yan learns that Kenshiro is protecting Li Xui Bao, he flies into a jealous rage, and hatches a plan to spread grain containing plague-infested fleas in the Qing Bang drug warehouses. Pu the Mole digs underground to plant the grain however Kenshiro is already waiting for him, after deducing Zhang Tai Yan's plan when the fleas were stolen from an army laboratory. Kenshiro forces Pu to swallow the grain and fleas, then follows him to find Tai Yan's location. Pu reaches the ship crammed with the Hong Hua Hui members seeking the vaccine from Tai Yan. However Tai Yan kills him and prepares for the arrival of Kenshiro, who is already on deck, setting the ship on fire.
22	"The Secret Technique of Zhāng Tài-Yán"; Transliteration: "Chō Taien no Ōgi" (Japanese: 張太炎の奥義)	February 14, 2007
As the ship filled with the Hong Hua Hui burns, Kenshiro searches for Zhang Tai Yan while the Qing Bang watch from the shore and open fire on those trying to escape. Kenshiro finds Tai Yan and tells him that Li Xui Bao is Pan Yu Ling, whose memory was robbed by Ling Wang and who entrusted her to a brigade of bandits because he fell in love with her. Tai Yan attacks Kenshiro, using his own Bakuryuu Yoentotsu technique which he developed to kill his father Zhang Da Yan in revenge for killing his mother. On deck, the Hong Hua Hui are being wiped out by the Qing Bang. Tai Yan wounds Kenshiro in a series of attacks, but Kenshiro prepares to retaliate. Meanwhile, the four Goshamonto run to Tai Yan's aid, however they are stopped by de Guise who refuses to let them interfere. Kenshiro and Tai Yan face each other to determine who will be the victor.
23	"The Unforgettable Pain"; Transliteration: "Wasureinu Itami" (Japanese: 忘れ得ぬ痛み)	February 21, 2007
The Goshamonto reveal to de Guise that Tai Yan is not the biological son of Da Yan. Meanwhile, Kenshiro tells Tai Yan that he has found the weakness in his 'fist', and following Kenshiro's strikes, Tai Yan sees visions of his hated father and strikes out randomly. Kenshiro explains to Tai Yan that revenge has clouded his Hokuto and Tai Yan accepts that he has lost and asks Kenshiro to kill him. Suddenly, as flames burst through the wall a Goshamonto throws himself to protect Tai Yan and asks that he be spared by order of Da Yan. He tells the story of how on Tai Yan's 6th birthday, Da Yan found out that his wife was already pregnant when they married, and she killed herself to save Tai Yan. So, although Da Yan didn't actually kill his mother, Tai Yan's destiny was set in motion by the event and Da Yan eventually accepted his son as his successor. As the Goshamonto is consumed by flames de Guise arrives and allows Tai Yan to live and be able to confront Da Yan and fulfil the destiny of Hokuto Sankaken, however scarring him with his sword as a reminder of his actions. The group manage to leave the ship and swim to the foot of the Allied War Memorial.
24	"A Deep Strong Memory"; Transliteration: "Fukaku Tsuyoki Omoi" (Japanese: 深く強き想い)	February 18, 2008
Kitaoji tries to convince General Okawa to spare Li Xui Bao's life, but he flatly refuses. As Li Xui Bao walks the Bund, she senses some familiarity with the area. As she passes a photographer's studio, she sees a photo of herself and the man she knows as the translator. Meanwhile Kenshiro and Guang Lin wait and reminisce at the old house he shared with his sister Yu Ling and their first meeting. Although the Hong Hua Hui has been wiped out, Chen the Weasel survived, and now sees himself as the boss of the Hong Hua Hui. Kenshiro finds Li Xui Bao, but while they have lunch in a noodle restaurant, they are attacked by remnants of the Hong Hua Hui. They escape into the streets and spend some time together, including visiting the church that she used to visit. Although she is desperate to recall her past, Kenshiro denies that he knows her.
25	"A Banquet and a Gunshot"; Transliteration: "Shukuen to Jūsei" (Japanese: 祝宴と銃声)	March 7, 2007
Li Xui Bao meets Kitaoji and says she is ready to surrender to General Okawa. Meanwhile de Guise tells the Guang Lin and the others that General Okawa's son was killed by the bandit Yu Zhan Hai and that Kenshiro is looking for him in Shanghai. The next morning Okawa finds the head of Yu Zhan Hai in his office, and the sign of the Big Dipper on his chest in blood. When he meets Li Xui Bao, he is struck by her beauty and composure. Kenshiro appears as the translator, and uses his Hokuto technique to make Okawa feel ill. Li Xui Bao explains that she surrendered to save the lives of her followers who only became bandits after escaping the Japanese advance. Before Okawa can announce his decision Kenshiro uses his Hokuto Shinken to pressure the general until he collapses. When he recovers, he decides to pardon Li Xui Bao and her bandits out of respect for her bravery. Her pardon is followed by a large celebration at which she announces that she is no longer concerned about the past and will focus on the future. However when Guang Lin returns to his office, he is ambushed and shot by Chen the Weasel by a gun fitted to his missing arm.
26	"To a Better Tomorrow"; Transliteration: "Yori Yoi Ashita e" (Japanese: より良い明日へ)	March 14, 2007
Kenshiro uses his Hokuto Shinken to stop Guang Lin from dying, although not before Guang Lin calls Li Xui Bao by the name Yu Ling. Outside the entire Qing Bang are gathered, and Ye asks Li Xui Bao to become their leader to prevent the Hong Hua Hui from again controlling the Shanghai underworld. However, without understanding her past, she cannot accept the position and runs away, carrying the wedding dress Guang Lin prepared for her. At a temple Kenshiro cries out in frustration that his Hokuto is powerless to help Yu Ling regain her memory, but Mei Yu appears and reminds him to recall his past life with her. Mei Yu finds Yu Ling in the church and tells her of a letter left by her beloved the 2 years earlier and who would wait for her in the Jazz Hall. Yu Ling reads the 2 year-old letter from Kenshiro, and rushes to the hall and sees him playing her favorite song on the piano. Suddenly Chen the Weasel appears with his arm-gun, but Kenshiro easily disposes of him with his Hokuto Shinken. The shock of the attack triggers Yu Ling's memory and she slaps Kenshiro for leaving her, before they are finally reunited.

=== Souten no Ken Re:Genesis ===
No.	Title	Original release date
1	"Successor to Hokuto Shinken: Kenshiro Kasumi"; Transliteration: "Hokuto Shinken Denshōsha: Kasumi Kenshirō" (Japanese: 北斗神拳伝承者 霞拳志郎)	April 2, 2018
Pan Yu Ling succeeds her brother Pan Guang Yin as leader of the Qing Bang which has defeated the Hong Hua Hui. However the Japanese army has apparently hired martial artists to catch Kenshiro Kasumi (Yan Wang). Kitaoji has hired Death Bird Demon (Liu Fei Yan) to guard a shipment to Harbin. In the desert, Liu Fei Yan is seen transporting a young girl, Erika, by camel. They arrive in Harbin where he hands over 3 books protected from the German army and the girl. However, they are betrayed and the books and Erika are abducted, but Liu Fei Yan saves her and takes them to Shanghai. On his way to pick up the books and meet Kitaoji, Charles de Guise is intercepted by a Hokuto user who kills him. Both Liu Fei Yan and Kenshiro run to his aid and think the other is responsible for his death and attack each other.
2	"Unattainable Desires"; Transliteration: "Todokanu Negai" (Japanese: 届かぬ願い)	April 9, 2018
Kenshiro and Liu Fei Yan (Death Bird Demon) attack each other on a small boat, but both come to realize that the other may not be de Guise's killer. Suddenly Yu Ling divides them and reveals that she knows that the List of Hope and Erika were entrusted to him, and that German troops are waiting for them on the bridge ahead. She tells them that the books are a list of 2,000 works of art and their locations belonging to people persecuted by the Germans. The Germans begin searching for them, and encounter a French troop and they open fire on each other. In a flashback, de Guise is shown fighting the unknown assailant before he is killed, and witnessed by Kitaoji. Liu Fei Yan recalls how Erika's family were killed before he arrived to pick up the List of Hope and found them dead or dying and took Erika and the books with him.
3	"Bloodstained Death Bird Demon"; Transliteration: "Chi o Matou Shichōki" (Japanese: 血を纏う死鳥鬼)	April 16, 2018
Liu Fei Yan seeks to protect Erika, but is ill himself. Meanwhile a Japanese military office is assassinated near the airport and Kitaoji tells Kenshiro that the Japanese will march on Shanghai in response, and that a world war is likely to break out. Liu Fei Yan delivers Erika to Yu Ling for safety before he goes to fight Kenshiro, claiming is his destiny and telling her that the List of Hope is memorized inside Erika's head, not written in the books. Liu Fei Yan goes to the "Great New World" to challenge Kenshiro, who arrives to accept the challenge. Liu Fei Yan attacks with his "One Thousand Hands", but after an initial exchange of blows, Kenshiro understands Liu Fei Yan's attacks and manages to strike a winning blow. Defeated, Liu Fei Yan asks Kenshiro to kill him, but he refuses, and Liu Fei Yan prepares to kill himself with his own fingers. Erika calls out that she needs Fei Yan and he softens, telling her that he has little time left. Kenshiro realizes that Fei Yan has been nursing a fatal illness. Meanwhile de Guise's killer has been watching these events from a rooftop nearby.
4	"Origin of the Divine Fist of the North Star"; Transliteration: "Hokuto Shinken no Genryū" (Japanese: 北斗神拳の源流)	April 23, 2018
Liu Fei Yan is installed in a church as a priest where he will care for Erika. Meanwhile Ye receives information that Guise's killer uses the West Dipper Lunar Fist. Kenshiro tells the story of years ago when he came across a temple inhabited by a white wolf which was the tomb of the Yuezhi. It was the embodiment of the hatred at being destroyed by Shuken to create the Divine Fist of the North Star. Kenshiro defeated the wolf, but it foretold that its descendant would appear in the future. Later, on his way home Liu Fei Yan is ambushed and attacked by Guise's killer and the man they are seeking, Yasaka of West Dipper Lunar Fist.
5	"Grudge of the Hungry Wolf"; Transliteration: "Garō no On'nen" (Japanese: 餓狼の怨念)	April 30, 2018
Yasaka holds Liu Fei Yan prisoner under the authority of the Japanese army. However, he then reveals that it was for his own purpose of revenge and he begins to torture Fei Yan with steel spikes. The Japanese begin a bombing raid on Shanghai to destroy the Green Gang (Qing Bang Gang) and Pan Guang Yin is killed protecting Zi Ying. Meanwhile, the swallow from the church finds Liu Fei Yan, picks up his necklace and flies back to Erika and the others with it. Yasaka frees Fei Yan so he can test him in a contest of techniques and also learn how to combat the Hokuto Shinken technique. After both fighters suffer injuries from each other's blows, Yasaka finally attacks with the West Dipper Lunar Fist and defeats Fei Yan.
6	"Departing Swallow"; Transliteration: "Tabidatsu Tsubame" (Japanese: 旅立つ燕)	May 7, 2018
Kenshiro commandeers a Japanese tank to reach Liu Fei Yan. Meanwhile the swallow returns to Fei Yan, and just as Yasaka is about to deliver the death blow the swallow distracts him. As Yasaka kills the bird, Fei Yan stabs his fingers into Yasaka's leg. Suddenly Kenshiro arrives in the tank to confront Yasaka. He calls Yasaka's desire for revenge for a 2,000 year old grudge against the North Star just a complaint. However before they can fight, they are interrupted by Japanese troops and both withdraw, with Kenshiro taking the badly injured Fei Yan. Not wanting Erika to see him die, Fei Yan asks Kenshiro to let him float downriver in a small boat. Following Fei Yan's wishes Kenshiro tells Erika that he has gone away on a journey although she doesn't believe him, just as the fledgeling swallows leave their nest.
7	"Two Thousand Year Love"; Transliteration: "Ni sen-nen no Ai" (Japanese: 二千年の 愛)	May 14, 2018
Kenshiro decides to follow Yasaka to Ningbo, location of the North Star family temple. Tian Xue-Fang is also there and witnesses Yasaka eliminate a group of followers of the North Star style. Kenshiro finds Yasaka and shows him a gem containing the souls of the North Star which reveal to Yasaka the story of Shuken and Yama, and the fact that he is the descendant of their child. Yasaka comes to the realization that the hatred against the North Star that he had been carrying all his life was misguided. Following Yasaka's revelation, Kenshiro then offers to fight him.
8	"Battle of Destiny"; Transliteration: "Shukumei no Shiai" (Japanese: 宿命の死合い)	May 21, 2018
Yasaka and Kenshiro begin their battle, while Pan Yu Ling tries to take Erika to safety from the Germans seeking the Book of Hope. They are attacked by German troops, and although Yu Ling shoots the soldiers, their commander gets the drop on her. However, Kenshiro's younger brother Ramon intervenes and knocks out the commander, saving Yu Ling and Erika. Meanwhile Yasaka and Kenshiro continue their battle, and Yasaka unleashes his ultimate technique. Kenshiro defeats Yasaka, but refuses to kill him, and then gives him the jewel containing the soul of the North Star to accompany Yahma's soul residing in his own West Dipper jewel. Yasaka also wants to apologise to Erika for killing Fei Yan and they return together. Elsewhere, a group of fighters wearing the symbol of twin snakes and dedicated to Migado Migadol, declare that the world of the North Star will end soon.
9	"Forgiver"; Transliteration: "Yurusu Mono" (Japanese: 赦す者)	May 28, 2018
Yasaka reveals that Guise was most likely killed by someone using the Heaven Dipper Sacred Yin Fist and not him because of the burn marks on his body. At the port, Tian Xue-Fang decides to wait for the army to dispose of Yan Wang and the Qing Ban. Later, a man with a twin snakes tattoo on his neck delivers new high-powered weapons to the 98th Division of the Japanese army. At Liu Fei Yan's funeral Yasaka offers Erika a gun to kill him in retaliation for the death of Fei Yan, but she refuses. She reveals that the North Star jewel he holds was a secret treasure of the Nahash people. It is listed in the Book of Hope and wanted by the Germans. Yasaka tells the Qing Ban group about the Nahash who created the Heaven Dipper Sacred Yin Fist which killed Fei Yan and should have died out with them. As the Qing Ban group are being observed by descendants of the Nahash, Simeon and Himuka, they are suddenly attacked by Japanese troops.
10	"The Young Successor"; Transliteration: "Wakaki Denshō-sha" (Japanese: 若き伝承者)	June 4, 2018
Ramon swears to protect Erika as he leads her into the lane ways to escape from the Japanese soldiers and a German officer. Elsewhere, Pan Yu Ling is also pursued, but when she is cornered, Kenshiro arrives and takes care of the Japanese soldiers. Meanwhile Ramon decoys the German officer by wearing Erika's blue coat. He is caught and fights back, he is no match for the officer. Tian Xue-Fang watches the events unfolding and is seen by Ye who doesn't recognize him, so he pretends to be his own brother, Tian Xue-Yun. Simeon and Himuka appear and reveal that the German officer is in fact their agent Shamura who takes Ramon captive. Tian Xue-Fang then encounters a robed woman with pole cross tattoo, searching for Liu Fei Yan and claiming that he is her brother. Meanwhile, Zi Ying reports Ramon's capture to Kenshiro's group.
11	"Heaven Dipper Sacred Yin Fist"; Transliteration: "Sorato Sei In Ken" (Japanese: 天斗聖陰拳)	June 11, 2018
Kenshiro heads to a ruined temple near the west gate to save Ramon and meets Shamura. Meanwhile Erika has taken Fei Yan's jewel to exchange for Ramon's freedom, so Yu Ling leaves with Yasaka to find her. Erika frees Ramon but he warns her that Shamura's style steals the power of his opponent, something that Kenshiro begins to realize as they fight. However, Kenshiro overcomes Shamura's increased power and then kills him by striking the seven pressure points of death. Meanwhile, as Erika negotiates with Simeon for the release of Ramon, Kenshiro arrives and he and Simeon face off against each other.
12	"Fists of Pengyou"; Transliteration: "Hōyū o Omou Ken" (Japanese: 朋友を想う拳)	June 18, 2018
Kenshiro and Simeon trade insults, and after the first attack, Kenshiro realizes that Simeon killed Guise. Meanwhile, the young woman claiming to be Fei Yan's sister agrees to work with Tian Xue-Fang to find Kenshiro. Kenshiro and Simeon commence their battle, but they are soon interrupted by shelling from Japanese tanks. Simeon leaves, saying that the Nahash prophesy will be fulfilled. As Yu Ling, Yasaka, Kenshiro, Ramon and Erika try to regroup and evacuate the area, the shelling increases. Back at the Japanese army headquarters, the Qing Ban leaders are reported missing and unlikely to have survived the bombing. Elsewhere, the Nahash leaders agree that their plans for re-creation and development of a new world of Genesis is under way.
13	"God's Chosen People"; Transliteration: "Kami ni Eraba Reshi Min" (Japanese: 神に選ばれし民)	October 1, 2018
In Indonesia, four years after the purge of the Qing Ban, Dutch soldiers intimidate locals while looking for Yan Wang and Erika. Kenshiro disposes of them but exposes his location, while Yasaka visits Erika in an orphanage, observed by Dutch troops. Meanwhile, officer Van Der Kolk carries out murderous clinical trials to create ultimate soldiers at a Dutch outpost. In their secret headquarters, supporters of Migado Migadol, including Van Der Kolk, listen to Simeon announce his plan to re-create the world according to their prophesy. Back in town, the woman claiming to be the sister of Liu Fei Yan challenges Kenshiro.
14	"Admiration for a Brother"; Transliteration: "Gikei e no Akogare" (Japanese: 義兄への憧れ)	October 8, 2018
Liu Fei Yan's sister, Fei He, attacks Kenshiro as she believes he killed Liu Fei Yan, but he does not fight back. She explains that 8 years ago, as an orphaned petty thief, she encountered Liu Fei Yan and eventually traveled with him for 4 years as his apprentice. When she reached Shanghai, she was told by Tian Xue-Fang that Kenshiro had killed her adopted "brother". Meanwhile, a group of Van Der Kolk's superhuman ultimate soldiers attack the orphanage to abduct Erika, but are delayed by Yasaka until Kenshiro and a Yu Ling arrive. Together they defeat the ultimate soldiers and Kenshiro releases them from their internal torment to grant them a peaceful death. Yu Ling and Liu Fei He escape with Erika and the other children just as Van Der Kolk arrives and prepares to attack Kenshiro.
15	"The Prophecy That Came True"; Transliteration: "Genjitsu ni Natta Yogen" (Japanese: 現実になった予言)	October 15, 2018
Kolk thinks he has immobilized Kenshiro, but painfully realizes that has not. In an effort to defeat Kenshiro, Kolk injects his own serum into himself to increase his strength and speed, but to no avail. Kenshiro immobilizes him and Kolk reveals that he is a descendant of the Nahash people, planning to recreate the world with Migadol's Thunderbolts and Erika's memories are the key. Meanwhile, Simeon approaches the hideout of Liu Fei He, Erika and the other children but is initially stopped by Yasaka. However Simeon's superior power overwhelms Yasaka, and he abducts Erika and the unconscious Yasaka. Back at their secret headquarters, the Nahash revere Erika as Migadol in accordance with their prophesy which states that the chosen child will receive Migadol's thunderbolts from the heavens.
16	"Migadol's Thunderbolts"; Transliteration: "Migadoru no Kaminari" (Japanese: ミガドルの雷)	October 22, 2018
Pan Yu Ling tells Fei He that Yasaka killed Liu Fei Yan, but that his dying words were to not seek revenge, however she has trouble reconciling this information. Meanwhile the Nahash priests try to extract information about Migadol's thunderbolts from Erika, a nuclear fission device designed by her father. A flashback shows how Erika's father made her promise to keep the information secret before he died and Fei Yan took Erika to safety. Tian Xue-Fang and Hippo offer to help Pan Yu Ling against their common enemy, the Nahash and she accepts. Fei He intercepts them as they leave, asserting that they plan to double-cross Pan Yu Ling, so she blackmails them into helping her find Yasaka. Meanwhile Yasaka realizes that Erika is being kept prisoner in the same building.
17	"Thoughts That Never Cross"; Transliteration: "Majiwaranu Omoi" (Japanese: 交わらぬ想い)	October 29, 2018
Tian Xue-Fang and Hippo tell Fei He that a Dutch officer was involved in smuggling opium for Van Der Kolk's research. Fei He approaches the Dutch officer in a bar, seeking information about Van Der Kolk's whereabouts, but when she hits him, he begs for more punishment before he will tell her. Fei He then passes the information to Yu Ling and Kenshiro. Meanwhile at the Nahash headquarters, Erika is brought before the chained Yasaka to encourage her to reveal her father's plans for Migadol's thunderbolts and Yasaka breaks his bonds, but is struck down by Simeon who pressures Erika whom he calls Migadol, to talk. As Simeon prepares to destroy Yasaka, Erika accepts that she is Migadol and claims her right to sit on the throne at Nohal Naha and agrees to reveal her father's plans. Suddenly Kenshiro bursts through the ceiling and confronts Simeon.
18	"The Setting Sun of the Nahash People"; Transliteration: "Nahashu no Rakujitsu" (Japanese: ナハシュの落日)	November 5, 2018
Kenshiro trades insults with Simeon and then engages him in battle. Meanwhile Himuka takes Erika and extracts from her the location of the Nahash jewels which are in Japan. Meanwhile the battle between Kenshiro and Simeon continues, with Simeon surprised at Kenshiro's resistance and assertion that the Heaven Dipper Sacred Yin Fist is stale and has not progressed like the continually evolving Divine Fist of the North Star. Eventually Kenshiro prevails, shattering Simeon's dreams for fulfillment of the Nahash prophesy. Elsewhere within the complex, Himuka savagely beats Yasaka who refuses to give up, then Fei He arrives to challenge Himuka, but Yasaka intervenes and takes a punishing blow.
19	"Men Who Scatter and Die"; Transliteration: "Chiri Iku Kan" (Japanese: 散り逝く漢)	November 12, 2018
Tian Xue-Fang and Hippo find their way into the control room of the Nahash headquarters, and Tain accidentally presses a self destruct button. Before Himuka can kill Yasaka, an explosion rips through the building. Yasaka saves Erika and Fei He and asks her to look after Erika, before he dies, buried under rubble. Himuka finds the injured Simeon and accuses him of naivety and declares that he plans to use the Migadol's thunderbolts himself. Incredulous, Simeon recalls how years ago Simeon swore fealty to him and together they studied the four pillars of the Heaven Dipper: stealing, accumulating, rebinding and unbinding. Confronted by Himuka's ambition and betrayal, Simeon destroys himself as punishment for being deceived.
20	"The Path of Kasumi Kenshin"; Transliteration: "Kasumi Ken Kokoro no Michi" (Japanese: 霞拳心の道)	November 19, 2018
Himuka visits Ramon and demands the two jewels that Yasaka gave to him four years ago. Ramon's father Tenshin reveals that Himuka's real identity is Kasumi Kenshin, Ramon's adopted brother. Tenshin taught Kenshin Hokuto Shinken even though he thought his temperament was unsuitable. Then one day, their housekeeper Marie, whom Kenshin secretly loved, was killed in a bombardment and he retaliated with extreme force. He then wandered the world and learned the Heaven Dipper Sacred Yin Fist, but while being hunted by the Nahash for betraying them, he fell from a cliff. Tenshin recovered Kenshin, but he sealed away his memories using pressure points. Now Tenshin again tries to seal away his former pupil's strength, but Himuka is too powerful and kills Tenshin, his former master.
21	"Destined to Die Together"; Transliteration: "Shi au Unmei" (Japanese: 死合う運命)	November 26, 2018
Following Yasaka's funeral, Erika is diagnosed with potential brain damage, meanwhile she asks Fei He to tell her about Fei Yan. Later, Ramon arrives with the two jewels and gives them to Kenshiro and Yu Lig for safekeeping. In a flashback, Kenshiro recalls his time years earlier training with Kenshin and the threat he posed then, and possibly in the future. Suddenly Kenshin launches an attack demanding Erika, but Kenshiro comes out to face him in what may be the battle for his life.
22	"Life of the Successor"; Transliteration: "Uketsugu Ikizama" (Japanese: 受け継ぐ生き様)	December 3, 2018
Kenshiro and Kenshin fundamentally disagree about the future of humanity, with Kenshin believing that a complete re-genesis is required. Kenshiro then has to defend himself against Kenshin's powerful combined techniques attacks of Hokuto Shinken and Tento Seiin Ken. To save Kenshiro, Erika offers Kenshin the jewels, and she leaves with him, but not before he strikes Kenshiro's Shinkensutsu pressure point which will cause him to die within three days. Kenshiro asks Romon to strike his Shinreidai pressure point to prolong his life but at the cost of extreme agony. Meanwhile, Fei Yan proposes that they all go to Nohal Naha in an attempt to stop Kenshin. Romon declares his love for Fei He, but she doesn't hear him, intent on following the way of Hokuto Shinken. Fei Yan spends their last night together with Kenshiro.
23	"Erika Arendt, the Lone Girl"; Transliteration: "Hitori no shōjo Erika. Arento" (Japanese: ひとりの少女エリカ. アレント)	December 10, 2018
Erika accuses Kenshin of exploiting the Nahash and their prophesy for his own gain and she attempts to destroy herself and the temple but is easily thwarted by Kenshin. Kenshin then strikes a pressure point on her head to force her to reveal her father's plans for the nuclear fission device. Suddenly Kenshiro, Ramon and Fei Yan arrive and stop the process. Kenshiro uses the Nil-Thought Rebirth technique to strike Kenshin thereby avoiding avoid his counterattacks while Ramon and Fei Yan escape with Erika whose memory has been erased. With Erika removed, Kenshiro again engages Kenshin in battle.
24	"The Man Named Kasumi Kenshiro"; Transliteration: "Kasumi Kenshirō to iu Kan" (Japanese: 霞拳志郎と云う漢)	December 17, 2018
Kenshin attacks Kenshiro with a barrage of punishing blows, then evokes Black Cave Heavenly Death which envelops Kenshiro in darkness. However even within the darkness, Kenshiro's pengyou, Charles de Guise, Liu Fei Yan and Yasaka light the way for him and he finds his way back to Kenshin. Kenshiro utilizes the ultimate technique of Blue Dragon Heavenly Silk as he and Kenshin battle each other with their fists until Kenshiro lands a punishing blow on Kenshin's chest. They admit their grudging respect for each other and dedication to achieving their ideals, but Kenshin tricks Kenshiro into delivering a killing blow finally ending his dream for a re-genesis. Later, Fei Yan returns to the orphanage with Fei He and Erika, and Ramon continues his training. Elsewhere, Kensiro lays down on a rocky outcrop above the clouds, gazing at the blue sky as he smokes his last cigarette.
