= Kazuo =

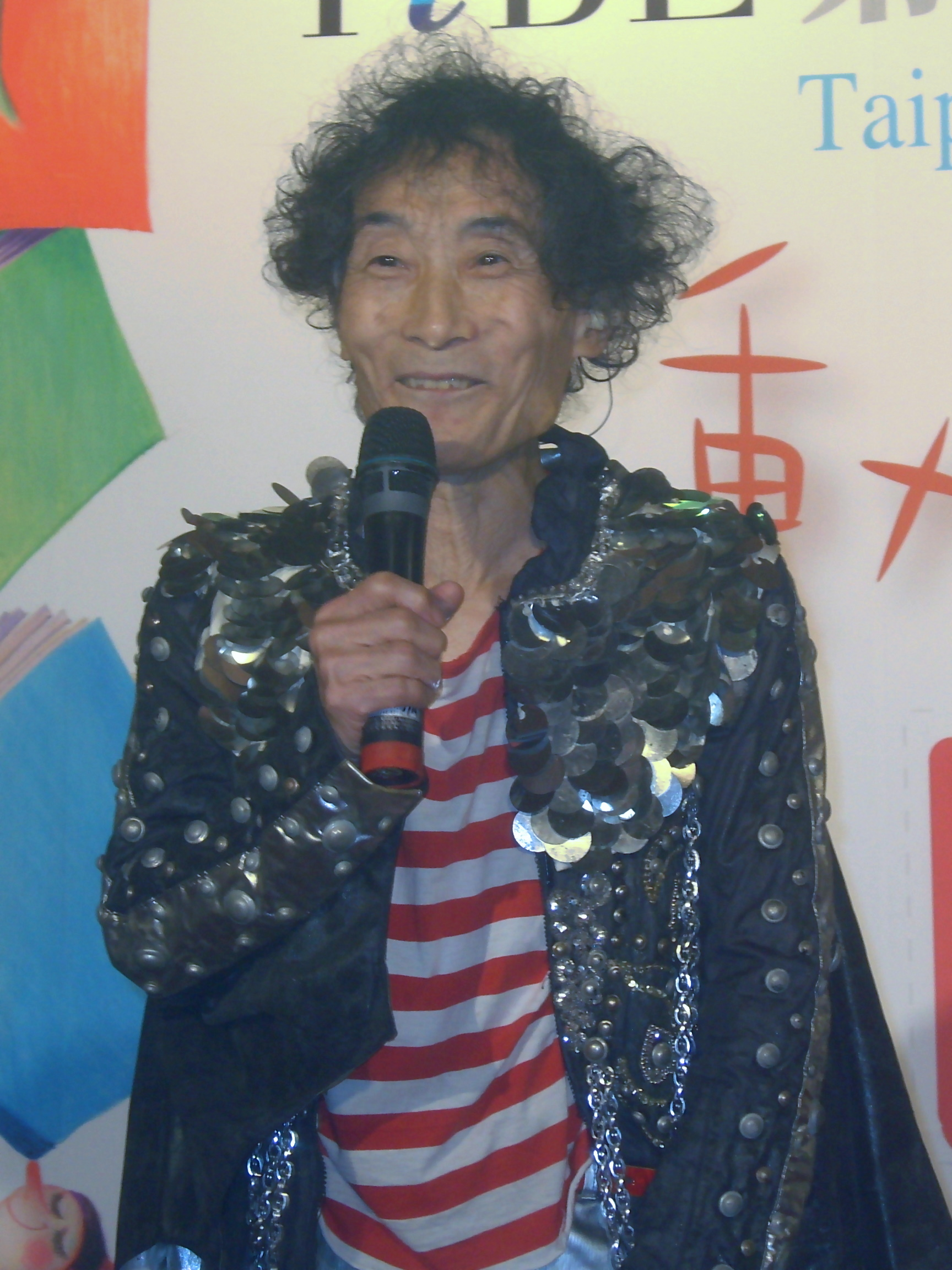
- Kazuo Umezu, Japanese mangaka
- Gender: Male
- Language: Japanese

Origin
- Origin: Japanese
- Meaning: Different meanings depending on the kanji used.
- Region of origin: Japan

Kazuo (カズオ, かずお) is a masculine Japanese given name.

== Possible spellings ==
It has several written forms, and the meaning depends on the characters used (usually kanji, but sometimes hiragana). Common forms include:

- 一雄: first son, first in leadership/excellence
- 一夫: first son
- 一男: first man/male
- 和夫: harmonious/peaceful man
- 和男: harmonious/peaceful man
- かずお (hiragana)
- カズオ (katakana)

== People with the name ==
- Kazuo Abe (阿部 一男; born 1935), Japanese sport wrestler
- Kazuo Aichi (愛知 和男; 1937–2024), Japanese politician
- Kazuo Aoki (青木 一男; 1889–1982), Japanese government minister during the Second Sino-Japanese War, and into World War II
- Kazuo Azuma (東 和男; born 1955), Japanese shogi player
- Kazuo Chiba (千葉 和雄; 1940–2015), Japanese aikido teacher
- Kazuo Dan (檀 一雄; 1912–1976), Japanese novelist and poet
- Fukumoto Kazuo (福本 和夫; 1894–1983), Japanese Marxist
- Kazuo Funaki (舟木 一夫; born 1944), Japanese Enka singer
- Kazuo Hamasaki (一夫 浜崎; 1925–2005), Canadian artist
- Kazuo Hara (原 一男; born 1945), Japanese documentary film director
- Kazuo Harada (原田 一男; died 1998), anime producer, audio director, and sound effects director
- Kazuo Hasegawa (長谷川 一夫; 1908–1984), Japanese film and stage actor
- Kazuo Hashimoto (橋本 和芙; died 1995), late Japanese inventor of Caller ID and the telephone answering machine, including the ansafone
- Kazuo Hatoyama (鳩山 和夫; 1856–1911), patriarchal head of the prominent Japanese Hatoyama political family
- Kazuo Hayashi (林 一夫; born 1945), Japanese actor and voice actor
- Kazuo Hirai (平井 一夫; born 1964), President/CEO of Sony Computer
- Kazuo Hiramatsu (平松 一夫; 1947–2020), accounting scholar, president of Kwansei Gakuin University
- Kazuo Hirotomo (弘友 和夫; born 1944), Japanese politician
- Hirotsu Kazuo (広津 和郎; 1891–1968), Japanese novelist and literary critic active in the Shōwa period of Japan
- Kazuo Ichinohe (一戸 和男; born 1941), Japanese voice actor (stage name Shin Aomori (青森 伸))
- Kazuo Igarashi (五十嵐 和男; born 1946), Japanese aikidoka
- Kazuo Ikehiro (池広 一夫; 1929–2025), Japanese film director
- Kazuo Imanishi (今西 和男; 1941–2026), Japanese football player and manager
- Kazuo Inamori (稲盛 和夫; 1932–2022), Japanese businessman
- Kazuo Inoue (井上 和郎; born 1981), Japanese cyclist
- Kazuo Ishiguro (石黒一雄, born 1954), British author
- Kazuo Iwama, multiple people
- Kazuo Iwamura (岩村 和朗; 1939-2024), Japanese children's book author
- Kazuo Kadonaga (角永 和夫; born 1946), contemporary Japanese sculptor
- Kazuo Kamimura (上村 一夫; 1940–1986), Japanese manga artist
- Kazuo Kanayama (金山 和雄; born 1952), Japanese golfer
- Kazuo Kawai (川井 一男), Japanese table tennis player
- Kazuo Kimura (木村 一夫; 1909–?), Japanese high jumper
- Kazuo Kitagawa (北側 一雄; born 1953), Minister of Agriculture, Forestry and Fisheries in the Japanese Cabinet of Junichiro Koizumi
- Kazuo Kitamura (北村 和夫; 1927–2007), Japanese actor
- Kazuo Kobayashi (小林 一男; 1908–?), Japanese diver
- Kazuo Koike (小池 一夫; 1936–2019), manga artist
- Komizu Kazuo (小水 一男; born 1946), Japanese film director
- Kazuo Kubokawa (窪川 一雄; 1903–1943), Japanese astronomer
- Kazuo Kumakura (熊倉 一雄; 1927–2015), Japanese actor, voice actor and theatre director
- Kazuo Kuroki (黒木 和雄; 1930–2006), Japanese film director
- Kazuo Manabe (真部 一男; 1952–2007), Japanese shogi player
- Kazuo Matsuda (松田 一夫; born 1941), Japanese ice hockey player
- Kazuo Matsui (松井稼頭央; born 1975), Japanese baseball player
- Kazuo Misaki (三崎 和雄; born 1976), Japanese professional mixed martial arts fighter and former judoka
- Kazuo Miyagawa (宮川 一夫; 1908–1999), Japanese cinematographer
- Kazuo Mizutani (水谷 一生; 1899–1949), Chief of Staff of Japanese Imperial Guard during the close of World War II
- Kazuo Mori (森 一生; 1911–1989), Japanese film director
- Kazuo Nagano (永野 一男; 1952–1985), Japanese fraudster
- Kazuo Nakamura (1926–2002), Japanese-Canadian painter and sculptor
- Kazuo Nakamura (basketball) (中村 和雄; born 1940), Japanese basketball coach
- Kazuo Nakanishi (中西 一男; 1922–2003), briefly the leader of the Yamaguchi-gumi yakuza syndicate in the chaotic years of the Yama-Ichi War
- Kazuo Nishii (西井 一夫; 1946–2001), Japanese magazine editor and photography critic
- Kazuo Noda (野田 一雄; 1908–?), Japanese swimmer
- Kazuo Oga (男鹿 和雄; born 1952), Japanese art director
- Kazuo Ohno (大野 一雄; 1906–2010), Japanese dancer associated with Butoh
- Kazuo Oka (岡 和男; 1948–2021), Japanese voice actor
- Kazuo Okada (岡田 和生; born 1942), Japanese billionaire businessman, and art collector
- Kazuo Okamatsu (岡松 和夫; 1931–2012), Japanese philologist and novelist
- Kazuo Okamura (岡村 一夫; 1911–1973), Japanese-American professional wrestler
- Kazuo Ozaki (尾崎 加寿夫; born 1960), Japanese footballer
- Kazuo Saito (斉藤 和夫; born 1951), Japanese footballer and manager
- Kazuo Saito (athlete) (斎藤 和夫; born 1942), Japanese racewalker
- Kazuo Sakamaki (酒巻和男; 1918–1999), first prisoner of war held by the US in World War II
- Kazuo Sakurada (桜田 一男; 1948–2020), known as Mr. Sakurada, retired Japanese professional wrestler
- Kazuo Sato (disambiguation), multiple people
- Kazuo Shii (志位 和夫; born 1954), Japanese politician
- Kazuo Shimizu (清水 和男; born 1975), Japanese footballer
- Kazuo Shimizu (wrestler) (清水 一夫; born 1954), Japanese sport wrestler
- Kazuo Shinohara (篠原 一男; 1925–2006), Japanese architect
- Kazuo Shiraga (白髪 一雄; 1924–2008), Japanese abstract painter
- Kazuo Sugimoto (杉本 和陽; born 1991), Japanese shogi player
- Kazuo Takahashi (高橋 和生; born 1969), Japanese mixed martial artist
- Kazuo Taoka (田岡 一雄; 1913–1981), Godfather of the Yamaguchi-gumi yakuza syndicate
- Kazuo Tokumitsu (徳光 和夫; born 1941), Japanese TV presenter and announcer
- Kazuo Tsukuda (佃 和夫; born 1943), chairman of Mitsubishi Heavy Industries
- Kazuo Ueda (植田 和男; born 1951), 32nd Governor of the Bank of Japan
- Kazuo Ueda (上田和夫; born 1942 or 1943), Yiddishist
- Kazuo Umezu (楳図 かずお; 1936–2024), Japanese manga artist
- Kazuo Wada (和田 一夫; 1929–2019), Japanese businessman
- Kazuo Yamada (山田 一雄; 1912–1991), Japanese conductor
- Kazuo Yamaguchi (山口 一男; born 1946), Japanese sociologist
- Kazuo Yokoyama (横山 和生; born 1993), Japanese jockey

=== Fictional characters ===
- Kazuo Tengan, the antagonist of Danganronpa
- Kazuo Nakano, character in Yudetamago's manga series Kinnikuman
- Kazuo Saki, brother of the Shredder from the 1987–1996 animated TV series, Teenage Mutant Ninja Turtles
- Kazuo Uzuki, fictional baseball player that Topps created as an April Fools' Day hoax
- Kazuo Kiriyama, the primary antagonist of Battle Royale
- Kazuo Makunoichi, fictional character in Hajime no Ippo

=== Video games ===
- Kazuo or Go! Sudoku, is the name for the Japanese release of the PlayStation Portable puzzle game
- Kazuo Akuji is the leader of the Ronin in the Saints Row 2
- Kazuo Hoshiro is the leader of the Investigation Team of Sweet Home (video game)
