= Kadonaga =

Kadonaga (written: 門永 or 角永) is a Japanese surname. Notable people with the surname include:

- James Kadonaga, American biologist
- Kazuo Kadonaga (角永 和夫, born 1946), Japanese sculptor
- Yoshinori Kadonaga (門永 吉典, born 1947), Japanese swimmer
