= Kazuma =

Origin
- Origin: Japanese
- Meaning: Different meanings depending on the kanji used

Kazuma (written: 一馬, 一真, 一眞, 和馬, 和真, 和磨, 和麻, 壱馬, 千真 or カズマ in katakana) is a masculine Japanese given name. Notable people with the name include:

- Kazuma Eekman, Dutch-Japanese artist
- Kazuma Horie (堀江 一眞; born 1976), Japanese voice actor
- Kazuma Ieiri (家入 一真; born 1978), Japanese chief executive
- Kazuma Ikarino (碇野 壱馬; born 1986), Japanese footballer
- Kazuma Inoue (井上 和馬; born 1990), Japanese footballer
- Kazuma Irifune (入船 和真; born 1986), Japanese footballer
- Kazuma Kamachi (鎌池 和馬), pseudonymous Japanese writer
- Kazuma Kaneko (金子 一馬; born 1964), Japanese video game artist and game designer
- Kazuma Kawamura (川村 壱馬; born 1997), Japanese singer, member of The Rampage from Exile Tribe
- Kazuma Kaya (萱 和磨; born 1996), Japanese artistic gymnast
- Kazuma Kita (北 一真; born 1981), Japanese footballer
- Kazuma Kodaka (こだか 和麻; born 1969), Japanese manga artist
- Kazuma Matsushita (松下 和磨; born 1982), Japanese footballer
- Kazuma Mitchell (ミッチェル 和馬; born 2000), Japanese-American singer, songwriter and model
- Kazuma Murata (村田 和麻; born 1991), Japanese field hockey player
- Kazuma Okamoto (岡本 和真; born 1996), Japanese baseball player
- Kazuma Ōseto (大瀬戸 一馬; born 1994), Japanese sprinter
- Kazuma Sano (佐野 和真; born 1989), Japanese actor
- Kazuma Shinjō (新城 カズマ), Japanese science fiction writer
- Kazuma Suzuki (鈴木 一真), Japanese actor, film director, fashion designer and model
- Kazuma Takai (高井 和馬; born 1994), Japanese footballer
- Kazuma Takayama (高山 和真; born 1996), Japanese footballer
- Kazuma Watanabe (渡邉 千真; born 1986), Japanese footballer
- Kazuma Watanabe (motorcycle racer) (渡辺 一馬; born 1990), Japanese motorcycle racer
- Kazuma Yamaguchi (山口 一真; born 1996), Japanese footballer

== Fictional characters ==
- Kazuma Azuma, a character in the manga series Yakitate!! Japan
- Kazuma Kenzaki, a character in the television series Kamen Rider Blade
- Kazuma Kendate, a character in the television series Kamen Rider Decade
- Kazuma Kiryu, a character in the video game series Yakuza
- Kazuma Kuvaru, a minor character in the video game series BlazBlue
- Kazuma Asogi, a character in the video game series Ace Attorney
- Kazuma Sakamoto, a character in the video game Cave Story
- Kazuma Kuwabara, a character in the manga series YuYu Hakusho
- Kazuma Sohma, a character in the manga series Fruits Basket
- Kazuma, a character in the manga series s-CRY-ed
- Kazuma, a character in the manga series Noragami
- Kazuma Kagato, a character in the manga series Tenchi Muyo!
- Kazuma Mikura, a character in the manga series Air Gear
- Kazuma Sato, a character in the light novel series KonoSuba
- Kazuma Yagami, a character in the manga series Kaze no Stigma
- Kazuma Shouji, a character in the media franchise Cardfight!! Vanguard
- Kazuma Mamizuka (狸塚 数馬) a character in the manga and anime School Babysitters, the twin brother of Takuma Mamizuka
