= Kazuyo =

- Gender: Female

Origin
- Origin: Japanese
- Meaning: Different meanings depending on the kanji used

Kazuyo (written: 和代, 和世 or 一代) is a feminine Japanese given name. Notable people with the name include:

- Kazuyo Aoki (青木 和代; born 1947), Japanese voice actress
- Kazuyo Hayashida (林田 和代; born 1953), Japanese women's basketball player
- Kazuyo Inaba (稲葉 和世; born 1959), Japanese swimmer
- Kazuyo Katsuma (勝間 和代; born 1968), Japanese businesswoman
- Kazuyo Matsui (松居 一代; born 1957), Japanese actress
- Kazuyo Sejima (妹島 和世; born 1956), Japanese architect
