= Takamiya Station =

Takamiya Station (高宮駅) is the name of two train stations in Japan:

- Takamiya Station (Fukuoka)
- Takamiya Station (Shiga)
