= Kasumi, Jajce =

Kasumi
- Village
- Location within Bosnia and Herzegovina
- Coordinates: 44.256244°N 17.2859452°E
- Country: Bosnia and Herzegovina
- Entity: Federation of Bosnia and Herzegovina
- Canton: Central Bosnia
- Municipality: Jajce

Area
  - Total: 0.51 sq mi (1.31 km^{2})

Population (2013)
  - Total: 219
  - Density: 433/sq mi (167/km^{2})
- Time zone: UTC+1 (CET)
  - Summer (DST): UTC+2 (CEST)

Kasumi is a village in the municipality of Jajce, Bosnia and Herzegovina.

== Demographics ==
According to the 2013 census, its population was 219.

Ethnicity in 2013
Ethnicity	Number	Percentage
Bosniaks	205	93.6%
Croats	1	0.5%
other/undeclared	13	5.9%
Total	219	100%
