= Kazuo Tsukuda =

Japanese businessman

- Born: 1943 (age 82–83)
- Education: University of Tokyo
- Occupation: Chairman
- Employer: Mitsubishi Heavy Industries

Kazuo Tsukuda (佃 和夫, Tsukuda Kazuo) is the chairman of Mitsubishi Heavy Industries, one of the core companies of the Mitsubishi Group.

Born in 1943. Tsukuda graduated from the School of Engineering of the University of Tokyo in 1968 with an advanced degree in marine mechanical engineering and joined Mitsubishi Heavy Industries (MHI) immediately after graduation. After years with the company he eventually became deputy general manager of Takasago Machinery Works and, later, general manager of Nagoya Machinery Works.

Tsukuda became a member of the board of directors of MHI in June 1999. In April 2002 he was appointed a managing director and the general manager for the Global Strategic Planning & Operations Headquarters. In June 2003, Tsukuda became president of MHI. Tsukuda became a director and an advisor of MHI in April 2013 and an advisor of MHI in June 2013.
