= Kazuo Sato =

Kazuo Sato may refer to:

- Kazuo Sato (skier) (佐藤 和男, born 1937), Japanese cross-country skier
- Kazuo Sato (weightlifter) (佐藤 和夫, born 1970), Japanese weightlifter
