= Kasumi (given name) =

- Gender: Female

Origin
- Origin: Japanese
- Meaning: Different meanings depending on the kanji used

Kasumi (かすみ, カスミ) is a feminine Japanese given name.

== Written forms ==
Kasumi can be written using different kanji characters and can mean:

- 霞, "mist"
- 香澄, "incense, lucidity"
- 佳純, "excellent, purity"
- 架純, "mount, purity"
- 加純, "addition, purity"
- 花純, "flower, purity"

The given name can also be written in hiragana or katakana.

== People ==
- Kasumi Arimura (有村 架純; born 1993), Japanese actress
- Kasumi Ishikawa (石川 佳純; born 1993), Japanese table tennis player
- Kasumi Nakane (仲根 かすみ; born 1982), Japanese model, gravure idol and actress
- Kasumi Nishihara (西原 加純; born 1989), Japanese long-distance runner
- Kasumi Saeki (佐伯 霞; born 1996), Japanese boxer
- Kasumi Suzuki (鈴木 かすみ; born 1990), Japanese actress
- Kasumi Takahashi (born 1980), Japanese-Australian rhythmic gymnast
- Kasumi Yamaya (山谷 花純; born 1996), Japanese actress and model

== Fictional characters ==
- Kasumi (Dead or Alive) (かすみ), a character in the video game series Dead or Alive
- Kasumi (カスミ), better known in English as Misty, a character in the media franchise Pokémon
- Kasumi, an alternative name of Cassandra Cain, a character in DC Comics
- Kasumi Goto, a character in the video game Mass Effect 2
- Kasumi Gyoubu (霞 刑部), a character in the novel The Kouga Ninja Scrolls
- Kasumi Hanasaki (花咲 カスミ), a character in the anime series Tama and Friends
- Kasumi Kenshiro (霞 拳志郎), the protagonist of Fist of the Blue Sky and the uncle of Kenshiro, also known as Yan Wang
- Kasumi Momochi (百地 霞), a character in the tokusatsu series Shuriken Sentai Ninninger
- Kasumi Nakasu (中須 かすみ), a character in the media franchise Love Live! Nijigasaki High School Idol Club
- Kasumi Tendo (天道 かすみ), a character in the manga series Ranma ½
- Kasumi Todoh (藤堂 香澄), a character in the video game series Art of Fighting
- Kasumi Toyama (戸山 香澄), a fictional character and the leader, lead singer, and rhythm guitarist of Poppin'Party in the musical anime and media franchise BanG Dream!
- Kasumi Yashiro (社 霞), a character in the visual novel Muv-Luv Alternative
- Kasumi Yoshizawa (芳澤 かすみ), a character in the video game Persona 5 Royal
- Kasumi Nakano (中野 かすみ), a character in the video game Fallout 4 DLC "Far Harbor"
- Kasumi (カスミ), a character in Bofuri.
- Kasumi Miwa (三輪霞), a character in the manga and anime series Jujutsu Kaisen.
- Kasumi (カスミ), better known as Haze/Fan la Norne in the video game Xenoblade Chronicles 2
