= Kazuma Shinjō =

Japanese science fiction writer

Kazuma Shinjō (新城 カズマ, Shinjō Kazuma) is a Japanese science fiction writer whose work was first published in 1991. In 2006. Kazuma won the Seiun Award for Summer / Time / Traveler.

== Selected works ==
- Hōrai gakuen (蓬莱学園), 1991–1997
- Marion & Co. (マリオン&Co.), 1997
- Kurou denshō (狗狼伝承), 1998–2001
- Hoshino, baberu (星の、バベル), 2002
- Jesters' Galaxy (ジェスターズ・ギャラクシー), 2002–2004
- Isuberu no sen fu (イスベルの戦賦), 2003
- Summer / Time / Traveler (サマー/タイム/トラベラー), 2005
- Light Novel „Chō“ Nyūmon (ライトノベル「超」入門), 2006
