= Japanese destroyer Kasumi =

Two ships of the Japanese Navy have been named Kasumi:

- Japanese destroyer Kasumi (1902), an Akatsuki-class destroyer launched in 1902 and broken up in 1920.
- Japanese destroyer Kasumi (1937), an Asashio-class destroyer launched in 1937 and sunk in 1945.
