= Kazue =

- Gender: Female

Origin
- Origin: Japanese
- Meaning: Different meanings depending on the kanji used

Other names
- Alternative spelling: 和江

Kazue (written: 一恵, 一枝, 和恵, 和枝, 和永, 良恵 or かずえ in hiragana) is a feminine Japanese given name. Notable people with the name include:

- Kazue Fukiishi (吹石 一恵; born 1982), Japanese actress
- Kazue Hanyu (羽生 和永; born 1950), Japanese gymnast
- Kazue Hayakawa (早川 一枝; born 1947), Japanese swimmer
- Kazue Ikura (伊倉 一恵; born 1959), Japanese voice actress
- Kazue Imahoko (今鉾 一恵; born 1982), Japanese weightlifter
- Kazue Ito (softball) (伊藤 良恵; born 1977), Japanese softball player
- Kazue Itoh (伊藤 かずえ; born 1966), Japanese actress
- Kazue Kato (加藤和恵; born 1980), Japanese manga artist
- Kazue Kojima (小島 一枝; 1916–1992), Japanese swimmer
- Kazue Komiya (小宮 和枝; born 1952), Japanese voice actress
- Kazue Nagahori (永堀 一恵; born 1968), Japanese professional wrestler
- Kazue Nanjo (南條 和恵; born 1972), Japanese judoka
- Kazue Sawai (沢井 一恵; 1941–2026), Japanese musician
- Kazue Takahashi (高橋 和枝; 1929–1999), Japanese voice actress
