= Kazumi Arikawa =

Japanese jewellery collector (born 1952)

- 有川 一三
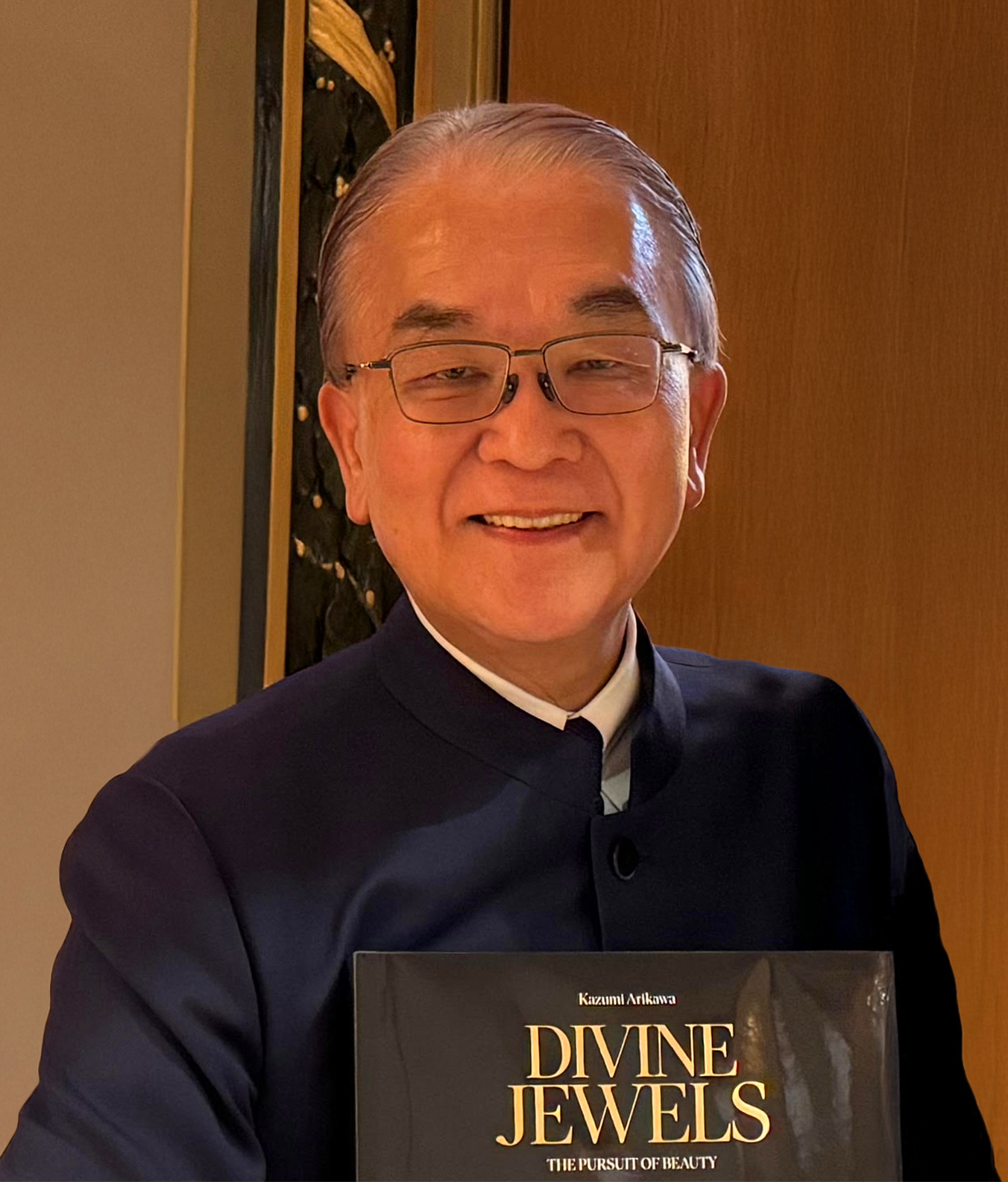
- At L'ÉCOLE, Paris, 17 September 2024
- Born: March 24, 1952 (age 74); Kitakyushu, Fukuoka, Japan
- Education: Waseda University Faculty of Political Science and Economics
- Occupations: Jewellery art researcher, collector, businessperson
- Organization(s): Albion Art Co., Ltd.; Albion Art Jewellery Institute
- Notable work: Divine Jewels: The Pursuit of Beauty
- Title: President, Albion Art Co., Ltd.; Director, Albion Art Jewellery Institute
- Awards: Chevalier of the Order of Arts and Letters (France)

Kazumi Arikawa (有川 一三 (Arikawa Kazumi); born 24 March 1952) is a Japanese jewellery art researcher, collector and businessperson. He is the president of the Albion Art Jewellery Institute and president of Albion Art Co., Ltd. Arikawa is a member of the International Council of The Metropolitan Museum of Art in New York and has been appointed a Chevalier of the Order of Arts and Letters by the French government. His work as a collector has been featured in international media, including The New York Times and the Financial Times.

== Overview ==
Arikawa has contributed to exhibitions by lending works from his collection and providing sponsorship at major institutions in Japan and overseas. These include The Metropolitan Museum of Art in New York, the Victoria and Albert Museum in London, Qatar Museums, the LOTTE Museum of Art in Seoul, the National Museum of Nature and Science in Tokyo, the Bunkamura Museum of Art in Tokyo, the Tokyo Metropolitan Teien Art Museum, and the Hakone Open-Air Museum.

He has also taken part in international publishing projects, and has given lectures on the history of jewellery art at Tokyo University of the Arts, where he has helped raise public interest in jewellery art through educational activities.

== Biography ==
Arikawa was born in 1952 in Kitakyushu, Fukuoka Prefecture. He attended Doshisha University, but decided to withdraw after meeting a monk. After two and a half years at Daitoku-ji, Arikawa returned to complete his education, graduating from the Faculty of Political Science and Economics at Waseda University in 1977.

In 1985, he founded Albion Art Co., Ltd., a company specialising in jewellery art. In 2003 he became head of the Albion Art Jewellery Institute, a cultural arm of the company devoted to research, exhibitions and public education in jewellery art.

In April 2009 he was appointed Chevalier of the Order of Arts and Letters by the French government in recognition of his contributions to jewellery culture in France and worldwide.In 2019 he became a member of the International Council of The Metropolitan Museum of Art.

== Career and activities ==
Arikawa has described jewellery art as “the final form of art”, pursuing beauty and spirituality through gemstones and precious metals. His research encompasses roughly 5,000 years of human adornment, from Mesopotamian antiquities to contemporary jewellery, with particular attention to the jewellery culture of European courts and aristocracies and to jewellery art in a global art-historical context.

In 2003 he established the Albion Art Jewellery Institute (AAJI) as a cultural division of Albion Art. Through AAJI he has collaborated on numerous exhibitions, including:

- Four Centuries of European Jewellery (2003) at the Tokyo Metropolitan Teien Art Museum and other venues;
- Tiara (2007) at Bunkamura The Museum, Tokyo, and two additional venues;
- Cameo: 2,000 Years of Gem Carving (2008) at the Hakone Open-Air Museum and Fukuoka City Museum;
- Pearls (2010) in Qatar, later shown in Japan as Pearls: Jewels from the Sea at the Hyogo Prefectural Museum of Art;
- The special exhibition Jewels (GEM) at the National Museum of Nature and Science, Tokyo (2022);
- Emerald’s Garden: Exploring the World of Emerald at L'ÉCOLE, School of Jewelry Arts, Shanghai (2024);
- Divine Jewels: The Pursuit of Beauty – Selected pieces from Kazumi Arikawa's collection at L'ÉCOLE, School of Jewelry Arts, Paris.

Through these and other collaborations, Arikawa has played a role in promoting dialogue between jewellery, art and culture on an international scale. His collection and research have been made available to the public through exhibitions and publications, and have been noted for their scholarly as well as cultural value.

== Publications ==
- Kazumi Arikawa, Divine Jewels: The Pursuit of Beauty, Flammarion, 2024.
