= Kazuya Takamiya =

Japanese baseball player

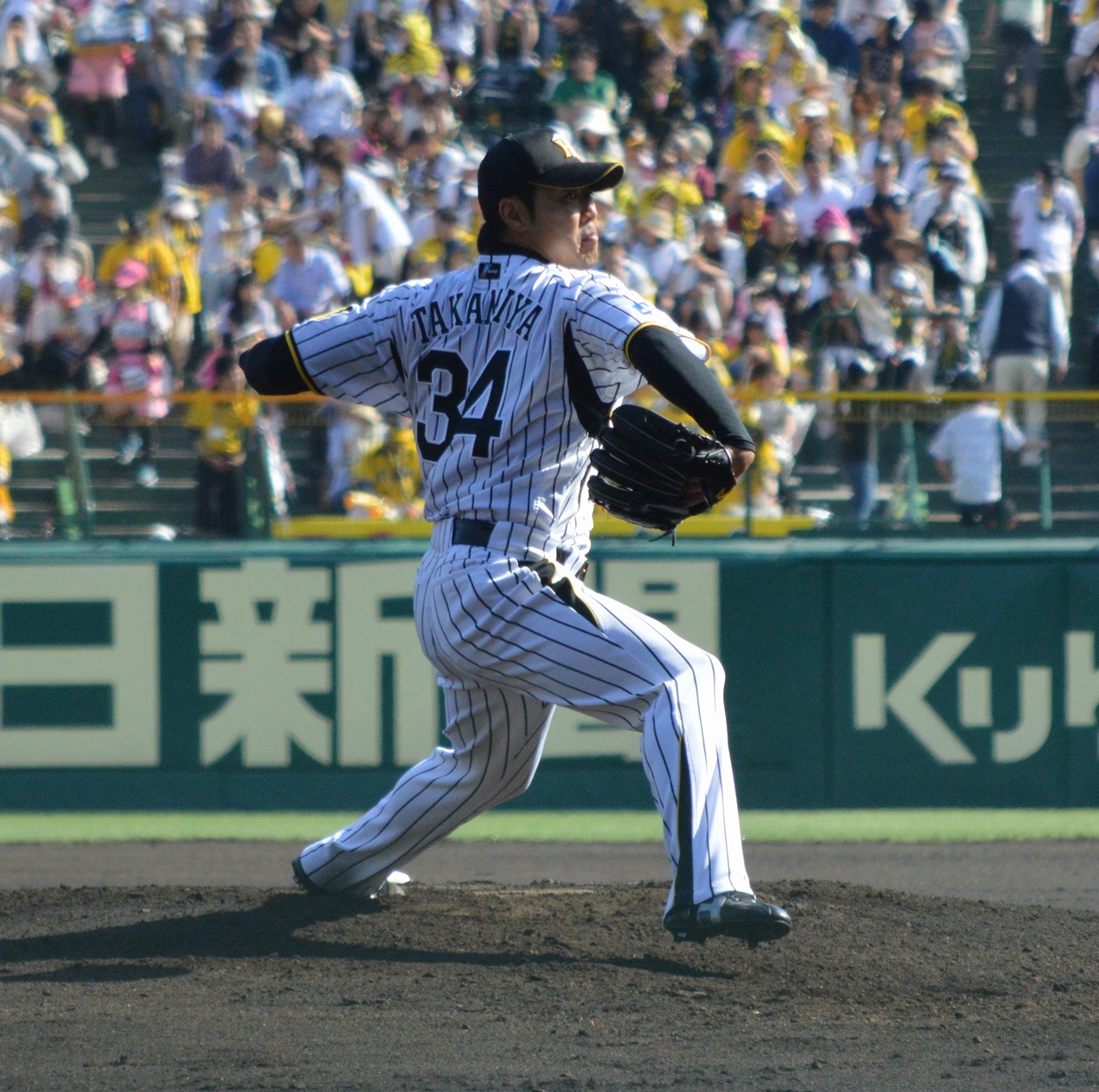
- Takamiya with the Hanshin Tigers
- Pitcher
- Born: December 4, 1981 (age 44)
- Bats: Left Throws: Left

NPB debut
- 2006, for the Yokohama BayStars

NPB statistics (through 2016)
- Win–loss record: 6-8
- ERA: 5.50
- Strikeouts: 133
- Stats at Baseball Reference

Teams
- Yokohama BayStars (2006–2010); Orix Buffaloes (2011–2012); Hanshin Tigers (2013–2017)

Kazuya Takamiya (高宮 和也, born December 4, 1981) is a Japanese professional former baseball pitcher in Japan's Nippon Professional Baseball. He played for the Yokohama BayStars from 2006 to 2010, the Orix Buffaloes in 2011 and 2012, and for the Hanshin Tigers from 2013 to 2017.
