= Kazuo Kadonaga =

Japanese sculptor (born 1946)

Kazuo Kadonaga (角永 和夫, Kadonaga Kazuo; born 1946) is a contemporary Japanese sculptor. He was born in 1946 in Ishikawa, Japan. From a family that owns a cedar forest and lumber mill.

Originally trained as a painter, Kadonaga soon realized that “others painted better”. In his father's sawmill he rediscovered the natural beauty of wood.

His work can be related to two recent art movements in Japan, though he was not directly involved with either. The Gutai, or “concrete” movement of the 1950s and, later, the Mono-ha or “object” group which operates in a way similar to Western “process artists”.

== Wood ==
Kadonaga's earliest works that gained him international attention were made with a veneer slicer to cut cedar logs with the bark removed into long strips the thickness of paper. The strips were then glued back together in the form of the original log. As well as slicing logs, Kadonaga has also carved geometric shapes, and split logs to reveal the grain. Wood is Kadonaga's most extensively used material, which he uses to “explore different ways of looking at a tree, not to take a tree for granted”

== Silk ==
In his silk pieces, Kadonaga builds wooden grids from pine or cedar wood. He then releases on them silkworms that have been fed and readied for making cocoons. The worms then explore the structures Kadonaga made for them, and settle in the different crannies throughout.

Because worms tend to bunch toward the top, and left the bottom of the structures untouched, Kadonaga has previously spent 48 hours periodically turning the grids while the worms roam, tricking them into settling in a more even distribution. The final result was niches filled with the round silkworm cocoons as well as threads of silk left along the frame.

== Paper ==
In his works of paper, Kadonaga uses handmade paper, a traditional Japanese craft. He has it made into unusual shapes such as triangles, strips, oblongs, and stack it wet. While the paper is wet, it is clamped, so as it dries the free sections fluff up while the clamped sections remain flat. (New Yorker, 1987).

== Glass ==
In more recent years Kadonaga has worked extensively with glass, which he forms with the spiral flow of a single stream of molten glass, sustained up to 48 hours. After working with and experimenting with the material, Kadonaga devised a process for pouring the glass through an opening in the top of a custom built, computer controlled kiln. The process is monitored to make sure the structure continues to grow, and a computer keeps the temperature in the kiln constant to avoid cracks or other types of breaks. Otherwise, there is no control over the piece and the glass itself dictate's the work's final form. Once the pour is completed, the works have to cool up to 4 months before being moved.

== Collections ==
Kazuo Kadonaga's art is included in collections such as the Museo de Arte Moderno in Mexico City, the Museum of Modern Art in Toyama, Japan, The Museum of Class in Tacoma, Washington, Rijksmuseum Kroller Muller, in Otterlo, the Netherlands.
