= List of Fist of the Blue Sky characters =

The following is a list of characters from the manga and anime franchise Fist of the Blue Sky (Japanese: 蒼天の拳, Hepburn: Sōten no Ken) by Tetsuo Hara and Buronson. All characters are from the original manga unless otherwise noted.

== Martial artists ==
=== Hokuto Shinken ===
North Dipper Divine Fist" (Japanese: 北斗神拳, Hepburn: Hokuto Shinken; Pinyin: Běidǒu Shénquán). Called "God Fist of the North Star" in the Gutsoon! Entertainment English translation.

Kenshirō Kasumi (霞 拳志郎, Kasumi Kenshirō) Voiced by: Kōichi Yamadera
The main character and 62nd successor to Hokuto Shinken. Known in Shanghai as "Yán Wáng" (閻王, En'ō). An avid smoker, reader, and endowed with an uncanny sense of smell, he places friends above almost everything else (for example, he is not shy about threatening Japanese soldiers into helping him to find Liú Fēi-Yàn during the Battle of Shanghai, telling them that he cares nothing for their war). His fighting technique is similar to that of Toki in Fist of the North Star, in which he fights in a fluid and smooth fighting style. In Japan, he is a lecturer at the Tōwa Women's University and is popular with his students due to his quirky and paternal personality. Despite being depicted as somewhat easy going, as well as comical, he uses the same chilling catch-phrase as his nephew, "You are already dead" (お前はもう死んでいる, Omae wa mō shindeiru), but says it in Chinese, "Nǐ yǐ jīng sǐ le" (traditional Chinese: 儞已經死了; simplified Chinese: 你已经死了), or Niichinsura.
Ramon Kasumi (霞 羅門, Kasumi Ramon) Voiced by: Takashi Kondō (young) / Mugihito (old)
Kenshiro's younger half-brother, who goes on to become the 63rd successor of Hokuto Shinken, otherwise known as Ryūken (リュウケン). He named the infant Kenshiro (from Fist of the North Star) in honor of his brother Kenshiro Kasumi, who were both born with a birthmark shaped as the Big Dipper on their head. He refers to his older brother, Kenshiro, as the "Strongest Hokuto Shinken warrior" who was "mighty as the blue sky above." The young Ramon appears thorough the series, first protecting Aya Kitaoji from hired thugs, later serving as a bodyguard to Pān Yù-Líng against the Tài Hú Bāng during her stay in Japan.
Tesshin Kasumi (霞 鉄心, Kasumi Tesshin)
Father of Kenshirō and Ramon; he was the 61st successor of Hokuto Shinken. As a young man he sought to fight Liú Xuán-Xìn in the "Tenju no Gi" challenge, but Liú had become too old to fight. Tesshin fell in love with Xuán-Xìn's daughter, and they conceived a son, Kenshiro. Tesshin once fought Wèi Ruì-Yīng, founder of Kyokujūji Seiken, to a draw. Tesshin remarked that Ruì-Yīng may have been able to defeat him had he not lost a leg.
Shuken (シュケン)
The founder of Hokuto Shinken, first mentioned in Fist of the North Star. He became an apprentice of Seito Gekken 2,000 years ago, learning its secrets of the Keiraku Hikō pressure points and blending it with the original Hokuto style. In order to fulfill his destiny as foreordained by the Hokuto Sōke priests, he killed the other disciples of Seito Gekken, including his lover Yahma (who it is later revealed actually committed suicide), and established the one successor rule for Hokuto Shinken so that its dangerous secrets would not fall into the wrong hands. However, Kenshiro's battle with Yasaka reveals that there is more to the massacre than first thought, as Shuken had also been shown a vision of the future where the Seito Gekken style becomes nothing more than a weapon of war, and would be the cause of so many atrocities that Shuken felt that he had to destroy the style and seal away his own before it came to that.

=== Hokuto Sankaken ===
The North Dipper Three Family Fists (Japanese: 北斗三家拳, Hepburn: Hokuto Sankaken; Pinyin: Běidǒu Sānjiāquán) are three martial arts styles that branched off from Hokuto Shinken during the Three Kingdoms period and went on to develop their styles independently after the main Hokuto Shinken school was relocated to Japan. They are named after the Cao, Sun and Liu families, which they were each sworn to protect and serve. The Liu Family Fist would later branch off from the other school and become the Hokuto Ryūken school from Fist of the North Star.

Máng Kuáng-Yún (芒 狂雲, Bō Kyōun) Voiced by: Kiyoyuki Yanada
Also known as Líng-Wáng (靈王, Reiō). A master of the Sun Family Fist (北斗孫家拳, Hokuto Sonkaken), he learn the forbidden art of "Pressure Point Displacement" (秘孔変位, Hikō Hen'i), which drives its users insane and shortens their lifespan. He was the one that took Pan Yu-Ling's memory because he fell in love with her, but also because he thinks this is a fitting punishment to Kenshiro. He got his wish to "fight someone worthy of taking my life" granted by the Old Taoist Fortune Teller. He was already dying from a slow decaying death from his self-inflicted pressure points by then. In contrast to Yan Wang's smelling instinct, he possesses great hearing instinct which allows him to hear conversations miles away.
Charles de Guise (シャルル・ド・ギーズ, Sharuru Do Gīzu) Voiced by: Taiten Kusunoki
A French Jew and colonel in the French army that works with the Qing-Bang. Although he knows the Sun Family Fist, he prefers using conventional fighting methods like guns and swords; however, if necessary, he uses Sonkaken combined with either his saber or pistol and only truly uses it when he fights seriously, otherwise, he'd usually surrender, summons his soldiers, or fight regularly using firearms or fencing. He has a sister, Sophie, who suffered trauma resulting in memory suppression due to her experiences in escaping from Nazi Germany as her husband (a non-Jewish German who was prohibited from marrying her by Nazi law) got sent to a concentration camp. When she regained her memory by Kenshiro's acupressure, she was assassinated by Zhang Tai Yan. De Guise was eventually wounded fatally by Liú Fēi-Yàn when the latter deemed him unfit to take care of Erika and challenged him to a duel. Kenshiro used acupressure techniques on him to prolong his life just long enough to watch his friends staging a glimpse of his vision- a Shanghai in prosperity (where Jews can take refuge). Believing that Kenshiro and friends will make it come true, he then died in peace.
Zhāng Tài-Yán (張 太炎, Chō Taien) Voiced by: Hōchū Ōtsuka
Successor to the Cao Family Fist (北斗曹家拳, Hokuto Sōkaken) and the Hóng Huá Huì's No.2 man. Although he appears laid back, he can be destructive when angered, his attacks are based on cutting and slicing with his hands. Has a monstrous libido and is known as the "Bride Thief" because of his habit of killing newlywed husbands and taking their wives. He assassinated Charles de Guise's little sister with a time bomb. His next target was Lǐ Xiù-Bǎo, because of her resemblance to Pan, but when Kenshiro revealed that Lǐ Xiù-Bǎo was Yu-Ling, it made him more determined to claim her, resulting in him fighting Kenshiro with all his strength. Due to a misunderstanding, he believed his stepfather Zhāng Dà-Yán killed his mother and yearns to kill him for it. Later on, after learning the truth, he repented all his past sins with de Guise agreeing not to seek revenge for the time being. He eventually became the new Master of the Cao Family Fist after a showdown fight with Zhāng Dà-Yán and earned his father's approval.
Zhāng Dà-Yán (章 大厳, Shō Daigen) Voiced by: Seizō Katō
Master of the Sōkaken style. Father of the Hong Hua Hui boss, Zhāng Liè-Shān. He later married Zhāng Tài-Yán's mother and had been led to believe Tài-Yán was his child when he was actually the son of her previous husband. Years later Dà-Yán was enraged to learn the truth and his wife killed herself on the condition Dà-Yán spare Zhāng Tài-Yán's life. Noticing the young Tài-Yán's talent, he adopted him and trained him in Sōkaken. Eventually Dà-Yán passed on the title of Sōkaken Master to Tài-Yán after Tài-Yán defeated him. However, Dà-Yán then died as a result of injuries from the fight.
Wǔchāmén-Dǎng (五叉門党, Goshamon-Tō)
An order of monks who serve Zhāng Tài-Yán. Each is known only by the number of stars they have tattooed on their heads. Their true purpose is to help Tài-Yán become a worthy successor of Hokuto Sōkaken; under the orders of Zhāng Dà-Yán. They were challenged by De Guise, who was intent on protecting Kenshiro, who was fighting Tai-Yan at the time; realizing what De Guise was trying to do, the group thanked him. All of them are armed with a Khakkhara, which they are able to pierce through any object, especially metal.
Liú Zōng-Wǔ (劉 宗武, Ryū Sōbu)
Successor to the Liu Family Fist (北斗劉家拳, Hokuto Ryūkaken). Driven to revenge by the death of his family, Zōng-Wǔ turned evil and joined the Nazis as a German army officer even though he is Chinese. He had the chance to kill Adolf Hitler, but didn't because he felt Hitler is too pitiful a prey for him to kill. He later renounces his evil ways and becomes a monk. He bears a strong resemblance Raoh, implying he may be a blood relative or a past life incarnation.
Xià Wén-Lì (夏 文麗, Ka Bunrei)
Liú Zōng-Wǔ's former lover. She had her nipples ripped off by him when she attempted to dissuade him from joining the Nazis. She then became a Buddhist nun, but in spite of what Zōng-Wǔ did she still loves him deeply—while she claimed to be wishing to see Zōng-Wǔ dead, she really meant that she wants to see him living out his destiny.
Jūkei (ジュウケイ)
An orphaned young boy whose sister was killed. He will eventually become the Hokuto Ryūken master from Fist of the North Star who would train Kaioh, Hyo, Han, and Shachi.
Liú Xuán-Xìn (劉 玄信, Ryū Genshin)
Zōng-Wǔ's predecessor as master of the Liu Family Fist.
Měi-Fú (美福, Mifuku)
Mistress of the Tài Shèng Yuàn (泰聖院, Taiseiden) Temple in Ningbo. She is actually Liú Xuán-Xìn's daughter Liú Yuè-Yīng (劉 月英, Ryū Getsuei) and is the mother of Kenshirō Kasumi.

=== Kyokujūji Seiken ===
"Pole Cross Sacred Fist" (極十字聖拳, Pinyin: Jíshízì Shèngquán), an offshoot of Hokuto Ryūkaken. A relatively new style compared to the Hokuto styles, its astrological symbol is the constellation of the Southern Cross and uses stabbing techniques that destroys the body externally.

Wèi Ruì-Yīng (魏 瑞鷹, Gi Zuiyō)
The grubby founder of Kyokujūji Seiken. Ruì-Yīng was at first the most promising student of Hokuto Ryūkaken of his generation, but left after he became disgruntled since he considered all other practitioners of Ryūkaken too weak by his standards. When he left he asked his Hokuto Ryūkaken master for the right to challenge Hokuto Shinken in order to become the strongest Hokuto Master, but was refused. He then fought his own master but was hit with a poisoned arrow in the leg during the process, which he then chopped off. Wèi Ruì-Yīng later fought Kasumi Tesshin, Kenshirō's father and 61st successor of Hokuto Shinken, to a draw.
Biāo Bái-Fèng (彪 白鳳, Hyō Hakuhō)
Wèi Ruì-Yīng's elder student. Prepared for death, he challenged Kenshiro, but was shot to death by the Nazis before their actual duel. A member of the Communist Party, he accepted a contract for Kasumi's live by the Nationalist Party in exchange for an enormous sum. He is the "Older Brother" of Liu Fei-Yan, being the first student. Dies protecting Liú Fēi-Yàn from a Nazi sniper.
Liú Fēi-Yàn (流 飛燕, Ryū Hien)
Wèi Ruì-Yīng's second student. Nicknamed the Death Bird Demon (死鳥鬼, Sǐ Niǎo Guǐ), he befriended Erika and risked his life to protect her. He challenged Charles de Guise to a duel because he thought de Guise cannot bear the responsibility of protecting Erika and ended up killing de Guise. This led to a fight with Kenshiro, and although he was defeated, Erika's influence on him earned him Kenshiro's forgiveness. He was mortally wounded at the hands of Yasaka. Fēi-Yàn, knowing that he was certain to die from his injuries and unwilling to add to Erika's grief by making her witness his death (although, despite Kenshiro and friends' best efforts to avoid mentioning his death, Erika is eventually able to figure it out), asked Kenshiro to send him to sea in a boat. There he recounted all the good things Erika did for him before drawing his last breath.

=== Seito Gekken ===
"West Dipper Lunar Fist" (西斗月拳, Pinyin: Xīdǒu Yuèquán). A martial art of the Yuezhi people. Shuken studied this martial art and blended it with his Hokuto Sōke no Ken (北斗宗家の拳, lit. "North Dipper Lineage's Fist") to create Hokuto Shinken. Seito Gekken uses the Keiraku Hikō, the same vital points used by Hokuto Shinken, to cause destruction, but does so through hitting multiple points through the course of a fight rather than hitting a single point.

Yasaka (ヤサカ)
A mysterious green-eyed warrior. A descendant of the Yuezhi who carries their nearly 2,000-year grudge against the Hokuto for Shuken's massacre of the practitioners of Seito Gekken. He works as a bodyguard for Dù Tiān-Fēng. He claims his name is ancient Hebrew for "to see God". He eventually gives up his vendetta after Kenshiro shows him the truth about the massacre, in which it is revealed that Shuken had been shown a future where the users of Seito Gekken would be reduced to mere mercenaries and assassins selling their skills to the highest bidder and causing untold pain and misery wherever they went, and leaves on good terms with his former rival. He appears in the second closing credits of the Sōten no Ken anime.
Yahma (ヤーマ, Yāma)
A female practitioner from 2,000 years ago that was the lover of Shuken. She was initially thought to have been killed by Shuken, but was later revealed to have committed suicide to spare her lover the pain of killing her. Her last act before death was to give birth to her and Shuken's child, who was then found and raised by a wolf who happened to find Yahma's corpse.

=== Tento Seiin Ken ===
"Heaven Dipper Sacred Yin Fist " (天斗聖陰拳) is the ancient martial art of the Nahash (serpent) tribe. The Nahash existed before Christ and defended Migdol and the Promised Land. It is a development of the Seito Gekken style from when the Nahash people from the west met the Yuezhi people from the east. Its proponents produce glowing fists which leave burn marks on their opponents. This style is used by Van der Kohl, Simeon Nagid, Himuka, and Shomer.

Simeon Nagid (シメオン・ナギット, Shimeon Nagitto)

Leader of the remnants of the Nahash people and hoping to fulfill the Nahash prophesy and recreate the world with Migadol's Thunderbolts.

Himuka (ヒムカ(ケンシン), Himuka(Kenshin))

Initially a supporter of Simeon Nagid whom he grew up with, but following Simeon's death, his intention is to recreate the world with Migadol's Thunderbolts for his own benefit. His original name is Kenshin and trained with Kenshiro as a youth under Tesshin.

== Gangs ==
=== Qīng Bāng ===
Qīng Bāng (青幇, Chinpan) is the Shanghai "Green Gang".

Pān Guāng-Lín (潘 光琳, Han Kōrin) Voiced by: Masaki Terasoma
Leader of the Qīng Bāng, also close friend of Kenshiro. While Kenshiro was away from Shanghai, his Triad gang members were killed one by one. He was tortured for a period of time by the Hong Hua, thus losing his feet from flesh eating rats. Kenshiro saved his life by amputating his already poisoned feet. He now walks with two prosthetic iron shoes.
Pān Yù-Líng (潘 玉玲, Han Gyokurei) Voiced by: Aya Hisakawa, Yumi Tōma (2018 anime)
Pān Guāng-Lín's sister and Kenshirō's girlfriend. She first met Kenshirō after he was badly beaten and she nursed him back to health. She also appears to be some sort of Christian. Her adopted father promised her to Máng Kuáng-Yún as payment. But Yù-Líng was already in love with Kenshiro, and a jealous Kuáng-Yún erased her memory and left her with a nomadic warlord in Northern China. She became the horse bandit leader Lǐ Xiù-Bǎo (李 秀寶, Ri Shūhō), fighting small guerrilla battles against the Imperial Japanese Army, gaining a sense of hatred against the Japanese. She also learned some Praying Mantis martial art. She eventually regains her memories in Shanghai after meeting Kenshiro again, and soon marries him. After Guāng-Lín was crippled in a failed assassination attempt, she succeeds her brother as leader of the Qīng Bāng.
Yáng Měi-Yù (楊 美玉, Yan Bigyoku) Voiced by: Sayaka Ohara
Pān Guāng-Lín's actress girlfriend.
Yè (葉, Yō) Voiced by: Kinryu Arimoto
Nicknamed "Two-Pistol Yè". He was horribly burned by the Hóng Huá Huì and disfigured.
Yè Zi-Yīng (葉 子英, Yō Shiei) Voiced by: Yūdai Satō
Son of Yè, a streetwise kid (around 12-14 year old) who also serves as a sidekick of Kenshiro.
Lǐ Yǒng-Jiàn (李 永健, Ri Eiken) Voiced by: Umeji Sasaki
Worked as an assassin for the secret society Qīng-Bāng and was called The Sleeping Dragon (睡龍, Shuì-Lóng). A good friend of Kenshirō Kasumi. At the beginning of the series, the old man works as a food taster for Emperor Pu-Yi and travels with him to Japan. He was captured by the Hóng-Huá Society and was interrogated as to the whereabouts of Yán-Wáng . Even when they cut off his toes, he refused to tell them anything. Dies from his illness by the end of the first story arc.

=== Hóng Huá Huì ===
Shanghai's evil "Red Flower Gang" (紅華会, Kōkakai). Most of them were maimed in some way by Kenshiro during a previous visit to Shanghai prior to the start of the series. Based on the real life Red Gang (紅幫 Hóng Bāng) in Shanghai.

Zhāng Liè-Shān (章 烈山, Shō Retsuzan)
The gigantic leader of the Hóng Huá Society. He is the son of the Hokuto Sōkaken master, Zhāng Dà-Yán, and Zhāng Tài-Yán's older step-brother. Formerly served in the Beiyang Army, he joins the National Revolutionary Army following the collapse of the Beiyang government, eventually becoming a general (this character reflects real historical support the Kuomintang received from various Triad gangs), but also works in secret with Chinese communist groups as well to his own benefit. His father did not train him in Hokuto Sōkaken, something he is very resentful for, but due to his giant stature and overwhelming physical strength he is still deadly wielding a pair of matching giant sai. He later repented his actions after learning the truth behind his father not training him (that Zhāng Dà-Yán could never bring himself to engage his own son in the fight to decide on the new Master of Hokuto Sōkaken, a fight that can very well turn deadly).
Huáng Xī-Fēi (黄 西飛, Kō Seihi) Voiced by: Yōsuke Akimoto
The Number Three Boss after Zhāng Liè-Shān & Zhāng Tài-Yán. Due to injuries he suffered at the fists of Kasumi Kenshiro, he must wear a metal contraption on the left side of his head and body. Whenever he moves he always shouts, "A-I-TA!" in pain. He's a big contributor to a corrupt Catholic Church that will forgive any sins he confesses for the right price.
Wú Dōng-Lái (吳 東來, Go Tōrai) Voiced by: Chafurin
The Number Four Boss comes from the province of Canton. Due to injuries he suffered at the fists of Yán Wáng, he uses a wheelchair and wears a metal contraption with a crank to raise and lower his head. Jumpy and trigger-happy, he'll shoot anything that bothers him. A slovenly womanizer, Wu desired Pān Guāng-Lín's actress girlfriend Yáng Měi-Yù. The insanely jealous Wu held Pan in his dungeon, intending to use him as the "tiger-meat" in his "Dragon–Tiger Stew". Wu never got the chance, because Yan-Wang knocked Wu into his own boiling cauldron, killing him.
Chén Jùan-Mín (陳 狷民, Chin Kenmin) Voiced by: Issei Futamata
Nicknamed "Weasel" Chén, he has a metal hand. His face was scarred by Yan-Wang after his failed attempt to kidnap Takeshi Kitaoji.
Píng Yīng-Zhèng (憑英正, Hyō Eisei) Voiced by: Katsuhisa Houki
Has a metal jaw. Shot to death by Yè.
Mù Dà-Hóng (沐 大洪, Moku Daikō) Voiced by: Masuo Amada
Wears dark glasses and has a metal plate on his head. Has a metal claw in place of one hand. Shot to death by Yè.
Tián Xué-Fāng (田 學芳, Den Gakuhō) Voiced by: Minoru Inaba
Once nicknamed Shuǐ Hǔ Tian for the bald patch atop his head, he now wears a heavy iron toupee that is bolted to his head, of which he is in denial that it is obvious to anyone that it's a toupee; the weight of it also causes him to easily fall over. Has metal hands. Died from drowning in a bath house after Kenshiro disabled his arms and legs.
Gaurin (ゴラン, Goran) Voiced by: Yoshinori Sonobe
A boxer who serves as the champion of the Execution Games held at the Great New World Entertainment Hall. He was responsible for the deaths of countless Qīng Bāng members that were captured by the Hóng Huá Huì and thrown into the ring. While serving in the French Indochina Army, he learned Muay Thai in Siam. He is destroyed by Kenshiro Kasumi's rendition of the Hokuto Hyakuretsuken which ends with him striking Tōmonketsu Hashisō pressure point, which causes all of Goran's bones to break within his body, turning him into mush.
Jean Carné (ジャン・カルネ, Jan Karune) Voiced by: Masaru Ikeda
The chief of police at the Shanghai French Concession. An ally of the Hóng Huá Huì, he got his position by murdering his predecessor Gitanesdeau, a supporter of the Qīng Bāng. After Pān Guāng-Lín is saved by Kenshiro, he attempts to flee to South America, but is shot to death by Guāng-Lín.

== Other characters ==
=== Japanese ===
Takeshi Kitaōji (北大路 剛士, Kitaōji Takeshi) Voiced by: Katsuhiko Sasaki
Head of the Kitaōji Zaibatsu and founder of Tōwa Women's University. He and his daughter Aya were saved by Kenshirō in Shanghai from Chen the Weasel and soon became friends with him, giving him a job as a lecturer in at Tōwa University. A collaborator in the Fugu Plan.
Aya Kitaōji (北大路 綾, Kitaōji Aya) Voiced by: Aya Hisakawa
The daughter of Takeshi Kitaōji. A student attending Professor Kasumi's class at the Tōwa Women's University. In the TV series, Kenshirō notices her resemblance to Pan Yu-Ling.
Tokusaburō Kumazasa (熊笹 徳三郎, Kumazasa Tokusaburō) Voiced by: Nobuyuki Furuta
Head of the Shanghai branch of the Kitaōji Zaibatsu.
Hōsaku Ōkawa (大川 奉作, Ōkawa Hōsaku) Voiced by: Nobuaki Kakuda
Lieutenant General of the Kwantung Army Headquarters. His son was killed by the horse bandit Yǔ Zhàn-Hǎi.
Kūkai (空海)
9th century monk of that was instrumental in bringing Hokuto Shinken from China to Japan.
Oda Nobunaga (織田信長)

=== Chinese ===
Aisin-Gioro Puyi (愛新覺羅溥儀, Aishinkakura Fugi) Voiced by: Hiroshi Yanaka
Former emperor of China, then emperor of Manchukuo. Purely a puppet of the Japanese Empire, the neurotic Puyi becomes terrified of being assassinated by the Chinese Nationalist Party. On April 6, 1935, Puyi came to Japan under the cover of a "Japan-Manchuria Friendship Envoy" to employ the legendary Hokuto Shinken successor Yan-Wang as his bodyguard. Kenshiro assaults him after his men, though Puyi was going to kill him; the attack opens his eyes to the fact that he is nothing but a puppet, though he attempts to fight Ken with a sword because he wished to die a man. After Ken spares his life, he admits he wishes he could have been friends with someone like him and seems to come out stronger.
Jīn Kè-Róng (金 克榮, Kin Katsuei) Voiced by: Ryūzaburō Ōtomo
The Captain of the first regiment of Puyi's Manchukuo Imperial Guards, and is known as the "Fist Hero of Hebei". He is a master of Bajiquan, and fights with a metal fan. Years ago, when was working as a bodyguard in Shanghai he was scarred in a fight with Yán Wáng, which resulted in a draw; but felt cheated by Yán Wáng because he refused to use Hokuto Shinken against him (though Ken would later reveal that he only did this because at the time of their first fight, he was not the successor to Hokuto Shinken and that by Hokuto law, only Hokuto Shinken's master could use it in a fight against other martial arts schools). He kidnaps Kenshiro's friend Li and pretends to kill him, in order to drawn out Ken and have a rematch, only to immediately realize that he is no match for Kenshiro and is spared.
"The Taoist" (道士, Dōshi) Voiced by: Masaru Ikeda
A mystical old fortune teller, who appears time to time out of nowhere to talk to (or sometimes taunt) Kenshiro. Other people may or may not notice his appearance or existence, as he seems to possess some kind of mysterious ability to make bystanders forget about him. He gave a "fate medallion" to Kenshiro as a flip coin to help him make a decision when facing a serious dilemma. He also grants worthy people connected to the Hokuto clan a wish about their fate. His identity and agenda have yet to be revealed.
Mounted Bandits (馬賊, Bazoku)
A group of lawless non-Han Chinese bandits roaming in the countryside, elements of whom hired by Zhāng Liè-Shān to cause chaos in Shanghai and reinforce the Hong Hua Triads. They adopted Yu-Ling when her memory was erased.
Dù Tiān-Fēng (杜 天風, To Tenbū)
The big boss of a secret organization called the Tài Hú Bāng (太湖幇, Taikopan, "Lake Tai Gang"). He murdered Zōng-Wǔ's father, Liú Zōng-Jiàn, in order to launder money from him when Zōng-Wǔ was still a child. Yasaka is in his employ. He created an electrified "Pressure Point Defense Suit" that would electrocute anyone that tried to touch him; an attempt at protecting himself from the Hokuto arts. Liú Zōng-Wǔ was able to safely kick him using his rubber-soled boots, shorting out the circuits on his suits and then sending him into the ocean where Dù ended up electrocuting himself to death.
Huì-Guǒ (惠果, Keika)
Kūkai's Buddhist master.
Chiang Kai-shek (蒋介石, Shō Kōseki)
Generalissmo of Kuomintang and President of the Republic of China during World War 2. When Kenshiro kills Luó Hŭ-Chéng, who not only is a treacherous underling of Zhāng Liè-Shān but also happens to be a general in the National Revolutionary Army, Chiang overrules a suggestion to deploy the military against Kenshiro in retaliation, considering the motives behind the latter's actions noble enough to deserve better than execution or covert assassination. Nevertheless agreeing that the Nationalist government can ill-afford a show of weakness, he instead issued an order to find the best Chinese fighter to defeat Kenshiro in a bid to uphold the Chinese honor.

=== Other foreigners ===
Edmond Heckler (エドモンド・ヘックラー, Edomondo Hekkurā)
A Colonel in the German Wehrmacht, he works as a military advisor for the Nazi Party and has a side job as an arms dealer. He uses Zōng-Wǔ to prolong the war so he can continue to profit from it. After Zōng-Wǔ kills one of Dù Tiān-Fēng's informant, he tries to kill Zōng-Wǔ at Dù's request, but fails and is killed by Zōng-Wǔ.
Erika Arendt (エリカ・アレント, Erika Arento)
A Jewish girl with a photographic memory, Erika has a catalogue of hidden valuable artwork called "The List of Hope" memorized. Nazis pursue her to get this information, and she comes under the protection of Liú Fēi-Yàn to guide her to the Shanghai Ghetto.
