= Kazuyo Katsuma =

Japanese businesswoman and author

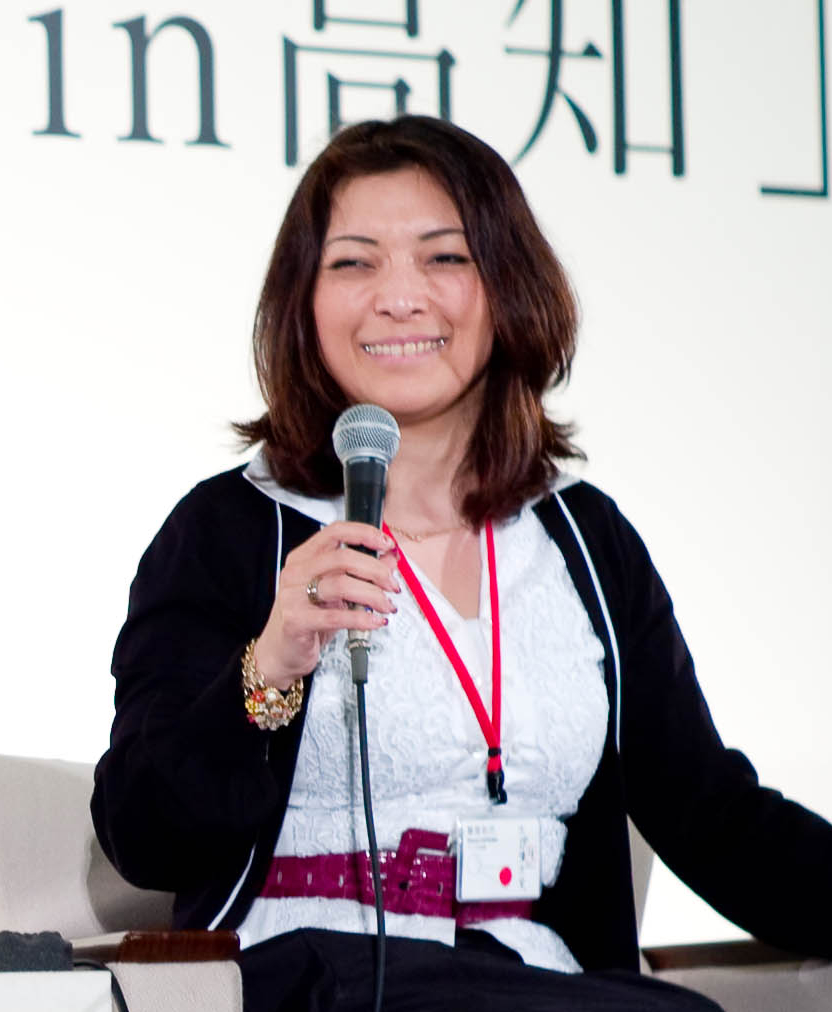
- Kazuyo Katsuma (in Kōchi Prefecture on November 29, 2009).

YouTube information
- Channel: 勝間和代が徹底的にマニアックな話をするYouTube
- Years active: 2013-present
- Genre: entertainment
- Subscribers: 250 thousand
- Views: 125.2 million
- Last updated: March 31, 2025

Kazuyo Katsuma (勝間 和代, Katsuma Kazuyo; born December 14, 1968) is a Japanese businesswoman and author of several best selling books, with sales numbers in the tens of millions. She writes mostly about self management, work–life balance, gender equality and how women can become more successful. She concentrates especially on optimizing thought processes and increasing productivity.

== Biography ==
She graduated from Keio University School of Commerce and the Waseda University Graduate School with a master's degree in finance. Later she worked as analyst for several international consulting companies and banks like McKinsey and JPMorgan Chase.

Katsuma was nominated as one of "The 50 Women to Watch 2005" by The Wall Street Journal. She was placed in the "Advocates" section, which means that she works to improve the lives of other women.

In Katsuma's sophomore year at Keio University in Tokyo, she had passed her second stage CPA exam and obtained a position at one of the leading accounting firms in Japan. When she was 21 years old, she got a CPA position at a Japanese branch of the accounting firm Arthur and Andersen & Co., this accomplishment was achieved in the same year she gave birth to her first child. In 1994, after giving birth to her second child, Katsuma decided to take her finance career in another direction: She decided to become a securities trader and researcher for Chase Bank.

Katsuma found a niche in the analytical side of the financial industry. She had shifted from company to company during her career—like so many do in her field—and found a home for a few years at the consulting group McKinsey & Company. While at McKinsey, Katsuma gave birth to her third child. In 2003, Katsuma had changed companies again, this time she had decided to work at J.P. Morgan as an analyst. It was between her work at J.P. Morgan and the founding her website forum for a working mothers titled "Field of Mugi" that grabbed the Wall Street Journal's attention; they subsequently added Katsuma to their list for the "Top 50 women to watch".

In 2018, Katsuma declared that she was in a relationship with and living with another woman, LGBT rights activist Hiroko Masuhara.
