= GirlsAward =

Fashion and music event in Tokyo, Japan

- Genre: Clothing and fashion exhibitions
- Frequency: Semi-annually
- Locations: Tokyo, Japan
- Inaugurated: 2010
- Founder: GirlsAward executive committee
- Attendance: 25,000 (2023 A/W)
- Sponsors: Rakuten
- Website: girls-award.com

GirlsAward (ガールズアワード), sometimes abbreviated as GA, is a semi-annual fashion and music event held at Yoyogi National Gymnasium 1st Gymnasium in Tokyo, Japan. It is one of the biggest fashion events in Japan, with approximately 20,000 people attending each time. It is organized by Award Inc. under the slogan "Shibuya to Asia, and the World". From GirlsAward 2017 Autumn/Winter(A/W), Rakuten became the main sponsor. Usually, the Autumn/Winter(A/W) event is held in September to October, and the Spring/Summer(S/S) is held in March to May of each year.

== History ==
On September 9, 2009, the first event GirlsAward 2009 was held at Shibuya O-East. It featured models, gravure idols, and auditions associated with DAM Karaoke system. In 2010, from GirlsAward 2010, the location was moved to Yoyogi National Gymnasium. From January 25 to 27, 2012, a collaboration event was held with South Korean television MBC featuring the fashion show and K-pop music. In 2014, the first overseas event with A-Nation was held in Taiwan. On April 9, 2016, during GirlsAward 2016 S/S, Instagram's CEO Kevin Systrom appeared on the stage and made a selfie performance with Haruna Kojima, a member of AKB48. On September 16, 2017, the venue was changed to Makuhari Messe in Chiba Prefecture for GirlsAward 2017 A/W. In front of 31,000 visitors, Alice Hirose and Suzu Hirose were the first sister performers to appear first on the catwalk. At this event, South Korea's Taemin, a member of Korea's Shinee, made his first solo appearance as a secret guest. At the 2024 Girls Awards A/W, actress Ryoko Yonekura appeared catwalk as a secret guest for the first time in 11 years, and South Korea's Plave was the first virtual boy band to perform.

== Past venues ==
No.	Event	Date	Ref.
-	GirlsAward 2009 (Note: Held at Shibuya O-East. MC is Dangerous and special guest is Chinatsu Wakatsuki. Participated models are Kana Tsugihara, Ai, China Fukunaga, Maya Koizumi, Akina Aoshima, Natsumi Kuroki, Riena, Rina Nagasaki, Izumi Nakadai, Mana Honda and Yumi Higashino. Special live artists are SoulJa, Beni, DJ MAYUMI×Maki Goto and miray.)	September 9, 2009	
1	GirlsAward 2010 Spring/Summer	May 22, 2010	
2	GirlsAward 2010 Autumn/Winter	September 18, 2010	
3	GirlsAward by CROOZ blog 2011 Spring/Summer	April 29, 2011	
4	GirlsAward by CROOZ blog 2011 Autumn/Winter	November 12, 2011	
-	Kiss supported by GirlsAward (Note: Participated models are Lena Fujii, Ai Tominaga, Yukina Kinoshita, Akina Minami, Reina Triendl, Angelica Michibata, 김태연, 김현진, 박슬기, 박지혜 and 최은정. Participated artists are Girls' Generation, Kara, Beast, CNBLUE, After School, T-ara, 4Minute, Infinite and Secret.)	January 25–27, 2012	
5	GirlsAward 2012 Spring/Summer	May 26, 2012	
-	A-Nation music week collection supported by GirlsAward (Note: MC is Ryōko Kawase. Models: Kozue Akimoto, Alisa Urahama, Emi Renata, Mitsuki Oishi, Mizuki Ōtomo, CAROLINA, Mayuko Kawakita, Ranko Kanbe, Kelly, Miki Kokubo, Shiori Sato, Satoumi, Saki Sugawara, Chinami Suzuki, Sonii, Sonmi, Maryjun Takahashi, Nana(AFTERSCHOOL), Nanaka, Yuka Nanjyō, Nicole, Monaka Nishi, Alisa Nishida, Lena Fujii, Aki Hoshino, Yuka Mizuhara, Angelica Michibata, Akina Minami, Shiho Mukōyama, Yōko Melody, Youn-A, Leena, Liv, Chikako Watanabe Brands: GUILD PRIME, LOVELESS, Bershka and Forever 21)	August 4–6, 2012 and August 8, 2012	
6	GirlsAward 2012 Autumn/Winter	November 8, 2012	
7	GirlsAward 2013 Spring/Summer	March 23, 2013	
-	A-Nation&GirlsAward island collection (Note: Models: AMO, Arime, emma, IMARU, Kelly, riena, Saori, Una, YiRAN, Alice, Emi Renata, CAROLINA, Kelly Ann, Nicol, Noma, Youn-a, Nina Itō, Nana Utsuno, Alisa Urahama, Mei Nagano, Chinatsu Endō, Serika Okuwaki, Sayaka Okada, Azusa Okamoto, Natsumi Okamoto, Seira Kagami, Reina Kagami, Rena Kagami, Natsuki Katō, Emiri Miyasaka, Rika Mamiya, Cecil Kishimoto, Sayo Yoshida, Satoko Miyata, Zaira Miyajima, Chihiro Kondō, Rinka Kumada, Louis Kurihara, Moe Arai, Fūka Takashima, Eimi Kuroda, Sayaka Imai, Arisa Sato, Shiori Sato, Yukiko Sano, Hiromi Hosoi, Nanao, Saika, Azusa Mine, Yu Yamada, Yuumi Shida, Saeko, Sayaka Akimoto, Kozue Akimoto, Kumiko Funayama, Karin Osanai, Minato Kobori, Nanaka Ozawa, Hana Matsushima, Aki Matsumoto, Ai Matsumoto, Mao Ueda, Mizuki Nishikawa, Erika Ishitobi, Siruku Kawaguchi, Nozomi Maeda, Mari Murata, Michi Ōmori, Aya Ōmasa, Eri Ōishi, Reimi Ōsawa, Risako Tanigawam, Mitsu Dan, Seika Taketomi, Kana Nakagawa, Anri Nakajima, Hikari Shiina, Wakaba Tanaka, Miho Tanaka, Natsuko Tōgo, Nicole Fujita, Maria Fuji, Ema Fujisawa, Angelica Michibata, Sachie Futamura, Marie Iitoyo, Yū Hirukawa, Miyū, Risa Hirako, Yumika Hirao, Suzuka Hori, Saki Asamiya, Juliana Minato, Mikiko Yano, Kyōko Ochiai, Satoumi, Sakura Hayashi, Chinami Suzuki, Miu Suzuki, Mai Hirose. Artists: Hitomi, Da-ice, Vimclip, SoulJa×KenJi03×Mayuko Kawakita)	August 3–11, 2013	
8	GirlsAward 2013 Autumn/Winter	September 28, 2013	
9	GirlsAward 2014 Spring/Summer	April 19, 2014	
-	A-Nation&GirlsAward island collection (Note: Models: AMO, IMALU, Elli Rose, CAROLINA, Shaula, Trauden Naomi, Noma, Mai, Yōko Melody, Mei Nagano, Sayaka Okada, Natsumi Okamoto, Seira Kagami, Rinka Kumada, Koharu Kusumi, Ikumi Hisamatsu, Satoko Miyata, Aya Kondō, Yoshiaki Takahashi, Fūka Takashima, Eimi Kuroda, Monica Sahara, Shiori Sato, Kentaro Sakaguchi, Rikako Sakata, Ryōhei Yamashita, Tomoya Yamaguchi(SOLIDEMO), Mizuki Yamamoto, Ayano Wakayama, Karin Osanai, Nana Komatsu, Ryota Kobayashi, Mao Ueda, Erika Oda, Yuko Araki, Ryo Narita, Rinka Shimizu, Nicole Ishida, Haru Izumi, Kana Oya, Rinka Ōtani, Elaiza Ikeda, Seika Taketomi, Riho Nakamura, Riisa Naka, Mirei Tanaka(Super Girls), Hazuki Tsuchiya, Yumi Higashino, Sachie Futamura, Yui Tomikawa, Aiku Maikawa, Akane Hotta, Saki Asamiya, Juliana Minato, Tomoko Nozaki, Miu Suzuki, Yūna Suzuki, Shione Sawada. Live: chay, Kemio&Amigachu, MACO, 9nine, Hime Carat, Hitomi. Guest: Hiroyuki Amano, Ruriko Kojima, Akira Shinomiya(Ozin Osbourne))	August 14–20, 2014	
-	A-Nation&GirlsAward island collection in Taiwan	September 13, 2014	
-	A-Nation&GirlsAward island collection in Singapore	October 18, 2014	
10	GirlsAward 2014 Autumn/Winter	October 1, 2014	
11	GirlsAward 2015 Spring/Summer	April 29, 2015	
12	GirlsAward 2015 Autumn/Winter	October 24, 2015	
13	GirlsAward 2016 Spring/Summer	April 9, 2016	
14	GirlsAward 2016 Autumn/Winter	October 8, 2016	
15	GirlsAward 2017 Spring/Summer	May 3, 2017	
16	Rakuten GirlsAward 2017 Autumn/Winter	September 16, 2017	
17	Rakuten GirlsAward 2018 Spring/Summer	May 19, 2018	
18	Rakuten GirlsAward 2018 Autumn/Winter	September 16, 2018	
19	Rakuten GirlsAward 2019 Spring/Summer	May 18, 2019	
20	Rakuten GirlsAward 2019 Autumn/Winter	September 28, 2019	
-	Tokyo Virtual Runway Live by GirlsAward vol.1	June 27, 2020	
21	Rakuten GirlsAward 2022 Spring/Summer	May 14, 2022	
22	Rakuten GirlsAward 2022 Autumn/Winter	October 8, 2022	
23	Rakuten GirlsAward 2023 Spring/Summer	May 4, 2023	
24	Rakuten GirlsAward 2023 Autumn/Winter	September 30, 2023	
25	Rakuten GirlsAward 2024 Spring/Summer	May 3, 2024	
26	Rakuten GirlsAward 2024 Autumn/Winter	October 19, 2024	
