= GirlsAward 2015 Spring/Summer =

Fashion event held in Japan

- Genre: Clothing and fashion exhibitions
- Date: April 29, 2015
- Locations: Tokyo, Japan
- Inaugurated: 2010
- Founder: GirlsAward executive committee
- Previous event: 2014 A/W
- Next event: 2015 A/W
- Attendance: 34,000
- Sponsors: Ministry of Foreign Affairs, Tokyo Metropolitan Government; Fuji Television
- Website: 2015ss.girls-award.com/pc/

GirlsAward 2015 Spring/Summer (ガールズアワード 2015 Spring/Summer) is a fashion and music event held on April 29, 2015, at Yoyogi National Gymnasium 1st Gymnasium in Tokyo, Japan. The main MCs were Ryōta Yamasato and Naomi Watanabe. In this event, Funassyi, the mascot character of Funabashi city, appeared again.

== Models ==
- Mayuko Arisue, Alexa, Marie Iitoyo, Nicole Ishida, Hana Imai, Imalu, Arisa Urahama, Manami Enosawa, emma, Elli-Rose, Oh HaYoung (Apink), Mitsuki Oishi, Keimi Ōsawa, Nanaka Ozawa(X21), Nonoka Ono, Miwako Kakei, Natsuki Katō, Carolina, Mayuko Kawakita, Reina Kizu, Kim Nam-joo (Apink), Asuka Saitō (Nogizaka46), Yui Sakuma, Arisa Sato, Satoumi, Yuumi Shida, Mai Shiraishi(Nogizaka46), Yua Shinkawa, Mayu Sugieda, Son Na-eun(Apink), Tina Tamashiro, Akemi Darenogare, Hazuki Tsuchiya, Reina Triendl, Mariya Nagao (AKB48), An Nakamura, Nana (After School), Nanao, Mizuki Nishikawa, Nanase Nishino (Nogizaka46), Park Cho-rong (Apink), Nanami Hashimoto (Nogizaka46), Lena Fujii, Akane Hotta, Maggy, Airi Matsui, Sayuri Matsumura (Nogizaka46), Arie Mizusawa, Yuka Mizuhara, Mai Miyagi, Ayaka Miyoshi, Yōko Melody, Alissa Yagi, Hirona Yamazaki, Yu Yamada, Mizuki Yamamoto, Yūki Yamamoto, Youn-a, Yoon Bo-mi (Apink), Loveli
- Non-no models: Aya Ōmasa, Mao Ueda, Azusa Okamoto, Yūna Suzuki, Sachie Futamura, Miki Satō, Yuko Araki, Sayaka Okada, Hinako Kinoshita, Akiko Kuji, Riho Takada, Niina Endō, Seika Taketomi, Haru Izumi, Yūka Suzuki, Nanase Nishino (Nogizaka46), Anri Okamoto, Fumika Baba, Mina Sayado, Tsubasa Honda
- Men's Non-no models: Shūntarō Yanagi, Kentaro Sakaguchi, Tomoya Yamaguchi, Yoshiaki Takahashi, Fumiya Komatsu, Taichi Kodama, Kōji Moriya, Gōta Yonekura, Ryōhei Yamashita, Shō Kiyohara, Yūji Matsumoto, Ryo Narita, Naoto Yamamoto, Ryosuke Yamamoto, Keisuke Nakata
- Men's models: Shintarō Akutsu, Ryōsuke Ikeoka, Yōichirō Ōmi, Takuya Negishi, Shūto Miyazaki, Naoya Nireki, Masaki Nakao

== Artists ==
- AAA, AKB48, Apink, Da-ice, Doberman Infinity, Lagoon, Nogizaka46, Tomomi Itano, Sakurako Ohara, Chubbiness, PKCZ

== Guests ==
- Satomi Ishihara, Ivan, Alexander, Nozomi Kawasaki, Masaya Nakamura, Ai Haruna, Funassyi, Yusuke Yamamoto, Tori Matsuzaka, Miori Takimoto

== Brands ==
- Adidas, Another Edition, Azul by Moussy, Banana Chips, Beams, Bershka, Blondy Relish, Bobon21, Coco Deal, Dazzlin, Evris, Flove, Forever 21, Guild Prime, Heather, Ingni, Jill by Jill Stuart, Kastane, Loco Boutique, Loveless, Lowry's Farm, Mercuryduo, Miia, Moussy, Murua, Old Navy, Outdoor, Resexxy, Royal Party, Sly, Spinns, Supreme.La.La, Titty&Co., Uniqlo, Wego
