= GirlsAward 2014 Autumn/Winter =

Fashion and music event in Japan

- Genre: Clothing and fashion exhibitions
- Date: October 1, 2014
- Locations: Tokyo, Japan
- Inaugurated: 2010
- Founder: GirlsAward executive committee
- Previous event: 2014 S/S
- Next event: 2015 S/S
- Attendance: 34,000
- Sponsors: Ministry of Foreign Affairs, Tokyo Metropolitan Government; Fuji Television
- Website: 2014aw.girls-award.com/pc/

GirlsAward 2014 Autumn/Winter (ガールズアワード, 2014 Autumn/Winter) is a fashion and music event held on October 1, 2014, at Yoyogi National Gymnasium 1st Gymnasium in Tokyo, Japan. It was 10th anniversary event and held under the theme of "LOVE ME 10DER. LOVE ME TENDER." The main MC is Japanese comedian duo Oriental Radio.

== Models ==
These models were present:

- Aina
- Sayaka Akimoto (former AKB48)
- Saki Amamiya
- AMO
- Yuko Araki
- Mayuko Arisue
- Marie Iitoyo
- Nicole Ishida
- Haru Izumi
- Nina Itō
- Hana Imai
- IMALU
- Mao Ueda
- Arisa Urahama
- Amy
- Manami Enosawa
- emma
- Elli-Rose
- Niina Endō
- Mitsuki Oishi
- Ayaka Audrey
- Ito Ōno
- Sayaka Okada
- Azusa Okamoto
- Anri Okamoto
- Nanaka Ozawa
- Erika Oda
- Nonoka Ono
- Kaeun (After School)
- Miwako Kakei
- Narumi Kajimoto
- Natsuki Katō
- CAROLINA
- Mayuko Kawakita
- Cecil Kishimoto
- Shiori Kitayama
- Reina Kizu
- Yukina Kinoshita
- Akiko Kuji
- Kana Kurashina
- Kelly Ann
- Yuui Kodama
- Nana Komatsu
- Chihiro Kondō
- Yui Sakuma
- Nozomi Sasaki
- Arisa Sato
- Satoumi
- Miki Satō
- Yuki Shikanuma
- Mai Shiraishi (Nogizaka46)
- Yua Shinkawa
- Yūka Suzuki
- Yūna Suzuki
- Haruna Sekiguchi
- Sonmi
- Shū Takada
- Riho Takada
- Haruna Takahashi
- Maryjun Takahashi
- Karen Takizawa
- Eri Tachibana
- Tina Tamashiro
- Akemi Darenogare
- Tsubasa Toshimizu
- Reina Triendl
- Mariya Nagao (AKB48)
- Kurumi Nakada
- An Nakamura
- Risa Nakamura
- Nana (Afterschool)
- Nanase Nishino (Nogizaka46)
- Tomoko Nozaki
- Moeka Nozaki
- Nanami Hashimoto (Nogizaka46)
- Yumi Higashino
- Suzu Hirose
- Sachi Fujii
- Lena Fujii
- Miki Fujimoto
- Seika Furuhata
- Akane Hotta
- Maggy
- Airi Matsui
- Rena Matsui (SKE48 and Nogizaka46)
- Sayuri Matsumura (Nogizaka46)
- Kiyo Matsumoto
- Nozomi Matsumoto
- Marie
- Arie Mizusawa
- Yuka Mizuhara
- Kaoru Mitsumune
- Akina Minami
- Mai Miyagi
- Satoko Miyata
- Miyu
- Ayaka Miyoshi
- Yōko Melody
- Alissa Yagi
- Hirona Yamazaki
- Yūki Yamamoto
- Maomi Yuki
- Hinano Yoshikawa
- Natsumi Yoshida
- Youn-a
- Loveli
- Mai Watanabe

== Artists ==
These artists performed:

- Alexandra Stan
- Nogizaka46
- May J.
- Mariya Nishiuchi
- DOBERMAN INFINITY
- Da-ice
- Kemio & Amigachu
- NU'EST
- YU-A

== Brands ==
These brands were present:

- Another Edition
- Avan Lily
- BANANA CHIPS
- BEAMS
- Bershka
- CLEOPATRA fig
- COCO DEAL
- Dickies
- FOREVER 21
- GUILD PRIME
- Heather
- JEANASIS
- JILL by JILLSTUART
- Kastane
- KIMONO PRINCESS
- Lily Brown
- LOVELESS
- LOWRYS FARM
- MIIA
- MOUSSY
- OZOC
- RESEXXY
- ROSE BUD
- ROYAL PARTY
- SLY
- SPINNS
- SPIRALGIRL
- titty&Co.
- WEGO
