= Miu-clips =

miu-clips
- Origin: Tokyo, Japan
- Genres: jazz, dance, pop
- Years active: 2006–present
- Labels: Nippon Columbia, Vithmic, Mousteche
- Members: Yoshifumi Ato
- Website: miu-clips Official website

miu-clips is a musical project created in 2006 by Yoshifumi Ato. Their debut album, Rhythm of My Heart, was released in 2009.

The project's frontman, composer, guitarist, keyboardist and record producer is Yoshifumi Ato.

== Discography ==
=== Studio albums ===
- Rhythm of My Heart - April 1, 2009

=== Other albums ===
- LOVE IT - November 4, 2009
- L.O.V.E. - November 17, 2010

=== Compilation albums ===
- Playlist ONE - October 7, 2009

=== EPs ===
- L.O.V.E. - EP - April 15, 2010

== Production discography ==
The following is a list of songs produced, co-produced and remixed by miu-clips.

=== Productions ===
- autumn leave's - turn to me - Definite Collections -(Album) - March 28, 2009
- V.A. - Funny Walk In Old Fashion / Lupin The Third DANCE&DRIVE official covers&remixes(Album) - August 26, 2009
- Lena Fujii - Pon de Replay / Rainbow(EP) - November 4, 2009
- Harumi Tsuyuzaki - Love Flame / Now Playing(Album) - April 20, 2011
- Harumi Tsuyuzaki - You Lied / Now Playing(Album) - April 20, 2011
- Fox Capture Plan - FLEXIBLE(Album) - October 10, 2012
- Sweets Girls Project - Sweets Girls –Twinkle Day-(Album) - March 13, 2013
- Sweets Girls Project - Sweets Girls –Eternal Love-(Album) - January 15, 2014
- Skoop On Somebody - Beautiful Sound(EP) - April 8, 2015

=== Remixes ===
- Jilty Soul - La Festa(Miu-Clips Remix) / Play Loud(Album) - November 12, 2008
- COLDFEET - It’s All About You (autumn leave’s remix album ver.) /TEN remixes(Album) - August 5, 2009
- COLDFEET - Rain Come Down (miu-clips remix) /TEN remixes(Album) - August 5, 2009
- Lena Fujii - Black Cinderella (miu-clips Remix) / Rainbow(EP) - November 4, 2009
- BLU-SWING - Feelin' Blue (miu-clips remix) / Feelin' Blue(EP) - December 8, 2010
- JABBERLOOP feat. Yoshika (from SOULHEAD) - Dear Santa (miu-clips remix) / Dear Santav(EP) - December 8, 2010
- M-Swift - Key of Love (miu-clips Remix) / Key of Love(EP) - March 2, 2011
- Gordon Chambers - Lead Me (miu-clips Remix) / Sincere Dance Edition(Album) - June 6, 2012

=== Compilation albums ===
- Flavor Bossa Case IV - December 20, 2006
- Flavor Bossa Case White Style - April 17, 2007
- Flavor Groove Case Summer Style - August 8, 2007
- Flavor Jazzy Soul Style - October 1, 2008
