= Chinami =

- Gender: Female

Origin
- Origin: Japanese
- Meaning: Different meanings depending on the kanji used

Chinami (written: 千波, 千奈美, 智奈美, 知那美 or ちなみ in hiragana) is a feminine Japanese given name. Notable people with the name include:

- Chinami Hashimoto (橋本 ちなみ; born 1992), Japanese voice actress
- Chinami Nishimura (voice actress) (西村 ちなみ; born 1970), Japanese voice actress
- Chinami Nishimura (politician) (西村 智奈美; born 1967), Japanese politician
- Chinami Suzuki (鈴木 ちなみ; born 1989), Japanese model
- Chinami Tokunaga (徳永 千奈美; born 1992), Japanese singer and idol
- Chinami Yoshida (吉田 知那美; born 1991), Japanese curler

== Fictional character ==
- Chinami Oka (岡 千波), a character in the light novel series Golden Time
