= History of makeup in Japan =

The documented history of make-up in Japan begins in the Edo period. While modern western makeup styles such as in Europe and the US emphasize pinpoint makeup for the eyes and mouth, modern Japanese styles place more emphasis on foundation, base makeup, and skin-care.

== History ==
=== The Edo Period (1603–1868): feudal society ===
The Edo period is defined as the period from 1603, when the Tokugawa family positioned itself at the center of politics, to 1878, when Yoshinobu Tokugawa returned the power to the emperor. In this period, the samurai rose their status, and the standard of living improved significantly. While the authority refused to have relationships with other countries, Japan created its own unique culture in this period. Japan experienced feudal society in the process of its development, which is called feudalism (幕藩体制). There was a relationship of master and servant between the people and the Tokugawa family. Tokugawa family was in control of all military, administrative, and judicial which were necessary to run the country.

Makeup was considered as a part of grooming and etiquette. This teaching came from the women's educational book, "Woman's Treasure" (女重宝記) published in 1692. The four major types of cosmetics in this period were: white powder, red lipstick, eyebrow, and tooth blackening. The powder was called Oshiroi. Oshiroi was made from mercury or lead. Women of high status used mercury. Ordinary women used lead as it was cheaper than mercury. In this period, it was believed that whitening was important. There was even a proverb that a woman with a white face hid seven problems. That means if a woman had a problem with her body or character, it would not be a problem as long as the woman had a white face.

Ohaguro was used for distinguishing status and situation. For instance, blackened teeth indicated that a woman was married, Additionally, shaved eyebrows indicated that a woman was someone's mother.

Makeup trends were influenced by sumptuary laws that were enacted by the Tokugawa Shogunate. These laws were established by the government because of their austerity policy. Since luxury was prohibited, it was thought that people should avoid heavy makeup and that light makeup was suitable. This notion was also mentioned in "Book of the Secret Mirror for Women" (女鏡秘伝書) published in 1650 and "Women's Instruction and Training Manual"(女用訓蒙図彙) published in 1678. According to these books, makeup should be done just for grooming and for showing politeness. However, while minimal makeup was popular in Edo, citizens who were in Kyoto and Osaka preferred heavy makeup to light makeup because they admired the makeup of the women of the Imperial Household. The women of the emperor's family wore heavy makeup to emphasize their glamorous appearance. One possible reason why such differences emerged in different regions is that people in Edo, where the shogunate was located, were strongly influenced by the sumptuary laws issued by the shogunate, whereas for the people in Osaka and Kyoto, where the emperor originally lived, was still influenced by the emperor.

=== The Meiji Period (1868–1912): modernization ===
This period was completely different from the previous period that had an isolation policy. The Meiji government actively tried to adopt the culture of other countries. In addition, the feudal system ended and a centralized system that gave sovereignty to the emperor began again. The government brought various kinds of knowledge and technology from the advanced countries of Europe and the United States to Japan. This policy had a great impact on Japan's cosmetic culture.

In this period, ohaguro and eyebrow shaving were rejected as old-fashioned makeup. Instead, new cosmetics and makeup methods were spread by new media such as daily newspapers and monthly magazines. In the early Meiji period, the government invited engineers from abroad and actively introduced technologies in the field of chemistry. It began to produce Westernized cosmetics domestically. Along with this trend, the predecessors of Shiseido and Kao, the current leaders in the cosmetics industry, also appeared. However, due to lack of technology and production capacity to produce western cosmetics, the prices were expensive. Thus, these products were popular only among the upper class.

Shiseido is the largest top share company in Japan and five largest shares in the world. More than 60% of sales come from overseas business, and the company is expanding its business in approximately 120 countries and regions around the world. This company was founded by Arinobu Fukuhara in Ginza, Tokyo in 1872. This was Japan's first private Westernized dispensing pharmacy. Shiseido sold Japan's first toothpaste in 1888, and they entered the cosmetic industry in 1897. After that, Shinzo Fukuhara was appointed president and director, and the current Shiseido Company, Limited, was born in 1927. After World War II, Shiseido began to expand overseas. Shiseido began selling its products in Taiwan in 1957, and then expanded their business to various countries including Italy, the United States, and Singapore. Shiseido increased its influence in the world by establishing new companies overseas and acquiring various overseas companies.

Tomio Nagase founded Nagase Shoten which was Kao Corporation’s predecessor in 1887. Kao Soap, a high-grade cosmetic soap, was launched in 1890, and the product was a big hit. This inspired the toiletry market in Japan. Some time after World War II, Kao established their first overseas operation base in Thailand in 1964. Since then, Kao has established bases not only in Asia, but also in Europe and the United States. As a result, the company has gained a big share of the overseas market. Kao has the third largest of the sales in Japan's cosmetics market.

=== The Taisho Period (1912–1926): Great War and special demand ===
Japan's economy was in a difficult situation due to the national debt created by the Russo-Japanese War. However, because of World War I breaking out in 1914, Japan's economy recovered and grew substantially.

Westernization progressed and people's lives were enriched. Western-style makeup became commonplace not only among the upper class but also among the general public. The movement of women into the workforce also contributed to the development of makeup culture because women were expected to groom themselves for work. Because of that, cosmetics which enabled women to put on makeup quickly became popular. In this period, major domestic companies modernized their production facilities, and the development of domestic cosmetics became more active. As a result, the product lineup increased significantly compared to the previous period. Japanese women still desired whiter faces, so more companies aggressively advertised products that claimed to whiten skin.

=== The Showa Period (1926–1944) ===
After the Axis' power's defeat in World War II, Japan was ruled by the United States. Despite this, Japan became a very influential country economically because of the Vietnam War. This is because many Japanese products were exported through wars that were not directly related to Japan.

==== Before and during the World War II (1926–1944) ====
With the spread of television and radio including magazines, information became more widespread in this period, and the information gap between rural and urban areas narrowed.

During the Showa period, there was a lot of exchange with overseas engineers on cosmetics, but trade controls began in 1937 during the Sino-Japanese War. That caused a serious problem in the cosmetic industry because a large tariff was placed on cosmetics from overseas. Because of the priority given to the military, makeup became very discreet, and the style of makeup was reduced to the minimum necessary for personal appearance. As imports from overseas became more difficult to obtain, the number of available cosmetic products decreased dramatically. In the last two years of the Pacific War, air raids made life difficult for many Japanese, and the amount of cosmetics products available dropped sharply. That is why this period was known as "blank period for cosmetics".

==== After World War II (1945–1989) ====
Many products were imported from the U.S. due to the U.S. presence in Japan. As people began to watch movies on color film, women imitated the makeup techniques of actresses. In the 1950s, more and more women wanted to look like Caucasian women and makeup shifted to pinpoint makeup that emphasized the lips and eyes in a Western style. With the spread of color TVs, major cosmetic companies began to focus on commercials in the 1960s, raising awareness of the importance of makeup. White skin was still a popular ideal for women. From the 1950s to the end of the Showa period, the trend of mass production and mass consumption which everyone owned and used the same things changed, and diversification and individualization progressed. As a result, a culture called "corrective makeup" became famous. This makeup style was used in that people could make use of one's individuality based on their facial parts. In addition to that, due to factors such as pollution and ultraviolet rays, people began to pay more attention to the environment and their health. Therefore, they began to buy cosmetics made from healthier ingredients and sunscreens. In the 1970s, eyebrows and eyes became important points for makeup. This trend was widely covered in magazines, and people believed that they could create the atmosphere they wanted by making-up their eyebrows and eyes. With the law for Equal Employment Opportunity of Men and Women in 1985, women expressed their strong will to be able to work in a male society by drawing thick eyebrows. On the other hand, at this time, there was a growing trend that men should not neglect to wear makeup as well. Because of that, some men tried to create a "masculine" look by using eyebrow pencil and foundation. However, not everyone accepted this movement. Some people believed that what makes you look good was from internal factors such as personality, compassion, and mentality, and not from external factors such as makeup.

=== The Heisei Period (1989–2019) ===
The trendsof the period were created by the popular actresses. In addition to that, popular magazines for teenage girls such as Non-no, Vivi, and Zipper appeared, and girls referred to the makeup methods of the models appearing in those magazines. As this environment developed, the age when women started wearing makeup became younger and younger, and this trend accelerated from the 1990s. Also, as in the Showa period, because women continued to place importance on makeup around the eyes, many of them used mascara to emphasize their eyes. On the other hand, foundation was still the main cosmetic product for women who aspired to have a clear skin.

== Male cosmetics ==
Among men, eyebrows, white powder, and Ohaguro had been used by court nobles since the Muromachi period. This type of makeup continued among the imperial family until the beginning of the Meiji period. However, as with the history of women's makeup, the influence of Westernization led to the demise of makeup such as white powder, eyebrow shaving, and Ohaguro. Instead of those practices, men began to pay more attention to beard and hairstyle because they wanted to show off their manliness as the government's policy of increasing wealth and military power spread. This is because they longed for Western culture and the beard was one of the parts that characterized the adult male. Thus, the way of makeup to make oneself look beautiful disappeared, and grooming to show off one's dignity and smartness became the mainstream. After the war, several cosmetic companies launched to sell products that promoted men's natural makeup, but they did not become as popular as the companies thought due to the rejection of the Meiji-period generation that put their importance on masculinity. One interesting trend, however, appeared. Men paid attention to the fashions and unique hairstyles that athletes appearing on TV wore. Therefore, they spent their time and money to obtain these desirable looks. Furthermore, as women began to enter the workforce because of the law for Equal Employment Opportunity of Men and Women, the conventional idea of masculinity faded away. Therefore, men began applying makeup for their beauty again.
