= Koinaka =

Japanese television series

- Promotional poster
- Also known as: KOINAKA ~ Best Friends in Love
- Japanese: 恋仲
- Genre: Drama; Romance
- Written by: Sayaka Kuwamura
- Directed by: Hiro Kanai; Shōgo Miyaki
- Starring: Sota Fukushi; Tsubasa Honda; Shūhei Nomura
- Ending theme: "Kimi ga Kureta Natsu" by Leo Ieiri
- Country of origin: Japan
- Original language: Japanese
- No. of episodes: 9

Production
- Producer: Ryōta Fujino
- Running time: 54–69 minutes

Original release
- Network: Fuji TV
- Release: July 20 – September 14, 2015

Koinaka (恋仲, KOINAKA ~ Best Friends in Love) is a Japanese television drama series premiered on Fuji TV from July 20, 2015, on Mondays at 21:00. It was directed by Hiro Kanai and Shōgo Miyaki, both of whom directed Summer Nude in 2013. The screenplay was written by Sayaka Kuwamura who is a screenwriter of the live-action version of Strobe Edge.

Sota Fukushi played the lead role for the first time in getsuku drama, Tsubasa Honda played his childhood friend, and Shūhei Nomura played his rival in love. They made a joint appearance in Enoshima Prism in 2013.

The first episode received a viewership rating of 9.8%, and the third episode recorded the highest rating of 11.9% in the Kantō region. The last episode was partially broadcast live, and Rino Sashihara appeared as a guest role.

== Cast ==
- Sota Fukushi as Aoi Miura, main character
- Tsubasa Honda as Akari Serizawa, Miura's childhood friend
- Shūhei Nomura as Shōta Aoi, Miura's childhood friend
- Taiga Nakano as Kōhei Kanazawa, Miura's childhood friend
- Sakurako Ohara as Nanami Miura, Aoi Miura's younger sister
- Yui Ichikawa as Ruiko Saeki, Miura's ex-girlfriend
- Yua Shinkawa as Kazuha Sawada, Shōta Aoi's co-worker
- Mizuki Yamamoto as Mirei Tominaga, senior worker at Miura's company
- Yō Yoshida as Mariko Niwa, chairman of Miura's company
- Kaoru Kobayashi as Hirotoshi Serizawa, Akari's father

== Episodes ==
No.	Title	Directed by	Original release date	Ratings (%)
1	"君がいた夏"	Hiro Kanai	July 20, 2015	9.8
2	"戻れない距離"	Hiro Kanai	July 27, 2015	9.9
3	"7年目の真実"	Shōgo Miyaki	August 3, 2015	11.9
4	"裏切り"	Shōgo Miyaki	August 10, 2015	10.8
5	"最後の花火"	Shōgo Miyaki	August 17, 2015	11.8
6	"決意"	Shōgo Miyaki	August 24, 2015	9.5
7	"告白"	Hiro Kanai	August 31, 2015	10.6
8	"結婚"	Shōgo Miyaki	September 7, 2015	10.9
9	"君がくれた夏"	Hiro Kanai	September 14, 2015	11.5

== International broadcast ==
- In Sri Lanka, it was aired on TV Derana with Sinhalese subtitles under the title, Best Friends in Love and premiered on June 7, 2018.

Preceded by Yōkoso, Wagaya e April 13, 2015 – June 15, 2015	Fuji TV Getsuku Drama; Mondays 21:00 – 21:54 (JST)	Succeeded by 5-ji Kara 9-ji Made: Watashi ni Koi Shita Obōsan; October 12, 2015 – December 14, 2015
