= Akiko Kuji =

Japanese announcer (born 1994)

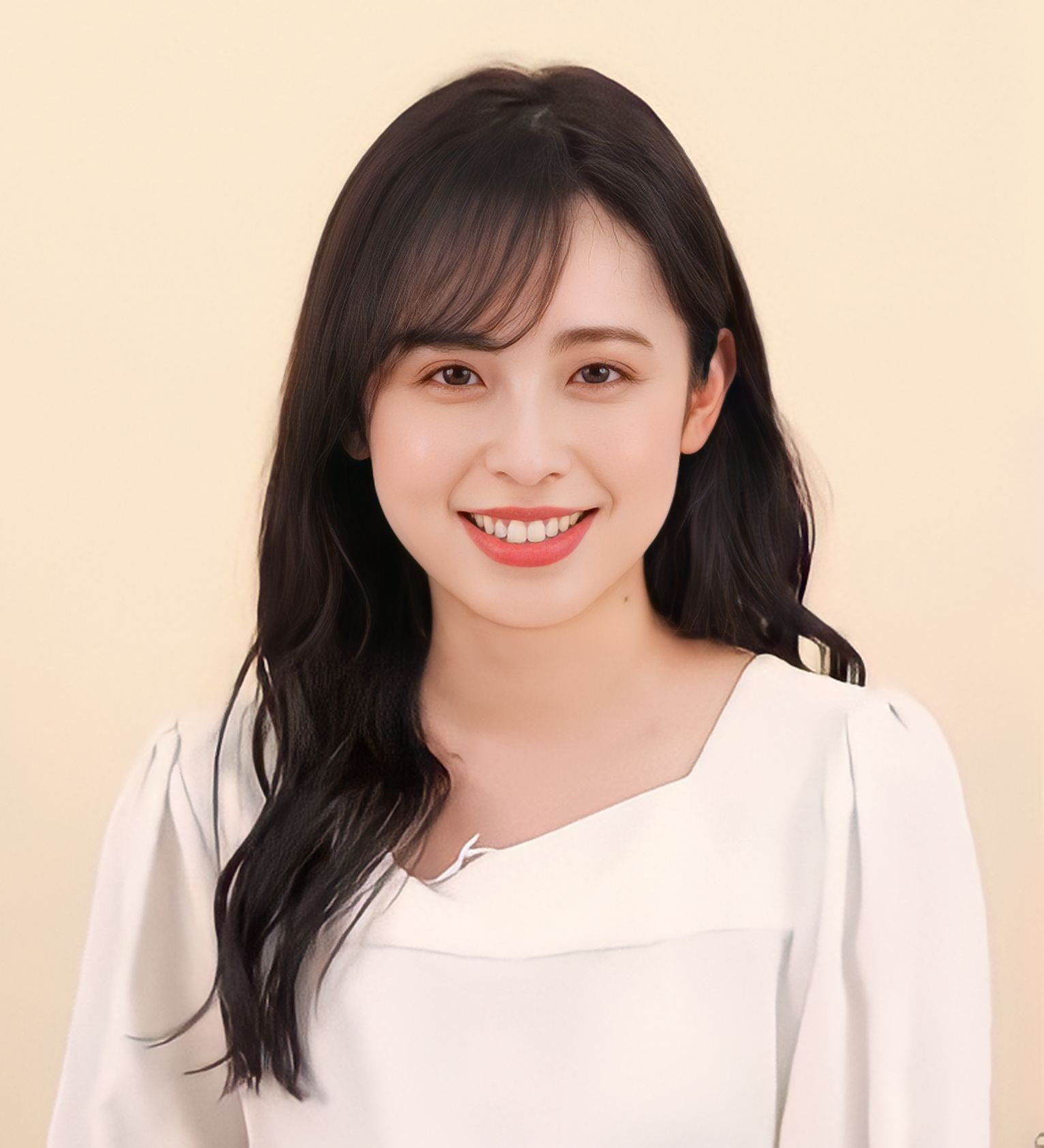
- Kuji in May 2023
- Born: 13 July 1994 (age 32); Ōshū, Iwate, Japan
- Other names: Aki-chan (あきちゃん); Akko (あっこ)
- Education: Aoyama Gakuin University (Economics)
- Occupations: Announcer; model; actress; television personality
- Years active: 2013–
- Known for: Non-no exclusive model (2014–17)
- Height: 166 cm (5 ft 5 in) (2017)
- Spouse: Yuta Watanabe (m. 2022)
- Children: 1

Japanese name
- Kanji: 久慈 暁子
- Hiragana: くじ あきこ
Transcriptions
- Romanization: Kuji Akiko

Akiko Kuji (久慈 暁子, Kuji Akiko; born 13 July 1994) is a Japanese actress, announcer, model, and television personality. She served as an announcer for Fuji Television from 2017 until 2022.

== Biography ==
Akiko Kuji was born in Ōshū, Iwate. She has the height of 166 cm (5 ft 5 1/2 in). She spent 18 years in Iwate Prefecture from her birth to her high school graduation. She is a graduate from Mizusawa High School and an alumna of Aoyama Gakuin University, where she majored in economics.

In 2013, she entered the entertainment industry. In March 2014, she was selected in the Asahi Kasei Group Campaign Model 2014. There was PR work from Ōshū city after this. In July, she debuted as an actress in a television drama in Kin Kyori Renai: Season Zero. In August she was selected in the Grand Prix at the 45th non-no model audition and became a magazine exclusive model from the November 2014 issue until April 2017. Until she graduated from college she belonged to Illume (Incent).

In April 2017, she joined Fuji Television as an announcer.

On 30 April 2022, she officially left Fuji Television as an announcer. On 1 May 2022, she became a freelance announcer. She also made a comeback to entertainment industry as a fashion model, tarento, and actress. She rejoined her agency, Incent during college.

== Personal life ==
Kuji has been familiar with English from a young age due to the influence of her mother, who used to teach English in high school.

On 26 May 2022, she announced her marriage to professional NBA player Yuta Watanabe.

On 13 April 2026, she gave birth to her first child.

== Filmography ==
=== Freelance announcer era ===
==== Current appearance programmes ====
Dates	Title	Network	Notes

=== Fuji TV announcer era ===
==== Television appearances ====
Dates	Title	Notes
9 Jun 2017	Downtown Now	
6 – 30 Jun 2017	Yoru no Announcer Kenshū	
4 Jul – 30 Sep 2017	Kujipan	
2 Oct 2017 – 25 Mar 2021	Mezamashi TV	
24 Nov 2018 – 26 Sep 2020	Ukemen	
6 Apr 2019 – 2 Apr 2022	Mezamashi Doyōbi	
28 Sep 2020 – 15 Mar 2021	Viking More	
30 Mar 2021 – 22 Mar 2022	Mezamashi 8	Information anchor
3 Apr 2021 – 26 Mar 2021	Sanma no Owarai Kōjō Iinkai	Assistant

==== Films ====
Year	Title	Role	Notes
2019	Hit me Anyone One More Time	Miss Shirataki	
2020	Not Quite Dead Yet	Announcer	

=== Modelling era ===
==== TV programmes ====
Dates	Title	Network	Notes	Ref.
26 Aug 2014 – 19 May 2015	Riga Weekend Preview	Wowow Members On Demand	Third Generation Legirl	

==== Television advertisements ====
Dates	Product	Ref.
Dec 2013 –	SoftBank Mobile 4G LTE	
Jan 2015 –	Asahi Kasei Fudousan Residence Hebel Rooms	
Nov 2015 –	Kao Corporation Keep Natural & Keep	

==== Advertising ====
Year	Title	Ref.
2014	Asahi Kasei Group Campaign Model	

==== TV dramas ====
Dates	Title	Role	Network	Notes
20 Jul – 12 Oct 2014	Kin Kyori Renai	Asarie Sakai	NTV	
19 Jun 2015	The Last Cop	Marika Mizushima	NTV	
21 Nov 2015	Yo nimo Kimyō na Monogatari: Fall 2015 Special	Saori Tamura	Fuji TV	
Apr 2016 –	4K Original Drama Koiko Focus: Aru Tenkōsei no Monogatari	Koiko Mizusawa	Hikari TV Channel, mit	Lead role

==== Runways ====
Year	Title	Ref.
2014	Girls Award 2014 Autumn/Winter	
2015	Girls Award 2015 Spring/Summer	
2015	Girls Award 2015 Autumn/Winter	
2022	Girls Award 2022 Spring/Summer	

== Bibliography ==
=== Magazine serialisations ===
Title	No.	Publisher	Notes	Ref.
non-no	Nov 2014 – Apr 2017	Shueisha	Exclusive model	
