= Yuuna Suzuki =

Japanese model and actress (born 1992)

- 鈴木 友菜
- Born: 11 August 1992 (age 32); Tokyo, Japan
- Other names: Yuuna (ゆうな, Yūna)
- Occupations: Model; actress
- Spouse: Unknown (m. 2024)
- Modeling information
- Height: 165 cm (5 ft 5 in)

Yuuna Suzuki (鈴木 友菜, Suzuki Yūna, born 11 August 1992) is a Japanese model and actress from Tokyo, who has appeared in a number of television drama series and variety shows, as well as featuring in magazines including as a cover model. She is affiliated with the talent agency Space Craft.

== Personal life ==
On 31 December 2024, she revealed on Instagram that she got married in February.

== Appearances ==
=== TV dramas ===
- Jigoku Shōjo Episode 10 (2007, NTV) – as Mika Kazama
- Keishichō Sōsaikkachō Season 3 Episode 5 (10 May 2018, TV Asahi) – as Naomi Kadowaki (Diet Secretary member)

=== Variety ===
- Gekimote! Seventeen Gakuen (Jul 2009 – Mar 2010, BS-TBS) – Regular.
- Kurashi no Sapuri! Shūgō! Suzuki Sanshimai (Oct 2011 – Jun 2012, BS Asahi) – Co-stars: Sawa Suzuki, Ami Suzuki.
- Sunderu Hito ga Mitai! Sekai no Chō! Zekkei House (28 Dec 2013, TV Tokyo)
- Sunderu Hito ga Mitai! Sekai no Chō! Zekkei House 2 (16 Jul 2014, TV Tokyo)
- Chikyū 30,000km! Kiseki no Ie e: Sekai no Chō! Zekkei House 4 (22 Jul 2015, TV Tokyo)

=== Webcasts ===
- Rinshō Hanzai Gakusha: Hideo Himura no Suiri Another Story 2–3 (released on Hulu from 27 Mar 2016, NTV) – as Mari.

=== Stills ===
- Sundai Preparatory School (2005) – Poster.
- Tirol-Choco Ichigo Musume Daihyō (2006) – Image girl.
- Cecile Cupop (2007 –)
- Avail (Mar 2014 –) – Image girl.

=== Advertisements ===
- Tokyu Security (2006)
- Pentel Slicci "Jinx 1" (2007)
- Rohto Pharmaceutical Mentholatum Moist Tiara (24 Jul 2010 –) – Co-starred with Ayame Goriki, Mayuko Arisue and Anri Okamoto.
- Central Nippon Expressway Company company advert "Sā, Kōsoku de Ikou!" (2012)
- GREE – Grani Production social-network game "Kamigoku no Valhalla Gate" (2015) – Co-starred with Rena Takeda and Anna Tsuboi.
- Kao Corporation Cape (2016)
- McDonald's Japan – McShake Ripe Kiwi (2017)

=== Films ===
- Intern! (5 Nov 2016) – as Sayuri Shiratori

=== Music videos ===
- Monkey Majik "Aitakute"

== Publications ==
=== Photo albums ===
- Yuuna (26 Oct 2013, Wani Books)

=== Magazine serialisations ===
- Nicola (Shinchosha)
- CM Now (Genkosha)
- Seventeen (31 Jan 2009 – 1 Mar 2014, Shueisha) – Exclusive model.
- non-no (20 Mar 2014 –, Shueisha) – Exclusive model.

=== As a cover model ===
- Tsūgaku Densha: Kimi to Boku no Heya (By Miyu, 30 Jul 2010, Cobalt Bunko)
- Tsūgaku Densha: Kimi to Boku no Heya (Original work: Miyu, Illustration: Tsukishima Coral, 30 Jul 2010, Margaret Comics) (comicalized paperback version)
