= Fashion Story: Model =

- Film poster
- Directed by: Sayaka Nakamura
- Written by: Hiroko Kanasugi
- Produced by: Chikako Nakabayashi
- Starring: Tsubasa Honda; Seira Kagami; Mayuko Kawakita
- Cinematography: Junji Aoki
- Edited by: Yuriko Hosono
- Music by: May J.
- Production companies: F.S. Film Partners; All In Entertainment Inc.; Asia Pictures Limited; Office Ohfuji Reiichiro Inc.; Laughter Inc.; Wako Inc.
- Distributed by: United Entertainment Inc.
- Release date: November 17, 2012
- Running time: 84 minutes
- Country: Japan
- Language: Japanese

Fashion Story: Model is a 2012 Japanese film directed by Sayaka Nakamura.

== Cast ==
- Tsubasa Honda as Hinako, a young novice fashion model
- Seira Kagami as Miho, a popular veteran model
- Mayuko Kawakita as Rena, a fashion model
- Satomi Tezuka as Morisaki, chief editor
- Yōzaburō Itō as Takuma, a cameraman who is in a relationship with Miho
- Yū Koyanagi as Kōichirō, a male fashion model
- Ayane Nagabuchi
- Ayaka Morita
- Riho Takada
- Maryjun Takahashi
- Yumi Higashino
- Chinami Suzuki
- Nanami Abe
- Kaede Sekikawa
- Megumi Asahina
- Ayane Fukuma
- Saki Toyoba
- Maiko Takahashi
- Tou Katsu
- Takamasa Suga
