= Sota Fukushi =

Japanese actor (born 1993)

- 福士 蒼汰
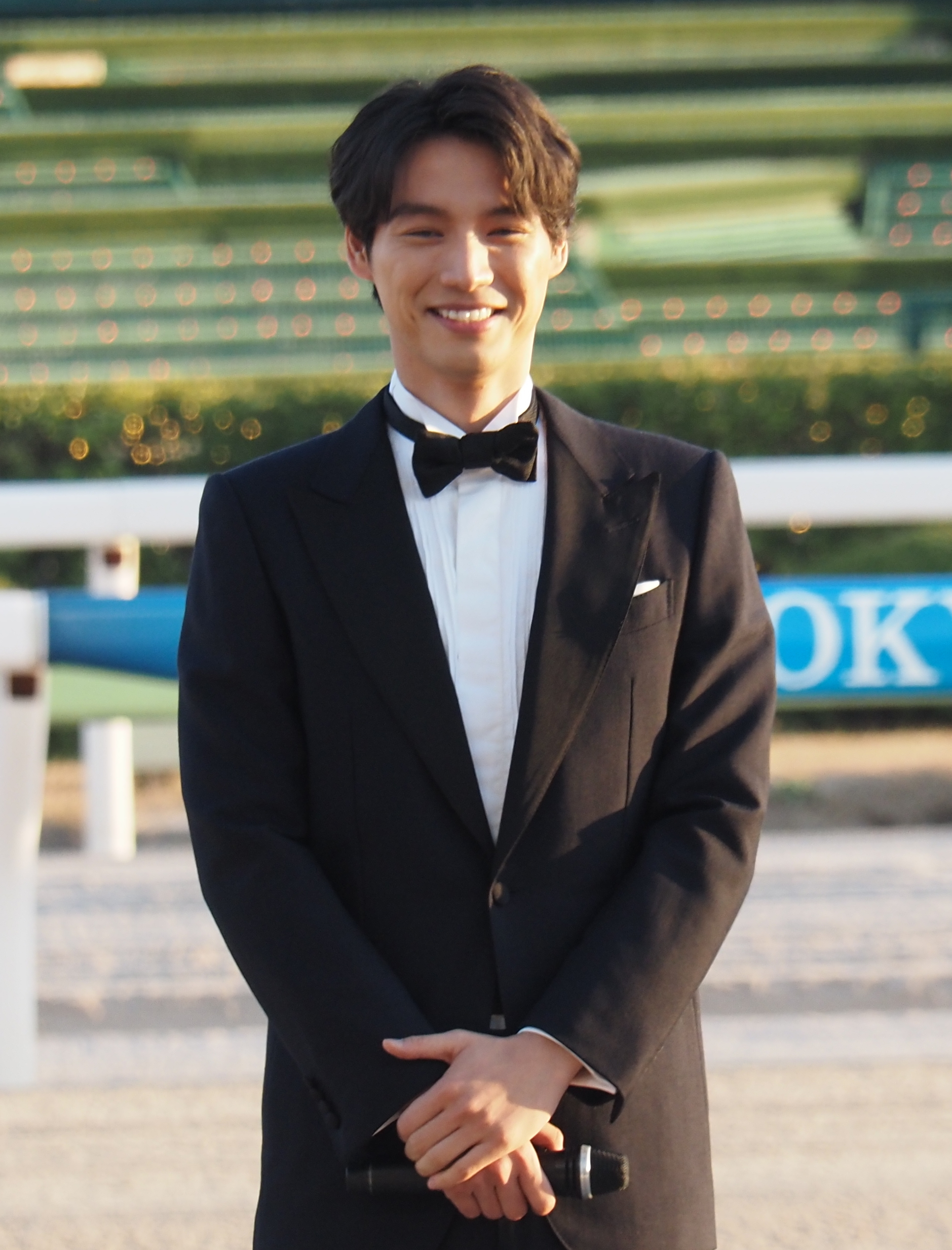
- Fukushi in December 2023
- Born: May 30, 1993 (age 33); Tokyo, Japan
- Occupation: Actor
- Years active: 2010–present
- Agent: Ken-On
- Website: ken-on.co.jp/fukushi

Sota Fukushi (福士 蒼汰, Fukushi Sōta; born May 30, 1993) is a Japanese actor. He first rose to prominence portraying Gentaro Kisaragi in Kamen Rider Fourze (2011–2012). He has since had notable roles in television series Koinaka (2015) and My Lover's Secret (2017), as well as films Say I Love You (2014), As the Gods Will (2014), Strobe Edge (2015), My Tomorrow, Your Yesterday (2016), Bleach (2018), and Kaiji: Final Game (2020).

== Early life and education ==
Sota Fukushi was born on May 30, 1993 in Tokyo, Japan. During his school days, he was a member of the basketball club until middle school and the Double Dutch club in high school. His prominent early influences were actors Teruyuki Kagawa and Junichi Okada. It was the influence of Okada that Fukushi decided to learn Jeet Kune Do and Arnis and Kagawa that he had goals of acting in period dramas to become a versatile actor. He has expressed a keen interest in learning English since middle school after receiving praise and encouragement from his middle school English teacher. His interest was further fuelled by his aspirations to be an international actor. He holds a Grade 2 Eiken certificate.

== Career ==
=== 2010–2012: Beginnings and Kamen Rider Fourze ===
After entering high school, Fukushi was shopping in Shibuya with a friend when he was approached to be photographed. He agreed, and his pictures were subsequently featured in a magazine. Fukushi was scouted by Ken-On after a person at the agency saw his photos in the magazine. He joined the agency on September 21, 2010. In January 2011, he made his official acting debut in the NTV drama, Misaki Number One!!.

Three months after his debut, he auditioned for the lead role in Kamen Rider Fourze and was selected from approximately 3,000 applicants for the role of Gentaro Kisaragi. Among the selected candidates was Ryuki Takahashi, who was chosen to co-star as Kengo Utahoshi. During the final interview to select a partner, Fukushi selected Takahashi, and the two actors engaged in a dialogue exchange on a subject provided to them. The show aired from September 4, 2011 to August 26, 2012 on TV Asahi. However, prior to the broadcast of Kamen Rider Fourze, Fukushi made his first appearance as Gentaro Kisaragi in Kamen Rider OOO Wonderful: The Shogun and the 21 Core Medals, marking his film debut. The film was released on August 6, 2011. He would then go on to appear in the film Kamen Rider × Kamen Rider Fourze & OOO: Movie War Mega Max later that year, where he assumed the leading role in a film for the first time. The film was released on December 10, 2011. He would go on to dedicate most of 2012 appearing in Kamen Rider related media.

=== 2013–2022: Breakthrough and leading roles ===
Coming out of the Kamen Rider series, Fukushi then appeared in the NHK television drama Amachan in 2013. He played the role of Koichi Taneichi, a high school senior who the heroine falls in love with at first sight. The show was broadcast from April 1 to September 28, 2013. The drama achieved high viewership ratings, which increased Fukushi's popularity and public recognition. That same year, he appeared in the films Library Wars and Enoshima Prism. His success would continue to be recognised with him ranking first in both the "Breakthrough Actor Ranking for the First Half of 2013" and "Breakthrough Actor Ranking for 2014", according to Oricon.

In 2014, Fukushi led the romance film Say "I Love You" alongside Haruna Kawaguchi. The film premiered on July 12, 2014. It was considered a success, garnering almost 500,000 viewers within the first two weeks of its release. He then starred in the Japanese supernatural horror film As the Gods Will, directed by Takashi Miike. It is based on the first arc of the eponymous manga series by Muneyuki Kaneshiro and Akeji Fujimura. For the film's international release, Fukushi made his international film festival debut at the 9th Rome International Film Festival held in October, 2014. At the official press conference, he greeted the audience in fluent Italian, followed by a speech in English.

In 2015, he starred in the romance film Strobe Edge alongside Kasumi Arimura. The film was released on March 14, 2015. In July, he played the lead role in Fuji TV's Koinaka. That same year, he was awarded the Best New Actor Award at the 38th Japan Academy Awards for his roles in the films Say "I Love You", In the Hero, and As the Gods Will.

In 2016, he appeared in the romance film My Tomorrow, Your Yesterday alongside Nana Komatsu, a live-action adaptation of the novel of the same name. He played Takatoshi Minamiyama, an arts school student who falls in love at first sight on the train to school. The film was released on December 17, 2016.

In 2017, he appeared in the films To Each His Own and Blade of the Immortal. He also reprised his role as Gentaro Kisaragi for the first time in five years in Kamen Rider Heisei Generations Final: Build & Ex-Aid with Legend Rider, which was released on December 9, 2017. That same year, he starred in the NTV mystery drama, My Lover's Secret. He also made his stage debut playing the leading role of Sutenosuke in Gekidan Shinkansen "Seven Souls in the Skull Castle" Season Moon Waxing Crescent Moon. The play ran from November 23, 2017 to February 21, 2018.

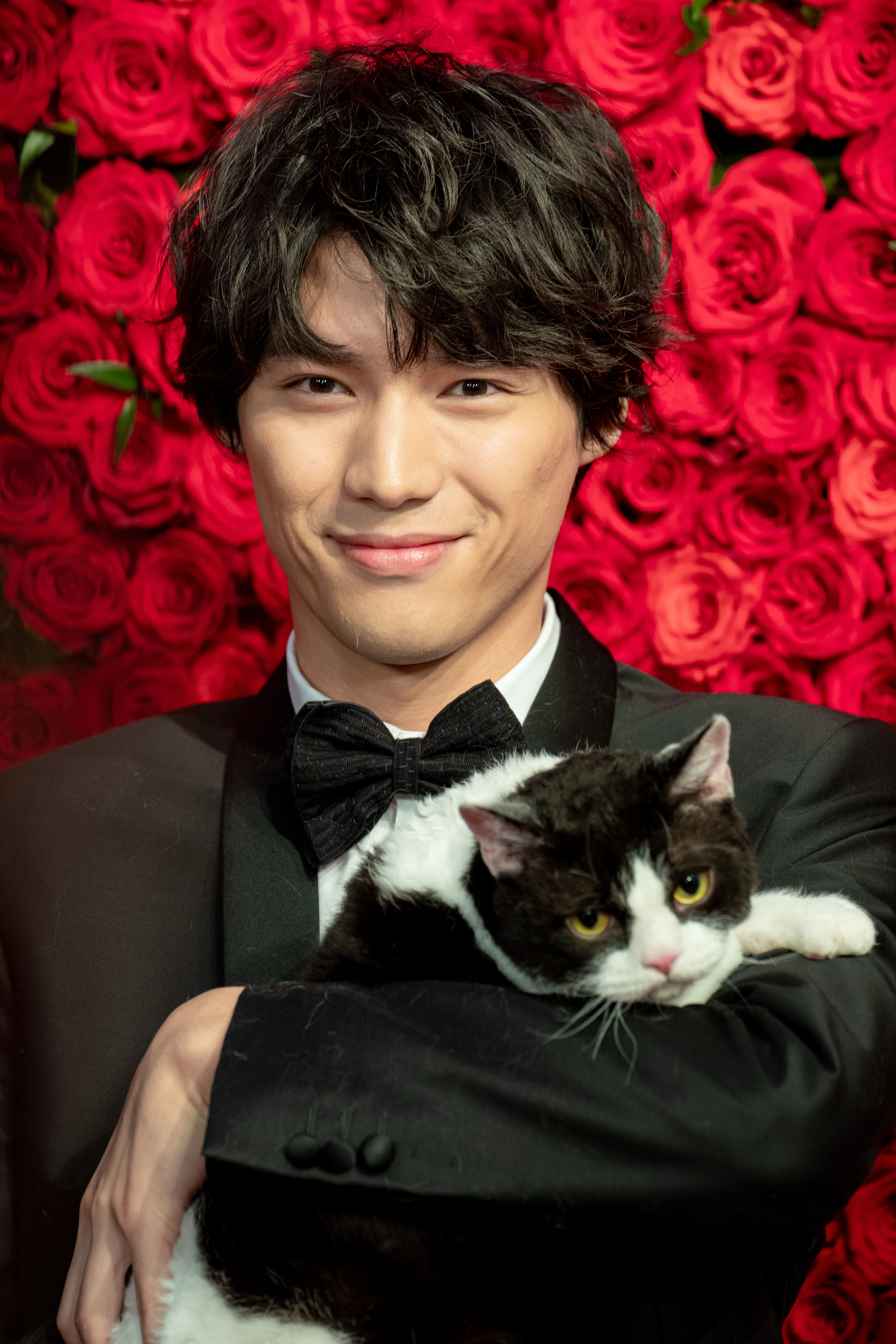
Fukushi at the 31st Tokyo International Film Festival in 2018

In 2018, Fukushi worked with director Takashi Miike for a third time in the film Laplace's Witch. The film was released on May 4, 2018. He also played Ichigo Kurosaki in Bleach, a live-action film adaptation of the manga series of the same name. The film was released on July 20, 2018. He then starred in the film The Travelling Cat Chronicles, which was released on October 26, 2018.

In 2019, he starred in the TBS dramas Heaven?: My Restaurant, My Life, Marigold in 4 Minutes and the film The Fable.

In 2020, he portrayed Kōsuke Takakura in the film Kaiji: Final Game. He then starred in the historical suspense drama Meiji Kaika: Shinjuro Tanteicho as Shinjuro Yuki, a detective who is considered the Meiji Sherlock Holmes. The show's original broadcast was postponed due to COVID-19. The first episode premiered on December 11, 2020. He also appeared in the show Diver: Special Investigation Unit as the main hero, Kurosawa Hyougo.

In February 2021, Fukushi took on his first role as a doctor in the TV Tokyo production In His Chart. He portrayed the main character, Ichito Kurihara. He then played Eisuke Saijo in the drama Avalanche.

In 2022, he starred in Hoshi Kara Kita Anata, the Japanese remake of the popular South Korean drama My Love from the Star. He portrayed Mitsuru Higashiyama, an alien secretly living on Earth. The show was released as an Amazon Original drama available exclusively on Prime Video from February 23, 2022.

=== 2023–present: Venture into international roles ===
In 2023, Fukushi starred in his first overseas project in season two of Hulu's original series The Head with an English-language role. He portrayed computer engineer Yuto Nakamura and travelled to Spain to film the show. It was released for streaming on Hulu on June 17, 2023. That same year, he played the role of a lawyer in TV Tokyo's drama Attorney Sodom as Wataru Odagiri. The show premiered on April 28, 2023.

In 2024, Fukushi made his film comeback in The Women in the Lakes playing detective Keisuke Hamanaka. The film was originally set to be released in November, 2023, but was postponed. The film was released in theatres on May 17, 2024. He then starred in the TV Asahi drama Ai no Nai Koibitotachi as 33-year-old unsuccessful scriptwriter Masakazu Kume. The first episode aired on January 21, 2024.

On June 27, 2024, Netflix confirmed Fukushi's participation in their upcoming series Can This Love Be Translated?, marking his first South Korean project. He acted as a famous actor Hiro Kurasawa, a love rival of interpreter Joo Ho-jin to fight for affection of actress Cha Mu-hee. The filming wrapped in February 2025, and was released on Netflix on January 16, 2026.

== Filmography ==
=== Films ===
Year	Title	Role	Notes	Ref.
2011	Kamen Rider OOO Wonderful: The Shogun and the 21 Core Medals	Gentaro Kisaragi/Kamen Rider Fourze	Cameo	
2011	Kamen Rider × Kamen Rider Fourze & OOO: Movie War Mega Max	Gentaro Kisaragi/Kamen Rider Fourze	Lead role	
2012	Kamen Rider × Super Sentai: Super Hero Taisen	Gentaro Kisaragi/Kamen Rider Fourze		
2012	Kamen Rider Fourze the Movie: Everyone, Space Is Here!	Gentaro Kisaragi/Kamen Rider Fourze	Lead role	
2012	In the Future, When I Am Executed	Yukio Asao	Lead role	
2012	Kamen Rider × Kamen Rider Wizard & Fourze: Movie War Ultimatum	Gentaro Kisaragi/Kamen Rider Fourze	Lead role	
2013	Kamen Rider × Super Sentai × Space Sheriff: Super Hero Taisen Z	Gentaro Kisaragi/Kamen Rider Fourze	Voice only	
2013	Library Wars	Hikaru Tezuka		
2013	Enoshima Prism	Shūta Jōgasaki	Lead role	
2014	Detective Conan: Dimensional Sniper	Kevin Yoshino	Voice only	
2014	Say "I Love You"	Yamato Kurosawa	Lead role	
2014	Unsung Hero	Ryo Ichinose		
2014	As the Gods Will	Shun Takahata	Lead role	
2015	Strobe Edge	Ren Ichinose	Lead role	
2015	Library Wars: The Last Mission	Hikaru Tezuka		
2016	My Tomorrow, Your Yesterday	Takatoshi Minamiyama	Lead role	
2017	To Each His Own	Yamamoto	Lead role	
2017	Kamen Rider Heisei Generations Final: Build & Ex-Aid with Legend Rider	Gentaro Kisaragi/Kamen Rider Fourze		
2017	Blade of the Immortal	Kagehisa Anotsu		
2018	Laughing Under the Clouds	Tenka Kumō	Lead role	
2018	Bleach	Ichigo Kurosaki	Lead role	
2018	The Travelling Cat Chronicles	Satoru Miyawaki	Lead role	
2018	Laplace's Witch	Kento Amakasu		
2019	The Fable	Hood		
2020	Kaiji: Final Game	Kōsuke Takakura		
2024	The Women in the Lakes	Keisuke Hamanaka	Lead role	
2025	Kaede	Ryo	Lead role	
2026	Tokyo Burst: Crime City		Japanese–Korean film	
TBA	The Scar-Faced Cat: Way of Asura	Sho Shimizu	Lead role; Taiwanese film	

=== Television series ===
Year	Title	Role	Notes	Ref.
2011	Misaki Number One!!	Sōta Murano		
2011	Shima Shima	Shuji Makomo		
2011	Umareru	Yuya Yamanaka		
2011–12	Kamen Rider Fourze	Gentaro Kisaragi / Kamen Rider Fourze	Lead role	
2013	Amachan	Kōichi Taneichi	Asadora	
2013	Starman・Love in Earth	Hoshio (Tatsuya)		
2013	About First Marriage Proposal	Motorcycle courier rider	Short drama	
2013	A Clinic on the Sea	Noboru Misaki		
2014	Trick New Special 3	Akira Mizukami		
2014	Baseball Braniacs	Kimiyasu Akaiwa		
2014	I'm Taking the Day Off	Yūto Tanokura		
2015	Koinaka: Best Friends in Love	Aoi Miura	Lead role	
2016	Goodbye Ghosts!	Madoka Tsutsumi	Lead role	
2016	Montage	Yamato Narumi	Lead role; mini-series	
2017	My Lover's Secret	Rei Okumori	Lead role	
2019	Heaven?: My Restaurant, My Life	Kan Iga		
2019	Marigold in 4 Minutes	Mikoto Hanamaki	Lead role	
2020	Diver: Special Investigation Unit	Kurosawa Hyougo	Lead role	
2020–21	Meiji Kaika: Shinjuro Tanteicho	Shinjuro Yuki	Lead role	
2021	In His Chart	Ichito Kurihara	Lead role; mini-series	
2021	Avalanche	Eisuke Saijo		
2022	Hoshi Kara Kita Anata	Mitsuru Higashiyama	Lead role	
2023	Ōoku: The Inner Chambers	Madenokōji Arikoto and Tenshō-in Taneatsu		
2023	NoMAD Workout	Trainer Fuku		
2023	Attorney Sodom	Wataru Odagiri		
2023	The Head	Yuto Nakamura	Season 2	
2024	Loveless Lovers	Masakazu Kume		
2026	Can This Love Be Translated?	Hiro Kurosawa	Korean drama	

== Stage ==
=== Theatre ===
Year	Title		Role	Venue	Date	Ref.
Year	English	Japanese	Role	Venue	Date	Ref.
2017–2018	Gekidan Shinkansen "Seven Souls in the Skull Castle" Season Moon Waxing Crescent Moon	劇団 新感線『髑髏城の七人』Season月 上弦の月	Sutenosuke	IHI Stage Around, Tokyo	November 23, 2017 – February 21, 2018	
2020	Village Produce 2020 Series Another Style "Urashima-san"	ヴィレッヂプロデュース2020 Series Another Style『浦島さん』	Urashima Taro	Tokyo Tatemono Brillia HALL	October 4–17	
2021	Reading plays "I Can't Forget, I Can't Forget", "First Love That Won't Return, Ebina SA", and "Kalashnikov's Adultery Strait", written and directed by Yuji Sakamoto	朗読劇『忘れえぬ 忘れえぬ』『不帰の初恋、海老名SA』『カラシニコフ不倫海峡』		Yomiuri Otemachi Hall, Tokyo	April 22	
2021	Reading plays "I Can't Forget, I Can't Forget", "First Love That Won't Return, Ebina SA", and "Kalashnikov's Adultery Strait", written and directed by Yuji Sakamoto	朗読劇『忘れえぬ 忘れえぬ』『不帰の初恋、海老名SA』『カラシニコフ不倫海峡』		Matsushita IMP Hall, Osaka	April 30–May 2	
2022	Gekidan Shinkansen 42nd Anniversary Performance Spring Performance Inoue Kabuki "Shinshu Burai-gai"	劇団 新感線 42周年興行 春公演 いのうえ歌舞伎『神州無頼街』	Akitsu Nagaru	Orix Theater	March 17–29	
2022	Gekidan Shinkansen 42nd Anniversary Performance Spring Performance Inoue Kabuki "Shinshu Burai-gai"	劇団 新感線 42周年興行 春公演 いのうえ歌舞伎『神州無頼街』	Akitsu Nagaru	Fuji City Cultural Center Rose Theater Large Hall	April 9–12	
2022	Gekidan Shinkansen 42nd Anniversary Performance Spring Performance Inoue Kabuki "Shinshu Burai-gai"	劇団 新感線 42周年興行 春公演 いのうえ歌舞伎『神州無頼街』	Akitsu Nagaru	Tokyo Tatemono Brillia HALL	April 26–May 28	

== Bibliography ==
=== Photobooks ===
Year	Title	Publisher	Date Published	ISBN	Ref.
2012	After Chicken Rice Go To Merlion: Sōta Fukushi's First Photobook	Tokyo News Service	May 30, 2012	ISBN 9784863362345	
2012	Men's Photore Vol.2 Sōta Fukushi	Tokyo News Service	August 22, 2012	ISBN 9784863362628	
2013	Blue	Wani Books	September 20, 2013	ISBN 9784847045714	
2015	Fukushi Sōta no "Hajimete no ◯◯"	Shufunotomo	June 5, 2015	ISBN 9784074123469	

== Awards ==
Year	Award	Category	Work(s)	Result	Ref.
2014	38nd Elan d'or Awards	Newcomer of the Year	Himself	Won	
2015	38th Japan Academy Film Prize	Newcomer of the Year	Say I Love You, In the Hero, As the Gods Will	Won	
2019	7th Japan Action Awards	Best Action Actor – Excellence Award	Bleach, Laughing Under the Clouds	Won	
