= Tou Katsu =

Japanese actor and model (born 1982)

- Born: February 5, 1982 (age 44); Osaka, Japan
- Occupations: Actor, Model
- Website: DOMO model, actor and creator agency

Tou Katsu (加津 塔, Katsu Tō) (born 5 February 1982) (originally named Tetsuya Katsu 勝哲也) is a Japanese actor and model born in Osaka, Japan. He won the grand prix at a Men's Non-no model audition. Afterwards, he moved to Tokyo from Osaka and started his modelling career. He is known for modeling in Rudo (Japanese magazine), Zozo Town, and Tokyo collection. Recently he expanded his career from modeling to acting. His trademark is his black long hair.

== Filmography ==
=== Film ===
- Fashion Story: Model (2012)
- Bright Audition (2014)

=== Short film ===
- ame soeur(2013)
- Ogori no Haru(2013)
- 大展望 Teyaman (2013)

== Television dramas ==
- MTV Shibuhara Girls2
- NHK BS premium Cambrian Wars
- BeeTV Mitsu-Fechi
