= Yuuka Suzuki =

Japanese model and actress (born 1996)

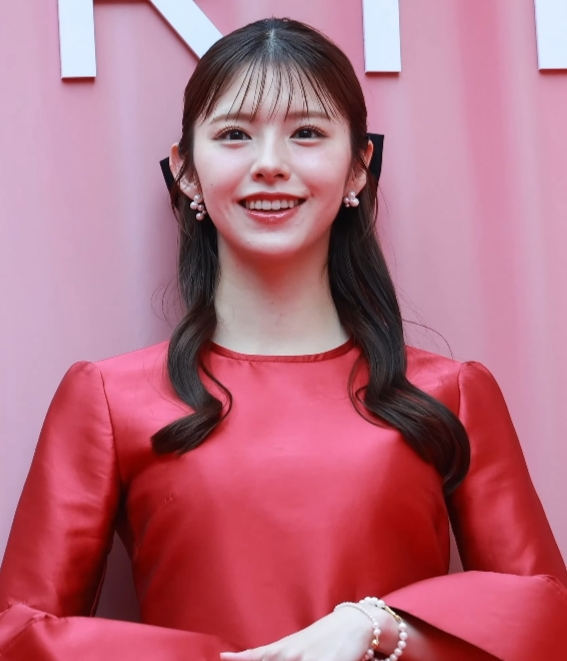
- Suzuki in May 2025
- Born: August 1, 1996 (age 29); Tokyo, Japan
- Occupations: Model; actress
- Years active: 2014–present
- Agent: Platinum Production
- Modeling information
- Height: 165 cm (5 ft 5 in)
- Hair color: Black
- Eye color: Brown

Japanese name
- Kanji: 鈴木ゆうか
- Hiragana: すずき ゆうか
Transcriptions
- Romanization: Suzuki Yūka

Yuuka Suzuki (鈴木ゆうか, Suzuki Yūka; born August 1, 1996) is a Japanese model and actress. She is best known as an exclusive model for the women's fashion magazine Non-no for over ten years.

== Career ==
Suzuki had dreamed of entering the entertainment industry since she was in the fifth grade of elementary school, but her father was against it, so she had to put her plans on hold. After she entered high school, she learned that Mirei Kiritani, whom she looks up to, had moved from Seventeen to Non-no magazine. She then decided to follow in Kiritani's footsteps and become a Non-no model as well.

Suzuki became an exclusive model for the women's fashion magazine Non-no by Shueisha from its November issue released on September 20, 2014. On November 15 of the same year, she made her acting debut in the film As the Gods Will.

In February 2016, she made her television debut in the drama MARS: Just Because I Love You. In April, she appeared in a swimsuit for the first time for the 19th issue of Weekly Young Jump photo shoot.

Suzuki "graduated" from being an exclusive model for Non-no magazine after ten years. Her final appearance was in their December issue, which was released on October 19, 2024.

== Filmography ==
=== Film ===
Year	Title	Role	Note	Ref.
2014	As the Gods Will	Student	Cameo	
2022	Flame Cinderella	Yurie Suzuhara		

=== Television drama ===
Year	Title	Role	Note	Ref.
2016	Mars	Kaori Nishino	Episodes 2 & 4	
2019	4 Minutes of Marigold	Koto Endo		
2019	Re: Follower	Natsumi Shimoura	Episode 2	
2020	Younger Boyfriend	Sakurako	Lead role	
2021	I Don't Know the Answer to Fashion	Aika Sudo		
2021	Pink, Apricot, Cherry Blossom	Yuka Negishi		
2021	Girl Gun Lady	Rin Otake		
2021	Silver Plan: Starting Over as a High School Girl	Sayuri Ninomiya	Lead role	
2022	Number MG5	Yayoi Makino	Episode 6	
2022	True Scary Stories	Chihiro Koyama	Lead role; single-episode drama	
2022	Seven Days of a Daddy and a Daughter	Rinka Fujino	Episode 6	
2023	But they Still Wanted to Get Married, they Said.	Amane Shinohara	Lead role	
2023	Stand Up Start	Chisato Omori	Episode 2	
2023	I Inherited a Host Club	Rui/Natsumi Shindou		
2023	Spring is Short, so Fall in Love, Boys.	Beni Minazuki	Episode 7	
2023	18/40: Unbreakable Bond of Dreams	Emi Morio		
2023	Their Crimes	Nagisa Igawa		
2023	Boys with Secrets	Eri Shiraki		
2024	The Corporate Executioner: She Eliminates Her Enemies	Eiko Minegishi	Episode 3 and 10	
2024	Mitsutasarezu, Tomerarezu	Miho Machida	Lead role	
2025	Problem Property	Kyomi Shida	Episode 1	
2025	The Devil of the Group Date: The Brilliant Revenge of the Betrayed Wives	Mizuki Yajima	Web series	

== Bibliography ==
=== Magazine ===
- Non-no (September 20, 2014– October 19, 2024, Shueisha)– Exclusive model
- andGIRL (December 6, 2024, DONUTS)– Regular model

=== Photobook ===
- Yuu Pace (July 20, 2021)

=== Calendar ===
- 2024 Calendar (November 18, 2023)
