= Laplace's Witch (film) =

2018 Japanese mystery film

- Directed by: Takashi Miike
- Screenplay by: Hiroyuki Yatsu
- Based on: Laplace's Witch (novel) by Keigo Higashino
- Produced by: Shigeji Maeda; Misako Saka
- Starring: Shō Sakurai; Suzu Hirose; Sōta Fukushi; Mirai Shida; Eriko Satō; Tao Okamoto
- Cinematography: Nobuyasu Kita
- Edited by: Kenji Yamashita
- Music by: Kōji Endō
- Production companies: Rakueisha; OLM, Inc. Toho Pictures
- Distributed by: Toho Co.
- Release date: May 4, 2018 (Japan)
- Running time: 116 minutes
- Country: Japan
- Language: Japanese
- Box office: $11 million

Laplace's Witch (Japanese: ラプラスの魔女, Hepburn: Rapurasu no Majo) is a 2018 Japanese mystery thriller film directed by Takashi Miike, adapted from the 2015 novel of the same name by Keigo Higashino.

== Plot ==
When two people are poisoned with hydrogen sulfide, the police call in the aid of the geochemistry professor Shusuke Aoe to solve the mystery of their deaths.

== Cast ==
- Shō Sakurai as Shusuke Aoe
- Suzu Hirose as Madoka Uhara
- Sōta Fukushi as Kento Amakasu
- Mirai Shida as Tetsu Okunishi
- Eriko Satō as Chisato Mizuki
- Tao Okamoto as Rei Kirimiya
- Rei Dan as Mina Uhara
- Masanobu Takashima as Toru Takeo
- Lily Franky as Dr. Zentaro Uhara
- Hiroshi Tamaki as Yuji Nakaoka
- Etsushi Toyokawa as Saisei Amakasu

== Production ==
Filming began on March 16, 2017, and lasted until April 2017.

== Reception ==
The film received generally negative reviews, with most reviewers pointing out the difference in quality between it and Miike's other work.

In a review for Yahoo! Lifestyle, reviewer Marcus Goh stated that the main problem with the film "is that there's no storytelling whatsoever. Each scene is made up of copious exposition dumps, with absolutely no foreshadowing or setup of what is to happen next. Things happen because the plot dictates it to be so, rather than through the effort of the characters. The mystery is solved because of a convoluted explanation that’s provided to you, with no prior indication that any of this might have been the case." He further criticizes the main actor, writing, "Sakurai's performance is bland and uninspiring, to the point that even he looks bored at the character he’s playing."

In a review for the Canadian magazine Exclaim!, reviewer Laura Di Girolamo concluded that "this is a run-of-the-mill Japanese drama thriller that could have used a bit more of that Miike edge to really make it work."

Reviewer Rob Hunter of Film School Rejects wrote that the film "is a mystery with some mildly supernatural elements, but forget suspenseful — this movie’s not even interesting."

Reviewer J Hurtado of Screen Anarchy wrote that "legendary director Miike Takashi takes a stab at the idea with his adaptation of Higoshino Keigo's novel of the same name makes an attempt that sadly falls far flat of what we've come to expect from this veteran filmmaker."

Reviewer Richard Gray of The Reel Bits called it a "slow-moving adaptation that never quite develops its multiple story threads" and concluded that "at two hours the film long overstays its welcome."

The film earned $10.9 million at the Japanese box office.
