= Miki Sato (television personality) =

Retired Japanese model, television personality, and actress

- 佐藤 美希
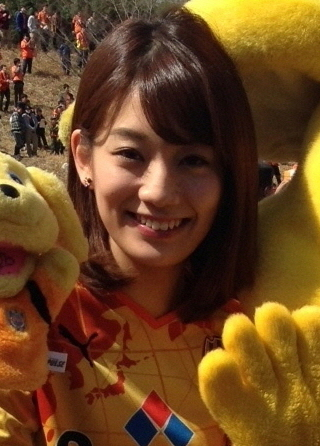
- At the IAI Stadium Nihondaira's "Battle of Shimizu S-Pulse x Kashima Antlers" (8 March 2015)
- Born: 26 June 1993 (age 33); Utsunomiya, Tochigi Prefecture, Japan
- Other name: Satomiki (Note: She was nicknamed in Nippon TV's Neri Summers. It is covered that Kazuki Ōtake only lowered the "u" sound.)
- Occupations: Model; tarento; actress
- Years active: 2013 – 2022
- Style: Fashion; gravure
- Height: 166 cm (5 ft 5 in)

Miki Sato (佐藤 美希, Satō Miki; born 26 June 1993, in Utsunomiya, Tochigi Prefecture) is a former Japanese tarento, actress and fashion model.

Sato is formerly represented with Horipro. She won the Horipro Talent Scout Caravan Grand Prix. Sato is the second generation J.League female manager. She was an exclusive model for the magazine non-no. Sato is nicknamed Satomiki (サトミキ).

== Filmography ==
=== Television ===
Year	Title	Network	Ref.
2013	Akko ni omakase!	TBS	
2014	Mezamashi TV	Fuji TV	
2014	Neri Summers	NTV	
2014	U Ji Kōji no Sanchi Chokusō! Fureai Market	Tochi Tele	
2014	VS Arashi	Fuji TV	
2015	Neri Summers Second Season	NTV	
2015	Nidaime JM	Fuji TV	
2015	J no Samurai	TV Asahi	
2016	Soccer Asia Saikyō Club Kettei-sen 2016 AFC Champions League Highlight	NTV	
2016	J.League Walker: Stadium de Sugosu Kyūjitsu wa Saikō no Omoide ni naru.	TBS	
2016	J no Sugowaza	TV Asahi	

=== Advertisements ===
Year	Title	Ref.
2014	Nagatanien "Irodori gohan"	
2015	Thermos L.L.C. "Kētai Mag"	

=== Internet ===
Year	Title	Website	Ref.
2015	J.League Joshi Mana: Miki Sato no "Daisuki! J.League"	J.League Official Site	
	Kotoshi no YJ wa Kimi no Mono: Genseki 10!!	Weekly Young Jump Official Site	
2016	F.Chan TV	Football Channel	

=== TV dramas ===
Year	Title	Role	Network	Ref.
2016	Doctor-X: Surgeon Michiko Daimon	Sakura Tojo	TV Asahi	

=== Films ===
Year	Title	Role	Ref.
2015	Shuriken Sentai Ninninger the Movie: The Dinosaur Lord's Splendid Ninja Scroll!	Ninja	

=== Stage ===
Year	Title	Role	Ref.
2016	Chīsana Kekkonshiki –Itsuka, ī Kaze wa Fuku–	Ai Natsuno	

=== Others ===
Year	Title	Ref.
2013	Radio Goodwill ambassador	
2015	J.League female manager	
2015	53rd Sendenkaigi Awards Image Girl	

== Bibliography ==
=== Magazine serialisations ===
Year	Title	Ref.
2014	non-no	
2016	Soccer Magazine Zone "Satomiki Diary"	

=== Magazines ===
Year	Title	Ref.
2015	Weekly Young Jump	
2015	Soccer Game King	
2016	Bomb	
2016	Weekly Playboy	

=== Internet serializations ===
Year	Title	Website
2016	Yakiniku yori, J.League ga Suki ni narimashita.	J.League.jp
