= Ryokiteki na Kanojo =

- Genre: Romantic comedy
- Written by: Yuji Sakamoto
- Directed by: Nobuhiro Doi
- Starring: Tsuyoshi Kusanagi; Rena Tanaka
- Opening theme: "Tsuyogari" by Kome Kome Club
- Country of origin: Japan
- Original language: Japanese
- No. of episodes: 11

Production
- Executive producer: Nobuhiro Doi
- Producer: Hidenori Iyoda
- Production location: Tokyo
- Running time: 60 min./episode

Original release
- Network: TBS
- Release: April 20, 2008 – June 2008

Related
- My Sassy Girl; My Sassy Girl (2008 film); Ugly Aur Pagli (Bollywood film); My Sassy Girl 2 (Chinese film); Maa Iddhari Madhya (Telugu film)

Ryokiteki na Kanojo (猟奇的な彼女) is a Japanese television drama based on the South Korean movie My Sassy Girl. It narrates the story between Saburo Masaki, a marine biologist, and Riko Takami, an aspiring writer with a short temper. While the two are at odds with each other at first, they eventually become attracted to each other and develop a relationship. It received an average of 8.18% viewer rating throughout the series.

== Cast ==
- Tsuyoshi Kusanagi as Saburo Masaki
- Rena Tanaka as Riko Takami
- Nao Matsushita as Minami Asakura
- Emi Suzuki as Haruka Kisaragi
- Shintaro Yamada as Moichi Goto
- Mitsuki Oishi as Wakaba Hayashida
- Yuko Chino (千野裕子) as Asami Yue
- Rie Kokubo (小久保利恵) as Yui Shimaki
- Koichi Kosse (コッセこういち) as Masashi Sone
- Yoshie Ichige as Satsuki Hayashida
- Nahomi Matsushima as Yuzuko Yutenji
- Shosuke Tanihara as Kensaku Kazushima
- Takaya Kamikawa as Keisuke Natsume
- Somegoro Ichikawa as Shunsuke Nonomura
