= Hiromi Hosoi =

- 細井 宏美
- Born: May 13, 1989 (age 37); Tokyo, Japan
- Other name: Romihi
- Occupations: Tarento, model
- Years active: 2006–
- Agent: A-Light

Hiromi Hosoi (細井 宏美, Hosoi Hiromi; born May 13, 1989, in Tokyo, Japan) is a Japanese tarento and model represented by A-Light. She is nicknamed Romihi (ろみひ).

== Biography ==
Hosoi debuted as a reader model in the magazine Egg in 2006. Her first appearance in the magazine's pin-cover was in August 2007, and gained the nickname "Romihi" from the readers. Hosoi appeared in the cover of Egg 24 times. In August 2012, she graduated and announced that she would be moved to S Cawaii!. Although a short model, Hosoi's appearance is popular among fans and readers. On December 14, 2009, she won first place in the "2010-nen no Fashion Leader wa Dare ka" of Mezamashi TV.

Hosoi is friends with Kanako Kawabata, Aya Suzuki, and Rui Kotobuki from the same agency and they have appeared together at various events.

== Filmography ==
=== TV series ===
Year	Title	Network	Notes
2006	Gal Circle	NTV	Episode 8; Guest
2009	Mezamashi TV	Fuji TV	
2010	Gentei-hin Korabonēze	Fuji TV	
2010	Aimai Na!	TBS	Quasi-regular appearances
2010	Geinōjin Dekokaji Senshuken	Fuji TV	
2010	King's Brunch	TBS	
2011	Will Together	TVK	Reporter

=== Magazines ===
Year	Title	Notes
2006	Egg	
2012	S Cawaii!	

=== Internet series ===
Title	Network	Notes
Gal Talk Tengoku	TBS	Regular appearances

=== Other ===
Title	Notes
Cocolulu	Image model
SBY	Image model
DHC "Yakuyō Deep Cleansing Oil"	Image model
Mori Kawa Cutie	Image model
