= Maya Koizumi =

- 小泉 麻耶
- Born: 2 July 1988 (age 38); Tokyo, Japan
- Other names: Maya Hayashide (林出 麻耶, Hayashide Maya; real name)
- Citizenship: Japan
- Occupations: Actress; tarento
- Years active: 2006–present
- Notable work: Megami Sentai Venus Five; Tokumei Joshi-ana: Yoko Namino; Re:Play-Girls; Kurayami kara Te o nobase
- Television: Ore no Sora: Keiji-hen
- Spouse: Unknown (m. 2024)
- Awards: Yubari International Fantastic Film Festival Off Theater Competition Category Grand Prix Cinegar Award

Maya Koizumi (小泉 麻耶, Koizumi Maya; born 2 July 1988) is a Japanese actress, tarento, and former gravure idol from Tokyo who has appeared in television series, feature films and stage productions.

== Filmography ==
=== Films ===
Date	Title	Role	Director	Distributor
2009	Megami Sentai Venus Five	Miki Sugimoto / Blue Venus	Shunsuke Yamamoto	
2009	Tokumei Joshi-ana: Yoko Namino	Announcer Takazawa		TMC
2009	Electronic Girl	Nana		Mobcast
2010	Re:Play-Girls	Rio		
2011	Ai: Aru Kanojo no Sekai Seifuku?!			SpiralRecord
2012	Bayside Shakedown The Final	Wangan Transportation Division Women's Police Officer		
23 Mar 2013	Kurayami kara Te o nobase	Saori		

=== Direct-to-video ===
Date	Title	Publisher	Notes
26 Jan 2011	Re:play-Girls: Rio no Monogatari: Reason Of Myself	Grasso	Making DVD

=== Television ===
Dates	Title	Network	Notes
26 Jul 2007	Natsu no Osusume Special: Jin Shirosaki no Josei o Iyasu Tabi	TX	Guam location programme
	NNN News Real Time	NTV	
	FNN Super News	CX	
	Idol no Ana: Bi Nittelegenic o Sagase!	NTV	
	Nittelegenic no Ana	NTV	
	Masahiro Nakai no Black Variety	NTV	
	Zero×Senkyo	NTV	Appeared in "Next! Generation"
	Surprise	NTV	
	Tokyo Hit Girl	NTV	
	Shin Saikyō Medal Densetsu	Sun TV	
	Wake ari Bungee	Sun TV	
	Slow Life TV Gen Slocal	TCN Tokochan	
16 Dec 2014	Tonari no Shimura	NHK	
Feb, Mar 2016	Anata to iku Sake to Onsen Futaritabi	V Paradise	#9 Yahiko Onsen-hen, #11 Teradomari Onsen-hen

=== TV dramas ===
Dates	Title	Role	Network	Episode
4 Dec 2011	Ore no Sora: Keiji-hen	Azusa Takano	EX	7
20 Apr 2013	Doyō Wide Gekijō Another Face: Keiji Sōmu-ka Tetsu Otomo 2	Nurse	ABC	
12 May 2013	Soratobu Kōhō-shitsu	Kazumi Nakashima	TBS	5
3–28 Jun 2013	Hakui no Namida	Shiori Mikami	THK	3 "Mission"
11 Oct – 22 Nov 2013	Toshi Densetsu no Onna: Part 2	Yuki Tamura	EX	
19 Apr – 12 Jul 2014	Reverse Edge: Ōkawabata Tanteisha	Megumi	TX	
11 Nov 2014	Sutekina-sen Taxi	Erika Natsukawa	KTV	5
11 Apr 2016	Love Song		CX	1
5 May 2016	Keishichō Sōsaikka 9 Kakari	Riona Kitajima	EX	Season 11 Episode 5
21 Jan 2017	Gin to Kin		TX	Episode 3
15 May 2017	Keishichō Minamidaira Han: Shichinin no Keiji 10	Ayane Kubo	TBS	

=== Radio ===
Title	Networks
Hideaki Ota-Maya Koizumi no Asobukokoro Club	NCB, Tokai Radio
Takami kokoro no Kiken na Imōto(-tachi)	FM Osaka

=== Stage ===
Dates	Title	Role	Location	Notes	Ref.
15–19 Apr 2009	WitPresents Ikkan Produce Theater Mayonaka no File		Sun Mall Studio		
25 Jun 2011	Vampire Hunter	Federita	Sasazuka Factory		
23–26 Aug 2012	W-Speak third performance Shōgeki Summer "By the End of Fireworks", "Sea House"		Ikebukuro Theater Kassai		
22–27 Nov 2012	Mitsuboshi Kitchen FaMiLY		CBGK Shibugeki!!		
26–30 Dec 2012	W-Speak fourth performance Shōgeki Lovers "Selfish God", "Kiss Came Back"		Ikebukuro Theater Kassai		
29 Mar – 1 Apr 2013	Nelke Planning Dove, Giwagiwa no Onna-tachi		AiiA 2.5 Theater Tokyo		
8–9 Aug 2015	Two person play & solo live The Meaning of...		Kagurazaka The Glee	Koizumi's performance was on 9 August; directed by Satoshi Watanabe	
8–11 Sep 2016	mile up presence Maya Koizumi 10th anniversary!! Senaka o Misete	Koume Kisaragi	Dining cafe theater		

=== Advertisements ===
Year	Product
2008	Suntory "Boss Luxurious sugar"
2010	Morinaga Seika "Koeda"

== Released works ==
=== Photo albums ===
Date	Title	Publisher	Photographer	ISBN
25 Jul 2006	Geneki Mesukōsei	Ayanbokan Publishing	Seiichi Nomura	ISBN 978-4-7756-0136-5
21 Nov 2007	Kokoro moyō	Wani Books	Seiichi Nomura	ISBN 978-4-8470-4052-8
Jun 2008	Gekkan Maya Koizumi (Shincho Mook 103)	Shinchosha	Hajime Sawatari	ISBN 978-4-10-790187-3
11 Mar 2011	Gekkan Neo Maya Koizumi	E-Net Frontier	Koichiro Matsui	ISBN 9784862058324

=== DVD ===
Date	Title	Publisher	ISBN
15 Dec 2006	Maya No Kimochi	E-Net Frontier	
16 Mar 2007	Kimi no tonari de	E-Net Frontier	
8 Jun 2007	Pure Smile	Takeshobo	
28 Sep 2007	Vitamin M	Geneon Entertainment	
25 Jan 2008	Kokoro no Prism	Wani Books	
28 Jan 2009	Gekkan Maya Koizumi	E-Net Frontier	
26 Sep 2009	Nittelegenic 2009	VAP	
18 Dec 2009	Hussle!	Advance Agency	
27 Aug 2010	Maya no Chikai	Ayanbokan Publishing	
19 Nov 2010	Real	Takeshobo	ISBN 9784812444030
23 Feb 2011	Love game	Sony Music Distribution	
20 Jun 2011	Mitsu Rakuen	Line Communications	
20 Jun 2011	Kinkyori Renai	Line Communications	
