= Harumi Tsuyuzaki =

Japanese singer and songwriter

Harumi Tsuyuzaki (露崎春女, aka Lyrico; born April 11, 1974, in Kawasaki, Kanagawa, Japan) is a female Japanese pop, R&B, and soul singer-songwriter. She debuted in 1995 with her single "Time". She changed her name to Lyrico in 2001, but then changed it back in 2008.

== Discography ==
=== Singles ===
- "Time" (Oct 25, 1995)
- "Need You Badly" (Feb 25, 1996)
- "Feel You" (Sep 5, 1996)
- "Forever In Your Heart" (Feb 5, 1997)
- "Taiyou" (May 21, 1997)
- "Wish" (Nov 6, 1997)
- "Feel So Real" (Jul 23, 1998)
- "Believe Yourself" (Oct 21, 1998)
- "Break On Out" (Nov 26, 1999)
- "Snow" (Jan 26, 2000)
- "Jyounetsu No Taiyou" (Dec 6, 2000)
- "Prayer" (Feb 7, 2001)
- "Tears In Christmas" (Nov 21, 2001)
- "True Romance" (Jan 23, 2002)
- "Eternity" (May 22, 2002)
- "Kiseki No Hana" (Sep 19, 2002)
- "Lost Wing" (Nov 19, 2003)
- "Ageha" (Jul 7, 2004)
- "The Song of Life -Hikari no Uta-" w/Yuji Toriyama (Jan 18, 2006)
- "Sacrifice" (Feb 16, 2011)
- "Alright" (Apr 20, 2011)
- "Tribute live '100% Whitney'" (May 23, 2012)
- "Agape" (Oct 30, 2013)

=== Albums ===
- Harumi Tsuyuzaki (Nov 25, 1995)
- Wonder Of Dream (Sep 5, 1996)
- Wonder Of Love (Feb 17, 1997)
- Thank You! (Aug 6, 1997)
- Believe Yourself (Aug 26, 1998)
- Especial Best Of 1995-1998 (Mar 17, 1999)
- Groove Remixes (Jun 18, 1999)
- Ballads (Dec 1, 1999)
- As I Am (Jan 26, 2000)
- Tender Lights (Feb 20, 2002)
- Voices of Grace (Nov 20, 2002)
- Flavours (May 12, 2004)
- Golden Best (Jan 26, 2005)
- 13years (Oct 22, 2008)
- Now Playing (Apr 20, 2011)
- Respect (Jul 18, 2012)
- Love Naturally (Dec 11, 2013)
- One Voice (Apr 15, 2015)
- One Voice II 24bit/96kHz (Jul 13, 2016)
- One Voice II (Jul 13, 2016)
- Special Gift (Jan 30, 2019)
- Funky Flag (Mar 13, 2019)

== See also ==
- An Music School
