= Tsubasa Honda =

Japanese actress and model (born 1992)

- 本田 翼
- Honda in September 2026
- Born: June 27, 1992 (age 34); Tokyo, Japan
- Other names: Bassa (ばっさー); /baQ.saː/
- Occupations: Actress; model
- Years active: 2006–present
- Agent: Stardust Promotion
- Known for: GTO; Ao Haru Ride; Koinaka
- Height: 1.66 m (5 ft 5 1/2 in)

Tsubasa Honda (本田 翼, Honda Tsubasa; born June 27, 1992) is a Japanese actress and model.

== Career ==
Honda at the 28th Tokyo International Film Festival in 2015

In mid-2006, Honda entered the entertainment industry after being scouted by seven different people on the same day. She then debuted as an exclusive model for the magazine Seventeen in the same year. In 2007, she switched magazines, being an exclusive model for Love Berry. From January 2010 onwards, she switched again to Non-no.

Honda at the 30th Tokyo International Film Festival in 2017

From April 2012 to May 2013, she was the assistant of the TBS talk show A-Studio hosted by Shōfukutei Tsurube II. In November 2012, she made her film debut by starring in the film Fashion Story: Model. In July 2013, she appeared as an MC on the late-night music show Music Dragon aired on NTV. She played the heroine in the Fuji TV getsuku drama Koinaka in July 2015.

== Filmography ==
=== TV dramas ===
- Shima Shima Episode 5 (TBS, 2011), high school girl
- Celeb Party ni Ikō (BS-TBS, 2011), Tsubasa
- Renai Neet: Wasureta Koi no Hajimekata (TBS, 2012), Yui Kinoshita
- Strawberry Night Episode 3 (Fuji TV, 2012), high school girl
- Papadol Episode 2 (TBS, 2012), herself
- Kagi no Kakatta Heya Episode 10 and 11 (Fuji TV, 2012), Shinobu Kawamura
- My Daddy Is an Idol! Episode 2 (TBS, 2012), A-Studio TV show presenter
- GTO (KTV, 2012), Urumi Kanzaki
- Aki mo Oni Abare Special (2012)
- Piece (NTV, 2012), Mizuho Suga
- Shōgatsu Special! Fuyuyasumi mo Nekketsu Jugyō da (2013)
- Kanketsu-hen: Saraba Onizuka! Sotsugyō Special (2013)
- Tonbi (TBS, 2013), Kyō Matsumoto
- Vampire Heaven (TV Tokyo, 2013), Komachi
- Power Office Girls 2013 (Fuji TV, 2013), Shiori Maruyama
- Andō Lloyd: A.I. knows Love? (TBS, 2013), Sapuri
- Saikō no Omotenashi (NTV, 2014), Nana Momokawa
- Henshin (Wowow, 2014), Ryōko Kyōgoku
- Tokyo ni Olympic o Yonda Otoko (Fuji TV, 2014), Nina
- Kōhaku ga Umareta Hi (NHK, 2015), Mitsue Takeshita
- Yamegoku: Helpline Cop (TBS, 2015), Haruka Nagamitsu
- Koinaka (Fuji TV, 2015), Akari Serizawa
- Pretty Proofreader (NTV, 2016), Toyoko Morio
- Super Salaryman Mr. Saenai (NTV, 2017)
- Swimming in the Dark (TBS, 2017), Azusa Hada
- Chūnen Superman Saenai Si Episode 5 (NTV, 2017), Fujisaki
- Caution, Hazardous Wife (NTV, 2017), Kyoko Sato
- Absolute Zero 3 (Fuji TV, 2018), Yui Odagiri
- Yuube wa Otanoshimi Deshita ne (TBS, MBS, 2019), Miyako Okamoto
- Radiation House (Fuji TV, 2019–2021), Anne Amakasu
- Secret × Warrior Phantomirage! (TV Tokyo, 2019), Kumachi
- Trap the Con Man (NTV, YTV, 2019), Saki Hoshino / Momo Kisaragi
- Absolute Zero 4 (Fuji TV, 2020), Yui Odagiri
- Bullets, Bones and Blocked Noses (NHK, 2021), Yukina Kakizaki
- I Will Be Your Bloom (TBS, 2022), Asuka Nakamachi

=== Films ===
- Fashion Story: Model (2012), Hinako
- Rakugo Eiga "Life Rate" (2013)
- Enoshima Prism (2013), Michiru Andō
- It All Began When I Met You (2013), Natsumi Ōtomo in "Christmas no Yūki"
- Nishino Yukihiko no Koi to Bōken (2014), Kanoko
- Blue Spring Ride (2014), Futaba Yoshioka
- Terminal (2015), Atsuko Shīna
- Night's Tightrope (2016), Yuki Sakurai
- The Mole Song: Hong Kong Capriccio (2016), Karen
- Fullmetal Alchemist (2017), Winry Rockbell
- Color Me True (2018), Tōko Naruse
- Aircraft Carrier Ibuki (2019)
- The Journalist (2019)
- Weathering with You (2019), Natsumi (voice)
- Tom and Sawyer in the City (2021), Reia Washio
- Radiation House: The Movie (2022), Anne Amakasu
- Fullmetal Alchemist: The Revenge of Scar (2022), Winry Rockbell
- Fullmetal Alchemist: The Final Alchemy (2022), Winry Rockbell
- Gosh!! (2025)

=== Web dramas ===
- Shinikare (NOTTV, 2012), Marika
- Gozen 3-ji no Muhōchitai (BeeTV, 2013), Momoko Nanase
- Chase (Amazon Video, 2017), Mai Aizawa
- Chase 2 (Amazon Prime, 2018), Mai Aizawa

=== Dubbing ===
- Taka no Tsume 7: Jōō Heika no Jōbūbu (2014), Mutsumi Kihara

=== Commercials ===
- Sony Computer Entertainment - PlayStation 3 (2006)
- Baskin Robbins - Satiwan Ice Cream (2007)
- KDDI - au 1seg (2007)
- Odakyu Electric Railway (2008)
- Toyota - Toyota Sai (2009)
- Dydo Drinco - Dydo Blend Coffee (2011–2012)
- NOTTV (2012)
- East Japan Railway Company
  - TYO Thank You 25 Campaign (2012–2013)
  - JR Ski Ski (2012)
- Mark Styler Runway Channel (2012–2013)
- Ichikura Ondine (2012)
- Hoya Healthcare - Eye City (2012–2013)
- Honda
  - Kurumatching (2012)
  - Sensing (2015)
- Pitat House Network (2012-)
- Japan Construction Occupational Safety and Health Association (2012–2013)
- Kyocera - Honey Bee (2012–2013)
- House Wellness Foods - C1000 (2013-)
- Bourbon - Fettuccine Gummy (2013)
- Kao
  - Biore Sarasara Powder Sheet (2013-)
  - Cape (2013)
  - Marshmallow Whip (2014-)
- Nintendo - Mario & Luigi: Dream Team (2013)
- Aflac - Chanto Kotaeru Medical Insurance Ever/Ladies' Ever (2013)
- Kanebo Cosmetics - Lavshuca (2013)
- Yahoo Japan (2014)
- Nikon
  - Nikon 1 J4 (2014)
  - Nikon Coolpix S6900 (2014)
  - Nikon 1 J5 (2015)
- ABC Mart
  - Puma×ABC Mart Campaign Special Movie "Everyday is Special" (2014)
  - Converse (2014)
  - Nuovo Cool White Sandal (2015)
- Recruit - Trabāyu (2014)
- Gloops - Skylock (2014)
- Asahi Breweries - Clear Asahi (2015)
- Square Enix - Hoshi no Dragon Quest

=== Music videos ===
- B'z - Eien no Tsubasa (May 9, 2007)
- Base Ball Bear
  - Short Hair (August 31, 2011)
  - Perfect Blue (February 13, 2013)
- JaaBourBonz - Chikau yo (December 14, 2011)
- Ms.Oooja - Be... (February 29, 2012)
- Ikimono-gakari - Kirari (December 24, 2014)

=== Radio ===
- School of Lock! (Tokyo FM, December 9, 2014)

== Bibliography ==
=== Magazines ===
- Seventeen, Shueisha 1967-, as an exclusive model from 2006
- Love Berry, Tokuma Shoten 2001–2012, as an exclusive model from January 2007 to 2008
- Jille, Futabasha 2001–2014, September 2008 to December 2009
- Non-no, Shueisha 1971-, as an exclusive model from January 2010
- Myōjō, Shueisha 1952-, December 2012-
- Men's Non-No, Shueisha 1986-, April 2015-

=== Photobooks ===
- Hondarake Hondabon (October 13, 2013), SDP, ISBN 978-4906953066
