= Rena Takeda =

Japanese actress and model

- 武田 玲奈
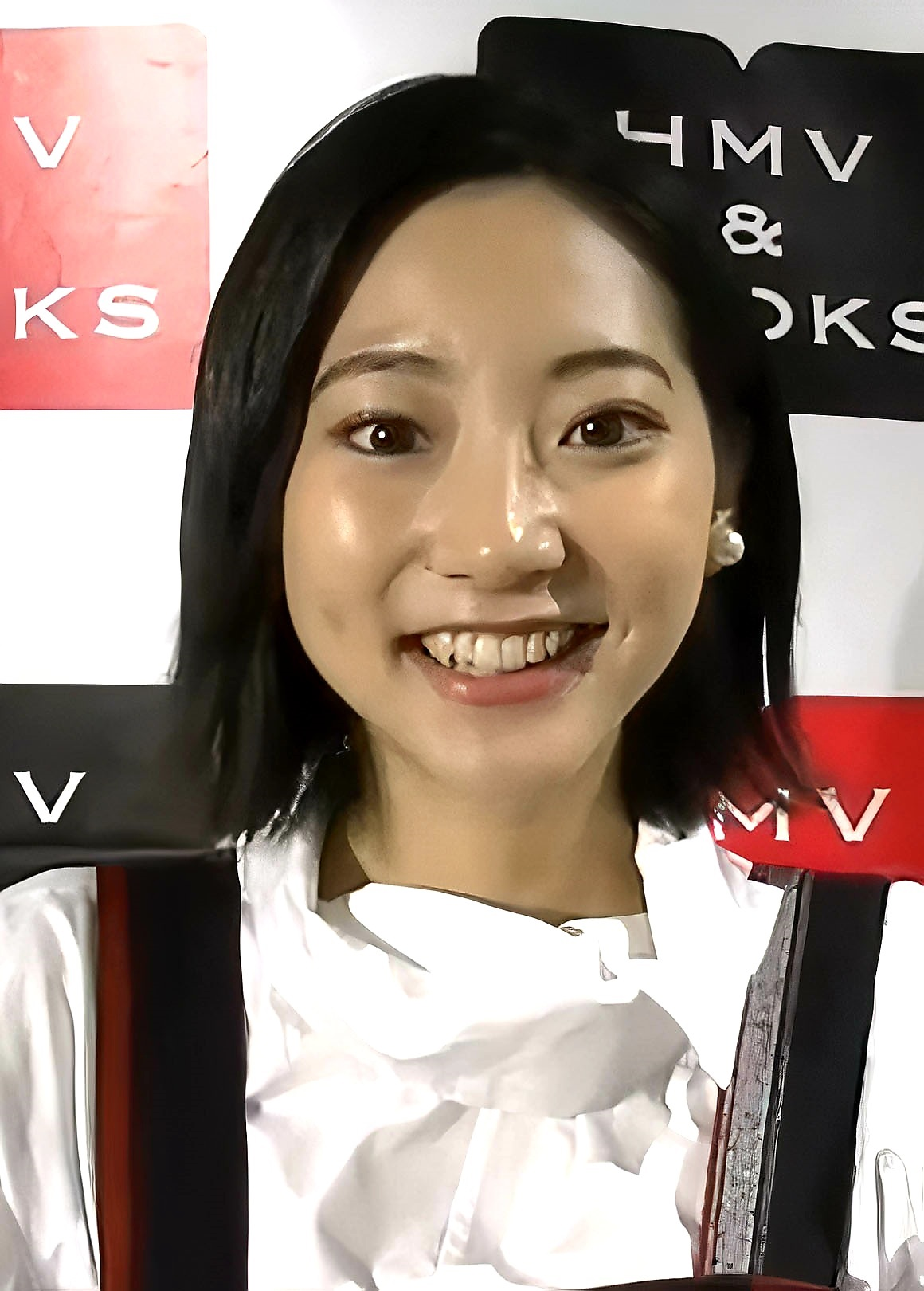
- Rena Takeda in 2020
- Born: July 27, 1997 (age 29); Iwaki, Fukushima, Japan
- Occupations: Model; Actress
- Years active: 2013–present
- Agents: Vithmic Co., Ltd.; TRUSTAR
- Spouse: Unknown (m. 2026)
- Website: takeda-rena.com

Rena Takeda (武田 玲奈, Takeda Rena; born July 27, 1997), nicknamed Renarena (れなれな), is a Japanese actress and model affiliated with Vithmic Co., Ltd.

== Biography ==
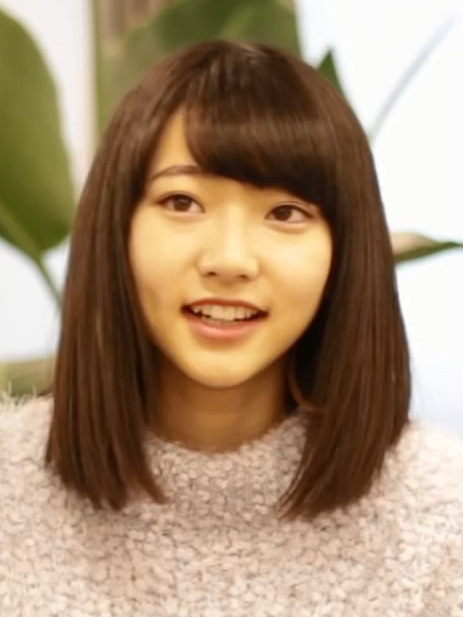
Rena Takeda in 2017

Rena Takeda was born in Iwaki, Fukushima in 1997. In December 2013 she won a competition named "Seeking a second Kumicky" from among the 2,020 applicants. She was an exclusive model for Popteen from February 2014 to April 2016. She has been the exclusive model of Non-no since the June 2016 issue. Her debut film in 2015 was Prison School, where she played one of the main cast.

On September 3, 2026, she announced her marriage to a general man.

== Filmography ==
=== Films ===
Year	Title	Role	Director	Other notes	Ref.
2015	Chicken's Dynamite		Toshimitsu Iizuka		
2015	Assassination Classroom	Yuzuki Fuwa	Eiichirō Hasumi	Debut role	
2015	The Edge of Sin	Chiaki Kimura	Yūkichi Ōtsuka		
2015	Halloween Nightmare 2	Nanami			
2016	Assassination Classroom: Graduation	Yuzuki Fuwa	Eiichirō Hasumi		
2016	The Stare	Nami Miyazawa			
2016	Wolf Girl and Black Prince	Mayu Nanase	Ryūichi Hiroki		
2016	Kiri: Shokugyô Koroshiya				
2016	Mynavi presents TOKYO CITY GIRL 2016 (Local Tokyo)				
2017	Saki	Kana Ikeda	Yūichi Onuma		
2017	Kōsai Kinenbi	Saya		Lead role	
2017	Poetry Angel	Anne Maruyama		Lead role	
2017	Last Cop the Movie	Misaki Osanai			
2017	Papa no Obentō wa Sekaiichi	Midori		Lead role	
2018	Werewolf Game: Inferno	Hiromi Nonoyama		Lead role	
2018	Kamen Rider Amazons the Movie: The Last Judgement	Mizuki Mizusawa	Hidenori Ishida		
2020	Oishi Kyushoku Final Battle	Hitomi Misono			
2020	Dance to Mita	Manabe	Toshimitsu Iizuka		
2020	The Samejima Incident	Nana Sasaki	Jirō Nagae	Lead role	
2023	Six Singing Women		Yoshimasa Ishibashi		
2024	Oi Handsome!!	Mika	Masatoshi Yamaguchi		

=== TV series ===
Year	Title	Role	Network	Other notes	Ref.
2015	High School Chorus	Ayaka Shinozaki	TBS	Guest role	
2015	Prison School	Chiyo Kurihara	MBS, TBS		
2016	Kasa o Motanai Aritachi wa	Mai Akatsu (young)	Fuji TV		
2016	Kamen Rider Amazons	Mizuki Mizusawa	BS Asahi, Tokyo MX		
2016	Love Song	Momoka Sakamoto	Fuji TV	Guest role	
2016	A Girl & Three Sweethearts	Rena	Fuji TV	Guest role, Episode 3	
2016	The Last Cop 2	Misaki Osanai	NTV		
2016	Saki	Kana Ikeda	TBS		
2017	Kamen Rider Amazons 2	Mizuki Mizusawa	BS Asahi, Tokyo MX		
2017	Million Yen Women	Midori Suzumura	TV Tokyo		
2017	Maji de Kōkai Shitemasu	Tsubame Ishikawa	MBS, TBS	Lead role	
2017	Hitoshi Ueki and His Pupil	Miyoko Kamata	NHK		
2017	Kondera Tarō	Nomi Shiratori	NHK		
2017	What Is Your Perfect Way To Eat Fried Eggs?	Aki	MBS, TBS		
2018	Werewolf Game: Lost Eden	Hiromi Nonoyama	tvk	Lead role	
2018	Naruto Hitchō	Yone	NHK	Guest role	
2018	Yareta Kamo Iinkai	Hiromi Kawakami	MBS, TBS, dTV		
2018	Maji de Kōkai Shitemasu 2	Tsubame Ishikawa	MBS, TBS	Lead role	
2018	Way too Kawaii	Kokone Nakagawa	NTV, Hulu		
2019	The New King	Eiri Mitsui	TBS, Paravi		
2019	The New King Season 2	Eiri Mitsui	TBS, Paravi		
2019	Tokusatsu GaGaGa	Yuki Shirahama	NHK		
2019	Denei Shojo: Video Girl Mai 2019	Yuna Asakawa	TV Tokyo		
2019	Noble Boys	Fumino Ono	Tokyo MX		
2019	School Meals Time	Hitomi Misono	Tokyo MX		
2020	Keishichou Sousa Ikkachou	Yukiko Ashida	TV Asahi	Guest role, Episode 2	
2020	Gourmet Detective Goro Akechi	Coco	NTV		
2020	Isekai Izakaya "Nobu" Season 1	Shinobu Senke	WOWOW		
2020	Sixteen Shōkōgun	Mei Odazawa	Fuji TV		
2020	Doctor Hikojiro 5	Mika Matsunaga	TV Asahi		
2021	Gekikaradou	Kasumi	TV Tokyo, Paravi	Guest role, Episode 7	
2021	A Man and His Cat	Momiji Sato	TV Tokyo, Paravi		
2021	Rider Time: Kamen Rider Decade VS Zi-O	Misa Kudo	TELASA		
2021	Rider Time: Kamen Rider Zi-O VS Decade	Misa Kudo	TELASA		
2021	Seiyuu Tantei	Kaoru Toda	TV Tokyo		
2021	Yo nimo Kimyouna Kimi Monogatari	Sayuri Watanabe	WOWOW		
2021	Rikokatsu	Yumi Nakatani	TBS	Episode 1	
2021	Jimoto ni Kaerenai Wakeari Danshi no 14 no Jijo	Anna	TV Asahi		
2021	Hachigatsu wa Yoru no Batting Centre de	Karin Imai	TV Tokyo	Guest role, Episode 3	
2021	Mushoboke	Lisa	TV Asahi		
2021	Doctor Y - Surgeon Hideki Kaji	Sanae Egashira	TV Asahi		
2022	Hey Handsome!	Mika Ito	Tokai TV, Fuji TV		
2022	Isekai Izakaya "Nobu" Season 2	Shinobu Senke	WOWOW		
2023	Isekai Izakaya "Nobu" Season 3	Shinobu Senke	WOWOW		
2024	Anata no Koibito, Gōdatsushimasu	Hinako Minami	ABC TV, TV Asahi, other ANN affiliates	Lead role	
2024	Minami-kun ga Koibito!?	Misuzu Sagawa	TV Asahi		

=== Anime ===
Year	Title	Role	Network	Other notes	Ref.
2016	One Piece Film: Gold	Lepre		Side role	
2019	Business Fish	Mai Otohime	Tokyo MX, BS11, Hulu		

=== Video games ===
Year	Title	Role	Platform	Ref.
2019	For Whom the Alchemists Exists	Lena	Mobile game	

=== Variety Shows ===
- Mezamashi TV: (2015-2016)

=== Commercials ===
- Pocky: 2016

== Bibliography ==
=== Magazines ===
- Popteen, Haruki Kadokawa Corporation 1980-, as an exclusive model from February 2014 to April 2016
- Nylon Japan
- Non-no, Shueisha 1971-, as an exclusive model since June 2016
- Men's Non-No
- Fine Boys
- Men's Joker
- Street Jack
- Samurai ELO (Sanae Shobo)
- CHOKi CHOKi
- BLT (October 24, 2016 - Tokyo News Service) - December 2016 issue "Tavillena"
- Weekly Young Jump (Shueisha)
  - 2015 No. 13 February 26 extra large issue, No. 20 April 16 release issue, No. 25, No. 30, No. 41
  - 2016 No. 6-7 merger issue, no. 18, no. 37-38 merger issue
  - 2018 No. 36-37 merger issue
  - 2019 No. 11 appearance with Sarii Ikegami
- Weekly Shōnen Sunday (August 12, 2015; October 28, 2015, Shogakugan) No. 35 and 46 2016 - Both covers
- Weekly Shōnen Magazine (Kodansha)
  - September 16, 2015, No. 42; September 5, 2018, No. 40; 2019 No. 1 - December 5, 2018
  - March 6, 2019, No.14; November 20, 2019, No. 51
- Soccer Game King (April 24, 2015, From One) - June 2015 cover
- Weekly Playboy (October 5, 2015, Shueisha) - October 19, 2015, Issue No. 43

=== Photo Album ===
- Twintail to Kikanjū (March 7, 2014, Famima Dot Com) ISBN 9784907292171
- Carp Girl (August 29, 2014, MyNavi) ISBN 9784839953133
- Short (March 31, 2016, Shueisha) ISBN 9784087807837
