= Non-no =

Japanese fashion magazine

- March 2018 cover with Tsubasa Honda and Kentaro Sakaguchi
- Categories: Fashion
- Frequency: Monthly
- Circulation: 1,239,335 (2014)
- Publisher: Shueisha
- First issue: February 1971
- Country: Japan
- Based in: Tokyo
- Language: Japanese
- Website: nonno.hpplus.jp

Non-no (ノンノ, non-no) is a Japanese women's fashion and lifestyle magazine published by Shueisha. The magazine is headquartered in Tokyo.

Men's Non-no, targeted for a male demographic, was first published in 1987.

== History ==
The magazine was established as a fortnightly in 1971. The first issue appeared in February 1971. Its title derives from the Ainu word for "flower." Like CanCam, non-no has a comparatively longer history than other Japanese fashion magazines e.g. Cawaii!, Olive, and so forth. The magazine targets teens and young women in their early 20s.

Instead of focusing on gossip, Non-no and another women's magazine, An An, provide their readers with materials with the aim of developing their self-identity.

On 25 May 1987 Shueisha launched the magazine's male counterpart, Men's Non-no.

In 1978 the circulation of Non-no was 850,000 copies. In year 2006, the magazine sold 440,870 copies.

== Exclusive models ==
=== Current ===
As of August 2026:

- Sakura Endō (2020–present)
- Mayuu Yokota (2020–present)
- Ayaka Konno (2021–present)
- Kanon (2022–present)
- Rinka Kumada
- Natsuki Deguchi (2022–present)
- Meari Hayashi
- Rina Komiyama
- Nagi Inoue
- Hina Kikuchi
- Nazuna Murakami
- Wakana Sato
- Nao Kosaka
- Shiori Kato
- Mizuki Yoshida

=== Former ===
- Airi Tanaka
- Akiko Kikuchi
- Anne Watanabe
- Ayumi
- Azusa Takehana
- Emi
- Etsuko Sugai
- Hana
- Hana Matsushima
- Izumi Yamaguchi
- Keiko Kurihara
- Lina Ohta
- Manami Teruya
- Michi Ōmori
- Miki
- Momoko Nagano
- Nishida Naomi
- Noriko Amakasu
- Satsuki Katayama
- Shiho
- Yasue Sato
- Yuko Gomiyo
- Sachie Futamura
- Mina Sayado
- Yasuko Matsuyuki (1990s)
- Yui Natsukawa (1990s)
- Ryō (1990s)
- Sachiko Katō (1990s)
- Koyuki (1990s)
- Kimiko Mori (1999–2001)
- Miho Tanaka (2000–2012)
- Ema Fujisawa (2001–2005)
- Sachiko Ogata (2002–2005)
- Rena Takeshita (2004–2009)
- Miyu Kogawa (2004–2010)
- Momoko Kuroki (2005–2007)
- Mew Azama (2006–2007)
- Miyu (2006–2010)
- Saori Watanabe (2007–2010)
- Emi Takahashi (2007–2011)
- Mikiko Yano (2008–2012)
- Cecil Kishimoto (2008–2015)
- Yumi Yamamoto 2009–2010)
- Moeka Nozaki 2009–2012)
- Nanao (2010–2011)
- Naoko Akatani (2010–2012)
- Shiori Sato (2010–2012)
- Nanaka (2010–2012)
- Nozomi Sasaki (2010–2013)
- Arisa Sato (2010–2014)
- Tsubasa Honda (2010–2018)
- Arisa Nishida (2011–2013)
- Noa Iwamoto (2011–2013)
- Nagisa Ōshima (2011–2013)
- Erena Mizusawa (2011–2013)
- Kyoko Hinami (2011–2013)
- Aya Ōmasa (2011–2016)
- Mao Ueda (2011–2016)
- Mio Uema (2012–2013)
- Saori Seto (2012–2014)
- Moe Arai (2012–2014)
- Azusa Mine (2012–2014)
- Mirei Kiritani (2012–2015)
- Haru (2012–2015)
- Sayaka Okada (2012–2018)
- Azusa Okamoto (2012–2018)
- Honoka Miki (2013–2014)
- Sachie Futamura (2013–2015)
- Seika Taketomi (2013–2016)
- Hinako Kinoshita (2013–2017)
- Miki Sato (2014–2016)
- Kang Ji-young (2014–2016)
- Akiko Kuji (2014–2017)
- Nina Endō (2014–2018)
- Mina Sayado (2015–2018)
- Anri Okamoto (2015–2018)
- Yuuna Suzuki (2014–2019)
- Haru Izumi (2013–2019)
- Riho Takada (2014–2019)
- Eri Satō (2016–2019)
- Raimu Taya (2018–2020)
- Mana Kinjō (2016–2020)
- Rena Takeda (2016–2021)
- Yua Shinkawa (2015–2021)
- Yuko Araki (2014–2021)
- Nanase Nishino (2015-2022)
- Yūka Suzuki (2014–)
- Fumika Baba (2015–)
- Nanaka Matsukawa (2017–)
- Risa Watanabe (2017–)
- Manami Enosawa (2018–)
- Asuka Kijima (2018–)
- Mirei Sasaki (2019–2025)
