= Enoshima Prism =

- Film poster
- Directed by: Yasuhiro Yoshida
- Written by: Yasuhiro Yoshida; Hirotoshi Kobayashi
- Produced by: Toshinori Yamaguchi; Kazushi Miki; Junko Takemura; Hisaaki Tai; Norikazu Kumagai
- Starring: Sota Fukushi; Shūhei Nomura; Tsubasa Honda
- Cinematography: Yōichi Chiashi
- Edited by: Taka Wada
- Music by: Shunsuke Kida
- Production companies: Geneon Universal Entertainment; Video Planning; Video Focus; Wako; TVK
- Distributed by: Video Planning
- Release date: August 10, 2013
- Running time: 90 minutes
- Country: Japan
- Language: Japanese

Enoshima Prism (江ノ島プリズム) is a 2013 Japanese film directed by Yasuhiro Yoshida.

== Plot ==
Shuta Jogasaki has been friends with Saku Kijima and Michiru Ando since childhood. As children, Michiru and Shuta, who carried Saku because he has a weak heart, climbed to the top of a hill and, saw a rainbow there together. Years later Michiru decides to go to England to study but she can't bring herself to tell them face-to-face. She only tells Saku, and only in a sealed letter she asks Shuta to give him the day she's leaving, December 21, 2010. On the way to deliver the letter Shuta's bike breaks down so he asks to borrow Saku's bike to get to a basketball game. Saku dies while running at top speed from his house to get to the station to see Michiru off. Shuta feels responsible for the death. After that Shuta and Michiru drift apart and lose contact. Two years later, December 20, 2012, Shuta attends Saku's death anniversary. He is invited to take a memento and he picks Saku's "You're a Time Traveler" watch, supposedly capable of rewinding time. Shuta takes a train home while wearing the watch and is surprised to find he has returned in time to December 20, 2010, the day before Saku's death.

Michiru calls Shuta and Saku to clean the school (it's a custom in Japan for children to clean the school). To please Michiru, Shuta agrees to put up prisms in the lab's windows to create a rainbow effect. A passing basketball team member, annoyed that Shuta didn't come to practice with the team, hits him with a ball and Shuta is suddenly sent back to the morning of December 20, 2012. He gets to the school to meet with Professor. Matsudo, his eccentric former science teacher, and discovers that the future has been altered slightly, because Matsudo now remembers the prisms in the window.

On the third time he goes back in time, Shuta goes again to the school and sees a shamanistic ritual through a window that is supposed to summon Kyoko, the spirit of a girl who committed suicide there. The science teacher startles him when she comes through a door unexpectedly, dressed for the ritual. The shock sends him to the morning of December 20, 2012 again. He repeats the routine for that 2012 morning, then, after traveling back 2 years as usual, runs to the school and claims he doesn't know how he disappeared from Saku's and Michiru's presence. The science teacher hypnotizes him to try to get his memory back and he seeks Kyoko. He learns that Kyoko is not dead but has been a "time prisoner" since World War II and can only be seen by willing time-travellers. Kyoko warns Shuta time is a law of nature and messing with it could make the future worse rather than better. However, she agrees to help him by showing him the "Jack Fin" technique: change as little of the past and do nothing dramatically different. That evening in 2010 he tries to entice Michiru confess her plans to leave for England the next day but she resists.

At midnight Shuta discovers that, as the day passes from December 20 to 21, he returns to the year 2012. He find that Saku's mother has taken an overdose of pills and collapsed at her home and realizes what Kyoko's had meant. Then he finds that Kyoko has taken the watch and she begs him not to interfere with time again. She warns him that if he does, everyone's memories of him, including his, will be completely erased. He will end up like her: invisible to everyone and forgotten. Despite this, Shuta chooses to sacrifice himself to save Saku, so Kyoko gives the watch to him.

Going back in time for the fourth time, Shuta is thrown into the afternoon of December 21, 2010, right before his basketball match. The version we see coming to the court is the Shuta from that time. We can tell because he's not wearing the watch and because getting hit with a basketball doesn't shock him into the future. The one from 2012 quizzes the "historic" Shuta to make certain Michiru's letter was delivered. 2012 Shuta then races towards the train station with Saku on his bike and is able to meet with Michiru. There, Shuta reads Michiru's letter and is surprised to learn that Michiru does not love Saku, as he previously thought, but him. Shuta was able to save Saku's life, but everyone's memories of Shuta, except Kyoko's, are erased. She can't leave the school, but she promises herself never to forget him.

Years later, Shuta is shown at the beach picking a prism of quartz. Saku and Michiru are passing by, hand in hand, and Michiru says it's very pretty. He gives the prism to Michiru, who thanks him and they part ways, complete strangers.

== Cast ==
- Sota Fukushi as Shūta Jōgasaki
- Shūhei Nomura as Saku Kijima, Shūta's childhood friend
- Tsubasa Honda as Michiru Andō, Shūta's childhood friend
- Honoka Miki as Kyōko, a high school girl ghost
- Yō Yoshida as Matsudo, a science teacher
- Mariko Akama as Yoshie Kijima, Saku's mother
- Naomi Nishida as Hitomi Jōgasaki, Shūta's mother
