= Cecil Kishimoto =

Japanese model (born 1990)

- 岸本 セシル
- Born: Seishika Kishimoto; 22 February 1990 (age 35); Okinawa Prefecture, Japan
- Other names: Rū; Rūrū
- Occupation: Model
- Years active: 2007–present
- Agent: Name Management
- Spouse: Unknown (m. 2018)
- Children: 1
- Website: name-mgt.co.jp

Seishika Kishimoto (岸本 聖紫瑠, Seishika Kishimoto; born 22 February 1990), known professionally as Cecil Kishimoto (岸本 セシル), is a Japanese model.

== Personal life ==
Cecil Kishimoto was born on February 22, 1990, in Okinawa Prefecture. She is the second daughter of four siblings, with one older sister and two younger brothers.

In March 2018, she announced that she had married a non-celebrity man on February 22, 2018, her 28th birthday, and on February 22 of the following year, she announced the birth of her first child, a daughter.

== Appearances ==
=== Commercials ===
- JTA (2008)
- Warner Music Japan - Rip Slyme "Taiyou to Bikini" (2008)
- Shiseido - Integrate (2010-)
- Baskin-Robbins 31 Ice Cream (2010)
- Suzuki - Palette SW (2012)
- Suntory - Stones Bar (2012)
- ASICS - A77 (2012)
- Daiō Seishi - Elis Ultra Guard Gokusui (2013)

=== TV shows ===
- Another Sky (NTV, 2008-), presenter (From 5 October 2012 To 26 September 2014)

=== CD jackets ===
- Flower - Jacren (19 August 2009)
- Uchinaka Cafe: Relax Time no Cafe Bossa (21 December 2011)

== Bibliography ==
=== Magazines ===
- Non-no, Shueisha 1971-, as a regular model
- More, Shueisha 1977-, as a regular model
- Ray (May 2013), Shufunotomo 1988-, cover (23 January 2013)
- ar (July 2011), Shufu to Seikatsusha 1995-, cover (10 June 2011)

=== Photobooks ===
- Cecil (Shueisha, December 2012) ISBN 9784087806670

== Awards ==
- Elite Model Look Japan 2007 Grand Prix
