= Chinami Suzuki =

Japanese model (born 1989)

- 鈴木 ちなみ
- Born: 鈴木 千奈美 (pronunciation same); 26 September 1989 (age 36); Gifu Prefecture, Japan
- Occupations: Actress; model
- Height: 167 cm (5 ft 6 in)
- Spouse: unknown (m. 2020)
- Children: 3

Chinami Suzuki (鈴木 ちなみ, Suzuki Chinami; born 26 September 1989) is a Japanese model. She also works as a television presenter and actress. She comes from Gifu Prefecture. In 2009, while a university student, she was selected as the Toray swimwear girl. She is currently under an exclusive contract with the fashion magazine With.

In March 2013, she graduated from Rikkyo University. In 2013, she modelled shoes for Asbee. She is also appearing in NHK's "High School Course" on biology. She is appearing in a special commemorating twenty years of the television programme "Mezamashi Doyōbi".

== Filmography ==
- Mata Itsuka Natsu ni (2011)
- Brave Hearts: Umizaru (2012)
- Tokyo Mujirushi Joshi Monogatari (2012)
- Fashion Story: Model (2012)
- Megamisama (2017)

== Publications ==
- Chinami ni (swimwear photograph collection)
