= Akane Hotta =

Japanese model and actress (born 1992)

- 堀田 茜
- Born: 26 October 1992 (age 34); Tokyo, Japan
- Occupations: Model; tarento; actress
- Years active: 2012–present
- Agent: Top Coat
- Spouse: Unknown (m. 2024)
- Website: topcoat.co.jp/akane_hotta

Akane Hotta (堀田 茜, Hotta Akane; born October 26, 1992) is a Japanese actress, model and tarento. She is known for regularly appearing on the NTV morning show Zip! (2013–2015).

== Career ==
In 2009, Hotta participated in the 12th National Beauty Pageant (Japan Bishōjo Contest). Taking that opportunity, she contracted with Oscar Promotion. On November 4, 2012, she won the first runner-up in the Miss Rikkyo University Pageant. In 2013, she hosted the football TV show called Ole! Ardija that aired on Television Saitama. From April 2013 to March 2015, she appeared as a regular guest on the NTV morning show Zip!. In December 2014, she made her television drama debut in Koi Suru Gasshuku Menkyo!. She appeared on the cover of the May 2014 issue of CanCam with Mizuki Yamamoto, she then started working as an exclusive model for the magazine. In March 2015, she graduated from Rikkyo University where she studied French literature.

== Personal life ==
In April 2024, Hotta announced on her Instagram that she is married with a general man.

== Appearances ==
=== Television ===
- Ole! Ardija (Television Saitama, 2013), a host
- Zip! (NTV, 2013–2015) as a regular guest
- A Love Camp License! (NTV, 2014) Chisato Akiyama
- Shimura Za (Fuji TV, 2014–2015) as a regular guest
- Isan Sōzoku (TV Asahi, 2015), Rie Minami
- Mr. Housekeeper, Mitazono (TV Asahi, 2016),
- Kanjo Hachi Gosen Episode 6 (Fuji TV, 2017), Mayu
- Dead Stock Episode 6 (TV Tokyo, 2017), Ume Anzai
- Juyo Sankounin Tantei (TV Asahi, 2017), Makiko Makita
- Doctor-Y (S2) (TV Asahi, Amazon Prime, 2017), Kayako Yotsuya
- Kiss that Kills (NTV, 2018), Nao Mori
- Mr. Hiiragi's Homeroom (NTV, 2019), Mizuki Morisaki
- The School of Water Business (TBS, MBS, 2019), Haruka Ounabara
- The Secrets (Fuji TV, KTV, 2020), Aoi Nasu
- Peanut Butter Sandwich (MBS, 2020), Sayo Katagiri
- Isekai Izakaya "Nobu" (WOWOW, 2020), Hermina
- Invisible (TBS, 2022), Natsuki Igarashi
- Isekai Izakaya "Nobu" Season 2 (WOWOW, 2022), Hermina

=== Film ===
- Impossibility Defense (2018)
- Liar! Uncover the Truth (2019)
- Come On, Kiss Me Again! (2020)
- Apparel Designer (2020)
- Humanoid Monster Bela (2020)
- Mieruko-chan (2025), Arai
- Catching the Stars of This Summer (2025), astronaut

=== Music videos ===
- Takahiro Nishijima (AAA) Nissy - Dance Dance Dance (3 June 2015)

=== Radio ===
- Hitori Joshikai (MBS Radio, 2014)

=== Commercials ===
- Otsuka Pharmaceutical - Soyjoy (2013)
- Shogakukan - CanCam (2014)

=== Events ===
- Kansai Collection (2015 S/S)
- Girls Award (2014 A/W, 2015 S/S)

== Bibliography ==
=== Magazines ===
- CanCam, Shogakukan 1982-, as an exclusive model since May 2014
