= Youn-a =

South Korean model (born 1985)

- ヨンア
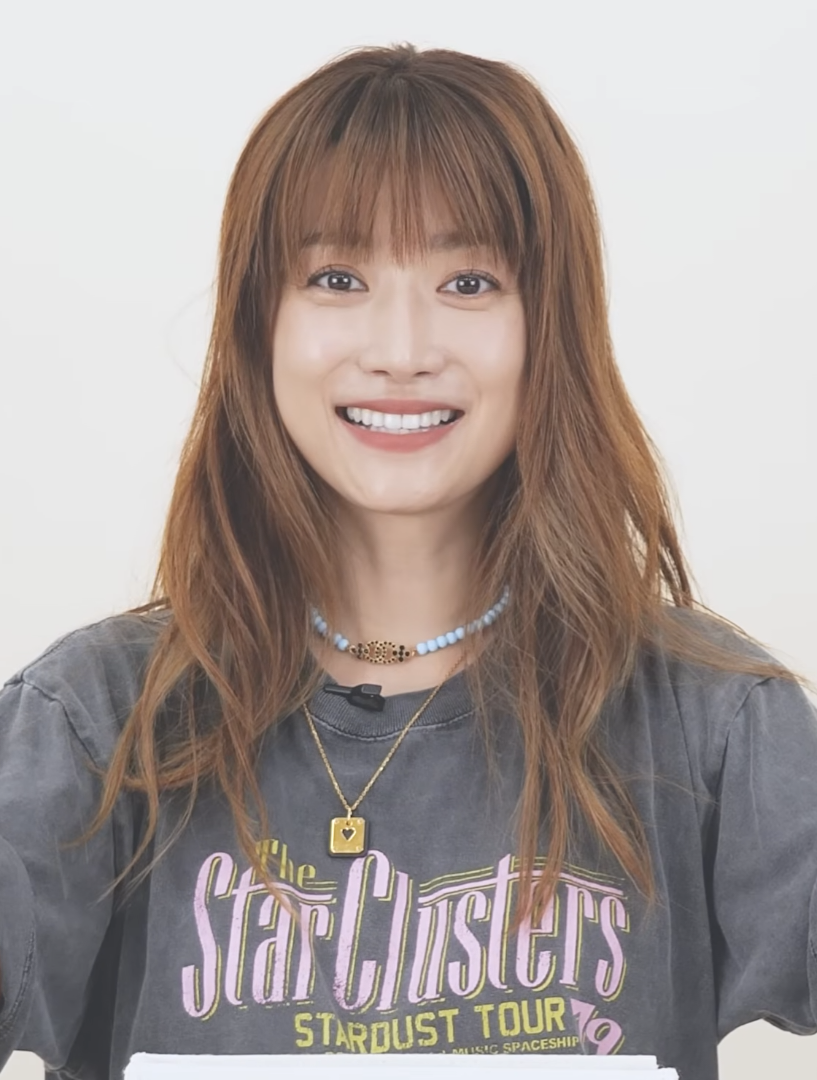
- Youn-a in 2023
- Born: Kim Young-a; October 29, 1985 (age 41); Seoul, South Korea
- Occupation: Model
- Years active: 2003–present
- Height: 5 ft 8 in (2 m)
- Spouse: Unknown (m. 2009; div. 2013) Kotaro Shiba (m. 2014; div. 2023)
- Children: 1

Korean name
- Hangul: 김영아
- RR: Gim Yeonga
- MR: Kim Yŏnga
- Website: binari.co.jp

Kim Young-a (Korean: 김영아; born October 29, 1985) better known by her stage name Youn-a (ヨンア, Yon'a) is a South Korean model based in Japan and affiliated with Binari.

== Life and career ==
Youn-a was born on October 29, 1985, in Seoul, South Korea. She gained widespread public recognition in 2003 through a KT EVER telecom commercial alongside actor Go Soo while she was in high school. She later landed the role as Choi Min-yong's younger sister in the popular MBC sitcom Nonstop 3.

Late in 2003, she was selected as a regional advertisement model for FamilyMart's Pan-Asian campaign, which led to her being scouted by Japanese modeling agencies and moving to Tokyo in early 2004. Her career took off after signing an exclusive contract with Shogakukan's women's fashion magazine Oggi, where she became a staple cover model and high-profile image model for nearly a decade. Her success in print media led to numerous Japanese TV commercials, variety show appearances, and television roles, including the 2007 NHK drama Dondo Hare.

== Filmography ==
=== TV series ===
Year	Title	Role	Network	Other notes
2007	Dondo Hare		NHK	
2020	Mystic Pop-up Bar	Lady-in-waiting	JTBC	Cameo (Ep. 3)
