= Mayuko Kawakita =

American-born actress and model

- 河北 麻友子
- Born: November 28, 1991 (age 34); New York City, New York, U.S.
- Occupations: Actress; model
- Years active: 2003 – present
- Agent: Oscar Promotion
- Height: 1.63 m (5 ft 4 in)
- Spouse: Unknown (m. 2021)
- Children: 2
- Website: mayuko-kawakita

Mayuko Kawakita (河北 麻友子, Kawakita Mayuko; born November 28, 1991) is a Japanese-American actress and model, known for her role as Rena on Fashion Story: Model, Nippon Television variety show Hirunandesu!, and Sekai no Hatemade Itte Q!. She is the 2003 winner of the Japan Bishōjo Contest which is a beauty pageant held by Oscar Promotion.

== Personal life ==
Kawakita grew up in Tribeca, Manhattan and has an older brother and sister.

In 16 January 2021, Kawakita married a non-celebrity man, whose name was not disclosed. She announced on her social media that she gave birth to their first child, a daughter on 12 April 2023. In 23 October 2025, she announced the birth of her second child.

== Appearances ==
=== Television ===
- Sekaigumi TV (Fuji TV, 2005-2006), Mayu
- Gakkō ja Oshierarenai! Episode 2 (NTV, 2008)
- Orthros no Inu (TBS, 2009), Shiho Aoi
- Bikōjō Keikaku: Suzuki Rinko, 20-sai (KTV, 2010), Rinko Suzuki
- Best Friend (NHK 1seg2, 2010)
- Don Quixote (NTV, 2011), Eri
- Thumbs up! (BS Fuji, 2011), Reiko
- Mōsō Sousa: Kuwagata Kōichi Junkyōju no Stylish na Seikatsu (TV Asahi, 2012), Mizuho Yamamoto
- Sprout (NTV, 2012), Kiyoka Taniyama
- Tokusō Shirei! Aichi Police (Nagoya Broadcasting Network, 2012-2013), Aichi Prefectural Police special investigation unit commander
- Mistake! Episode 2 (Fuji TV, 2013)
- Mission: English Eiken Daisakusen (BS Fuji, 2013-2014), Mari Riviere
- Power Game (NHK BS Premium, 2013), Aya Koike
- Hakuba no Ōji Sama Junai Tekireiki (YTV, 2013), Kaori Higashiyama
- Kurokōchi (TBS, 2013), Tenten
- Yae's Sakura Episode 43, Episode 44 (NHK, 2013), Umeko Tsuda
- Mission: English Eiken Daisakusen Season 2 (BS Fuji, 2014), Mari Riviere
- Shiratori Reiko de Gozaimasu! (tvk, 2016), Reiko Shiratori
- Who is Princess? (2021), Herself (ep. 8)

=== Web dramas ===
- Atelier (2015), Yuri Kōno

=== Films ===
- Hitori Kakurenbo Gekijōban (2009), Ritsuko Uno
- Professor Layton and the Eternal Diva (2009), Hall announcement
- Fashion Story: Model (2012), Rena
- Kū no Kyōkai (2013), Yūko Sawamura
- Taka no Tsume Go: Utsukushiki Elleair Shōshū Plus (2013), Okitemasu Yorunī
- Kumiko, the Treasure Hunter (2014), Kanazaki
- Shiratori Reiko de Gozaimasu! The Movie (2016), Reiko Shiratori
- Detective Conan: The Fist of Blue Sapphire (2019), Rechel Cheong (voice)
- Rules of Living (2025)

== Bibliography ==
=== Books ===
- Kokuminteki Bishōjo: Dai 9-kai Zennihon Kokuminteki Bishōjo Contest (Koudansha, October 2003) ISBN 9784063645347

=== Magazines ===
- Pretty Style, Shogakukan 2002-2011, as an exclusive model 2008-2011
- ViVi, Koudansha 1983-, as an exclusive model since 2012
