= Mitsuki Oishi =

Japanese model and actress

- 大石 参月
- Born: March 22, 1988 (age 38); Naka-ku, Hamamatsu, Shizuoka Prefecture, Japan
- Other names: Micchan (みっちゃん); Mitsuki-chan (みつきちゃん); Mitsuki (みつき)
- Occupations: Model, actress
- Years active: 2004–
- Agent: Avex Management
- Height: 1.6 m (5 ft 3 in) (2013)

Mitsuki Oishi (大石 参月, Ōishi Mitsuki; born 22 March 1988, in Naka-ku, Hamamatsu, Shizuoka Prefecture, Japan) is a Japanese fashion model and actress represented by Avex Management.

== Biography ==
On 2004 Oishi won the Miss Seventeen Grand Prix for the fashion magazine Seventeen. She was an exclusive model until her graduation during the release of the April 2009 issue.

Oishi became a regular model for the magazine ViVi since the release of the June 2009 issue. She is also a regular model for the magazines More and Maquia.

== Filmography ==
=== TV series ===
==== Variety ====
Year	Title	Network	Notes
2007	Channel-a	TVK	MC
2009	Reco Hits!	NTV	
2013	R no Hōsoku	NHK	
2014	Hirunandesu	NTV	
2014	Unbelievable	Fuji TV	
2014	Vs Arashi	Fuji TV	

==== Drama ====
Year	Title	Role	Network	Notes
2008	Ryokiteki na Kanojo	Wakaba Hayashida	TBS	

=== Music videos ===
Year	Title	Notes
2006	WaT "Hava Rava"	
2006	Shinichi Osawa "Our Song"	
2006	Arashi "Aozora Pedal"	
2007	Soffet "Love Story"	
	The Loose Dogs "One Day"	
	Fact "a fact of life"	
2010	Juliet "Yuki Love"	

=== Advertisements ===
Year	Title	Notes
2006	mu-mo	
2010	Samantha Thavasa × ViVi	
2010	Orient Tokei iO	Image model
2010	Sweetie Moon	Image model
2011	mod's hair	Advertisement model

=== Events ===
Year	Title	Notes	Ref.
2010	Girls Award		
2010	Tokyo Girls Collection		
2010	Kobe Collection		
2012	Fukuoka Asia Collection		
2014	Kansai Collection		
2014	Sapporo Collection		
2015	Nihon Joshi Hakurankai: Japan Girls Expo 2015 Haru		
2015	Shizuoka Collection		

=== Mobile series ===
Year	Title	Notes
2008	Koisuru Ketsuekigata	

=== Films ===
Year	Title	Notes
2009	Girls Love	
2009	Tenshi no Koi	

=== Catalogs ===
Year	Title	Notes
2011	Kimono Catalog Model Collection/Furisode no "Takazen" de Rental Kimono: Princess Furisode	

== Bibliography ==
=== Photobooks ===
Year	Title	Notes	Ref.
2008	Mitsuki		
2015	Mitsuki Oishi Style Book: Mitsukiss		

=== Magazines ===
Year	Title	Notes
2004	Seventeen	Exclusive model
2009	ViVi	Exclusive model
2013	Maquia	
2015	More	
