= Lena Fujii =

Japanese singer (born 1984)

- 藤井リナ
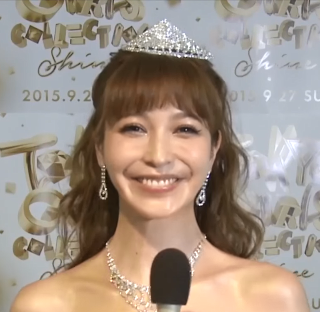
- Fujii in 2016
- Born: July 2, 1984 (age 42); Kawasaki City, Japan
- Other name: Lena
- Occupations: Model; singer
- Modeling information
- Height: 161 cm (5 ft 3 in)
- Hair color: Dark brown
- Eye color: Dark brown
- Website: ameblo.jp/lenalenalena-net

Lena Fujii (藤井リナ, Fujii Rina; born July 2, 1984) is a Japanese model and singer. She is managed by Stellar Entertainment Agency and sometimes goes by the name "Lena". Fujii was scouted in Harajuku and is best known for her work for Japanese fashion magazine ViVi.

== Biography ==
=== Early life ===
Fujii was born in Kawasaki City, Japan to an American father of Japanese and Swiss descent and a Japanese mother. Fujii has a younger brother, Arthur. As a high school student, she traveled to Switzerland to study English following bullying by her Japanese classmates, who would make comments such as "You're a fat one [foreigner] but you don't speak English". In Switzerland, she was also subject to bullying and racism, particularly from one female classmate, who would make racist comments.

When Fujii initially joined her management company, her debut coincided with two other new models, and Fujii recalls getting the least attention.

=== Career ===
Fujii is a regular top print model for Japanese fashion magazines ViVi and sweet, as well as appearing in other magazines like VOCE, Lip, spring, and Cutie. She is the spokesmodel for Canmake Cosmetics and has previously been a spokemodel for the lingerie brand Peach John. She has also done television commercials for McDonald's and Panasonic. She was featured on the covers of DJ Kawasaki's albums Beautiful and Beautiful Too, where she was a vocalist in the song "Bright like Light feat. Lena Fujii". Kawasaki later went on to produce Fujii's debut 7-song house/techno album, titled Lena, released on April 2, 2008. Her first photo book, titled Lena, was released the same month on April 14, 2008. On July 2, 2008, Fujii released a compilation album, ViVi presents Holiday Style – selected by Lena Fujii .

On July 11, 2009, Fujii held her first live concert at Luxy, a nightclub in Taipei, Taiwan. It was reported that she had attracted over one hundred members of the media to a press conference for the concert held the previous day.

On November 4, 2009, Fujii released her second album, Rainbow, in which she performed a cover of Rihanna's hit song "Pon de Replay".

On April 10, 2010, she released her second photo book No Make.

She also produces her own jewellery line, titled Lounsbery.

Fujii is also an actress, known for Rainbow Song-Niji no megami (2006) and Shibuya (2010).
