= Arisa Sato (model) =

Japanese model and weathercaster (born 1988)

- 佐藤 ありさ
- Born: September 20, 1988 (age 37); Hokkaido, Japan
- Occupations: Model, weathercaster
- Years active: 2005 -
- Height: 1.60 m (5 ft 3 in)
- Spouse: Makoto Hasebe (m. 2016)
- Children: 1

Arisa Sato (佐藤 ありさ, Satō Arisa; born September 20, 1988, in Sapporo, Hokkaido, raised in Chiba.) is a Japanese model and weathercaster who is represented by the talent agency Stardust Promotion.

== Filmography ==
=== TV series ===
Year	Title	Network	Notes
2008	LQ: Onna o Ageru 30-bu	NTV	
2008	Koi Fuaku: Minnade Koishiyo! Kētai Shosetsu Factory	Nagoya Broadcasting Network	
2008	Mezamashi TV	Fuji TV	"Motto Ima Doki!"
2010	Gekkan Sakasu	NTV	
2010	Non-no TV	BS-TBS	
2010	Going!Sports&News	NTV	Weathercaster
2011	Toyota Presents FIFA Club World Cup Japan 2011 Highlight	NTV	Club World supporter

=== TV dramas ===
Year	Title	Role	Network	Notes
2008	Love17	Haruhi Hōjō / Chiharu Ogata	Nagoya Broadcasting Network	Lead role
2012	Kekkon Dosokai: Seaside Love	Yuki Minesawa	Fuji TV Two	

=== Films ===
Year	Title	Role	Notes
2010	Remember Hotel	Eri Yamauchi	
2015	Strobe Edge	Mayuka Korenaga	
