= 2008 Japanese television dramas =

←2007 - 2008 - 2009→

This is a list of Japanese television dramas often called doramas by fans.

The list is not complete, and aims to include all those Japanese television dramas that are somehow of interest for Wikipedia contents.

== 2008 Winter season ==
Series

Japanese Title	Romaji Title	TV Station	Time Frame	Starring Actors	Theme Song(s)	Episodes	Average Ratings
交渉人〜THE NEGOTIATOR〜	Kōshōnin ~THE NEGOTIATOR~	TV Asahi	Thursday 21:00~21:54; 10 January 2008 to 28 February 2008	Ryoko Yonekura, Takanori Jinnai, Katsumi Takahashi, Takashi Sasano, Kosuke Suzuki, Toshio Kakei, Megumi Yasu, Sōsuke Takaoka, Yū Shirota, Ren Osugi, Masato Ibu, Megumi Nakayama, Maki Komoto, Noboru Takachi, Tantan Hayashi	Shonannokaze "黄金魂" (Ougon Soul)	8	13.4%
4姉妹探偵団	4 Shimai Tanteidan	TV Asahi	Friday 21:00~21:54; 18 January 2008 to 14 March 2008	Kaho, Noriko Nakagoshi, Natsuki Kato, Yui Ichikawa	YUI "Namidairo"	9	7.0%
未来講師めぐる	Mirai Kōshi Meguru	TV Asahi	Friday 23:15~24:10; 11 January 2008 to 14 March 2008	Kyoko Fukada, Ryo Katsuji, Shinji Takeda, Tomoka Kurokawa, Bokuzo Mazana	Yanawaraba "サクラ" (Sakura)	10	9.1%
薔薇のない花屋	Bara no nai Hanaya	Fuji TV	Monday 21:00~21:54; 14 January 2008 to 24 March 2008	Shingo Katori, Yūko Takeuchi, Yumiko Shaku, Shota Matsuda, Yūki Yagi	Yamashita Tatsurou "ずっと一緒さ" (Zutto Issho sa)	11	18.6%
ハチミツとクローバー	Honey and Clover	Fuji TV	Tuesday 21:00~21:54; 8 January 2008 to 18 March 2008	Riko Narumi, Toma Ikuta, Natsuki Harada, Osamu Mukai, Hiroki Narimiya	Ken Hirai "キャンバス" (Canvas)	11	8.9%
あしたの、喜多善男〜世界一不運な男の、奇跡の11日間〜	Ashita no Kita Yoshio~Sekai-ichi Fuun na Otoko no, Kiseki no Jyuuichinichikan	Fuji TV	Tuesday 22:00~22:54; 8 January 2008 to 18 March 2008	Fumiyo Kohinata, Ryuhei Matsuda, Manami Konishi, Jun Kaname	Yamazaki Masayoshi "真夜中のBoon Boon" (Mayonaka no Boon Boon)	11	7.1%
鹿男あをによし	Shikaotoko Aoniyoshi	Fuji TV	Thursday 22:00~22:54; 17 January 2008 to 20 March 2008	Tamaki Hiroshi, Ayase Haruka	-	10	9.9%
ロス：タイム：ライフ	loss:time:life	Fuji TV	Saturday 23:10~23:55; 2 February 2008 to 5 April 2008	Eita, Keiichiro Koyama, Tomochika, Ueno Juri, Itou Atsushi, Tanaka Naoki, Tokiwa Takako, Yōko Maki, Ooizumi You, Nukumizu Youichi	Orange Range "君station" (Kimi Station)	9	10.3%
鞍馬天狗	Kurama Tengu	NHK	Thursday 22:00~22:43; 17 January 2008 to 6 March 2008	Mansai Nomura, Kotomi Kyono, Michiko Hada	-	8	11.3%
フルスイング	Full Swing	NHK	Saturday 21:00~21:58; 19 January 2008 to 23 February 2008	Katsumi Takahashi, Ran Ito, Kazue Fukishii	Rimi Natsukawa "Ano Hana no Yoni"	6	11.7%
刑事の現場	Keiji no Genba	NHK	Saturday 21:00~21:58; 1 March 2008 to 29 March 2008	Akira Terao, Mirai Moriyama, Saburo Ishikura, Chizuru Ikewaki, Shugo Oshinari	Ohashi Takuya "Arigato"	4	10.5%
篤姫	Atsuhime	NHK	Sunday 20:00~20:58; 6 January 2008 to Autumn 2008 (14 December 2008)	Aoi Miyazaki, Kyōzō Nagatsuka, Kanako Higuchi, Yoshinori Okada, Sumie Sasaki, Eita, Rie Tomosaka, Maki Horikita, Ryo Katsuji, Kinya Kitaoji, Takaaki Enoki, Ikki Sawamura, Yukiyoshi Ozawa, Taizo Harada, Kyoko Maya, Koji Matoba, Yo Kimiko, Hideki Takahashi, Keiko Matsuzaka, Hiroyuki Nagato, Mayo Suzukaze, Yuichiro Yamaguchi, Mikijiro Hira, Yuka Itaya, Matsuda Shota	-	50	24.5%
貧乏男子 ボンビーメン	Binbō Danshi	NTV	Tuesday 22:00~22:54; 15 January 2008 to 11 March 2008	Oguri Shun, Norito Yashima, Yu Yamada, Miura Haruma, Ayumi Lee	BENNIE K "モノクローム" (Monochrome) Lenny Kravitz "Are You Gonna Go My Way" (Image Song) Suzuki Masayuki "上を向いて歩こう" (Ue wo Muite Arukou) (Insert Song)	9	11.6%
斉藤さん	Saitou-san	NTV	Wednesday 22:00~22:54; 9 January 2008 to 19 March 2008	Mizuki Arisa, Mimura, Sasaki Kuranosuke	Mizuki Arisa "ENGAGED"	11	15.5%
1ポンドの福音	1 Pound no Fukuin	NTV	Saturday 21:00~21:54; 12 January 2008 to 8 March 2008	Kazuya Kamenashi, Meisa Kuroki, Satomi Kobayashi, Ryosuke Yamada	KAT-TUN "LIPS"	9	10.6%
3年B組金八先生 8	San nen B-gumi Kinpachi Sensei Series 8	TBS	Thursday 21:00~21:54; 11 October 2007 to 20 March 2008	Kamei Taku, Uekusa Yuuta, Sanada Yuuma	Kaientai "いつか見た青い空" (Itsuka Mita Aoi Sora)	23	9.2%
だいすき!!	Daisuki!!	TBS	Thursday 22:00~22:54; 17 January 2008 to 20 March 2008	Karina, Hiraoka Yuuta, Fukuda Saki, MEGUMI	melody. "遙花～はるか～" (Haruka)	10	11.5%
エジソンの母	Edison no Haha	TBS	Friday 22:00~22:54; 11 January 2008 to 14 March 2008	Ito Misaki, Shimizu Yuuya	Superfly "愛をこめて花束を" (Ai o Komete Hanataba o)	10	9.5%
佐々木夫妻の仁義なき戦い	Sasaki Fusai no Jinginaki Tatakai	TBS	Sunday 21:00~21:54; 20 January 2008 to 23 March 2008	Inagaki Goro, Koyuki	SMAP "そのまま" (Sono Mama)	10	10.9%

== 2008 Spring season ==
Series

Japanese Title	Romaji Title	TV Station	Time Frame	Starring Actors	Theme Song(s)	Episodes	Average Ratings
駅路	Shichinin no Onna Bengoshi Series 2	TV Asahi	Thursday 21:00~21:54; 10 April 2008 to 19 June 2008	Yumiko Shaku, Sachie Hara, Yōko Nogiwa, Masaru Nagai, Tomoko Nakajima, Rieko Miura, Chizuru Azuma, Saori Takizawa, Kaori Nakamura	BoA "Kissing you"	11	10.9%
篤姫	Atsu-hime	NHK	Sunday 20:00~20:58; 6 January 2008 to Autumn 2008 (14 December 2008)	Aoi Miyazaki, Kyōzō Nagatsuka, Kanako Higuchi, Yoshinori Okada, Sumie Sasaki, Eita, Rie Tomosaka, Maki Horikita, Ryo Katsuji, Kinya Kitaoji, Takaaki Enoki, Ikki Sawamura, Yukiyoshi Ozawa, Taizo Harada, Kyoko Maya, Koji Matoba, Yo Kimiko, Hideki Takahashi, Keiko Matsuzaka, Hiroyuki Nagato, Mayo Suzukaze, Yuichiro Yamaguchi, Mikijiro Hira, Yuka Itaya, Matsuda Shota	-	50	24.5%
パズル	PUZZLE	TV Asahi	Friday 21:00~21:54; 18 April 2008 to 20 June 2008	Satomi Ishihara, Yusuke Yamamoto, Ryo Kimura, Kento Nagayama	Kumi Koda "Moon Crying"	10	10.2%
キミ犯人じゃないよね?	Kimi Hannin Janai yo ne?	TV Asahi	Friday 23:15~24:10; 11 April 2008 to 13 June 2008	Shihori Kanjiya, Jun Kaname	YA-KYIM "Super☆Looper"	10	8.9%
CHANGE	CHANGE	Fuji TV	Monday 21:00~21:54; 12 May 2008 to 14 July 2008	Takuya Kimura, Eri Fukatsu, Akira Terao, Rosa Kato, Hiroshi Abe	Madonna "Miles Away"	10	21.7%
絶対彼氏	Absolute Boyfriend	Fuji TV	Tuesday 21:00~21:54; 8 April 2008 to 24 June 2008	Mokomichi Hayami, Hiro Mizushima, Saki Aibu	ayaka "おかえり" (Okaeri)	11	13.2%
無理な恋愛	Muri na Ren'ai	Fuji TV	Tuesday 22:00~22:54; 8 April 2008 to 17 June 2008	Masaaki Sakai, Yui Natsukawa	Masaaki Sakai "忘れもの" (Wasuremono)	11	7.4%
ラスト・フレンズ	Last Friends	Fuji TV	Thursday 22:00~22:54; 10 April 2008 to 19 June 2008	Masami Nagasawa, Juri Ueno, Eita, Ryo Nishikido, Asami Mizukawa, Shigenori Yamazaki	Hikaru Utada "Prisoner of Love"	11	17.7%
ハチワンダイバー	Hachi One Diver	Fuji TV	Saturday 23:10~23:55; 3 May 2008 to 19 June 2008	Junpei Mizobata, Riisa Naka	Aragaki Yui "Make my day"	11	8.4%
バッテリー	Battery	NHK	Thursday 20:00~20:54; 3 April 2008 to 12 June 2008	Yuma Nakayama, Sho Takada, Shintaro Morimoto	Mr.Children "Shounen"	10	7.9%
オトコマエ！	Otokomae!	NHK	Saturday 19:30~20:00; 12 April 2008 to Summer 2008 (5 July 2008)	Seiji Fukushi, Takumi Saito, Kyohei Shibata	-	13	9.2%
トップセールス	Top Sales	NHK	Saturday 21:00~21:58; 12 April 2008 to 31 May 2008	Yui Natsukawa, Kippei Shiina, Hikari Ishida, Makiya Yamaguchi	Ayaka Hirahara "Kudoku no Muko"	8	7.1%
監査法人	Kansahojin	NHK	Saturday 21:00~21:58; 14 June 2008 to 19 July 2008	Takashi Tsukamoto, Nao Matsushita, Kosuke Toyohara, Masanobu Katsumura, Ken Mitsuishi, Isao Hashizume	Masayoshi Yamazaki "Deep Sea Fish"	6	7.9%
篤姫	Atsu-hime	NHK	Sunday 20:00~20:58; 6 January 2008 to 14 December 2008	Aoi Miyazaki, Kyōzō Nagatsuka, Kanako Higuchi, Yoshinori Okada, Sumie Sasaki, Eita, Rie Tomosaka, Maki Horikita, Ryo Katsuji, Kinya Kitaoji, Takaaki Enoki, Ikki Sawamura, Yukiyoshi Ozawa, Taizo Harada, Kyoko Maya, Koji Matoba, Yo Kimiko, Hideki Takahashi, Keiko Matsuzaka, Izumi Inamori, Hiroyuki Nagato, Mayo Suzukaze, Yuichiro Yamaguchi, Mikijiro Hira, Yuka Itaya	-	50	24.5%
おせん	Osen	NTV	Tuesday 22:00~22:54; 22 April 2008 to 24 June 2008	Yū Aoi, Hiroki Uchi	Micro "踊れ" (Odore) Tackey & Tsubasa "恋詩-コイウタ-" (Koiuta)	10	9.1%
ホカベン	Hokaben	NTV	Wednesday 22:00~22:54; 16 April 2008 to 18 June 2008	Aya Ueto, Kazuki Kitamura, Shigeaki Kato, Naho Toda, Eisuke Sasai	Tortoise Matsumoto "涙をとどけて" (Namida wo Todokete)	10	8.1%
ごくせん 3	Gokusen 3	NTV	Saturday 21:00~21:54; 19 April 2008 to 28 June 2008	Yukie Nakama, Katsuhisa Namase, Kyoko Enami, Ken Utsui, Kenji Anan, Ken Kaneko, Shinji Uchiyama, Yuya Takaki, Haruma Miura, Hideo Ishiguro, Junta Nakama, Akito Kiriyama, Shohei Miura, Tomohiro Waki	Aqua Timez "虹" (Niji)	11	22.5%
渡る世間は鬼ばかり 9	Wataru Seken wa Oni Bakari Series 9	TBS	Thursday 21:00~21:54; 3 April 2008 to next season (2009)	Ken Utsui	-	49	15.3%
ルーキーズ	ROOKIES	TBS	Thursday 20:00~20:54; 19 April 2008 to 26 June 2008	Ryūta Satō, Hayato Ichihara, Keisuke Koide, Yū Shirota, Akiyoshi Nakao, Sōsuke Takaoka, Kenta Kiritani, Takeru Sato, Shunji Igarashi, Yōsuke Kawamura, Hiroyuki Onoe, Eri Murakawa	GReeeeN "Kiseki"	11	14.8%
Around40〜注文の多いオンナたち〜	Around40~Jumon no Ooi Onnatachi~	TBS	Friday 22:00~22:54; 11 April 2008 to 20 June 2008	Yūki Amami, Fujiki Naohito, Ootsuka Nene	Takeuchi Mariya "幸せのものさし" (Shiawase no Monosashi)	11	14.7%
猟奇的な彼女	Ryoukiteki na Kanojo	TBS	Sunday 21:00~21:54; 20 April 2008 to 29 June 2008	Kusanagi Tsuyoshi, Tanaka Rena, Matsushita Nao, Suzuki Emi	Kome Kome CLUB "つよがり" (Tsuyogari)	11	8.31%
秘書のカガミ	Hisho no Kagami	TV Tokyo	Friday 24:12~25:00; 11 April 2008 to 27 June 2008	Megumi Yasu	LUV AND RESPONSE "Heaven Knows" RYTHEM "あかりのありか" (Akari no Arika) (Ending Song)	12	N/A

Specials

1. Attention Please: Sydney - starring Ueto Aya, Nishikido Ryo
2. SP
3. Proposal Daisakusen (aka Operation Love) SP - starring Yamashita Tomohisa, Nagasawa Masami

== 2008 Summer season ==
Series

Japanese Title	Romaji Title	TV Station	Time Frame	Starring Actors	Theme Song(s)	Episodes	Average Ratings
篤姫	Atsu-hime	NHK	Sunday 20:00~20:58; 6 January 2008 to Autumn 2008 (14 December 2008)	Aoi Miyazaki, Kyōzō Nagatsuka, Kanako Higuchi, Yoshinori Okada, Sumie Sasaki, Eita, Rie Tomosaka, Maki Horikita, Ryo Katsuji, Kinya Kitaoji, Takaaki Enoki, Ikki Sawamura, Yukiyoshi Ozawa, Taizo Harada, Kyoko Maya, Koji Matoba, Yo Kimiko, Hideki Takahashi, Keiko Matsuzaka, Hiroyuki Nagato, Mayo Suzukaze, Yuichiro Yamaguchi, Mikijiro Hira, Yuka Itaya, Matsuda Shota	-	50	24.5%
オトコマエ！	Otokomae!	NHK	Saturday 19:30~20:00; 12 April 2008 to 5 July 2008	Seiji Fukushi, Takumi Saito, Kyohei Shibata	-	13	9.2%
四つの嘘	Yottsu no Uso	TV Asahi	Thursday 21:00~21:54; 10 July 2008 to 4 September 2008	Hiromi Nagasaku, Shinobu Terajima, Reiko Takashima, Michiko Hada	Tanimura Nana "If I'm not the one"	9	9.3%
ロト6で3億2千万円当てた男	Lotto Six de San-oku Ni-senman En Ateta Otoko	TV Asahi	Friday 21:00~21:54; 4 July 2008 to 5 September 2008	Takashi Sorimachi, Tomoko Nakajima	EXILE "MY FANTASY"	10	6.4%
打撃天使ルリ	Dageki Tenshi Ruri	TV Asahi	Friday 23:15~24:10; 25 July 2008 to 26 September 2008	Rei Kikukawa	Glay "I LOVE YOUをさがしてる" (I LOVE YOU wo Sagashiteru)	10	7.2%
太陽と海の教室	Taiyō to Umi no Kyōshitsu	Fuji TV	Monday 21:00~21:54; 21 July 2008 to 22 September 2008	Yūji Oda, Keiko Kitagawa, Masaki Okada, Kii Kitano, Gaku Hamada, Yuriko Yoshitaka, Satoshi Tomiura, Mitsuki Tanimura, Atsuko Maeda, Aya Omasa, Yusuke Yamamoto, Manami Kurose, Yuichi Nakamura	UZ "君の瞳に恋してる" (Kimi no Hitomi ni Koishiteru)	10	14.5%
シバトラ	Shibatora	Fuji TV	Tuesday 21:00~21:54; 8 July 2008 to 16 September 2008	Teppei Koike, Suzuka Ohgo, Miki Maya, Naohito Fujiki, Muga Tsukaji	Every Little Thing "あたらしい日々" (Atarashii Hibi)	11	12.5%
モンスターペアレント	Monster Parent	Fuji TV	Tuesday 22:00~22:54; 1 July 2008 to 9 September 2008	Yonekura Ryoko, Yūta Hiraoka	Tokunaga Hideaki "愛が哀しいから" (Ai ga Kanashii Kara)	11	12.2%
コード・ブルー -ドクターヘリ緊急救命-	Code Blue -Doctor Heli Kinkyuu Kyuumei-	Fuji TV	Thursday 22:00~22:54; 3 July 2008 to 12 September 2008	Tomohisa Yamashita, Yui Aragaki, Erika Toda, Yosuke Asari, Manami Higa	Mr.Children "HANABI"	11	15.6%
33分探偵	33pun Tantei	Fuji TV	Saturday 23:10~23:43; 2 August 2008 to 27 September 2008	Tsuyoshi Domoto, Asami Mizukawa, Katsumi Takahashi, Jiro Sato, Maho Nonami, Shigeyuki Totsugi, Yoshio Kojima	KinKi Kids "Secret Code"	9	9.1%
乙女のパンチ	Otome no Punch	NHK	Thursday 20:00~20:58; 19 June 2008 to 24 July 2008	Shizuyo Yamasaki, Tomoka Kurotani, Mayuko Iwasa	Namie Amuro "Sexy Girl"	6	8.7%
学校じゃ教えられない！	Gakkō ja Oshierarenai!	NTV	Tuesday 22:00~22:54; 15 July 2008 to 16 September 2008	Kyoko Fukada, Shosuke Tanihara, Ran Ito, Aki Asakura, Aoi Nakamura, Riisa Naka, Win Morisaki, Mizuki Kato, Gouki Maeda, Suzu Natsume, Kohei Norizuki, Miyu Yagyu, Daisuke Yanagisawa	-	10	6.4%
正義の味方	Seigi no Mikata	NTV	Wednesday 22:00~22:54; 9 July 2008 to 10 September 2008	Mirai Shida, Yu Yamada, Shiro Sano, Yoshiko Tanaka, Osamu Mukai, Kanata Hongo, Saori Takizawa, Mariya Nishiuchi	Okumura Hatsune "ホントはね" (Honto wa ne)	10	10.3%
ヤスコとケンジ	Yasuko to Kenji	NTV	Saturday 21:00~21:54; 12 July 2008 to 20 September 2008	Masahiro Matsuoka, Ryōko Hirosue, Mikako Tabe, Tadayoshi Okura, Sayaka Yamaguchi	TOKIO "雨傘" (Amagasa)	10	13%
あんどーなつ	Ando Natsu	TBS	Thursday 20:00~20:54; 7 July 2008 to 22 September 2009	Shihori Kanjiya, Jun Kunimura, Toshinori Omi, Jun Fubuki, Yoshihiko Hosoda	MONKEY MAJIK "Tada, Arigatou (ただ、ありがとう)"	12	9.2%
渡る世間は鬼ばかり 9	Wataru Seken wa Oni Bakari Series 9	TBS	Thursday 21:00~21:54; 3 April 2008 to 2009-03-xx	Ken Utsui	TBA	TBA	N/A
恋空	Koizora	TBS	Thursday 19:56~20:54; 2 August 2008 to 13 September 2008	Elena Mizusawa, Koji Seto	Mai Fukui "Ai no Uta (アイのうた)"	6	6.4%
魔王	Maō	TBS	Friday 22:00~22:54; 4 July 2008 to 12 September 2008	Satoshi Ohno, Toma Ikuta, Ryoko Kobayashi, Kei Tanaka, Shugo Oshinari, Tomohiro Waki, Michiko Kichise, Hitori Gekidan, Yuji Miyake, Koji Ishizaka	Arashi "Truth"	11	11.4%
Tomorrow -陽はまたのぼる-	Tomorrow -Hi wa Mata Noboru-	TBS	Sunday 21:00~21:54; 6 July 2008 to 7 September 2008	Yutaka Takenouchi, Miho Kanno, Ittoku Kishibe, Tamaki Ogawa, Tomoka Kurokawa, Harumi Edo, Takanori Jinnai	Hoshimura Mai "ひかり" (Hikari)	10	12.6%

== 2008 Autumn season ==
Series

Japanese Title	Romaji Title	TV Station	Time Frame	Starring Actors	Theme Song(s)	Episodes	Average Ratings
相棒 7	Aibō 7	TV Asahi	Wednesday; 21:00~21:54; 22 October 2008 to Winter 2009	Yutaka Mizutani, Yasufumi Terawaki, Sawa Suzuki, Saya Takagi, Ittoku Kishibe	-	TBA	TBD
篤姫	Atsu-hime	NHK	Sunday 20:00~20:58; 6 January 2008 to 14 December 2008	Aoi Miyazaki, Kyōzō Nagatsuka, Kanako Higuchi, Yoshinori Okada, Sumie Sasaki, Eita, Rie Tomosaka, Maki Horikita, Ryo Katsuji, Kinya Kitaoji, Takaaki Enoki, Ikki Sawamura, Yukiyoshi Ozawa, Taizo Harada, Kyoko Maya, Koji Matoba, Yo Kimiko, Hideki Takahashi, Keiko Matsuzaka, Hiroyuki Nagato, Mayo Suzukaze, Yuichiro Yamaguchi, Mikijiro Hira, Yuka Itaya, Matsuda Shota	-	50	24.5%
おみやさん	Omiya-san	TV Asahi	Thursday; 20:00~20:54; 16 October 2008 to Winter 2009	Tsunehiko Watase, Atsuko Sakurai, Natsumi Nanase, Kin Sugai	-	TBA	TBD
水戸黄門	Mito Komon Season 9	TBS	Monday; 22:00~22:54; 13 October 2008 to Spring 2009	Satomi Kotaro	-	TBA	TBD
小児救命	Shōni Kyūmei	TV Asahi	Thursday; 21:00~21:54; 16 October 2008 to 18 December 2008	Manami Konishi, Takashi Tsukamoto, Ryo Katsuji, Sayaka Yamaguchi, Tomonori Jinnai, Ren Osugi	B'z "Itsuka Mata Koko de"	9	7.0%
ギラギラ	Giragira	TV Asahi	Friday; 21:00~21:54; 17 October 2008 to 5 December 2008	Kuranosuke Sasaki, Sachie Hara, Miki Maya, Shohei Miura, Shunji Igarashi, Tsuyoshi Abe, Sei Ashina	Girl Next Door "Jonetsu no Daisho"	8	10.2%
サラリーマン金太郎	Salaryman Kintarō	TV Asahi	Friday; 23:15~23:59; 10 October 2008 to 12 December 2008	Masaru Nagai, Waka Inoue, Noriko Aoyama, Shingo Kazama, Ken Utsui, Shigeki Hosokawa	-	10	11.8%
イノセント・ラヴ	Innocent Love	Fuji TV	Monday; 21:00~21:54; 20 October 2008 to 22 December 2008	Maki Horikita, Yujin Kitagawa, Yu Kashii, Seiji Fukushi, Hiroki Narimiya, Yuki Uchida, Kosuke Toyohara	Hikaru Utada "Eternally -Drama Mix-"	10	13.5%
セレブと貧乏太郎	Celeb to Binbō Tarō	Fuji TV	Tuesday; 21:00~21:54; 14 October 2008 to 23 December 2008	Aya Ueto, Yusuke Kamiji, Ryoko Kuninaka, Takashi Kashiwabara, Mayumi Wakamura, Shinji Yamashita, Morio Kazama, Takayuki Takuma, Megumi Nakayama	Ikimono-gakari "Kimagure Romantic"	11	13.1%
チーム・バチスタの栄光	Team Batista no Eikō	Fuji TV	Tuesday; 22:00~22:54; 14 October 2008 to 23 December 2008	Atsushi Itō, Toru Nakamura, Yuu Shirota, Yumiko Shaku, Tsuyoshi Ihara, Yuko Natori, Ryuzo Hayashi, Daisuke Miyagawa, Shingo Tsurumi	Thelma Aoyama "Mamoritai Mono (守りたいもの)	11	13.2%
風のガーデン	Kaze no Garden	Fuji TV	Thursday; 22:00~22:54; 9 October 2008 to 18 December 2008	Kiichi Nakai, Meisa Kuroki, Ryunosuke Kamiki, Ryoko Kuninaka, Eri Ishida, Hiroshi Fuse, Ayaka Hirahara, Guts Ishimatsu, Eiji Okuda	Ayaka Hirahara "Nocturne (ノクターン)"	11	15.7%
ROOM OF KING	ROOM OF KING	Fuji TV	Saturday; 23:15~23:59; 4 October 2008 to 29 November 2008	Hiro Mizushima, Anne Suzuki, Haruka Igawa, Itsuji Itao, Atsuro Watabe	Kimaguren "Ai NEED (愛NEED)"	9	7.3%
赤い糸	Akai Ito	Fuji TV	Saturday; 23:10–23:54; 6 December 2008 to Winter 2009 (28 February 2009)	Nao Minamisawa, Junpei Mizobata, Ryo Kimura, Rei Okamoto, Anna Ishibashi, Nanami Sakuraba, Tomo Yanagishita, Sayuri Iwata, Mirai Moriyama	HY "366 Nichi"	11	7.7%
オー！マイ・ガール！！	Oh! My Girl!!	NTV	Tuesday; 22:00–22:56; 14 October 2008 to 9 December 2008	Mokomichi Hayami, Rosa Kato, Riko Yoshida	Kobukuro "Toki no Ashioto (時の足音)"	9	7.5%
OLにっぽん	OL Nippon	NTV	Wednesday; 22:00–22:56; 8 October 2008 to 10 December 2008	Arisa Mizuki, Sadao Abe, Minami	Speed "Ashita no Sora (あしたの空)"	10	8.0%
スクラップ･ティーチャー	Scrap Teacher	NTV	Saturday; 21:00–21:56; 11 October 2008 to 6 December 2008	Yuto Nakajima, Ryosuke Yamada, Yuuri Chinen, Daiki Arioka, Yusuke Kamiji, Ai Kato, Osamu Mukai, Norito Yashima	Hey! Say! JUMP "Mayonaka no Shadow Boy (真夜中のシャドーボーイ)"	9	11.4%
流星の絆	Ryūsei no Kizuna	TBS	Friday; 22:00~22:54; 17 October 2008 to 19 December 2008	Kazunari Ninomiya, Ryo Nishikido, Erika Toda, Jun Kaname, Mika Nakashima, Toshinori Omi, Ryo, Susumu Terajima, Tomokazu Miura	Arashi "beautiful days" Mika Nakashima "ORION"(Insert Song)	10	16.3%
ブラッディ・マンデイ	Bloody Monday	TBS	Saturday; 19:56~20:52; 11 October 2008 to 20 December 2008	Haruma Miura, Michiko Kichise, Takeru Sato, Yutaka Matsushige, Nana Katase, Hiroki Narimiya, Hisashi Yoshizawa, Sei Ashina	flumpool "Over the rain ~Hikari no Hashi~"	11	11.4%
SCANDAL	SCANDAL	TBS	Sunday; 21:00~21:54; 19 October 2008 to 21 December 2008	Kyōka Suzuki, Kyōko Hasegawa, Kazue Fukiishi, Kaori Momoi, Naho Toda, Ikki Sawamura, Ken Mitsuishi, Kenichi Endō, Fumiyo Kohinata	Miho Fukuhara "LOVE ~winter song~"	10	13.0%
メン☆ドル	Mendol	TV Tokyo	Friday; 24:12~25:00; 10 October 2008 to 26 December 2008	Haruna Kojima, Minami Takahashi, Minami Minegishi	No3b "Relax!" (Opening Song) AKB48 "Ogoe Diamond"	12	N/A

== See also ==
- List of Japanese television dramas
