= 2008 in Japanese television =

Events in 2008 in Japanese television.

== Channels ==
Launches:

- April 1 - Universal Channel (as Sci-Fi Channel, later renamed in 2010)

== Debuts ==
Show	Station	Premiere Date	Genre	Original Run
A Certain Magical Index	Chiba TV	October 4	anime	October 4, 2008 – March 19, 2009
Akaneiro ni Somaru Saka	Chiba TV	October 2	anime	October 2, 2008 – December 18, 2008
Allison & Lillia	NHK	April 3	anime	April 3, 2008 – October 2, 2008
Ancient Ruler Dinosaur King DKids Adventure: Pterosaur Legend	TV Asahi	February 3	anime	February 3, 2008 – August 31, 2008
Atsuhime	NHK	January 6	drama	January 6, 2008 – December 14, 2008
Bara no nai Hanaya	Fuji TV	January 14	drama	January 14, 2008 – March 24, 2008
Clannad After Story	TBS	October 2	anime	October 2, 2008 – March 26, 2009
Engine Sentai Go-onger	TV Asahi	February 17	tokusatsu	February 17, 2008 – February 8, 2009
Full Swing	NHK	January 19	drama	January 19, 2008 – February 23, 2008
Gakko ja Oshierarenai!	Nippon TV	July 15	drama	July 15, 2008 - September 16, 2008
Hakken Taiken Daisuki! Shimajirō	TV Setouchi	April 7	anime/children's variety	April 7, 2008 – March 29, 2010
Itazura na Kiss	CBC	April 9	anime	April 9, 2008 - September 24, 2008
Kamen Rider Kiva	TV Asahi	January 27	tokusatsu	January 27, 2008 – January 18, 2009
Kitty's Paradise peace	TV Tokyo	March 29	children's variety	October 7, 2008 – March 29, 2011
Kirarin Revolution STAGE-3	TV Tokyo	April 4	anime	April 4, 2008 - March 27, 2009
Macross Frontier	MBS	April 4	anime	April 4, 2008 – September 26, 2008
Slayers Revolution	TV Tokyo	July 2	anime	July 2, 2008 – September 24, 2008
Soul Eater	TV Tokyo	April 7	anime	April 7, 2008 – March 30, 2009
Stitch!	TV Tokyo	October 8	anime	October 8, 2008 – March 25, 2009
Tadashii Ouji no Tsukuri Kata	TV Tokyo	January 8	drama	January 8, 2008 – March 25, 2008
Yes! PreCure 5 GoGo!	ABC TV	February 3	anime	February 3, 2008 – January 25, 2009
Yu-Gi-Oh! 5D's	TV Tokyo	April 2	anime	April 2, 2008 – March 30, 2011
Ultra Galaxy Mega Monster Battle: Never Ending Odyssey	BS11	December 20	tokusatsu	December 20, 2008 – March 14, 2009

== Ongoing shows ==
- Music Fair, music (1964–present)
- Mito Kōmon, jidaigeki (1969-2011)
- Sazae-san, anime (1969–present)
- FNS Music Festival, music (1974–present)
- Panel Quiz Attack 25, game show (1975–present)
- Soreike! Anpanman. anime (1988–present)
- Downtown no Gaki no Tsukai ya Arahende!!, game show (1989–present)
- Crayon Shin-chan, anime (1992–present)
- Nintama Rantarō, anime (1993–present)
- Chibi Maruko-chan, anime (1995–present)
- Detective Conan, anime (1996–present)
- SASUKE, sports (1997–present)
- Ojarumaru, anime (1998–present)
- One Piece, anime (1999–present)
- Sgt. Frog, anime (2004-2011)
- Bleach, anime (2004-2012)
- Doraemon, anime (2005–present)
- Gintama, anime (2006-2010)
- Pocket Monsters Diamond & Pearl, anime (2006-2010)
- Naruto Shippuden, anime (2007–2017)

== Endings ==
Show	Station	Ending Date	Genre	Original Run
Akaneiro ni Somaru Saka	Chiba TV	December 18	anime	October 2, 2008 – December 18, 2008
Allison & Lillia	NHK	October 2	anime	April 3, 2008 – October 2, 2008
Ancient Ruler Dinosaur King DKids Adventure	TV Asahi	January 27	anime	February 4, 2007 – January 27, 2008
Ancient Ruler Dinosaur King DKids Adventure: Pterosaur Legend	TV Asahi	August 31	anime	February 3, 2008 – August 31, 2008
Atsuhime	NHK	December 14	drama	January 6, 2008 – December 14, 2008
Ayakashi	AT-X	March 5	anime	December 12, 2007 – March 5, 2008
Bara no nai Hanaya	Fuji TV	March 24	drama	January 14, 2008 – March 24, 2008
Clannad	TBS	March 27	anime	October 4, 2007 – March 27, 2008
D.Gray-Man	TV Tokyo	September 30	anime	October 3, 2006 – September 30, 2008
Eyeshield 21	TV Tokyo	March 19	anime	April 6, 2005 - March 19, 2008
Full Swing	NHK	February 23	drama	January 19, 2008 – February 23, 2008
Gakko ja Oshierarenai!	Nippon TV	September 16	drama	July 15, 2008 - September 16, 2008
Itazura na Kiss	CBC	September 24	anime	April 9, 2008 - September 24, 2008
Juken Sentai Gekiranger	TV Asahi	February 10	tokusatsu	February 19, 2007 – February 10, 2008
Kamen Rider Den-O	TV Asahi	January 20	tokusatsu	January 28, 2007 – January 20, 2008
Kitty's Paradise PLUS	TV Tokyo	September 30	children's variety	October 4, 2005 – September 30, 2008
Kirarin Revolution	TV Tokyo	March 28	anime	April 7, 2006 - March 28, 2008
Ryusei no Rockman Tribe	TV Tokyo	March 29	anime	November 3, 2007 - March 29, 2008
Shima Shima Tora no Shimajirō	TV Setouchi	March 31	anime	December 13, 1993 - March 31, 2008
Slayers Revolution	TV Tokyo	July 2	anime	July 2, 2008 – September 24, 2008
Tadashii Ouji no Tsukuri Kata	TV Tokyo	March 25	drama	January 8, 2008 – March 25, 2008
Ultra Galaxy Mega Monster Battle	BS11	February 23	tokusatsu	December 1, 2007 – February 23, 2008
Yes! PreCure 5	ABC TV	January 27	anime	February 4, 2007 – January 27, 2008
You're Under Arrest: Full Throttle	TBS	March 27	anime	October 4, 2007 – March 27, 2008
Yu-Gi-Oh! Duel Monsters GX	TV Tokyo	March 26	anime	October 6, 2004 – March 26, 2008

== See also ==
- 2008 in anime
- 2008 Japanese television dramas
- 2008 in Japan
- 2008 in Japanese music
- List of Japanese films of 2008
