= 2009 Japanese television dramas =

←2008 - 2009 - 2010→

This is a list of Japanese television dramas (often called doramas by fans) broadcast in 2009.

== 2009 winter season ==
Series

Japanese title	Romaji title	Television station	Time frame	Starring actors	Theme songs	Episodes	Average ratings
相棒 7	Aibō 7	TV Asahi	Wednesday; 21:00~21:54; 22 October 2008 to 18 March 2009	Yutaka Mizutani, Yasufumi Terawaki, Sawa Suzuki, Saya Takagi, Ittoku Kishibe	-	19	18.1%
おみやさん	Omiya-san	TV Asahi	Thursday; 20:00~20:54; 16 October 2008 to 19 March 2009	Tsunehiko Watase, Atsuko Sakurai, Natsumi Nanase, Kin Sugai	-	15	13.2%
渡る世間は鬼ばかり 9	Wataru Seken wa Oni Bakari Series 9	TBS	Thursday; 21:00~21:54; 3 April 2008 to 26 March 2009	Ken Utsui	-	49	13.9%
だんだん	Dandan	NHK	Monday to Saturday; 8:15~8:30; 29 September 2008 to 28 March 2009	Mikura Mana, Mikura Kana	-	25	16.2%
水戸黄門	Mito Kōmon Season 39	TBS	Monday; 22:00~22:54; 13 October 2008 to 23 March 2009	Satomi Kotaro	-	22	N/A
赤い糸	Akai Ito	Fuji TV	Saturday; 23:10~23:54; 6 December 2008 to 28 February 2009	Nao Minamisawa, Junpei Mizobata, Ryo Kimura, Rei Okamoto, Sayuri Iwata; Anna Ishibashi, Nanami Sakuraba, Tomo Yanagishita, Mirai Moriyama	HY "366 Nichi" lego big morl "Ray" (Insert Song)	11	7.7%
天地人	Tenchijin	NHK	Saturday; 19:30~20:00; 4 January 2009 to Autumn 2009 (22 November 2009)	Satoshi Tsumabuki	-	47	TBD
トライアングル	Triangle	Fuji TV; KTV	Tuesday; 22:00~22:54; 6 January 2009 to 17 March 2009	Yōsuke Eguchi, Goro Inagaki, Ryōko Hirosue, Saki Aibu	Kazumasa Oda "Sayonara wa Iwanai"	11	12.3%
ありふれた奇跡	Arifureta Kiseki	Fuji TV	Thursday; 22:00~22:54; 8 January 2009 to 19 March 2009	Yukie Nakama, Ryō Kase	Enya "Arifureta Kiseki"	11	10.6%
Q.E.D.	Q.E.D.	NHK	Thursday; 20:00~20:54; 8 January 2009 to 12 March 2009	Aoi Nakamura, Ai Takahashi	Thelma Aoyama "Konomama, Zutto"	10	5.1%
特命係長只野仁	Tokumei Kakarichou Tadano Hitoshi	TV Asahi	Thursday; 21:00~21:54; 8 January 2009 to 12 March 2009	Takahashi Katsunori, Sakurai Atsuko, Nagai Masaru	Ayumi Sakai "Kanashimi wo Itoshisa de"	8	10.3%
必殺仕事人2009	Hissatsu Shigotonin 2009	TV Asahi	Friday; 21:00~21:54; 9 January 2009 to Spring 2009 (10 April 2009)	Higashiyama Noriyuki, Matsuoka Masahiro, Okura Tadayoshi	The SHIGOTONIN "Kyoka Suigetsu"	11	12.2%
セレぶり3	CeleBry 3	TV Tokyo	Friday; 24:12~25:00; 9 January 2009 to 27 March 2009	Reina Asami, Yuri Nakamura, Maho Nonami	YA-KYIM respects SEAMO "さぁ行こう!" "(Sa Iko!)" SHORT LEG SUMMER "うやむやにしちまえ" (Insert Song)	12	N/A
浪花の華	Naniwa no Hana	NHK	Saturday; 19:30~20:00; 10 January 2009 to 7 March 2009	Kubota Masataka, Chiaki Kuriyama	Quruli "Mikazuki"	9	9.4%
ヴォイス	Voice	Fuji TV	Monday; 21:00~21:54; 12 January 2009 to 23 March 2009	Eita, Ikuta Toma, Satomi Ishihara	GReeeeN "Setsuna"	11	14.5%
メイちゃんの執事	Mei-chan no Shitsuji	Fuji TV	Tuesday; 21:00~21:54; 13 January 2009 to 17 March 2008	Hiro Mizushima, Nana Eikura, Takeru Sato, Yu Yamada	ROCK'A'TRENCH "My SunShine"	10	14.0%
神の雫	Kami no Shizuku	NTV	Tuesday; 22:00~22:54; 13 January 2009 to 10 March 2009	Kazuya Kamenashi, Tanabe Seiichi, Riisa Naka	KAT-TUN "ONE DROP"	9	6.1%
リセット	RESET	NTV	Thursday; 23:58～24:38; 15 January 2009 to 16 April 2008	Tanaka Naoki, Yasu Megumi	Nichika "River's Edge"	14	5.5%
ラブシャッフル	Love Shuffle	TBS	Friday; 22:00~22:54; 16 January 2009 to 20 March 2009	Hiroshi Tamaki, Karina, Shota Matsuda, Daigo	Earth, Wind & Fire " Fantasy" The Bangles "Eternal Flame" (Insert Song)	10	8.7%
歌のおにいさん	Uta no Onii-san	TV Asahi	Friday; 23:15~24:00; 16 January 2008 to 13 March 2009	Satoshi Ohno, Nana Katase	Yano Kenta starring Satoshi Ohno "曇りのち、快晴""(Kumorinochi, Kaisei)"	8	10.8%
銭ゲバ	Zeni Geba	NTV	Saturday; 21:00~21:54; 17 January 2009 to 14 March 2009	Kenichi Matsuyama, Mimura, Miyagawa Daisuke	Kariyushi 58 "Sayonara"	9	9.8%
妄想姉妹	Moso Shimai	NTV	Saturday; 24:55~25:42; 17 January 2009 to 11 April 2009	Mahiru Konno, Kichise Michiko, Mai Takahashi	9mm Parabellum Bullet "Vampiregirl"	12	N/A
本日も晴れ。異状なし	Honjitsu mo Hare. Ijo Nashi	TBS	Sunday; 21:00~21:54; 18 January 2009 to 15 March 2009	Sakaguchi Kenji, Nao Matsushita	Akikawa Masafumi "Negai"	9	8.1%
キイナ	Kiina	NTV	Wednesday; 22:00~22:54; 21 January 2009 to 18 March 2008	Miho Kanno, Yūta Hiraoka, Tsukaji Muga, Eiko Koike	MiChi "ChaNge the WoRLd"	11	14.5%
RESCUE	RESCUE	TBS	Saturday; 19:56~20:52; 24 January 2009 to 21 March 2009	Yuichi Nakamaru, Takahisa Masuda, Yamamoto Yusuke	KAT-TUN "RESCUE"	9	9.7%
超人ウタダ	Chojin Utada	WOWOW	Friday; 24:00~24:54; 30 January 2009 to 20 March 2009	Muga Tsukaji, Jin Katagiri, Masahiko Nishimura	Denki Groove "ア.キ.メ.フ.ラ.イ." "(AKIMEFURAI)"	8	N/A

Specials

1. Nene (寧々)- starring Yukie Nakama, Ichikawa Kamejirō II
2. Fukuie Keibuho no Aisatsu (福家警部補の挨拶)- starring Hiromi Nagasaku, Kotaro Koizumi
3. Akuma no Temari Uta (悪魔の手毬唄)- starring Goro Inagaki, Yūta Hiraoka, Yu Yamada
4. Anmitsu Hime 2 (あんみつ姫2)- starring Mao Inoue, Nagasawa Masami
5. Soka, Mo Kimi wa Inai no Ka (そうか、もう君はいないのか)- starring Tamura Masakazu Tamura, Junko Fuji, Masami Nagasawa
6. Daremo Mamorenai (誰も守れない)- starring Kōichi Satō, Mirai Shida, Ryuhei Matsuda
7. Code Blue SP (コード・ブルー)- starring Tomohisa Yamashita, Yui Aragaki, Erika Toda
8. Zettai Kareshi SP (絶対彼氏) - starring Mokomichi Hayami, Hiro Mizushima, Saki Aibu
9. Keikan no Chi (警官の血)- starring Yōsuke Eguchi, Hidetaka Yoshioka, Hideaki Itō
10. Shirasu Jiro (白洲次郎)- starring Yusuke Iseya, Miki Nakatani, Eiji Okuda

== 2009 spring season ==
Series

Japanese title	Romaji title	Television station	Time frame	Starring actors	Theme songs	Episodes	Average ratings
天地人	Tenchijin	NHK	Saturday; 19:30~20:00; 4 January 2009 to Autumn 2009 (22 November 2009)	Satoshi Tsumabuki	-	47	TBD
空飛ぶタイヤ	The Flying Tire	WOWOW	Sunday; 22:00~22:54; 29 March 2009 to 26 April 2009	Toru Nakamura, Seiichi Tanabe	-	5	N/A
つばさ	Tsubasa	NHK	Monday to Saturday; 8:15~8:30; 30 March 2009 to Summer 2009 (26 September 2009)	Mikako Tabe, Atsuko Takahata	Angela Aki "Ai no Kisetsu"	TBA	TBD
ゴーストフレンズ	Ghost Friends	NHK	Thursday; 20:00~20:54; 2 April 2009 to 4 June 2009	Saki Fukuda, Takahiro Nishijima	Yuzu "Aitai"	10	TBD
京都地検の女	Konkatsu Rikatsu	TV Asahi	Friday; 20:00~20:54; 3 April 2009 to 2009	Sachiko Sakurai, Sayuri Kokushō	LINDBERG "Ima Sugu Kiss Me"	8	TBD
湯けむりスナイパー	Yukemuri Sniper	TV Tokyo	Friday; 24:12~25:00; 3 April 2009 to 2009	Kenichi Endō	TBA	TBA	TBD
イケ麺そば屋探偵	Ikemen Sobaya Tantei	NHK	Thursday; 24:50~25:20; 4 April 2009 to 2009	Fujiki Naohito, Katsuhisa Namase	TBA	TBA	TBD
ゴッドハンド輝	Godhand Teru	TBS	Saturday; 20:00~20:54; 11 April 2009 to 2009	Yūta Hiraoka, Asami Mizukawa, Eri Murakawa, Hirofumi Araki	ONE OK ROCK "Around the World Shonen"	6	8.7%
ハンチョウ	Hancho	TBS	Monday; 20:00~20:54; 13 April 2009 to 2009	Kuranosuke Sasaki, Shunsuke Nakamura	TBA	12	TBD
白い春	Shiroi Haru	NHK	Tuesday; 22:00~22:54; 14 April 2009 to 2009	Hiroshi Abe, Nozomi Ohashi	Ayumi Sakai "Yokogao"	TBA	TBD
アタシんちの男子	Atashinchi no Danshi	Fuji TV	Tuesday; 21:00~21:54; 14 April 2009 to 2009	Maki Horikita	Girl Next Door "Infinity"	11	TBD
アイシテル	Aishiteru	NTV	Wednesday; 22:00~22:54; 15 April 2009 to 2009	Izumi Inamori, Yuka Itaya	MONKEY MAJIK "Aishiteru"	TBA	TBD
漂流ネットカフェ	Hyoryu Net Cafe	NHK	Wednesday; 24:29~25:00; 15 April 2009 to 2009	Atsushi Itō, Reina Asami	TBA	TBA	TBD
BOSS	BOSS	Fuji TV	Tuesday; 22:00~22:54; 16 April 2009 to 2009	Yūki Amami, Yutaka Takenouchi, Toda Erika	superfly "Best Of My Life"	TBA	TBD
ザ・クイズショウ	The Quiz Show	NTV	Saturday; 21:00~21:58; 18 March 2009 to 2009	Sho Sakurai, Yu Yokoyama,	TBA	TBA	TBD
陽炎の辻3	Kagero no Tsuji 3	NHK	Saturday; 19:30~20:13; 18 April 2009 to 11 July 2009	Koji Yamamoto, Noriko Nakagoshi	TBA	14	TBD
ぼくの妹	Boku no Imoto	TBS	Sunday; 21:00~21:54; 19 April 2009 to 2009	Joe Odagiri, Masami Nagasawa	Ikimono-gakari "Futari"	TBA	TBD
婚カツ！	Konkatsu!	Fuji TV	Monday; 21:00~21:58; 20 March 2009 to 2009	Masahiro Nakai, Aya Ueto,	TBA	TBA	TBD
帰ってさこせられた33分探偵	Kaette Kosaserareta 33pun Tantei	Fuji TV	Saturday; 23:00~23:58; 21 March 2009 to 2009	Tsuyoshi Domoto, Asami Mizukawa,	TBA	TBA	TBD
LOVE GAME	LOVE GAME	YTV	Thursday; 23:58~24:38; 23 April 2009 to 2009	Yumiko Shaku	TBA	TBA	TBD
コンカツ・リカツ	Kyoto Chiken no Onna 5	NHK	Thursday; 20:00~20:54; 23 April 2009 to 2009	Yuko Natori, Ikkei Watanabe	THE ALFEE "Sakura no Mi no Jukusuru Toki"	TBA	TBD
魔女裁判	Majo Saiban	Fuji TV	Saturday; 23:00~23:58; 25 April 2009 to 2009	Toma Ikuta, Ai Kato, Manami Higa	Masaharu Fukuyama "Keshin"	TBA	TBD
遥かなる絆	Harukanaru Kizuna	NHK	Saturday; 21:00~21:58; 25 April 2009 to 23 May 2009	Anne Suzuki, Bing Hu	TBA	6	TBD
ツレがうつになりまして。	Tsure ga Utsu ni Narimashite.	NHK	Friday; 22:00~22:54; 29 May 2009 to 12 June 2009	Norika Fujiwara	TBA	3	TBD
風に舞いあがるビニールシート	Kaze ni Maiagaru Vinyl Sheet	NHK	Saturday; 21:00~21:58; 30 May 2009 to 27 June 2009	Kazue Fukiishi	TBA	5	TBD
夫婦道	Fufudo	TBS	Thursday; 21:00~21:54; TBA	Tetsuya Takeda, Atsuko Takahata, Shizuyo Yamasaki	TBA	TBA	TBD
コンカツ・リカツ	Konkatsu Rikatsu	NHK	Friday; 22:00~22:54; TBA	Sachiko Sakurai, Sayuri Kokushō	TBA	TBA	TBD
夜光の階段	Yako no Kaidan	TV Asahi	Thursday; 21:00~21:54; April 2009 to 2009	Fujiki Naohito, Yui Natsukawa, Keiko Oginome	TBA	TBA	TBD
臨場	Rinjo	TV Asahi	Wednesday; 21:00~21:54; April 2009 to 2009	Masaaki Uchino, Yuki Matsushita	TBA	TBA	TBD
スマイル	Smile	TBS	Friday; 22:00~22:54; April 2009 to 2009	Jun Matsumoto, Yui Aragaki	Ringo Shiina "Ariamaru Tomi"	TBA	TBD
名探偵の掟	Meitantei no Okite	TV Asahi	Friday; 23:15~24:00; April 2009 to 2009	Shota Matsuda, Yu Kashii	Baba Toshihide "Fighting Pose no Uta"	TBA	TBD
エゴイスト	Egoist	Fuji TV	Monday to Friday; 13:00~13:30; April 2009 to 2009	Rei Yoshii, Naomi Kawashima	TBA	TBA	TBD
MR. BRAIN	MR. BRAIN	TBS	Saturday; 20:00~20:54; 23 May 2009 to 2009	Takuya Kimura, Haruka Ayase, Hiro Mizushima	TBA	TBA	TBD
ふたつのスピカ	Futatsu no Spica	NHK	Thursday; 20:00~20:54; 11 June 2009 to 23 July 2009	Nanami Sakuraba, Yuichi Nakamura	TBA	TBA	TBD

Specials

1. Ekiro (駅路) - starring Kōji Yakusho, Eri Fukatsu
2. Kamiji Yusuke Monogatari (上地雄輔物語) - starring Yuki Yoshuda, Yusuke Kamiji
3. Kurobe no Taiyo (黒部の太陽) - starring Shingo Katori, Kaoru Koyabashi, Haruka Ayase
4. Gokusen 3 SP (ごくせん) - starring Yukie Nakama, Ken Kaneko, Yuko Nakazawa, Ken Utsui

== 2009 summer season ==
Series

Japanese title	Romaji title	Television station	Time frame	Starring actors	Theme songs	Episodes	Average ratings
天地人	Tenchijin	NHK	Saturday; 19:30~20:00; 4 January 2009 to Autumn 2009 (22 November 2009)	Satoshi Tsumabuki	-	47	TBD
つばさ	Tsubasa	NHK	Monday to Saturday; 8:15~8:30; 30 March 2009 to 26 September 2009	Mikako Tabe, Atsuko Takahata	TBA	TBA	TBD
水戸黄門	Mito Kōmon Season 40	TBS	Monday; 22:00~22:54; 6 July 2009 to Autumn 2009 (December 2009)	Satomi Kotaro	-	TBD	TBD
リミット	Limit	NHK	Saturday; 21:00~21:58; July 2009 to August 2009	Mirai Moriyama, Tetsuya Takeda, Ai Kato	TBA	5	TBD
オルトロスの犬	Orthros no inu	TBS	Friday; 22:00~22:45; 24 July 2009 to October 2009	Takizawa Hideaki, Nishikido Ryo, Mizukawa Asami	TBA		TBD
ブザー・ビート	Buzzer Beat	Fuji TV	Monday; 21:00~22:00; 13 July 2009 to 2009	Yamashita Tomohisa, Kitagawa Keiko, Aibu Saki	TBA		TBD

Specials

1. Shibatora SP (シバトラ) - starring Teppei Koike, Suzuka Ohgo, Miki Maya, Naohito Fujiki

== 2009 autumn season ==
Series

Japanese Title	Romaji Title	TV Station	Time Frame	Starring Actors	Theme Song(s)	Episodes	Average Ratings
天地人	Tenchijin	NHK	Saturday; 19:30~20:00; 4 January 2009 to 22 November 2009	Satoshi Tsumabuki	-	47	TBD
水戸黄門	Mito Kōmon Season 40	TBS	Monday; 22:00~22:54; 6 July 2009 to December 2009	Satomi Kotaro	-	TBD	TBD
LIAR GAME 2	LIAR GAME 2	Fuji TV	Tuesday; 21:00~21:54; November 2009 to 2009	Toda Erika, Masuda Shouta	-	TBD	TBD
深夜食堂	Shin'ya Shokudō	TBS	Friday; 24:29 - 24:59; 9 October 2009 to 11 December 2009	Kaoru Kobayashi	鈴木常吉「思ひ出」	10	TBD
サムライ・ハイスクール	Samurai High School	NTV	Saturday; 21:00 - 21:54; 17 October 2009 to 12 December 2009	Haruma Miura, Yuu Shirota, Watanabe Anne	-	9	TBD

== See also ==
- List of Japanese television dramas
- 2009 in Japanese television
