= 2009 in Japanese television =

Events in 2009 in Japanese television.

== Channels ==
Closures:

- September 30 - Nickelodeon

== Debuts ==
Show	Station	Premiere Date	Genre	Original Run
A Certain Scientific Railgun	AT-X	October 3	anime	October 3, 2009 - March 27, 2010
Dragon Ball Kai	Fuji TV	April 5	anime	April 5, 2009 – March 27, 2011
Metal Fight Beyblade	TV Tokyo	April 5	anime	April 5, 2009 - March 28, 2010
Fairy Tail	TV Tokyo	October 12	anime	October 12, 2009 – March 30, 2013
Fresh Pretty Cure!	ABC TV	February 1	anime	February 1, 2009 – January 31, 2010
Fullmetal Alchemist: Brotherhood	JNN	April 5	anime	April 5, 2009 – July 4, 2010
Jewelpet	TV Osaka	April 5	anime	April 5, 2009 – March 28, 2010
Kami no Shizuku	Nippon TV	January 13	drama	January 13, 2009 - March 10, 2009
Kamen Rider Decade	TV Asahi	January 25	tokusatsu	January 25, 2009 - August 30, 2009
Kamen Rider W	TV Asahi	September 6	tokusatsu	September 6, 2009 – August 29, 2010
Otomen	Fuji TV	August 1	drama	August 1, 2009 - October 27, 2009
Samurai Sentai Shinkenger	TV Asahi	February 15	tokusatsu	February 15, 2009 – February 7, 2010
Shinya Shokudō	MBS	October 10	drama	October 10, 2009 - December 12, 2009
Shussha ga tanoshii keizaigaku	NHK Educational TV	January 10	Comedy/Educational	January 10, 2009 - March 28, 2009
Slayers Evolution-R	TV Tokyo	January 12	anime	January 12, 2009 – April 6, 2009
Tamagotchi!	TV Tokyo	October 12	anime	October 12, 2009 – September 3, 2012
Tsubasa	NHK	March 30	drama	March 30, 2009 - September 26, 2009
Tsure ga Utsu ni Narimashite	NHK	May 29	drama	May 29, 2009 - June 12, 2009

== Ongoing ==
- Music Fair, music (1964–present)
- Mito Kōmon, jidaigeki (1969–2011)
- Sazae-san, anime (1969–present)
- FNS Music Festival, music (1974–present)
- Panel Quiz Attack 25, game show (1975–present)
- Soreike! Anpanman. anime (1988–present)
- Downtown no Gaki no Tsukai ya Arahende!!, game show (1989–present)
- Crayon Shin-chan, anime (1992–present)
- Nintama Rantarō, anime (1993–present)
- Chibi Maruko-chan, anime (1995–present)
- Detective Conan, anime (1996–present)
- SASUKE, sports (1997–present)
- Ojarumaru, anime (1998–present)
- One Piece, anime (1999–present)
- Sgt. Frog, anime (2004–2011)
- Bleach, anime (2004–2012)
- Doraemon, anime (2005–present)
- Gintama, anime (2006–2010)
- Pocket Monsters Diamond & Pearl, anime (2006–2010)
- Naruto Shippuden, anime (2007–present)
- Hakken Taiken Daisuki! Shimajirō, anime/children's variety (2008–2010)
- Kitty's Paradise peace, children's variety (2008–2011)
- Yu-Gi-Oh! 5D's, anime (2008–2011)

== Hiatus ==
Show	Station	Hiatus Date	Genre	Original Run
Shussha ga tanoshii keizaigaku	NHK Educational TV	March 28	Education	January 10, 2009 - March 28, 2009

== Resuming ==
Show	Station	Resumption Date	Genre	Original Run
Shussha ga tanoshii keizaigaku	NHK Educational TV	October 8	Education	October 8, 2009

== Endings ==
Show	Station	Ending Date	Genre	Original Run
A Certain Magical Index	Chiba TV	March 19	anime	October 4, 2008 – March 19, 2009
Akaneiro ni Somaru Saka	Chiba TV	December 18	anime	October 2, 2008 – December 18, 2008
Clannad After Story	TBS	March 26	anime	October 2, 2008 – March 26, 2009
Engine Sentai Go-onger	TV Asahi	February 8	tokusatsu	February 17, 2008 – February 8, 2009
Kamen Rider Decade	TV Asahi	August 30	tokusatsu	January 25, 2009 - August 30, 2009
Kamen Rider Kiva	TV Asahi	January 18	tokusatsu	January 27, 2008 – January 18, 2009
Kami no Shizuku	Nippon TV	March 10	drama	January 13, 2009 - March 10, 2009
Kirarin Revolution STAGE-3	TV Tokyo	March 27	anime	April 4, 2008 - March 27, 2009
Otomen	Fuji TV	October 27	drama	August 1, 2009 - October 27, 2009
Shinya Shokudō	MBS	December 12	drama	October 10, 2009 - December 12, 2009
Shussha ga tanoshii keizaigaku	NHK Educational TV	October 8	Education	October 8, 2009
Slayers Evolution-R	TV Tokyo	January 12	anime	January 12, 2009 – April 6, 2009
Soul Eater	TV Tokyo	March 30	anime	April 7, 2008 – March 30, 2009
Stitch!	TV Tokyo	March 25	anime	October 8, 2008 – March 25, 2009
Tsubasa	NHK	September 26	drama	March 30, 2009 - September 26, 2009
Tsure ga Utsu ni Narimashite	NHK	June 12	drama	May 29, 2009 - June 12, 2009
Ultra Galaxy Mega Monster Battle: Never Ending Odyssey	BS11	March 14	tokusatsu	December 20, 2008 – March 14, 2009
Yes! PreCure 5 GoGo!	ABC TV	January 25	anime	February 3, 2008 – January 25, 2009

== See also ==
- 2009 in anime
- 2009 Japanese television dramas
- 2009 in Japan
- 2009 in Japanese music
- List of Japanese films of 2009
