= Kami no Shizuku =

Kami no Shizuku may refer to:

- Kami no Shizuku, also known as Drops of God, a 2004 Japanese manga series
- Kami no Shizuku (TV series), a Japanese 2009 TV series based on the manga
