= Yūki Tai =

Japanese voice actor (born 1977)

- 泰 勇気
- Born: October 6, 1977 (age 47); Tokyo, Japan
- Occupation: Voice actor
- Years active: 2000–present
- Agent: Remax

Yūki Tai (泰 勇気, Tai Yūki, born October 6, 1977) is a Japanese voice actor. He is currently affiliated with Remax. He has Vietnamese ancestry.

== Filmography ==
=== Anime ===
- Azusa, Otetsudai Shimasu! as Harumaki Shunpei
- Battle B-Daman: Fire Spirits as Grey Michael Vincent
- Bedaman as Grey Michael Vincent
- Beyblade as DJ (ep 29); Engineer A; Yamashita Cane
- Black Butler: Book of Circus as Peter
- D.C. ~Da Capo~ as Jun'ichi Asakura
- D.C.S.S. ~Da Capo Second Season~ as Jun'ichi Asakura
- E's Otherwise as Kai Kudou
- Ef: A Tale of Memories. as Kyōsuke Tsutsumi
- Elfen Lied as Guard
- Fruits Basket as Boy 3 (ep 10); Boy 7 (ep 7); Freshman 2 (ep 13); Man L (ep 3); Student (ep 14)
- Fushigiboshi no Futago Hime as Tabii (ep 4)
- Ghost Hunt as Kazuya Shibuya
- Gift ~eternal rainbow~ as Haruhiko Amami
- Green Green as Male Student
- Hyōka as Takeo Katsuta
- Inazuma Eleven Go as Kariya Masaki
- Inazuma Eleven GO: Chrono Stone as Kariya Masaki, Matchos and Gamma
- Inazuma Eleven GO: Galaxy as Tetsukado Shin
- Juusou Kikou Dancouga Nova as Johnny Burnette
- Jyūshin Enbu - Hero Tales as Hyōsei
- Koi Koi Seven as Tetsurou Tanaka
- Le Chevalier D'Eon as D'Eon de Beaumont
- Love All Play as Ren Miyagi
- Mobile Suit Gundam Seed Destiny as Chen Jian Yi
- Mobile Suit Gundam Seed Destiny Special Edition as Chen Jian Yi
- Naruto: Shippuden as Hashirama Senju (Child), Watase (ep 281)
- Paranoia Agent (ep 2)
- Please Twins! as Ando
- Prism Ark as Acty Axel
- Ryūsei no Rockman Tribe as Burai (Solo/Rogue)
- School Rumble as Nara Kentarou
- School Rumble Nigakki as Masaaki Mitsui; Nara Kentarou
- School Rumble OVA Ichigakki Hoshu as Kentarō Nara
- Shadow Star Narutaru as Ishida (ep 11); Pilot B (ep 7)
- Sonic X as Leon (eps 68,72)
- Spiral as Male Student
- Super Robot Wars Original Generation as Cobray Gordon
- Touken Ranbu as Souza Samonji
- Touken Ranbu as Taroutachi
- Touken Ranbu: Hanamaru 2 as Souza Samonji; Taroutachi
- Touken Ranbu Kai: Kyoden Moyuru Honnōji – Souza Samonji
- Tweeny Witches as Lennon
- Ultimate Girls as Makoto Moroboshi
- Yumeria as Baker-san (ep 8); Male Student B (ep1); Student (ep2-3)

=== Video games ===
- Last Escort 2 as Issei Amane
- Mugen Souls as Elka
- Puyo Puyo Tetris, Puyo Puyo Tetris 2 as Ai
- Record of Agarest War 2 as Faz/Fasty
- Rockman ZX Advent as Helios (Aeolus)
- 3rd Super Robot Wars Alpha: To the End of the Galaxy as Cobray Gordon
- Super Robot Wars series as Johnny Burnette
- Touken Ranbu as Souza Samonji
- Touken Ranbu as Taroutachi
- Sonic Lost World as Zor

=== Dubbing ===
==== Live-action ====
- The Big C – Adam Jamison (Gabriel Basso)

==== Animation ====
- Gravity Falls – Dipper Pines (Jason Ritter)
