= Ai Yoshikawa =

Japanese actress (born 1999)

- 吉川 愛
- Born: 28 October 1999 (age 27); Katsushika, Tokyo, Japan
- Other name: Riko Yoshida
- Occupation: Actress
- Years active: 2005–2016, 2017–present
- Agent: Ken-On

Ai Yoshikawa (吉川 愛(よしかわ あい), Yoshikawa Ai; born October 28, 1999) is a Japanese actress. While working as a child actor she was represented by Moon the Child Agency. Her representative works includes the television series Oh! My Girl!!, Hanayome to Papa and Yamada Taro Monogatari. She is represented by Ken-On. She formerly used the stage name Riko Yoshida (吉田 里琴).

== Filmography ==
=== Film ===
Year	Title	Role	Notes	Ref.
2006	Boy Meets Ghost	young Seiko Katori		
2007	Sakuran	Nihohi		
2008	Kurosagi	Momoka Okugawa		
2008	Ano Sora o Oboeteru	Erika Fukuzawa		
2012	Akko-chan: The Movie	10-years old Akko		
2013	Roommate	young Harumi Hagio		
2018	Rainbow Days	Anna Kobayakawa		
2019	12 Suicidal Teens	Mai		
2019	Hot Gimmick: Girl Meets Boy	Ruri		
2019	Rolling Marbles	Ai	Lead role	
2020	Kotera-san Climbs!	Rino Kurata		
2021	Honey Lemon Soda	Uka Ishimori		
2022	Alivehoon	Natsumi Mutō		
2026	The Ogre's Bride	Yuzu Shinonome	Lead role	
2026	The Mouths	Anne		
2027	Gacha	Rinko Hitomi	Lead role	

=== Television ===
Year	Title	Role	Notes	Ref.
2007	Shinigami no Ballad	Daniel		
2007	Hanayome to Papa	young Aiko		
2007	Yamada Taro Monogatari	Yamada Itsuko		
2007	Hotaru no Hikari Season 1	young Hotaru	Episode 1	
2007	Wachigaiya Itosato	Oito		
2008	Osen	Yuri	Episode 5	
2008	Tomorrow	young Nanami Tanaka	Episode 1	
2008	Seigi no Mikata	young Makiko Nakata	Episode 1	
2008	Oh! My Girl!!	Anne Sakurai		
2009	Mei-chan no Shitsuji	Mamahara Miruku		
2009	Mito Kōmon Season 40	Osato	Episode 10	
2009	Gyne	Yumi Tokumoto		
2009	Clouds Over the Hill	young Masaoka Ritsu	Episode 1	
2010	Hagane no Onna Season 1	Marii Kikuta		
2010	Reinoryokusha Odagiri Kyoko no Uso	Kikuta Sayo	Episode 2	
2010	Perfect Report	Rena Suzuki	Episode 5	
2011	Hagane no Onna Season 2	Marii Kikuta		
2011	Mito Kōmon Season 43	Osato	Episode 7	
2011	Kyoto Chiken no Onna Season 7	Aoi Okazaki	Episode 7	
2012	Beautiful Rain	Nako Matsuyama		
2012	Resident – 5-nin no Kenshui	Maya Saito	Episode 3	
2012	Legal High Season 1	Mei Yasunaga	Episode 8	
2012	Family Song	Haruna	Episode 4	
2013	Midnight Ferris Wheel	Shiho Murata		
2013	Katei Kyoushi ga Toku!	Eri Matsuo		
2013	Amachan	Takahata Alisa	Asadora	
2013	Sennyu Tantei Tokage	Kanon Shida	Episode 2	
2013	Umi no Ue no Shinryojo	Miwa Shirai	Episode 8	
2014	Hanasaku Ashita	middle school Asa Hanasaku		
2014	Sanbiki no Ossan	Miwa Aragaki	Episode 4	
2014	Fukuie Keibuho no Aisatsu	Hina Sugamura	Episode 10	
2014	Tōkyō Tokkyo Kyoka Kyoku	Ayako Sasayama	Episode 1	
2014	White Lab - Keishichō Tokubetsu Kagaku Sōsahan	Yui Makino	Episode 4	
2014	Mahō Danshi Cherrys	Yuki Tenpouji		
2014	Alumni: Three Times in Love	young Akehi		
2014	Last Doctor	Mayuko Yamashita	Episode 8	
2015–16	Minami-kun no Koibito	Horikiri Asuka		
2015	Utsukushiki Wana	Miu Kashiwagi		
2015	Transit Girls	Mirai Kadowaki		
2015	Tales of the Unusual: Fall 2015	Hazuki Hatsuno	Short drama	
2016	Kensatsu Jimukan Kuro Yuri	Sayaka Kurosaka	TV movie	
2017	My Lover's Secret	Karin Uranishi		
2019	Idaten: The Epic Marathon to Tokyo	Atsuko Tabata	Taiga drama	
2019	Sherlock: Untold Stories	Ayaka Takato	Episode 6	
2020	An Incurable Case of Love	Yuika Sakai		
2021	Ochoyan	Mari Uno	Asadora	
2021	Influence	Satoko Hino	Miniseries	
2021	Colorful Love	Wako Machida	Lead role	
2021	Komi Can't Communicate	Rumiko Manbagi		
2022	Hiru	Zōka		
2022	Tomorrow, I Will Be Someone's Girlfriend	Yuki	Lead role	
2022	Love Dissonance	Sae Izumi		
2022	Blue Box Briefing	Sanada	Episode 2	
2023	Fixer	Yuri Numata		
2023	Cinderella of Midsummer	Airi Takigawa		
2024	A Suffocatingly Lonely Death	Kanon Hasumi		
2024	My Undead Yokai Girlfriend	Izzy		
2024	My Diary	Mahiru Shiraishi		
2025	Pararescue Jumper	Yuuna Nogi		
2026	Tokyo MPD PR Unit 2	Kumazaki Kokone		
2026	My Grandfather, the Master Detective	Kaede	Lead role	

=== Japanese dub ===
Year	Title	Role	Notes	Ref.
2021	Raya and the Last Dragon	Raya		
2025	Jurassic World Rebirth	Teresa Delgado		

== Awards and nominations ==
Year	Award	Category	Work(s)	Result	Ref.
2022	45th Japan Academy Film Prize	Newcomer of the Year	Honey Lemon Soda	Won	
2024	27th Nikkan Sports Drama Grand Prix	Best Supporting Actress	Mars and Cinderella of Midsummer	Won	
