= Oh! My Girl!! =

- Directed by: Hiroshi Yoshino; Mitsuru Kubota
- Starring: Mokomichi Hayami; Riko Yoshida
- Country of origin: Japan
- Original language: Japanese
- No. of seasons: 1
- No. of episodes: 9

Production
- Executive producers: Eriko Mikami; Takayuki Akimoto
- Running time: 54 minutes

Original release
- Network: NTV

Oh! My Girl!! (オー!マイ・ガール!!, Ō! Mai Gāru!!) is a Japanese television series which premiered on NTV on October 14, 2008.

== Main cast ==
- Mokomichi Hayami as Kotaro Yamashita, a part-timer publisher and is aspiring to become a mobile phone novelist. He is the younger brother of Hinako, and is the uncle of Anne Sakurai.
- Riko Yoshida as Anne Sakurai, a very popular child actress. She is the secret daughter of Hinako and Kazuo.
- Rosa Kato as Mineko Fuji, the manager of Anne Sakurai.
- Rie Tomosaka as Makiko Yasuno
- Yoshinori Okada as Ken Ishida
- Hitomi Takahashi as Kae Shibuya
- Jingi Irie as Yuta Shibuya
- Mai Shinohara as Mutsumi Shinomiya
- Norihisa Hiranuma as Atsushi Hirakawa
- You as Hinako Ozora
- Arata Furuta as Hirofumi Sugawara
- Takeshi Kaga as Kazuo Ishizaka
- Yoshio Doi as Komiya

== Episodes ==
	Episode title	Romanized title	Translation of title	Broadcast date	Ratings
Ep. 1	オレは召使じゃない! 家にワガママちびっ子女優がやってきた	Ore wa meshitsukai janai! Ka ni wagamama chibi-kko joyū ga yattekita	I am not a servant! A little spoiled actress arrives at the house	October 14, 2008	8.3%
Ep. 2	お金がない!! 犬と少女は家なき子?	Okane ga nai!! Ken to shōjo wa Ienakiko?	There is no money!! The dog and the girl are homeless children?	October 21, 2008	8.3%
Ep. 3	韓流スターでパニック!? 同棲疑惑を晴らせ!	Kan-ryū sutā de panikku!? Dōsei giwaku o harase!	Korean star panic!? Co-habitation confusion clears up!	October 28, 2008	8.0%
Ep. 4	パパの試練!! 叱るって何? 火事で愛情ビンタ	Papa no shiren!! Shikaru tte nan? kaji de aijō binta	Daddy's Test!! What is there to scold? The slap of love due to the fire	November 4, 2008	6.5%
Ep. 5	夢の代金80万円!? ケータイ小説家は諦めない	Yume no daikin 80 man-en!? Kētai shōsetsu-ka wa akiramenai	A novelist's debut decided Dream and chance are worth 800 000 Yen	November 11, 2008	8.1%
Ep. 6	ママが帰ってくる!? 嘘とホントのプレゼント	Mama ga kaette kuru!? Uso to honto no purezento	Mommy's back!? A lie and the real present	November 18, 2008	6.6%
Ep. 7	秘密がバレる!? 俺にしか書けない本当のこと	Himitsu ga bareru!? Ore ni shika kakenai hontō no koto	The secret bared!? A true story that only I can write	November 25, 2008	7.0%
Ep. 8	死んでなかったパパ! 父になれない男の真意	Shin denakatta papa! Chichi ni narenai otoko no shin'i	The Daddy who didn't die! Real intentions of a man who does not get acquainted with Father	December 2, 2008	6.3%
Ep. 9	オレ達は家族母と娘の絆... さよならの決断	Ore-tachi wa kazoku haha to musume no kizuna... sayonara no ketsudan	We are family, a bond between mother and daughter... The decision of bidding farewell	December 2, 2008	8.0%
Ratings for Kantō region (average rating 7.5%）

- All ratings are by Video Research, Ltd..

== Theme song ==
The theme song of Oh! My Girl!! is "Toki no Ashioto" (時の足音, Lit: Footsteps of Time). This was announced on September 6, 2008. This song was sung by Kobukuro as their 16th single.

== Home media ==
In Japan, the DVD version for Oh! My Girl!! was released on 4 March 2009 as a 4-DVD (Region 2) box set sold by VAP, Inc.

Preceded by Gakko ja Oshierarenai! (15/7/2008 - 16/9/2008)	NTV Tuesdays Drama 火曜ドラマ; Tuesday 22:00 - 22:54 (JST)	Succeeded by Kami no Shizuku (3/1/2009 - 10/3/2009)
