= My Undead Yokai Girlfriend =

2024 Japanese television series

Japanese name
- Kanji: 僕の愛しい妖怪ガールフレンド
Transcriptions
- Revised Hepburn: Boku no Itoshii Youkai Girlfriend
- Written by: Yalun Tu; Zach Hines
- Directed by: Takahiro Miki
- Starring: Hayato Sano; Ai Yoshikawa
- Country of origin: Japan
- Original language: Japanese
- No. of episodes: 8

Production
- Producers: Tatsuro Hayashi; Tomiji Kajiwara; Takuya Kitazawa
- Camera setup: Multi-camera
- Running time: 278 minutes (8 episodes)
- Production company: Amazon MGM Studios

Original release
- Network: Amazon Prime Video
- Release: March 22, 2024

My Undead Yokai Girlfriend (Japanese: 僕の愛しい妖怪ガールフレンド, Hepburn: Boku no Itoshii Youkai Girlfriend) is a Japanese horror romantic comedy television series directed by Takahiro Miki and written by Yalun Tu and Zach Hines. Produced by Amazon MGM Studios, and stars Hayato Sano and Ai Yoshikawa. The series premiered on Amazon Prime Video on March 22, 2024.

== Cast ==
- Hayato Sano as Hachi
- Ai Yoshikawa as Izzy
- Nagisa Saitō as Misa Inukai

== Production ==
The series was announced on Amazon Prime Video. The filming took place in Kyoto, Japan.

== Reception ==
Jeremy Looney of Common Sense Media rated the series 3/5 stars. Joel Keller of Decider reviewed the series.
