= Nichika =

Japanese musical group

- Origin: Japan
- Genres: Pop
- Years active: 2006 – active
- Labels: Yoshimoto R and C (2007–2009)
- Website: http://www.nichika.jp

Nichika (二千花) is a Japanese musical group formed in 2006, consisting of singer Issui Miyamoto and musician/composer Yōichirō Nomura. The group's name, which combines the number "2,000" and the word for "flower", derives from their hope of being "the flower of the new century."

Their major debut in 2007 with the single Edelweiss, they have gone on to release several more singles and a self-titled album. Their second single Genius Party was featured as the theme song of a series of short animated films of the same name, and their latest single River's Edge was featured as the theme song of the Japanese TV drama RESET.

Artists they have collaborated with include KT Tunstall, members of GREAT3, and Chappie.

The news of their disbandment was first announced by Miyamoto through her blog on December 15, 2009. A few days after it was finally posted on their official site on the 23rd.

In 2012, Nichika became active again with live concerts. Their next live concert is scheduled for 2014.

== Members ==
- Issui Miyamoto (宮本一粋) – born March 29, 1986. From Fukuoka Prefecture. She sings and occasionally assists with lyric writing as part of the team Pockets of Demo.
- Yōichirō Nomura (野村陽一郎) – born July 14, 1978. From Gifu Prefecture. He plays guitar and keyboards, composes songs and occasionally provides backup vocals.

== Discography ==
=== Singles ===
- Edelweiss (エーデルワイス) (2007.02.14)
- Genius Party (2007.07.04) – theme song of Genius Party
- Atarashii Mizu (あたらしい水) (2008.05.21)
- Aijō (愛情) (2008.11.26)
- River's Edge (リバーズエッジ) (2009.02.18) – theme song of Japanese TV drama RESET

=== Albums ===
- Nichika (二千花) (released 2008.06.18)
