= Erena Mizusawa =

Japanese model and actress (born 1992)

- 水沢 エレナ
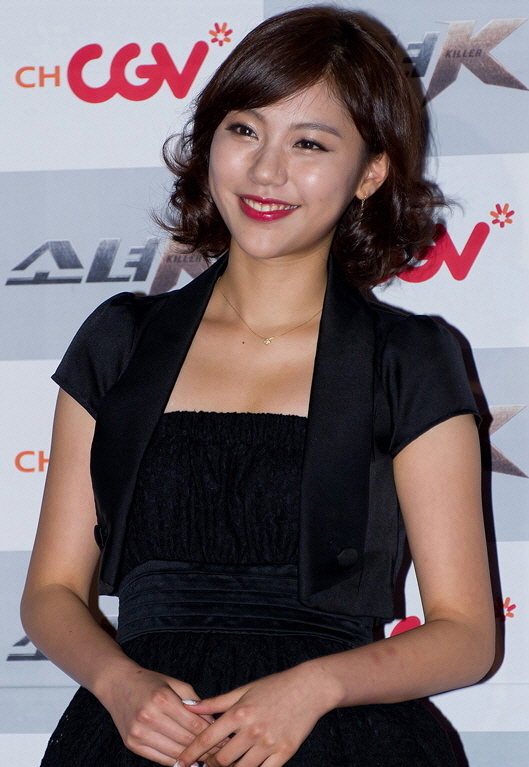
- Erena Mizusawa in August 2011
- Born: March 21, 1992 (age 34); Nagoya, Aichi Prefecture, Japan
- Occupations: Actress; fashion model
- Years active: 2005–present
- Height: 170 cm (5 ft 7 in)
- Spouse: Unknown (m. 2023; div. 2025)
- Website: oscarpro.co.jp

Erena Mizusawa (水沢 エレナ, Mizusawa Erena; born 21 March, 1992) is a Japanese fashion model and an actress. She was once a model for the teen magazine Candy and later modelled for another fashion magazine, Seventeen. She left Seventeen in 2011. She became an actress in spring 2007, appearing and starring in several TV dramas. She is now currently a model for Japanese magazine Non-no. She is half Korean on her mother's side.

== Personal life ==
Mizusawa announced on March 22, 2023, via her official social media account, that she would be marrying her non-celebrity partner, whom she had been dating for some time. However on March 14, 2026, she announced her divorce since last year.

== Filmography ==
=== Film ===
Year	Title	Role	Notes	Ref.
2009	Feel the Wind			
2011	When I Kill Myself			
2014	Clover			
2023	Majo no Kōsui	Mai Hara		

=== TV drama ===
Year	Title	Role	Network	Notes	Ref.
2008	Koizora	Mika Tahara	TBS	Lead role	
2009	The Quiz Show Season 2	Misaki Nitta	NTV		
2009	Jin	Hatsune	TBS		
2010	Mioka	Mari Goto	NTV		
2012	Beginners!	Yoko Fukuhara	TBS		
2013	Doctor-X: Surgeon Michiko Daimon	Risa Hashimoto	TV Asahi		
2014	Senryokugai Sosakan	Arisa Tabuchi	NTV		
2014	Zero's Truth: Forensic Medical Examiner Matsumoto Maou	Haruko Akiyama	TV Asahi		
2014	The Perfect Insider | Subete ga F ni Naru	Momoko Kunieda	Fuji TV		
2014	Kurofuku Monogatari	Seira	TV Asahi		
2015	Wild Heroes	Mifumi Nonaka	NTV		
2016	Sumika Sumire	Arisa Kosaka	TV Asahi		
2018	#Hashtag	Kanami	Tokyo MX	Lead role	

=== Radio ===
- All Night Nippon R (June 2008)
- J-Wave Tokyo Morning Radio (September 2011)

=== Promotional video ===
- Oasis (September 5, 2007)
- Yakusoku (November 14, 2007)
- Kiseki (February 13, 2008)
- Promise You (February 3, 2009)
- Tabidachi Graffiti (November 24, 2010)
