= List of Mega Man Star Force episodes =

The following is a list of episodes for the Mega Man Star Force anime series, known in Japan as Ryūsei no Rockman (流星のロックマン, Ryūsei no Rokkuman; Shoting Star Rockman). The anime is currently composed of two series: the original series and Tribe. The anime series began on October 7, 2006, in Japan, and an English adaptation premiered on Toonami Jetstream on July 23, 2007.

The original Japanese episodes are roughly 10 minutes long, so the English version combines two episodes together to fill a single 30-minute time-slot. (An exception was made with Japanese episode 25 which was accompanied by ten minutes of recycled footage from previous episodes.) The show has only ever aired once on television as a 2-hour faux-movie presentation—composed of heavily slimmed-down versions of Japanese episodes 1 through 16—on Cartoon Network. Currently, it is unknown if it will ever air regularly on television, so the English air dates below refer only to the online airings on Toonami Jetstream.

== Mega Man Star Force (original series) ==
#	Japanese title	English title	Original air date	English air date
01	"Tōbōsha Warrock" (逃亡者ウォーロック, Tōbōsha Wōrokku; Fugitive Warrock)	"Omega-Xis: The Fugitive"	2006-10-07	2007-07-23
02	"First Contact" (ファーストコンタクト, Fāsuto Kontakuto)	"Omega-Xis: The Fugitive"	2006-10-14	2007-07-23
03	"Denpa Virus" (電波ウイルス, Denpa Uirusu; "Electromagnetic Wave Virus")	"Electromagnetic Wave Change!"	2006-10-21	2007-07-30
04	"Denpa Henkan!" (電波変換!, Denpa Henkan!; Electromagnetic Wave Change!)	"Electromagnetic Wave Change!"	2006-10-28	2007-07-30
05	"Subaru, On Air!!" (スバル、オン·エア!!, Subaru, On Ea!!)	"Trouble Takes Wing"	2006-11-04	2007-08-06
06	"Cygnus no Chōsen!" (キグナスの挑戦!, Kigunasu no Chōsen!; Cygnus's Challenge!)	"Trouble Takes Wing"	2006-11-11	2007-08-06
07	"Eisei Tsuiraku!" (衛星墜落!, Eisei Tsuiraku!; Satellite Crash!)	"Crowded Air Waves"	2006-11-18	2007-08-20
08	"Ox Shūrai!" (オックス襲来!, Okkusu Shūrai!; Ox Invasion!)	"Crowded Air Waves"	2006-11-25	2007-08-20
09	"Bōsō Ox Fire" (暴走オックス·ファイア, Bōsō Okkusu Faia; Rampaging Ox Fire)	"Two New Visitors"	2006-12-02	2007-08-27
10	"Harp Singer Kenzan" (ハープ·シンガー見参, Hāpu Shingā Kenzan; Meet Harp Singer)	"Two New Visitors"	2006-12-09	2007-08-27
11	"Harp Note Suisan!" (ハープ·ノート推参!, Hāpu Nōto Suisan!; Harp Note's Surprise Debut!)	"The Song of Lyra Note"	2006-12-16	2007-09-04
12	"Virus Ningen Arawaru!?" (ウイルス人間現わる!?, Uirusu Ningen Arawaru!?; A Virus Human Appears!?)	"The Song of Lyra Note"	2006-12-23	2007-09-04
13	"Ikuta-sensei no Kagaku Kyōshitsu" (育田先生の科学教室, Ikuta-sensei no Kagaku Kyōshitsu; Ikuta-sensei's Science Classroom)	"Science Friction"	2007-01-06	2007-09-17
14	"Libra Ikuta no Kiken na Kyōshitsu" (リブラ育田の危険な科学教室, Ribura Ikuta no Kiken na Kyōshitsu; Libra Ikuta's Dangerous Classroom)	"Science Friction"	2007-01-13	2007-09-17
15	"Warau Denpa Kūkan" (笑う電波空間, Warau Denpa Kūkan; Laughing Electromagnetic Wave Space)	"Laughter in EM Wave Space"	2007-01-20	2007-10-01
16	"Okoru Denpa Kūkan" (怒る電波空間, Okoru Denpa Kūkan; Enraging Electromagnetic Wave Space)	"Laughter in EM Wave Space"	2007-01-27	2007-10-01
17	"Utau Denpa Kūkan" (唄う電波空間, Utau Denpa Kūkan; Singing Electromagnetic Wave Space)	"From Double to Bubble"	2007-02-03	2007-10-15
18	"Cancer Sanjō buku!" (キャンサー参上ブク!, Kyansā Sanjō buku!; Calling on Cancer buku!)	"From Double to Bubble"	2007-02-10	2007-10-15
19	"Rockman Kyūbin" (ロックマン急便, Rokkuman Kyūbin; Rockman Express Mail)	"Mega Man Express and Wolf Woods"	2007-02-17	2007-10-29
20	"Ueki Shokujin wa Tsuki ni Howl" (植木職人は月に吠える, Ueki Shokujin wa Tsuki ni Hoeru; The Gardener Howls at the Moon)	"Mega Man Express and Wolf Woods"	2007-02-24	2007-10-29
21	"Wolf: Ikari no Hōkō!" (ウルフ 怒りの咆哮!, Urufu Ikari no Hōkō!; Wolf: Howl of Anger!)	"Wolf: Roar of Anger"	2007-03-03	2007-11-12
22	"Denpa na Yūrei" (デンパなユーレイ, Denpa na Yūrei; Electromagnetic Wave Ghost)	"Wolf: Roar of Anger"	2007-03-10	2007-11-12
23	"Fujimi no Jibaku Rei" (不死身のジバク霊, Fujimi no Jibaku Rei; The Immortal Suicidal Spirit)	"Collision Course"	2007-03-17	2007-11-26
24	"Ophiuchus Queen" (オヒュカス·クイーン, Ohyukasu Kuīn)	"Collision Course"	2007-03-31	2007-11-26
25	"Itoshi no Rockman-sama♥" (愛しのロックマン様♥, Itoshi no Rokkuman-sama♥; Beloved Rockman-sama♥)	"Biggest Fan or Biggest Foe?"	2007-03-31	2007-12-10
26	"Kaettekita Otoko" (帰って来た男, Kaettekita Otoko; The Man Who Returned)	N/A	2007-04-07	-
27	"Cygnus Gundan" (キグナス軍団, Kigunasu Gundan; Cygnus Corps)	N/A	2007-04-14	-
28	"Denpa Kuraishisu" (電波クライシス, Denpa Kuraishisu; Electromagnetic Wave Crisis)	N/A	2007-04-21	-
29	"Satellite no Kiseki" (サテライトの奇蹟, Sateraito no Kiseki; The Satellites' Miracle)	N/A	2007-04-28	-
30	"Kenja no Inori" (賢者の祈り, Kenja no Inori; Prayer of the Sages)	N/A	2007-05-05	-
31	"Star Force!" (スターフォース!, Sutā Fōsu!)	N/A	2007-05-12	-
32	"Kesshū! FM-seidan" (結集! FM星団, Kesshū! Efuemu-seidan; Concentration! Planet FM Cluster)	N/A	2007-05-19	-
33	"Gyakushū! FM-seidan" (逆襲! FM星団, Gyakushū! Efuemu-seidan; Counterattack! Planet FM Cluster)	N/A	2007-05-26	-
34	"Kizamaro wa Mita!" (キザマロは見た!, Kizamaro wa Mita!; Kizamaro Saw!)	N/A	2007-06-02	-
35	"Shirisugita Kizamaro" (知りすぎたキザマロ, Shirisugita Kizamaro; Kizamaro, Who Knew Too Much)	N/A	2007-06-09	-
36	"Lovely Unbalance" (ラブリィ·アンバランス, Raburī Anbaransu)	N/A	2007-06-16	-
37	"Libra no Sentaku" (リブラの選択, Ribura no Sentaku; Libra's Choice)	N/A	2007-06-23	-
38	"Ippiki Ōkami, Kawareru" (一匹狼、飼われる, Ippiki Ōkami, Kawareru; The Lone Wolf, as a Pet)	N/A	2007-06-30	-
39	"Kawareta Ōkami, Abareru" (飼われた狼、暴れる, Kawareta Ōkami, Abareru; The Pet Wolf, in a Rage)	N/A	2007-07-07	-
40	"Iinchō Shitsuren Daisakusen buku!" (委員長失恋大作戦ブク!, Iinchō Shitsuren Daisakusen buku!; The Chairman's Great Unrequited Love Plan buku!)	N/A	2007-07-14	-
41	"Drama de Shuraba no Daisakusen buku" (ドラマで修羅場の大作戦ブク!, Dorama de Shuraba no Daisakusen buku!; The Great Drama Fight Scene Plan buku)	N/A	2007-07-21	-
42	"Hatsumei Daimaō Utagai" (発明大魔王宇田海, Hatsumei Daimaō Utagai; Utagai, the Great Demon Inventor King)	N/A	2007-07-28	-
43	"AMAKEN Daipanikku" (アマケン大パニック, Amaken Daipanikku; The Great AMAKEN Panic)	N/A	2007-08-04	-
44	"Libra Balance Hōkai" (リブラ·バランス崩壊, Ribura Baransu Hōkai; Collapse of Libra Balance)	N/A	2007-08-11	-
45	"Uchūjin mo Nayande Iru" (宇宙人も悩んでいる, Uchūjin mo Nayande Iru; Aliens Also Worry)	N/A	2007-08-18	-
46	"W Luna no Daifuntō" (Wルナの大奮闘, Daburu Runa no Daifuntō; W Luna's Difficult Struggle)	N/A	2007-08-25	-
47	"W Luna no Tengoku to Jigoku" (Wルナの天国と地獄, Daburu Runa no Tengoku to Jigoku; W Luna's Heaven and Hell)	N/A	2007-09-01	-
48	"Warrock wa Gentleman" (ウォーロックはジェントルマン, Wōrokku wa Jentoruman; Warrock's a Gentleman)	N/A	2007-09-08	-
49	"Gaikotsu Change!" (がいこつチェンジ!, Gaikotsu Chenji!; Skeleton Change!)	N/A	2007-09-15	-
50	"Kokuhaku" (告白, Kokuhaku; Confession)	N/A	2007-09-22	-
51	"Brother Band" (ブラザーバンド, Burazā Bando)	N/A	2007-09-29	-
52	"Minus Energy" (マイナスエネルギー, Mainasu Enerugī)	N/A	2007-10-06	-
53	"Futatsu no Kizuna" (ふたつの絆, Futatsu no Kizuna; Twin Bonds)	N/A	2007-10-13	-
54	"Andromeda" (アンドロメダ, Andoromeda)	N/A	2007-10-20	-
55	"FM-ō Cepheus" (FM王ケフェウス, Efuemu-ō Kefeusu; FM King Cepheus)	N/A	2007-10-27	-

== Shooting Star Rockman (Tribe) ==
#	Japanese title	English title	Original air date	English air date
01	"Mū no isan" (ムーの遺産, Mū no isan; The Inheritance of Mu)	N/A	2007-11-03	-
02	"Mū no fūin" (ムーの封印, Mū no fūin; The Seal of Mu)	N/A	2007-11-10	-
03	"Burai no shūgeki" (ブライの襲撃, Burai no shūgeki; Burai's Attack)	N/A	2007-11-17	-
04	"Hatsudō, Berserk no Ken!" (発動、ベルセルクの剣!, Hatsudō, Beruseruku no Ken!; Come Forth, Sword of Berserk!)	N/A	2007-11-24	-
05	"Himanala no yukiotoko" (ヒマナラの雪男, Himanara no yukiotoko; The Yeti of the Himanalas)	N/A	2007-12-01	-
06	"Himanala no Mū iseki" (ヒマナラのムー遺跡, Himanara no Mū iseki; The Mu Ruins of the Himanalas)	N/A	2007-12-08	-
07	"Hyde to Ghost" (ハイドとゴースト, Haido to Gōsuto; Hyde and Ghost)	N/A	2007-12-15	-
08	"Tameshi no ken" (試しの剣, Tameshi no ken; Sword of Trials)	N/A	2007-12-22	-
09	"Dossy no shinsō" (ドッシーの真相, Dosshī no shinsō; The Truth About Dossy)	N/A	2008-01-05	-
10	"Brachio no negai" (ブラキオの願い, Burakio no negai; Brachio's Wish)	N/A	2008-01-12	-
11	"Sennyū! Nansca Mura" (潜入!ナンスカ村, Sennyū! Nansuka Mura; Infiltration! Nansca Village)	N/A	2008-01-19	-
12	"Kyōfu no kamisama" (恐怖の神様, Kyōfu no kamisama; Terrifying God)	N/A	2008-01-26	-
13	"Shugyō de osaru" (修行でおさる, Shugyō de osaru; Training de osaru)	N/A	2008-02-02	-
14	"Ninja yashiki no Oopart" (忍者屋敷のオーパーツ, Ninja yashiki no ōpātsu; Oopart of the Ninja Mansion)	N/A	2008-02-09	-
15	"Mitsudomoe, Oopart sōdatsusen" (三つ巴,オーパーツ争奪戦, Mitsudomoe, ōpātsu sōdatsusen; Three-way Oopart Struggle)	N/A	2008-02-16	-
16	"Berabō na sakusen!?" (ベラボーな作戦!?, Berabō na sakusen!?; An Absurd Strategy!?)	N/A	2008-02-23	-
17	"Hyde no sakuryaku" (ハイドの策略, Haido no sakuryaku; Hyde's Scheme)	N/A	2008-03-01	-
18	"Orihime no shōtai" (オリヒメの正体, Orihime no shōtai; Orihime's True Colors)	N/A	2008-03-08	-
19	"Mu no Empty" (無のエンプティ, Mu no Enputi; "Empty of Naught")	N/A	2008-03-15	-
20	"Kokō no senshi Burai" (孤高の戦士ブライ, Kokō no senshi Burai; The Soldier of Loneliness, Burai)	N/A	2008-03-22	-
21	"Mū-tairiku no kettō" (ムー大陸の決闘」, Mū-tairiku no kettō; The Duel of the Continent Mu)	N/A	2008-03-29	-
