= List of Mega Man Star Force episodes (Tribe) =

This article covers the second series of the Mega Man Star Force anime series, known in Japan as Ryūsei no Rockman Tribe (流星のロックマン トライブ, Ryūsei no Rokkuman Toraibu; Shooting Star Rockman Tribe). The series premiered in Japan on November 3, 2007, and has 21 episodes in total. Following the trend of the original series, Japanese episodes are roughly 10 minutes long. The series follows the events of the second Nintendo DS Mega Man Star Force video game. Yūko Sera, Kencho Ishikawa, Masayuki Nomoto, Akira Takahashi, Shingo Adachi and Shintetsu Takiyama are the art directors for the series. As the English version of the original series was never completed, there are no plans for an English adaptation of Tribe. The episodes below are listed separately according to their Japanese broadcast as no English versions have aired.

#	Japanese title	Original air date
01	"Mū no isan" (ムーの遺産, Mū no isan; The Inheritance of Mu)	November 3, 2007
A new breed of radio wave viruses have substantiated at a museum, so Geo investigates. While there, he notices a strange aura emitting from a display item called the "Sword of Zerker." Soon after, two new enemies appear (Yeti Blizzard and Dark Phantom) and begin to battle one another for the sword. In the heat of the struggle to protect the sword, Omega-Xis accidentally ingests it, and the enemies flee.
02	"Mū no fūin" (ムーの封印, Mū no fūin; The Seal of Mu)	November 10, 2007
After discussing the incident with Sonia, Geo meets a professor named Vega. She explains that Cepheus's activity on Earth recently awakened the EM wave residents (UMAs) of the lost continent Mu. Mu was sealed with an extremely powerful EM wave being within it, and the UMAs wish to break the seal in order to release the being. But to do so, they require three OOParts—one of which is the Sword of Zerker stuck in Omega-Xis's stomach—and Vega hopes to cooperate with Geo in order to retrieve the OOParts first. Suddenly however, a mysterious new enemy named Rogue attacks the university and assaults Geo...
03	"Burai no shūgeki" (ブライの襲撃, Burai no shūgeki; Burai's Attack)	November 17, 2007
Mega Man and Rogue (who is after the Sword of Zerker) battle, but Rogue is eventually forced to retreat after Vega intervenes with a large jamming beam that disrupts EM wave activity. Later, Geo takes Omega-Xis to AMAKEN to have the sword extracted from his stomach, and in the meantime, he and his friends play a materialization hammer game using the Star Carriers.
04	"Hatsudō, Berserk no Ken!" (発動、ベルセルクの剣!, Hatsudō, Beruseruku no Ken!; Come Forth, Sword of Berserk!)	November 24, 2007
Geo explains the quest for the OOParts to Sonia, who expresses interest in helping. Rogue attacks again, and the duo transform into Mega Man and Lyra Note to fight. Rogue attempts to take the Sword of Zerker, but Mega Man suddenly uses it to transform into the Thunder Zerker form for first time, and defeats him.
05	"Himanala no yukiotoko" (ヒマナラの雪男, Himanara no yukiotoko; The Yeti of the Himanalas)	December 1, 2007
Vega sends Geo to the snowy mountain range of Himanala to locate an OOPart. There, he meets a village girl named Lana who assists him in his search. She also tells of a yeti that has been terrorizing the village recently. Upon further investigation, Geo encounters Yeti Blizzard realizing that he was the yeti creature that Lana spoken about earlier, but he escapes amidst their battle.
06	"Himanala no Mū iseki" (ヒマナラのムー遺跡, Himanara no Mū iseki; The Mu Ruins of the Himanalas)	December 8, 2007
Mega Man's quest for the OOParts deepens as he begins to explore the ruins in the Himanalas. Yeti Blizzard tails him, hoping to swipe the treasure for himself, and Lyra Note also appears to aid Mega Man. In the end, there was no treasure, and Yeti Blizzard is defeated in an inevitable confrontation with the heroes.
07	"Hyde to Ghost" (ハイドとゴースト, Haido to Gōsuto; Hyde and Ghost)	December 15, 2007
Geo receives word from Vega of an OOPart hidden in a pyramid. Meanwhile, a painter named Hyde recalls when he first met his UMA partner, Phantom. Together, they are also traveling to the pyramid. Mega Man explores the pyramid with hesitation, but eventually meets Hyde inside. Hyde transforms into Dark Phantom, and Mega Man counters with Thunder Zerker, but the sword is going out of control!
08	"Tameshi no ken" (試しの剣, Tameshi no ken; Sword of Trials)	December 22, 2007
The sword causes Geo to retreat, allowing Dark Phantom to peacefully investigate the pyramid alone. To make matters worse, Rogue soon appears and knocks Mega Man unconscious. Within Geo's psyche, he encounters the sword thrust into the ground. In an allusion to The Sword in the Stone, Geo is able to pull the sword from the ground, awaken, and take control the Thunder Zerker form to defeat Rogue. Meanwhile, Dark Phantom finds that, unfortunately, the pyramid holds no treasure.
09	"Dossy no shinsō" (ドッシーの真相, Dosshī no shinsō; The Truth About Dossy)	January 5, 2008
There's been a lot of buzz at Dombler Village about a lake beast nicknamed Dossy (a parody of Nessie), so Geo travels there out of curiosity. He encounters a television director named Gerry Romero who is secretly gathering data on the beast. Furthermore, he runs into Rich Dotcom (the partner of UMA Yeti). Gerry is eventually pursued by UMA Plesio and transforms into Plesio Surf, defeating both Yeti Blizzard and Mega Man before retreating.
10	"Brachio no negai" (ブラキオの願い, Burakio no negai; Brachio's Wish)	January 12, 2008
Geo and Sonia discuss recent events when they meet the UMA Plesio. Plesio has been trying to protect the lake from intruders and pollution, and he had attacked Mega Man in error. However, Rich commands a group of workers to begin filling in the lake, enraging Plesio Surf and causing him to attack them. Mega Man and Lyra Note intervene, giving Rich the opportunity to submerge to the lake's bottom and steal the OOPart (The Rock of Saurian) hidden below.
11	"Sennyū! Nansca Mura" (潜入!ナンスカ村, Sennyū! Nansuka Mura; Infiltration! Nansca Village)	January 19, 2008
Geo and Sonia travel to Nansuka Village after hearing word of a mysterious ruin that may contain an OOPart. They meet the chieftain Osa Agame who shares his love of flowers to the children before taking them to a festival in honor of their worshiped god. Geo is surprised to meet Luna there. Later that night, Cancer Bubble walks in on Osa as he is overcome by UMA Condor.
12	"Kyōfu no kamisama" (恐怖の神様, Kyōfu no kamisama; Terrifying God)	January 26, 2008
Osa transforms into Terra Condor and rampages through the village. Geo and Sonia quickly transform to battle with him, but he escapes with Luna as his hostage. The two heroes assault him once more to rescue their friend, and this time, Mega Man is able to penetrate the UMA's grasp on Osa by reminding him of his love for flowers. The fusion dissipates and Osa declares Mega Man as Nansuka's new savior.
13	"Shugyō de osaru" (修行でおさる, Shugyō de osaru; Training de osaru)	February 2, 2008
Geo seeks a possible OOPart within a ninja academy, but in order to enter, he must enroll in ninja training. He's accompanied by his friends Luna, Bud, Zack, Sonia, and Cancer Bubble. Their trainer puts them through a variety of rigorous tests, and upon completing them, Geo discovers that both Hyde and Rich are also enrolling in the school.
14	"Ninja yashiki no Oopart" (忍者屋敷のオーパーツ, Ninja yashiki no ōpātsu; Oopart of the Ninja Mansion)	February 9, 2008
After a hard night of training, Rich and Hyde sneak off into the ninja mansion in search of the OOPart. Geo also sneaks off to try to find it. Along the way, Rich and Hyde encounter the ninja instructor and transform to battle with him. Geo also transforms and discovers the OOPart, only to be attacked suddenly by Rogue. When Yeti Blizzard and Mega Man bring their OOParts close to the one in the mansion, a portal to Mu opens, and Rogue escapes into it. As it closes, Yeti Blizzard and Dark Phantom escape, the latter taking the OOPart (The Star of Ninja) with him.
15	"Mitsudomoe, Oopart sōdatsusen" (三つ巴,オーパーツ争奪戦, Mitsudomoe, ōpātsu sōdatsusen; Three-way Oopart Struggle)	February 16, 2008
Yeti Blizzard and Dark Phantom team up to take on Mega Man, but Dark Phantom retreats amidst the battle. Later, Geo is approached by Rich Dotcom, offering Geo a large sum of money in exchange for the Sword of Zerker inside Omega-Xis. Geo refuses and the two of them begin to battle on the rooftops. Meanwhile, Hyde begins hosting painting lessons to elementary school children including Geo's friends Luna, Bud, and Zack.
16	"Berabō na sakusen!?" (ベラボーな作戦!?, Berabō na sakusen!?; An Absurd Strategy!?)	February 23, 2008
Yeti Blizzard and Mega Man continue to battle. However, their fight over the OOParts attracts EM wave viruses which begin to rampage through the city, much to the Satella Police's dismay. Meanwhile, Hyde continues his painting lessons and eavesdrops on Luna's conversation to discover Mega Man's true identity. When he discovers that Geo's mother is attending the lessons, he threatens Mega Man to hand over his OOPart in exchange for his mother's safety.
17	"Hyde no sakuryaku" (ハイドの策略, Haido no sakuryaku; Hyde's Scheme)	March 1, 2008
After ditching Yeti Blizzard, who refused to let go of Mega Man, he rushes off to save Hope, but fails to stop Dark Phantom from escaping with his mother. Joined by Lyra Note, the two pursue the UMA across the city, but cannot attack because Dark Phantom uses Hope as a shield. After cruelly taunting Geo with his mother's life, Dark Phantom scores a decisive victory against him and Lyra Note, but before he can finish them off a revived Yeti Blizzard intervenes. The two decide to rush the greatly weakened Mega Man, but he is saved by an unlikely savior: Hollow.
18	"Orihime no shōtai" (オリヒメの正体, Orihime no shōtai; Orihime's True Colors)	March 8, 2008
Vega arrives and orders Hollow to retrieve the two OOParts. Yeti Blizzard and Dark Phantom are no match for Hollow's speed and electric attacks, and are swiftly defeated and stripped of their OOParts, leaving them in their human forms. With two of the three OOParts in her possession, Vega's demeanor changes, and she reveals to Geo her plan to use the three OOParts to revive the being Le Mu in order to create a new world. Geo resolves to stop her, and activates Thunder Zerker form in order to battle Hollow.
19	"Mu no Empty" (無のエンプティ, Mu no Enputi; "Empty of Naught")	March 15, 2008
Hollow quickly proves to be Geo's toughest opponent yet. His attacks are blinding fast and no matter how many times Geo lands a blow, Hollow shows no signs of damage. Aaron and the Satella Police soon arrive on scene, and Aaron and Tom locate the source of Hollow's unstoppable power, a device located within Vega's car. After Copper destroys it with his signal jammer, Geo finally manages to harm Hollow, but Vega uses the two OOParts in her possession to heal him. With the three artifacts in such close proximity, a portal to Mu appears in the sky.
20	"Kokō no senshi Burai" (孤高の戦士ブライ, Kokō no senshi Burai; The Soldier of Loneliness, Burai)	March 22, 2008
Mega Man is pulled into the portal to Mu, and is followed by Hollow, Lyra Note, as well as Yeti Blizzard and Dark Phantom, Vega, and Copper. Hollow finally overwhelms Geo and pulls the Sword of Zerker out of Omega-Xis and presents it to Vega, who has by now convinced Dark Phantom and Yeti Blizzard to help her in exchange for immortality. Geo is joined by Sonia and the two discover and awaken a comatose Solo (Rogue's human true identity), who weakly explains how he is the last inhabitant of Mu and protects the seal on Le Mu. Though greatly weakened, he transforms into his wave form and goes off to confront Vega.
21	"Mū-tairiku no kettō" (ムー大陸の決闘」, Mū-tairiku no kettō; The Duel of the Continent Mu)	March 29, 2008
Vega revives Le Mu using the OOParts while Lyra Note confronts Dark Phantom and Yeti Blizzard. Rogue takes on Hollow and holds him off for a while. Geo sees that Omega-Xis is being smothered in a pool of dangerous substance. He then jumps down to save him and rises back up in his EM form. Copper shouts out to Mega Man to grab the OOParts before Le Mu comes to life. He grabs them all and Mega Man transforms into the ultimate amalgamation of all three OOParts: Tribe King. Using this ultimate power, Mega Man destroys Hollow, but Vega escapes arrest. As everyone escapes Mu, Rogue appears and uses what's left of his energy, with the help of Tribe King Mega Man to seal Le Mu and close the portal to Mu with Vega still inside. With disaster averted, life goes back to normal for Geo and his friends.

== See also ==
- List of Mega Man Star Force episodes
- Mega Man Star Force (anime)
- Mega Man Star Force (video game)
