= Suzu Natsume =

Japanese actress (born 1991)

- 夏目 鈴
- Born: March 13, 1991 (age 34); Kobe, Hyōgo Prefecture, Japan
- Occupation: Actress
- Agents: Amuse inc; W-Up
- Height: 1.69 m (5 ft 7 in) (2011) or 1.68 m

Suzu Natsume (夏目 鈴, Natsume Suzu; born March 13, 1991, in Kobe, Hyōgo Prefecture, Japan) is a Japanese actress who is represented by the talent agencies, Amuse inc, and later W-Up.

== Filmography ==
=== TV series ===
Year	Title	Role	Network	Notes
	Sexy Voice and Robo		NTV	Episode 5
2007	Life	Rie Uda	Fuji TV	
2008	Gakkō ja Oshierarenai!	Maho Kameda	NTV	
2010	Flunk Punk Rumble	Saori Tachibana	TBS	
2013	Hōkago Groove	Nishi-senpai	TBS	Episode 1

=== Films ===
Year	Title	Role	Notes
2010	Battle of Demons	Azusa Suzawa	
2010	Handmade Angel	Chisato Hagi	
2011	Gachiban Ultimata	Mina Nanba	
2012	Furyō Shōnen 3,000-ri no sō Ban		
2012	Real Onigokko 5		
2013	Tokyo Twilight	202 woman	
2013	Monster	Naoko Okui	
