= Shussha ga tanoshii keizaigaku =

Shussha ga tanoshii Keizaigaku (出社が楽しい経済学; lit. "Economics makes going to work fun") is a television program whose 12 episodes were broadcast on NHK educational television in 2009, and again on NHK satellite television channel two, and on NHK general TV in August of the same year, including a special edition. Series two was aired on NHK General TV in the fall of the same year.

The program introduces, in the form of a comedy drama set, daily events at a fictitious trading company named "ZENY", while introducing keywords and principles from economics.

== See also ==
- List of economics journals
- Outline of economics
