= Lego Big Morl =

Japanese band

- Origin: Osaka, Japan
- Genres: Rock
- Years active: 2006–present
- Labels: A-Sketch, Oorong-sha
- Members: Takehiro Kanata; Hiroki Tanaka; Shintarou Yamamoto; Hiro Asakawa
- Website: legobigmorl.jp

Lego Big Morl (stylized LEGO BIG MORL, previously lego big morl) is a Japanese rock band from Osaka, made up of four men: Takehiro Kanata (vocals, guitar), Hiroki Tanaka (guitar), Hiro Asakawa (drums), Shintarou Yamamoto (bass). It is called "lego" for short. The band is managed by Oorong-sha and signed to A-Sketch.

They started the band in Osaka in 2006, and had a tour a year later. After that, their song "Ray" was adopted as a featured song on the drama, Akai ito. The song peaked at number 41 on the Oricon singles chart and in the following year they made their major debut. Their album Quartette Parade reached number 28 on the Oricon album chart in 2009.

"Ray" was covered by Ko Shibasaki in 2010.

== History ==
=== 2006 ===
After Asakawa's band split up in March, he asked Kanata to form a band with him. Tanaka, who was in the same band as Kanata, joined the new band, followed by Yamamoto, who was a friend of Kanata from high school. They started performing mainly in Osaka.

=== 2007 ===
They held a first live tour in Tokyo, Yokohama, Ibaraki, and Gunma in March. They gave out free CDs "Tequila Goodbye (テキーラグッバイ)" at live events.

=== 2008 ===
They released a ¥100 single "Moonwalk for a Week", which reached number four on the indies chart. They also released a first mini album Tuesday and Thursday. From this time, they began performing at big music festivals and events. In December, they released their first single "Ray", which became one of the songs on the soundtracks of the Fuji TV drama and movie Akai ito.

== Members ==
- Takehiro Kanata (1984.5.24) – vocals, guitar
- Hiroki Tanaka (1984.10.25) – guitar
- Shintarou Yamamoto (1984.10.18) – bass
- Hiro Asakawa (1984.11.10) – drums

== Discography ==
=== Albums ===
==== Studio albums ====
Title	Album details	Peak chart positions		Sales (Note: Sales provided by Oricon database and are rounded to the nearest hundred copies.)	Certifications
Title	Album details	Oricon Albums Chart	Billboard Japan Top Albums (Note: Week references for Billboard Japan Top Albums Sales: Quartette Parade, Mother Ship, New World, Tuesday and Thursday, Lovers, Birthday, Music.)	Sales	Certifications
Quartette Parade	Released: January 28, 2009; Label: Oorong; Format: CD, digital download	28	70		
Mother Ship	Released: September 1, 2010; Label: Oorong; Format: CD, digital download	33	40	3,800	
Re:Union	Released: December 7, 2011; Label: Oorong; Format: CD, digital download	69	—	2,000	
New World	Released: October 22, 2014; Label: A-Sketch; Format: CD, digital download	33	31	2,400	

==== Extended plays ====
Title	Album details	Peak chart positions		Sales	Certifications
Title	Album details	Oricon Albums Chart	Billboard Japan Top Albums	Sales	Certifications
Tuesday and Thursday	Released: June 11, 2008; Label: Oorong; Format: CD, digital download	58	52		
For Flowers	Released: November 16, 2011; Label: Oorong; Format: CD	—	—		

==== Compilation album ====
Title	Album details	Peak chart positions		Sales	Certifications
Title	Album details	Oricon Albums Chart	Billboard Japan Top Albums	Sales	Certifications
Lovers, Birthday, Music	Released: June 22, 2016; Label: Oorong; Format: CD, digital download	40	34	2,100	

=== Singles ===
Title	Year	Peak chart positions		Sales	Certifications	Album
Title	Year	Oricon Singles Chart	Billboard Japan Hot 100 (Note: Week references for Billboard Japan Hot 100: "Ray", "Afureru", "Rainbow".)	Sales	Certifications	Album
"Warp" (ワープ)	2008	—	—			Tuesday and Thursday
"Moonwalk for a Week"	2008	59	—			Tuesday and Thursday
"Ray"	2008	41	55			Quartette Parade
"Afureru" (溢れる; "Overflow")	2009	47	49	2,700		Mother Ship
"Drill Drill" (ドリルドリル)	2010	—	—			Mother Ship
"Balance" (バランス)	2010	—	—			Mother Ship
"Flowers"	2011	—	—			Re:Union
"Knock to Me"	2012	—	—			Non-album single
"Wait?"	2014	—	—			New World
"Rainbow"	2014	52	34	1,500		New World
"Strike a Bell"	2015	51	—	1,200		Non-album single
"End-End"	2016	—	—			Non-album single
