= Shibatora =

Japanese manga series

- First tankōbon volume cover

シバトラ
- Genre: Police
- Manga
- Written by: Yuma Ando
- Illustrated by: Masashi Asaki
- Published by: Kodansha
- Magazine: Weekly Shōnen Magazine
- Original run: 13 December 2006 – 14 October 2009
- Volumes: 15
- Television drama
- Directed by: Yuichi Sato (#1–2,5,8,11); Junichi Ishikawa (#3-4,7,10); Kazuyuki Iwata (#6,9)
- Produced by: Hideki Inada; Yukiko Yanagawa
- Written by: Shogo Muto
- Music by: Yugo Kanno
- Original network: Fuji TV
- Original run: 8 July 2008 – 16 September 2008
- Episodes: 11 + 2 special

Shibatora (シバトラ) is a Japanese manga series written by Yuma Ando and illustrated by Masashi Asaki. It was serialized in Kodansha's Weekly Shōnen Magazine from December 2006 to October 2009 and compiled into 15 tankōbon volumes.

It was adapted as a 11-episode TV drama broadcast in Japan in 2008, starring Teppei Koike as the main protagonist and Suzuka Ohgo as the heroine. The central character is nicknamed "Shibatora" and he forms "Team Shibatora" to investigate crimes.

== Synopsis ==
Taketora Shibata (aka "Shibatora") is just a quiet, ordinary junior-high student. He looks so vulnerable that bullies try to rip him off on the streets. However, he is actually a police detective and an expert swordsman in kendo. Shibata has a special ability to see the "reaper's hands" around people whose life is in danger. One day, the Shibatora team is assigned on an undercover operation. Shibata's covers include a high school student, a maid cafe waitress and a delinquent sentenced to a juvenile detention center... With the cooperation from his various friends, he gets to the bottom of many crimes that occur.

== Characters ==
=== Team Shibatora ===
- Teppei Koike as Taketora Shibata

A juvenile police detective whose famous traits are his baby face and ability to see the reaper's hands. Following the ideals of his father, he believes in and tries to understand the feelings of underage criminals. Hakuto nicknames him "Shibatora", a combination of his first and last name.

- Suzuka Ohgo as Mizuki Hosho

Mizuki Hosho came from a loving family. However, everything changed when her mother died, and her father began to mistreat and abuse her. She wants nothing but to live a happy life with the people close to her.

- Naohito Fujiki as Kojiro Fujiki

A good friend of Shibatora who always supports and backs him up. He is the owner of Sabbath Sabbath, his own clothing store, and also provides room and board for Taketora, Hakuto, and eventually, Mizuki. He seems to have a thug image, and has connections to Helter Skelter, a neighborhood gang.

- Muga Tsukaji as Shinsuke Hakuto

An expert hacker who was released from jail recently. He, along with Kojiro, supports Shibata in his cases behind the scenes. Because of his weight, Kojiro nicknames him "Pig" and often makes jokes at his expense. However, Hakuto becomes the heart behind "Team Shibatora" and proves himself useful by hacking into various databases. Hakuto also manages his own cafe after convincing Kojiro to let him open it in a corner of Sabbath Sabbath.

- Miki Maya as Sakura Chiba

The Director of the Juvenile Safety Division, and Shibata's boss. She often uses illegal undercover operations to accomplish her goals and is known as the "Wild Dog" of the police. She seems to share some past with Kojiro Fujiki.

- Akina Minami as Tamaki Ayukawa

Ayukawa is a female officer in the traffic division. She and her two friends adore Shibata, and later they go to great lengths to make sure his job is kept safe. She eventually becomes Hakuto's object of affection.

=== Other characters ===
- Daisuke Miyagawa as Toru Shinjo

Shinjo is a lazy and rebellious detective. He has a strong dislike for Shibata due to his conflicting ideals, as well as his boss, Sakura Chiba, for abandoning his partner while he was in an illegal undercover operation. As a result, he often tries to interfere with their operations. Unlike his manga counterpart, he is portrayed more as comic relief in the drama.

- Shige Uchida as Kantaro Nanbara

Nanbara is a fan of Shinjo, praising him for everything he does. Though at first Shinjo seems to enjoy it, he eventually becomes more and more irritated with him.

- Naoki Kawano as Yuji Kusunoki

Kusonoki was accused of stealing when he was young, and was subsequently expelled from the prestigious school he was attending. He believes he was judged unfairly, and since his family did not believe in him and shunned him since the incident, it caused him to despise adults and in particular, the police. He is currently a student in the class which Shibata is investigating, making him one of the suspects of the "Onigami" case.

- Shunsuke Daito as Gakuto Kato

Kato's parents abandoned him in their apartment when he was young, only giving him 10,000 yen a month to support himself. Despite hoping for their return for years, Kato has neither seen nor heard from them since then, aside from the monthly money. He came to believe that adults were selfish and greedy, and could not be trusted. Kato was a student in the same class to which Shibata was assigned while undercover, and is one of the suspects of the "Onigami" case.

- Ryosuke Miura as Takeshi Kanazawa

Kanazawa was a student in the same class to which Shibata was assigned while undercover. Along with the other students, he is one of the suspects of the "Onigami" case.

- Haruka Suenaga as Rika Machida

Machida portrays herself as a strong and tough woman. However, her mother ignores her out of her own insecurities, and deep down, Rika is feeling the pain of neglect. Shibata later discovers that Rika became involved in drugs because of it. She was also one of the suspects of the "Onigami" case.

- Ryohei Suzuki as Hiromi Mura

Mura does not have a father. However, he came to see his teacher, Mizoguchi, as his surrogate father. After a scandalous incident, Mizoguchi suddenly vanished from the school, and Mura was blamed for the crime. Feeling betrayed, he sought vengeance against Mizoguchi. He is one of the suspects of the "Onigami" case.

- Ryo Karato as Mizoguchi

Mizoguchi is a former teacher at the high school which Shibata was investigating. While he was there, he treated Mura like a son and taught him boxing as a way to straighten him out. He becomes a victim of the "Onigami" case.

- Ryo Hashizume as Takeo Ochiai

Ochiai was once Shibata's friend, but their differences drove them apart in the end. After being imprisoned for the murder of Shibata's father and Sakura Chiba's sister, he was released for good behavior. However, the imprisonment changed him for the worse, making him the ruthless villain he is today. He is behind many of the crimes Shibata investigates.

- Nobuo Kyo as Takayoshi Ino

Ino was Ochiai's prison mate, who was the primary cause of Ochiai's changes. He was sent to jail for murdering three of his dojo classmates.

- Waka Inoue as Ryoko Tokiwa

Tokiwa is a female officer in a high-ranking position. She follows Sakura Chiba's ideals in doing whatever it takes to reach her goals even more ruthlessly than Sakura Chiba herself.

== Media ==
=== Manga ===
Shibatora is written by Yuma Ando and illustrated by Masashi Asaki. It was serialized in Kodansha's Weekly Shōnen Magazine from 13 December 2006 to 14 October 2009. Kodansha compiled its individual chapters into fifteen tankōbon volumes published between 17 May 2007 and 17 November 2009.

=== Drama ===
A Japanese television drama was announced in the 24th issue of Weekly Shōnen Magazine on 14 May 2008. Yugo Kanno served as composer for the series and Every Little Thing performed the opening theme "Atarashii Hibi" (あたらしい日々; lit. 'New Days'). The series ran for 11 episodes and was broadcast on Fuji TV from 8 July – 16 September 2008.

==== Episode list ====
Episode	Title	Description
01	Babyfaced Detective's Undercover Operation	Shibata finally became a detective as he always wanted, but his first case is finding a missing girl, "Mizuki Hosho". However, Shibata saw the "Reaper's Hands" on her. Can he find her in time?
02	A Promise... I will jump for you	Shibata's next undercover mission is in a local high school. His mission is to uncover who the real "Onigami" is among the students. However, Yuji Kusunoki, a student, is planting a bomb and forcing Toru Shinjo to bungee jump off the school roof. Could he be the real "Onigami"?
03	Betrayal – I will never forgive you	It turns out that "Onigami" is still not solved. Meanwhile, a student, Hiromi Mura, is having a problem with his old teacher. It is up to Shibata to help Mura and his old teacher, but why does he see the "Reaper's Hands" on Mura?
04	Conclusion – You are a fierce God	Shibata and the other students are locked in an abandoned building on a class trip ordered by "Onigami". After a near death experience, it turns out that the real Onigami is none other than Gakuto Kato. But what is his intention?
05	Moe: Maid Cafe Infiltration	Shibata now finds himself in another undercover mission as a maid waitress to find a missing girl. Meanwhile, Hakuto sees love in Mary-chan, a fellow waitress. However, as sweet and easy going as she seems, she is actually suffering a lot deep down.
06	Revenge... The last tearful confrontation	"Ochiai" is revealed as the one that is pulling the strings behind Mary's decision to suicide. However, he was also responsible for the kidnapping of the missing girls, the death of Shibata's father, and Yuri Chiba, Kujiro's girlfriend and Sakura's sister. Shibata, Kojiro, and Sakura soon find themselves confronting their deepest pain.
07	Devil's Temptation... I will save you by all means	Lately, meth is sold widely throughout Japan in the form of a hard candy. Shibata, with help from Mizuki, tries to find out who's behind this. Along the way, they met an old friend, Rika Machida. But it seems that she is working for the one responsible. Rika soon finds herself in danger. Could Ochiai be behind this?
08	Courage... An escape that is impossible to predict	Rika and Shibata are trapped in an ocean of trees without food or water after being captured and buried alive. Will they make it out? Will Rika get the chance to face her mother?
09	Prison Infiltration... A surprise scheme	Shibata goes undercover into the Juvenile Detention Center to investigate Ochiai's prison connections, but first, he needs to be accepted by the other inmates. Meanwhile, Shibata also runs into Gakuto Kato again.
10	Jailbreak! The team's greatest crisis!	It turns out that Kato was only using the name "Onigami" and the original Onigami is still out there. Mizuki is having trouble coping with Ochiai's continued interference with all of their lives. Shibata successfully broke out of prison with Ino, but when he finally makes it to Ochiai's designated meeting place, he finds that Ochiai is already dead.
11	To our hopes for the future...	Shibata is accused of being Ochiai's murderer. He must find the real culprit. However, the clue that is left behind is a feather matching "Team Shibatora"'s cell phone straps, which means the murderer can only be a member from "Team Shibatora". Could it really be someone so close to Shibata? And who's the real onigami?
Special	Biggest Emergency in History Special	A new Onigami event occurred, the new Onigami intends to use Mizuki as a pawn to prove that the police are wrong. However, Shibata sees the reaper's hand on Mizuki, and what can Shibata do to prevent this.
