= Full Swing (2008 TV series) =

- Country of origin: Japan
- Original language: Japanese
- No. of episodes: 6

Original release
- Network: NHK
- Release: January 19 – February 23, 2008

Full Swing (フルスイング) is a 2008 Japanese television series. It is based on the biography of Michihiro Takabatake, a professional baseball player and coach who became a high-school teacher at the age of 59.

== Cast ==
- Katsumi Takahashi as Michihiro Takabayashi
- Ran Itō as Michiko Takabayashi
- Shohei Kawaguchi as Kōhei Takabayashi
- Katsuya Kobayashi as Kazuma Aragaki
- Kōtarō Satomi as Seiichirō Tendō
- Masato Hagiwara as Ikkyū Abe
- Kazue Fukiishi as Aya Tokitō
- Shinya Tsukamoto as Saburō Ōta

== Awards ==
- Hoso Bunka Foundation Award (Episodes 1 and 4)
