= Yu Yamada =

Japanese model, actress and singer (born 1984)

- 山田 優
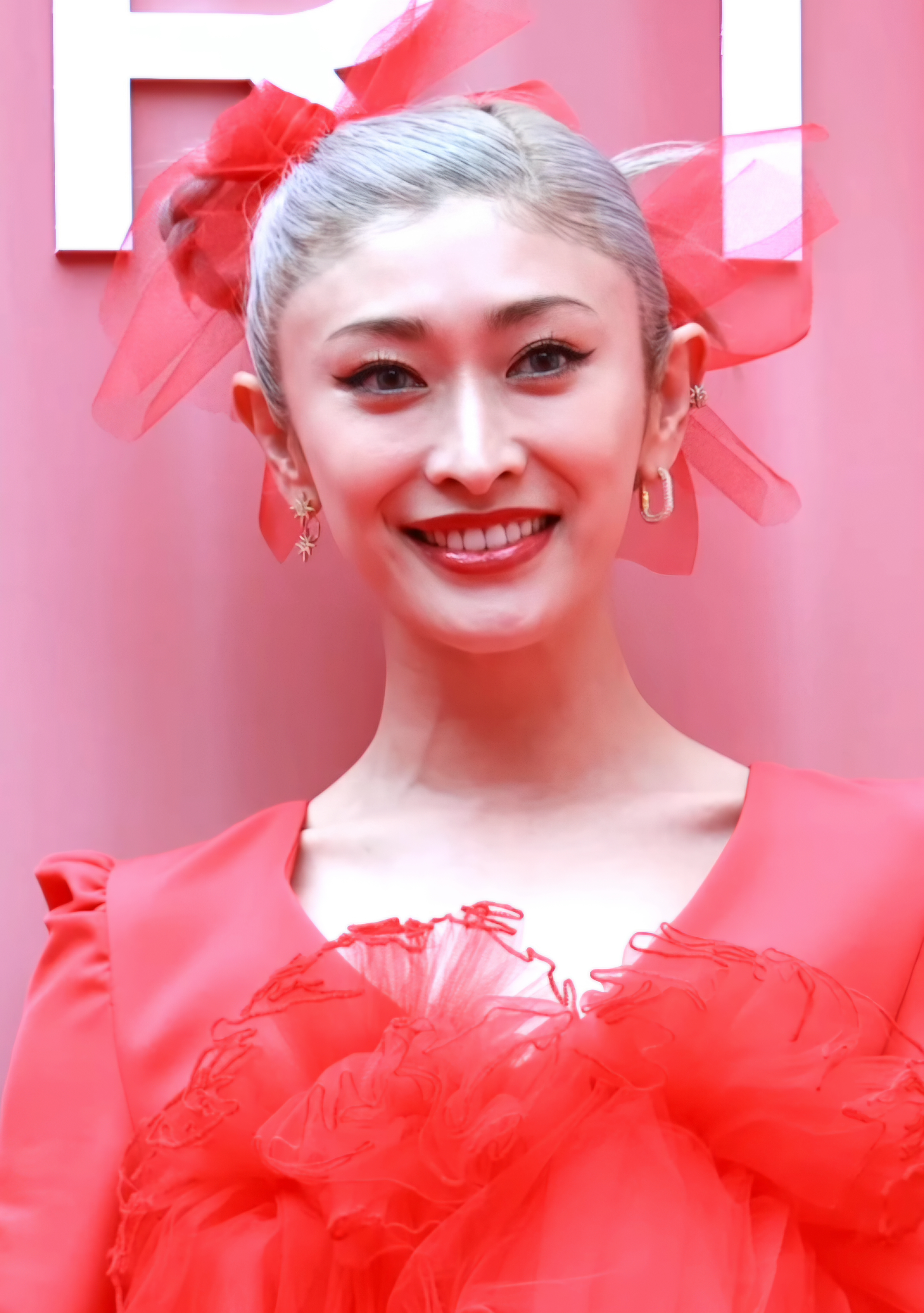
- Yu Yamada in May 2025
- Born: July 5, 1984 (age 42); Onna, Okinawa, Japan
- Occupations: Model; actress; singer; TV personality
- Years active: 1999–present
- Employers: K-Dash; Pony Canyon
- Agent: K-Dash
- Height: 169 cm (5 ft 7 in)
- Spouse: Shun Oguri (m. 2012)
- Children: 4
- Relatives: Shintaro Yamada (brother)
- Website: ameblo.jp/yamada-yu

Yu Yamada (山田 優, Yamada Yū; born July 5, 1984) is a Japanese model, actress and singer best known from her modeling work with CanCam magazine.

== Personal life ==
On March 14, 2012, Yamada married Japanese actor Shun Oguri, and is a mother of four children, the fourth one being born in 2022.

== Discography ==
=== Studio albums ===
Year	Name	Album information	Oricon album chart	Notes
2008	Myusic	Released: May 14, 2008; Label: Pony Canyon; Formats: CD, CD+DVD	38	Includes five singles previously released.

=== Singles ===
Single information	Notes
"Real You": Released: September 20, 2006; Oricon Top 100 weekly peak: 10; From album: Myusic
"Eyes on Me": Released: March 7, 2007; Oricon Top 100 weekly peak: 30; From album: Myusic; Label: Pony Canyon	Yu Yamada and this song featured in a 2007 television advertisement for Sofina Raycious cosmetics.; B-side: "Feel My Heart"; "Eyes on Me" is not to be confused with Faye Wong's song of the same name.
"Fly So High": Released: June 13, 2007; Oricon Top 100 weekly peak: 27; From album: Myusic; Label: Pony Canyon	Ending theme for the TV Tokyo anime series Blue Dragon.; B-side: Little Raindrop
"Fiesta! Fiesta!": Released: September 5, 2007; Oricon Top 100 weekly peak: 47; From album: Myusic; Label: Pony Canyon	Yu Yamada and this song featured in another 2007 television advertisement for Sofina Raycious.; The B-side, "Palm", served as the ending theme to the Fuji TV horseracing show Umanade.; Composed by Toshinobu Kubota.
"Leave All Behind": Released: April 23, 2008	
"My All": Released: January 21, 2009	
"Free": Released: May 20, 2009	Ending theme for the anime series Basquash!

== Filmography ==
=== Movies ===
- Route 58 (2003) as Rin
- Kiseki wa Sora Kara Futte Kuru (2005) as Reiko Aoyama
- Akihabara@Deep (2006) as Akira
- Pulukogi (2007)
- Surf's Up (Japanese dub) (2007) as Lani Aliikai
- Kanna-san Daiseikō Desu! (2008) as Kanna
- Shinjuku Swan (2015) as Ryoko
- Eating Women (2018)

=== Dramas ===
- Kabachitare! (2001)
- Kindaichi Shounen no Jikenbo (2001)
- Kangei Danjiki Goikkou-sama (2001)
- Shiawase no Shippo (2002)
- Cosmetic (2003)
- Aisuru Tame ni Aisaretai Loved to Love (2003)
- Sore wa, Totsuzen, Arashi no youni... (2004)
- Orange Days (2004)
- Be-Bop High School (2004)
- Nihon no Kowai Yoru "Daiseikubi" (2004)
- X'mas Nante Daikirai (2004)
- Tales of Japan (2004)
- Be-Bop High School 2 (2005)
- Fukigen na Gene (2005)
- Yume de Aimashou (2005)
- Yonimo Kimyona Monogatari "Happunkan" (2005)
- Satomi Hakenden (2006)
- Tsubasa no Oreta Tenshitachi "Actress" (2006)
- Zenibana (2006)
- Damens' Walker (2006)
- The Family (2007), Makiko Yasuda
- Zenibana 2 (2007)
- Nodame Cantabile in Europe (2008)
- Gokusen 3 (2008)
- Binbō Danshi (2008)
- Seigi no Mikata (2008)
- Akuma no Temari Uta (2009)
- Mei-chan no Shitsuji (2009)
- Gakeppuchi no Eri (2010)

=== Anime ===
- Paradise Kiss (2005) as Yukari Hayasaka
