= Gakkō ja Oshierarenai! =

- Genre: Romance; Comedy, High School
- Created by: Yukawa Kazuhiko
- Starring: Kyoko Fukada
- Country of origin: Japan
- Original language: Japanese
- No. of episodes: 10 episodes

Production
- Executive producers: Ohira Futoshi, Kuwabara Joya, Inoue Ryuta, Ota Masaharu
- Production location: Japan
- Running time: 54 minutes

Original release
- Network: NTV
- Release: 15 July – 16 September 2008

Gakkō ja Oshierarenai! (学校じゃ教えられない！) is a Japanese television drama series concerning the life of ten high school students. It stars Kyoko Fukada as their teacher. It first aired on July 15, 2008.

== Plot ==
Mai Aida (Kyoko Fukada) is a third year English teacher at an all-girls private school. Since fewer students are enrolling at the school, they decide to accept boys. Five boys start to attend the school. To help them adjust, Mai Aida helps them to come in contact with some girls by creating the "Social Dance Club". However, as the boys and girls at the "Social Dance Club" start to get along with each other and even fall in love, their project is not only threatened by the vice principal, but also by the devious leader of the student's council who has her very own agenda as to why she wants the club to stop.

== Cast ==
- Kyoko Fukada as Aida Mai
- Shosuke Tanihara as Kensaku Himuro, the principal
- Ran Ito as Meiko Kageyama
- Riisa Naka as Eiri Yokoyama
- Aoi Nakamura as Kazuki Mizuki, also known as "Kazu"
- Goki Maeda as Shizuya Narita
- Aki Asakura as Hitomi Kenjou
- Kohei Norizuki as Shintarou Inai
- Mizuki Kato as Rei Suzumura
- Daisuke Yanagisawa as Kiyoshi Nagasaki
- Suzu Natsume as Maho Kameda
- Win Morisaki as Tomu Nishikawa
- Miyu Yagyu as Kana Yoshizawa

Preceded by Osen (22/4/2008 - 24/6/2008)	NTV Tuesdays Drama 火曜ドラマ; Tuesday 22:00 - 22:54 (JST)	Succeeded by Oh! My Girl!! (14/10/2008 - 9/12/2008)
