= Seigi no Mikata =

Japanese manga series

正義の味方
- Manga
- Written by: Chiaki Hijiri
- Published by: Shueisha
- Magazine: Chorus
- Original run: 2004 – 2008
- Volumes: 7
- Television drama
- Directed by: Satoru Nakajima
- Studio: Nihon Television
- Original run: July 9, 2008 – September 10, 2008
- Episodes: 10

Seigi no Mikata (正義の味方; lit. Ally of Justice) is a Japanese manga series published on Shueisha by Chiaki Hijiri. It was adaptated into a short-running TV series in 2008 by Nihon Television, directed by Satoru Nakajima. The series focuses on a 15-year-old girl named Yoko who is tormented by her older sister, Makiko. Only Yoko and her parents know her sister's true nature, while other people are fooled by her unbelievable good luck.

== Plot ==
15-year-old Yoko Nakata is constantly tormented by her self-centered and evil older sister Makiko, who works for a government office after having graduated from a famous university. Despite her ill-tempered nature, Makiko's actions tend to somehow make things better for those around her, causing others to praise her as an "ally of justice". Yoko wants to be free due to her sister's attitude. She decides to get her sister married so she will move out. However, her plan backfires. Riku Okamoto, whose infatuation with Yoko leads him to tease her persistently, eventually becomes one of her closest confidants.

Makiko finally reveals her true nature to her husband, Naoki Yoshikawa, who decides to get divorced. Meanwhile, Riku's close friend, Chika Moriyama, tells Yoko that he is about to move away. Her friends attempt to get Yoko to confess through a live TV program, but just before Yoko is about to confess, her sister storms in and starts yelling at her. Makiko is hauled away by security.

A few days later, Naoki and his parents arrive to talk with Makiko. As the divorce is about to be finalized, Makiko tells everyone that she is pregnant and the divorce is canceled, as they think the only reason she was distant and mean was because she was pregnant. Later, Yoko asks Naoki if he knows that her sister is a demon and Naoki tells Yoko that he likes the "demonic" side because it is her real self. The series ends with Yoko finally talking to Riku before he leaves for Osaka and Makiko giving birth to her baby, whom Yoko eventually becomes the one left caring for.

== Cast ==
- Mirai Shida as Yoko Nakata
- Yu Yamada as Makiko Nakata
- Osamu Mukai as Naoki Yoshikawa
- Kanata Hongō as Riku Okamoto
- Saori Takizawa as Midori Yamashita
- Jingi Irie as Taichi Komori (Janbo)
- Mariya Nishiuchi as Chika Moriyama
- Shizuka Nakamura as Kyoko Komatsu
- Rena Shimura as Mai Shimazaki
- Mieko Ishii Arisa Horita
- Shirō Sano as Goro Nakata
- Yoshiko Tanaka as Haruko Nakata
- Yu Tokui as Koichiro Nogami

== Awards ==
- 58th The Television Drama Academy Awards
  - Best Actress: Mirai Shida
  - Best Supporting Actress: Yu Yamada
