= Bara no nai Hanaya =

Japanish TV Drama

- Also known as: Flower Shop Without a Rose
- Genre: Romance
- Starring: Shingo Katori; Yūko Takeuchi; Shota Matsuda
- Ending theme: Zutto Issho sa (Tatsuro Yamashita)
- Country of origin: Japan
- Original language: Japanese

Production
- Production location: Tokyo
- Running time: 60 min./episode

Original release
- Network: Fuji TV
- Release: January 14, 2008 – March 2008

Flower Shop Without A Rose (薔薇のない花屋, Bara no nai Hanaya) is a Japanese television drama. It was broadcast and produced by Fuji Television. It started with a 22.4% (Kanto Region) rating on January 14, 2008.

== Plot ==
Eiji Shiomi is a florist. He is a single man with a young daughter named Shizuku. One day, he invited a blind woman seeking shelter under his shop awning to come in his shop. A surprising tale gradually unfolds with their budding love, revealing a complex web of lies and dark motives. Nothing is as it seems at first, and each of the characters is burdened with their own painful secrets, but finally resolved with love and kindness.

Episode 1 Flashes of scenes in the past in a hospital. A man, Eiji, running to the emergency room, shocked by what he found out. A clutched rose fell from his hand to the ground. Eiji's wife died while delivering the baby, Shizuku...

At the flower shop, a soaking woman, Mio, is standing under the shelter, sheltering from the rain. Eiji invited her in to get warm, then noticed her appearing to be blind. In order to thank Eiji, Mio insisted in buying something; she demanded a rose, which is the kind of flower not sold in Eiji's shop.

Eiji's daughter Shizuku has been wearing a mask all day long recently. Shizuku's teacher informed Eiji to school and told him that Shizuku was bullied by a kid in the class earlier, and she concerned of Shizuku's wearing the mask. Though Shizuku is popular in the class, they worried about if something had happened to her. Eiji then went visiting her grandma living at the hill, knowing that it is because of that the thoughtful Shizuku didn't want Eiji to suffer from the pain by remember her mother, his passing wife, from seeing Shizuku's resembling face on her coming birthday, which happened to be the date of his wife's death...

Near by the dock, thinking Shizuku might be blaming herself for her mother's death, Eiji told her a different version of the tale "North wind and the sun," that though the sun loves the stranger, it cannot come too close to the stranger or it will hurt him with the flame; that's why the sun decided to look after the stranger from a distance. Shizuku knew that Eiji implies that her passing mother's looking after her in the heaven; she cried and said that Eiji had never scold at her, that he is also like the sun but he is not hurting her at all. They hugged...

== Cast ==
=== Main cast ===
- Shingo Katori as Shiomi Eiji
- Yūko Takeuchi as Mio Shirato
- Yumiko Shaku as Yuki Ono
- Shota Matsuda as Naoya Kudo
- Susumu Terajima as Kengo Shijo
- Junko Ikeuchi as Keiko Hishida
- Tomokazu Miura as Teruo Anzai
- Yuika Motokariya as Shizuku's mother
- Yuki Yagi as Shiomi Shizuku
- Yuki Imai as Shogo Hirota
- Tamayama Tetsuji as Kamiyama Shun

== Episodes ==
	Episode title	Translated title	Broadcast date	Ratings
Ep. 1	北風と太陽	The North Wind and the Sun	January 14, 2008	22.4%
Ep. 2	花のように笑う人	A Smile like a Flower	January 21, 2008	19.0%
Ep. 3	終電までに探して	Find Me Before the Last Train Leaves	January 28, 2008	18.4%
Ep. 4	明かされた過去～3万人の子供たちへ	A Past Revealed: For the 30,000 Children	February 4, 2008	17.2%
Ep. 5	世界一長い告白!	The World's Longest Confession of Love	February 11, 2008	17.7%
Ep. 6	暴かれていく秘密	The Slowly Unveiling Secret	February 18, 2008	16.2%
Ep. 7	親が子供を叩く時	When the Parent Strikes the Child	February 25, 2008	16.5%
Ep. 8	さよなら父ちゃん	Goodbye, Daddy	March 3, 2008	17.8%
Ep. 9	衝撃!全ての真実	Shock! The Whole Truth	March 10, 2008	17.7%
Ep. 10	愛を取り戻すため	Reclaiming the Love That was Once Lost	March 17, 2008	19.4%
Ep. 11	薔薇を売る花屋～涙の一滴（しずく）…	The Flower Shop that Sells Roses ~ Teardrop(Shizuku)...	March 24, 2008	22.1%
Average Rating: 18.6% (kanto region)

== Theme Song ==
- Zutto Issho sa (Together Forever) by Tatsuro Yamashita
