= Miki Maya =

Japanese actress (born 1964)

- 真矢みき (真矢ミキ)
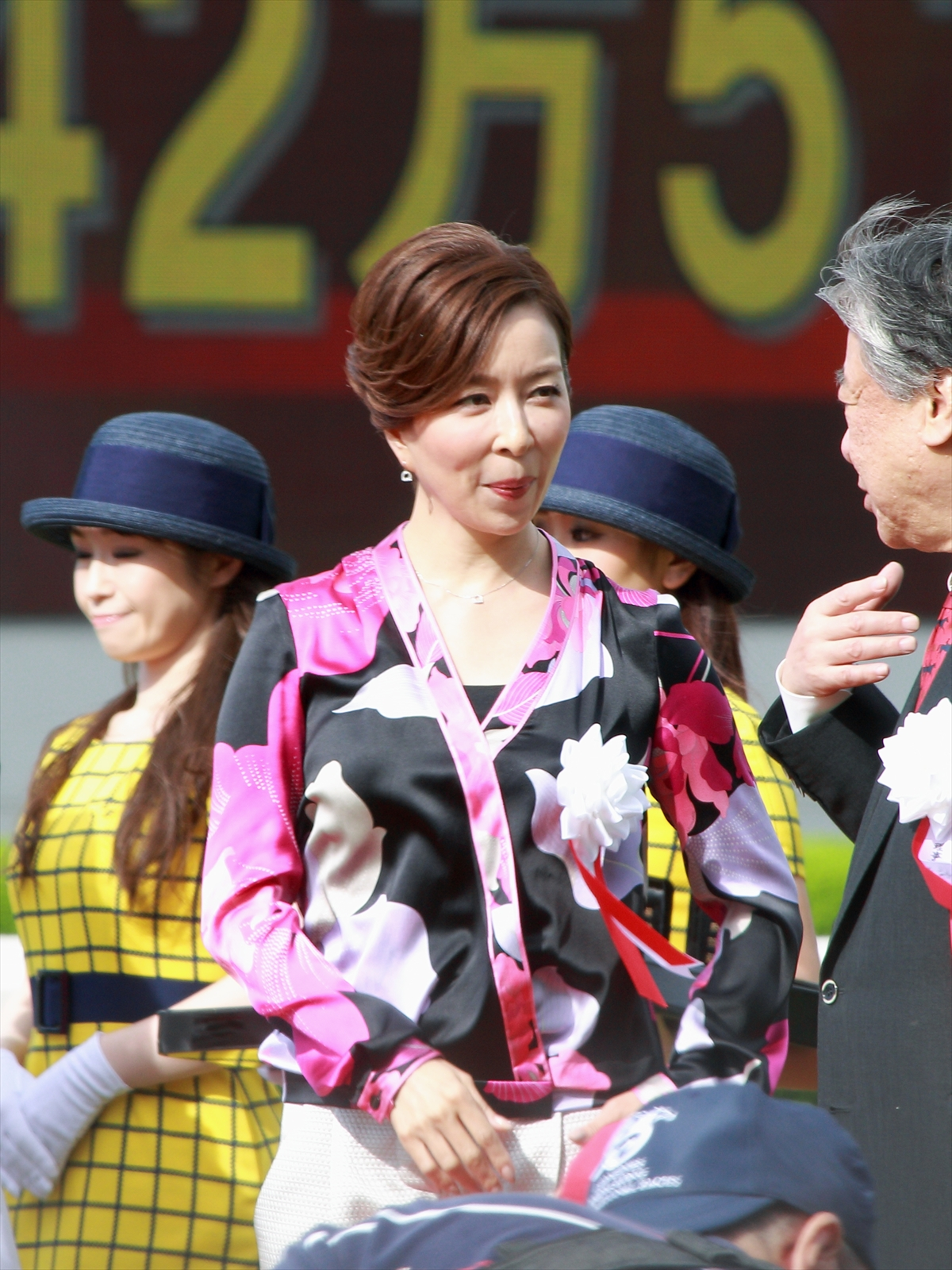
- Maya at 56th Takarazuka Kinen
- Born: Miki Sato; January 31, 1964 (age 62); Hiroshima, Hiroshima, Japan
- Years active: 1981–present
- Spouse: Nishijima Kazuhiro (married 2009-present)

Miki Maya (真矢みき, Maya Miki; born January 31, 1964 in Hiroshima, Hiroshima Prefecture) is a Japanese actress and former top star of the Takarazuka Revue. Her real name is Miki Sato (佐藤美季, Satō Miki).

== Career ==
=== Takarazuka Revue ===
Maya entered the Takarazuka musical school at the age of 15, and joined the Takarazuka Revue Company in 1981 with the debut performance Takarazuka Haru no Odori. She became the top star of the Flower Troupe for her role in East Of Eden in 1995.

Maya was immensely popular as a top star, and in 1998, she became the first Takarasienne to hold a concert in the iconic Budokan venue. She retired in 1998 after her last show 'Speakeasy', based on the John Gay ballad opera The Beggar's Opera, in which she sang the theme song Kaze no machi no junjō na akutō tachi (風の街の純情な男たち).

Career after Takarazuka

Since her graduation from Takarazuka Revue, she has enjoyed popularity as a drama, stage and movie actress and has acted in various dramas including "Himitsu no Hanazono", "Kaze no Haruka" and "Attention Please". She has also shot commercials for Wella, Hagen Daz and Kikkoman, among others.

In 2008, she returned to the stage with Chariteau Versailles to commemorate her 10th year after leaving the Takarazuka stage.

Maya has also found success appearing in commercials for products such as instant ramen and laxative vegetable juices. In November 2011, Maya was mentioned prominently in media reports surrounding controversy over a brand she promoted, a facial soap called Cha no Shizuku. The soap, produced by Yuuka, since 2009 has produced severe allergic reactions 471 consumers, with 66 of those hospitalized. The media speculated that because Maya had personally recommended the soap, claiming health benefits, she might be one of those potentially held liable for the damages caused to the soap's victims.

== Personal life ==
In 2009, she married ballet dancer, Nishijima Kazuhiro. The wedding ceremony took place on April 2009 at the famous Meiji Jingu Shrine, where she and her husband were surrounded by the press and their fans.

== Trivia ==
- Her concert, "Miki In Budokan", had a sell-out crowd of 30,000 in just 2 days.
- She is the first Takarasienne to have a solo photo book shot by Kishin Shinoyama, called "Guy".
- Miki Maya and Mira Anju, nicknamed "YanMiki", are one of the most famous otokoyaku (male role) duos to date. Their dynamic featured in the 1986 Bow Hall performance "Goodbye Peppermint Night" and was popular with fans throughout Anju's Top Star era (1992-1995). Maya and Anju reunited on stage in 1997 "Goodbye Tokyo Takarazuka", 2004 Takarazuka 90th Anniversary, and 2014 Takarazuka 100th Anniversary.
- She is the only Takarasienne to appear in NHK's Top Runner series in December 1997.
- Her other talents include Japanese dance and baton work.

== Filmography ==
=== Television ===
- Downtown Rocket (2015–18), Saya Izumi
- What Will You Do, Ieyasu? (2023), Tomoe
- Tokyo Vice (2024), Shoko Nagata

=== Film ===
- Bayside Shakedown 2 (2003), Superintendent Hitomi Okita
- December (2023), Kazumi Okamoto
- Once Upon a Crime (2023), Isabella
- 90 Years Old – So What? (2024), Kyoko Sugiyama
- Angry Squad: The Civil Servant and the Seven Swindlers (2024), Ruriko Igarashi
- Shinji Muroi: Not Defeated (2024), Hitomi Okita
- Shinji Muroi: Stay Alive (2024), Hitomi Okita
- Goodbye My Car (2026), Akiko Kimura
- Bayside Shakedown: N.E.W (2026), Hitomi Okita

=== Japanese dub ===
- Hachi: A Dog's Tale (2009), Cate Wilson (Joan Allen)
- Godzilla x Kong: The New Empire (2024), Hampton (Rachel House)

Preceded by Mira Anju	Top Star (Otokoyaku) for Flower Troupe; 1995-1998	Succeeded by Mire Aika
