= Kami no Shizuku (TV series) =

- Promotional image featuring Kazuya Kamenashi
- Genre: Drama, Comedy
- Written by: Yūsuke Watanabe
- Directed by: Satoru Nakajima
- Starring: Kamenashi Kazuya; Tanabe Seiichi; Naka Riisa; Yuki Uchida
- Country of origin: Japan
- Original language: Japanese
- No. of series: 1
- No. of episodes: 9

Original release
- Network: NTV
- Release: January 13 – March 10, 2009

Kami no Shizuku (神の雫) is a Japanese television comedy series, based on the manga series Drops of God. Produced by Nippon TV and featuring Kazuya Kamenashi, Seiichi Tanabe, Riisa Naka, Nozomi Sasaki, and Yuki Uchida, it was first broadcast on January 13, 2009, running until March 10, 2009. In the Nikkan Sports Drama Grand Prix Winter 2009 Awards, the series received awards in four of the main categories.

== Cast ==
=== Main ===
- Kazuya Kamenashi as Shizuku Kanzaki
- Seiichi Tanabe as Issei Tōmine
- Riisa Naka as Miyabi Shinohara
- Yuki Uchida as Maki Saionji
- Naho Toda as Ryōko Kiryū
- Nozomi Sasaki as Sara
- Naoto Takenaka as Robert Toi

=== Guest ===
- Yuika Motokariya as Suzuka Watanuki
- Ai Kato as Kaori Mizusawa
- Kenta Satoi
- Denden
- Hiroko Yamashita

Preceded by Oh! My Girl!! (October 14, 2008 - December 9, 2008)	NTV Tuesdays Drama 火曜ドラマ; Tuesday 22:00 - 22:54 (JST)	Succeeded by Program ended
