= List of My Absolute Boyfriend episodes =

My Absolute Boyfriend (Korean: 절대 그이; RR: Jeoldae geui) is a South Korean television series created for SBS, based on the Japanese manga series of the same name. The romantic comedy drama series is produced by Apollo Pictures and iHQ, with Yeo Jin-goo, Bang Min-ah and Hong Jong-hyun as the main characters, and Jung Jung-hwa serving as director. It tells the story of a special effects makeup artist who has never had much success with love, and a humanoid robot built to become the ideal boyfriend.

During the course of the series, 36 episodes of My Absolute Boyfriend aired on SBS TV, while 40 episodes were released internationally. Depending on territory, the episodic guide below may differ.

== Episodes ==
No.	Title	Original release date	Viewers (millions) (Note: Rating is based on South Korean viewers percentage by AGB Nielsen)
1	"Episode 1"	May 15, 2019	2.1%
2	"Episode 2"	May 15, 2019	2.4%
3	"Episode 3"	May 16, 2019	3.1%
4	"Episode 4"	May 16, 2019	3.5%
5	"Episode 5"	May 22, 2019	2.6%
6	"Episode 6"	May 22, 2019	3.0%
7	"Episode 7"	May 23, 2019	2.9%
8	"Episode 8"	May 23, 2019	3.0%
9	"Episode 9"	May 29, 2019	2.5%
10	"Episode 10"	May 29, 2019	2.7%
11	"Episode 11"	May 30, 2019	2.9%
12	"Episode 12"	May 30, 2019	2.7%
13	"Episode 13"	June 5, 2019	2.3%
14	"Episode 14"	June 5, 2019	2.7%
15	"Episode 15"	June 6, 2019	3.4%
16	"Episode 16"	June 6, 2019	3.1%
17	"Episode 17"	June 12, 2019	1.8%
18	"Episode 18"	June 12, 2019	1.8%
19	"Episode 19"	June 13, 2019	3.2%
20	"Episode 20"	June 13, 2019	2.9%
21	"Episode 21"	June 19, 2019	2.0%
22	"Episode 22"	June 19, 2019	2.5%
23	"Episode 23"	June 20, 2019	3.1%
24	"Episode 24"	June 20, 2019	2.6%
25	"Episode 25 (Note: Episodic guide may differ for the South Korean version.)"	June 26, 2019	1.8%
26	"Episode 26"	June 26, 2019	2.2%
27	"Episode 27"	June 27, 2019	2.8%
28	"Episode 28"	June 27, 2019	2.3%
29	"Episode 29"	July 3, 2019	1.5%
30	"Episode 30"	July 3, 2019	1.7%
31	"Episode 31"	July 4, 2019	2.7%
32	"Episode 32"	July 4, 2019	2.4%
33	"Episode 33"	July 10, 2019	N/A
34	"Episode 34"	July 10, 2019	N/A
35	"Episode 35"	July 11, 2019	N/A
36	"Episode 36"	July 11, 2019	N/A
37	"Episode 37"	July 11, 2019	-
38	"Episode 38"	July 11, 2019	-
39	"Episode 39"	July 11, 2019	-
40	"Finale"	July 11, 2019	-

== See also ==
- My Absolute Boyfriend
- Absolute Boyfriend (manga)
