= Angel Heart (disambiguation) =

Angel Heart is a 1987 horror movie, written and directed by Alan Parker.

Angel Heart may also refer to:

- Angel Heart, a Japanese media franchise:
  - Angel Heart (manga), comic series by Tsukasa Hōjō
  - Angel Heart (anime), animated television series
  - Angel Heart (2015 TV series), a live-action Japanese drama series based on the manga by Tsukasa Hōjō
- Angel Heart (Bonnie Tyler album), 1992 release by singer Bonnie Tyler
- Angel Heart (Jimmy Webb album), 1982 release by the American songwriter, and its title song
