= Kensei Mikami =

Japanese actor (born 1984)

- 水上 剣星
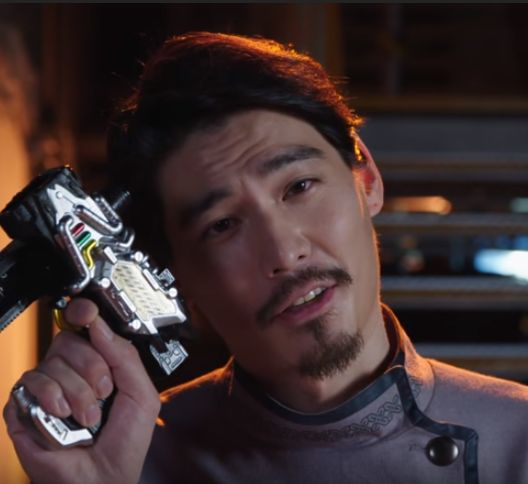
- As Gentoku Himuro in Kamen Rider Build
- Born: 2 April 1984 (age 42); Tokyo, Japan
- Occupation: Actor
- Years active: 2009–present
- Agent: Ken-On
- Notable work: Beck
- Television: Tokyo Dogs; Kamen Rider Build
- Spouse: Maho Nonami (m. 2012)
- Children: 2
- Website: Kensei Mikami Official Site

Kensei Mikami (水上 剣星, Mikami Kensei; born 2 April 1984 in Tokyo) is a Japanese actor. After being active as a fashion model in Japan, he went to New York at the age of 18. After returning home, he started work as an actor. While he has appeared in numerous television dramas and films, he was also appointed to represent various brands as a model. He also launched his own children's brand "himher" He is represented by the agency Ken-On. His wife is actress Maho Nonami.

== Biography ==
He made his drama debut in Tokyo Dogs in October 2009. After that, he appeared in drama series in eight consecutive seasons.

He later made his film debut in Beck released in 2010.

He married the actress Maho Nonami on 9 December 2012. Their first child, a girl, was born in 2013. Their second daughter was born in 2015.

== Filmography ==
=== TV dramas ===
Year	Title	Role	Notes	Ref.
2015	Masshiro	Masato Komura		
2015	37.5°C Tears	Yuki Sugisaki		
2017	Kamen Rider Build	Gentoku Himuro		
2019	Nippon Noir Detective Y's rebellion	Ryuji Igami		

=== Films ===
Year	Title	Role	Notes	Ref.
2010	Beck	Eiji Kimura		
2017	Peach Girl	Ryo Okayasu		
2018	That Girl's Captives of Love	Sakai		
2020	Project Dream: How to Build Mazinger Z's Hangar	Dessler		
