= Absolute Boyfriend (Japanese TV series) =

Japanese television series

- Promotional poster for Absolute Boyfriend

Japanese name
- Kanji: 絶対彼氏 〜完全無欠の恋人ロボット〜
- Literal meaning: Absolute boyfriend: Completely flawless lover robot
Transcriptions
- Revised Hepburn: Zettai Kareshi: Kanzen Muketsu no Koibito Robotto
- Genre: Romance, comedy
- Based on: Absolute Boyfriend by Yuu Watase
- Developed by: Takuya Kanai
- Screenplay by: Rika Nezu
- Directed by: Masato Hijikata (土方政人) (episodes 1–2, 5, 8, 11); Genta Satō (佐藤源太) (episodes 3–4, 7, 10); Manabu Kitagawa (北川学) (episodes 6, 9)
- Starring: Mocomichi Hayami; Hiro Mizushima; Saki Aibu
- Ending theme: "Okaeri" by Ayaka
- Composers: Yuko Fukushima; Audio Highs
- Country of origin: Japan
- Original language: Japanese
- No. of episodes: 12

Production
- Producer: Fumi Hashimoto (橋本芙美)
- Running time: 54 minutes
- Production companies: Fuji TV; Kyodo Television

Original release
- Network: Fuji Television
- Release: April 15, 2008 – March 24, 2009

Related
- Absolute Darling (Taiwan); My Absolute Boyfriend (South Korea)

Absolute Boyfriend (絶対彼氏 〜完全無欠の恋人ロボット〜, Zettai Kareshi: Kanzen Muketsu no Koibito Robotto; lit. "Absolute boyfriend: Completely flawless lover robot") is a Japanese romantic comedy television drama series based on the original manga by Yuu Watase.

== Synopsis ==
Riiko Izawa is an office lady in search of a boyfriend, and she ends up in possession of a "robot" known as Night Tenjo, who is programmed to be the perfect boyfriend. However, this creates a love triangle with a distinguished young man at her company who also has feelings for her. Riiko is played by Saki Aibu, Night is played by Mocomichi Hayami, and Soshi Asamoto is played by Hiro Mizushima.

== Cast ==
- Mocomichi Hayami as Night Tenjo
- Hiro Mizushima as Soshi Asamoto
- Saki Aibu as Riiko Izawa
- Nobuo Kyo as Ishizeki
- Eisuke Sasai as Yuki Shirasagi
- Natsuhi Ueno as Mika Ito
- Kenta Satoi as Hajime Hirata
- Tsubaki Nekoze as Kyoko Adachi
- Maki Komoto as Nozomi Sato
- Masaki Kaji as Yoichiro Tanaka
- Meikyo Yamada as Shiro Asamoto
- Rie Minemura as Tetsuko Yoshioka
- Erena as Chiho Ono
- Ryosuke Sakuragi as Yasushi Morikawa
- Shoichi Watanuki as Takeru Dei
- Jingi Irie as Kota Hayashi
- Kei Yamamoto as Kazushi Asamoto
- Shunsuke Nakamura as Masashi Asamoto
- Kuranosuke Sasaki as Gaku Namikiri
- Miki Maya as Fujiko Wakabayashi

== Special ==
On March 24, 2009, a special episode of this series was broadcast, set three years after the previous episode. Riiko had become a patissier and is engaged to Soshi Asamoto, and Night was suddenly revived by a Kronos Heaven employee, who wanted to use his individual ego to her own gain. At the end of this special episode, Night is last seen telling Namikiri to erase him from this world and shedding tears. Riiko, at last, returns to Soshi's side and their marriage goes on, but not shown on screen.

- Viewership ratings: 9.0 (Kanto)
- Broadcast date: March 24, 2009
- Air time: Tuesday 21:00-23:00

== Release ==
The series was released on DVD in Japan on November 5, 2008. Although it was broadcast in 1080i, it was not released on Blu-ray. The DVD release does not have any subtitles.

The series was released internationally, with subtitles in English and other languages, on Viki on December 21, 2021, over 13 years since it was broadcast in Japan. It was also released in Northern America only, with English subtitles, on AsianCrush.
