= Black Butler (film) =

- Film poster
- Directed by: Kentarō Ōtani; Keiichi Satō
- Written by: Tsutomu Kuroiwa
- Based on: Black Butler by Yana Toboso
- Produced by: Shinzo Matsuhashi
- Starring: Hiro Mizushima; Ayame Goriki
- Cinematography: Terukuni Ajisaka
- Edited by: Tsuyoshi Imai
- Music by: Akihisa Matsuura
- Production companies: Warner Bros. Pictures Japan; C&I Entertainment; Rockworks; Avex Entertainment; Square Enix; A Station; GyaO; East Japan Marketing & Communications Inc.; Tokyu Recreation
- Distributed by: Warner Bros. Pictures Japan
- Release date: January 18, 2014 (Japan)
- Running time: 119 minutes
- Country: Japan
- Language: Japanese
- Box office: $5.8 million

Black Butler (Japanese: 黒執事, Hepburn: Kuroshitsuji) is a 2014 Japanese period-style action fantasy film directed by Kentarō Ōtani and Keiichi Satō. The film is based on the manga of the same name by Yana Toboso.

== Plot ==
The film is set in a quasi-Victorian history. The world contains two major powers: the West, ruled by the Queen, and the East. The Queen manipulates events worldwide using operatives called the Queen's Watchdogs. Earl Kiyohara Genpou (replacing Ciel Phantomhive from the original manga and anime), is a Queen's Watchdog in an unnamed Eastern metropolis. To the world, she presents herself as male in order to keep a hold on the Genpou family's Funtom Toy Company fortune, as it is only passed down to males of the family, and Kiyohara is now an orphan. Her right-hand man is Sebastian Michaelis, a demon who masquerades as her butler, to whom she sold her soul in order to take revenge against her family's massacre. Also in her household are clumsy maid Rin and house steward Tanaka.

Currently, Kiyohara is investigating a case in which powerful citizens are found mummified and desiccated. The latest victim is the Queen's ambassador Anthony Campelle. At the Eastern Ministry for State Security, a senior official tells policeman Tokizawa that if a Queen's Watchdog exists, they are a threat to the nation and should be disposed of but was warn that getting rid of the Watchdogs would be dangerous. Tokizawa learns that the Genpous were once called the Phantomhives from England before they moved to Japan and changed their family name to Genpou.

Clues lead Kiyohara and Sebastian to an underground club of the wealthy. The Earl infiltrates the club with Rin but they are captured by Kujo, CEO of Epsilon Pharmaceuticals. Kujo talks with a hooded figure about Necrosis, a poisonous new drug. Party guests inhale Necrosis; a bound Kiyohara watches as they begin bleeding from their faces and desiccation sets in. Seeing that the drug is ready, the hooded figure kills Kujo and leaves. Sebastian rescues the Earl and Rin.

It is revealed that Kiyohara's aunt is the hooded figure who killed Kujo, had a hand in killing the Earl's parents, and is the bio-terrorist who will kill innocent people with a Necrosis bomb. She is doing it for eternal youth and as revenge against the Earl's father choosing her sister (the Earl's mother) over her. Sebastian tricks her aunt into succumbing to Necrosis.

The Earl disarms the bomb and Sebastian treats her Necrosis exposure with the antidote. Tokizawa receives a box; in it are the remaining Necrosis capsules and a note that the terrorist danger has been dispelled and the Genpou family are not his enemies. Meanwhile, the senior official from the Eastern Ministry for State Security is notified that the Earl is alive and well; it is revealed that the senior official is a member of the crime syndicate that killed the Earl's parents.

Sebastian puts the Earl to bed. She orders him to never betray her and asks him to stay with her until she falls asleep. As he does so, she sees in him the vision of her father, and smiles for the first time.

== Cast ==
- Hiro Mizushima as Sebastian Michaelis, the "Black Butler"
- Ayame Goriki as Earl Kiyohara Genpou (Genpō Shiori), the Queen's Watchdog
- Yūka as Wakatsuki Hanae, Shiori's aunt
- Mizuki Yamamoto as Rin/Lyn, the housemaid
- Tomomi Maruyama as Akashi, the house steward
- Masato Ibu as Kuzo Shinpei
- Takuro Ono as Matsumiya Takaki
- Yu Shirota as Charles Bennett Sato

== Production ==
The film changes the setting of the original manga which was set in 19th-century London to an unnamed Eastern nation in the year 2020. The film stars Mizushima Hiro as Sebastian the lead, his first starring role in three years.

== Release ==
Black Butler was released in Japan on January 18, 2014. The film debuted at third place on its opening weekend in the Japanese Box office being beaten by Trick The Movie: Last Stage and The Eternal Zero. The film grossed a total of ¥601 million ($5,672,766) in Japan, and $98,848 in other Asian territories, for a total of $5,771,614 in Asia.

== Reception ==
Derek Elley of Film Business Asia gave the film a three out of ten rating calling it "a failure at every level", noting that the film was "stodgily directed, appallingly constructed (with an especially confusing exposition) and laden down with yards of flat dialogue. When any action does finally come, it's just so-so.". The Guardian gave the film three stars out of five, noting that "Much of the dialogue and performances are stilted, but as a kitsch cult watch it has its charms." The Times awarded the film three stars out of five, describing it as "compellingly weird".

== See also ==
- List of films based on manga
