= Mr. Brain =

Japanese television drama

- Genre: drama, mystery, comedy
- Written by: Mitsuharu Makita, Yoshiko Morishita
- Directed by: Katsuo Fukuzawa, Yuichiro Hirakawa, Daisuke Yamamuro
- Starring: Takuya Kimura
- Opening theme: "Jump" by Van Halen
- Composer: Yugo Kanno
- Country of origin: Japan
- No. of episodes: 8

Production
- Producers: Akihiko Ishimaru, Hidenori Iyoda

Original release
- Network: TBS
- Release: 23 May – 11 July 2009

Mr. Brain is a Japanese television drama broadcast by TBS from 23 May to 11 July 2009.

== Synopsis ==
Ryusuke Tsukumo is a neuroscientist working for the National Research Institute of Police Science. Tsukumo tackles the nation's most baffling crimes and scandals, going head-to-head with criminal minds. But his eccentricities and poor social timing also aggravates people and circumstances, further complicating matters.

== Cast ==
- Takuya Kimura as Ryusuke Tsukumo
- Haruka Ayase as Kazune Yuri
- Hiro Mizushima as Toranosuke Hayashida
- Sei Hiraizumi as Junpei Funaki
- Osamu Shitara as Junichi Kanda
- Shigenori Yamazaki as Koichi Ochi
- Shiho as Mariko
- Yukina Kinoshita as the cleaning lady
- Shunya Isaka as Katsumi Namikoshi
- Yasufumi Hayashi as Kiyoshi Iwabuchi
- Katsuya Kobayashi as Ippei Seta
- Yuji Tanaka as Mitsuo Natsume
- Tortoise Matsumoto as Jotaro Nanba
- Mao Daichi as Miharu Sasa
- Teruyuki Kagawa as Tomomi Tanbara

== Ratings ==
In the tables below, the blue numbers represent the lowest ratings and the red numbers represent the highest ratings.

Episode #	Original broadcast date	Kanton region
1	January 16, 2009	24.8%
2	January 23, 2009	22.0%
3	January 30, 2009	16.3%
4	February 6, 2009	21.0%
5	February 13, 2009	18.5%
6	February 20, 2009	18.9%
7	February 27, 2009	18.6%
8	March 6, 2009	20.7%
Average		20.5%

Preceded by Godhand Teru (TV Series) (11/4/2009 - 16/5/2009)	TBS Monday 8pm Serial Dramas 土曜8時枠の連続ドラマ; Mondays 21:00 - 21:54 (JST)	Succeeded by Kochira Katsushika-ku Kameari Koen-mae Hashutsujo (1/8/2009 - 26/9/2009)
