= Aya Okamoto =

Japanese actress and voice actress (born 1982)

- Born: December 9, 1982 (age 43); Tokyo, Japan
- Occupation: Actress
- Years active: 1991–2007

Aya Okamoto (岡本綾, Okamoto Aya; born December 9, 1982) is a Japanese actress.

== Filmography ==
- School Ghost Stories (1995) as Kaori Komuro
- Ogyā (2002) Hana
- Azumi (2003) Yae
- Munraito jierifisshu (2004) Minamida Keiko
- Metasequoia no ki no shita de (2005) Okamoto Sachiko
- Metro ni notte (2006) Karube Michiko

== TV drama ==
- Gakkō no kaidan: Haru no tatari special (1999)
- Ringu: Saishūshō (1999), as Ooishi Tomoko
- Ōdorī (Audrey オードリー) (2001-2002), asadora
- Hontoni atta kowai hanashi (2004)
- Engine (2005) as Suenaga Tamaki
- Brother Beat (2005) as Aki & Rie Yoshihara

== Voice roles ==
- Tokyo Godfathers (2003) Miyuki
