= Ken-On =

Japanese talent management company

Ken-On Group (研音グループ, Ken'on Gurūpu) is a talent management company in Japan. It was founded in October 1979. It is located in Roppongi.

== Subsidiaries ==
- Ken-On Incorporated
- Ken Kikaku Incorporated
- MC Cabin Music Publishing
- RAD Japan
- Taisuke Management
- Pin-ups Artists

== Actors ==
=== Female ===
- Yūki Amami
- Nana Eikura
- Haruka Fukuhara
- Sachie Hara
- Yui Ichikawa
- Misaki Ito
- Miho Kanno
- Haruna Kawaguchi
- Tomoka Kurokawa
- Riko Narumi
- Hiyori Sakurada
- Yuki Shibamoto
- Mirai Shida
- Hana Sugisaki
- Mayuko Takata
- Honoka Yahagi
- Tomoko Yamaguchi
- Ai Yoshikawa
- Naomi Zaizen
- Rio Asumi
- Myra Arai
- Marika Matsumoto

=== Male ===
- Ikki Sawamura
- Sota Fukushi
- Takashi Sorimachi
- Toshiaki Karasawa
- Yūta Furukawa
- Shuhei Uesugi
- Mokomichi Hayami
- Ikusaburo Yamazaki
- Jingi Irie
- Asahi Ito
- Ryo Ryusei
- Kouta Nomura

== Voice actors ==
- Yuka Ozaki
- Mamoru Miyano

== Musical artists ==
- Hanae
- Ken Hirai (Pin-ups talent)
- Leo Ieiri
- Spyair
- Superfly
- Ulfuls

=== Jointly managed groups and artists ===
- Funkist (with Powerplay Management)
- Kobukuro (with Minosuke Office Kobukuro)
- Tetsuya Kanmuri (with Powerplay Management)
- Uverworld (with Powerplay Management)
- Exile (with LDH)

== Former talents ==
- Ayaka (under a stAtion)
- Makiko Esumi
- Nanami Hinata
- Rosa Kato
- Tomoko Kawase (under NinetyOne)
- Shota Matsuda
- Hiro Mizushima (under a stAtion)
- Hatsune Okumura
- Nana Katase
