= Tokyo Dogs =

- Genre: Police, crime, romance, comedy
- Written by: Yuichi Fukuda
- Starring: See below
- Opening theme: "Futatsu no Kuchibiru" by Exile (ending theme)
- Country of origin: Japan
- Original language: Japanese
- No. of series: 1
- No. of episodes: 10

Production
- Producer: Tsugi Shikanai
- Production location: Tokyo

Original release
- Network: Fuji TV
- Release: October 19 – December 21, 2009

Tokyo Dogs (東京DOGS, Tōkyō DOGS), sometimes styled as Tôkyô Dogs, is a Fuji TV Japanese television drama, which stars Shun Oguri, Hiro Mizushima and Yuriko Yoshitaka.

== Synopsis ==
So Takakura (Oguri) witnessed his father's murder at a young age. Pledging to catch the killer, he grows up to become an elite cop in New York City, where the criminal lives. Previously he was a soldier in the U.S. Army Special Forces, accounting for some of his military attitude and unconventional aptitudes.

His character is cool-headed and disciplined, yet adapts well. Because of major drug dealings, he gets sent to Tokyo to conduct a joint investigation with the Japanese police. There, he gets teamed up with Maruo Kudo (Mizushima), a detective from a special investigative division.

Kudo is a hot-blooded fighting expert due to his earlier days as a delinquent, but he makes a strong impression with his stylish appearance and is always interested in going on group dates. His personality, interests, and investigation methods are completely mismatched with Takakura's, but the two somehow work together to crack the case they have been given.

With the appearance of a woman who apparently lost all her memories yet seemed to be greatly linked to the murderer of Takakura's father, the story of the worst, yet the best, partnership between the New York elite and the Japanese detective begins...

== Cast ==
- Shun Oguri as So Takakura
- Hiro Mizushima as Maruo Kudo
- Yuriko Yoshitaka as Yuki Matsunaga
- Ryo Katsuji as Keiichi Horikawa
- Mikihisa Azuma as Mashiko Reiji
- Kotaro Shiga as Mitsuo Suzuki
- Asami Usuda as Maki Tanaka
- Rie Tomosaka as Yuri Nishioka
- Kensei Mikami as Hiroto Kaizaki
- Hiroshi Yazaki as Shigeo Kamata
- Haruna Kawaguchi as Karin Takakura
- Takuya Yoshimura as Shota Nakatani
- Yoshiko Tanaka as Kyoko Takakura
- Nene Otsuka as Misa Maijima
- Tomokazu Miura as Kozo Otomo
- Takeru Shibuya as So Young
- Manami Bunya as Yuki Young
- Tôru Nakamura as Jinno Kyosuke

Preceded by Buzzer Beat	Fuji TV Getsuku Drama; October 19, 2009 – December, 2009	Succeeded by Code Blue: Season 2
