= Buzzer Beat =

- Buzzer Beat logo
- ブザー・ビート~崖っぷちのヒーロー
- Genre: Romance, sports
- Starring: See below
- Opening theme: Ichibu to Zenbu by B'z
- Country of origin: Japan
- Original language: Japanese
- No. of series: 1
- No. of episodes: 11

Production
- Producer: Nakano Toshiyuki
- Production location: Tokyo

Original release
- Network: Fuji TV
- Release: July 13 – September 21, 2009

Buzzer Beat (ブザー・ビート~崖っぷちのヒーロー, Buzā Bīto~Gakeppuchi no Hero) is a Fuji TV Japanese television drama starring Tomohisa Yamashita, Keiko Kitagawa, and Saki Aibu.

The series primarily focuses on two characters, Naoki Kamiya (Tomohisa Yamashita), a professional basketball player, and Riko Shirakawa (Keiko Kitagawa), an aspiring violinist. Throughout the series, Naoki faces difficulties trying to succeed in the world of basketball, and Riko struggles to become a successful violinist. Eventually, the two meet, and the series chronicles their relationship and struggles, as well as those of their friends.

== Cast ==
- Tomohisa Yamashita as Kamiya Naoki
- Keiko Kitagawa as Shirakawa Riko
- Saki Aibu as Nanami Natsuki
- Shihori Kanjiya as Ebina Mai
- Hideaki Itō as Coach Kawasaki Tomoya
- Nobuaki Kaneko as Yoyogi Ren
- Junpei Mizobata as Hatano Shuji
- Munetaka Aoki as Moriguchi Shuto
- Satoshi Kanada as Kasukabe Yoshio
- Akiyoshi Kawashima as Matsuyama Ryosuke
- Masaru Nagai as Utsunomiya Toru
- Miki Maya as Kamiya Makiko
- Aya Ōmasa as Kamiya Yuri
- Ayaka Komatsu as Kanazawa Shion
- David M. as Larry Brown (JC ARCS' Foreign Player)
- Hakura Kuroki as Fukuda Seiko
- Keisuke Kato as Oze Yoichi
- Takaki Ishida as Saga Hiroaki
- Yumi Sugimoto as Akita Saori
- Ayana as Kaori Saeki (JC ARCS' Photographer)
- Yasuyuki Maekawa as Yusuke Mishima
- Chisun as Kamiya Yukino
- Ryuta Kawabata as Yusuke Komaki
- Natsumi Ohira as Yuri's friend

Preceded by Konkatsu!	Fuji TV Getsuku Drama; July 13, 2009 – September 21, 2009	Succeeded by Tokyo DOGS
