= Jingi Irie =

Japanese actor (born 1993)

- 入江 甚儀
- Born: 18 May 1993 (age 32); Tokyo, Japan
- Occupation: Actor
- Years active: 2008–present
- Agent: Ken-On
- Television: Absolute Boyfriend; Kingyo Club
- Website: Official website

Jingi Irie (入江 甚儀, Irie Jingi; born 18 May 1993, in Tokyo) is a Japanese actor. He is represented with Ken-On. He graduated from Horikoshi High School. He is a member of Men On Style.

== Biography ==
In December 2007, when he was a second grade junior high school student, inspired by actors in the entertainment industry in his generation such as Ryunosuke Kamiki and Mirai Shida, Irie applied for the Ken-On Group newcomer audition, and passed.

While joining his office in January 2008, he decided to make regular appearances in Absolute Boyfriend (Fuji Television) three days later, while his character was eighteen years old, four years older than his actual age (at the time), and made his acting debut as Kota Hayashi. Irie later appeared in dramas (Absolute Boyfriend, Seigi no Mikata, Oh! My Girl!!) keeping his "3 Cool" after his debut.

In 2011, his first starring role in a drama was Kingyo Club, and in 2014, he made his first leading film role in Kikaider Reboot.

Irie likes music from rock bands, the video 【Press On! tv】 #6 Shohei Ito × Jingi Irie –Guitar Chūkyū-hen– released in Ken-On's official YouTube in 2013, and listens to bands such as Quruli, Asian Kung-Fu Generation and Yura Yura Teikoku. He likes Quruli so much he visited their live performances personally.

== Filmography ==
=== TV dramas ===
Year	Title	Role	Notes	Ref.
2011	Kingyo Club	Haru Hiiragi	Lead role	
2012	Perfect Son	Yuma Yoronagawa		
2014	Gunshi Kanbei	Bessho Nagaharu	Taiga drama	
2020	Awaiting Kirin	Maeda Toshiie	Taiga drama	
2022	Invisible	Sakurai	Episode 5	
2025	Unbound	Tayasu Haruaki	Taiga drama	
2025	Scandal Eve	Osamu Noguchi		

=== Films ===
Year	Title	Role	Notes	Ref.
2014	Kikaider Reboot	Jiro/Kikaider	Lead role	
2023	Eternal New Mornings	Young doctor		
2024	Don't Lose Your Head!	Hazama Jūjirō		

=== Stage ===
Year	Title	Role	Ref.
2016	Wakasama Kuma iru	Kengo Nagase	
2016	The Morose Mononokean	Hanae Ashiya / Haruitsuki Abe	
2016	Yoru ga Watashi o Matte iru –Night Must Fall–	Dan	

=== Anime ===
Year	Title	Role	Ref.
2010	Colorful	Saedome	

== Bibliography ==
=== DVD, videos ===
Year	Title
2010	I will...
2011	Jintabi

=== Photo albums ===
Year	Title
2011	1st Shashin-shū Jingi 18
2014	2nd Shashin-shū 0-Zero
