= My Absolute Boyfriend =

2019 South Korean television series

- Promotional poster
- Also known as: Absolute Boyfriend
- Hangul: 절대 그이
- RR: Jeoldae geui
- MR: Chŏltae kŭi
- Genre: Romantic comedy; Science fiction
- Based on: Absolute Boyfriend by Yuu Watase
- Written by: Yang Hyuk-moon
- Directed by: Jung Jung-hwa
- Starring: Yeo Jin-goo; Bang Min-ah; Hong Jong-hyun; Choi Sung-won; Hong Seo-young
- Country of origin: South Korea
- Original language: Korean
- No. of episodes: 40 (36 aired) (Note: Originally scheduled to air for 40 episodes, only 36 episodes were scheduled to air on SBS due to low ratings, as well as the suspension of the Monday-Tuesday drama time slot. The international broadcast remains at 40 episodes.) (Note: In order to circumvent Korean laws that prevent commercial breaks in the middle of an episode, what would previously have been aired as single 70 minute episodes are now being repackaged as two 35 minute episodes, with two episodes being shown each night with a commercial break between the two.) (list of episodes)

Production
- Executive producers: Lee Mi-ji; Teddy Jung
- Camera setup: Single-camera
- Running time: 35 minutes
- Production companies: Apollo Pictures; iHQ

Original release
- Network: SBS TV
- Release: May 15 – July 11, 2019

Related
- Absolute Boyfriend (Japan); Absolute Boyfriend (Taiwan)

My Absolute Boyfriend (Korean: 절대 그이), also titled Absolute Boyfriend, is a 2019 South Korean television drama series based on the manga Absolute Boyfriend by Yuu Watase and starring Yeo Jin-goo, Bang Min-ah, Hong Jong-hyun, Hong Seo-young and Choi Sung-won. The series aired on SBS TV on Wednesdays and Thursdays at 22:00 KST from May 15 to July 11, 2019. It is the third television drama based on the manga, following previous adaptations in Japan and Taiwan.

== Cast ==
=== Main ===
- Yeo Jin-goo as Zero Nine (Young-gu)

An android programmed to become the perfect boyfriend.

- Bang Min-ah as Um Da-da
- Hong Jong-hyun as Ma Wang-joon and Zero Ten

A top actor who in spite of his immense popularity, always seems to lose his cool around his girlfriend

- Hong Seo-young as Diana
- Choi Sung-won as Nam Bo-won

=== Supporting ===
- Gong Jung-hwan as Ko Ji-seok
- Kwon Hyun-sang as Hwang In-hyuk
- Cha Jung-won as Bae Kyu-ri
- Kim Do-hoon as Yoo Jin
- Ha Jae-sook as Yeo Woong
- Hong Seok-cheon as Geum Eun-dong
- Choi Joo-won as Hwa-ni
- Go Jung-min as Park Ran
- Lee Seung-il as Ma Gwi-hoon

=== Special appearances ===
- Yoon Shi-yoon as himself (Ep. 2)
- Jung In-gi as Da-da's father (Ep. 5)
- Hong Ji-yoon as Ruby

== Production ==
- The series was previously titled Romantic Comedy King and in talks to air on OCN, but was ultimately cancelled.
- The lead roles of Um Da-da and Ma Wang-jun were previously offered to Song Ji-hyo and Chun Jung-myung respectively, but both declined.
- The first script reading was held on June 22, 2018, and filming began in July.
- The filming was completed and the series was aired on SBS in May 2019. Originally scheduled to air for 40 episodes, the series was reduced by four episodes due to low ratings, as well as the suspension of the Monday-Tuesday drama timeslot that saw the following drama, Doctor Detective, move to the Wednesday-Thursday timeslot. The international broadcast remained at 40 episodes.

== Original soundtrack ==
My Absolute Boyfriend OST

Soundtrack album by Various artists
- Released: 2019
- Genre: Soundtrack
- Languages: Korean; English
- Label: Kakao M

=== Part 1 ===
Released on May 16, 2019
No.	Title	Lyrics	Music	Artist	Length
1.	"Like A Starlight" (별빛처럼)	Jay Kim; LeeBangWonSaDan; Sharon; Lee An; 89	Jay Kim; LeeBangWonSaDan; Sharon; Lee An; 89	Lena Park	3:47
2.	"Like A Starlight" (Inst.)		Jay Kim; LeeBangWonSaDan; Sharon; Lee An; 89		3:47
Total length:					7:34

=== Part 2 ===
Released on May 23, 2019
No.	Title	Lyrics	Music	Artist	Length
1.	"Still Waiting For You" (바라고 바라고)	Lee Seung-hee	Lee Seung-hee	Seungjun	4:03
2.	"Still Waiting For You" (Inst.)		Lee Seung-hee		4:03
Total length:					8:06

=== Part 3 ===
Released on May 31, 2019
No.	Title	Lyrics	Music	Artist	Length
1.	"Mr. Stranger"	atomik; K.lee; Kisum	atomik; K.lee; MHL	Kisum, Eunha (GFriend)	3:10
2.	"Mr. Stranger" (Inst.)		atomik; K.lee; MHL		3:10
Total length:					6:20

=== Part 4 ===
Released on June 6, 2019
No.	Title	Lyrics	Music	Artist	Length
1.	"My Absolute Boyfriend" (초능력 나의 그대)	Shim Hyun-bo	Shim Hyun-bo	Kei (Lovelyz)	3:24
2.	"My Absolute Boyfriend" (Inst.)		Shim Hyun-bo		3:24
Total length:					6:48

=== Part 5 ===
Released on June 13, 2019
No.	Title	Lyrics	Music	Artist	Length
1.	"Already Gone" (여느 때처럼)	Yoon Song	Yoon Song	Bily Acoustie	4:15
2.	"Already Gone" (Inst.)		Yoon Song		4:15
Total length:					8:30

=== Part 6 ===
Released on June 20, 2019
No.	Title	Lyrics	Music	Artist	Length
1.	"Tuk Tuk Tuk" (툭툭툭)	Jay Kim	Park Seo-hyun	BIYA	3:24
2.	"Tuk Tuk Tuk" (Inst.)		Park Seo-hyun		3:24
Total length:					6:48

=== Part 7 ===
Released on June 27, 2019
No.	Title	Lyrics	Music	Artist	Length
1.	"It Was Love" (사랑이었다)	Minah (Girl's Day); Jung Il-hoon (BtoB)	Minah (Girl's Day); Jerry.L	Minah (Girl's Day), Jung Il-hoon (BtoB)	3:21
2.	"It Was Love" (Inst.)		Minah (Girl's Day); Jerry.L		3:21
Total length:					6:42

=== Part 8 ===
Released on July 4, 2019
No.	Title	Lyrics	Music	Artist	Length
1.	"Error"	LoF!	LoF!; Yeun	Lee Si-eun	3:39
2.	"Error (Male Ver.)"	LoF!	LoF!; Yeun	Noah	3:39
3.	"Error (With Yeun of V!nyl) (Eng Ver.)"	LoF!	LoF!; Yeun	LoF!	3:39
Total length:					10:57

== Ratings ==
In this table, the blue numbers represent the lowest ratings and the red numbers represent the highest ratings.

Ep.	Original broadcast date	AGB Nielsen (Nationwide)
1	May 15, 2019	2.1%
2	May 15, 2019	2.4%
3	May 16, 2019	3.1%
4	May 16, 2019	3.5%
5	May 22, 2019	2.6%
6	May 22, 2019	3.0%
7	May 23, 2019	2.9%
8	May 23, 2019	3.0%
9	May 29, 2019	2.5%
10	May 29, 2019	2.7%
11	May 30, 2019	2.9%
12	May 30, 2019	2.7%
13	June 5, 2019	2.3%
14	June 5, 2019	2.7%
15	June 6, 2019	3.4%
16	June 6, 2019	3.1%
17	June 12, 2019	1.8%
18	June 12, 2019	1.8%
19	June 13, 2019	3.2%
20	June 13, 2019	2.9%
21	June 19, 2019	2.0%
22	June 19, 2019	2.5%
23	June 20, 2019	3.1%
24	June 20, 2019	2.6%
25	June 26, 2019	1.8%
26	June 26, 2019	2.2%
27	June 27, 2019	2.8%
28	June 27, 2019	2.3%
29	July 3, 2019	1.5%
30	July 3, 2019	1.7%
31	July 4, 2019	2.7%
32	July 4, 2019	2.4%
33	July 10, 2019	1.8%
34	July 10, 2019	1.7%
35	July 11, 2019	2.4%
36	July 11, 2019	2.0%
Average		2.5%
