= Hiro Mizushima =

Japanese actor (born 1984)

- 水嶋 ヒロ
- Born: Tomohiro Saitō (齋藤 智裕); 13 April 1984 (age 42); Tokyo, Japan
- Other name: Satoshi Saitō (齋藤 智)
- Occupations: Writer; actor
- Years active: 2005–present
- Labels: A Station (present); Ken-On
- Spouse: Ayaka Iida (m. 2009)
- Children: 2

YouTube information
- Channel: Hiro Mizushima
- Years active: 2019–present
- Genre: Vlog
- Subscribers: 217 thousand
- Views: 9.46 million
- Last updated: August, 2026
- Website: hiro-mizushima.com

Tomohiro Saitō (齋藤 智裕, Saitō Tomohiro; born 13 April 1984), known professionally as Hiro Mizushima (水嶋 ヒロ, Mizushima Hiro), is a Japanese actor, creative director, and writer. He appeared in a number of Japanese TV dramas, including Mei-chan no Shitsuji, Hanazakari no Kimitachi e and Zettai Kareshi. Additionally, he was well known as the protagonist Souji Tendo in the tokusatsu series Kamen Rider Kabuto. Mizushima serves as the co-producer, co-screenwriter and leading actor for the latest film Black Butler which is the live-action film adaptation of the popular manga. His birth name "Tomohiro Saito" is being credited as co-producer in the film.

Under his pen name Satoshi Saitō (齋藤 智, Saitō Satoshi), he wrote his first novel, Kagerou, which was chosen as the winner of the 5th Popular Publishing Grand Prize for Fiction and was published in 2010.

== Career ==
Mizushima first appeared on Japanese television in 2005, where he played Hiro Misawa, a minor character in the second season of Gokusen. In the same year, he found guest starring roles in Japanese dramas such as Ame to Yume no Ato ni and a small role in the TBS drama Brother Beat.

In 2006, Mizushima became a main character in the series Kamen Rider Kabuto and acted in the lead role in the film Kamen Rider Kabuto: God Speed Love.

Beginning in 2007, Mizushima began taking on bigger roles in more high-profile productions, such as the supporting role of the Minami Nanba in Hanazakari no Kimitachi e and the main role of Soshi Asamoto in Zettai Kareshi in 2008. Both dramas were among the most popular dramas of Japan at the time of their airing. Mizushima also provided the voice of Bruce Banner in the Japanese dub of The Incredible Hulk. Mizushima took the role of Jiro Mori in the 2008 TV drama Room of King.

In 2009, he starred in the drama Mei-chan no Shitsuji as Rihito Shibata, a perfect butler. In the same year, he landed the role of Toranosuke Hayashida in the drama Mr. Brain in which he played a detective's assistant. Later that year, Mizushima starred alongside Shun Oguri in the drama Tokyo Dogs, playing a detective who is a hot-blooded fighting expert due to his earlier days as a delinquent. He also starred in the feature film Drop in the same year in the role of Tatsuya Iguchi, a middle school student in a delinquent gang.

In 2010, Mizushima landed the role of Ryusuke Minami in the film Beck, in which once again acted alongside Mei-chan no Shitsuji co-star Takeru Satoh.

In September 2010, Mizushima left his talent agency, Ken-On, to create an own independent agency called A Station. Several weeks later, on 31 October 2010, it was announced that Mizushima had won the 5th Poplar Publishing Grand Prize for Fiction and a cash prize of 20 million yen for his debut work, titled Kagerou, written under the pen name Satoshi Saitō (齋藤 智, Saitō Satoshi) but he decided to decline the 20 million yen prize money. The book was published in December 2010. In the two and a half years of Oricon's book charts, Kagerou recorded the third highest first-week sales, behind J. K. Rowling's Harry Potter and the Deathly Hallows (1.191 million) and Haruki Murakami's 1Q84 Book 3 (398,000).

In 2014, Mizushima starred as Sebastian Michaelis in the film Black Butler, in which he also serves as the co-screenwriter and co-producer. The film was shown at the Toronto Japanese Film Festival and Brussels International Fantastic Film Festival 2014.

In August 2015, Mizushima announced that he would appear as a guest cast in the fifth season of HBO's Girls, which aired in 2016. This was his first international TV appearance.

On January 14, 2020, Hiro was announced as an ambassador of the upcoming eight installment of Shimajiro 3D CGI animated movie, which was released on February 28, 2020.

== Personal life ==
Mizushima is bilingual, being fluent in English and Japanese. He spent his whole elementary school years (1990 to 1996) in Zürich, Switzerland. He was bullied and discriminated against as a child at International School in Switzerland. When he came back to Japan, he attended the junior high school and the high school of Toin Gakuen, and belonged to the soccer club of the school. When he was in the twelfth grade, he worked as a regular midfielder in The 81st All Japan High School Soccer Tournament.

Mizushima graduated from Keio University and has a degree in Environmental Information.

He married Japanese pop singer Ayaka on 22 February 2009. In December 2014, the couple announced through their agency that they are expecting their first child. In June 2015, Mizushima announced via Instagram that he had become a father to a baby girl. In October 2019 they welcomed their second daughter.

On October 8, 2019, he became a YouTuber starring his own YouTube cooking show, Hiro-Meshi: Japanese Home-Style Cooking. One of the aired episode also guest starring his fellow actor from Kamen Rider Kabuto, Yūki Sato.

== Filmography ==
=== Dramas ===
Year	Title	Role	Network	Notes
2005	Gokusen (season 2)	Hiro Misawa	NTV	
2005	Ame to Yume no Ato ni		TV Asahi	Episode 7
2005	Brother Beat	Yoshi	TBS	
2005	Pink no Idenshi	Ikushima Mizuki	TV Tokyo	Episode 3
2006	Kamen Rider Kabuto	Souji Tendou/Souji Tendou (Mimic)	TV Asahi	
2007	Kanojo to no Tadashii Asobikata	Kyoji Fujiki	TV Asahi	
2007	Watashitachi no Kyokasho	Yahata Daisuke	Fuji TV	
2007	Hanazakari no Kimitachi e	Nanba Minami	Fuji TV	
2007	Gutannubo (Gout Temps Nouveau) Drama Special		Fuji TV	
2007	Churaumi Kara no Nengajo	Kota Miyashita	Fuji TV	
2008	Zettai Kareshi	Soshi Asamoto	Fuji TV	
2008	Room of King	Moriji/Jiro Mori	Fuji TV	
2008	Hanazakari no Kimitachi e SP	Minami Nanba	Fuji TV	
2009	Mei-chan no Shitsuji	Rihito Shibata	Fuji TV	
2009	Zettai Kareshi SP	Soshi Asamoto	Fuji TV	
2009	Mr. Brain	Toranosuke Hayashida	TBS	
2009	Tokyo Dogs	Maruo Kudo	Fuji TV	
2016	Girls (season 5)	Yoshi Kadokura	HBO	Episodes 3, 5

=== Films ===
Year	Title	Role
2006	Hatsukare	Ibushi
2006	Lovely Complex	Ryoji Suzuki
2006	Kamen Rider Kabuto: God Speed Love	Souji Tendou
2007	Kanojo to no Tadashii Asobikata	Takeshi Fujiki
2007	100 Scene no Koi	Yoji/Sota/Kazuya
2007	GS Wonderland	Shun Masamiya
2009	Drop	Tatsuya Iguchi
2010	Beck	Ryūsuke Minami
2014	Black Butler	Sebastian Michaelis

=== Dubbing ===
- The Incredible Hulk, Bruce Banner (Edward Norton)

== Books ==
- Kagerou (2010) ISBN 978-4-591-12245-7

== Photo books ==
- Hiro (January 2007)
- With You (November 2007)
- Hiromode (December 2008)
- Water Island: Peace (December 2009)

== Music videos ==
- Silent Scream Girl Next Door - Guest appearance and co-scriptwriter (2011)
