= Brother Beat =

Japanese television series

Brother Beat (ブラザー☆ビート, Burazā Bīto) is a Japanese television drama consisting of eleven episodes, which aired on the Tokyo Broadcasting System from October 13 to December 22, 2005.

== Premise ==
The program centers on a mother and three sons, living together and supporting one another since their father died when they were young; much of the plot centers around their romances, and various situations at work and at home. It is something of a reworking or revival of the 1995 TV drama Second Chance, which had much the same premise of a mother working at a supermarket and living with her three sons; Misako Tanaka stars in both shows as the mother. Though the rest of the characters and cast are different, and Brother Beat is not intended to carry on the same plot as a true sequel, there are a number of connections and references to Second Chance. For example, in this show Tanaka plays Harue Sakurai, where in Second Chance her character's name was Haruko Sakurai; Hidekazu Akai plays the husband or chief love interest of Tanaka's character in both shows, though that character's name and role differ. In many parts of Japan, the full run of Second Chance was re-aired in 2005 preceding the premiere of Brother Beat.

Though the plot of this series was meant to involve the development of a relationship between Harue and Hideki Noguchi, played by Katsuhisa Namase, ending in their marriage, Namase's schedule interfered with this. However, it was arranged that the two would play the main character's parents in a 2006 TV drama called 14-year-old Mother.

== Cast ==
- Harue Sakurai - Misako Tanaka (mother, works at a supermarket)
- Tsutomu Sakurai - Hidekazu Akai (father, dies when his sons are young)
- Tatsuya Sakurai - Tetsuji Tamayama (oldest brother, works as a salaryman)
  - Child Tatsuya - Yūki Izumisawa
- Riku Sakurai - Mokomichi Hayami (middle brother, swim instructor at a gym)
  - Child Riku - Ryōhei Hirota
- Junpei Sakurai - Akiyoshi Nakao (youngest brother, college student)
- Hideki Noguchi - Katsuhisa Namase (Harue's manager at the supermarket; main love interest for her)
- Chisato Tamura - Ryoko Kuninaka (works at the supermarket with Harue; main love interest for Tatsuya)
- Ai Kudō - Reina Asami
- Miyuki Aizawa - Mayuko Iwasa
- Section Chief Yamaguchi - Akio Kaneda (Tatsuya's boss)
- Azuma - Hideo Tsubota
- Yoshii - Hiro Mizushima
- Saori Tsukahara - Minami Ōtomo
- Yumiko Toda - Miyako Takeuchi
- Megumi Nomura - Hiroko Yamashita
- Kyōko Nishihara - Naoko Miya
- Keiko - Kazusa Matsuda
- Aki & Rie Yoshihara - Aya Okamoto
- Morimura - Tomoharu Hasegawa
- Miyuki Aizawa's father - Kenichi Yajima
- Fusako Tamura - Kyōko Uemura (Chisato's mother)
- Shōgo Tamura - Takuzō Kadono (Chisato's father)
- Kei Tamura - Hideo Ishiguro (Chisato's younger brother)

== Staff ==
- Writer - Eriko Komatsu
- Directors - Kanji Takenoshita, Shin Katō, Jun Mutō
- Producer - Hitohiro Itō
- Broadcaster - Tokyo Broadcasting System
- Music - Def Tech (main themes "Broken Hearts" and "My Way")
