= Rebound (2011 TV series) =

- Genre: Romantic comedy
- Written by: Kazuhiko Yukawa
- Directed by: Seiichi Nagumo; Jun Ishio; Ken Higure
- Starring: Saki Aibu; Mokomichi Hayami; Chiaki Kuriyama; Ryō Katsuji; Maki Nishiyama; Ryō Ryūsei; Mayumi Wakamura
- Country of origin: Japan
- Original language: Japanese
- No. of seasons: 1
- No. of episodes: 10

Production
- Producers: Futoshi Ōhira; Masaharu Ōta
- Running time: 54 minutes

Original release
- Network: Nippon TV
- Release: April 27 – June 29, 2011

Rebound (リバウンド, Ribaundo) is a Japanese romantic comedy television drama series that aired from 27 April to 29 June 2011 on Nippon TV. Saki Aibu played the lead role as an 85 kg weight woman with special makeup. It's available on Crunchyroll.

== Cast ==
- Saki Aibu as Nobuko Ōba
- Mokomichi Hayami as Taichi Imai
- Chiaki Kuriyama as Hitomi Mimura
- Ryō Katsuji as Kensaku Kazami
- Maki Nishiyama as Yūki Naitō
- Ryō Ryūsei as Shirō Tenno
- Mayumi Wakamura as Ran Morinaka
