= Maki Nishiyama =

Japanese model and actress (born 1985)

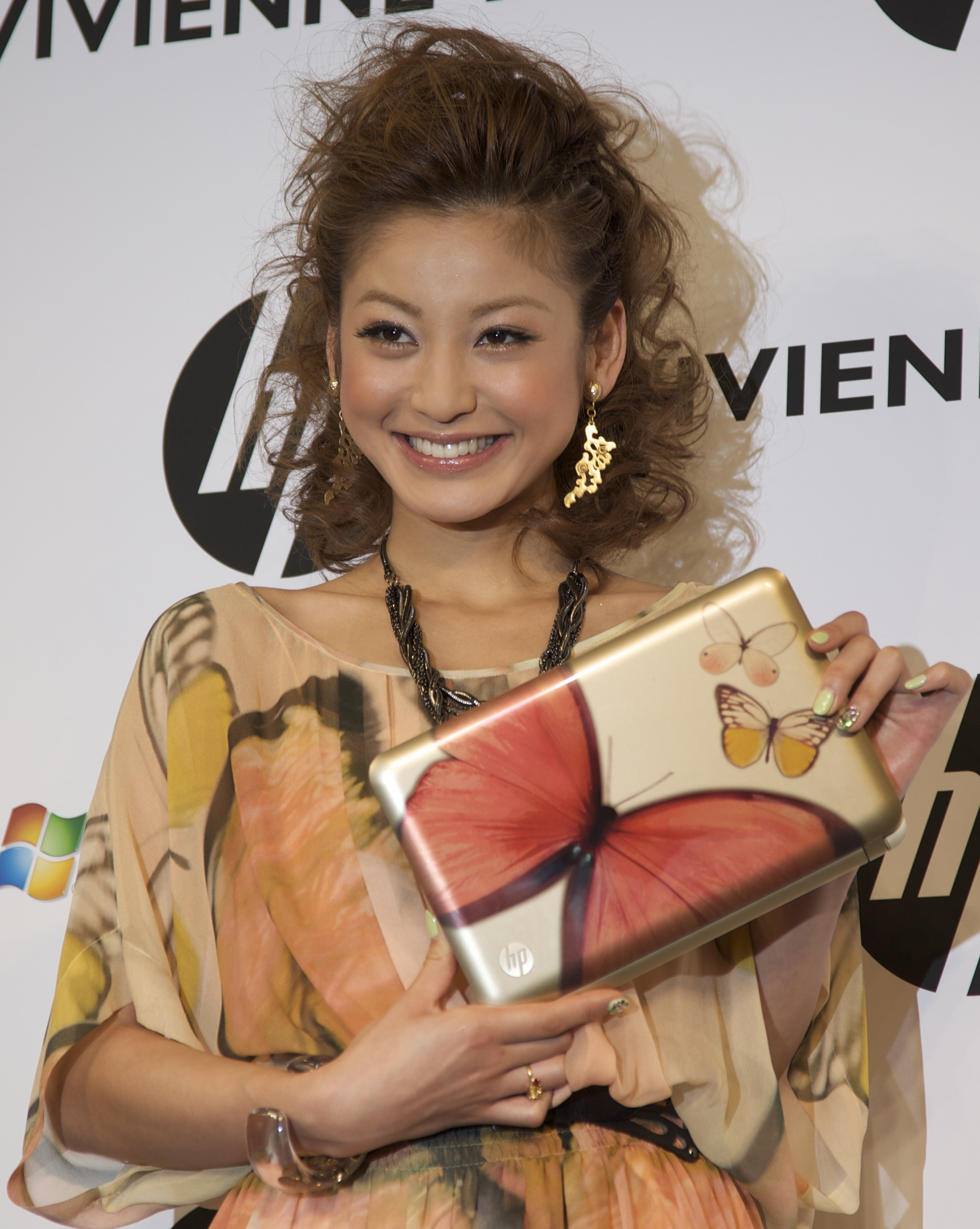
- Born: November 16, 1985 (age 40)
- Occupations: Model, actress
- Years active: 2004–present
- Spouse: Taichi Saotome (m. 2013; div. 2019)
- Children: 2
- Modeling information
- Height: 1.68 m (5 ft 6 in)
- Hair color: Brown
- Eye color: Brown

Maki Nishiyama (西山茉希, Nishiyama Maki; born November 16, 1985) is a Japanese model and actress. Her best-known modeling work has been with the Japanese fashion magazine, CanCam.

== Career ==
In 2005, Nishiyama started her career as a model for the Japanese fashion magazine CanCam under an exclusive contract. She has also appeared in television advertisements for several companies, from Nivea-Kao in 2006 to McDonald's Japan in 2009. She played a role in a TV drama, Moon lovers (Tsuki no koibito) in 2010. She played the role of Nabiki Tendo in the Ranma ½ live-action special aired in December 2011.

== Television ==
List of acting performances in television
Year	Title	Role	Notes	Source
2011	Rebound	Yuki Naito		
2011	Ranma ½ live-action special	Nabiki Tendo		
