= Kikaider Reboot =

- Theatrical poster

Japanese name
- Kanji: キカイダー REBOOT
Transcriptions
- Revised Hepburn: Kikaidā Ribūto
- Directed by: Ten Shimoyama
- Written by: Kento Shimoyama
- Based on: Kikaider by Shotaro Ishinomori
- Produced by: Shinichiro Shirakura; Shinichiro Inoue
- Starring: Jingi Irie; Aimi Satsukawa; Kazushige Nagashima
- Production companies: Kadokawa Daiei Studio; Ishimori Productions
- Distributed by: Toei Company (Japan); Kadokawa (Worldwide)
- Release date: May 24, 2014 (Japan)
- Running time: 110 minutes
- Country: Japan
- Language: Japanese

Kikaider Reboot (キカイダー REBOOT, Kikaidā Ribūto; titled on-screen as Kikaider Reboots) (Note: Also known as Kikaider: The Ultimate Human Robot and Kikaider: Ultimate Human Machine) is a 2014 Japanese science fiction tokusatsu film directed by Ten Shimoyama. The film is a reboot of the Kikaider franchise created by Shotaro Ishinomori.

== Plot ==
In the near future, the Japanese government develops the ARK Project, led by Dr. Nobuhiko Kohmyoji, to create androids to help public citizens. Two prototypes are constructed: one by Dr. Kohmyoji, Jiro/Kikaider, an android built with an experimental Conscience Circuit, and another by Professor Gilbert Kanzaki, Mari, a combat-based android.

Dr. Kohmyoji mysteriously dies and his children, Mitsuko and Masaru are suddenly targeted by Japan's Defense Minister. Jiro comes to their aide and vows to protected them, a final request from Dr. Kohmyoji. Masaru becomes fond of Jiro but Mitsuko becomes wary of him. Mari eventually finds Jiro and nearly destroys him but spares him after Mitsuko and Masaru agree to go with her without resistance. A data chip is then retrieved from within Masaru's body, containing all of Dr. Kohmyoji's research. The Defense Minister then turns the ARK Project into the DARK Project (Developing Advanced Research by Kohmyoji) and forces Professor Gil to complete his work.

Jiro is then attacked by another android named "Hakaider", who is revealed to be Professor Gil, having surgically placed his brain within an android body. Hakaider proceeds to destroy the ARK Project facility where he is counter-attacked by Jiro. Mitsuko tries to stop him from fighting but Jiro finally realizes his own free-will and chooses to protect by fighting. Jiro manages to defeat Hakaider but at the cost of his life. Mitsuko vows to one day rebuild him.

In a post-credit scene, the Defense Minister, having escaped the demise of the facility with Mari, confirms the official start of the true android project.

== Cast ==
- Jiro (ジロー, Jirō)/Kikaider (キカイダー, Kikaidā; Voice): Jingi Irie (入江 甚儀, Irie Jingi)
- Nobuhiko Kohmyoji (光明寺 信彦, Kōmyōji Nobuhiko): Kazushige Nagashima (長嶋 一茂, Nagashima Kazushige)
- Mitsuko Kohmyoji (光明寺 ミツ子, Kōmyōji Mitsuko): Aimi Satsukawa (佐津川 愛美, Satsukawa Aimi)
- Masaru Kohmyoji (光明寺 マサル, Kōmyōji Masaru): Yuto Ikeda (池田 優斗, Ikeda Yūto)
- Hanpei Hattori (服部 半平, Hattori Hanpei): Ryuji Harada (原田 龍二, Harada Ryūji)
- Gilbert Kanzaki (ギルバート 神崎, Girubāto Kanzaki)/Hakaider (ハカイダー, Hakaidā; Voice): Shingo Tsurumi (鶴見 辰吾, Tsurumi Shingo)
- Mari (マリ, Mari): Maryjun Takahashi (高橋 メアリージュン, Takahashi Mearījun)
- Kyujiro Maeno (前野 究治郎, Maeno Kyūjirō): Daisuke Ban (伴 大介, Ban Daisuke)
- Shinnosuke Tanabe (田部 慎之介, Tanabe Shinnosuke): Renji Ishibashi (石橋 蓮司, Ishibashi Renji)
- Sogoro Honda (本田 宗五郎, Honda Sōgorō): Hirotarō Honda (本田 博太郎, Honda Hirotarō)

== Production ==
At the end of Kamen Rider × Super Sentai × Space Sheriff: Super Hero Taisen Z (2013), a post-credits scene features the sound of a heartbeat and Kikaider is shown with the narrator stating that all the heroes that were featured in the movie "aren't the only superheroes of Earth". The 30th episode of Kamen Rider Gaim serves as a prequel to the events of the movie.

Toei officially announced the film on January 30, 2014 in association with Kadokawa Daiei Studio. The screenplay reportedly took 2 years to complete. The first visual was unveiled on February 20, 2014.

The film's theme song is a re-recording of the original "Go Go Kikaider" titled "Go Go Kikaider Reboot 2014" (ゴーゴー・キカイダー REBOOT2014, Gōgō Kikaidā Ribūto Nisenjūyon).

== Release ==
The film was released nationwide in Japan on May 24, 2014. On October 10, 2014, Kikaider Reboot premiered in Honolulu, due to the popularity of the original Android Kikaider in the 1970s and to celebrate the 40th anniversary of Kikaider in Hawaii. It was released on Region 1 DVD in Hawaii by JN Productions/Generation Kikaida in 2014 and by PMP in Malaysia.
