= Absolute Boyfriend (Taiwanese TV series) =

2012 Taiwanese television series

- Promotional poster
- Also known as: My Perfect Darling
- Traditional Chinese: 絕對達令
- Simplified Chinese: 绝对达令
- Literal meaning: Absolute Darling
- Hanyu Pinyin: Juéduì Dálìng
- Genre: Romance
- Based on: Absolute Boyfriend by Yuu Watase
- Directed by: Liu jun Jie (劉俊傑)
- Starring: Jiro Wang; Koo Hye-sun; Kun Da
- Opening theme: "Mr. Perfect" by Fahrenheit
- Ending theme: "假装我们没爱过" ("Pretend We Have Never Loved") by Jiro Wang
- Country of origin: Taiwan
- Original language: Mandarin
- No. of episodes: 13 (original); 20 (international)

Production
- Producer: Wang Xin Gui (王信貴)
- Running time: 90 minutes (incl. advertisements) (original); 60 minutes (incl. advertisements) (international)
- Production company: GTV

Original release
- Network: FTV, GTV
- Release: April 8 – July 1, 2012

Related
- Absolute Boyfriend (Japan); My Absolute Boyfriend (South Korea)

Absolute Boyfriend
- Traditional Chinese: 絕對達令
- Simplified Chinese: 绝对达令
Transcriptions
Standard Mandarin
- Hanyu Pinyin: Juéduì Dálìng

Absolute Boyfriend (traditional Chinese: 絕對達令; simplified Chinese: 绝对达令; pinyin: Juéduì Dálìng, lit. 'Absolute Darling', titled My Perfect Darling in English in Japan) is a Taiwanese romance drama television series based on the manga by Yuu Watase. Jiro Wang, member of Taiwanese boy band Fahrenheit played Night Tenjo's role while South Korean actress Koo Hye-sun played Riiko Izawa.

== Plot ==
Guan Xiaofei, an ordinary office worker, is heartbroken when she once again gets rejected by a man she loves, Shi Lun. While walking through a park, Xiaofei picks up a cellphone dropped by an eccentric salesman, Lei Wuwu. In return for retrieving the phone, Wuwu gives Xiaofei a website address dedicated to the "Absolute Darling" project. Still skeptical, Xiaofei decides to fill up her order anyway and requests her own "darling", codenamed "Nightly 01" with hundreds of wish fulfillments. Xiaofei is surprised when Kronos Heaven, the company that Wuwu works for, delivers Nightly 01 the next day, and is even more flabbergasted when Nightly 01 turns out be a hyper-realistic, human male sex robot whose power activation requires a kiss. Despite his function as a sex robot, Xiaofei refuses the offer for sex and instead wants the robot, whom she names Wan Naite, to be her boyfriend.

However, Xiaofei is informed that after three days of trial period that she has to buy the robot for NT$100,000,000. An attempt to search for work at a club is fruitless when Naite reacts violently to seeing Xiaofei being harassed, so instead Naite applies for a job at Xiaofei's office. His unusual attachment to Xiaofei becomes a sensation at the office and attracts the attention of Xiaofei's friend, Luo Meijia, who is revealed to be the one stopping Xiaofei from having a boyfriend due to an old incident at work where Xiaofei humiliated Meijia at the workplace. At a company retreat, Meijia tries to sabotage Xiaofei and attracts Naite's attention, but her plans are unsuccessful and she herself later quits the office in humiliation when everyone discovers her true nature. At the same time, Naite also incites jealousy on the part of Yan Zongshi, a childhood friend of Xiaofei who has long been in love with her.

Wuwu later tells Xiaofei that she does not need to pay for the original price, but instead she merely has to pay for Naite's service costs as well as recording all emotions to be displayed in Naite's emotion ring: calm (white), happy (red), pleasure (pink), upset (blue), sad (black), and an increased libido (yellow). To earn more money, Naite works at a club servicing female customers, though this only makes Xiaofei jealous. One of Naite's customers is Meijia, who kisses him, causing his allegiance to switch to her due to his simple programming. Despite this, though, the fact that he still remembers Xiaofei makes Wuwu realize that there is still hope for him to return to Xiaofei, who goes through a swimming challenge to finally be able to kiss Naite back, a task that she is successful with.

Agitated with the hard road for libido, Wuwu arranges for Xiaofei and Naite to have a honeymoon at a private island, to no avail due to Zongshi's appearance. Kronos Heaven's leader, Jiang Baiqi, also sends another model, Nightly 02 under the name of his brother and Xiaofei's childhood friend, Jiang Junshu, to steal Naite's place in Xiaofei's heart, which ends in Naite's Pyrrhic victory, resulting in him having to be sent to Kronos Heaven to be scrapped. Nevertheless, Naite works his way to Xiaofei and defeats a doppelganger sent in his place for Xiaofei. Realizing that he has grown beyond his programming, Baiqi decides to let him go.

However, it is revealed that due to developing his own will, Naite is slowly dying from battery failure. Despite this, he does not tell Xiaofei and continues to make her happy in the days before his "death", all the while asking Zongshi to take care of Xiaofei once he is not around. In the final episode, Xiaofei and Naite arranges for a wedding. However, Naite and Xiaofei hold a dress rehearsal with just the two of them the night before the planned wedding, during which Naite finally shuts down much to Xiaofei's grief. On the day of the funeral, Wuwu and Zongshi go to the church to find Naite already packaged to return to Kronos Heaven to be preserved by Baiqi until technology can improve to possibly revive him once more. Upon finding out Naite has 10 seconds left of charge, Xiaofei shares some last words with him in hopes he can still hear her.

== Cast ==
Note: Characters' names displayed as "in-drama Taiwanese name / original Japanese name"

Actor	Character
Jiro Wang	Wan Naite (萬奈特) / Night Tenjo
Koo Hye-sun; Chien Shih-Yin (young)	Guan Xiaofei (官筱菲) / Riiko Izawa
Hsieh Kun Da	Yan Zongshi (嚴宗史) / Soushi Asamoto
Uei Hsun-Na	Lei Wuwu (雷霧霧) / Gaku Namikiri
Cherry Hsia	Luo Meijia (羅美佳) / Mika Ito
Tsai Han-Tsen	Fang Zhixi (方智希) / Satori Miyabe
Im Jun-yeong	SKY
Bi Xiao-Hai	Jiang Baiqi (江白奇) / Yuki Shirasaki
Shiou Chieh-Kai	Jiang Junshu (江俊樹) / Toshiki Shirasaki
David Chen	Shi Lun (石綸) / Ishizeki

== Production ==
On October 5, 2010, a Taiwanese live action adaptation of Absolute Boyfriend was filmed, starring singer-actor Wu Chun as "Night" and South Korean actress Ku Hye-sun as "Riiko". On May 3, 2011, Jiro Wang replaced fellow Fahrenheit member Wu Chun as the male lead.

== Reception ==
Formosa Television (FTV) (民視) Ratings
Episode	Original Broadcast Date	Average	Rank	Remarks
1	April 8, 2012	1.00	5	This includes bloopers.
2	April 15, 2012	0.91	5	
3	April 22, 2012	0.92	5	
4	April 29, 2012	0.76	3	
5	May 6, 2012	0.67	3	
6	May 13, 2012	0.67	3	
7	May 20, 2012	0.64	3	
8	May 27, 2012	0.70	2	
9	June 3, 2012	0.58	4	
10	June 10, 2012	0.60	3	
11	June 17, 2012	0.81	2	
12	June 24, 2012	0.66	3	
13	July 1, 2012	0.86	3	
Average		0.75	-	
