= Hiroko Yamashita (actress) =

Japanese actress

Hiroko Yamashita (山下 裕子, Yamashita Hiroko, born 20 June 1963 in Tokyo) is a Japanese actress.

== Career ==
Born in Tokyo, she studied at Waseda University but left before graduating. On stage, she participated in Shoji Kokami's troupe, Daisan Butai, and also appeared in plays directed by Yukio Ninagawa and Hideki Noda. She has appeared in over fifty Japanese TV dramas, including Brother Beat and the Onsen e ikō series.

== TV programs ==
- Yo ni mo Kimyona Monogatari (Fuji TV)
- Odoru Daisosasen (1997 Fuji TV)
- Onsen e Iko (1999–2004, TBS)
- Naniwa Kinyudo 4 (1999, Fuji TV)
- Brother Beat (2005, TBS)
