= Saki Aibu =

Japanese actress

- 相武 紗季
- Born: 20 June 1985 (age 41); Takarazuka, Hyōgo prefecture, Japan
- Occupation: Actress
- Years active: 2003–present
- Agent: Box Corporation
- Known for: Attention Please (2006); Zettai Kareshi (2008); Kaseifu no Mita (2011)
- Spouse: Undisclosed (m. 2016)
- Children: 2

Saki Aibu (相武 紗季, Aibu Saki; born June 20, 1985) is a Japanese actress. She is represented by Box Corporation.

== Filmography ==
=== Drama ===
- Water Boys (Fuji TV, 2003) as Atsumi Hayakawa
- Lion Sensei (YTV, 2003) as Aya Onohara
- Itoshi Kimi e (Fuji TV, 2004) as Banri Agawa
- Gekidan Engimono Automatic (Fuji TV, 2004) as Sakurai
- Ganbatte Ikimasshoi (KTV, 2005) as Rie Yano
- Donmai (NHK, 2005) as Yū Satomi
- Happy! (TBS, 2006) as Miyuki Umino
- Attention Please (Fuji TV, 2006) as Yayoi Wakamura
- Regatta (TV Asahi, 2006) as Misao Odagiri
- Happy! 2 (TBS, 2006) as Miyuki Umino
- The Family (TBS, 2007) as Tsugiko Manpyō
- Attention Please Special: Hawaii Honolulu-hen (Fuji TV, 2007) as Yayoi Wakamura
- Ushi ni Negai o: Love & Farm (KTV, 2007) as Ayaka Fujii
- Utahime (TBS, 2007) as Suzu Kishida/Ruriko Matsunaka
- Zettai Kareshi (Absolute Boyfriend) (Fuji TV, 2008) as Izawa Riiko
- Attention Please Special: Australia Sydney-hen (Fuji TV, 2008) as Yayoi Wakamura
- Triangle (KTV, 2009) as Yui Gōda
- Tenchijin (NHK, 2009) as Hanahime
- Tales of the Unusual: Spring 2009 (Fuji TV, 2009) as Ayaka Kida
- Buzzer Beat (Fuji TV, 2009) as Natsuki Nanami
- Seichō Matsumoto Drama Special Kiri no Hata (NTV, 2010) as Kiriko Yanagida
- Wagaya no Rekishi (Fuji TV, 2010) as Misora Hibari
- Perfect Report (Fuji TV, 2010) as Midori Okusawa
- Ashita mo Mata Ikite Ikou (TBS, 2010) as Saori Kimura
- Kokuhatsu: Kokusen Bengonin (TV Asahi, 2011) as Tsuruko Sawara
- Rebound (NTV, 2011) as Nobuko Oba
- I'm Mita, Your Housekeeper. (NTV, 2011) as Urara Yuuki
- Rich Man, Poor Woman (Fuji TV, 2012) as Yōko Asahina
- Rich Man, Poor Woman in New York (Fuji TV, 2013) as Yōko Asahina
- Otomesan (TV Asahi, 2013) as Ririka Mizusawa
- Miss Pilot (Fuji TV, 2013) as Chisato Oda
- Massan (NHK, 2014) as Yūko Tanaka
- Garasu no Ashi (WOWOW, 2015) as Setsuko Kōda
- Ishitachi no Renai Jijō (Fuji TV, 2015) as Nana Kawai
- Angel Heart (2015) as Kaori Makimura
- Karikare (2015)
- Tamiō Spinoff: Koi Suru Sōsaisen (2016) as Shion Yukino
- Boku no Yabai Tsuma (2016) as Anna Kitasato
- Kyoaku wa Nemurasenai (2016) as Haruka Hattanda
- Black Pean (2018) as Shoko Yamamoto
- Omusubi (2024) as Machiko Sakuraba

=== Movies ===
- The Taste of Tea (2004) as Hotal
- Mail de Todoita Monogatari (2005) as Risa Tanimura
- Beat Kids (2005) as Nanao
- Short Cakes (2005) as Nana
- Professor Layton And The Eternal Diva (2009) as (Remi/Emmy Altava)
- Golden Slumbers (2010) as Koume Inohara
- Neck (2010) as Sugina Mayama
- Koi Suru Neapolitan: Sekai de Ichiban Oishī Aisarekata (2010) as Ruri Satō
- Hankyū Densha (2011) as Mayumi
- Fly: Heibon na Kiseki (2012) as Nanami Takasaki
- The Liar and His Lover (2013) as Mari
- A Loving Husband (2017) as Sumire Kadokura

=== Video games ===
- Professor Layton series - (Remi/Emmy Altava)

=== Dubbing ===
- Abraham Lincoln: Vampire Hunter, Mary Todd Lincoln (Mary Elizabeth Winstead)

== Personal life ==
Aibu was born in Hyōgo prefecture. On May 3, 2016, she announced her marriage to a non-celebrity man through her agency.

On October 4, 2017, Aibu announced through her agency that she and her husband have welcomed the birth of their first child, their second child, a daughter was born on May 21, 2020.

As of August 2023, Aibu currently living in Singapore, as revealed by her friend and model Aiku Maikawa's Instagram.

Due to her father's influence as a former American football player, she is a big fan of the NFL. Since 2015, she has made irregular appearances on "Audrey's NFL Club," and was a guest commentator on-site with Audrey at the 50th Super Bowl in February 2016.

== Photobooks ==
- Water Piece (2004, Wani Books) ISBN 4847028023
- 10-dai: Aibu Love Live File (2005, Shueisha) ISBN 4089070031
- Surf Trip (2007, Shueisha) ISBN 9784087804751
