= Hong Jong-hyun =

South Korean actor and model

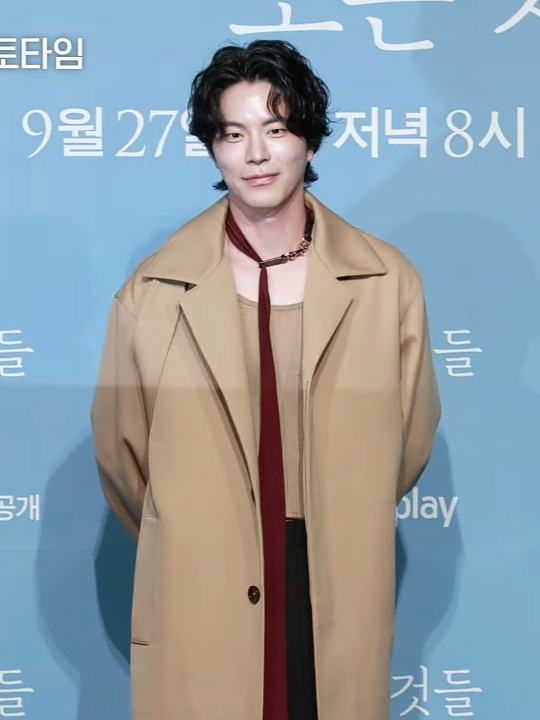
- Hong in September 2024
- Born: February 2, 1990 (age 36) (Note: On the lunar calendar Hong's birthday is January 7, while on the gregorian calendar it is February 2.); Seoul, South Korea
- Education: Konkuk University – Department of Film Arts
- Occupations: Actor; model
- Years active: 2007–present
- Agent: Secret ENT
- Height: 182 cm (5 ft 11 1/2 in)

Korean name
- Hangul: 홍종현
- Hanja: 洪宗玄
- RR: Hong Jonghyeon
- MR: Hong Chonghyŏn

Hong Jong-hyun (born February 2, 1990) is a South Korean actor and model.

== Career ==
Hong began his entertainment career in 2007 as a professional model. He made his acting debut in 2008, and has appeared in the romantic comedy Oh! My Lady (2010), sitcom Vampire Idol (2011), followed by supporting roles in Jeon Woo-chi (2012) and Dating Agency: Cyrano (2013). In 2014, Hong was cast in his first leading role in the cable series Her Lovely Heels, followed by the melodrama Mama. He also joined the fourth season of reality show We Got Married, pairing up with Girl's Day member Yura.

Hong next starred in the romantic comedy film Enemies In-Law and horror film Alice: Boy from Wonderland in 2015, followed by historical drama Moon Lovers: Scarlet Heart Ryeo in 2016.

In 2017, he co-starred in historical melo-romance drama The King in Love. In 2018, he was cast in the romantic comedy drama My Absolute Boyfriend, based on the Japanese manga series of the same name. He is also set to star in the time-loop drama film Spring, Again.

In March 2019, Hong is confirmed to star in the weekend drama Mother of Mine.

Hong enlisted for his mandatory service on December 2, 2019.

After discharge from military service In October 2021, Hong attended the What We Lost Vol.2 photo exhibition as a photographer.

In 2022, Hong returns to the original TVING drama Stock Struck, after his discharge from the military.

In September 2023, Hong signed with new agency Secret ENT.

== Filmography ==
=== Film ===
| Year | Title | Role | Notes | Ref. |
|---|---|---|---|---|
| 2008 | Lovers | Tom | segment: "Hey, Tom" | |
| 2008 | A Frozen Flower | King's men | | |
| 2009 | One Step More to the Sea | Joon-seo | | |
| 2010 | Ghost (Be With Me) | Jae-young | segment: "Tarot 2. Attached" | |
| 2015 | Enemies In-Law | Han Chul-soo | | |
| 2015 | Alice: Boy from Wonderland | Hwan | | |
| 2019 | Spring, Again | Ji Ho-min | | |

=== Television series ===
| Year | Title | Role | Notes | Ref. |
|---|---|---|---|---|
| 2009 | Heading to the Ground | Hong Kyung-rae | | |
| 2010 | Oh! My Lady | Park Jin-ho | | |
| 2010 | Jungle Fish 2 | Min Ho-soo | | |
| 2011 | White Christmas | Lee Jae-kyu | | |
| 2011 | Warrior Baek Dong-soo | Crown Prince Yi San | | |
| 2011 | Vampire Idol | Jong-hyun / Yariru Genius | | |
| 2012 | Wild Romance | Seo Yoon-yi | | |
| 2012 | Hero | Jang Kyung-ho | Cameo | |
| 2012 | To My Beloved | Go Jin-se | | |
| 2012 | Jeon Woo-chi | Seo Chan-hwi | | |
| 2013 | Dating Agency: Cyrano | Moo-jin | | |
| 2014 | Her Lovely Heels | Oh Tae-soo | | |
| 2014 | Drama Special – The Reason I'm Getting Married | Lee Joon-ki | one act-drama | |
| 2014 | Mama | Gu Ji-sub | | |
| 2015 | Yoo-mi's Room | | cameo (episode 6) | |
| 2016 | Moon Lovers: Scarlet Heart Ryeo | Wang Yo | | |
| 2017 | The King in Love | Wang Rin | | |
| 2019 | Mother of Mine | Han Tae-joo | | |
| 2019 | My Absolute Boyfriend | Ma Wang-jun | | |
| 2023 | The Killing Vote | Mysterious man | Cameo (episode 12) | |
| 2025 | Dear X | Moon Do-hyeok | Cameo (episode 8–12) | |
| 2026 | Positively Yours | Cha Min-wook | | |

=== Web series ===
| Year | Title | Role | Ref. |
|---|---|---|---|
| 2022 | Stock Struck | Choi Seon-woo | |
| 2023 | Race | Ryu Jae-min | |
| 2024 | What Comes After Love | Min-jun | |

=== Television shows ===
| Year | Title | Role | Notes | Ref. |
|---|---|---|---|---|
| 2012 | Mnet Wide Entertainment News | MC | | |
| 2013 | Style Log, Season 1 | MC | | |
| 2013 | Petorialist | Cast member | | |
| 2014 | Style Log, Season 2 | MC | | |
| 2014–2015 | We Got Married Season 4 | Cast member | With Girl's Day Yura | |
| 2014–2015 | Inkigayo | MC | | |
| 2016 | Law of the Jungle - Panama | Cast member | Episode 195–198 | |
| 2016 | Top Gear Korea | MC | Season 7 | |
| 2022 | Learning Camping | Cast Member | with Park Sung-woong and Shin Seung-hwan | |

=== Music video appearances ===
| Year | Song title | Artist | Ref. |
|---|---|---|---|
| 2008 | "I Hurt That Person" | Epitone Project | |
| 2008 | "This Is Not a Love Song" | Sentimental Scenery | |
| 2013 | "Rewind" | Double K feat. Michelle Lee | |
| 2013 | "Falling in Love" | 2NE1 | |
| 2014 | "No Answer" | Hong Dae-kwang | |
| 2015 | "Time Forgets" | Yoon Hyun-sang | |
| 2015 | "Shall We Dance" | Snuper | |

== Awards and nominations ==
Name of the award ceremony, year presented, category, nominee of the award, and the result of the nomination
| Award ceremony | Year | Category | Nominee / Work | Result | Ref. |
|---|---|---|---|---|---|
| Asia Artist Awards | 2017 | Popularity Award, Actor | The King in Love | Nominated | |
| Asia Model Awards | 2015 | New Star Award | Hong Jong-hyun | Won | |
| Cable TV Broadcasting Awards | 2015 | Best Couple Award | Hong Jong-hyun (with Han Seung-yeon); Her Lovely Heels | Won | |
| Chunsa Film Awards | 2016 | Popularity Award | Hong Jong-hyun | Won | |
| KBS Drama Awards | 2019 | Excellence Award, Actor in a Serial Drama | Mother of Mine | Nominated | |
| Korea Best Dresser Swan Awards | 2011 | Best Dressed Model | Hong Jong-hyun | Won | |
| MBC Drama Awards | 2014 | Best New Actor | Mama | Nominated | |
| MBC Drama Awards | 2017 | Excellence Award, Actor in a Monday-Tuesday Drama | The King in Love | Nominated | |
| MBC Entertainment Awards | 2014 | New Star of the Year | We Got Married | Won | |
| SBS Drama Awards | 2016 | Excellence Award, Actor in a Fantasy Drama | Moon Lovers: Scarlet Heart Ryeo | Nominated | |
