= Angel Heart (2015 TV series) =

- Genre: Drama
- Based on: Angel Heart by Tsukasa Hojo
- Written by: Yūya Takahashi
- Directed by: Hibiki Itō
- Starring: Takaya Kamikawa; Ayaka Miyoshi; Saki Aibu
- Music by: Takahiro Kaneko
- Country of origin: Japan
- Original language: Japanese
- No. of episodes: 9

Production
- Producers: Hisashi Tsugiya; Yukitoshi Chiba; Akira Miyagawa
- Running time: 55 minutes
- Production company: Nippon Television

Original release
- Network: NNS (Nippon TV)
- Release: October 11 – December 6, 2015

Angel Heart (エンジェル・ハート) is a Japanese television drama series based on the manga series of the same name by Tsukasa Hojo. Takaya Kamikawa played as Ryō Saeba, Ayaka Miyoshi played as Xiang-Ying, and Saki Aibu played as Kaori Makimura. The theme song is "Save me" by Mariya Nishiuchi. It premiered on NTV on October 11, 2015. The first episode received a viewership rating of 12.5%.

== Cast ==
- Takaya Kamikawa as Ryō Saeba
- Ayaka Miyoshi as Xiang-Ying
- Saki Aibu as Kaori Makimura
- Reiko Takashima as Saeko Nogami
- Shohei Miura as Liu Xin-Hong
- Brother Tom as Falcon

Preceded by Death Note (5 July 2015 - 13 September 2015)	NTV Sunday Dramas; Sundays 22:30 - 23:25 (JST)	Succeeded by T.B.D.
