= 37.5°C no Namida =

Japanese manga series

- First tankōbon volume cover, featuring Momoko Sugisaki

37.5°Cの涙
- Genre: Drama
- Manga
- Written by: Chika Shiina
- Published by: Shogakukan
- Imprint: Flower Comics
- Magazine: Cheese!
- Original run: October 24, 2013 – May 24, 2022
- Volumes: 24
- Television drama
- Directed by: Takeshi Furusawa; Takashi Fujio; Makito Murakami
- Written by: Mika Umeda
- Original network: TBS
- Original run: July 9, 2015 – September 17, 2015
- Episodes: 10

37.5°C no Namida (37.5°Cの涙; lit. "37.5°C Tears") is a Japanese manga series written and illustrated by Chika Shiina. It was serialized in Shogakukan's Cheese! magazine from October 2013 to May 2022, with twenty-four tankōbon volumes compiling the chapters released from March 2014 to 2022. A Japanese television drama series adaptation aired on TBS from July to September 2015.

In 2017, 37.5°C no Namida won the 62nd Shogakukan Manga Award in the shōjo category.

== Plot ==
Momoko Sugisaki is a child care worker who specializes in at-home day care for sick children. She struggles to learn how to respond to children who need her help. While learning that sometimes rules should be overlooked to help sick children, Momoko can tell how one could make a difference in children's lives.

== Characters ==
Momoko Sugisaki
Portrayed by: Misako Renbutsu
Motoharu Asahina
Portrayed by: Hiroki Narimiya
Chikara Yanagi
Portrayed by: Naohito Fujiki
Megumi Seki
Portrayed by: Miki Mizuno
Kensuke Shinohara
Portrayed by: Mokomichi Hayami
Koyuki Asahina
Portrayed by: Hana Matsushima
Koharu Asahina
Portrayed by: Rio Suzuki
Fumiko Asagiri
Portrayed by: Atsuko Asano
Yumika Ono
Portrayed by: Reina Triendl
Yuki Sugisaki
Portrayed by: Kensei Mikami
Kumiko Shinohara
Portrayed by: Saori Takizawa
Nishiki Sato
Portrayed by: Kazuhiko Nishimura
Yoko Sato
Portrayed by: Maki Kubota
Satomi Mori
Portrayed by: Noriko Nakagoshi
Risa Machii
Portrayed by: Shuri
Kanako Imai
Portrayed by: Natsuko Nagaike
Teppei Kato
Portrayed by: Yuya Kido
Sayaka Sato
Portrayed by: Risako Tanigawa
Seiichiro Sugisaki
Portrayed by: Tosei Ishida
Kaori Shimizu
Portrayed by: Yui Tanoue
Kenta Shinohara
Portrayed by: Ayumu Yokoyama
Masayo Tanaka
Portrayed by: Jun Miho
Kaito Mori
Portrayed by: Yusaku Hayashida

== Media ==
=== Manga ===
Written and illustrated by Chika Shiina, 37.5°C no Namida was serialized in Shogakukan's Cheese! magazine from October 24, 2013, to May 24, 2022. Its chapters were compiled into twenty-four tankōbon volumes from March 26, 2014, to June 24, 2022.

No.	Release date	ISBN
1	March 26, 2014	978-4-09-135822-6
2	July 25, 2014	978-4-09-136336-7
3	November 26, 2014	978-4-09-136489-0
4	June 26, 2015	978-4-09-137410-3
5	November 26, 2015	978-4-09-138010-4
6	March 25, 2016	978-4-09-138304-4
7	July 26, 2016	978-4-09-138569-7
8	November 25, 2016	978-4-09-138780-6
9	March 24, 2017	978-4-09-139140-7
10	July 26, 2017	978-4-09-139484-2
11	November 24, 2017	978-4-09-139690-7
12	March 26, 2018	978-4-09-139880-2
13	July 26, 2018	978-4-09-870151-3
14	November 26, 2018	978-4-09-870258-9
15	March 26, 2019	978-4-09-870402-6
16	July 26, 2019	978-4-09-870603-7
17	November 26, 2019	978-4-09-870657-0
18	February 26, 2020	978-4-09-870802-4
19	June 26, 2020	978-4-09-871006-5
20	November 26, 2020	978-4-09-871202-1
21	April 26, 2021	978-4-09-871257-1
22	September 24, 2021	978-4-09-871414-8
23	January 26, 2022	978-4-09-871572-5
24	June 24, 2022	978-4-09-871646-3

=== Drama ===
A Japanese television drama series adaptation aired on TBS from July 9 to September 17, 2015.

== Reception ==
37.5°C no Namida won the 62nd Shogakukan Manga Award in the shōjo category in 2017.

By April 2022, the series' cumulative circulation, including digital copies, had exceeded 3 million.
