= Erena =

Erena is a feminine given name. Ereña is a surname. Notable people with the name include:

== Given name ==
- Erena Baker (born 1984), New Zealand artist and photographer
- Erena Kaibara, alias of Hyo-sei (born 1973), Japanese voice actress and singer
- Erena Mikaere (born 1988), New Zealand netball international
- Erena Mizusawa (born 1992), Japanese model and actress
- Erena Ono (born 1993), Japanese singer
- Erena So (born 1997), Hong Kong pornographic actress

== Surname ==
- María Ereña (born 1996), Spanish singer

== Fictional characters ==
- Erena Amamiya, character in Japanese anime Star Twinkle PreCure

== See also ==
- Radio Erena, radio station in Paris, France
- Erena, more commonly known as Celestyal Crystal, a cruise ship
- Erena, a nickname for the Praga RN, a motor vehicle
- Ẹrẹ́nà, a month of the Yoruba calendar
