= Mocomichi Hayami =

Japanese actor, model, TV presenter, and chef

Mokomichi Hayami
- 速水 もこみち
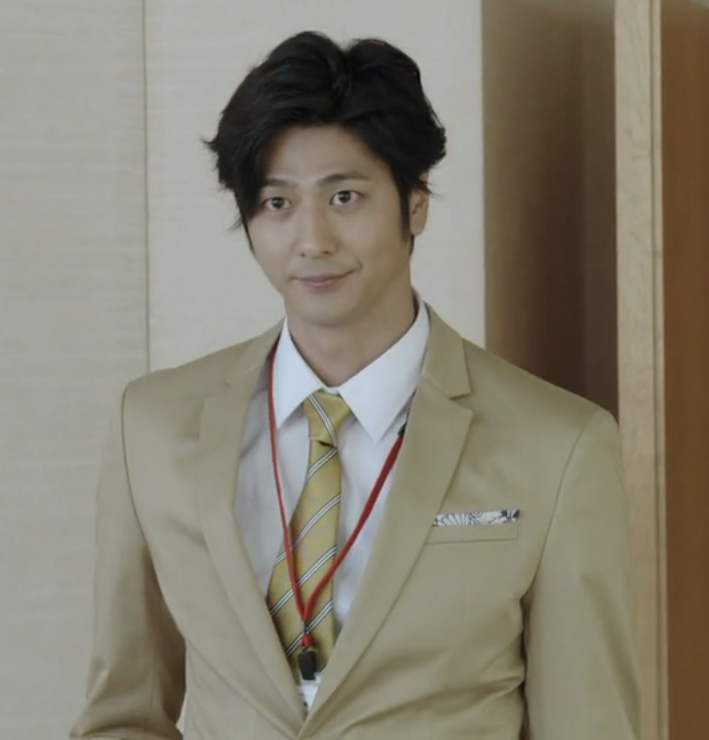
- Hayami in 2018
- Born: Mokomichi Omote; August 10, 1984 (age 42); Shibuya, Japan
- Other names: Moco; Mocomichi Hayami
- Education: Tokyo Metropolitan University; Tokyo Metropolitan Setagaya High School
- Occupations: Actor, model, cook, TV host
- Years active: 2000—present
- Known for: Zettai Kareshi as Tenjo Night
- Height: 186 cm (6 ft 1 in)
- Spouse: Aya Hirayama (m. 2019)
- Website: www.ken-on.co.jp/hayami/

Mocomichi Hayami (速水 もこみち, Hayami Mokomichi; born August 10, 1984) is a Japanese actor, chef, TV presenter, entrepreneur, and model.

== Biography ==
Hayami debuted in 2002 with the television series You're Under Arrest, and came to fame with Gokusen 2 in 2005. Hayami has appeared in popular TV dramas like Densha Otoko, Tokyo Tower, Zettai Kareshi (Absolute Boyfriend, as Night Tenjo), Shinzanmono, Kinkyū Torishirabeshitsu and 5-ji Kara 9-ji Made. He also featured in numerous TV commercials such as Daihatsu Tanto, Bourbon Petit, au by KDDI, Suntory, Nissin Foods, P&G, Kirin and Oji Nepia. He was the spokesperson for the fashion brand Edwin from 2006 to 2010.

Besides his acting career, Hayami is also well known for his cooking skills, especially after he starred as the host of Moco's Kitchen - a popular NTV show since 2011 and its spin-off, Mocomichi's Midnight Kitchen. He has his own line of kitchen utensils called Mocomichi Hayami and has published a series of cookbooks, including Love Meat (2015), Love Gohan (2016) and Love Pizza & Bread (2018). He won the 2013 Gourmand World Cookbook Award for Best Japanese Cookbook in Paris, France.

In July 2019, Hayami started an official YouTube channel called M's Table where he posts his original food recipes.

== Filmography ==
=== TV dramas ===
Year	Title	Role	Network	Ref.
2002	You're Under Arrest	Mokomichi	TV Asahi	
2003	Boku no Mahō Tsukai		NTV	
2003	Yankee Bokō ni Kaeru	Hideo	TBS	
2004	Tokyo Wankei		Fuji TV	
2005	Brother Beat	Riku Sakurai	TBS	
2005	Densha Otoko	Aoyama Keisuke	Fuji TV	
2005	Gokusen 2	Tsuchiya Hikaru	NTV	
2005	Ame to Yume no Ato ni	Hayakawa Hokuto	TV Asahi	
2006	Regatta	Makoto Ozawa		
2006	Rondo	Kazama Ryugo	TBS	
2006	Teru Teru Ashita	(ep. 10)	TV Asahi	
2007	Hataraki Man	Tanaka Kunio	NTV	
2007	Jotei	Shiratori Takuya (ep. 8)	TV Asahi	
2007	Dōbutsu 119	Nakadai Mituya	NTV	
2007	Tokyo Tower	Nakagawa Masaya / Boku	Fuji TV	
2008	Oh! My Girl!	Yamashita Kotaro	NTV	
2008	Zettai Kareshi	Night Tenjo	Fuji TV	
2009	Zettai Kareshi SP	Night Tenjo	Fuji TV	
2009	Kochikame	Keiichi Nakagawa	Fuji TV	
2009	Love Connector - Romantic Craftsman		BeeTV	
2010	Shinzanmono	Kishida Kazuya (ep. 8–10)	TBS	
2010	Hammer Session!	Hachisuka Goro (Otowa No.4)	TBS	
2011	Rebound	Taiichi Imai	NTV	
2011	Kono Sekai no Katasumi ni	Tetsu	NTV	
2012	Houkago wa Mystery Totomo ni	Hiromi Ishizaki	TBS	
2012	Jun to Ai	Tadashi Kano	NHK	
2014	Mokomichi no Midnight Kitchen	himself	NTV	
2014	Kiseki no Kyōshitsu	Hisashi Nishikawa	NTV	
2014	Hell Teacher Nūbē	Kyōsuke Tamamo	NTV	
2014	Gunshi Kanbei	Mori Tahei	Taiga drama	
2014–2025	Emergency Interrogation Room	Tetsuji Watanabe	5 seasons	
2015	37.5°C no Namida	Kensuke Shinohara	TBS	
2015	5-ji Kara 9-ji Made: Watashi ni Koi Shita Obōsan	Arthur Lange	Fuji TV	
2016	Hajimemashite, Ashite Imasu	Takumi Umeda	TV Asahi	
2017	Honjitsu wa, Ohigara mo Yoku	Kamatari Wada	WOWOW	
2017	Tokyo Tarareba Girls	Yuichi Okuda (Ep. 5–6)	NTV	
2017	2018	The Black Company	Katsuya Ozeki	Fuji TV
2019	Legal V Ex-lawyer Shoko Takanashi (Rigaru V: Gen Bengoshi Takanashi Shoko)	Satoshi Omine (Ep. 8–9)	TV Asahi	

=== Film ===
Year	Title	Role	Notes	Ref.
2006	Rough	Keisuke Yamato	Lead role	
2018	My Little Monster	Mitsuyoshi "Mitchan" Misawa		
2025	Emergency Interrogation Room: The Final Movie	Tetsuji Watanabe		

=== TV shows & events ===
Year	Title	Role	Notes	Ref.
2012	Hayami Mokomichi's Italian Food Journey	Host		
2012	Hayami Mokomichi - Turkish Food Travelling	Host		

== Books ==
Time	Title	Type	Publisher
7.2010	Hayami Mokomichi ga tsukuru 50 no reshipi Kimi to tabetara, kitto oishī (Mocomichi Hayami's 50 Delicious Recipes to eat with you)	Cookbook	Magazine House
5.2011	MOCO meshi ~ kimi o egao ni suru ryōri (Moco Dishes to make you smile)	Cookbook	Magazine House
9.2011	Hayami Mokomichi MOCO's Kitchen	Cookbook	NTV
12.2011	Hayami Mokomichi MOCO's Kitchen VOL.2	Cookbook	NTV
3.2012	Hayami Mokomichi MOCO's Kitchen VOL.3	Cookbook	NTV
4.2012	Trattoria MOCO	Cookbook	Magazine House
6.2012	Hayami Mokomichi MOCO's Kitchen VOL.4	Cookbook	NTV
9.2012	Hayami Mokomichi MOCO's Kitchen VOL.5	Cookbook	NTV
9.2012	NHK's Drama Guide Novel Jun to Ai - Part 1	Drama Guide	NHK
11.2012	Special Edition: MOCO's PASTA & SALAD	Cookbook	NTV
11.2012	Special Edition: MOCO's Otsumami (MOCO's SNACK)	Cookbook	NTV
01.2013	Hayami Mokomichi MOCO's Kitchen VOL.6	Cookbook	NTV
01.2013	NHK's Drama Guide Novel Jun to Ai - Part 2	Drama Guide	NHK
3.2013	Hayami Mokomichi MOCO's Kitchen VOL.7	Cookbook	NTV
7.2013	Hayami Mokomichi MOCO's Kitchen VOL.8	Cookbook	NTV
11.2013	Hayami Mokomichi MOCO's Kitchen New Recipe Collection	Cookbook	Gakken
12.2013	2014 NHK's Taiga Drama Gunshi Kanbei Complete Reading	Drama Novel	Sankei Shimbun Publishing
12.2013	NHK's Taiga Drama Story Gunshi Kanbei - Part 1	Drama Novel	NHK
3.2014	Hayami Mokomichi MOCO's Kitchen New Recipe Collection Vol.2	Cookbook	Gakken
7.2014	Hayami Mokomichi MOCO's Kitchen New Recipe Collection Vol.3	Cookbook	Gakken
11.2014	Hayami Mokomichi MOCO's Kitchen New Recipe Collection Vol.4	Cookbook	Gakken
3.2015	MOCO's Kitchen: Special Edition	Cookbook	Takarajimasha
3.2016	MOCO's Kitchen LOVE MEAT	Cookbook	Pia
3.2017	MOCO's Kitchen LOVE GOHAN	Cookbook	Pia
3.2018	MOCO's Kitchen LOVE PIZZA & BREAD: Popular Recipes of Bread and Pizza	Cookbook	Pia
10.2018	O bentō baiburu - Bento Box Bible by Mocomichi Hayami	Cookbook	President
5.2019	Karada ni ī koto - Good Things for the Body	Magazine	

== Personal life ==
=== Relationships ===
On August 8, 2019, Hayami and actress Aya Hirayama were married in an intimate ceremony attended only by family and close friends. The wedding reception took place in a private banquet hall in Tokyo.
