= Absolute Boyfriend =

Japanese manga series

- Cover of the first volume

絶対彼氏。 (Zettai Kareshi)
- Genre: Romance
- Manga
- Written by: Yuu Watase
- Published by: Shogakukan
- English publisher: AUS: Madman Entertainment; NA: Viz Media; SG: Chuang Yi
- Magazine: Shōjo Comic
- Original run: March 25, 2003 – February 25, 2005
- Volumes: 6
- Television drama
- Absolute Boyfriend (2008, Japan); Absolute Boyfriend (2012, Taiwan); My Absolute Boyfriend (2019, South Korea)

Absolute Boyfriend (Japanese: 絶対彼氏。, Hepburn: Zettai Kareshi) is a Japanese manga series written and illustrated by Yuu Watase, first serialized in Shōjo Comic. Chuang Yi licensed it for an English release in Singapore, with the first volume released in March 2005. Viz Media licensed the series for an English release in North America, serializing the series in its Shojo Beat manga anthology as well as releasing the volumes.

The manga series was adapted into an 11-episode live-action drama series that aired in Japan in 2008. A 13-episode Taiwanese adaption aired in 2012, and a 40-episode South Korean adaptation aired in 2019 under the title My Absolute Boyfriend.

== Plot ==
Riiko Izawa never had a boyfriend and has been rejected by every boy she ever had a crush on. When Riiko returns a lost cell phone to an strangely-dressed salesman, she mentions wanting a boyfriend. Wanting thank her, he directs her to his company's website, Kronos Heaven. As Riiko visits the site, she finds it is a site to create someone's perfect lover. Thinking it is a game, Riiko customizes and accidentally orders one. The next day, her new lover arrives. Following the instruction manual, she kisses him to wake him up, which configures him to be in love with only her, and names him "Night". Three days later, Riiko is shocked to learn that she only had him for a free trial for 72 hours. The salesman, Gaku Namikiri, tells her that Riiko must now pay ¥100,000,000 for Night. However, they will waive the fee if she helps them to collect data about how women think and feel to help perfect future models.

Riiko must keep Night's true nature a secret from everyone around her. She also soon finds herself in a love triangle between Night and her childhood friend Soshi, who declares his love for her out of fear he will lose her. As the series progresses, Night begins to develop real human emotions, enabling him to truly love Riiko but also resulting in system malfunctions. When Riiko almost loses Night due to the malfunctions, she realizes that he is the one she really loves. She apologizes to Soshi, who moves to Spain with his brother to live with their dad. Night and Riiko spend a few happy weeks together, during which they go on dates, get their picture taken together, and purchase matching rings as symbols of their undying love.

As the series ends, Night begins to grow sleepier. The problems developed by him exceeding his abilities eventually causes his machinery to stop working, resulting in his "death". Before Night died, he wrote a letter directed to Soshi telling him what was happening and asking him to take care of Riiko. Night also sends his ring, which Riiko noticed he has not been wearing immediately prior to his death. In the letter, Night tells Riiko that she does not have to cry for him anymore but always smile, so she laughs and forever treasures her rings and memories of Night.

== Characters ==
Night Tenjou (天城ナイト, Tenjō Naito)
Played by: Mokomichi Hayami
Nightly 01 (Night) is a cybernetic doll ordered by Riiko Izawa. As such, he is the "perfect boyfriend": charming, dependable, intelligent, athletic, good-looking, sensitive, and completely devoted. Designed to fulfill intimate relations for a woman, Night constantly offers to have sex with Riiko, who steadfastly declines the offer. Not knowing a sense of privacy, he often takes off his clothes under the slightest prompting of him having to sleep with Riiko even at public places, and often tries to hug or kiss Riiko, which makes her uncomfortable and embarrassed.
While Night initially functioned as Riiko's perfect boyfriend due to his programming, his relationship with Riiko eventually makes him develop true human-like emotions, culminating in him having his own will. Even if Night's allegiance to Riiko can be switched by means of kissing, his relationship with her is so strong that when a customer of a host club makes him her lover, he still remembers Riiko, albeit as an ex-girlfriend. Upon kissing Riiko again, Night quickly switches allegiance to her while completely forgetting his experiences with the customer before. Eventually, he grows to love Riiko genuinely and trespasses orders given to him by Kronos Heaven.
However, Night is secretly dying from battery failure as his relationship with Riiko goes intimate, although he does not want to make Riiko worry by informing her. Before he shuts down, he writes a letter for Sōshi to return for Riiko, while telling Riiko not to cry and to move on from him.
Riiko Izawa (井沢リイコ, Izawa Riiko)
Played by: Saki Aibu
Riiko is a young, flat-chested 16-year-old girl who has bad luck with boys. When she helps a strange salesman named Gaku Namikiri, she ends up ordering a cybernetic boyfriend. Despite being initially shy around her new boyfriend, Riiko begins to fall in love with him while also finding herself struggling with her new admirer, Soshi Asamoto. Riiko is rather naïve, clumsy, and simple-minded, but kindhearted, hardworking, and serious.
Riiko does not want to admit she is in love with Night and constantly reminds herself that he is just a doll. However, this is not completely true because she gets jealous or even angry when he flirts with other girls for "data".
Sōshi Asamoto (浅元ソウシ, Asamoto Sōshi)
Played by: Hiro Mizushima
Sōshi is Riiko's childhood friend who lives with his brother as their father often travels. He watches over Riiko and takes care of her while her parents work far away. Sōshi initially treated Riiko as a good friend, but realizes that he has stronger feelings for Riiko and confesses his love to her.
Gaku Namikiri (ガク·ナミキリ)
Played by: Kuranosuke Sasaki
Gaku is a salesman for Kronos Heaven, a company specializing in making highly realistic robots, or "figures". Though usually businesslike and down-to-earth, Gaku is often mistaken for a cosplayer because of his odd manner of dress. When Riiko cannot return Night or pay the bill for him, Gaku allows her to keep him so Night can collect data on how to become a better lover for use in future models. Whenever there is a problem with Night, Gaku is the one to fix him. Gaku keeps close tabs on the progress in the relationship between Riiko and Night, and he often appears randomly out of nowhere, ie. out of Riiko's closet, mostly for comic relief. A stereotypical Japanese salesman, he speaks with a heavy Kansai dialect and tends to interject Spanish words in his conversations. Gaku's family owns a business of selling takoyaki. At the end of the series, Gaku quits his job at Kronos Heaven to inherit his family business. Gaku is the one whom Night trusts to give his letter asking Soushi to return for Riiko once the latter has calmed down from her grief of losing Night.
Mika Itō (伊藤ミカ, Itō Mika)
Played by: Natsuhi Ueno
Mika is Rikko's frenemy and classmate of Riiko who has been friends with her since middle school. She attracts the attention of many boys, whom she occasionally dates. Mika offers support and reassurance when Riiko feels miserable after being rejected by Ishizeki. However, it is later shown that Mika is the reason why boys always reject Riiko after she asks them out, as Mika has been spreading rumors around school that Riiko is slutty and goes out with boys for their money. Mika has been dating Ishizeki ever since Riiko took interest in him, and quickly breaks up with him once he has rejected Riiko's confession, as she is only interested in things that belong to other people. Subsequently, Mika sets Night's violent fanclub on Riiko and tries to make Night break up with Riiko and date her instead. At the end, her scheme backfires, and she stops being friends with Riiko.
Satori Miyabe (宮部サトリ, Miyabe Satori)
Played by: Miki Maya (Japan)
Satori is Riiko's aloof friend, the first person learn that Riiko has been lured to be humiliated by Night's fan club led by Mika during an outdoor trip. Riiko later finds out that Miyabe is wealthy due to having worked as a stock trader, which she has interest to take part on to pay Night's maintenance bills. Miyabe reveals to Night that ever since her parents' deaths, she has lost her will to fall in love with anyone, but can be convinced by Night to fall in love again.
Yuki Shirasaki (白崎ユキ, Shirasaki Yuki)
Played by: Eisuke Sasai
Gaku's superior at Kronos Heaven, Yuki sends a Nightly 02 model, Toshiki, to seduce and have sex with Riiko, due to Night's repeated failure to sleep with Riiko. He at first pretends to be Toshiki's younger brother who knocks out Night by whispering a code to his ear so Toshiki can have a chance to seduce Riiko. He drops his disguise just before Night's inevitable fight with Toshiki, stating that whichever model that successfully sleeps with Riiko will be the finished product, while the failure one will be disposed. After Night wins the fight, Yuki shuts down Toshiki so it can be reprogrammed. However, when Night runs away from Kronos Heaven during his maintenance period, Yuki is sent alongside Gaku by his superiors to capture him, due to Night's possible danger as a doll with human-like emotions. Despite his attempts to capture him, including sending another model of Nightly 01, he fails and is convinced by Gaku to give up the act.
Toshiki Shirasaki (白崎トシキ, Shirasaki Toshiki)
Played by: Tsuyoshi Abe (Japan)
Another line of cybernetic dolls manufactured by Kronos Heaven in the same liege as Night, Toshiki is part of the Nightly 02 series, which is technically more advanced than the Nightly 01 series. He carries a high resemblance to Night in facial features, body structure, and even wears the same jewelry, although he is much stronger and has better reflexes than him. Disguising as Toshiki Murakami (村上トシキ, Murakami Toshiki), Riiko's first crush, he is sent to replace Night as Riiko's boyfriend due to Night's failure to sleep with Riiko, with his benefactor, Yuki, under the guise of his little brother. During Night and Riiko's stay at a hotel, Toshiki manages to knock out Riiko upon kissing her, then claims that he had fun with her the next morning; while the two have not in fact slept together, Riiko believes so, and this temporarily creates a strain between her and Night. Toshiki uses the opportunity to seduce Riiko, but he is stopped by Night, who tears his arm after a brutal fight. Toshiki is shut down by Yuki and taken away for testing and reprogramming. Later, he becomes the boyfriend of a wealthy girl and establishes a friendship with Riiko and Night.
Masaki Asamoto (浅元マサキ, Asamoto Masaki)
Played by: Shunsuke Nakamura
Masaki is Sōshi's little brother who supports his brother to date Riiko, much to Soushi's embarrassment. At the end of the series, alongside Sōshi, Masaki moves to Spain to rejoin with his father and stays there permanently while Soushi decides to return to Japan six months later.
Ishizeki (石関)
Played by: Nobuo Kyou
Ishozeki boy whom Riiko had a crush on since the school entrance. Riiko confesses her love for Ishizeki at the start of the series, but he rejects, saying that he is already in love with another girl. It is later revealed that the girl is in fact Riiko's friend, Mika, who breaks up with him in return and is the one who made him as well as every boy Riiko had tried to date believe that Riiko is a gold digger. A harsh Ishizeki discusses his rejection to his friends, which Riiko overhears, and later publicly humiliates Riiko; he receives his comeuppance when both Night and Soushi beat him up. Ishizeki then calls Riiko a "slut" upon knowing her relationship with Night; Night once again beats him and his friends while telling them never to mess with him or Riiko again.
Yoshiharu Izawa (井沢ヨシハル, Izawa Yoshiharu) and Makiko Izawa (井沢マキコ, Izawa Makiko)
Played by: Ryou Iwamatsu and Hitomi Takahashi
Yoshiharu and Makiko are Riiko's parents who work overseas and seldom return to Japan, forcing Riiko to live in an apartment by herself. Despite their rare visits for their daughter, the couple care for Riiko's well-being. They were first shown in a comedic segment when Riiko, in her initial shock of seeing Night arriving naked, reminiscences that she used to innocently ask her father about male genitalia when she was a child. The couple returns to Japan midway through the series and expresses surprise that their daughter is living with a man. Trying to get rid of Night, Yoshiharu attempts to make Riiko attend a dinner with Sōshi, whom he particularly wants in becoming his son-in-law, but the plan falls through. The couple remains unaware of Night's actual state as they take their leave from Japan.
Muyai (ムヤイ)
Played by: Manbuku Kin
Muyai is Riiko and Soushi's boss at a Vietnamese restaurant named "Manteiv" who speaks in a mangled English. He is later revealed to be another manufactured robot of Kronos Heaven, tasked to capture Night after his escape from the company.
Absulte (アブソリュート)
Played by: Ryuhei Matsuda
Absulte is a waiter at a Vietnamese restaurant who initially appears to be a newcomer, but is later revealed to be a savior.

== Media ==
=== Manga ===
Written by Yuu Watase, Absolute Boyfriend premiered in Japan in the March 2003 issue of Shōjo Comic. It appeared monthly until the thirty-fifth and final chapter was published in the February 2005 issue. The chapters were published in six collected volumes by Shogakukan with the first volume released on October 25, 2003, and the final volume released on February 25, 2005.

Absolute Boyfriend is licensed for both English and Chinese releases in Singapore by Chuang Yi, which has released all six volumes of the series. Madman Entertainment subsequently imported and republished the English-translated Chuang Yi volumes in Australia from May 17 until October 11, 2006. In North America, the series was licensed for an English translated release by Viz Media. It was one of the first six manga series Viz included in the June 2005 premiere issue of the company's new manga anthology Shojo Beat. It continued to be serialized in Shojo Beat until it reached its conclusion in the March 2008 issue.

=== Volume list ===
No.	Original release date	Original ISBN	English release date	English ISBN
1	October 25, 2003	4091384617	March 2005 (Singapore); May 17, 2006 (Australia); February 7, 2006 (North America)	981-260-381-6 (Singapore); 978-981-4204-28-6 (Australia); 1-4215-0016-7 (North America)
"The Lover Shop"; "Three-Day Boyfriend"; "The Purchase"; "The Million-Dollar Man"; "Dinner"; "Let's Go To School!"
2	January 26, 2004	4091384625	June 21, 2006 (Australia); August 1, 2006 (North America)	981-260-411-1 (Singapore); 978-981-4204-29-3 (Australia); 1-4215-0568-1 (North America)
"School Trip"; "Friends"; "Thank You"; "The Girl You Love"; "The Kiss"; "Ex-Girlfriend"
3	April 26, 2004	4091384633	July 26, 2006 (Australia); February 6, 2007 (North America)	981-260-454-5 (Singapore); 978-981-4204-67-5 (Australia); 978-1-4215-1003-3 (North America)
"Return"; "Sex"; "The Use Of Force"; "Stay With Me"; "My Real Feelings"; "Unforgivable"
4	June 26, 2004	4091384641	August 16, 2006 (Australia); August 7, 2007 (North America)	981-260-454-5 (Singapore); 978-981-4204-68-2 (Australia); 1-4215-1004-9 (North America)
"First Crush"; "A Big Problem"; "Secret"; "The New Model"; "Maintenance"; "Open Your Eyes"
5	October 26, 2004	409138465X	September 6, 2006 (Australia); February 5, 2008 (North America)	981-260-551-7 (Singapore); 978-981-269-090-6 (Australia); 1-4215-1535-0 (North America)
"The Tiny Boyfriend"; "Both"; "My Love For You"; "A Nurse Job"; "I'm Sorry"; "The War Over The Girlfriend"
6	February 25, 2005	4091384668	October 11, 2006 (Australia); May 6, 2008 (North America)	981-260-654-8 (Singapore); 978-981-269-091-3 (Australia); 1-4215-1562-8 (North America)
"Kind Lies"; "Someday"; "The Final Act: Eternal Boyfriend"; "Extra Stories: I Won't Let You Be A Star!, Aromatic"

=== Drama CD ===
A drama CD based on this manga was released under the title Zettai Kareshi - Figure Darling in Japan by Marine Entertainment on August 25, 2004.

=== Live-action television series ===
==== Japanese adaptation ====
A live-action adaptation of the manga began airing on Fuji TV on April 15, 2008, and ran for eleven episodes until its conclusion on June 24, 2008. In the live-action version, Riiko Izawa is an office lady in search of a boyfriend, and she ends up in possession of a "robot" known as Night Tenjo, who is programmed to be the perfect boyfriend. However, this creates a love triangle with a distinguished young man at her company who also has feelings for her. Riiko is played by Saki Aibu, Night is played by Mokomichi Hayami, and Soshi Asamoto is played by Hiro Mizushima.

==== Taiwanese adaptation ====
On October 5, 2010, a Taiwanese live-action adaptation of Absolute Boyfriend (絕對達令; Jue Dui Da Ling) was filmed, starring Taiwanese singer-actor Wu Chun as Night and South Korean actress Ku Hye-sun as Riiko. On May 3, 2011, Jiro Wang replaced fellow Fahrenheit band member Wu Chun as the male lead of the drama series, now titled Absolute Darling. The series premiered on April 1, 2012, on FTV.

==== Korean adaptation ====
On October 18, 2011, there were unconfirmed reports of a Korean adaptation titled Absolutely Him (Korean: 절대 그이; RR: Jeoldae Geuyi) starring actress Kim Ha-neul as the female lead opposite singer-actor T.O.P. However, there are no follow-up news on the production. On February 23, 2018, according to the online platform Naver and media news site Newsen, Korean cable network OCN is in talks to adapt the manga with "Romantic Comedy King" as its working title. On March 15, Song Ji-hyo and Chun Jung-myung were cast as leads. On April 10, Song Ji-hyo rejected the role while Yeo Jin-goo was in talks and taking consideration. On May 30, reports confirmed Yeo Jin-goo and Girl's Day member Bang Min-ah as leads while Hong Jong-hyun was still in talks. Their first script reading was held on June 22, 2018, and filming began in July. The series was written by Yang Hyuk-moon (Secret Healer) and directed by Jung Jung-hwa. The drama finished filming in December 2018 and is airing on SBS from May 2019.
