= Peach Girl (film) =

- Poster
- Kanji: ピーチガール
- Directed by: Kōji Shintoku
- Screenplay by: Junpei Yamaoka
- Based on: Peach Girl by Miwa Ueda
- Produced by: Hirotaka Aragaki; Kiyokazu Ishizuka
- Starring: Mizuki Yamamoto; Kei Inoo; Mackenyu; Mei Nagano; Yuika Motokariya; Kensei Mikami; Takeshi Masu; Momoko Kikuchi
- Cinematography: Takashi Komatsu
- Edited by: Yū Shimoda
- Music by: Koichi Tsutaya
- Production company: Fine Entertainment
- Distributed by: Shochiku
- Release date: 20 May 2017 (Japan)
- Running time: 116 minutes
- Country: Japan
- Language: Japanese

Peach Girl (Japanese: ピーチガール, Hepburn: Pīchigāru) is a 2017 Japanese romantic comedy-drama film based on the manga series of the same name by Miwa Ueda, produced by Fine Entertainment and distributed by Shochiku. The film was directed by Kōji Shintoku, written by Junpei Yamaoka, and stars Mizuki Yamamoto, Kei Inoo, Mackenyu, Mei Nagano, Yuika Motokariya, Kensei Mikami, Takeshi Masu and Momoko Kikuchi. It was released in Japan by Shochiku on 20 May 2017. The theme song for this film is "Call Me Maybe" by Carly Rae Jepsen. On April 1, 2017, the creator Ueda stated that she had drawn manga versions of the film's posters.

== Plot ==
Momo Adachi (Mizuki Yamamoto) is a female high school student, always at a loss because she's mistaken as an "easy bimbo girl" due to her appearance. Furthermore, somehow a rumor spreads that she had kissed the most popular boy in her grade, Kairi Okayasu (Kei Inoo) and she has to deal with being the target of harassment by other girls who like him. But ever since junior high school, Momo has actually been fond of a boy called Toji. He gives his all to the baseball club, and although Momo can watch Toji from a distance, she is never able to reveal her feelings.

== Cast ==
- Mizuki Yamamoto as Momo Adachi
- Kei Inoo as Kairi Okayasu
- Mackenyu as Kazuya Tojigamori
- Mei Nagano as Sae Kashiwagi
- Yuika Motokariya as Misao Aki
- Kensei Mikami as Ryo Okayasu
- Takeshi Masu as Takashi Okayasu
- Momoko Kikuchi as Sakurako Adachi
- Daisuke Kikuta as Goro Ooji / Jigoro

== Reception ==
The film was third place on its opening weekend in Japan, earning US$1.29 million.
