= Hot Road (film) =

2014 Japanese romance film

- Poster
- ホットロード
- Directed by: Takahiro Miki
- Written by: Taku Tsumugi
- Screenplay by: Tomoko Yoshida
- Based on: Hot Road by Taku Tsumugi
- Produced by: Shigeaki Yoshida; Naoto Fujimura
- Starring: Rena Nōnen; Hiroomi Tosaka
- Cinematography: Kosuke Yamada
- Edited by: Naoya Bando
- Music by: mio-sotido
- Production company: Shochiku
- Distributed by: Shochiku
- Release date: August 16, 2014
- Running time: 119 minutes
- Country: Japan
- Language: Japanese
- Box office: ¥2.52 billion

Hot Road (ホットロード,Hotto rôdo) is a 2014 Japanese romance film directed by Takahiro Miki from a screenplay by Tomoko Yoshida, based on Taku Tsumugi's shōjo manga of the same title, which was serialized from 1986 to 1987. It stars Rena Nōnen and Hiroomi Tosaka, with Ryōhei Suzuki, Rina Ōta, Yukiyoshi Ozawa, and Yoshino Kimura in supporting roles. The story is of a romance between a troubled girl played by Rena Nōnen, who received no love from her remarrying mother, and a Bōsōzoku's future leader played by Hiroomi Tosaka. The theme song of the film is Yutaka Ozaki's "Oh My Little Girl".

Released on August 16, 2014, Hot Road received a lot of attention as the first film since Rena Nōnen earned her fame through Amachan in 2013 and Sandaime J Soul Brothers, the dance and vocal group in which Hiroomi Tosaka served as one of the vocalists, released 2014's hit single "R.Y.U.S.E.I." that soared the group to success. It was well received by the public, grossing 2.52 billion yen in total, while Rena Nōnen and Hiroomi Tosaka also won a few "Best Newcomer Award" with it.

== Plot ==
Kazuki Miyaichi, a 14-year-old girl who lives with her mother in a house that lacks a single photo of her late father. She is heartbroken because she is not the person she hoped to be.

One day her best friend, who was also having trouble fitting in at school, invited her to join her and have fun with those Bōsōzoku boys at night.

At night in Shonan, Kazuki meets Hiroshi Haruyama, a member of Bōsōzoku gang "Nights".

At first, they dislike and hurt each other, but Kazuki finds herself in a world where Haruyama is a part of, as they both feel a sense of isolation. Despite her mixed feeling of comfort and confusion at the same time, she is rapidly drawn to Haruyama. Meanwhile, Haruyama is also attracted to Kazuki's innocence, but when he becomes the leader of the Nights...He gets caught up in a war with a rival team.

== Cast ==
- Rena Nōnen as Kazuki Miyaichi, a troubled 14-year-old-girl who is lonely and sad. She lives with her mother after his father died when she was two years old. She rebelled against her mother after she found out that her mother has continued to date Suzuki. Feeling unloved by her mother and fearing that she was not wanted by anyone, she turned to delinquency.
- Hiroomi Tosaka as Hiroshi Haruyama, a 16-year-old member of Bōsōzoku gang "Nights". His mother divorced his father and remarried, and he did not get along with his father, so he left home to live on his own. Instead of going to high school, he works part-time at a gas station to make a living. He rides a Honda CBR400F with a Moriwaki Foresight assembly tube and BEET tail cowl. A CBR400F modified to the same specifications is known as the "Haruyama Spec". He hopes to be the leader of "Nights" one day.
- Yoshino Kimura as Kazuki's mother.After her husband's death, she raised Kazuki by herself. Unable to be with Suzuki, the man she had been in love with since high school, she married Kazuki's father. She is still in love with Suzuki.
- Yukiyoshi Ozawa as Suzuki, the man who is divorcing his wife to marry Kazuki's mother. He is very rich.
- Ryōhei Suzuki as Tōru Tamami, the leader of "Nights". He is considering retiring from the gang and names Haruyama as his successor so that he can marry his girlfriend Hiroko.
- Rina Ōta as Hiroko, Tōru's girlfriend and she cares for Eri when she was in Yokoyama. When she first joined the "Nights", she was rough and careless, but after she met Tōru, she became more gentle.
- Haruka as Eri, a friend of Kazuki. She transferred from Yokohama to Kazuki's school, and the two girls soon became friends. She introduced Kazuki to those boys of "Nights".

Motoki Ochiai appears as Richard, Yūki Yamada appears as Kinpa, both of them are friends of Haruyama and members of "Nights". As for the members of Bakutō, the rival gang of "Nights", SWAY portrays Leader Akane, Yuya Endo portrays NO.2 Nagayama. Machiko Washio plays teacher Oba-sama. Toru Nomaguchi plays a doctor.Gō Rijū plays teacher Takatsu. Haruyama's mother is portrayed by Miyuki Matsuda.

== Production ==
Though manga Hot Road has been a hit in the 80s, Taku Tsumugi refused to make a feature film version of Hot Road many times because she thought everyone were entitled to have their own version of Hot Road in mind, and no one else could touch it. She finally gave the project of a live-action film of Hot Road a go after more than 25 years, when she knew Rena Nōnen from the 2012 film Karasu no Oyayubi, and trusted her with the role of the heroine of the story, which was even before Rena Nōnen won her fame with TV drama Amachan. She also chose Hiroomi Tosaka to play the hero Hiroshi Haruyama, stating that they are the only two people in the world who can bring Kazuki and Haruyama to life, as she saw Kazuki and Haruyama in Rena Nōnen and Hiroomi Tosaka, when she had thought that she would never be able to meet anyone like Kazuki and Haruyama for years. Being the vocalist of dance and vocal group Sandaime J Soul Brothers, this was the first acting try for Tosaka. At first, he hesitated to take the role, afraid that being an actor would have a bad impact on his role as a vocalist for the group, but he was encouraged by Takahiro, who is also a vocalist and has acted in TV dramas. At last, he decided to take this new challenge of acting and make it the next step for him to improve himself.

To prepare the film, Taku Tsumugi supervised the script of herself, and Rena Nōnen dyed her hair brown for the first time in her life to portrayed Kazuki. To rebuild the world of the 1980s, Art director Hidefumi Hanatani got his inspiration from the original manga and put things that were popular in 1980s in the home Kazuki lived. He also use the less possibility of ornament to present the "inorganic" home where Kazuki lived with her mother. The production team also rebuilt the motorcycles Haruyma rode, Honda CBR400F and CB400F, the way they were in the 1980s with the help of motorcycle shop "Uematsu".

Hot road began shooting in November 2013 and finishing shooting in December. It was mainly shot in the area around Enoshima, mainly Kamakura and Fujisawa, Kanagawa. Though the winter on Enoshima was cold, actors had to put on clothes for summer and eat ice cream to finish those scenes that happened in summer.

== Release ==
The film had its premiere at Shinjuku Piccadilly Cinema in Tokyo on July 13, 2014, and opened in Japan on August 16 of the same year on 302 screens around Japan.

=== Marketing ===
Hot Road was announced on October 17, 2013, as the next production for Rena Nōnen when she became a national hit with TV drama Amachan. On October 29, it was announced that Hiroomi Tosaka would play the hero of this love story. On March 18, 2014, an event reporting the production of the film was held, and Rena Nōnen, Hiroomi Tosaka attended the event with director Takahiro Miki. It was announced at the event that the theme song of the film would be Yutaka Ozaki's "Oh My Little Girl". The full cast of the film was announced on May 13, 2014. On May 26, the poster of the film was released, and the first trailer of the film was released on May 30. The film had its premiere on July 13, 2014, with Rena Nōnen, Hiroomi Tosaka, Ryōhei Suzuki, Rina Ōta, Motoki Ochiai attending. A blue carpet event was held alongside the premiere on Shinjuku Ohdoori. It was also the 21st birthday of Rena Nōnen, so Yoshino Kimura appeared as a cake as a surprise, who played Rena Nōnen's mother in the film. On August 6, A premiere event for students was held in Nakamura junior & senior girls' high school in Kōtō, Tokyo. On October 11, 2014, a promotional video with Yutaka Ozaki's "I LOVE YOU" as its soundtrack was released, when the song was announced to be the image song of Hot Road. On August 16, Main cast of the film attend a stage greetings event in Tokyo, and with 216 cinemas around Japan, live screening the event, about 15 thousand people watch the stage greetings event.

== Reception ==
=== Box office ===
The film was number-two on its opening weekend, behind Stand By Me Doraemon, with ¥389 million in Japan. It earned a total of ¥2.47 billion (US$22.9 million) at the Japanese box office, becoming the 9th highest-grossing Japanese film released that year in the country and the 15th highest-grossing film of the year in the country.

=== Critical reception ===
The film had generally positive reviews, with Japanese critic Kiichiro Yanagishita describing it as a poem of Rena Nōnen. Critic Yumi Eguchi also praised the film for being able to present those mixed feelings of the characters even without dialogues.
