= List of Peach Girl chapters =

The cover of the first volume of Peach Girl as published by Kodansha on January 13, 1998, in Japan.

The chapters of Peach Girl are written and illustrated by Miwa Ueda.

Peach Girl was licensed by Tokyopop for an English-language release in North America. Currently the series is out-of-print.

== Volume list ==
=== Peach Girl ===
No.	Original release date	Original ISBN	North American release date	North American ISBN
01	January 13, 1998	978-4-06-303094-5	April 16, 2001	978-1-892213-62-4
Chapters 1–4
02	June 12, 1998	978-4-06-303109-6	August 10, 2001	978-1-892213-09-9
Chapters 5–8
03	November 13, 1998	978-4-06-303132-4	January 15, 2002	978-1-931514-13-2
04	February 12, 1999	978-4-06-303143-0	May 21, 2002	978-1-931514-14-9
05	June 11, 1999	978-4-06-303156-0	July 23, 2002	978-1-931514-15-6
06	November 12, 1999	978-4-06-303171-3	September 24, 2002	978-1-931514-16-3
07	March 13, 2000	978-4-06-303184-3	November 19, 2002	978-1-931514-17-0
08	August 8, 2000	978-4-06-341202-4	January 14, 2003	978-1-931514-18-7

=== Peach Girl: Change of Heart ===
No.	Original release date	Original ISBN	North American release date	North American ISBN
01	December 13, 2000	978-4-06-341215-4	March 11, 2003	978-1-931514-19-4
02	April 13, 2001	978-4-06-341231-4	May 13, 2003	978-1-59182-195-3
03	August 8, 2001	978-4-06-341246-8	July 15, 2003	978-1-59182-196-0
04	January 11, 2002	978-4-06-341266-6	September 16, 2006	978-1-59182-197-7
05	May 13, 2002	978-4-06-341281-9	November 11, 2003	978-1-59182-198-4
06	September 13, 2002	978-4-06-341302-1	January 6, 2004	978-1-59182-495-4
07	January 10, 2003	978-4-06-341319-9	March 2, 2004	978-1-59182-496-1
08	June 13, 2003	978-4-06-341339-7	May 4, 2004	978-1-59182-497-8
09	October 10, 2003	978-4-06-341355-7	July 6, 2004	978-1-59182-498-5
10	February 13, 2004	978-4-06-341373-1	November 9, 2004	978-1-59182-499-2

=== Peach Girl: Sae's Story ===
No.	Original release date	Original ISBN	North American release date	North American ISBN
01	January 13, 2005	978-4-06-341414-1	August 8, 2006	978-1-59816-517-3
02	May 13, 2005	978-4-06-341426-4	December 12, 2006	978-1-59816-518-0
03	May 12, 2006	978-4-06-341472-1	May 10, 2007	978-1-4278-0012-1
