= My Love Story!! =

Japanese manga series and its adaptations

- Cover of the first tankōbon volume, featuring Makoto Sunakawa (left), Takeo Gōda (center), and Rinko Yamato (right).

俺物語!! (Ore Monogatari!!)
- Genre: Romantic comedy
- Manga
- Written by: Kazune Kawahara
- Illustrated by: Aruko
- Published by: Shueisha
- English publisher: NA: Viz Media
- Imprint: Margaret Comics
- Magazine: Bessatsu Margaret Sister; Bessatsu Margaret
- Original run: October 13, 2011 – July 13, 2016
- Volumes: 14
- Anime television series
- Directed by: Morio Asaka
- Produced by: Kōjirō Naotsuka; Atsushi Kirimoto; Toshio Nakatani; Hiroyuki Inage; Shinichi Ikeda; Susumu Hieda; Shinya Shinozaki
- Written by: Natsuko Takahashi
- Music by: S.E.N.S.
- Studio: Madhouse
- Licensed by: AUS: Madman Entertainment; NA: Sentai Filmworks; UK: Animatsu Entertainment
- Original network: Nippon TV
- English network: NA: Anime Network; SEA: Animax Asia
- Original run: April 8, 2015 – September 23, 2015
- Episodes: 24
- Live-action film
- My Love Story!! (2015)
- icon

My Love Story!! (Japanese: 俺物語!!, Hepburn: Ore Monogatari!!; lit. "My Story!!"), is a Japanese romantic comedy manga series written by Kazune Kawahara and illustrated by Aruko. The manga was serialized in Shueisha's Bessatsu Margaret magazine from October 2011 to July 2016. Viz Media published the series in English. The story follows dense but kind-hearted giant Takeo Gōda, who begins dating Yamato Rinko after he defends her from a groper on the train.

An anime television adaptation by Madhouse aired from April to September 2015 and a live-action film adaptation of the same name was released in October 2015.

As of November 2015, the manga had over 4.5 million copies in circulation. In 2013, My Love Story!! won the 37th Kodansha Manga Award in the shōjo category, and the 61st Shogakukan Manga Award in the same category in 2016.

== Plot ==
The story follows Takeo Gōda, a tall and muscular high school student who does not have much luck with women, as every girl he likes ends up falling for his best friend, Makoto Sunakawa, who is charming and good-looking. This all changes when he saves Rinko Yamato, a petite, shy girl who, against all other expectations, falls in love with Takeo, beginning a unique love story.

== Characters ==
Takeo Gōda (剛田 猛男, Gōda Takeo)
Voiced by: Takuya Eguchi, Ren Katou (young) (Japanese); Andrew Love, Luci Christian (young) (English)
Actor portrayal: Ryohei Suzuki
The protagonist of the story and a first-year student at Shuei High School. He is very tall and muscular, easily dwarfing everyone around him. Women tend to find his appearance off-putting or frightening, likening him to a bear or gorilla, but Takeo nevertheless has many friends due to his popularity among men, who are inspired by his strength, physique, and vitality. Despite his hulking appearance and strength, Takeo has an affable personality and is actually extremely kind and selfless, quickly helping others without a second thought throughout the story, and never holding a grudge for things people say about him. Near the beginning of the story, he saves Rinko from a groper and quickly develops feelings for her, but mistakenly thinks that she likes Makoto. It was soon revealed by Makoto that all the girls Takeo had crushes on spoke ill of him, resulting Makoto in rejecting them. Takeo had no knowledge of this until he was told. Rinko, later on, confesses her love to Takeo, which he gladly accepts. Takeo is also a considerate and caring person to his family and friends. When he found out that Rinko has to move to Spain due to her father's job, Takeo let her go anyway although he did not want to be apart from her. When Takeo found out that Rinko has troubles during her exams in Spain, he quickly rushes to her place to comfort her and promises her to always stay by her side no matter what happens instead of blaming himself for the problem. However, he boldly proposes to Rinko in front of a large crowd, much to Rinko's surprise, but she happily accepts in excitement. In the end, Takeo is shown leaving his high school with Rinko and Makoto after bidding farewell to his friends at the high school graduation ceremony, beginning their new college life together.
Rinko Yamato (大和 凛子, Yamato Rinko)
Voiced by: Megumi Han (Japanese); Tia Ballard (English)
Actor portrayal: Mei Nagano
A high school girl whom Takeo saves from a groper on a train. After Takeo saves her, she immediately fell in love with him. Rinko is also a smart person when she secretly follows Takeo after the incident and also asking the neighborhood to find out where he lives and study. Rinko also purposely leaves her cellphone at his house one time when she comes to visit and thank him in order to see Takeo again. When she thought that Takeo mistaking Suna likes her, Rinko rushes to find Takeo and confess her love to him which he gladly accepts. Unlike most girls, who find Takeo frightening, Rinko admires his strength, confidence, and kindness, and she does not seem to pay any mind to his unusual size or appearance. She attends Koizumi Girls' Academy and is very skilled in baking and making sweets. Rinko is the first girl who has been called "a nice girl" by Makoto, presumably since she's the first to look past Takeo's appearance. Rinko is shown to have a determined mind by politely declining Kouki's confession and saying that she had already fallen in love with Takeo when she first met him. She was also shown to have a selfish side at times. When Rinko's father has a job transfer to Spain, she was unwilling to go with him and stated that she wants to stay in Japan with Takeo but eventually goes with him due to Takeo's acceptance of her father's decision. However, this causes Rinko to get poor results during the mock exams, making Takeo thinks that he was the reason she unable to perform well in exams thus making a decision to break up with her. Takeo quickly regrets his decision later on and rushes to Spain in order to apologize for the mean things he said to her. Rinko then was surprised that Takeo proposed to her and happily agrees in excitement. In the end, Rinko succeeded the exams and managed to go to the same college with Takeo and Makoto due to Takeo's neverending support for her after ending their own high school graduation ceremony.
Makoto Sunakawa (砂川 誠, Sunakawa Makoto)
Voiced by: Nobunaga Shimazaki, Yuka Terasaki (young) (Japanese); Austin Tindle, Bryson Baugus (young) (English)
Actor portrayal: Kentaro Sakaguchi
Takeo's next door neighbor, childhood friend, and classmate, who he calls "Suna" for short. Compared to Takeo's boisterous personality, Makoto is level-headed, studious, and rational, though he will occasionally burst into stifled laughter upon witnessing Takeo's unique behavior. Because Makoto is so handsome, all of the girls Takeo liked ended up falling in love with Makoto instead. Despite his endless stream of admirers, Makoto remains single, as he rejected every girl that's confessed to him because of their insulting comments they made about Takeo. However, Takeo's girlfriend, Rinko, and his classmate, Saijo, and even Yukika, his kindergarten classmate changed his impression as a nice girl towards Takeo. Although not nearly as outgoing as Takeo, he nevertheless values his friendship, noting that his life would be "boring" if Takeo were not around. Makoto is always watching out for Takeo and is willing to sacrifice his own happiness for his friend. When Takeo is having trouble with his relationship with Rinko, Makoto was there to help him get back on his own and later succeeds to bring Takeo's relationship with Rinko to the next level. After witnessing that Takeo has found his true happiness, Makoto was happy for him as his best friend. In the end, Makoto departs with Takeo and Rinko after his high school graduation ceremony, moving together towards their college life.
Ai Sunakawa (砂川 愛, Sunakawa Ai)
Voiced by: Kikuko Inoue (Japanese); Carli Mosier (English)
Makoto's older sister and a college student, she studies at Ousaki University in Nagoya. Takeo mentions that she, like her brother, is a great and kindhearted person. She has had a secret crush on Takeo ever since he compared her to a flower when they were children. Only her brother and her colleague Oda know about her feelings for Takeo. Knowing that Takeo had found his true love with Rinko, she supports them and wished them happiness.
Yuriko Gōda (剛田 ゆり子, Gōda Yuriko)
Voiced by: Kazuyo Aoki (Japanese); Marcy Bannor (English)
Actor portrayal: Sawa Suzuki
Takeo's mother, who always works hard for her family. Takeo is extremely protective of her, though she insists he worries for no reason as she was once an amateur wrestler and when she was giving birth to Takeo she actually helped carry another woman into the maternity room when she went into labor first. She, later on, gives birth to Maki, who is Takeo's little sister, when he is in high school.
Yutaka Gōda (剛田 豊, Gōda Yutaka)
Voiced by: Tesshô Genda (Japanese); Josh Morrison (English)
Actor portrayal: Yasufumi Terawaki
Husband of Yuriko, father of Takeo and Maki Gōda, who has a rather handsome appearance. He fell in love with Takeo's mother when he saw her put herself in harm's way to protect someone else and decided he wanted to be the one to protect her.
Hayato Oda (織田 隼人, Oda Hayato)
Voiced by: Daisuke Namikawa (Japanese); Patrick Poole (English)
An acquaintance at Ai's university who has a crush on her, but keeps getting turned down because of her feelings for Takeo. Even though he gets turned down, Oda never gives up and hopes Ai will accept his love one day.
Osamu Kurihara (栗原 オサム, Kurihara Osamu)
Voiced by: Junya Enoki (Japanese); Cameron Bautsch (English)
A friend and classmate of Takeo. He has an afro hairstyle. He took a liking to one of Rinko's friends, Nanako, and asked her out, and she accepted.
Mariya Saijō (西城 まりや, Saijō Mariya)
Voiced by: Rena Maeda (Japanese); Stephanie Wittels (English)
A classmate of Takeo. She begins to call Takeo "shishō" (師匠, teacher) after he trains her for a sports day relay race at their school. She had a crush on Takeo after witnessing Takeo not giving up to win the relay race. She then confessed to Takeo although she knows he has a girlfriend but was politely declined by him and she moved on. She even gave obligatory/friendship chocolate to Makoto and Takeo on Valentine's Day and is the second girl who has been called "a nice girl" by Makoto.
Nanako Yamazaki (山崎 菜々子, Nanako)
Voiced by: Rina Kitagawa (Japanese); Luci Christian (English)
A friend and classmate of Rinko. She was confessed to by Takeo's friend, Osamu Kurihara, and started dating him after Christmas.
Ayu (アユ, Ayu)
Voiced by: Marie Hatanaka (Japanese); Shanae'a Moore (English)
A friend and classmate of Rinko.
Yukika Amami (天海悠紀華, Amami Yukika)
Voiced by: Ai Kayano (Japanese); Juliet Simmons (English)
A girl from Takeo's and Makoto's childhood. She has had a crush on Makoto since he blocked a ball from hitting her during dodgeball in their childhood. She has given anonymous valentine letters to Suna every year since and when she confessed to him she was politely rejected by him, but Makoto has shown his gratitude by giving a gift to her for the years she supported him from behind. Unlike the other girls rejected by Makoto, he felt guilty when seeing Yukika cry. Makoto later acknowledges her as a nice girl and they become friends, yet she still stalks Makoto to prevent any girls from approaching him.
Kouki Ichinose (一の瀬後期, Ichinose Kōki)
Voiced by: Jun Fukuyama (Japanese); David Matranga (English)
A confectioner that works in the shop where Rinko works for a part-time job. He falls in love upon seeing Rinko and considers her his muse. When he discovers that Takeo is Rinko's boyfriend, he asks him to break up with her because he says that he is a better fit for her, causing an inner dilemma in Takeo's mind over whether he is really the one who can make Rinko happy. Although being politely rejected by Rinko, he still wishes for her happiness with Takeo.

== Media ==
=== Manga ===
The series debuted as a 100-page special in Bessatsu Margaret Sister on October 13, 2011, before becoming serialized in Bessatsu Margaret, ending with a 100-page final chapter on July 13, 2016. The first volume was released by Shueisha on March 23, 2012, while the thirteenth and final volume was released on September 23, 2016. Viz Media has licensed the series and released the first volume on July 1, 2014.

In honor of the 50th anniversary of Margaret, Kawahara and Aruko collaborated with Io Sakisaka, the creator of Ao Haru Ride, to create a crossover comic called My Ride!!, which was released in the July 2013 issue of Bessatsu Margaret.

A 60-page side story chapter was released in September 2018 and two further chapters in December 2023 and January 2024. All were published in Bessatsu Margaret. They were collected in an additional volume released on April 24, 2024.

==== Volume list ====
No.	Original release date	Original ISBN	English release date	English ISBN
1	March 23, 2012	978-4-08-846756-6	July 1, 2014	978-1-42-157144-7
2	August 24, 2012	978-4-08-846817-4	October 7, 2014	978-1-42-157145-4
3	February 25, 2013	978-4-08-846896-9	January 6, 2015	978-1-42-157146-1
4	August 23, 2013	978-4-08-845086-5	April 7, 2015	978-1-42-157147-8
5	February 25, 2014	978-4-08-845169-5	July 7, 2015	978-1-42-157148-5
6	June 13, 2014	978-4-08-845229-6	October 6, 2015	978-1-42-157914-6
7	November 13, 2014	978-4-08-845295-1	January 5, 2016	978-1-42-158213-9
8	March 25, 2015	978-4-08-845362-0	April 5, 2016	978-1-42-158449-2
9	June 25, 2015	978-4-08-845401-6	July 5, 2016	978-1-42-158629-8
10	October 13, 2015	978-4-08-845465-8	October 4, 2016	978-1-42-158868-1
11	February 25, 2016	978-4-08-845526-6	February 7, 2017	978-1-42-159122-3
12	May 25, 2016	978-4-08-845578-5	May 2, 2017	978-1-42-159214-5
13	September 23, 2016	978-4-08-845638-6	September 5, 2017	978-1-42-159053-0
14	April 24, 2024	978-4-08-844898-5	March 4, 2025	978-1-97-475277-5

=== Anime ===
In November 2014 it was announced that the series was being adapted into an anime series. Covering roughly 34 chapters of the manga, the anime was produced by Madhouse, Nippon TV, VAP, Shueisha and Nippon Television Music Corporation and directed by Morio Asaka, with Natsuko Takahashi handling series composition, Kunihiko Hamada designing the characters and S.E.N.S. composing the music. The anime began airing on Nippon TV from April 8, 2015, and is being simulcast by Crunchyroll. The opening theme is "Miraikei Answer" (未来形 Answer; lit. Futuristic Answer) by Trustrick while the ending theme is "Shiawase no Arika" (幸せのありか; lit. "Happiness's Hiding Place") by Local Connect. The soundtrack is composed by S.E.N.S. Project. The final episode of the series, originally scheduled for September 16, 2015, was delayed to September 23.

=== Live-action film ===
A live-action film adaptation of the same name was released on October 31, 2015. It starred Ryohei Suzuki, Mei Nagano and Kentaro Sakaguchi. Southeast Asian anime distributor ODEX began to release the film in Singapore, Malaysia, Indonesia, and the Philippines between January and February 2016.

== Reception ==
As of November 2015, the manga had over 4.5 million copies in circulation. The fifth volume of the series was the 53rd best-selling manga volume of the first half of 2014 in Japan.

My Love Story!! won the 37th Kodansha Manga Award in the shōjo category in 2013. The manga won the 61st Shogakukan Manga Award in the shōjo category in 2016. It was nominated for the 6th Manga Taishō in 2013 and received a total of 58 points, coming in at 5th place. It was also nominated for the 18th Annual Tezuka Osamu Cultural Prize "Reader Award". In Takarajimasha's 2013 edition of the guidebook Kono Manga ga Sugoi!, a survey with more than 400 manga professionals, My Love Story!! was selected as the best series for female readers; in the 2014 edition, it was the 15th best.

My Love Story!! was number one on the Book of the Year list of Female-Oriented Comics from January to June, 2013 by Da Vinci magazine, and number five in the annual list of 2012.
