= Papillon (manga) =

Japanese manga series

- The cover of the first volume published in Japan by Kodansha

パピヨン―花と蝶― (Papiyon -Hana to Chō-)
- Manga
- Written by: Miwa Ueda
- Published by: Kodansha
- English publisher: NA: Del Rey Manga
- Magazine: Bessatsu Friend
- Original run: 2007 – December 2009
- Volumes: 8

Papillon (Japanese: パピヨン―花と蝶―, Hepburn: Papiyon -Hana to Chō-) is a Japanese shōjo manga by Miwa Ueda, who is known for her work, Peach Girl. The chapters appeared as a serial in the Japanese manga anthology Bessatsu Friend and were published by Kodansha in eight tankōbon from January 2007 to December 2009. The plot focuses on an unattractive, ordinary girl's change into a beautiful and popular one.

Papillon was licensed for an English-language release in North America by Del Rey, but they only managed to release the first six volumes before going out of business.

== Story ==
Ageha and her sister Hana are twins. At birth, their parents left Ageha in the care of their grandmother in the countryside. Hana was raised in the big city with her parents. However, when the girls were in second grade, their grandmother became ill and so, Ageha was sent to live with her parents and her twin sister in the city.

Now, the two girls are in high school and are complete opposites. Growing up in the countryside has made Ageha a bit of a tomboy; she's a quiet, reserved girl who doesn't look anything special. Hana, on the other hand, is outgoing, gorgeous and popular at school. From Hana, Ageha develops an inferiority complex.

One day when all of Ageha's classmates leave to attend a concert, Ageha finds herself alone to maintain the booth at school during the school fair. Ageha feels as if she's Cinderella who didn't get invited to go to the ball. Just when she was thinking those thoughts, a boy wearing a horse mask on his head runs into the classroom and hides underneath a table. His name is Kyuu. It turns out he's being chased by some girls. After the girls leave, Ageha is startled by Kyuu who demands that she serve him coffee. As she does so, Kyuu flips through her agenda booklet and discovers a photograph of Ageha and the boy she has a crush on, Ryuusei, who she has known from childhood but since they moved away, they have forgotten each other. Kyuu asks if she likes Ryuusei, and if she wants to be Ryuusei's girlfriend in a teasing sort of way, causing much embarrassment to the girl. Kyuu then tells her that if she believes in her heart that it is possible, it could come true. Kyuu tells her to shout out that she's Ryuusei's girlfriend and that they are going out and her life is very good, which Ageha does so. As soon as she speaks the words, Ryuusei appears at the classroom door and recognizes Ageha as the girl from his childhood that he used to play with. Ageha secretly thinks of Kyuu as Cinderella's fairy godmother and cannot believe that it happened.

However, as Ageha and Ryuusei rekindle a friendship from long ago, Hana becomes suspicious or jealous of Ageha's relationship with Ryuusei. She becomes especially annoyed when she finds out that Ryuusei prefers Ageha to her. Hana then begins to formulate a plan to steal Ryuusei away from Ageha.

After some time Ageha winds up walking with Ryuusei and Hana to visit her grandma at the hospital. Hana ends up flirting with Ryuusei leaving Ageha out of everything.

Ageha begins to feel nervous about how the two are leaving her out of everything and begins to complain that she has a stomach ache. After taking a beak, They begin to go in a taxi home, when Hana tells Ryuusei that they should still go to the hospital to visit Hana's and Ageha's grandmother. After consulting the fact that Ageha will be going home alone, Hana convinces Ryuusei to go to the hospital with her still. Ageha is shocked by how Hana is treating her, and after Hana gets home, decides to confront her. However, when Hana comes home and Ageha tells her suspicions and Hana scoffs it off, saying that she just thought he was fun and nice to be with. And as if as a side note, Hana adds that she is dating Ryuusei, and Ageha is crushed!

Later on, Ageha develops a crush on Kyuu-chan and finally confesses to him about this on a ferris wheel where they were supposed to act out how Ageha was supposed to ask Ryuusei out. Volume 2 ends when Kyuu-chan says that he is her teacher but it could work.

Kyuu ends up going out with Ageha, and Ageha was ecstatic. But after the first day of the two going out, Kyuu mistakes Hana for Ageha and Hana gets the idea to ruin Ageha's chance with Kyuu. Kyuu takes Hana on a date, still thinking it was Ageha and Hana completely offends Kyuu and carelessly acts rude on the date.

== Characters ==
Ageha Mizuki (水城 亜蝶, Mizuki Ageha)
She is the shy protagonist. She's usually quite reserved and is considered unattractive when compared to her twin sister because of her bangs, glasses, and acne. She shows small signs of jealousy towards her sister's popularity at school but is a kind-hearted person overall. She was a very outgoing girl, but coming back to the city and seeing her sister made her lose confidence. At the beginning, she believed compared to her sister her own existence was meaningless, even at her own home as her mother never seemed to love her as much as she did Hana. After deciding to kill herself once her only friend shows off her diary to the class, Kyuu calls her down and gives her the words of encouragement she needed. She later develops more friends, who help her give her a more girlish appearance to where its hard to tell her and Hana apart and encourage her to go after Ryuusei. It is later revealed that (through Kyuu's help) that her mother sent her to her grandmothers as Ageha would always cry when she held her, making her feel as if Ageha was rejecting her as a mother. She later starts to developed feelings for Kyuu, however after he mistook Hana for her on the day she was sick, Hana sabotages it. Though after getting advice from another teacher (who she originally assumed to be Kyuu because of the horse head mask he was wearing), she thanks Kyuu for all he has done for her, and for accepting her feelings, even if for only a little while. Kyuu realizes that it was Hana pretending to be Ageha and they get back together. There are many more complications later on in this series involving Ageha, Hana, Kyuu, and Ryuusei.
Hana Mizuki (水城 花奈, Mizuki Hana)
Ageha's twin sister and a popular, beautiful girl at school. She is the type who goes through many boyfriends. She has a determined attitude and believes if you work for a goal, you will be able to obtain it. However, she doesn't often use this trait for good. Hana often manipulates other people to get what she wants and becomes easily jealous of others, especially her sister. Where every time Ageha shows attraction, she quickly takes him away or makes them believe Ageha (her in disguise) is extremely selfish, even openly admitting to Kyuu that she wishes to prevent her sister from ever attaining happiness. Kyuu compares her to a rose, stating she is "covered in thorns". However, as of recent chapters, it is revealed that after a guy she liked confessed to Ageha, she seems to believe that Ageha "stole" her boyfriend and now has the boys she dates go through a secret "lust" test by dressing up as Ageha and see if said guy will betray her. She later shows that she in fact has an inferiority complex towards her sister, as despite her appearance that attracts boys they ultimately want a girl with a personality like Ageha.
Ryuusei Koike (小池 流星, Koike Ryūsei)
Ageha's childhood friend from when she lived in the countryside. He's considered good looking and is a nice, outgoing person. He is a bit clueless when it comes to the rivalry between Ageha and Hana, as he sees Ageha as a good friend. She had a crush on him since they were kids, but because of her appearance, she never felt she was worthy to go out with him. However, after her appearance change, her sister Hana quickly steals him away before Ageha could confess her feelings to him. He was dating Hana, but they broke up because of Hana selfishly requesting his time at the drop of a hat and especially after she disguise herself as Ageha to see if he would be faithful to Hana. He later reveals to a disguised Hana that his first love was Ageha, and he would have dated her if she had asked him out.
Hayato Ichijiku (Kyuu-chan) (九 颯人, Ichijiku Hayato)
The young new guidance counselor at school who is still studying in college. He has quite a perverted personality and is very outgoing and silly. He encourages Ageha to be happier by going towards her goals rather than shy away from them. Many of the older girls flaunt over him. After he helped Ageha, she confessed that she fell in love with him, which he says they could make it work. However, after believing Hana was Ageha on the day that she was sick, she uses that to her advantage to make him buy her an expensive meal (one she hardly touches), makes him waste his time, and tells him off when he has to go. The next day he dresses in black and tells Ageha that he doubts they could make it work. However, after she gave him that heartfelt speech of hers as well as another teacher pointing out how much Hana and Ageha look the same, he is able to figure out it was actually Hana he went on a date with. He gets his revenge by making her do embarrassing stuff while pretending to believe she is her sister. Afterwards, he finds Ageha and tells her he still cares about her.
Ran Ichijiku
Kyuu's sister-in-law. At first, Ageha thinks she and Kyuu are dating, which makes her jealous as Ran has a great figure and is described as beautiful. However, she is really good friends to Kyuu and makes him look after her baby twins when she's shopping. Her children's names are Rui and Mari.
Rui and Mari
The twin baby girls of Ran Ichijiku. They are very fussy babies and Ran often has a hard time with them, but Ageha (with advice from her mother) always cheers them up with a game of peek-a-boo. They can also tell the difference between Ageha and Hana.
Shindou Shinobu (新堂 忍, Shindō Shinobu)
A very kind understanding person. Who dated Hana in middle school and was tricked by her. She masqueraded as Ageha and seduced him to see if he loved her. He was not seduced but did confess to Ageha that he liked her. Now working in his family's business he and Ageha meet again as she gets a summer job.

== Release ==
Written and illustrated by Miwa Ueda, the chapters of Papillon - Hana to Chō were serialized in the Japanese manga anthology Bessatsu Friend from 2007 to December 2009. Kodansha published the chapters in eight tankōbon from January 12, 2007, to December 11, 2009.

Del Rey Manga licensed the series for an English-language release in North America. Six volumes have been published.

=== Volume list ===
No.	Title	Original release date	North American release date
01	Butterfly	January 12, 2007; 978-4-06-341507-0	October 14, 2008; 978-0-345-50519-4
02	A New Life, A New Love	June 13, 2007; 978-4-06-341528-5	January 27, 2009; 978-0-345-50592-7
03	Enemy Sister?	December 13, 2007; 978-4-06-341554-4	May 19, 2009; 978-0-345-50807-2
04	Sister Act	April 11, 2008; 978-4-06-341572-8	October 27, 2009; 978-0-345-51234-5
05	Double Trouble	September 12, 2008; 978-4-06-341589-6	2010 (Del-Rey released Volume 5 and 6 as a double release in one book); 978-0-345-51717-3
06	Double Trouble	February 13, 2009; 978-4-06-341607-7	2010; 978-0-345-51717-3
07	—	July 13, 2009; 978-4-06-341628-2	—
08	—	December 11, 2009; 978-4-06-341656-5	—
