= Rena Nōnen =

Japanese actress and singer (born 1993)

Non
- のん
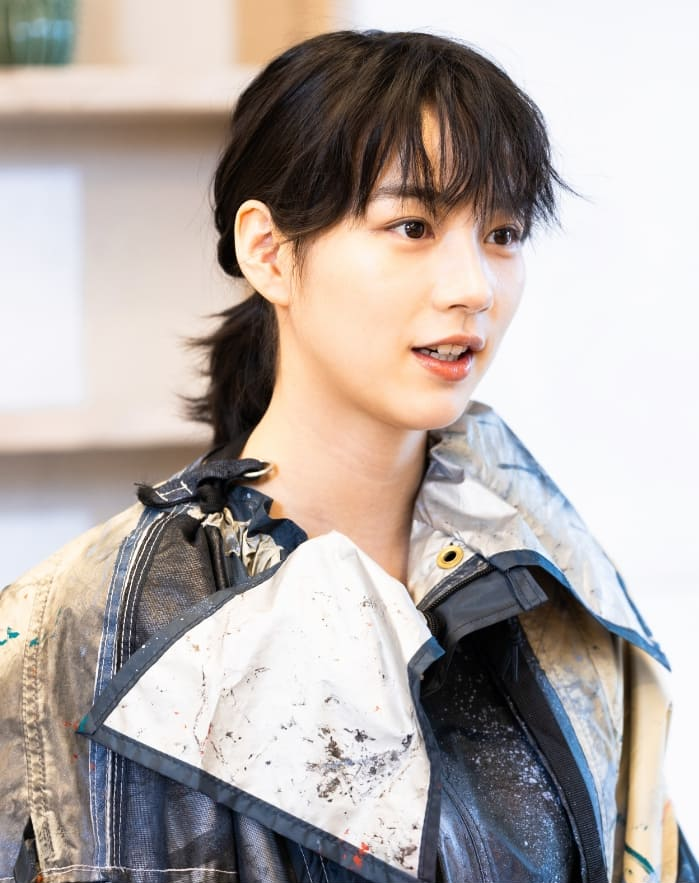
- Non in May 2024
- Born: Rena Nōnen; July 13, 1993 (age 33); Kamikawa, Hyogo Prefecture, Japan
- Occupations: Actress; model; singer
- Years active: 2006–present
- Agent: non inc.
- Known for: Amachan
- Style: Rock; Garage Rock; Pop Rock; Pop Punk
- Height: 165 cm (5 ft 5 in)
- Awards: 38th Japan Academy Newcomer Award
- Website: nondesu.jp

Rena Nōnen (sometimes spelled as Rena Nounen) (能年 玲奈, Nōnen Rena; born July 13, 1993), known professionally as Non (のん, Non), is a Japanese actress, fashion model and singer from Kamikawa, Hyōgo Prefecture. She is best known for her lead roles on the NHK drama series Amachan (2013). In July 2016, it was announced that she changed her stage name to Non (のん, Non). She started releasing her own music in 2017 under her own label with her debut single, Ohirome Pack, and released her debut album, Super Heroes, in 2018.

== Career ==
Nōnen debuted as a fashion model in 2006 and was selected as the eleventh image character for Calpis in 2012. In 2012, she was chosen in an audition of 1,953 women to play the heroine in the 2013 NHK Asadora Amachan, in which she plays a high school girl who decides to become an ama, or female shell diver, as well as an idol. Amachan was a ratings success, earning an average 20.6% rating over the span of the series, second amongst Asadora only to Umechan Sensei (at 20.7%) in the last decade. Nōnen served as the "PR Ambassador" for the 2013 Kohaku Uta Gassen and was a featured performer on the show, singing and leading the band. In August 2017, she started her own record label called KAIWA(RE)CORD and began releasing music as a solo artist, debuting with single Ohirome Pack in 2017 and her first album called Superhero's in 2018.

== Filmography ==
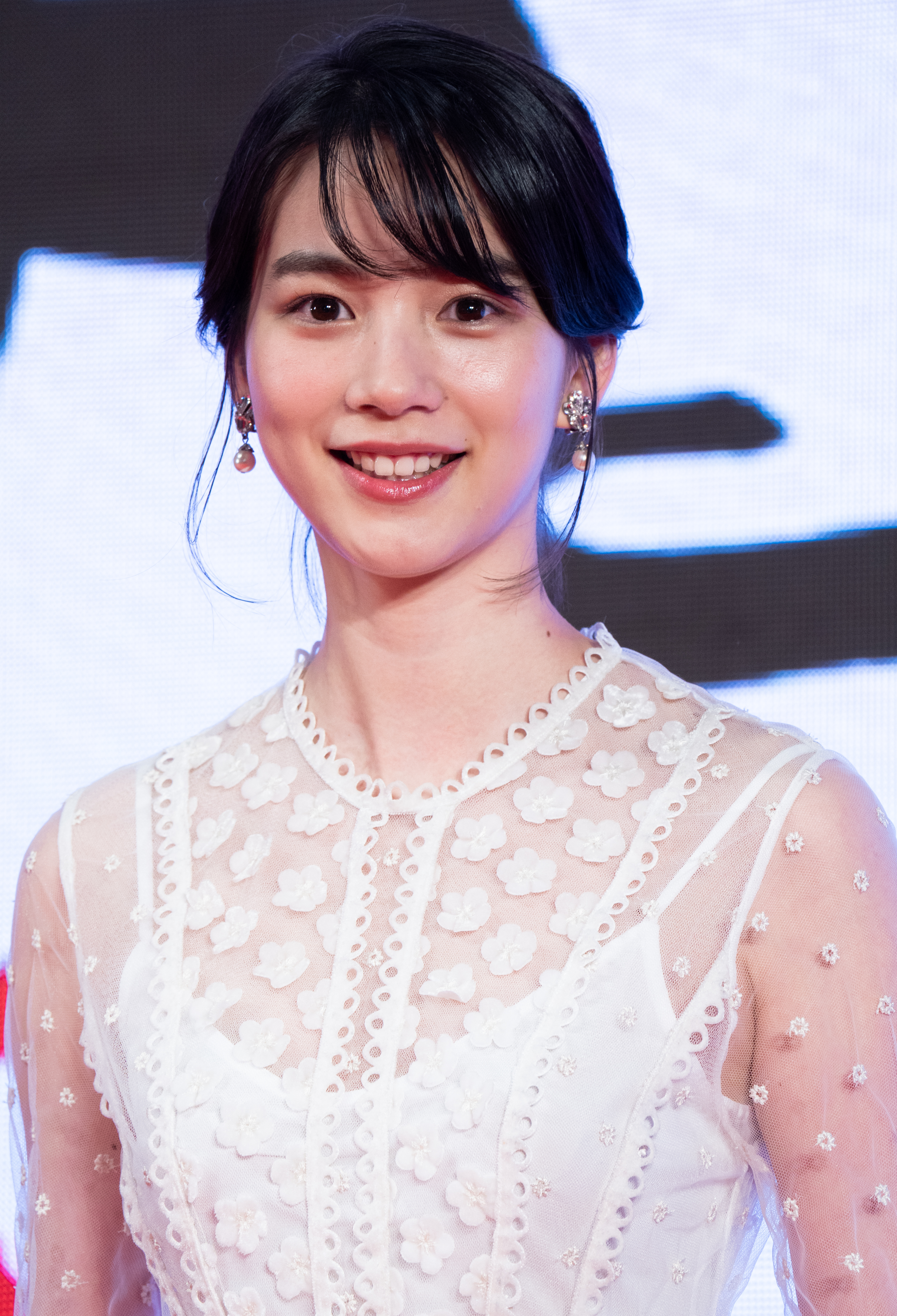
Non at the Tokyo International Film Festival in 2019

=== Film ===
Year	Title	Role	Notes	Ref(s)
2010	Confessions	Shūka Kiritani		
2011	Avatar	Rin Ōkubo		
2012	By Rule of Crow's Thumb	Mahiro Kawai		
2012	G'mor evian!	Tomo-chan		
2012	Himawari: Okinawa wa Wasurenai Anohi no Sorao	Kana Shiroma		
2014	Hot Road	Kazuki Miyaichi	Lead	
2014	Princess Jellyfish	Tsukimi Kurashita	Lead	
2016	In This Corner of the World	Suzu Hōjō	Lead, voice role	
2019	In This Corner (and Other Corners) of the World	Suzu Hōjō	Lead, voice role	
2020	Stardust Over the Town	Ai Kumabe		
2020	Hold Me Back	Mitsuko Kuroda	Lead	
2022	Ribbon	Itsuka	Lead, also director and writer	
2022	The Fish Tale	Mee-Bō	Lead	
2022	The Three Sisters of Tenmasou Inn	Tamae	Lead	
2024	The Hotel of My Dream	Kayoko (Juri Arimori)	Lead	
2025	As for Me	Juri Arimori		
2025	Bullet Train Explosion	Chika Matsumoto		
2025	Climbing for Life	Junko Tabe (young)		
2025	After the Quake	Kaeru-kun	Voice role	
2026	Lives at Right Angles	Nozomi	Lead	

=== TV dramas ===
Year	Title	Role	Notes	Ref(s)
2010	Shin Keishichō Sousa Ikka 9 Gakari Season 2	Mirai Ichinose	Episode 7	
2011	You Taught Me All the Precious Things	Rena Tokunaga		
2011	High School Restaurant	Maho Miyazawa		
2011	Brilliant Thieves Royale	Kaede Hatomura		
2012	The Locked Room Murders	Rina Mizuki		
2012	Summer Rescue	Mako Suzuki		
2013	Amachan	Aki Amano	Lead, Asadora	
2014	Tales of the Unusual: Spring 2014	Kaoru Asahina	Lead, episode 3 "Kūsō Shōjo"	
2025	Happy Kanako's Killer Life	Kanako	Lead	
2025	News Anchor	Kaede Shinomiya	Episode 3	
2025	After the Quake	Kaeru-kun	Voice role; miniseries	
2026	Tokyo Mid 30s	Haruka Yamaji		

=== Anime television ===
- Onihei (2017) as "Otaka"
- Pokémon Concierge (2023) as "Haru"

=== Dubbing ===
- The Lorax (2012) as "Audrey"
- Marona's Fantastic Tale (2020) as "Marona"

=== Commercials ===
- NTT DoCoMo - START! DoCoMo Campaign (2007-2008)
- The Oriental Land Company - Tokyo Disney Resort Campus Day Passport (2011)
- Calpis - Calpis Water (2012-2015)
- A-net - Ne-net (2012)
- Asahi Food & Healthcare - Natureve Kajitsu Dolce (2013)
- Kosé
  - Company (2013)
  - Kosé Cosmeport - Softymo Natusabon (2014)
- Canon - Mirrorless Camera Canon EOS M2 (2014)
- Japan Post Insurance - Company (2014)
- JX Holdings - ENEOS (2014)
- Square Enix - Dragon Quest Monsters Superlight (2014)
- Parco - Parco Gran-bazaar (2014)
- Line Mobile (2017)

=== Music videos ===
- Sonohitomi, Imishiin (2012) - CureaL
- Micro Boy and Macro Girl (2017) - Scha Dara Parr and EGO-WRAPPIN'
- WHAT A BEAUTIFUL NIGHT (2018) - Yasuyuki Horigome
- Music is a Gift (Ongaku wa Okurimono) (2021) - Akiko Yano
- Boku dake no mono (2022) - Sambomaster; also as writer and director
- Song of the Dead (2023) - KANA-BOON

== Bibliography ==
=== Magazines ===
- Nicola, Shinchosha, 1997-, as an exclusive model (2006–2010)
- Beautiful Lady & Television, Nounen Rena no Pop de Art na Uhihi. Style Guri-Guri-Gurumi, Tokyo News Service.

=== Photobooks ===
- NHK Renzoku TV Shōsetsu Amachan Nounen Rena featuring Amano Aki (NHK Shuppan); ISBN 9784140816110
- Nounen Rena 1st Photobook Guri-Guri-Gurumi (Tokyo News Service)

== Discography ==
=== Albums ===
- Super Heroes (2018)
- Pursue (2023)

=== Singles and EPs ===
- Ohirome Pack (2017)
- スーパーヒーローになりたい (Superhero ni Naritai/I Want to Be a Superhero) (2017)
- Run!!! (2018)
- わたしはベイベー (Watashi wa Baby/I am baby) (2018)
- やまないギャル (Yamanai Girl) (2019)
- Baby Face (2019)
- この町は (Kono Machi Ha) (2019)
- わたしは部屋中 (Watashi wa Heyaju) (2019)
- クリスマスソング (Christmas Song) (2019)
- なまいきにスカート (Namaiki ni Skirt) (2020)
- GwGw (2025) (Collaboration with Kana-Boon and Pokémon)

== Awards ==
2006
- 10th Nicola model audition - Grand Prix
2012
- 37th Hochi Film Awards - Best New Artist for Karasu no Oyayubi
2013
- 6th Tokyo Drama Awards - Best Actress for Amachan
- 26th Shogakukan Dime Trend Award - The man in the news
- 78th Television Drama Academy Awards - Best Actress for Amachan
2014
- 38th Elan d'or Awards - Rookie of the Year
- 22nd Hashida Awards - Rookie Award for Amachan
- 17th Nikkan Sports Drama Grand Prix - Best Actress for Amachan
- 6th Tama Film Awards - Best Rising Actress for Hot Road
- 27th Nikkan Sports Film Award - Rookie of the Year
2015
- 38th Japan Academy Film Prize - Rookie of the Year (Hot Road)
- 31st Asakusa Entertainment Award - Best Newcomer
2016
- 38th Yokohama Film Festival - Special Jury Prize for In This Corner of the World
2017
- 31st Takasaki Film Festival - Horizont Award for In This Corner of the World
- 21st Japan Internet Movie Awards - Best Actress for In This Corner of the World
- 11th Seiyu Awards - Special Award

2024

- 16th Juzo Itami Awards
