= Rina Ōta =

Japanese fashion model and actress (born 1988)

- 太田 莉菜
- Born: 11 January 1988 (age 38); Chiba Prefecture, Japan
- Occupations: Model; actress
- Years active: 2001–present
- Style: General fashion
- Height: 170 cm (5 ft 7 in)
- Spouse: Ryuhei Matsuda (m. 2009; div. 2017)
- Children: 1
- Awards: Nicola 4th Audition Grand Prix

Rina Ōta (太田 莉菜, Ōta Rina; born 11 January 1988, in Chiba Prefecture), is a Japanese fashion model and actress. She is represented with Anoré.

== Career ==
In 2001, Ōta won the Grand Prix along with Yui Aragaki at the 4th Reader Model Audition of the magazine Nicola. After that while modelling with Nicola, she appeared in other magazines and media. For her publications other than her model participation, Ōta collaborated with the fashion brand Pou Dou Dou, and served as the editor-in-chief of hotikiss, as well as the photograph collection hotikiss (both previsions).

She has appeared in many television advertisements for products such as Shiseido, Sony and Aohata (Kewpie). In one case, Ōta appeared in an advert for Ezaki Glico's Water Ring Kiss Mint gum, instead of Mariko Takahashi appearing.

She played the heroine in the film 69 released in 2004 and started her acting career. In the same year, Ōta was in charge of the April–September quarter of NHK's language programme Russia-go Kaiwa. She won the "Best Teen Fashionista Award" at the MTV Student Voice Awards 2006. Ōta later moved her agency from Okazaki Models to Anoré in March 2010.

== Personal life ==
Rina Ōta was born on January 11, 1988, in Chiba Prefecture, to a Japanese father and a Russian mother.

Ōta married actor Ryuhei Matsuda on 11 January 2009, the two met through a mutual friend in the fall of 2007 and soon began dating. The pair share one child together, a daughter, born on 4 July 2009. They divorced in December 2017.

== Filmography ==
=== TV dramas ===
Year	Title	Role	Network	Ref.
2007	Girlfriends	Noel Fujisaki	Fuji TV 721	
2008	2 Cool		NTV	
2013	Neo Ultra Q	Meri	WOWOW	
2014	Watashi to iu Unmei ni tsuite	Saori Fuyuki	WOWOW	
2014	The Long Goodbye	Shihatsu Harada	NHK	
2016	Love Love Alien	Sotsuki Shinohara	Fuji TV	
2016	Yonimo Kimyōna Monogatari '16 Aki no Tokubetsu-hen: Shachū no Dekigoto	Uriko	Fuji TV	

=== Films ===
Year	Title	Role	Ref.
2004	69		
2006	Yumorescue: Sakasama no Chō		
2008	Ginmaku-ban Sushi-ōji: New York e Iku	Nae	
2013	Nō Otoko	Yuria Mizusawa	
2013	Casablanca no Tantei		
2014	The Next Generation -Patlabor-	Ekaterina Kratievna Kanukaeva (Kasha)	
2014	Hot Road	Hiroko	
2014	Princess Jellyfish	Mayaya	
2015	The Next Generation -Patlabor- Shuto Kessen	Ekaterina Kratievna Kanukaeva (Kasha)	
2016	Terra Formars	Mariari Seijo	
2017	Kimi to 100-kai-me no Koi	Haruhiro Oohara	
2021	Daughter of Lupin the Movie	Natasha	

=== Internet drama ===
Year	Title	Role	Website
2016	Terra Formars / Aratanaru Kibō	Maria Magi	dTV

=== Magazine covers ===
Title
Nicola
non-no
mini
Zipper
Pretty Style
Seda
Jille
Fudge
Nylon Japan
Biteki
Marie Claire

=== Photo albums ===
Year	Title	Book code
2005	hotikiss 2	ISBN 978-4107901910
2008	Gekkan Rina Ohta	ISBN 978-4107901910

=== Advertisements ===
Year	Title	Ref.
2003	Shiseido "Hanatsubaki"	
2005	Shiseido "Aude Recipe"	
2005	Kewpie Aohata Jam	
2006	miumiu world wide campaign	
2011	AEON 2011 Natsu Campaign "Mizugi Majic"	
2013	KDDI "au Play Screen / Odoroki o, Jōshiki ni."	
2013	Sanei-International Natural Beauty Basic 2013-Nen Akifuyu Campaign	

=== Participating works ===
Year	Title	Ref.
2007	Eiga Ex Machina Soundtrack	
2012	Eiga Seiji: Riku no Sakana image song "Sacrifice"	
