= Taku Tsumugi =

Japanese manga artist

- Born: August 2, 1964; Yokohama, Japan
- Occupation: Manga artist

Taku Tsumugi (紡木たく, Tsumugi Taku; born August 2, 1964) is a Japanese manga artist. She published manga mostly in the 1980s and 1990s in the magazine Bessatsu Margaret. She was commercially successful; her series Hot Road (1986–1987) was one of the best-selling shōjo manga of the 1980s. Tsumugi developed a specific style within the visual and narrative grammar of shōjo manga to convey the emotional depth of her characters. Her storytelling techniques and play with form got attention by manga scholars and critic.

== Life and career ==
Tsumugi does usually not accept interviews and there is only little known about her personal life. She was born in Yokohama in 1964. Growing up, her mother forbade her from reading manga and both of her parents were drawing in their freetime; her father drew landscapes.

She was 17 years old, when she started her career as a professional manga artist. Her first published work was the short story "Machibito" ("Waiting"), which appeared in 1982 in the manga magazine Bessatsu Margaret. She became a regular contributor to the magazine and wrote short stories. From 1984 until 1985, she drew her first series with Tsukue wo Stage ni.

Her most successful series was Hot Road, which she published in Bessatsu Margaret between 1986 and 1987. The story revolves around a highschool girl with family issues who falls in love with a juvenile delinquent who is part of a motorcycle gang. The four tankobon volumes had 7 million copies in print, which made it one of the best-selling shōjo manga of the 1980s. Her next series Mabataki mo Sezu ("Without Blinking") was her longest; it ran from 1987 until 1990 and depicts the love story between two high school students in a small town. She became friends with fellow Bessatsu Margaret contributors Fusako Kuramochi, Chiaki Hijiri and Kaoru Tada while working for the magazine.

In 1995, she stopped her career. The only manga she published after this was My Gardener in 2007. However, she released a picture book compiled of watercolor panels from previous manga of hers in 2014 and supervised the script of the 2014 live-action film adaptation of Hot Road.

== Style ==
=== Storytelling ===
She uses inner monologue in form of a stream of consciousness narration and her storytelling is considered documentary-like realistic. Tsumugi's storytelling has a focus on conveying emotions like pain, anxiety and the eventual healing from them. Themes like mental health and grief appear in Kanashimi no Machi ("Town of Sorrow), the short story "Yokohama, 14-sai, Yūko" deals with a 14-year-old having an abortion. Manga scholar Rachel Thorn called her stories "sensitive" and "moving". Masanao Amano describes that Tsumugi often draws "the kind of situation when a person is so engrossed with what they are feeling internally, the world around them fails to have any kind of meaning."

While the protagonists in her first short stories were college students, she became most known for centering the lives of high school and junior high school students. In her later career, she had works focusing on elementary school students. Her characters were usually youth with family issues such as problems between parents and children, an absent father the breakdown of a family. Hot Road deals with the impact of "yankee" subcultures of juvenile delinquents in motorcycle gangs in Japan in the 1980s; Marie Kim considers her portrayal of rebellious female delinquents a glorification of "yankee" culture. Other shōjo manga artists like Satosumi Takaguchi also portrayed "yankee" culture at the time. Thorn sees Tsumugi's focus on marginalized youth as an example of the development of shōjo manga in the 1980s, which at this point had lost some of its innocence when depicting relationships and identity.

While some of her manga like Hot Road are set in urban environments, other like Mabataki mo Sezu are set in the countryside. Titles and dialogue often incorporate colloquialisms. For example, the dialogue in Mabataki mo Sezu is consistently written in the local dialect of Yamaguchi Prefecture, where the story is set.

=== Visuals ===
While her aesthetic is, according to Rachel Thorn, within the "visual grammar of shōjo manga", Tsumugi is credited with creating new forms of expression within this aesthetic. Tsumugi uses experimentation with form in order in order to create multi-layered depictions of the psychology of her characters.

Her style is marked by placing empty space and, especially in Mabataki mo Sezu, vast landscapes in the center. There are hardly any close-ups of faces of characters in her work, often characters stand alone in a scenery. Tsumugi expressed in an interview that she enjoys drawing background scenery, as opposed to many other shōjo manga artists. She adds sound words to background scenes taking place in the far distance. Thorn writes, "Delicate images are set against a stark white background. Readers get the feeling of viewing the action from afar, as if remembering some long-forgotten memory". Tsumugi also conveys emotion through the placement of speech bubbles, the empty space around them and experimental page layouts with dissolving or overflowing panels.

Rachel Thorn calls her use of light, white space and fluid page layouts "unprecedented" in shōjo manga. She been compared to fellow manga artist Ai Yazawa for her play with depth and layering. Critic Eiji Ōtsuka considers Tsumugi's experimentation with form in her work in the second half of the 1980s as the peak of a visual trend in shōjo manga that was established by the Year 24 Group in the 1970s. This trend weakened in the 1990s, as readers had problems understanding manga with a more experimental form and instead of this a visual trend called "flatness" emerged, as seen in the works of artists Kiriko Nananan, Erica Sakurazawa and Moyoco Anno.

=== Influences ===
Tsumugi considers Fusako Kuramochi an important influence, especially in terms of framing and use of monologues.

== Legacy ==
Rachel Thorn considers Tsumugi to be the most innovative shōjo artist of the 1980s. Midori Kusaka credits her with bringing "reality" into shōjo manga by focusing on themes like abortion in "Yokohama, 14-sai, Yūko" and everyday life of ordinary high school students in the countryside in Mabataki mo Sezu, as opposed to the idealized storytelling of romance in shōjo manga before her (e.g. the idealization of boys love).

Several musicians and manga artists were influenced by her work. Daisuke Igarashi mentioned Tsumugi's experimentation with form and space as an inspiration for his own manga. Musicians Yutaka Ozaki and Kishidan lead singer SHOW cite Tsumugi as an inspiration.

Her work from the 1980s continued to be read and re-printed, especially Hot Road. Around the 50th anniversary of Margaret and Bessatsu Margaret in 2013 and 2014, Hot Road was adapted into a live-action film, original pages of the manga were featured in two exhibitions in Tokyo celebrating the anniversary and the magazines You and Bessatsu Margaret published tributes to the series. In 2016, original pages of Hot Road were exhibited in Sendai.

== Works ==
The following is a list of Tsumugi's serialized works and short story collections as well as short stories that were analyzed in literature.

Title	Year	Notes	Refs
"Machibito" (待ち人)	1982	Short story published in Bessatsu Margaret	
Ano Natsu ga Umi ni iru (あの夏が海にいる)	1984	Short story collection published by Shueisha in 1 vol. Includes the short stories "Ano Natsu ga Umi ni iru", "Shōko", "Sunset Image", "Futari no Fūkei" and "Machibito"	
"Yokohama, 14-sai, Yūko" (横浜、14歳、由子)	1984	Short story published in Bessatsu Margaret	
Yasashii Te wo Motteru (やさしい手を、もってる)	1985	Short story collection published by Shueisha in 1 vol. Includes the short stories "Yasashii Te wo Motteru", "Ano Hito no Kuruma de...", "Atarashii Tomodachi" and "Yokohama, 14-sai, Yūko"	
Tsukue wo Stage ni (机をステージに)	1984–1985	Serialized in Bessatsu Margaret; Published by Shueisha in 1 vol.	
Minna de Sotsugyō wo Utaō (みんなで卒業をうたおう)	1986	Short story collection published by Shueisha in 1 vol. Includes the short stories "Minna de Sotsugyō wo Utaō", "Korekara mo Zutto..." and "Umaku Ienai"	
Hot Road (ホットロード)	1986–1987	Serialized in Bessatsu Margaret; Published by Shueisha in 4 vol.	
Mabataki mo Sezu (瞬きもせず)	1987–1990	Serialized in Bessatsu Margaret; Published by Shueisha in 7 vol.	
Jun (純)	1991	Serialized in Bessatsu Margaret; Published by Shueisha in 1 vol.	
Kanashimi no Machi (かなしみのまち)	1994	Serialized in Bessatsu Margaret; Published by Shueisha in 2 vol.	
Chiisana Inori (小さな祈り)	1996	Short story collection published by Shueisha in 1 vol. Includes the short stories "Chiisana Inori", "Korekara mo Zutto...", "his love" and "Takashi Eien"	
My Gardener (マイ ガーデナー)	2007	Published by Seiunsha in 1 vol.	
