= My Broken Mariko =

Japanese manga series

- Volume cover, featuring Tomoyo Shiino

マイ・ブロークン・マリコ (Mai Burōkun Mariko)
- Genre: Drama
- Manga
- Written by: Waka Hirako
- Published by: Kadokawa
- English publisher: NA: Yen Press
- Magazine: Comic Bridge
- Original run: July 16, 2019 – December 17, 2019
- Volumes: 1
- icon

My Broken Mariko (Japanese: マイ・ブロークン・マリコ, Hepburn: Mai Burōkun Mariko) is a Japanese web manga series written and illustrated by Waka Hirako. It was serialized on Kadokawa's web-based manga magazine for adult women Comic Bridge from July to December 2019. A live-action film adaptation premiered in September 2022.

== Plot ==
Tomoyo Shiino, an office worker, receives news that her friend Mariko Ikagawa has died by suicide. Having met with Mariko recently without noticing any signs of distress, Tomoyo is consumed by guilt over her inability to recognize Mariko's suffering. Determined to do something for her late friend, Tomoyo resolves to steal Mariko's ashes, believing that Mariko's abusive father—who subjected her to psychological and sexual violence—would not give her a proper memorial.

Armed with a knife, Tomoyo breaks into the Ikagawa household and seizes the ashes, intending to scatter them at Marigaoaka Cape, a place Mariko had once expressed a desire to visit. However, during her journey, she is robbed of all her belongings except the ashes. Soon after, a mysterious young man named Makio appears, offering her money and assistance. Though suspicious of his intentions, Tomoyo accepts his help and eventually reaches Marigaoaka Cape.

Upon arrival, overwhelmed by grief and guilt, Tomoyo impulsively attempts to jump off a cliff. However, at the last moment, she spots a girl who bears an uncanny resemblance to Mariko being pursued by a stalker. Acting on instinct, Tomoyo rushes to intervene, setting in motion a series of events that force her to confront her own despair and the unresolved pain of Mariko's death.

== Characters ==
Tomoyo Shiino (シイノ トモヨ, Shīno Tomoyo)
Portrayed by: Mei Nagano
Mariko Ikagawa (イカガワ マリコ, Ikagawa Mariko)
Portrayed by: Nao
Makio (マキオ)
Portrayed by: Masataka Kubota
Mariko's father
Portrayed by: Toshinori Omi
Kyoko Tamura (タムラ キョウコ, Tamura Kyōko)
Portrayed by: Yō Yoshida

== Media ==
=== Manga ===
Written and illustrated by Waka Hirako, My Broken Mariko was serialized on Kadokawa's web-based manga magazine for adult women Comic Bridge from July 16 to December 17, 2019. Kadokawa collected its four chapters in a single tankōbon volume, released on January 8, 2020.

In North America, the manga was licensed for English release by Yen Press. The volume was released on November 10, 2020.

=== Live-action film ===
In January 2022, it was announced that the manga would receive a live action film adaptation, starring Mei Nagano as Shiino. The film premiered on September 30, 2022.

== Reception ==
My Broken Mariko won the Tokyo News Services' TV Bros magazine Bros. Comic Award 2020. It won the New Face Award at the 24th Japan Media Arts Festival in 2021. It ranked fourth on Takarajimasha's Kono Manga ga Sugoi! list of best manga of 2021 for female readers.
