= Kaitō Royale =

Japanese television drama series

- Starring: Tori Matsuzaka; Aya Ōmasa; Seiji Fukushi; Chansung; Nozomi Sasaki; Hiroki Aiba; Daisuke Kikuta; Teronosuke Takezai; Atomu Shimojō; Kyōko Maya
- Country of origin: Japan
- Original language: Japanese
- No. of seasons: 1
- No. of episodes: 9

Original release
- Network: TBS
- Release: 28 October – 23 December 2011

Kaitō Royale (怪盗ロワイヤル, Kaitō Rowaiyaru) is a Japanese television drama series based on a video game from DeNA. It premiered on TBS on 28 October 2011. The theme song of the series is Lock On by Yui.

== Cast ==
- Tori Matsuzaka as Rei Kamimura
- Aya Ōmasa as Karen Katagiri
- Seiji Fukushi as Taiga Kishihara
- Hwang Chan-sung as Jack
- Nozomi Sasaki as Sister Snake
- Hiroki Aiba as Kurata Keisuke
- Daisuke Kikuta as Shuhei Kazuki
- Teronosuke Takezai as Makato Mikami
- Atomu Shimojō as Yuji Nishizaki
- Kyōko Maya as Yoko Kitaba
- Tasuku Nagase as Ryota Kosugi

== Additional cast ==
- Shigemitsu Ogi as Seiya Nagura (ep. 2)
- Tatsuhito Okuda as Yasumasa Takagi (ep. 2)
- Kazue Itoh as Ritsuko Kusakabe (ep. 3)
- Kazuma Suzuki as Kazuhiko Akagawa (ep. 4)
- Mansaku Ikeuchi as Kento Hiruta (ep. 5)
- Hiroshi Watari as Sotaro Batomura (ep. 6)
- Rena Nōnen as Kaide Batomura (ep. 6)
- Taro Suruga as Yuta Ito (ep. 6)
- Kazuhiko Nishimura as Koshi Kitaba (ep. 7)
- Shunsuke Ohe as young Rei Kamimura (ep. 7)
- Himeka Asami as young Karen Katagiri (ep. 7)
- Shinji Yamashita as Hideomi Todo (eps.8–9)
- Yui (ep. 9)

== Characters ==
Rei Kamimura: Main male character, doesn't have any memories from further than one year ago. he is able to remember anything with one glance and is the brain of the team.

Karen Katagiri: Important female character, doesn't have any memories from further than one year ago. she uses her charms to get men to tell her what she wants and is an expert at stealing something when somebody isn't paying attention.

Taiga Kishihara: Important male character, doesn't have any memories from further than one year ago. he is the technological one of the group and handles anything from security to short distraction. he is a bit goofy and has a big crush on Karen.
