= Momoko Kikuchi =

Japanese singer and entertainer

Momoko Kikuchi 菊池 桃子
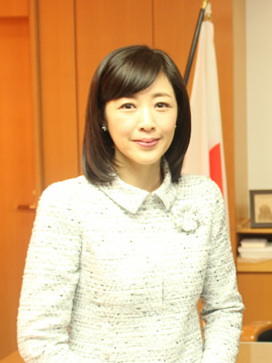

Background information
- Born: 菊池 桃子; May 4, 1968 (age 58); Shinagawa, Tokyo, Japan
- Genres: J-pop, Kayokyoku
- Occupations: Actress, entertainer, singer, scholar
- Years active: 1984–present
- Labels: VAP (1984–1991; 2020s-present); Epic/Sony Japan (1993–)
- Spouse: Tetsu Nishikawa (m. 1995; div. 2012) Hiroaki Niihara (m. 2019)

Momoko Kikuchi (菊池 桃子, Kikuchi Momoko; born May 4, 1968) is a Japanese actress, entertainer, singer, and scholar who was formerly represented by the talent agency, Parfit Production. On June 22, 2020, Kikuchi announced that she has left Parfit Production and gone independent.

Her ex-husband is professional golfer Tetsu Nishikawa. Kikuchi was also a brand adviser for such women's goods as Emom and Momokoselection.

== Biography ==
Momoko Kikuchi was born in Shinagawa, Tokyo, Japan, scouted in 1982, and started to make TV appearances in 1983. She officially made her debut as an idol in 1984, releasing her first single just before her 16th birthday, and instantly shot to fame. She produced seven consecutive no. 1 songs on the Oricon Chart from 1985 to 1987.

In the late 1980s, Kikuchi tried to shed the "idol" label and formed RA-MU, a band featuring more original material and rock music, but the band failed to be recognized. Unwilling to return to perform as an idol singing mainstream bubblegum pop, Kikuchi since shifted her focus to acting, and has been successful as an actress.

In 2011, Japanese music program Music Station held a special report counting down the Top 50 Idols of All-Time based on their singles' total sales. The list spans several decades, and Kikuchi was in the 42nd place, with a sales record of 4,110,000 copies.

In April 2014, Kikuchi celebrated her 30th anniversary in the show business by releasing her seventh album, the first since 1991, which is a re-recording of all her hit songs during her idol period.

On April 17, 2024, Kikuchi released her first EP, Eternal Harmony.

== Personal life ==
In November 2019, Kikuchi married bureaucrat Hiroaki Niihara.

Momoko Kikuchi Special Live “EMERALD”～40th Anniversary&Birthday～ was held on May 3, 2024 at Christ Shinagawa Church Gloria Chapel.

== Discography ==
=== Studio albums ===
Year	Title	Label	Sales
1984	Ocean Side	Vap	
1985	Tropic of Capricorn	Vap	JPN: 466,130+
1985	Terra Warrior Ψ Boy Original Sound Track (With Tetsuji Hayashi)	Vap	
1986	Graduation Memories	Vap	
1986	Adventure	Vap	
1986	Graduation Memories (Piano And Orchestra Version)	Vap	
1987	Escape from Dimension	Vap	
1991	Miroir	Vap	
2014	青春ラブレター 〜30th Celebration Best〜	Epic Records	
2022	Shadow	Vap	

=== EP ===
Year	Title	Label
2024	Eternal Harmony	Vap

=== Singles ===
Year	Title	Label
1984	青春のいじわる (Seishun no ijiwaru)	Vap
1984	Summer Eyes	Vap
1984	雪にかいた Love Letter	Vap
1985	Sotsugyō (Graduation)	Vap
1985	Boyのテーマ (Boy no Theme)	Vap
1985	もう逢えないかもしれない (Mō aenai ka mo shirenai)	Vap
1986	Broken Sunset	Vap
1986	Deja Vu	Vap
1986	夏色片想い (Natsu-iro kataomoi)	Vap
1986	Say Yes!	Vap
1987	アイドルを探せ (Idol o sagase)	Vap
1987	Nile in Blue	Vap
1987	ガラスの草原 (Garasu no sōgen)	Vap

=== Compilations ===
Year	Title	Label
1989	The Greatest Hits (Majestic Twelve)	Vap
1993	Special Selection 1	Vap
1993	Special Selection 2	Vap
2011	Golden ☆ Best	Vap

== Filmography ==
=== TV series ===
Year	Title	Role	Network	Notes
1985	Graduation	Momoko Watanabe	NTV	
1987	Koi wa Hi-ho!	Momoko Furuya	NTV	Lead role
1989	Kimi no Hitomi ni Koishi Teru!	Machiko Mochizuki	Fuji TV	
1989	Dō-kyū-sei	Kyoko Sakura	Fuji TV	
1990	Hotel	Kyoko Mizutani	TBS	
1990	Koi no Paradise	Shiori Nanami	Fuji TV	
1990	Yonimo Kimyōna Monogatari: Kuse	Mariko Yoshinaga	Fuji TV	
1991	Pattern B (Hana no OL-hen): Giri Choko ni o Yōjin	Noriko	TBS	Lead role
1991	Nurse Station	Mariko Nakata	TBS	Lead role
1991	Vingt Cinq Ans Kekkon	Yuko Matsunaga	Fuji TV	
1991	Jinan Jijo Hitorikko Monogatari	Arika Sayaka	TBS	
1992	Nobunaga King of Zipangu	Nōhime	NHK	Taiga drama
1992	Someday My Prince Will Come		Fuji TV	
1992	Pa Te O	Mari Egawa	Fuji TV	Lead role
1993	Ano Ni Tsu ni Kaeritai	Chiako Aoki	Fuji TV	Lead role
1993	Yellow Card	Noriko Yasaka	TBS	
1994	Tekireiki	Makoto Takase	TBS	Lead role
1994	Otokogirai	Akiitoguchi Hosokawa	TBS	Lead role
1995	Akarui Kazokukeikaku	Riko Sakamaki	Fuji TV	
2007	Yamada Tarō Monogatari	Ayako Yamada	TBS	
2007	Churaumi Kara no Nengajō	Yoshiko Morita	Fuji TV	
2008	Marumaru Chibi Maruko-chan	Takashi-kun's mother	Fuji TV	
2010	Fukusuke	Yukiko Iragashi	THK	
2010	Nyotei Kaoruko	Kaoruko Itami	TV Asahi	
2010	Nasake no Onna: Kokuzeikyoku Sasatsu-kan	Yuka Taniguchi	TV Asahi	Episode 1
2010	Ojīchan wa 25-sai	Asuka Kurihara	TBS	
2013	Glass no Ie	Hiroko Onaka	NHK	
2014	Asunaro San San Nana Hyōshi	Hiroko Fujimaki	Fuji TV	
2015	Happy Retirement	Kiyoko Yasui	TV Asahi	
2018	Boys Over Flowers Season 2	Oto Edogawa's mother	TBS	
2020	Yell	Masa Koyama	NHK	Asadora
2021	Enjoy Drinking Alone	Reika Benikawa	Wowow	

=== Films ===
Year	Title	Role	Notes
1984	Pantsu no Ana		Debut
1985	Tera Senshi PSI Boy	Momoko	Lead role
1986	Bakumatsu Seishun Grafiti Ronin Ryoma Sakamoto	Okiku	
1987	Idol o Sagase	Chikako Fujitani	Lead role
1992	Pa Te O	Mari Egawa	Lead role
1998	Sore Ike! Anpanman te no Hi-ra o Taiyō ni	Rina-chan	Voice
2005	Pokémon: Lucario and the Mystery of Mew	Irene / Rene	Voice
2011	Princess Toyotomi	Kunimatsu's mother	
2017	Peach Girl	Sakurako Adachi/Momo's mother	
2019	Angel Sign		
