= Karasu no Oyayubi =

- DVD cover
- Directed by: Tadafumi Itō
- Based on: Karasu no Oyayubi by Shusuke Michio
- Starring: Hiroshi Abe; Shoji Murakami; Satomi Ishihara; Rena Nōnen; Yu Koyanagi
- Production companies: Fox International Productions; Phantom Film
- Distributed by: 20th Century Fox Japan
- Release date: November 23, 2012 (Japan)
- Country: Japan
- Language: Japanese

Karasu no Oyayubi (Japanese: カラスの親指; lit. "Crow's Thumb") is a 2012 Japanese film directed by Tadafumi Itō and based on a novel by Shusuke Michio.

== Plot ==
Take is a middle aged man, who after losing his wife and daughter, decides to become a swindler. He convinces his colleague Tetsu to become one as well, and they both incorporate their 3 housemates, who are lower level/amateur swindlers, into the plan.

== Cast ==
- Hiroshi Abe as Take
- Shoji Murakami as Tetsu
- Satomi Ishihara as Yahiro
- Rena Nōnen as Mahiro
- Yu Koyanagi
- Bengal as Pawn Shop Owner
- Yūsuke Santamaria
- Daimaou Kosaka as Nogami
- Takeshi Nadagi as Tontonei restaurant Employee
- Shingo Tsurumi as Higuchi
- Shigeyuki Totsugi as Tontonei restaurant manager
