= Miwa Ueda =

Japanese manga artist

Miwa Ueda 上田 美和
- Born: Hyōgo, Japan
- Area: Manga artist
- Notable works: Peach Girl
- Awards: 1999 Kodansha Manga Award for shōjo - Peach Girl

Miwa Ueda (上田 美和, Ueda Miwa) is a Japanese manga artist, known for her works like Peach Girl and Angel Wars. In 1999, she received the Kodansha Manga Award for shōjo for Peach Girl.

Miwa was born on September 29 in Hyōgo, Japan. She worked for some time with Sailor Moon author Naoko Takeuchi. She started publishing her works in 1985.

== Works ==
=== Manga ===
- Kyupi No pants wa nugasanaide - Kodansha
- Kyou No watashi wa komatta Doll - Kodansha
- G senjou No Maria (1989)- Kodansha
- Jesus Christ! (1991) - Kodansha
- Oh! My Darling (1992) - Kodansha
- Imitation Gold (1994) - Kodansha
- Angel Wars (1995) - Kodansha
- Garasu no Kodou (1996) - Kodansha
- Peach Girl (1998) - Kodansha
- Peach Girl: Sae's Story (2005) - Kodansha
- Papillon -hana to chou- (2007) - Kodansha ("Butterfly: Flower and Butterfly")
- Pre Mari (2010) - Kodansha
- Rokomoko (2011–12) - Kodansha
- Peach Girl Next (2016–2019) - Kodansha

=== Film adaptation ===
- Peach Girl (2017)
