= Mei Nagano =

Japanese actress (born 1999)

- 永野 芽郁
- Nagano at the 39th Tokyo International Film Festival in October 2026
- Born: September 24, 1999 (age 27); Nishitokyo, Tokyo, Japan
- Occupation: Actress
- Years active: 2009–present
- Agent: Stardust Promotion

Mei Nagano (永野 芽郁, Nagano Mei; born September 24, 1999), is a Japanese actress who first gained attention for starring in the film My Love Story! (2015) and the 98th NHK asadora Half Blue Sky (2018). She received further recognition for the films Masked Ward (2020), And So the Baton Is Passed (2021), and Motherhood (2022).

== Early life and career ==
Mei Nagano was born in Nishitokyo, Tokyo on September 24, 1999. Her family consists of her mother, father, and an elder brother three years her senior.

Nagano was scouted in Kichijōji, Tokyo when she was in her third year of elementary school. She made her acting debut in the 2009 action-adventure film Hard Revenge Milly: Bloody Battle as a minor character. Nagano was a regular model for Japanese fashion magazines Nico☆Petite and nicola. In August 2016 she became an exclusive model for Seventeen. In 2015 she played the heroine, Rinko Yamato, in the romantic comedy film My Love Story!.

Her first lead role came in the 2016 teen drama Koe Koi as Yuiko Yoshioka, a high school student who meets a mysterious boy who wears a paper bag over his head. Later that year she provided the voice for the character Zaya in the Japanese version of the film Gods of Egypt. She also appeared in commercials for Calpis Water, Sekisui House, Townwork, UQ Mobile, and Alpen. In 2017 she starred in the romance film Daytime Shooting Star and was announced as the lead for NHK's 98th Asadora, Half Blue Sky which started airing in April 2018. For her lead role in this asadora, Nagano was named the Best Actress at the 98th Japan Television Drama Academy Awards.

In 2019, Nagano acted alongside Masaki Suda in the drama Mr. Hiiragi's Homeroom, and was named Best Supporting Actress at the 100th Japan Television Drama Academy Awards for her role. In 2022, Nagano was nominated in the Best Actress category for her role in the 2021 film And So the Baton Is Passed at the 45th Japan Academy Film Prize. She was also named Best Actress at the 64th Blue Ribbon Awards for her role in the same film. She then appeared in the drama Unicorn ni Notte. She also starred in the live-action film adaptation of the manga My Broken Mariko which was released in September 2022.

== Filmography ==
=== Film ===
Year	Title	Role	Notes	Ref.
2009	Hard Revenge Milly: Bloody Battle			
2010	Zebraman 2: Attack on Zebra City	Sumire		
2010	Watashi no Yasashiku nai Senpai	young Yamako Iriomote		
2012	Rurouni Kenshin	Sanjō Tsubame		
2012	Gachipan: Ultra Max	Seira		
2015	A Stitch of Life	Mari		
2015	My Love Story!	Rinko Yamato		
2017	Daytime Shooting Star	Suzume Yosano	Lead role	
2017	Parks	Haru		
2017	Teiichi: Battle of Supreme High	Mimiko Shiratori		
2017	Peach Girl	Sae Kashiwagi		
2017	Mixed Doubles	Airi Ogasawara		
2019	You Shine in the Moonlit Night	Mamizu Watarase	Lead role	
2019	NiNoKuni	Kotona and Asha (voice)		
2020	Masked Ward	Hitomi Kawasaki		
2021	It's a Flickering Life	Young Yoshiko		
2021	Jigoku no Hanazono: Office Royale	Naoko Tanaka	Lead role	
2021	And So the Baton Is Passed	Yūko Morimiya	Lead role	
2022	My Broken Mariko	Tomoyo Shiino	Lead role	
2022	Motherhood	Sayaka	Lead role	
2023	Mom, Is That You?!	Mai		
2024	Teasing Master Takagi-san Movie	Takagi	Lead role	
2024	Cells at Work!	Erythrocyte / Red Blood Cell (AE3803)	Lead role	
2025	Blank Canvas: My So-Called Artist's Journey	Akiko Hayashi	Lead role	
2026	My Crazy Feminist Girlfriend	She	Lead role	

=== Television drama ===
Year	Title	Role	Notes	Ref.
2010	Hagane no Onna	Young Ineko Haga	Episode 6	
2011	Tokidoki Mayomayo	Tamako	Episode 36: Onee-chan to Yobanaide	
2011	ABU Asia Kodomo Drama Series	Mizuki Mishima	Season 7, episode 2: "Ensoku"	
2011	True Horror Stories: Summer 2011	The patient	Short drama	
2012	Stand Up! Vanguard	Sumire Mizuhara	Television film	
2013	Yae's Sakura	Young Yamakawa Tokiwa	Taiga drama	
2014	Platonic	Sari Mochizuki		
2014	The Man of the Tokyo Olympics	Teen Grace Miyako Wada	Television film	
2015	Suiyo Mystery 9: Hoshin	Chinatsu Miyashita	Television film	
2015	High School Chorus	Miki Kondo	Episode 3	
2015	Summer Stalker Blues	Aki Nakajō		
2015	Teddy Go!	Anne Amano		
2015	Chō Gentei Nōryoku	Miyuki Hashida		
2016	Love That Makes You Cry	Remi Funakawa		
2016	Koe Koi	Yuiko Yoshioka	Lead role	
2016	Sanada Maru	Senhime	Taiga drama	
2017	Super Salaryman Mr. Saenai	Momoko Sasahara	Episode 8	
2017	Fugitive Boys	Renko Aokawa		
2018	Half Blue Sky	Suzume Nireno	Lead role; Asadora	
2019	Mr. Hiiragi's Homeroom	Sakura Kayano	Lead role	
2020	Daddy is My Classmate	Sakura Obika		
2021	Ichikei's Crow: The Criminal Court Judges	Defendant	Cameo	
2021	Police in a Pod	Mai Kawai	Lead role	
2022	Riding a Unicorn	Sana Narukawa	Lead role	
2023	Burn the House Down	Anzu Murata	Lead role	
2024	The Gift of Your Heart	Ame Aihara	Lead role	
2025	Brighter Days	Saho Takahashi	Lead role; television film	
2025	News Anchor	Hana Sakikubo		
TBA	The Night Queen of Himachi	Ayane Ichijo	Lead role; also producer	

=== Other television ===
Year	Title	Notes	Ref.
2018	69th NHK Kōhaku Uta Gassen	As a judge	
2020	Terrace House: Tokyo 2019–2020	Guest studio commentator for episodes 33–36	

=== Japanese dub ===
Year	Title	Role	Voice dub for	Notes	Ref.
2016	Gods of Egypt	Zaya	Courtney Eaton		

=== Music video appearances ===
Year	Artist	Title	Ref.
2011	Funky Monkey Babys	"Love Song"	
2013	Southern All Stars	"Eikō no Otoko"	
2015	She's	"Long Goodbye"	
2016	Sakura Shimeji	Hidarimune	

== Bibliography ==
=== Magazines ===
- Ribon, Shueisha 1995-, as an exclusive model since 2010
- Nico☆Petite, Shinchosha 2006-, as an exclusive model from 2010 to 2013
- nicola, Shinchosha 1997-, as an exclusive model from 2013 to 2016
- Seventeen, Shueisha 1967-, as an exclusive model since 2016

=== Photobooks ===
- Moment (2019)
- No cambia (2020)
- Magnolie (2026)

== Awards and nominations ==
Year	Award	Category	Work(s)	Result	Ref.
2019	43rd Elan d'or Awards	Newcomer of the Year	Herself	Won	
2021	34th Nikkan Sports Film Awards	Best Supporting Actress	It's a Flickering Life	Nominated	
2021	46th Hochi Film Awards	Best Supporting Actress	It's a Flickering Life	Nominated	
2021	46th Hochi Film Awards	Best Actress	And So the Baton Is Passed, etc.	Won	
2022	64th Blue Ribbon Awards	Best Actress	And So the Baton Is Passed, Jigoku no Hanazono: Office Royale	Won	
2022	45th Japan Academy Film Prize	Best Actress	And So the Baton Is Passed	Nominated	
2022	47th Hochi Film Awards	Best Actress	Motherhood and My Broken Mariko	Nominated	
2023	77th Mainichi Film Awards	Best Actress	My Broken Mariko	Nominated	
2023	46th Japan Academy Film Prize	Best Supporting Actress	Motherhood	Nominated	
2024	47th Japan Academy Film Prize	Best Supporting Actress	Mom, Is That You?!	Nominated	
