= Hot Road =

Japanese manga series

- Cover of the first tankōbon volume as published by Shueisha

ホットロード
- Genre: Yankī; Romantic drama
- Manga
- Written by: Taku Tsumugi
- Published by: Shueisha
- English publisher: Shueisha (digital)
- Imprint: Margaret Comics
- Magazine: Bessatsu Margaret
- Original run: January 1986 – May 1987
- Volumes: 4
- Live-action film
- Directed by: Takahiro Miki
- Written by: Taku Tsumugi
- Studio: Shochiku
- Released: August 16, 2014

Hot Road (ホットロード) is a Japanese manga series written and illustrated by Taku Tsumugi. It was adapted into a live action film that was released on 16 August 2014. Shueisha began publishing the manga in English on its Manga Million digital platform in 2026.

== Characters ==
- Kazuki Miyaichi lives with her mother. Kazuki does not like her mother's boyfriend and she feels that she is not loved by her mother. This leads Kazuki to get into trouble.
- Kazuki's mother
- Hiroshi Haruyama is a troubled kid who does part-time jobs for a living instead of going to school. He is a member of the motorcycle gang "Nights".
- Tōru Tamami

== Live-action film ==
A live-action film based on the manga was released on August 16, 2014.Takahiro Miki directed the film. The film stars Rena Nōnen as Kazuki Miyaichi and Hiroomi Tosaka as Hiroshi Haruyama.
