= Daisuke Kikuta =

Japanese actor (born 1988)

- 菊田大輔
- Born: December 1, 1988 (age 37); Tokyo, Japan
- Occupation: Actor
- Years active: 2010–present
- Known for: Clone Baby

Daisuke Kikuta (菊田大輔, Kikuta Daisuke), born December 1, 1988, is a Japanese actor best known for his role as Fujiyama Shuntaro in Atsuhime number 1 and as his minor roles in such works as The Incite Mill, Clone Baby and Kaitō Royale.

== Filmography ==
=== Film ===
- The Incite Mill (2010)
- Gakudori (2011)
- Ouran High School Host Club (2012) – Tōgō-in Makoto (American football Deputy)
- Atsuhime number 1 (2012) – Fujiyama Shuntaro
- Torihada: Gekijouban (2012)
- Peach Girl (2017)

=== Television ===
- Clone Baby (2010) – Mikumo Gota
- Genya (2010) – Aoe Shinichiro
- Shima Shima (2011) – Futaba Ran
- Kaitō Royale (2011) – Shuhei Kazuki
- Nanase, the Telepathy Girl's Ballad (2012) – Katsumi Takemura
- MONSTERS (2012) – Hayato Kudo
- Ashita Switch (2012) – Himself
- Sōmatō kabushikigaisha (2012 TV Mini-Series) – Akira imaizumi (ep 7)
- Kakushō: Keishichō sōsa 3 ka (2013 TV Mini-Series) – Alberto José Tanaka (ep 8)
- Tokyo Toy Box (2013 TV Mini-Series) – Masashi Kaneda
- Matori no onna: Kōsei Rōdōshō Mayaku Torishimarikan (2014 TV Movie)
- Sanbiki no ossan (2014 TV Mini-Series)
- SHARK (2014 TV Mini-Series) – Okazaki Hayato (ep 4-5)
- Shinigami kun (2014 TV Mini-Series) – Nagatomo Yusuke (ep 9)
- Giga Tokyo Toy Box (2014 TV Mini-Series) – Masashi Kaneda
- Yoru no sensei (2014 TV Mini-Series) – Seiya

=== Stage ===
- Romeo and Juliet (2014) as Paris
