= Amachan =

Japanese television drama series

- Genre: Home drama, Drama
- Written by: Kankuro Kudo
- Directed by: Tsuyoshi Inoue; Teruyuki Yoshida; Toki Kajiwara
- Starring: Rena Nōnen; Kyōko Koizumi; Toshinori Omi; Tetta Sugimoto; Eri Watanabe; Hiroko Yakushimaru; Keizō Kanie; Nobuko Miyamoto
- Narrated by: Nobuko Miyamoto; Rena Nōnen; Kyōko Koizumi
- Composer: Otomo Yoshihide
- Country of origin: Japan
- Original language: Japanese
- No. of episodes: 156

Production
- Producers: Kei Kurube; Hiroshi Kashi
- Running time: 15 minutes

Original release
- Network: NHK
- Release: April 1 – September 28, 2013

Amachan (あまちゃん) is a Japanese television drama series. It debuted on April 1, 2013, and was broadcast until September 28, 2013. It was scripted by Kankurō Kudō and starred Rena Nōnen as Aki Amano, a high-school girl from Tokyo who moves to the Sanriku Coast in the Tohoku region to become a female diver. She becomes a local idol, then returns to Tokyo to try to become a real idol, and finally returns to Tohoku to help revitalize the area after the Great East Japan earthquake. It is the 88th NHK Asadora. Amachan was not only a ratings success, but brought economic benefits to the Tohoku region and was considered a social phenomenon. It also won the Galaxy Award for best television program of 2013.

== Synopsis ==
=== Hometown chapter (Episode 1 - Episode 72) ===
Haruko Amano left the small northern seaside town of Sodegahama 24 years ago and has not returned since. When her childhood friend Daikichi emails her with news that her mother has collapsed, she rushes back with her 16-year-old daughter Aki in tow. It was all a ruse, however: Haruko's mother Natsu is fine.

Sodegahama depends on the ama, the women who dive for sea urchins and shellfish, as a tourist attraction. With all the ama over 50, Daikichi was hoping to convince Haruko to start diving. Haruko refuses, but Aki, who was a shy and gloomy girl in Tokyo, suddenly brightens and declares she wants to be an ama. Despite her father's pleas, she decides not to return to Tokyo and instead enroll at the local high school, where she makes friends with Yui, who wants to become an idol. Success as an ama does not come easily: Aki cannot catch a sea urchin on her own until the 24th episode. Yui wins a contest to become the publicity character of the Kitasanriku Railroad. When Yui's older brother Hiroshi takes a job at the local tourism bureau and uploads videos of his sister on the town website, train otaku begin flooding the town.

Hiroshi has a secret liking for Aki, and his videos of her, especially after she catches her first sea urchin, make her as big a sensation as Yui. At school, Aki falls in love with Kōichi Taneichi, a third-year student in the underwater engineering course, and decides to enroll as well. She and Haruko experience a shock when Chūbei, Haruko's father who they thought was dead, suddenly appears in town. Natsu had apparently thought it too much trouble to correct their impression he was dead. Aki's father Masamune also comes to town hoping to get back together with his wife, but Haruko insists on a divorce.

Around that time Aki and Yui learn that Haruko had left Sodegahama originally to become an idol and had failed. This puts pressure on the two girls, on whose shoulders rest the hopes for the Kitasanriku Railroad's survival. But their relationship becomes strained when Aki finds out that Koichi is going out with Yui. They get back together, however, to perform on a special train in support of the railroad. The event is a great success and Yui begins to appear on local television. Haruko makes Aki promise that was her last performance as an idol. Yui then finds out that Mizuguchi, a man from Tokyo seemingly residing in town to mine amber, is really a talent scout. She tries to leave town with him but is stopped by Daikichi and the others. Yui holes up in her room and only emerges when Aki arranged for them to perform again at the Ama Cafe she and the other divers started. Haruko slaps her when she finds out she broke her promise, but Aki then declares she wants to become an idol, too. She only lets her daughter go to Tokyo after hearing how much she admired her mother's singing.

=== Tokyo chapter ===
==== First-half (Episode 73 - Episode 132) ====
On the day before they are scheduled to go to Tokyo, Yui's father collapses and Aki has to go alone. There she is a member of GMT47, a still incomplete group of idols from Japan's 47 prefectures produced by Taiichi Aramaki, who are currently just the bottom rung in Aramaki's idol empire, relegated to mostly doing backstage work. Aki runs into Koichi, but finds out he has quit his job as a diver. She also encounters Hiromi Suzuka, her favorite actress, who happens to know Aramaki. Through Aramaki's influence, Aki starts working as Suzuka's assistant, on top of her idol training. Meanwhile, Yui's mother runs away from home, sparking Yui to turn into a juvenile delinquent until Haruko stops her. Things are tough for Aki as well when Aramaki announces a general election involving all his idols: those who finish below 40th place will be fired. The six members of GMT47 feels this means the end of their careers until Aki sparks them to begin their own campaign. Their efforts largely succeed, but election day was bad for Aki: she only reached number 40 because another girl quit, and she flubbed her first acting role. Told by both Suzuka and Aramaki that she has no future, she returns to Kitasanriku depressed.

Aki only comes back after Mizuguchi and her Tokyo friends encourage her to continue. Yui too, who's given up on being an idol, prompts her to go. But on the train back, Aki finds a letter from her mother revealing that Aramaki had used Haruko when she had tried to become an idol, making her secretly serve as Harumi Suzuka's singing voice—because Suzuka could not sing—and effectively blocking her career. When Aramaki cancels GMT's debut single, Aki confronts him, asking if it is because she is Haruko's daughter. He says yes, and in front of only her and Mizuguchi, declares he will not let her succeed as an idol in his agency. Fired, Aki phones Haruko pleading to go home, but Haruko, like her mother before her, refuses her request. Instead, Haruko goes to Tokyo. Haruko, Aramaki and Suzuka meet by chance at the sushi restaurant, but it is Suzuka's threat to quit acting if Aki is not re-hired that saves her job. GMT finally get to record their debut single, but when Aramaki heavily manipulates their voices electronically, Haruko gets mad that Aki, like her, will not be able to sing in her own voice. Aki is again fired and Haruko decides to start her own talent agency, "3J". Mizuguchi also quits and becomes Aki's manager. GMT's single becomes a hit when Aramaki puts all his resources behind it, while Aki sees little success at first. But things look up when she finally lands a starring role in a children's program, which leads to a contract with a juku to appear in their ads. The contract stipulates, however, that Aki cannot have a boyfriend for a year — just when Aki and Koichi agree to begin going out. Meanwhile, Aki's fame prompts Yui's mother to seek out Haruko, who arranges for her to return to Sodegahama, even though Yui has a hard time accepting her. Natsu also visits Tokyo, revealing a past in which she herself was kind of an "idol".

To sell his idols, Aramaki decides to produce a remake of Memory of the Rising Tide (Shiosai no Memorī), the film that helped launch Suzuka's career. The eponymous song—really sung by Haruko—was also Suzuka's first hit. Suzuka is to appear in the remake, but it is on her insistence that the lead is to be decided by audition, enabling Aki to apply. With Suzuka's help, Aki passes through one stage of the audition after another. But at one point, Natsu collapses in Sodegahama and Haruko leaves to tend her. Mizuguchi also finds Koichi in Aki's apartment and urges the couple to cool down. In the end, Aramaki, in part feeling guilt over what he did to Haruko, opts for the better actress over his own idol and selects Aki for the starring role. Filming does not always go smoothly, but with Suzuka's help, Aki is able fulfill her role. During recording of the theme song, however, Suzuka finally learns for sure that Haruko had served as her voice in her songs. Haruko, who had returned to Tokyo, Aramaki, and Suzuka are finally able to settle old scores. Suzuka even switches to 3J.

==== Second-half (Episode 133 - Episode 156) ====
But only days after the film is released and the day before Aki was going to rejoin GMT in a concert, the Great East Japan earthquake takes place. Luckily, no one in Sodegahama is injured, but Yui suffers a shock from the tsunami damage. Aki tries to carry on in Tokyo, but finally decides to return north. She finds a town suffering: the Ama Cafe is closed and the tsunami practically destroyed the urchin population. Aki, however, rallies the town. Koichi arrives from Tokyo to help with clearing the damaged sea bed, and even Mizuguchi shows up, having taken leave of 3J. Meanwhile, in Tokyo, not only Aramaki and Suzuka, but also Haruko and Masamune decide to get married. Yui initially resists Aki's plans to revive their idol duo, but eventually agrees to perform on their special train again. Everyone in Tokyo and Tohoku is surprised, however, when Suzuka declares she will do a charity concert in Sodegahama. This spurs the town to finally clean up the Ama Cafe and Haruko to give Suzuka voice training lessons. Suzuka, however, miraculously sings beautifully at the Ama Cafe. The concert is then followed by a marriage ceremony featuring three couples: not only Suzuka and Aramaki and Haruko and Masamune, but also Daikichi and Sayuri. The next day, July 1, 2012, the ama begin their diving season to a now bountiful sea and Aki and Yui sing "Memory of the Rising Tide" on their special train.

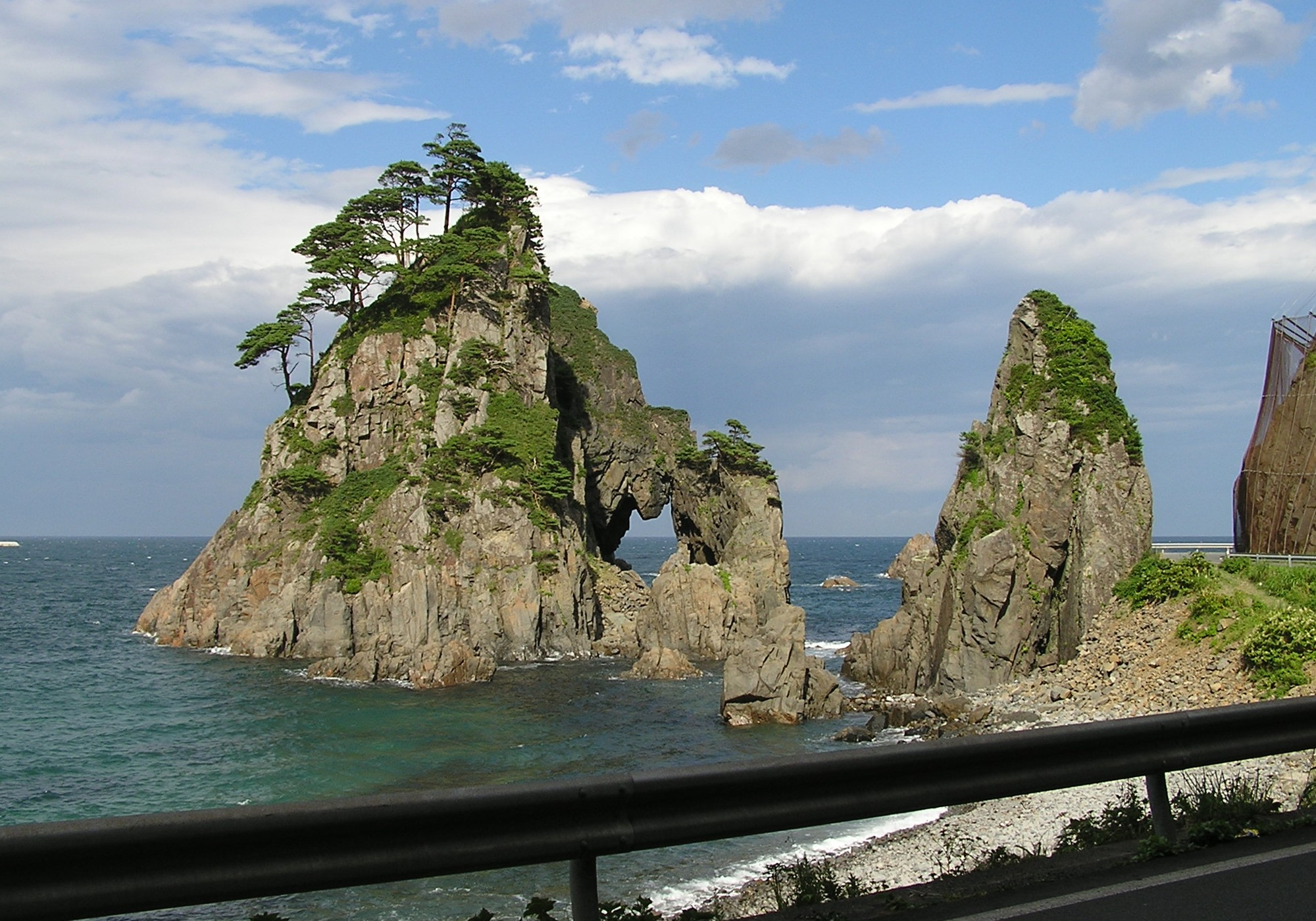
The Kosode Coast in Kuji, the location of Sodegahama in Amachan

== Cast ==
- Rena Nōnen as Aki Amano, a heroine (also as narrator on Tokyo chapter from episode 73 - episode 132)
- Kyōko Koizumi as Haruko Amano, Aki's mother (also as narrator on Tokyo chapter from episode 133 - episode 156)
  - Kasumi Arimura as Haruko Amano, age 18
- Nobuko Miyamoto as Natsu Amano, Aki's grandmother (also as narrator from episode 1 - episode 72)
- Toshinori Omi as Masamune Kurokawa, Aki's father
  - Ryu Morioka as young Masamune Kurokawa
- Teppei Koike as Hiroshi Adachi, Yui's older brother
- Ai Hashimoto as Yui Adachi, Aki's best friend and Hiroshi's younger sister
- Keizo Kanie as Chūbee Amano, Aki's grandfather
- Eri Watanabe as Yayoi Konno, an ama
- Daikichi Sugawara as Atsushi Konno, her husband
- Hana Kino as Katsue Osanai, an ama
- Denden as Rokurō Osanai, her husband
- Jun Miho as Misuzu Kumagai, an ama
- Hairi Katagiri as Sayuri Anbe, an ama
- Tetta Sugimoto as Daikichi Ōmukai, the station master
  - Masahiro Higashide as young Daikichi Ōmukai
- Yoshiyoshi Arakawa as Masayoshi Yoshida, Daikichi's assistant
- Mitsuru Fukikoshi as Tamotsu Sugawara, head of the tourism bureau
- Sei Hiraizumi as Isao Adachi, Hiroshi and Yui's father
- Akiko Yagi as Yoshie Adachi, Hiroshi and Yui's mother
- Sansei Shiomi as Ben Oda, an amber miner
- Ryuhei Matsuda as Takuma Mizuguchi, a talent scout
- Sota Fukushi as Kōichi Taneichi, Aki's senior in high school
- Arata Furuta as Taichi Aramaki, a talent company president
- Magy as Kōsaku Kawashima, Amejo's Chief Manager
- Rika Adachi as Megu Arima, ex-center of Amejo
- Mayu Matsuoka as Shiori Iruma, GMT leader from Saitama
- Ito Ohno as Mana Endō, GMT member from Fukuoka
- Rio Yamashita as Ayumi Miyashita, ex-GMT member from Tokushima
- Honami Kurashita as Ellen-kyan, GMT member from Okinawa
- Mio Yūki as Kaoruko Onodera, GMT member from Miyagi
- Hiroko Yakushimaru as Hiromi Suzuka, an actress
- Pierre Taki as Umezu, a sushi chef
- Suzuki Matsuo as Kai, a café owner
- Inori Minase as Rina Narita

== Reception ==
Amachan was a ratings success, earning an average 20.6% rating over the span of the series, second amongst Asadora only to Umechan Sensei (at 20.7%) in the last decade. Amachan, however, topped Umechan Sensei in NHK satellite TV ratings (5.5% to 4.7%), indicating to some observers that it had reached viewers new to morning dramas, and was watched by more viewers than the ratings show. Some noted how social media became a prominent aspect of the viewership of Amachan. Its success was called a "social phenomenon", as the series gave birth to such popular new phrases as "jejeje" (to indicate surprise). "Jejeje" was selected as one of the four words of the year (ryūkōgo) in 2013. The series was also broadcast in Taiwan, Thailand and the Philippines.

The series was said to bring ¥32.8 billion yen in economic benefits to the stricken Tohoku region. Riding the success of the series, the soundtrack for Amachan reached number 5 on the Oricon Albums Chart, and the album collecting songs from the show hit number 1. Kyōko Koizumi's version of the song Shiosai no Memorī reached number 2 on the Oricon Singles Chart. Banking on the success of the series, NHK devoted some 30 minutes of its 4-hour 25 minute Kohaku Uta Gassen broadcast on 31 December 2013 to songs and skits from the drama, a first for an Asadora.

== Awards ==
Amachan was awarded the Grand Prix for best television program of 2013 at the 51st Galaxy Awards, given out by the Japan Council for Better Television and Radio.

Preceded by Jun to Ai	Asadora; 1 April 2013 – 28 September 2013	Succeeded by Gochisōsan
