= Yuika Motokariya =

Japanese actress (born 1987)

- Born: September 8, 1987 (age 38); Tokyo, Japan
- Occupation: Actress
- Years active: 2001–present
- Notable credit(s): Kaori Sekiguchi in Swing Girls (2004); Yuu Kido in the asadora Fight (2005)
- Website: http://www.motokari.jp/

Yuika Motokariya (本仮屋 ユイカ, Motokariya Yuika; born September 8, 1987 in Tokyo) is a Japanese actress. She is signed with the Stardust Promotion agency.

== Filmography ==
=== Dramas ===
- 3 nen B gumi Kinpachi sensei Season 6 (2001)
- Satokibi Batake no Uta (2003)
- Sekai no Chuushin de, Ai wo Sakebu (2004)
- Fight (2005)
- Boku no Aruku Michi (2006)
- Taro & Jiro (2007)
- Sugata Sanshiro (2007)
- Fufudo (2007)
- Arigatou! Champy (2008)
- Beyond the Break (2008), Japanese dubbing
- Bara no nai Hanaya (2008)
- Himitsu (TV Asahi, 2010)
- Yamato Nadeshiko Shichi Henge (TBS, 2010, ep5-6)
- Propose Kyodai (Fuji TV, 2011)
- Suitei Yuuzai (WOWOW, 2012)
- Soko o Nantoka (BS Premium, 2012)
- Engawa Deka (Tokyo Broadcasting System Television, 2013)
- Tamiou (TV Asahi, 2015)
- Kenji no Honkai (TV Asahi, 2016)
- Sakura no Oyakodon (Tōkai Television Broadcasting, 2017)
- Love or Not (Fuji TV, 2017)
- Confidence Man JP (Fuji TV, 2018), ep2
- Fukushuu Sousa (TV Asahi, 2018)

=== Movies ===
- Warau Kaeru (2002)
- Swing Girls (2004) – Kaori Sekiguchi (Trombone)
- Love Letter So-renka (2006)
- Kissho Tennyo (2007)
- Dear Friends (2007)
- Aibo the Movie (2008)
- Drop (2009)
- Railways (2010)
- We Were There: First Love (2012)
- We Were There: True Love (2012)
- Peach Girl (2017)
- Ultraman Geed the Movie (2017) – Airu Higa
- The Grapes of Joy (2021)

=== Commercials ===
- Matsumoto Kiyoshi Co., Ltd. (2004)
- Kawai Jyuku (2004)
- Final Fantasy Crystal Chronicles: Ring of Fates (2007)
- Mitsubishi Motors (2013)
- Nestle Japan (2014)

=== Photobook ===
- Motokariya, Wani Bukkusu, 2006, ISBN 9784847029752
