= Peach Girl =

Japanese manga series by Miwa Ueda

- First tankōbon volume cover

ピーチガール (Pīchi Gāru)
- Genre: Romantic comedy; Teen drama
- Manga
- Written by: Miwa Ueda
- Published by: Kodansha
- English publisher: NA: Kodansha USA Tokyopop (former)
- Magazine: Bessatsu Friend
- English magazine: Smile
- Original run: September 13, 1997 – December 13, 2003
- Volumes: 18
- Anime television series
- Directed by: Hiroshi Ishiodori
- Written by: Hiroko Tokita
- Music by: Masanori Takumi
- Studio: Studio Comet
- Original network: TV Tokyo
- Original run: January 8, 2005 – June 25, 2005
- Episodes: 25
- Manga

Peach Girl: Sae's Story
- Written by: Miwa Ueda
- Published by: Kodansha
- English publisher: NA: Tokyopop
- Magazine: Bessatsu Friend
- Original run: September 13, 2004 – May 13, 2006
- Volumes: 3
- Manga

Peach Girl Next
- Written by: Miwa Ueda
- Published by: Kodansha
- English publisher: NA: Kodansha USA
- Magazine: Be Love
- Original run: August 12, 2016 – December 28, 2019
- Volumes: 8
- Live-action film
- Directed by: Koji Shintoku
- Written by: Junpei Yamaoka
- Released: May 20, 2017

Peach Girl (Japanese: ピーチガール, Hepburn: Pīchi Gāru) is a Japanese manga series by Miwa Ueda. A high school drama centered on character Momo Adachi, her love life, friendships and rivalries, it was published in Japan by Kodansha in Bessatsu Friend from 1998 to 2003 and collected in 18 volumes. The series was adapted as a Taiwanese drama in 2002 and Japanese anime television series in 2005. A manga sequel set ten years after the original, titled Peach Girl Next, began its serialization on Be Love on August 12, 2016. It ended with a total of eight volumes, the last of which was released in January 2020. On mid-March 2016, the live-action film adaptation was announced. The film was released in Japan on May 20, 2017.

The North American version of the manga is published by Kodansha USA, with all 18 volumes under the same title. It was previously published in two parts by Tokyopop: Peach Girl, covering the first eight volumes of the Japanese release; and Peach Girl: Change of Heart, comprising the final ten books. The anime is distributed by Funimation, currently known as Crunchyroll in North America.

== Plot ==
Momo Adachi is a former member of the high school swim team. She does tan easily and her hair is bleached out; unfortunately, she is stereotyped by her ignorant classmates and is forced to endure rumors about being an "easy girl" who has had many sexual relationships. Her only friend is Sae, who is actually responsible for spreading the nasty gossip due to her jealousy of Momo. Momo is in love with Toji, a taciturn baseball player, but the scheming Sae also has her sights set on the boy. Momo's life is further complicated with the introduction of Kairi Okayasu, a wise-cracking playboy who is determined to make her his. He reveals to Momo that she had saved him from drowning the summer before high school started.

Things become even more complicated when Sae, in an attempt to make Momo miserable, spreads rumors about Momo and Kairi making out. The rumor about the kiss between the two is true, but it was Kairi who initiated it while Momo remained stunned by the interaction. When Toji is hospitalized, Sae convinces Toji to break up with Momo. Thanks to Kairi and Sae's lies again, he finds out about all the lies and spreads rumors that Sae has made up, then tells the truth about him and Momo, resulting in the students apologizing to Momo and hating Sae. Toji and Momo get back together. However, Sae later tries to make their relationship complicated again by threatening to discredit Momo with her newly acquired access to the mass media. Although Toji is initially defiant, he breaks up with Momo to protect her in a reluctant manner. Momo was initially heartbroken due to not knowing that it was part of Sae's schemes, but eventually begins dating Kairi, whom she had previously considered annoying and begins to fall in love with him. When it is revealed to Momo why Toji broke up with her, Momo is left to choose between Toji and Kairi.

In "Sae's Story", Sae is left back for one year as she was always skipping classes. She is too stubborn so she goes to Momo's and Kairi's university everyday. Toji goes to a good university by himself. Sae meets one of her childhood sweethearts, Kanji, who left for Malaysia when they were young, and promised to marry Sae when he returned. As Kanji falls in love with Sae, he follows her around, trying to win her over. He takes care of Sae's dog, Sora, when her parents would no longer let her keep it. The dog walks with a little limp. One day, when Sora tried to follow Sae, she threw a rock at its paw and injured it. Sae starts modeling and pretends she goes to college with Momo when she is still in high school. She meets Honda and works for CC as a model. She meets a guy named Takuma, only for him to reject his confession. Sae meets another guy named Shinji but realizes he never loved her. Those situations make Sae realize that Momo, Kairi, and Kanji are the only people who care for her.

== Characters ==
Momo Adachi (安達 もも, Adachi Momo)
Voiced by: Saeko Chiba (Japanese); Kate Oxley (English)
Played by: Mizuki Yamamoto (Live Action 2017)
Momo is the main protagonist with tan skin and light hair, derived from her constant swimming in chlorinated pools while on the swim team. She mistakenly gives others the impression that she is a "beach bunny", lover of the Ganguro style, or sexually promiscuous. On the inside, Momo is a shy and insecure girl. She has loved Toji for many years, only to herself falling in love with Kairi. When Momo found out Toji disliked girls with tan skin, she started to avoid swimming pools and wore a lot of sunblock to get her skin to its original color, presumed to be fair. Later on, Momo finds out that Toji never said he disliked girls with tan skin. Ryoko, her from junior high school, had made that up because she had liked him too. Momo is often confused later on when she likes both Toji and Kairi at the same time, causing several disputes between the two boys.
Sae Kashiwagi (柏木 さえ, Kashiwagi Sae)
Voiced by: Megumi Nasu (Japanese); Cherami Leigh (English)
Played by: Mei Nagano (Live Action 2017)
Sae is the main antagonist who does everything to ruin Momo's life. Her fair features such as her pale skin and dark hair serve as a contrast for Momo, with "innocent" appearance highlighting her mischief and troublemaking nature. She is the one who spreads malicious gossip about Momo, something Momo knows but has trouble dealing, with as people believe in Sae more than the "airheaded ganguro girl" to the point that Toji believed Sae over Momo. She often uses the gossip to make people dislike Momo as a result of her own jealousy and insecurity.
Kairi Okayasu (岡安 浬, Okayasu Kairi)
Voiced by: Kenichi Suzumura (Japanese); Orion Pitts (English)
Played by: Kei Inoo (Live Action 2017)
Kairi is Momo's popular and carefree classmate. He has the reputation of being a playboy, something he is not exactly proud of. Kairi thought that Momo was the one who once gave him CPR when he almost drowned at the beach when they were younger, only to later find out he had been saved by the local male lifeguard. Once the two started dating, his insecurities about relationships are revealed to stem from his unrequited love for Misao, the school nurse and Kairi's former tutor. However, after Kairi confesses and is shot down by her, he actually feels relieved and confident to pursue his relationship with Momo.
The English-language manga translation uses the non-standard romanization "Kiley Okayasu" Other sites, such as Funimation, Kodansha Japan, and non-English-language publishers, use "Kairi". The English version of Peach Girl NEXT uses Kairi.
Kazuya "Toji" Tojigamori (東寺ヶ森 一矢, Tōjigamori Kazuya)
Voiced by: Hidenobu Kiuchi (Japanese); Robert McCollum (English)
Played by: Mackenyu (Live Action 2017)
Nicknamed "Toji" (とーじ, Tōji), he is a boy who has been Momo's crush since junior high school, but she never confessed to him due to a friend saying Toji dislikes girls with tan skin. He has a good heart, but tends to be hard-headed and oblivious to what is in front of him, believing what Sae says over Momo much to the frustration of the latter.
Misao Aki (安芸 操, Aki Misao)
Voiced by: Mami Kingetsu (Japanese); Colleen Clinkenbeard (English)
Played by: Yuika Motokariya (Live Action 2017)
Misao is the school nurse and a big sister figure for Momo. She was once Kairi's tutor and crush as well as an old flame of Ryo's. Misao was dating and broke up with Kairi, but still loves him.
Ryo Okayasu (岡安 涼, Okayasu Ryō)
Voiced by: Sho Hayami (Japanese); Charles Baker (English)
Played by: Kensei Mikami (Live Action 2017)
Ryo is Kairi's older brother who works in the video game industry and is considered the male counterpart of Sae. He is in love with Misao and was dating her briefly, but Misao broke up with him due to his cold and manipulating attitude, which stemmed from Sae hurting Misao.
Goro Ooji (大路 吾郎, Ōji Gorō)
Voiced by: Junichi Suwabe (Japanese); Viktor Walker (English)
Played by: Daisuke Kikuta (Live Action 2017)
Nicknamed Jigoro (ジゴロー, Jigorō), Ooji is a male model who is smitten with Sae and unaware of her true personality. She uses him in her schemes against Momo.
Morika
Voiced by: Miho Yamada (Japanese); Kira Vincent-Davis (English)
Morika is young woman who was once dating the Okayasu brothers. She has a grudge against Ryo and tries to use Kairi against him. Morika hires some thugs to punch Ryo as revenge for using her.

== Media ==
=== Manga ===
After the run of the original manga, a sequel titled Peach Girl: Sae's Story (裏 ピーチガール, Ura Peach Girl; lit. 'Reverse Peach Girl') was published in Japan by Kodansha in Bessatsu Friend from 2004 to 2006 and collected in three tankōbon volumes. It is told from the point of view of Sae, the main antagonist of Peach Girl. It is licensed in North America by Tokyopop.

=== Anime ===
No.	Title	Directed by	Written by	Original release date
1	"Love Hurricane!"; Transliteration: "Rabu Harikēn!" (Japanese: ラブ・ハリケーン！)	Hiroshi Ishiodori	Hiroko Tokita	January 8, 2005
Momo Adachi begins having dark skin and chlorined red hair after joining the swimming club in middle school. Toji, the boy Momo has loved for years, is rumored to only date girls with lighter complexions than him. When Sae Kashiwagi appears, Momo is afraid that Sae will try to steal Toji and claims to being in love with a random boy in the hall. The boy Momo mentioned happens to be Kairi Okayasu, the most popular yet playboy one in her class. Even worse, Sae starts spreading rumors about him and Momo, leading to a love triangle between Kairi, Toji, and Momo.
2	"Trap Kiss!"; Transliteration: "Torappu Kisu!" (Japanese: トラップ・キス！)	Makoto Fuchigami	Yuki Enatsu	January 15, 2005
3	"How Far Will You Go, Super Sae?"; Transliteration: "Koko made Yaru!? Sūpā Sae" (Japanese: ここまでやる!? スーパーさえ)	Toshihiro Ishikawa	Miho Maruo	January 22, 2005
4	"The Catastrophe"; Transliteration: "Kiyoku Tadashii Hakyō Sengen" (Japanese: 清く正しい破局宣言)	Masami Furukawa	Natsuko Takahashi	January 29, 2005
5	"The Swim Meet From Hell"; Transliteration: "Shakunetsu Dotō no Suiei Taikai" (Japanese: 灼熱怒涛の水泳大会)	Hiromichi Matano	Reiko Yoshida	February 5, 2005
6	"Sudden Death At Love"; Transliteration: "Gekitotsu! Koi no Sadon Desu" (Japanese: 激突！恋のサドンデス)	Kazuyoshi Yokota	Hiroko Tokita	February 12, 2005
7	"A Brief Love Sign"; Transliteration: "Tsukanoma no Love Sain" (Japanese: つかのまのLOVEサイン)	Makoto Fuchigami	Miho Maruo	February 19, 2005
Sae has successfully expelled Momo from the rest of the class and separate her from Toji, even arranging for Momo's swimsuit to be sabotaged so she could not use good performances in the swim festival. The attention of the hunky fashion model Jigoro gives Sae a fresh chance to renew her former status in class. When Jigoro's attention proves unsatisfied, Sae orders him to become involved in her winning Toji away from Momo.
8	"Fame Isn't Enough"; Transliteration: "Burakku Gāru" (Japanese: ブラックガール)	Toshihiro Ishikawa	Yuki Enatsu	February 26, 2005
9	"The Destruction of Pure Love"; Transliteration: "Jun'ai Hakai Kōsaku" (Japanese: 純愛破壊工作)	Shigeharu Takahashi	Natsuko Takahashi	March 5, 2005
10	"Peach Crisis"; Transliteration: "Pīchi Kuraishisu" (Japanese: ピーチクライシス)	Mitsuo Kusakabe	Reiko Yoshida	March 12, 2005
11	"An Unbearable Breakup"; Transliteration: "Setsuna Sugiru Wakare" (Japanese: 切なすぎる別れ)	Hiromichi Matano	Hiroko Tokita	March 19, 2005
12	"The Peach Flower Bloomed?"; Transliteration: "Momo no Hana, Saita?" (Japanese: ももの花、咲いた？)	Kazuyoshi Yokota	Miho Maruo	March 26, 2005
13	"Shock! An Ex-Girlfriend Barges In!"; Transliteration: "Shōgeki! Moto Kano Ran'nyū!?" (Japanese: 衝撃！元カノ乱入!?)	Makoto Fuchigami	Yuki Enatsu	April 2, 2005
14	"The Man Who Creates a Storm"; Transliteration: "Arashi o Yobu Otoko" (Japanese: 嵐を呼ぶ男)	Toshihiro Ishikawa	Yuki Enatsu	April 9, 2005
15	"Who Will It Be?"; Transliteration: "Honmei wa Dare?" (Japanese: 本命は誰？)	Shigeharu Takahashi	Miho Maruo	April 16, 2005
16	"When Love Hits Rock Bottom"; Transliteration: "Don Soko no Koi no Yukue" (Japanese: どん底の恋の行方)	Mitsuo Kusakabe	Reiko Yoshida	April 23, 2005
17	"Direct Line to Pure Love!"; Transliteration: "Jun'ai Icchokusen!" (Japanese: 純愛一直線！)	Hiromichi Matano	Hiroko Tokita	April 30, 2005
18	"A Summer Seduction"; Transliteration: "Manatsu no Yūwaku" (Japanese: 真夏の誘惑)	Kazuyoshi Yokota	Natsuko Takahashi	May 7, 2005
19	"The Puzzle of Feelings"; Transliteration: "Kimochi no Pazuru" (Japanese: キモチのパズル)	Tōru Ishida	Yuki Enatsu	May 14, 2005
20	"One Stormy Night"; Transliteration: "Arashi no Ichiya" (Japanese: 嵐の一夜)	Toshihiro Ishikawa	Hiroko Tokita	May 21, 2005
21	"Continuous Love Storm Warnings!"; Transliteration: "Koi no Sainen Chūihō" (Japanese: 恋の再燃注意報)	Shigeharu Takahashi	Miho Maruo	May 28, 2005
22	"Imaginary Love Affair"; Transliteration: "Nōnai Ren'ai" (Japanese: 脳内恋愛)	Akira Shimizu	Miho Maruo	June 4, 2005
23	"Forced to Choose"; Transliteration: "Tsukitsukerareta Sentaku" (Japanese: 突きつけられた選択)	Hiromichi Matano	Hiroko Tokita	June 11, 2005
24	"The Truth About Goodbye"; Transliteration: "Sayonara no Shinjitsu" (Japanese: サヨナラの真実)	Kazuyoshi Yokota	Yuki Enatsu	June 18, 2005
25	"Last Hurricane!"; Transliteration: "Rasuto Harikēn!" (Japanese: ラスト・ハリケーン！)	Hiroshi Ishiodori	Reiko Yoshida	June 25, 2005

=== Film ===
A live action film of the same name directed by Koji Shintoki was released on 20 May 2017. It stars Mizuki Yamamoto as Momo Adachi and Kei Inoo as Kairi Okayasu. Other cast members are Mackenyu as Toji, Mei Nagano as Sae Kashiwagi, Yuika Motokariya as Misao Aki, Kensei Mikami as Ryo Okayasu, and Daisuke Kikuta as Jigoro. Its main theme song is "Call Me Maybe" by Carly Rae Jepsen.

=== Other adaptations ===
Peach Girl received a 13-episode Taiwanese drama in November 2002, starring Annie Wu, Vanness Wu of F4 and Kenji Wu. The setting was changed from high school to college. It was produced by Comic Ritz International Production and Chai Zhi Ping) as producer and was broadcast in Taiwan on free-to-air CTS. The opening theme song is "Love is You" (愛的就是你) by Wang Leehom and the ending song is "I Believe in Your Love" (我依然相信你還愛我) by Ginny Liu. The insert song "Who Do You Love If Not Me?" (你不愛我愛誰?) by Vanness Wu is also featured in the show.

== Reception ==
The manga has sold over 13 million copies. In 1999, Peach Girl won the Kodansha Manga Award for shōjo.
