= Nicola (magazine) =

Japanese fashion magazine

- Categories: Fashion
- Frequency: Monthly
- Circulation: 231,000
- Publisher: Shinchosha
- First issue: July 1, 1997
- Country: Japan
- Based in: Tokyo
- Language: Japanese
- Website: nicola.jp

Nicola (ニコラ, Nikora; stylized in all lowercase letters) is a fashion magazine published in Japan by Shinchosha. This magazine targets young girls ranging from early- to mid-teens. The magazine is known for its models (called Nicomo). Nicola was first published in 1997 and covers teen fashion trends, hair and make-up, and lifestyles. With the growing popularity of teen fashion and its models, Nicola became the top-selling fashion magazine targeting early- and mid- teen girls, with a circulation of over 231,000 a month.

== Nicomos ==
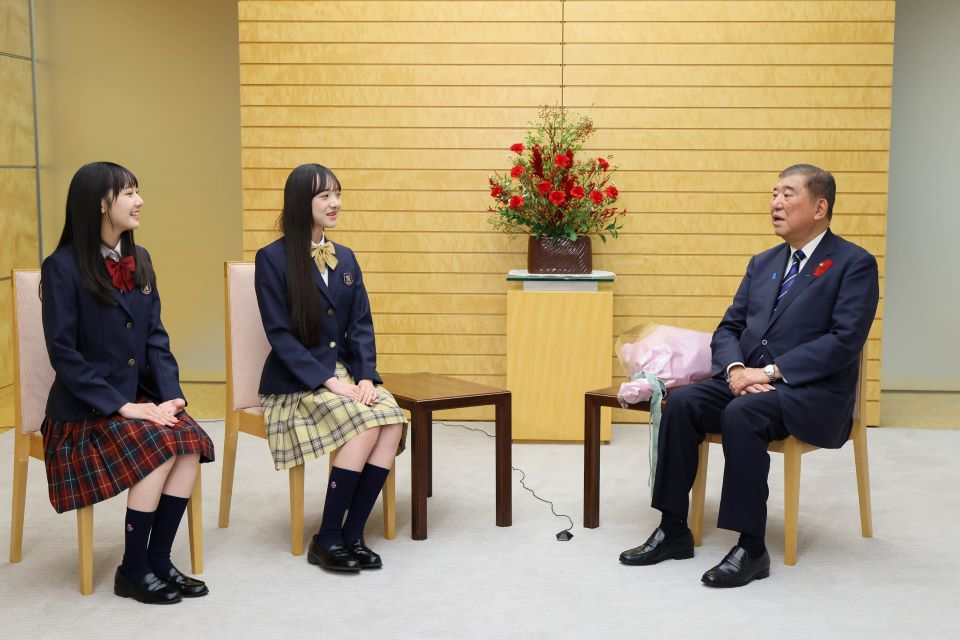
Japanese Prime Minister Shigeru Ishiba interviewed by "Nicomos" of Nicola, October 2025

Models of this magazine are called "Nicomo", a portmanteau of Nicola and model. They are all junior high or high school girls, ranging from 12 to 16 years old. They are mostly chosen in an audition held every autumn. This audition draws thousands of young girls from all over Japan every year. Nicomos are supposed to leave the magazine before they enter second grade of high school. A graduation ceremony is held for them in Tokyo every March.

== Price ==
The cover price was 450 yen when it was launched in 1997. The price was lowered to 390 yen in 1999, and then raised to 420 yen in 2006. After a series of price revisions, it is sold for 480 yen now.

== Nico-petit ==
In 2006, the magazine introduced a version targeted at elementary school students called Nico-Petit (ニコ★プチ, Nikopuchi). It started out as a quarterly magazine and then became a bimonthly in 2009.

== See also ==
- Pichi Lemon
- Love Berry
