= Liar Game (disambiguation) =

Liar Game is a Japanese manga originally written and illustrated by Shinobu Kaitani.

Liar Game may also refer to:

- Liar Game (2007 TV series), a 2007 Japanese television series
- Liar Game (2014 TV series), a 2014 South Korean television series
