= Kazuma Suzuki =

Japanese actor (born 1968)

- Born: September 10, 1968 (age 58); Mishima, Shizuoka, Japan
- Occupations: Actor, Director
- Years active: 1987–present
- Spouse: Married (2010)

Kazuma Suzuki (鈴木 一真) is a Japanese stage, film, television actor, film director, fashion designer, and former model.

== Career ==
During his high school years, Suzuki was scouted at Harajuku and made his debut as a model in the fashion magazine POPEYE. From there he made appearances in other popular Japanese magazines such as MEN'S NON-NO and MEN'S CLUB. At one point, he wanted to become a wardrobe stylist and supported famous stylists such as Tomoki Sukezane and Yoshiyuki Kitao.

In the early 1990s, Suzuki moved to Paris and became the first Japanese male model to participate in the Benetton Group's World Campaign, and on this occasion, signed with agencies in Paris, Milan, London, and New York. Suzuki has worked with L'Uomo Vogue, Harper's Bazaar Uomo (Italy), i-D (UK), Giorgio Armani, Romeo Gigli, Emilio Cavallini (Milan Fashion Week), Hedi Slimane (Paris Fashion Week), and other major magazines and designers. Suzuki has posed for the cover of over 100 magazines to date.

By the late 1990s Suzuki quit his career as a model and made his debut as an actor in Gerende ga Tokeruhodo Koishitai. In 1998 he was chosen as the heroine's lover in the nationally renowned NHK asadora morning drama series Ten Urara which widely spread Suzuki's name as an actor all over Japan.

== Filmography ==
=== Film ===
- Gerende ga Tokeruhodo Koishitai (1995), Shuusuke Kawabata
- 12 (1996)
- EYES OF THE WOLF (1997)
- Fukigen na Kajitsu (1997)
- An Obsession (1997), Shimano
- Detective RIKO (1998)
- Orokamono (1998), Masui Katsu
- heat after dark (1999)
- Ojuken (1999)
- Crazy Lips (2000), Michio Kurahashi
- Tokyo Trash Baby (2000), yoshinori
- Tales of the Unusual (2000), Yuki Takuro
- Tokyo Zansu (2001), The Promise
- DOUBLES (2001), Gun
- travailler (2002)
- Hitsuji no Uta (2002)
- Asama-Sanso Jiken (2002)
- YMCA Baseball Team (2003)
- Love! (2003)
- Mana ni Dakarete (2003)
- Robocon (2003)
- KENENN (2003)
- NO NAME
- KOIBONE (2004), Teacher Tanaka
- Black Kiss (2005)
- If You’re Happy and You Know It (2005)
- Shisso (2005)
- Sannenn Migomoru (2005)
- NANA (2005), Seiichi Mizukoshi
- Back Dancers! (2006), Seiji
- The Angel’s Egg (2006), Hasegawa
- Yoyogi Blues (2006)
- KABAN (2007)
- The Taste of Fish (2008)
- Detroit Metal City (2008), Hidetaka Asato
- Tenshi no ita Okujo (2008)
- Shisei (2009)
- Tale of Ururu’s Forest (2009)
- BANDAGE (2010), Toda
- Kotoba no nai Fuyu (2010)
- Liar Game: The Final Stage (2010), Norihiko Yokoya
- NECK (2010), Sohei Yamamoto
- Renai Gikyoku (2010)
- Liar Game: Reborn (2012), Norihiko Yokoya
- Good Luck (2012)
- Toshokan Sensō (2013)

=== Television ===
- Help (1995)
- Tokyo Angel (1996)
- Tokyo 23ku no Onna (1996)
- Natural (1996)
- Itoshi no Mirai-chan (1997)
- Saigo no Koi (1997)
- Koi, shita (1997)
- Tales of the Unusual: Nozomi to West (1997)
- Ten Urara (1998)
- Joi (1999)
- Organ no Iede (1999)
- Aoi Tokugawa Sandai (2000), Kobayakawa Hideaki
- Imagine (2000)
- Kaigo Business (2001)
- Mukashi no Otoko (2001)
- Ikirutameno Jonetsutoshiteno Satsujin (2001)
- Ainante Iraneyo, Natsu (2002)
- Nagoya Butsudan Monogatari (2002)
- Yuukaza Cinema Tatamiya (2002)
- Sky High (2003)
- Ai no Ie (2003)
- Part-Time Detective 2 (2004) as Shuzo Fujie (藤江修造)
- Jikuu Keisatsu (2004)
- The Man Who Fought the Forty-Seven Ronin (2004)
- Millionaire Detective (2005)
- Onyado Kawasemi The 3rd Chapter (2005)
- Umizaru (2005)
- Kiken na Aneki (2005)
- Izumono Okuni (2006)
- Tokyo Wonder Tours (2006)
- Millionaire Detective Deluxe (2006)
- 37C (2006)
- Sono Otoko Fukushocho (2007)
- Liar Game (2007)
- Shigotono Satamo Yomeshidai (2007)
- Tantei Gakuen Q (2007)
- Koino Karasawagi IV (2007)
- Rokumeikan (2008)
- Genjuuro Hissatsuken (2008)
- Top Sales (2008)
- Kenkaku Shoubai Haru no Arashi (2008)
- Sono Otoko Fukushocho 2 (2008)
- Reset (2009)
- Tokumei Kakaricho Tadano Hitoshi (2009)
- Kaidoku (2009)
- Mr. Brain (2009)
- Buzzer Beat (2009)
- History Thriller Theatre SP (2009)
- Nanpei Sousahan 7nin no Keiji (2009)
- Ninkyo Helper (2009)
- Liar Game: Season 2 (2010)
- Very Sweet ~C’est tres doux~
- Trick (2010)
- Omiyasan 7 (2010)
- Keiji Narusawa Ryo ~Tokyo Terrorist~ (2010)
- Eri no the Edge (2010)
- Hammer Session! (2010)
- Nanpei Sousahan 7nin no Keiji 2 (2010)
- Forensics Crime Files 31 (2010)
- Saikyo Bushoden ~Sangoku Engi~ (2010)
- Shukujo (2010)
- Bengoshi Ichinose Ritsuko (2010)
- Genya (2011)
- Nanpei Sousahan 7nin no Keiji 3 (2011)
- Absolute Zero: Undercover Op (2011)
- Keiji Yoshinaga Seiichi 8 (2011)
- Mito Kōmon (2011)
- Hokkaido Keisatsu: Junsa no Kyujitsu (2011)
- Nanpei Sousahan 7nin no Keiji 4 (2011)
- Kaitō Royal (2011)
- Ekkyo Sousa (2011)
- Mouso Sousa (2012)
- Saiko no Jinsei (2012)
- Kasoken no Onna (2012)
- Kazoku Hakkei (2012)
- Liar Game: Fukunaga VS Yokoya (2012)
- Tales of the Unusual 2012 Spring Special (2012)
- Uso no Shomei ~Kajiwara Keiko~ (2012)
- LEGAL HIGH (2012)
- Kagi no Kakatta Heya (2012)
- Nanpei Sousahan 7nin no Keiji 5 (2012)
- Tokkan (2012)
- Usono Shomei 2 ~Kajiwara Keiko~ (2013)
- Wasurenaide Yumewo ~Yanase Takashi~ (2013)
- Onna Nobunaga (2013)
- Nanpei Sousahan 7nin no Keiji 6 (2013)
- Sennyu Tantei Tokage (2013)
- Hokkaido Keisatsu: Warau Keikan (2013)
- 1st Proposal (2013)
- Akuryo Byoto (2013)
- Usono Shomei 3 ~Kajiwara Keiko~ (2013)
- Olympic Ransom (2013)
- Detective Yuri Rintaro (2020), Kyozo Tsuchiya
- Scandal Eve (2025), Hideto Aso

== Stage ==
- LOVE LETTERS (1998)
- The Tempest (2000)
- Wuthering Heights (2002)
- LOVE LETTERS (2002)
- The Fastest Clock in the Universe (2003)
- Roningai (2003)
- Densha Otoko (2005)
- Nishiki Goi (2006)
- Aoki-san’s Wife (2007)
- KEAN (2008)
- Pride (2010)
- Édith Piaf (2011)
- Ikedaya (2012)

== Awards and nominations ==
Year	Organization	Award	Work	Result
1989	SOS Model Agency	Newcomer Award		
1999	8th Japanese Professional Movie Awards	Best Supporting Actor	Orokamono	Won
1999	Employer's Association of Japan Automobile Manufacturers Association, Inc.	Motorcycle Friendship Award		
