= Liar Game: Season 2 =

Japanese television series

- ライアーゲーム シーズン2
- Genre: Drama, psychological
- Based on: Liar Game by Shinobu Kaitani
- Directed by: Hiroaki Matsuyama
- Starring: Erika Toda; Shota Matsuda
- Music by: Yasutaka Nakata
- Country of origin: Japan
- Original language: Japanese
- No. of episodes: 9

Production
- Producer: Shimuta Toru
- Production location: Japan
- Production company: Fuji Television

Original release
- Network: FNS (Fuji TV)
- Release: 10 November 2009 – 19 January 2010

Related
- Liar Game; Liar Game: The Final Stage

Liar Game: Season 2 (ライアーゲーム シーズン2) is the second season of the Japanese television drama series Liar Game, adapted from a manga of the same name. In April 2009, a second season of the drama adaptation and a live action movie were announced. The second season began airing in November 2009 and concluded on January 19, 2010. A movie sequel, Liar Game: The Final Stage, debuted on March 6, 2010.

== Cast ==
=== Players ===
Cast	Role	Description
Erika Toda	Kanzaki Nao (18)	Honest + Naive College Student
Shota Matsuda	Akiyama Shinichi (26)	"Genius Swindler"; Ex-convict for bankrupting MLM Company
Soichiro Kitamura	Fujisawa Kazuo	Nao's former teacher (now retired)
Kosuke Suzuki	Fukunaga Yuji	A flamboyant beautician involved in the Liar Game
Rinko Kikuchi	Katsuragi Ryo	A psychology professor who was classmates with Akiyama Shinichi

=== Liar Game Tournament ===
Cast	Role	Description
Shigeo Kiyama	Solario (voice)	Liar Game main dealer
Ryoko Yuui	Dealer	
Michiko Kichise	Eri	Liar Game coordinator
Ikkei Watanabe	Tanimura Mitsuo	Cop with gold front tooth in Kanzaki Nao's city

== Plot ==
Two years after the events from the previous season, the naive Kanzaki Nao (Erika Toda) and "genius swindler", Akiyama Shinichi (Shota Matsuda), go back to their normal lives until they receive an invitation to resume the Liar Game and compete for entrance to The Final Stage. Besides Kanzaki and Akiyama, the flamboyant Fukunaga (Suzuki Kosuke) returns to the Liar Game and a mysterious but talented psychology professor, Katsuragi Ryo, (Rinko Kikuchi) enters the Liar Game as Akiyama and Kanzaki's new opponent.

== Episodes ==
No.	Title	Original release date
1	TBA	November 10, 2009
Two years have passed since Round 3 of the Liar Game. Nao Kanzaki has returned to her normal life, now with the new friends she made from the Game, and Shinichi Akiyama has gone overseas. However, the Liar Game has yet to end, as the two encounter letters detailing Round 4's location and rules: a 3v3 battle between the "Kingdom of Sun" and the "Kingdom of Moon" in an abandoned old arcade. Nao is convinced to re-enter the game by Tanimura, who says that only her pure nature can save the other players, and Akiyama returns to find out more about the truth behind the Game. Joining their team is former archenemy Yuji Fukunaga, and they have to work together as vanguard, main body and general in individual games to earn more chips than the other team, with every player having 150 chips each amounting to 1 million yen. The first vanguard battle, with Fukunaga against a Yuichi Nishida, is 24-round russian roulette with the sound of bullets simulating "death", and the loser has to pay the winner 50 million yen. Meanwhile, an ominous player and former psychology classmate of Akiyama's — now a professional university lecturer — by the name of Ryō Katsuragi arrives to participate in Round 4 in a different venue.
2	TBA	November 17, 2009
3	TBA	November 24, 2009
4	TBA	TBA
5	TBA	TBA
6	TBA	TBA
7	TBA	TBA
8	TBA	TBA
9	TBA	TBA

== Reception ==
=== Awards and nominations ===
- 13th Nikkan Sports Drama Grand Prix (Fall 2009): Best Actress - Toda Erika
