= Rio Yamashita =

Japanese actress and fashion model (born 1992)

- 山下 リオ
- Born: October 10, 1992 (age 33); Tokushima, Japan
- Other names: Rio-chan (リオちゃん)
- Occupations: Model, actress
- Years active: 2006–present
- Agent: Contents Three
- Height: 1.65 m (5 ft 5 in)
- Relatives: Chihiro Otsuka (older sister); Kosuke Suzuki (brother-in-law)
- Awards: Bessatsu Margaret Be-Ma Girls Grand Prix

Rio Yamashita (山下 リオ, Yamashita Rio; born 10 October 1992, in Tokushima, Tokushima, Japan) is a Japanese actress and fashion model.

Yamashita is represented with Contents Three.

== Biography ==
Yamashita decided to pursue a career as an actress when she watched Ko Shibasaki in the television drama Orange Days when she was in elementary school. She later auditioned for Stardust Promotion, which Shibasaki is affiliated with, in 2006.

In March 2007 she was chosen as the 12th Rehouse Girl of Mitsui Fudosan Realty. Later in April Yamashita became an exclusive model for the fashion magazine Hanachu. Her acting debut was in the drama Koisuru Nichiyōbi: Dai 3 Series in June.

In November 2008 Yamashita's first leading role in a terrestrial television drama was the Ai no Gekijō 40th anniversary programme Love Letter.

Her first leading role in a film was Someday's Dreamers later in December.

In July 2013, Yamashita played Arisa Morishige in the drama Limit whose character is bullied and runs away in extreme conditions.

Her first regular variety appearances was as an assistant on the television series A-Studio in April 2014.

On August 31, 2022, she left Stardust Promotion after 16 years and become freelance actress. However, on January 1, 2025, she joined Contents Three.

== Filmography ==
=== TV series ===
| Year | Title | Role | Notes | Ref. |
|---|---|---|---|---|
| 2008 | Love Letter | Minami Tadokoro (teenager) | Lead role | |
| 2013 | Amachan | Ayumi Miyashita | Weeks 13 to 23; Asadora | |
| 2013 | Limit | Arisa Morishige | | |
| 2013 | Higanjima | Yuki | | |
| 2013 | D-Next: Nagareboshi | Shiori Yamada | Lead role | |
| 2022–25 | Gannibal | Kanako Yamaguchi | 2 seasons | |

=== Films ===
| Year | Title | Role | Notes | Ref. |
|---|---|---|---|---|
| 2008 | Someday's Dreamers | Sora Suzuki | Lead role | |
| 2011 | Hormone Onna | Hiroko Sakai | Lead role | |
| 2018 | Asako I & II | Maya | | |
| 2020 | True Mothers | | | |
| 2021 | Aristocrats | | | |
| 2021 | Ribbon | | | |
| 2022 | Motherhood | | | |
| 2023 | Downfall | Nao Tomita | | |
| 2024 | Penalty Loop | Yui Sunahara | | |
| 2024 | Play! | Momoko Mikami | | |
| 2025 | Yukiko a.k.a | Yukiko Yoshimura | Lead role | |
| 2026 | Iai | Kana Fujii | Lead role | |
| 2026 | Transit in Flamingo | Sae | Lead role | |

=== Stage ===
| Year | Title | Role | Notes | Ref. |
|---|---|---|---|---|
| 2014 | Phantom | Christine Daae | | |

== Bibliography ==
=== Photo albums ===
| Year | Title |
|---|---|
| 2007 | Coming Soon... Ī hi ni kitto, tsuzui teru. |

=== Magazines ===
| Year | Title | Notes |
|---|---|---|
| 2006 | Love Berry | |
| 2007 | Hanachu | Exclusive model |
| | Cutie | |

=== Books ===
| Title | Notes |
|---|---|
| Kokoro | Cover; opening gravure model |
| Beautiful Lady & Television U-17 | Sizzleful Girl; Volumes 2, 8, 10, 12 |
