= Shota Matsuda =

Japanese actor (born 1985)

- 松田 翔太
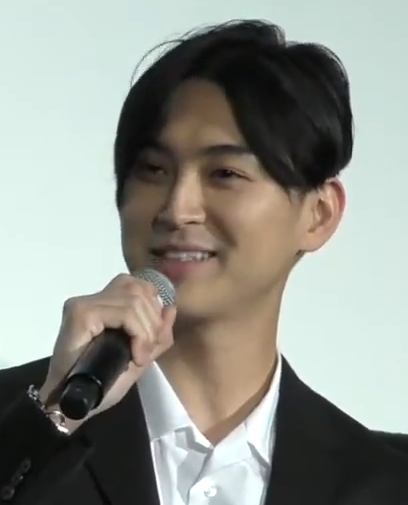
- Matsuda at a press event for Tokyo Ghoul S in 2019
- Born: September 10, 1985 (age 40); Suginami, Tokyo, Japan
- Occupation: Actor
- Years active: 2005—present
- Spouse: Kozue Akimoto (m. 2018)
- Parent(s): Yūsaku Matsuda (father); Miyuki Matsuda (mother)
- Relatives: Ryuhei Matsuda (older brother); Yuuki Matsuda (younger sister); Mala Morgan (sister-in-law)
- Website: office-saku.com

Shota Matsuda (松田 翔太, Matsuda Shōta; born September 10, 1985) is a Japanese actor. Matsuda is best known for his roles in the Hana Yori Dango series, the Liar Game series, and Love Shuffle.

== Personal life ==
Matsuda was born on September 10, 1985 in Suginami, Tokyo, Japan, to Yūsaku Matsuda, a Japanese actor of partial Korean ancestry, and Miyuki Matsuda (née Kumagai). Matsuda was the second son and second child born of his parents' marriage. He has an older brother, Ryuhei Matsuda, who is also an actor, and a younger sister, Yuuki Matsuda, who is a singer, and one older half-sister by his father's first marriage. His father died in 1989 from bladder cancer, when Matsuda was four years old. Matsuda's maternal aunt, Mami Kumagai, is also an actress.

Matsuda directed Radio Foundation's music video "Brain Washing" as a tribute to their lead vocalist, Kenma Miyaoku, who died from a heart attack on July 12, 2009.

=== Marriage ===
On April 25, 2018, after dating for a few years, Matsuda and model Kozue Akimoto jointly announced through their respective agencies that they had registered their marriage.

== Filmography ==
=== Drama ===
Year	English title	Channel	Japanese title	Role	Note
2003	Drop-out Teacher Returns to School	TBS	Yankee Bokou ni Kaeru	Noriyuki Takahashi	
2005	Boys Over Flowers	TBS	Hana Yori Dango	Nishikado Sojiro	
2006	Regatta	TV Asahi	レガッタ 君といた永遠	Seiya Yagi	
2006	Top Caster	Fuji TV	トップキャスター	Shunpei Iga	
2007	The Empress Of Ginza	TV Asahi	Jyotei	Date Naoto	
2007	Liar Game	Fuji TV	ライアーゲーム	Akiyama Shinichi	Co-star
2007	Boys Over Flowers Returns	TBS	Hana Yori Dango Returns	Nishikado Sojiro	
2008	Flower Shop Without Rose	Fuji TV	Bara no nai Hanaya	Naoya Kudo	
2008	Princess Atsu	NHK	Atsuhime	Tokugawa Iemochi	Taiga drama
2009	Lessons for a Perfect Detective Story	TV Asahi	Meitantei no Okite	Daigoro Tenkaichi	Lead role
2009	Love Shuffle	TBS	ラブシャッフル	Ojiro Sera	
2009	Liar Game: Season 2	Fuji TV	ライアーゲーム ～シーズン2	Shinichi Akiyama	Co-star
2010	Moon Lovers	Fuji TV	Tsuki no Koibito	Kazami Sai	
2010	Nagareboshi	Fuji TV	流れ星	Ryo Kamiya	
2011	Don Quixote	NTV	ドン★キホーテ	Masataka Shirota	Lead role
2012	Taira no Kiyomori	NHK	平清盛	Emperor Go-Shirakawa	Taiga drama
2013	Undercover Agent Lizard	TBS	Sennyu Tantei Tokage	Oribe Toru	Lead role
2014	Clinic on the Sea	Fuji TV	Umi no Ue no Shinryoujo	Sezaki Kota	Lead role
2016	Dias Police: Ihou Keisatsu	TBS	ディアスポリス-異邦警察	Saki Kubozuka	Lead role
2017	Final Life: Even if You Die Tomorrow	Amazon Prime	ファイナルライフ－明日、君が消えても－	Ryo Kawakubo	Lead role
2018	Segodon	NHK	西郷どん	Tokugawa Yoshinobu	Taiga drama
2018	Boys Over Flowers Season 2	TBS	花のち晴れ〜花男 Next Season〜	Nishikado Sojiro	Cameo
2023	The Truth	TV Tokyo	THE TRUTH		Lead role

=== TV Film ===
Year	Title	Channel	Role	Note
2006	Poem of Love	TBS	Takumi Nanase	
2008	Rokumeikan	TV Asahi	Hisao Kiyohara	
2014	Miyamoto Musashi SP	TV Asahi	Seijuro Yoshioka	
2015	Koko ni Aru Shiawase	NHK	Hiroyuki Tachikawa	Lead role

=== Film ===
Year	Title	Role	Note
2006	A Cheerful Gang turns the Earth	Koun	
2006	A Long Walk	Wataru	
2007	Waruboro	Ko-chan	Lead role
2008	Ikigami: The Ultimate Limit	Kengo Fujimoto	Lead role
2008	Hana Yori Dango Final	Nishikado Sojiro	
2010	A Crowd of Three	Kenta	Lead role
2010	Liar Game: The Final Stage	Shinichi Akiyama	Co-star
2011	Hard Romantic-er	Gu	Lead role
2011	Smuggler	Sumagura / police officer	Lead role
2012	Afro Tanaka	Hiroshi Tanaka	Lead role
2012	Liar Game: Reborn	Shinichi Akiyama	Co-star
2013	1905	Tamotsu Kato	Production cancelled February 2013
2014	Sweet Poolside	Mitsuhiko Ota (Toshihiko's older brother)	
2015	Initiation Love	Suzuki	Lead role
2016	Over the Fence	Kazuhisa	
2016	Dias Police: Dirty Yellow Boys	Saki Kubozuka	Lead role
2018	Isle of Dogs	Junior Scientist #3	Voice; American-German film
2019	Tokyo Ghoul S	Shū Tsukiyama	
2020	Not Quite Dead Yet		
2020	Nozomi	Naitō	

=== Video games ===
Year	Title	Role	Publisher	Ref.
2008	Ryū ga Gotoku Kenzan!	Sasaki Kojirō	Sega	

== Awards ==
Year	Nominee / work	Award	Result
2008	Ikigami	Nikkan Sports Film Awards: Yujiro Ishihara New Actor Award	Won
2008	Waruboro	Mainichi Film Awards: Sponichi Grand Prize New Talent Award	Won
2009	Ikigami	32nd Japan Academy Prize: Newcomer of the Year	Won
2009	Hana Yori Dango Final	Asian Film Awards: Best Newcomer	Nominated
