= Motherhood (2022 Japanese film) =

2022 Japanese psychological thriller drama film directed by Ryuichi Hiroki

- Theatrical release poster
- Directed by: Ryūichi Hiroki
- Written by: Anne Horiizumi
- Based on: "Bosei (母性)" by Kanae Minato
- Produced by: Shunsuke Koga; Yasushi Minatoya
- Starring: Mei Nagano; Erika Toda; Atsuko Takahata
- Cinematography: Atsuhiro Nabeshima
- Edited by: Minoru Nomoto
- Distributed by: Warner Bros. Pictures
- Release date: October 27, 2022
- Running time: 116 minutes
- Country: Japan
- Language: Japanese

Motherhood is a 2022 Japanese psychological thriller drama film directed by Ryūichi Hiroki. The film stars Erika Toda and Mei Nagano in the main lead roles. The storyline of the film is an adaptation from Japanese crime fiction writer Kanae Minato's bestseller novel Bosei (母性). The film depicts about the paramount importance on the main theme of the plot revolving around motherhood by delving into the stories of three generations of women in Japan with an influence of Confucianism. The film opened to positive reviews from critics, with Atsuhiro Nabeshima's cinematography being praised for the portrayal of picturesque set design and coloring throughout the film.

== Cast ==
- Mei Nagano as Sayaka
- Erika Toda as Rumiko
- Atsuko Takahata as Rumiko's mother-in-law and Sayaka's grandmother
- Mao Daichi as Rumiko's mother
- Masaki Miura
- Yuri Nakamura
- Rio Yamashita

== Synopsis ==
On one fine day, Sayaka (Mei Nagano), a female high school student, decides to take her own life and ends up committing suicide. However, the rationale regarding what exactly could have prompted her to act in such an extreme manner remains unanswered, and the reason for her suicide is not yet identified, as the clues to find out about her death are untraceable as well. A suicide note is also not found, and the lack of clarity to understand the thought process surrounding the whole fiasco on Sayaka's death culminates in the incident being labelled as a shoddy, mysterious matter. Many people who knew about Sayaka in her social circles insisted that she had a routine, normal life with her family, including her mother, Rumiko (Erika Toda). Rumiko seemed like a genuine single mother who took care of her daughter Sayaka with love and affection.

Interestingly, things take a swift turn when flashbacks of Sayaka and Rumiko's life trajectories trigger a critical juncture (the tip of the iceberg scenario) to understand the bigger picture of how things had been panned out in a typical Japanese traditional family, which gives too much emphasis to power dynamics on how the women should act accordingly even if the odds are not in favor of them. Eventually complacency occupies when things go out of control, leading Sayaka to a sense of grief and despair, losing all her hopes to revive the bond within the family. In reality, things looked bleak as Sayaka understood that she had been on the receiving end whenever she attempted to defend and support her mother Rumiko, after realizing Rumiko's mother-in-law (Sayaka's grandmother) had the habit of torturing and bashing Rumiko and treating Rumiko unfairly to showcase her influence and authority as the head of the house. Rumiko, instead of supporting her daughter Sayaka, criticizes Sayaka for standing up against her mother-in-law, and Rumiko gives advice to Sayaka to give respect to the elders without deviating from the basic family traditions. Rumiko, instead of teaching the self-defense strategies to her daughter, asks her to comply with the cultural norms by being patient rather than venting the frustration at senior family members. Rumiko wanted her daughter to live the life just like her, by giving a glimpse of how Rumiko herself gathered the plethora of life advices from her own mother about how to adjust and live peacefully with a family, where Rumiko would go on to live after she enters the marriage phase. The situation is further aggravated when Sayaka realizes that even her own father fails to admit about his mother's rude behavior by turning a blind eye to such situations, as Sayaka comes to the conclusion that she is left behind even by her own parents with a sense of betrayal. These sequences of events with having been brought up under the circumstances of a depressing toxic environment summed up the suicidal death of Sayaka.

== Premiere ==
The film was premiered at the 2022 Vancouver International Film Festival. In July 2023, the film had its premiere in the Standouts section at the 22nd edition of the New York Asian Film Festival. The film was also screened at the 35th Tokyo International Film Festival.

== Awards and nominations ==
Year	Award	Category	Recipient(s) and nominee(s)	Result	Ref.
2022	46th Japan Academy Film Prize	Best Supporting Actress	Mei Nagano	Nominated	
