= Crazy Lips =

2000 film

- DVD cover
- Directed by: Hirohisa Sasaki
- Written by: Hiroshi Takahashi
- Produced by: Takashige Ichise; Makoto Ishihara; Naoto Kumazawa
- Starring: Hitomi Miwa; Kazuma Suzuki; Hiroshi Abe
- Cinematography: Tokushō Kikumura
- Music by: Gary Ashiya
- Production company: Omega Project
- Release date: February 26, 2000 (Japan)
- Running time: 85 minutes
- Country: Japan
- Language: Japanese

Crazy Lips (Japanese: 発狂する唇, Hepburn: Hakkyōsuru kuchibiru) is a Japanese comedy horror film directed by Hirohisa Sasaki from 2000. It follows a young woman who, after her brother is accused of decapitating four schoolgirls, goes to a psychic in an effort to prove his innocence, only to find things spiraling out of control.

== Cast ==
- Hitomi Miwa - Satomi Kurahashi
- Kazuma Suzuki - Michio Kurahashi
- Ren Osugi - Colonel
- Hiroshi Abe - Narimoto
- Hijiri Natsukawa - Kaori Kurahashi
