= April Fools (2015 film) =

- Poster
- エイプリルフールズ
- Directed by: Junichi Ishikawa
- Screenplay by: Ryōta Kosawa
- Starring: Erika Toda; Tori Matsuzaka
- Cinematography: Hironobu Ōishi
- Edited by: Shinji Kawamura
- Music by: Yuki Hayashi
- Distributed by: Toho
- Release date: April 1, 2015 (Japan)
- Running time: 118 minutes
- Country: Japan
- Language: Japanese
- Box office: ¥306.5 million (Japan)

April Fools (Japanese: エイプリルフールズ) is a 2015 Japanese comedy drama suspense film directed by Junichi Ishikawa. It was released on April 1, 2015.

== Plot ==
In one of the subplots in this film, Ayumi Nitta (Erika Toda) suffers from anthropophobia (extreme shyness and fear of people). She works as a janitor at a hospital. She had a one-night stand with Wataru Makino (Tori Matsuzaka) who is a sex addict and a womanizer getting his way with beautiful women by lying about being a very good surgeon and many other things. Ayumi later realizes that she is pregnant because of that one night stand. When she tells Wataru that she is pregnant, Wataru believes she is a making a bad April Fools joke. Wataru Makino then takes flight attendant Reiko (Nanao) out to an Italian restaurant. He doesn't know that Ayumi Nitta is going to the same restaurant, after he mentioned it when she called him, to confront him to take responsibility for getting her pregnant which escalated to a major incident. Other subplots involve a student (Seishuu Uragami) who thinks he is an alien after reading messages he received via internet, an old lady (Lily) who is being suspected by a police detective (Masanobu Takashima) of being a con offering some kind of shaman service, a middle aged couple (Kotaro Satomi, Sumiko Fuji) pretending to be Japanese royalties to fulfill the dying wife's wish, a 'kidnapped' school student (Minami Hamabe) and her family, and two friends (Masataka Kubota, Masato Yano) who stay together one being a homosexual. All the things that happened in these subplots occurred on April 1 which could be or is mistaken to be April fools prank.

== Cast ==
- Erika Toda as Ayumi Nitta
- Tori Matsuzaka as Makino
- Yūsuke Santamaria as a receptionist
- Yukiyoshi Ozawa as a chef
- Sayaka Yamaguchi as a mother
- Masanobu Takashima as a detective Ono
- Eiko Koike as a punk woman
- Kotaro Satomi as Sakurakōji Yūmaro
- Shigeyuki Totsugi as a husband

== Reception ==
By April 5, the film had earned ¥306.494 million at the Japanese box office.
