= Chihiro Otsuka =

Japanese actress (born 1986)

- 大塚 千弘
- Born: March 12, 1986 (age 40); Tokushima, Japan
- Education: Horikoshi High School
- Occupation: Actress
- Years active: 2000–present
- Height: 162 cm (5 ft 4 in)
- Spouse: Kōsuke Suzuki (m. 2015)
- Children: 2
- Relatives: Rio Yamashita (sister)

Chihiro Otsuka (大塚 ちひろ, Ōtsuka Chihiro; born March 12, 1986) is a Japanese actress. Her birth name in kanji is 大塚 千弘, but she writes her given name in hiragana characters.

== Filmography ==
=== Movie ===
- Dark Water (2002)
- Godzilla: Tokyo S.O.S. (2003)
- Be with You (いま、会いにゆきます, Ima, ai ni yukimasu) (2004)
- Godzilla: Final Wars (2004)
- Female (2005)
- Radiance (2017)

=== Television ===
- Attention Please (Fuji TV, 2006)
- Yamada Taro Monogatari (TBS, 2007)
- Tetsudō Sōsakan (TV Asahi, 2012–2018) - as Sanae Utsumi

=== Voice Acting roles ===
- Yakitate!! Japan - Azusagawa Tsukino

=== Voice Dubbing roles ===
- Racing Stripes - Channing "Chan" Walsh (2005)
- Dumbo - Miss Atlantis (2019)
- Arlo the Alligator Boy - Bertie

=== Musical ===
- Cinderella Story - Cinderella (2003–2005)
- Mozart! - Constanze (2005), Nannerl (2024)
- Dance of the Vampires - Sarah (2005–2009), Magda (2019)
- How to Succeed in Business Without Really Trying - Rosemary Pilkington (2006–2007)
- Rebecca - I (2008–2019)
- Zorro - Luisa (2011)
- Love Letters – Melissa (2012)
- Fiddler on the Roof - Hodel (2013)
- The Beautiful Game - Mary (2014)
- In the Heights - Vanessa (2014)
- Carmen - Catalina (2014)
- The Threepenny Opera - Lucy Brown (2014)
- The Pajama Game - Gladys Hotchkiss (2017)
- Slumdog Millionaire - Smita Shah (2022)
- Matilda - Mrs. Wormwood (2023)
