= Liar Game (2014 TV series) =

2014 South Korean television series

- Promotional poster
- Genre: Mystery, Thriller
- Based on: Liar Game by Shinobu Kaitani
- Written by: Ryu Yong-jae
- Directed by: Kim Hong-sun
- Starring: Kim So-eun; Lee Sang-yoon; Shin Sung-rok
- Country of origin: South Korea
- Original language: Korean
- No. of episodes: 12

Production
- Production location: Korea
- Production companies: Apollo Pictures; Fantagio

Original release
- Network: tvN
- Release: October 20 – November 18, 2014

Liar Game (Korean: 라이어 게임) is a 2014 South Korean television series based on the Japanese manga of the same title by Shinobu Kaitani. Starring Kim So-eun, Lee Sang-yoon, and Shin Sung-rok, it aired on tvN from October 20 to November 18, 2014, on Mondays and Tuesdays at 23:00 (KST) for 12 episodes.

== Synopsis ==
Nam Da-jung (Kim So-eun) is an innocent college student who passes a hidden camera audition and is invited to join the reality show Liar Game, a psychological survival game wherein participants trick each other and the one who ultimately succeeds wins the prize money of ₩10 billion (US$9.3 million). Tempted by the chance to pay off her debts, Da-jung joins the game and gets conned out of the initial money given to her. In desperation, she asks genius ex-con swindler and former psychology professor Ha Woo-jin (Lee Sang-yoon) to help her win the game.

== Cast ==
=== Main ===
- Kim So-eun as Nam Da-jung
- Lee Sang-yoon as Ha Woo-jin
- Shin Sung-rok as Kang Do-young

=== Supporting ===
- Choi Yoon-so as Goo Ja-young
- Kim Young-ae as Woo-jin's mother
- Jo Jae-yoon as Jo Dal-gu
- Um Hyo-sup as Da-jung's father
- Kang Min-kyung as Sung-ja
- Cha Soo-yeon as Lee Yoon-joo
- Choi Jin-ho as Director Jang
- Kim Ik-tae as Hyun Jung-beom
- Lee El as Oh Jung-ah / Jamie
- Jang Seung-jo as Kim Bong-geun
- Lee Si-hoo as Choi Sung-joon
- Kim Seon-hwa as Ppippi the fortuneteller
- Lee Kyu-bok as President Bae
- Lee Jun-hyeok as Criminal (ep. 1)
- Lee Cheol-min as Bulldog
- Lee Hae-yeong as Lawyer
- Park Ho-san as detective

== Other ==
This drama is an adaptation of the original Liar Game manga, it is not a remake of the Japanese drama. This drama only has the original manga's copyright.
