= Liar Game: Reborn =

- Film poster advertising this film in Japan
- Directed by: Hiroaki Matsuyama
- Based on: Liar Game by Shinobu Kaitani
- Produced by: Chihiro Kameyama; Kazuhiko Torishima; Minami Ichikawa; Tsuguaki Tatematsu; Masahide Takahashi; Shinya Koto
- Starring: Shota Matsuda; Mikako Tabe; Mana Ashida
- Cinematography: Nobu Miyata
- Distributed by: Toho Company Ltd.
- Release date: March 3, 2012 (Japan)
- Running time: 131 minutes
- Country: Japan
- Language: Japanese

Liar Game: Reborn (ライアーゲーム -再生-, Liar Game: Saisei) is a 2012 Japanese film directed by Hiroaki Matsuyama.

== Plot ==
College graduate Shinomiya is delivered 100 million yen and an invitation to the restarted Liar Game. If she does not participate, she must return the money with an additional monetary penalty. She begs for help from her psychology professor, Akiyama (the last winner of the Liar Game) but he seems unsympathetic. Shinomiya is picked up by the organizers and transported to the location hosting the Liar Game. Former Liar Game player Fukunaga informs Akiyama of Shinomiya's plight while inviting him back to Liar Game. Akiyama thus returns to compete.

This edition of the Liar Game features a variant of musical chairs, starting with twenty players and fifteen chairs. Players (including eliminated ones) elect a representative after each round, who removes one of the numbered chairs from the game. Each player receives twenty tokens; each of the winning player's tokens is worth 100 million yen. Losing players must pay 200 million to the organizers. The players protest since they were only given 100 million with the invitation; they fear going into debt. The game is observed by Fukunaga and Tanimura.

The first round eliminates eight players. Shinomiya was tricked by Yasukawa but saved by Sakamaki; both of whom were former Liar Game players. Alliances are formed to win the elections and eliminate numbered chairs of other groups. Religious cult leader Harimoto has a team of five. Kiryu joins forces with Inuzuka and Sarukawa. Shinomiya groups with Akiyama, Sakamaki and Yasukawa, as well as eliminated players Emi and Akagi. The remaining six eliminated also form a group.

The groups of Harimoto and Kiryu work together to outnumber Akiyama's group. Yasukawa threatens to betray, so Akiyama has him eliminated; he joins Kiryu's group. Akiyama orders his group not to vote, resulting in Harimoto and Kiryu's groups turning on each other. Akiyama solicits the votes of the eliminated group, but they instead vote for Shinomiya, who Emi had urged to betray Akiyama. Shinomiya got their votes by offering her own tokens, later the other groups also do so to entice the eliminated group. Emi betrays Shinomiya; it is revealed that she is a spy for Harimoto.

With Sakamaki eliminated, Akiyama disposes of his tokens to assure other players that his team's remaining hope is Shinomiya. She gives her tokens to all players, altruistically urging them to help her win, then her tokens given to them can pay off their debts. The other players reject this plan. Kiryu taunts Shinomiya; she slaps him and is eliminated for using violence, seemingly ending the hopes of Akiyama's group.

Kiryu and Harimoto battle for the votes of the eliminated players' group with token bribes. Kiryu outmaneuvers and eliminates Harimoto by exposing that Harimoto intended his teammate Sakai to win, rendering Harimoto's given tokens useless.

The game comes down to Akiyama, Kiryu, Sakai, and Sarukawa. Sakai deceives Kiryu so that both are eliminated. Akiyama also eliminates himself, so Sarukawa is the winner. What had occurred was that Akiyama enticed Inuzuka to betray her group and hand over Sarukawa's tokens. Akiyama then bribed Inuzuka, Sakai and the eliminated players with Sarukawa's tokens - these players received the prize money instead of Sarukawa, who had none of his own tokens. Earlier, Shinomiya purposely eliminated herself so that other players would trust that Akiyama's team was genuinely aiming for a Sarukawa win.

All the players who received money decide to fully pay off their former allies' debts - thus no player profited or lost money. Fukunaga, Tanimura and the players celebrate the result. Akiyama denies that he entered the game to help Shinomiya, to which she responds that he is a poor liar.

== Cast ==
- Shota Matsuda as Shinichi Akiyama
- Mikako Tabe as Yu Shinomiya
- Mari Hamada as Mai Sakamaki (坂巻マイ, Sakamaki Mai)
- Jun Kaname as Kōta Akagi (赤城コウタ, Akagi Kōta)
- Eiko Koike as Emi Tsukino (月乃エミ, Tsukino Emi)
- Shihō Harumi as Norihiko Yasukawa (安川ノリヒコ, Yasukawa Norihiko)
- Eiichirō Funakoshi as Takashi Harimoto (ハリモトタカシ, Harimoto Takashi)
- Ako Masuki as Kay Kimura (木村ケイ, Kimura Kay)
- Natsuhi Ueno as Mika Mikamoto (三家本ミカ, Mikamoto Mika)
- Yōko Saitō as Yukiko Abe (阿部ユキコ, Abe Yukiko)
- Yōsuke Kawamura as Makoto Sakai (酒井マコト, Sakai Makoto)
- Hirofumi Arai as Nobuteru Kiryu (桐生ノブテル, Kiryu Nobuteru)
- Jōji Takahashi as Kenji Sarukawa (猿川ケンジ, Sarukawa Kenji)
- Maho Nonami as Eiko Inuzuka (犬塚エイコ, Inuzuka Eiko)
- Tetsuhiro Ikeda as Takahiro Shima (嶋タカヒロ, Shima Takahiro)
- Tadahiro Aoki as Kakeru Saiki (斉木カケル, Saiki Kakeru)
- Ken Maeda as Tetsuya Murata (村田テツヤ, Murata Tetsuya)
- Toshiro Uehara (上原敏郎, Uehara Toshiro) as Akira Tsumura (津村アキラ, Tsumura Akira)
- Takurō Ōno as Tatsushi Wada (和田タツジ, Wada Tatsushi)
- Ryo Ryusei as Osamu Shimoharada (下原田オサム, Shimoharada Osamu)
- Mana Ashida as Alice (アリス, Arisu)
- Ikkei Watanabe as Mitsuo Tanimura (谷村光男, Tanimura Mitsuo)
- Kosuke Suzuki as Fukunaga Yuji
- Kazuma Suzuki as Norihiko Yokotani (横谷ノリヒコ, Yokotani Norihiko)
- Makiko Esumi as Organizer Ω (主催者・Ω, Shusai-sha Ō)
