= Hirohisa Sasaki =

Japanese film director and screenwriter

- Born: February 17, 1961 (age 65); Hokkaidō, Japan
- Occupations: Film director, screenwriter

Hirohisa Sasaki (佐々木浩久, Sasaki Hirohisa) is a Japanese film director and screenwriter.

== Filmography ==
- Totoshi: Taagetto 1: Seifuku o Nuida Bijin Hisho (1998)
- Crazy Lips (2000)
- Gore from Outer Space (2001)
- Chi o Sū Uchū: Gaiden: Henshin (2002)
- Kaidan Shin Mimibukuro: Tokubetsuhen: Kamon (2003)
- Akuma no Keiji (Deka) Matsuri (2004)
- Gakkō no Kaidan (2007)
