= Michiko Kichise =

Japanese actress and model (born 1975)

- 吉瀬 美智子
- Born: February 17, 1975 (age 51); Asakura, Fukuoka Prefecture, Japan
- Occupations: Actress; model
- Years active: 1995–present
- Spouse: Unknown (m. 2010; div. 2021)
- Children: 2
- Website: Official website

Michiko Kichise (吉瀬 美智子, Kichise Michiko; born 17 February 1975) is a Japanese actress and model. She received the Elan d'or Award for Newcomer of the Year in 2011 for her work in Liar Game: Season 2 (2009–10), Liar Game: The Final Stage (2010), and Bloody Monday Season 2 (2010).

== Personal life ==
In December 2010, Kichise married an ordinary man ten years older than her. She gave birth to their first child, a daughter, in July 2013 and her second daughter in October 2016.

In April 2021, Kichise announced that she had divorced her husband via her agency's official website and a handwritten letter on her official Twitter.

=== Health ===
Kichise suffers from chronic sinusitis condition, and that in 2025 her symptoms has worsened, causing her to experience olfactory dysfunction.

== Filmography ==
=== Film ===
Year	Title	Role	Notes	Ref.
2010	Elevator to the Gallows	Meiko Temiyako	Lead role	
2019	The Confidence Man JP: The Movie			
2021	Signal the Movie	Misaki Sakurai		
2022	7 Secretaries: The Movie			
2023	Kyrie			
2024	Dangerous Cops: Home Coming	Stella Lee		
2024	Tomorrow in the Finder			
2025	A Moon in the Ordinary			

=== Television ===
Year	Title	Role	Notes	Ref.
2007–11	Liar Game	Eri	2 seasons	
2009	Tenchijin	Oyu	Taiga drama	
2010–11	The Woman of Steel	Ineko Haga	Lead role; 2 seasons	
2014	Hirugao	Rikako Tagigawa		
2017	Blanket Cats	Misaki Fujimura		
2017	Cecile's Plot	Yukako Hamaguchi		
2018	Signal	Misaki Sakurai		
2023	Burn the House Down	Satsuki Murata		
2024–27	Unmet: A Neurosurgeon's Diary	Reiko Tsubata	2 seasons	

== Awards ==
Year	Award	Category	Work	Result	Ref.
2011	35th Elan d'or Awards	Elan d'or Award for Newcomer of the Year	Liar Game and Bloody Monday	Won	
