= Erika Toda =

Japanese actress (born 1988)

- 戸田 恵梨香
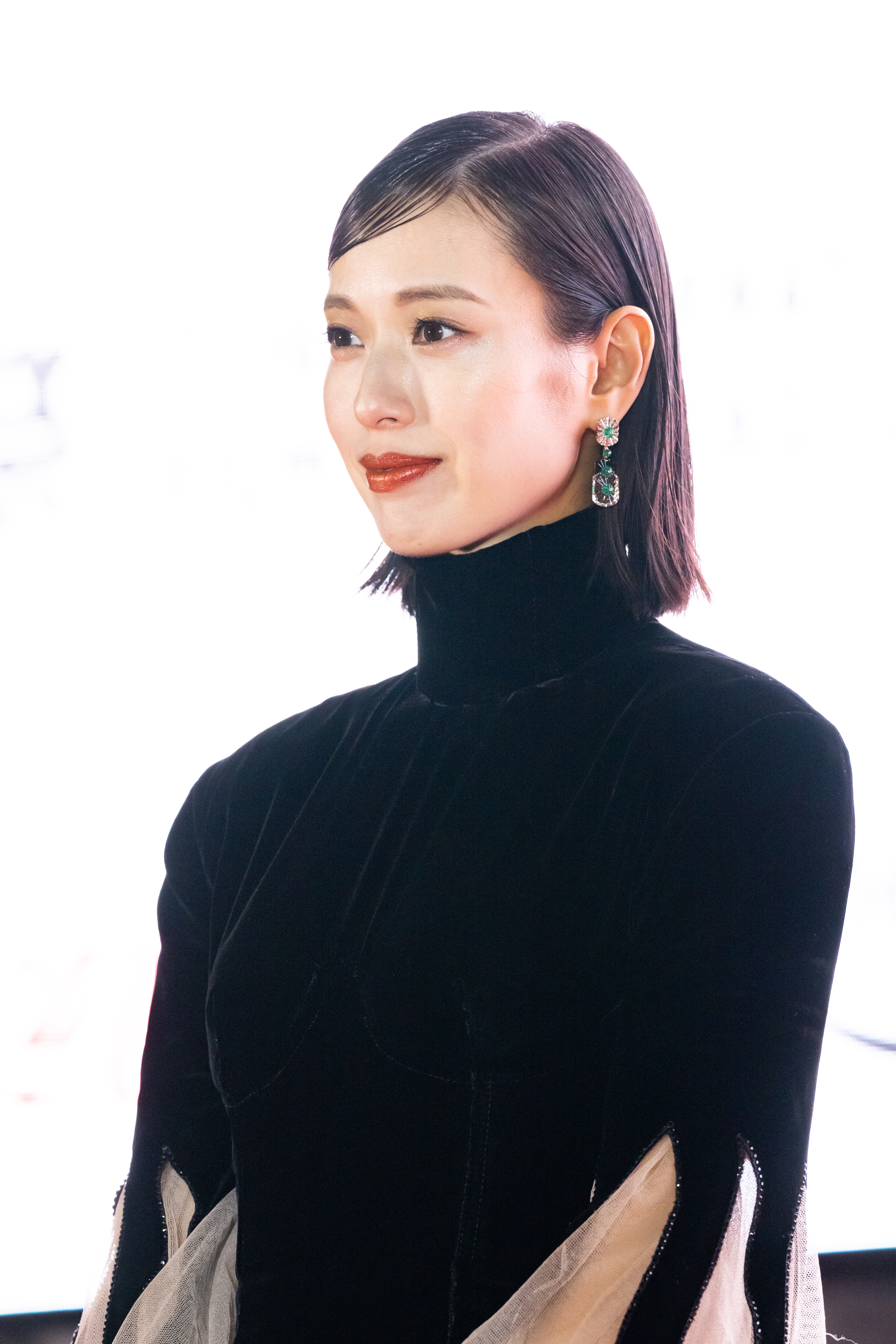
- Toda in 2022
- Born: August 17, 1988 (age 38); Nada-ku, Kobe, Hyōgo, Japan
- Occupation: Actress
- Years active: 2000–present
- Known for: Death Note; Liar Game
- Spouse: Tori Matsuzaka (m. 2020)
- Children: 1
- Website: flamme.co.jp/ErikaToda

Erika Toda (戸田 恵梨香, Toda Erika; born August 17, 1988) is a Japanese actress.

== Career ==
Toda has starred in many Japanese television dramas, including Liar Game, Code Blue, Ryusei no Kizuna, and Keizoku 2: SPEC. She has also had supporting roles in many other popular TV dramas, such as Boss, Nobuta wo Produce, Engine, and Gal Circle. In the manga adaptation movie, Death Note, she played the role of Misa Amane.

== Personal life ==
In 2020, Toda married actor Tori Matsuzaka, who co-starred in the 2015 film April Fools.

On November 28, 2022, the agency announced that Toda was pregnant. On May 4, 2023, Toda gave birth to her first child.

== Filmography ==
=== TV dramas ===
| Year | Title | Role | Notes | Ref. |
|---|---|---|---|---|
| 2000 | Audrey | Takino Yoshioka (young) | Asadora | |
| 2005 | Calling You | Erika | | |
| 2005 | Nobuta wo Produce | Mariko Uehara | | |
| 2006 | The Queen's Classroom Special Part 1 | Ai Ikeuchi | | |
| 2006 | Gal Circle | Saki | | |
| 2006 | Kiseki no Dōbutsuen: Asahiyama Dōbutsuen Monogatari | Sawako Izumi | Television film | |
| 2006 | Mō Hitotsu no Sugar & Spice | Minami Inoue | | |
| 2006 | Love of My Life | Yūko Motomiya | | |
| 2007 | Tsubasa no Oreta Tenshitachi 2 | Haruka Saitō | Lead role; Episode 2 "Sakura" | |
| 2007 | Kiseki no Dōbutsuen 2007: Asahiyama Dōbutsuen Monogatari | Sawako Izumi | Television film | |
| 2007 | Hana Yori Dango 2 | Umi Nakajima | | |
| 2007 | Ushi ni Negai o: Love & Farm | Kazumi Chiba | | |
| 2007–09 | Liar Game | Kanzaki Nao | Lead role; 2 seasons | |
| 2008 | Yukinojo Henge | Namiji | Television film | |
| 2008 | Kiseki no Dōbutsuen 2008: Asahiyama Dōbutsuen Monogatari | Sawako Izumi | Television film | |
| 2008–17 | Code Blue | Mihoko Hiyama | 3 seasons | |
| 2008 | Arigato, Okan | Kiyoko Nishida | Television film | |
| 2008 | Ties of Shooting Stars | Shizuna Ariake | | |
| 2009 | Code Blue: New Year Special | Mihoko Hiyama | Television film | |
| 2009–11 | Boss | Mami Kimoto | 2 seasons | |
| 2010 | Kiseki no Dōbutsuen 2010: Asahiyama Dōbutsuen Monogatari | Sawako Izumi | Television film | |
| 2010 | Unubore Keiji | Yūko Hashiba / Yuri Akishima | | |
| 2010 | Keizoku 2: SPEC | Tōma Saya | | |
| 2011 | You Taught Me All the Precious Things | Uemura Natsumi | Lead role | |
| 2012 | The Locked Room Murders | Aoto Junko | | |
| 2013 | SPEC: Zero SP | Tōma Saya | Television film | |
| 2013 | Summer Nude | Hanao Taniyama | | |
| 2013 | Hana no Kusari | Satsuki Takano | Lead role | |
| 2013 | A Clinic on the Sea | Hikaru Hatori | | |
| 2013 | Mitani Kōki Daikūkou 2013 | Yuriko Kurashina | | |
| 2015 | Yokokuhan: The Pain | Erika Yoshino | | |
| 2015 | Risk no Kamisama | Kaori Kamikari | | |
| 2016 | Kono Machi no Inochi ni | Aki Hataeda | | |
| 2017 | Reverse | Mihoko Ochi | | |
| 2018 | Hotel on the Brink | Sakurai Sana | | |
| 2019–20 | Scarlet | Kimiko Kawahara | Lead role; Asadora | |
| 2021 | Police in a Pod | Seiko Fuji | Lead role | |
| 2026 | Straight to Hell | Kazuko Hosoki | Lead role | |
| 2026 | Reboot | Ichika Kogo | | |

=== Films ===
| Year | Title | Role | Notes | Ref. |
|---|---|---|---|---|
| 2006 | Death Note | Misa Amane | | |
| 2006 | Death Note 2: The Last Name | Misa Amane | | |
| 2007 | Heaven Can Wait. Maybe... | Minako Ueno | | |
| 2007 | Ten Nights of Dream | Mikiko Yagi | | |
| 2007 | Presents: Sea Urchin Rice Cracker | Haduki Matsushita | Lead role | |
| 2008 | L: Change the World | Misa Amane | Cameo | |
| 2008 | Tea Fight | Mikiko | | |
| 2009 | Days with You | Natsuki Kashiwagi | Lead role | |
| 2009 | Goemon | Tayū Yūgiri | | |
| 2009 | Amalfi: Rewards of the Goddess | Kanae Adachi | | |
| 2009 | The Unbroken | Junko Onchi | | |
| 2009 | Chasing My Girl | Eriko | | |
| 2010 | Liar Game: The Final Stage | Nao Kanzaki | Lead role | |
| 2011 | Hankyu Railways - A 15-Minute Miracle | Misa | | |
| 2011 | Andalucia: Revenge of the Goddess | Kanae Adachi | | |
| 2011 | Dog×Police | Natsuki Mizuno | | |
| 2012 | SPEC: Ten | Tōma Saya | Lead role | |
| 2013 | SPEC: Close | Tōma Saya | Lead role | |
| 2015 | April Fools | Ayumi Nitta | Lead role | |
| 2015 | Kakekomi | Jogo | | |
| 2015 | Prophecy | Erika Yoshino | | |
| 2015 | The Emperor in August | Reiko | Special appearance | |
| 2016 | Death Note: Light Up the New World | Misa Amane | | |
| 2017 | Blade of the Immortal | Makie Otono-Tachibana | | |
| 2019 | The Day's Organ | Kaede Itakura | Lead role | |
| 2019 | Almost a Miracle | Aoi Yoshitaka | | |
| 2019 | The First Supper | Miyako | | |
| 2022 | Motherhood | Rumiko | Lead role | |

=== Japanese dub ===
| Year | Title | Role | Notes | Ref. |
|---|---|---|---|---|
| 2007 | Arthur and the Minimoys | Princess Selenia | | |

=== Video games ===
| Year | Title | Role | Notes | Ref. |
|---|---|---|---|---|
| 2006 | Genji: Days of the Blade | Shizuka Gozen | | |

== Awards and nominations ==
| Year | Award | Category | Work(s) | Result | Ref. |
|---|---|---|---|---|---|
| 2009 | 33rd Elan d'or Awards | Newcomer of the Year | Herself | Won | |
| 2009 | 2nd Tokyo Drama Awards | Best Supporting Actress | Ties of Shooting Stars | Won | |
| 2013 | 16th Nikkan Sports Drama Grand Prix | Best Supporting Actress | The Locked Room Murders | Won | |
| 2020 | 23rd Nikkan Sports Drama Grand Prix | Best Actress | Scarlet | Won | |
| 2026 | 29th Nikkan Sports Drama Grand Prix | Best Supporting Actress | Reboot | Won | |

== Bibliography ==
=== Magazines ===
- Myojo (Shueisha), The December 2006 issue, "Best Friends: Dare mo Shiranakatta Toda Erika Monogatari"

=== Photobooks ===
- Sanwa Mook Naisho na Jumon (Sanwa Publishing, January 2002). ISBN 4883568776.
- Hajimete Kimi to Deatta Natsuyasumi. (Saibunkan, November 2002). ISBN 4916115937.
- nature (Bunka Publishing, August 2003). ISBN 4821125471.
- Sanwa Mook Umareta Izumi (Sanwa Publishing, August 2004). ISBN 477690036X.
- Sei Kore Ism 3 (Shueisha, October 2004). ISBN 4081020515.
- Erika x Cecil McBee Vivace (Shueisha, April 2009). ISBN 4081020787.
- Iqueen Vol.7 (Parco Entertainment, March 2012). ISBN 4891949465.
