= Liar Game: The Final Stage =

- Japanese poster
- Directed by: Hiroaki Matsuyama
- Screenplay by: Tsutomu Kuroiwa; Michinao Okada; Toshio Yoshitaka
- Based on: Liar Game by Shinobu Kaitani
- Produced by: Takashi Ishihara; Iku Wada; Chihiro Kameyama; Kazuhiko Torishima; Yoshinari Shimatani; Tomoyuki Miyakawa; Shinya Koto
- Starring: Toda Erika; Matsuda Shota
- Cinematography: Nobu Miyata
- Music by: Yasutaka Nakata (capsule)
- Distributed by: Fuji Television; Toho Company Ltd.
- Release date: March 6, 2010
- Running time: 133 minutes
- Country: Japan
- Language: Japanese

Liar Game: The Final Stage (ライアーゲーム ザ・ファイナルステージ, Raiā Gēmu: Za Fainaru Sutēji) is a 2010 Japanese film directed by Hiroaki Matsuyama. The film is a continuation of the popular Fuji Television drama series, Liar Game.

It was released in Japan on March 6, 2010, and was subsequently released in Singapore (August 12, 2010) and Hong Kong (October 7, 2010). Furthermore, it has been confirmed that the film will be shown in Macau, Malaysia, Indonesia and Brunei.

== Synopsis ==
Kanzaki originally withdrew from the Liar Game Tournament after the semi-finals, but receives a spot in the final due to Yokoya's withdrawal. At the location of the final stage, she reunites with fellow players from previous stages: Akiyama, Etou, and Fukunaga.

The final stage is based on the Garden of Eden. During each round, players will pick either a gold, silver or red apple to brand their name on. If only gold or silver are picked, those in the majority earn 100 million, while those in the minority lose 100 million; but if all players only choose one colour between silver and gold, they all lose 100 million. Players earn 100 million if all choose red. However, if any players choose gold or silver, those with red apples lose 100 million, while those with gold or silver earn 100 million. If only one player chooses gold or silver, that player gets 200 million. If only one player chooses red, that player loses 1 billion; any player with a debt of over 500 million is eliminated. To prevent cooperation, players cannot share the prize money with each other.

The altruistic Kanzaki urges everyone to choose red so that all will profit. The others agree, but many betray her and vote otherwise, as choosing red is risking a loss. To secure a voting majority, Fukunaga forms an alliance with Akiyama, Kanzaki, Kuji, Sendou and Takeda. However, Fukunaga promptly betrays them to join the group of the rest of the players: Etou, Igarashi, Momose, Nishida and group leader Sakamaki. Many players incur losses as the groups battle. The players again try to all choose red, but two players betray. Akiyama identifies the first as Nishida, and labels the unknown second as "X".

Due to X's machinations, Akiyama loses 1 billion and is eliminated. Takeda claims responsibility as X. Akiyama was trying to save Kanzaki from elimination, who was herself trying to save Takeda. Akiyama is brought to meet his former rival Yokoya, who declares he will pay Akiyama's debt in exchange for the final prize worth of 5 billion, whether Akiyama wins or not.

The next round, Takeda loses 1 billion due to X, but survives. She lied about being X due to the pressure of being in first place throughout the game. X takes over in first place. Akiyama returns and exposes Sendou as X. Akiyama disguises a red apple as silver, causing Sendou to lose 1 billion.

With one round to go, only Sendou is in debt, owing 200 million. Kanzaki urges Sendou to choose silver and others to choose red so that Sendou can pay his debt. Although their profits would decrease, everyone else agrees. Sendou instead chooses red because he would not listen to instruction. As a result, all players chose red. The players celebrate. Akiyama wins the game; he passes all his winnings to Yokoya, and has Yokoya pay off Sendou's debt. Yokoya returns the rest of the money to Akiyama.

Liar Game organizer Eri reveals to Kanzaki and Akiyama that the entire tournament was based on bets by wealthy investors on whether an unprecedented all-red vote would occur. With it finally happening, most investors lost their enormous bets, and Liar Game may not be held again. Kanzaki and Akiyama were specially brought in by investors betting on an all-red result. Eri congratulates the duo for defeating human greed. The duo use the prize money to repay the debts of earlier losers of the Liar Game.

Kanzaki asks Akiyama not to leave her. He asks if she can live with his lies, she says she can.

== Cast ==
- Toda Erika as Kanzaki Nao
- Shota Matsuda as Akiyama Shinichi
- Tanabe Seiichi as Sendou Arata
- Suzuki Kosuke as Fukunaga Yuuji
- Arakawa Yoshiyoshi as Nishida Jirou
- Hamada Mari as Sakamaki Mai
- Wada Soukou as Etou Kouichi
- Akimoto Yuuki as Momose Norika
- Nagayama Kento as Kuji Satoshi
- Suzuki Kazuma as Yokoya Norihiko
- Megumi Seki as Takeda Yukina
- Kichise Michiko as Eri
- Watanabe Ikkei as Tanimura Mitsuo
- Matsumura Yuuki as Igarashi Mamoru

== Release ==
=== Theatrical run ===
Two weeks after the launching of the film, more than one million people had gone to the theatres to watch the film. Moreover, in its opening week the film entered the Japanese box office as number two and consequently stayed in the top ten for another five weeks.

=== DVD release ===
The film was released on DVD and Blu-ray Disc in Japan on September 9, 2010. Blu-ray releases include a standard edition and premium edition. The premium edition contains a bonus disc with an all-cast interview, a making of (starring Toda Erika), a real Liar Game featuring twenty-eight female TV-hosts, trailers, stage event, a leaflet and three postcards.

== See also ==
- Shi Islet
