= Love Shuffle =

- Genre: Romance
- Country of origin: Japan
- Original language: Japanese
- No. of seasons: 1
- No. of episodes: 10

Production
- Running time: 54 minutes

Original release
- Network: TBS
- Release: 16 January – 20 March 2009

Love Shuffle (金曜ドラマ・ラブ♥シャッフル, Kin'yō Dorama Rabu Shaffuru) is a Japanese television drama series that aired on TBS from 16 January to 20 March 2009. The theme song of the series is Fantasy by Earth, Wind & Fire. Usami Kei is a salaryman who has risen in status due to his engagement with Mei, the wealthy daughter of his company's president. Shortly after she breaks off the engagement, a power failure leaves him stuck in the elevator of his apartment building. Trapped with him are three others living on the same floor - Airu, a trilingual interpreter, Ojiro, a model photographer, and Masato, a psychiatrist. While waiting, their conversation hits upon their love lives and the question of whether there is truly only one fated partner for everyone. As a result, they decide to try "shuffling" their relationships with each other. --Tokyograph

== Cast ==
- Tamaki Hiroshi as Usami Kei
- Karina as Aizawa Airu
- Matsuda Shota as Sera Ojiro
- Tanihara Shosuke as Kikuta Masato

=== Additional Cast ===
- Kanjiya Shihori as Kagawa Mei

Mei is the fiancée of Kei, even though he is her first love she feels that their relationship has drawn the life out of the man she fell in love with. She breaks off the engagement to save Kei from further suffering at the company he hates. She genuinely loves him and wants him to be happy. Throughout the drama she tries to experience new things and grow as a woman, since she has only loved one man her entire life, Kei. She starts to feel a connection with Yukichi but chooses Kei and wishes to get married as planned at the end of the shuffle.

- DAIGO as Oishi Yukichi

Yukichi is the boyfriend of Airu, he is extremely wealthy and always carries around a suitcase full of cash. He is quick to spend money often buying out whole restaurants for dates. He was often bullied as a child and even thought of committing suicide. Since then he becomes very attached to people and tends to go overboard when he likes someone. He is deeply in love / obsessed with Airu. He sees nothing wrong with using his money to get his way or spy on people. Even putting a tracking device on Kei's cellphone. At first he joins the shuffle to win Airu's heart but he has no problem sleeping with Reiko and later falls in love with Mei after he overhears her say she started to like him. He then begins to try and break up Kei and Mei, even thought he and Kei have become best friends. They eventually team up so Yukichi can win Mei's heart and they marry instead of she and Kei.

- Kojima Hijiri as Kamijo Reiko

Reiko is the rich married lover of Ojiro. She joins the shuffle claiming she wants to experience love and to feel beautiful since her husband is cheating on her with a younger woman. She has the theory that it is okay if she sleeps with other men because her soul mate is her husband and that will never change. Later it is revealed that her husband knew about the shuffle and was okay with it, they participate so Reiko can conceive a child. She becomes pregnant after spending one week with each of the men. She tells the men it doesn't matter who the father is since it will be her husband's child. In the end it is revealed that she wishes to divorce her husband since he is cheating on her and never truly loved her. She does confide that the child's father is actually Masato since she never had sex with Kei or Yukichi and the timing isn't right for it to be Ojiro's since they haven't slept together since before the shuffle started.

- Yoshitaka Yuriko as Hayakawa Kairi

Kairi is a young art genius who paints the image of Thanatos. She is a patient of Masato's, she claims to see Thanatos everywhere she goes and he wishes for her to kill herself. She has made a promise that she won't commit suicide before her 20th birthday. She joins the shuffle simply because Masato tells her too. She is very emotionless and doesn't speak often. As the shuffle goes on and she dates the different men she begins to react more and express emotions. She smiled and seemed happy after Kei won her a defective panda plushy from a claw game during their date. She does fall in love with Ojiro after their week together, even though he seems indifferent and mocks her for "pretending" to want to die. She has sex with him and later follows him around as if his pet. Even though she still wishes to die she does begin to open up thanks to the attention and affection from Ojiro. He also reluctantly falls in love with her. During her 20th birthday party Ojiro makes her promise that she will only die after he does and she will stay by his side until then. The next day she vanishes, it is assumed that she killed herself when actually Masato told her to leave so she could see that effect her death would have on those who love her. After seeing Ojiro mourn her she decides to stay with him and not die until he does.

== Episodes ==
=== Season 1 ===
Episode	Subtitle	Subtitle (Japanese)	Rating (Kantō Region)
01	Let's Exchange Lovers?	恋人交換する?	10.0
02	Is There Only One Destined Soul Mate?	運命の人は一人だけですか?	10.7
03	Is This Love or Friendship?	愛情なのか友情なのか	08.2
04	I Will Be The One to Protect You	君を守るのは僕だ	09.6
05	My Search For Work and a Poolside Confession	僕の就職とプールの告白	08.9
06	The One Who Resembles My Former Girlfriend is You	元カノに似てるのは君なんだ	08.3
07	Confession on a Night with a Full Moon	満月の夜の告白	07.6
08	A Kiss That's Sudden Like a Blaze	キスは突然炎のごとく	07.5
09	The Flip Side of Love is Loneliness	愛の裏返しは孤独だった	07.0
10	For the Sake of Meeting One's Destined Soul Mate	運命の人にめぐり逢うために	10.1

== Method Of Shuffling And Each week's partners ==
Method	With Jacks and Queens, clubs, diamonds and spades (8 cards), the man having the Jack of one suit matches with the woman who has the Queen of the same suit and become a couple for a week.
Episode 1	(Before the start of the Love Shuffle, the original lover / acquaintance relationship)
Episode 2	(1st Round) Kei Usami & Mei Kagawa / Yukichi Oishi & Aizawa Airu / Ojiro Sera & Reiko Kamijo / Masato Kikuta & Kairi Hayakawa
Episode 3	(1st Round) Usami Kei & Kamijo Reiko / Oishi Yukichi & Hayakawa Kairi / Sera Ojiro & Aizawa Airu / Kikuta Masato & Kagawa Mei
Episode 4	(1st Round) Usami Kei & Aizawa Airu / Oishi Yukichi & Kagawa Mei / Sera Ojiro & Hayakawa Kairi / Kikuta Masato & Kamijo Reiko
Episode 5	(original partners) Usami Kei & Kagawa Mei / Oishi Yukichi & Aizawa Airu / Sera Ojiro & Kamijo Reiko / Kikuta Masato & Hayakawa Kairi
Episode 6	(2nd Round) Usami Kei & Kamijo Reiko / Oishi Yukichi & Hayakawa Kairi / Sera Ojiro & Aizawa Airu / Kikuta Masato & Kagawa Mei
Episode 7	(2nd Round) Usami Kei & Hayakawa Kairi / Oishi Yuikichi & Ojo Kyoko / Sera Ojiro & Kagawa Mei / Kikuta Masato & Aizawa Airu
