= Emilio Cavallini =

Italian fashion designer (born 1945)

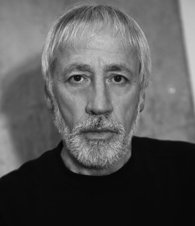
- Cavallini in 2010
- Born: 1945 (age 80–81); San Miniato, Tuscany, Italy

Emilio Cavallini (born 1945) is an Italian fashion designer, particularly noted for his hosiery collections.

== Biography ==
From 1964 to 1966, he attended College in Florence "Universita' di Firenze, Economia e Commercio". He quit college because of this fascination with the world of fashion and went to the "Swinging London". He met Mary Quant, his passion for hosiery started and started to dress women's legs with patterned hosiery. He developed pantyhoses with black/white patterns, dots, starts and skulls, stripes, animal and different kids of fishnets. He loved the fluorescent colors.

In 1970, he opened in San Miniato his own company, Stilnovo Spa. Besides Mary Quant he started producing for the most important brands such as Dior, Celine, Roberta di Camerino, Balenciaga, Gucci, Alexander McQueen and more..

In 1980, he launched his own brand of Emilio Cavallini hosiery. It was an immediate success, he started designing shoes, leather accessories, bathing suits and a full avant-garde clothing line for young men and women. Licensees' retail stores started to open in Florence, Milan, Rome, Paris, Düsseldorf, London, Hong Kong and Tokyo. He had a runway show in Paris with his line for men and in Milan for women. He became member for Milan Chamber of Fashion. In the 1980s, he believed that the time to look for new clothing forms is over and he started to develop clothing without seams on special seamless machines with large cylinders that were intended for hosiery. He launches the collection in New York and continues developing a large tight that covers the whole body.

In 2009, Stilnovo S.p.A. produces 4 million fashion tights per year and sells worldwide. Currently he is working on a building and archive with the patterns and techniques he developed in 40 years of design. He also nourishes his passion for current and ancient art. This passion leads him to build art pieces of various forms and dimensions using tights as if they were strings, he uses his mathematical knowledge to figure out the tensions of yarns.

== Awards, Prizes and Acknowledgments ==
- In 1986 Italian President Francesco Cossiga made him "Cavaliere del lavoro".
- In 1989 Italian President Francesco Cossiga made him "Ufficiale"
- In 1989 he won "Leone d'oro" prize in Venice for fashion.
- In 1993 Italian President Oscar Luigi Scalfaro made him "Commendatore".

== Sources ==
- Official Italian website of national acknowledgments
- Some Biographic Informations
- "1988 article about opening of Emilio Cavallini store in New York". Daily News Record. November 11, 1988. Archived from the original on November 2, 2012 – via HighBeam Research.
