= Liar Game (2007 TV series) =

Japanese television series

- Genre: Drama, psychological
- Based on: Liar Game by Shinobu Kaitani
- Directed by: Hiroaki Matsuyama
- Starring: Erika Toda; Shota Matsuda
- Theme music composer: Yasutaka Nakata
- Country of origin: Japan
- Original language: Japanese
- No. of episodes: 11

Production
- Producer: Shimuta Toru
- Production location: Japan
- Production company: Fuji Television

Original release
- Network: FNS (Fuji TV)
- Release: 14 April – 23 June 2007

Related
- Liar Game: Season 2 Liar Game: The Final Stage

Liar Game is a 2007 Japanese live action television drama series directed by Hiroaki Matsuyama, adapted from a manga of the same name. The drama began airing in Japan on April 14, 2007. It featured Erika Toda as Nao Kanzaki, and Shota Matsuda as Shinichi Akiyama. The first season of Liar Game had 11 episodes, with a 3 hour long finale, which was a first for a drama series. It has also gained the second highest viewer satisfaction rating, for the season, in an Oricon survey.

== Cast ==
=== Players ===
Cast	Role	Description
Erika Toda	Kanzaki Nao (18)	Honest + Naive College Student.
Shota Matsuda	Akiyama Shinichi (26)	"Genius Swindler"; Ex-convict for bankrupting MLM Company
Soichiro Kitamura	Fujisawa Kazuo	Nao's former junior high school teacher (now retired)
Soko Wada	Etou Koichi	(leopard skin clothing)
Mayuko Iwasa	Ishida Rie	(black sunglasses and white pantsuit)
Makoto Sakamoto	Ono Wataru	Fish Store Clerk (thick black rimmed glasses)
Yoshiyuki Morishita	Tsuchida Yasufumi	(older, crooked teeth)
Shingo Ippongi	Makita Tomoyuki (56)	President of small workshop
Hiroo Otaka	Kida Noriyuki (48)	Business Company Clerk
Yuki Umishima	Takamura Yoshimi (29)	Housewife
Yoshio Doi	Sajima Kenta (34)	Actor
Sachiko Nakagome	Aso Hiromi (29)	Truck Driver
Masayuki Izumi	Okano Kenya	
Hajime Aoki	Kinoshita Keigo	
Fumiko Mizuta	Kawamura Chisato (22)	Model
Akiko Hatakeyama	Nozoe Keiko (40)	Housewife
Naoki Yukishima	Sugawara Yuji (22)	
Mitsunari Sakamoto	Nishino Takahiko (32)	Florist Shop assistant
Kinako Kobayashi	Kayama Harumi (26)	Restaurant Clerk
Yuki Baba	Hanayama Tetsuo (29)	TV Assistant Director
Tamao Yoshimura	Iimura Jun (31)	Housewife
Hitomi Kitahara	Nakaya Kazuko (21)	College Student
Kosuke Suzuki	Fukunaga Yuji	
Kazuma Suzuki	Yokoya	(white hair, clothes and shoes, green eyes); connected to MLM company that Akiyama bankrupted
Hiroko Taguchi	Takada Michiko	Unknown

=== Liar Game Tournament ===
Cast	Role	Description
Shigeo Kiyama	Solario (voice)	Liar Game main dealer
Ryoko Yuui	Dealer	
Michiko Kichise	Eri	Liar Game coordinator
Ikkei Watanabe	Tanimura Mitsuo	Cop with gold front tooth from Nao Kanzaki's city

== Episodes ==
No.	Title	Original release date
1	"A fierce battle of the wits begins over 100 million yen. Heart pounding psychological tricks keep the audience on the edge of their seats."	April 14, 2007
Nao Kanzaki is a young nurse who is extremely naive. Her honesty draws the attention of policeman Mitsuo Tanimura. Kanzaki receives a suitcase with 100 million yen, along with a message that she must participate in the Liar Game Tournament. The first round of the tournament sees players having to return 100 million back to the organizers after one month. Players are paired up as opponents, and may steal the opponent's money as a prize. Losers unable to pay will be in debt to the organizers. Kanzaki's opponent is her former teacher Mr. Fujisawa. She goes to meet him, and he suggests depositing their combined sum in a bank, thus tricking her into handing over all her money. Tanimura tells a distraught Kanzaki that the police cannot help, but someone else can: Shinichi Akiyama, a convicted fraudster who bankrupted a multinational company. Akiyama eventually agrees to help Kanzaki in exchange for half her winnings. They agree to steal Fujisawa's 200 million. Putting Fujisawa under constant supervision, Akiyama deduces the money is hidden in Fujisawa's living room. Fujisawa boasts that the money is in a safe.
2	"What will be the conclusion of the great struggle? What secret plan could Akiyama have up his sleeve to turn the tables?"	April 28, 2007
With the end of the first round imminent, Akiyama has not stolen the money. Fujisawa ignores a desperate Kanzaki. At 5 p.m., Fujisawa celebrates the end of the first round and his victory, while a suited man collects the money, claiming to be a tournament organizer. At 6 p.m., the real organizers arrive as the man leaves, passing the money to Akiyama, thus Kanzaki won. Akiyama tricked Fujisawa by substituting the organizers' letter to specify the wrong round ending time, then hired an accomplice. The organizers collect 100 million from Kanzaki. She gives 50 million to Akiyama, then 50 million to Fujisawa to help pay his debt. Akiyama follows suit, clearing Fujisawa's debt. Kanzaki must continue in the tournament because she cannot pay 50 million to withdraw. Tanimura (an agent of the organizers) brings Kanzaki to the second round's location by pretending to help her to quit the game. Akiyama joins the tournament. The second round is Minority Rule, where players answer a Yes/No question, and the majority are eliminated with a 100 million fine. Players are given a 100 million to be repaid at the end of the round. The winner receives the losers' fines of 2.1 billion.
3	"A competition for 2.2 billion yen, decided by minority vote, begins. Could you survive on this new stage?"	May 5, 2007
Akiyama had arrived too late to stop Kanzaki from taking part. At the organizers' suggestion, he joined the tournament as a substitute for a player who had been tricked into handing over her 100 million to another seemingly female player (labeled as "X"). Akiyama and Kanzaki agree to work together. The practice round question sees a minority voting that they were men when in reality it was the opposite. At Akiyama's behest, Kanzaki found out that most of the 22 contestants took part only because having spent or lost their winnings, they could not pay the withdrawal fee. Akiyama proposes a strategy to win by forming a group of 8, with half of the players voting each way, and the ultimate survivor sharing the 2.2 billion prize. Rie Ishida, who wears sunglasses, is suspected of being X. To exclude X, Kanzaki invites 6 men to join their team, and they sign a contract. One man, Yuu Tsukahara, suggests the team members talk freely to other players to allay suspicions of collusion. Tsukahara manages to converse with Ishida. The first question has a 12-10 result, and the majority players leave peacefully, drawing Akiyama's suspicions that X has already manipulated the game.
4	"X's identity is revealed at last! In this twist-filled drama, who will come out on top, X or Akiyama?"	May 12, 2007
The second question has a 4-6 result: Kanzaki is eliminated, while Akiyama, Tsukahara, Ishida and Koichi Etou survive. The third question sees Tsukahara agreeing to vote "Yes" and Akiyama agreeing to vote "No". The results are revealed one by one – Ishida and Etou both voted "No". Thinking that he has won, Tsukahara reveals himself as Yuuji Fukunaga and "X", who can imitate a woman's voice. Fukunaga admits he went on to form two other teams of 8 (including with Ishida and Etou), had Ishida survive to throw off suspicion, and planned to betray all three teams with a fake name on the contract. However, Akiyama instead voted "Yes" along with Fukunaga, rendering the question void. Akiyama theorizes that Fukunaga earlier dressed as a woman after tricking his female friend Tsukahara, and changed back as a man as substitutes were allowed. Fukunaga gave himself away as he knew X obtained the extra 100 million from the player Akiyama substituted in the form of a check. For the fourth question, Akiyama immediately and publicly votes "No", putting the other players in a dilemma: they can only be in a 1-3 minority by voting "Yes", but if all vote "Yes", Akiyama wins.
5	"Who will claim the 2.1 billion yen prize in this shocking conclusion? What is the true aim of the Liar Game Tournament? The fight shifts to a new arena."	May 19, 2007
Fukunaga and Etou decide to collude. Ishida offers to join in, but has secretly decided to collude with Akiyama. Fukunaga and Etou distrust each other, so Ishida throws in their "Yes" votes. She betrays them by also voting "Yes" – thus Akiyama won. The organizers order Fukunaga to return the stolen 100 million from the player Akiyama substituted. Akiyama earns 2.1 billion, and covers the debts of his team and Ishida's team, losing the means to withdraw from the tournament. He advances to the next round, intending to expose the mastermind behind this tournament of deceit. Tanimura meets Kanzaki to persuade her to rejoin the tournament. Tanimura recounts that Akiyama's mother (naive, just like Kanzaki) was seduced by a multi-level marketing organization and incurred huge debts upon withdrawal. She committed suicide to fund Akiyama's education through life insurance. Akiyama took revenge by swindling and destroying that organization, but was jailed for it. Tanimura urges Kanzaki to save Akiyama like how Akiyama saved her. Kanzaki enters a resurrection round (Restructuring Game) along with the 8 other players' from Etou's team, including Fukunaga, who were all in debt. All were loaned 100 million for the round, and only 1 would be eliminated.
6	"The surprising revival round begins: Restructuring Game! The ensnared Nao suffers alone, with nowhere to turn."	May 26, 2007
The Restructuring Game involves players going through 30 rounds of voting for five players that they think should proceed to the next round, with the person getting the fewest votes being "retrenched" and earning a debt of 100 million yen. The 100 million each player loans comes in the form of an "M Ticket", that can be used for transactions to buy things such as basic necessities from others, considering the game will last for almost a week and the participants are allowed to bring their personal belongings with them. Everyone colludes to make Fukunaga retrenched, until the person himself steps in and offers for everyone to engage in a little self-sharing on why they cannot fall into debt. When it comes to Nao's turn, he purposely reveals that she has no reason to play it because she isn't in debt, and turns everyone successfully against her. He then tricks her into casting all five for him in exchange for him casting for her. Now shunned by everyone and fooled by Fukunaga, Nao despairs but decides to play a game with Fukunaga as one last try to buy 10 votes from him in return for 30 million yen on her M Ticket, but loses quickly. Notified that Nao is trying to re-enter the Liar Game, Akiyama heads to the venue.
7	"Driven into a corner, Nao has fallen into despair. Could a miracle turn things around? Where is Akiyama?"	June 2, 2007
Akiyama finds Nao crying in despair and teaches her to cheat in the game against Fukunaga by marking the cards imperceptibly. With now 10 votes, Nao goes around to everyone other than Fukunaga to buy 10 votes from them using the remaining 70 million she has on her M Ticket, promising that she will still come in last with 20 votes and be retrenched, but lies that she can barely make it to third round after a player supposedly dropped out. This results in Nao amassing a total of 80 votes and leaving the others far behind, several of them at 41 and others at 40 tied for last place. Akiyama, who is being treated as Nao's possession in the game, begins charging players for a share of Nao's votes using their M Tickets and personal money. Instead of Fukunaga, Nao now controls the game because she can choose freely who she wants to retrench. Desperate, everyone heads there one at a time to buy two votes each for ridiculously extravagant prices, at the same time cancelling out the prices of the votes she bought from them.
8	"Akiyama works wonders at the Restructuring Game's conclusion. Onward to the next stage!"	June 9, 2007
Nao realises that as long as people aren't greedy or selfish, and choose to work together cooperatively instead, the Liar Game Agency will not profit and no one will be in debt either. As the first place winner earns a cash bonus of 100 million yen and has the right to leave the game by paying half of his/her earnings, Nao sees it as a chance to save someone with 200 million, and decides to do so for last place member Etou because he was always kind to her even after the others ignored her. She then redistributes the money earned from her votes so everyone gets 100 million yen to clear their debts while advancing to the next round. Following the conclusion of the Restructuring Game, everyone is immediately ushered to the venue of the third round, where they are split into teams of five as the Water Country and the Fire Country. Akiyama, Nao, Fukunaga, Ono Wataru and Aso Hiromi are in the Water Country together. A mysterious man named Yokoya joins the Fire Country and quickly becomes Akiyama's rival. The game requires players to smuggle money from the other country without being caught by a designated inspector of the other country, by making him/her believe that there is no money being smuggled or that there is lesser money than expected within the briefcase, that holds a maximum capacity of 100 million yen.
9	"A formidable new enemy appears in the Smuggling Game! Is victory possible? Nao and Akiyama begin to fight in this next round."	June 16, 2007
10	"Yokoya's terrifying true nature is revealed in a shocking development. Akiyama is enraged and Nao is devastated in this tumultuous round."	June 23, 2007
11	"The final game has been prepared. Despair, deception, betrayal, lies... and hope. Each player's true nature will be revealed, and all of Liar Game's secrets will become clear in this final encounter. Saturday's Premium Special Project: 3 Hour Special"	June 23, 2007
