= Liar Game =

Japanese manga series

- First tankōbon volume cover, featuring Nao Kanzaki (center) with Shinichi Akiyama (behind)
- Genre: Gambling; Psychological thriller
- Manga
- Written by: Shinobu Kaitani
- Published by: Shueisha
- Imprint: Young Jump Comics
- Magazine: Weekly Young Jump
- Original run: February 17, 2005 – January 22, 2015
- Volumes: 19
- Manga

Liar Game: The Last Game
- Written by: Shinobu Kaitani
- Published by: Shueisha
- Magazine: Grand Jump Mucha
- Original run: February 25, 2026 – July 22, 2026
- Volumes: 1 (Note: Numbered as the 20th volume of the overall series)
- Anime television series
- Directed by: Yuzo Sato (chief); Asami Kawano
- Written by: Tatsuhiko Urahata
- Music by: Yugo Kanno
- Studio: Madhouse
- Licensed by: Remow
- Original network: TXN (TV Tokyo), BS TV Tokyo, KTS, kkt!, AT-X, IBC, BBC
- Original run: April 7, 2026 – present
- Episodes: 26
- Live-action
- Liar Game (2007 TV series); Liar Game: Season 2 (2009 TV series); Liar Game: The Final Stage (2010 film); Liar Game: Reborn (2012 film); Liar Game (2014 TV series)
- icon

Liar Game (stylized in all caps) is a Japanese manga series written and illustrated by Shinobu Kaitani. It was serialized in Shueisha's seinen manga magazine Weekly Young Jump from February 2005 to January 2015. A short sequel, titled Liar Game: The Last Game, was serialized in Shueisha's Grand Jump Mucha from February to July 2026. The overall series's chapters were collected in 20 tankōbon volumes.

Liar Game was adapted into a Japanese television series in 2007, which was followed by a second season aired from 2009 to 2010. It was also adapted into two live action films: Liar Game: The Final Stage in 2010 and Liar Game: Reborn in 2012. A South Korean television series adaptation aired in 2014. An anime television series adaptation produced by Madhouse aired its first season from April to September 2026. A second season has been announced.

== Plot ==
An uncommonly naive college student named Nao Kanzaki receives a package containing 100 million yen (about US$1 million) and a note that she is now a contestant in the Liar Game Tournament. In this fictional tournament, contestants are encouraged to cheat and lie to obtain other contestants' money, with the losers forced to bear a debt proportional to their losses. When Nao's first opponent, a trusted former teacher, steals her money, she seeks assistance from a con man named Shinichi Akiyama. Though they manage to defeat him, Nao and Akiyama decide to buy out his debt and advance through different rounds of the Liar Game Tournament against merciless contestants, while at the same time attempting to free their opponents from debt and defeat the Liar Game organization from within.

== Characters ==
=== Main characters ===
Nao Kanzaki (神崎 直, Kanzaki Nao)
Voiced by: Saya Hitomi (Japanese); Reshel Mae (English)
An exceptionally honest and initially naive college student who becomes an unwilling participant in the Liar Game. Her unwavering integrity and emotional perceptiveness, though initially perceived as weaknesses, enable her to earn contestants' trust while developing critical judgment. Despite opportunities to withdraw, she persists in the competition to rescue indebted participants. Her sole family connection is her terminally ill father, leaving her socially isolated until forming a profound bond with fellow player Akiyama, who alleviates her loneliness. Her moral conviction that all individuals possess inherent value shapes her gameplay strategy and interpersonal dynamics.
Shinichi Akiyama (秋山 深一, Akiyama Shin'ichi)
Voiced by: Takeo Ōtsuka (Japanese); Nick Huber (English)
A Teito University graduate in criminal psychology who turns to con artistry to dismantle the multi-level marketing scheme that drove his mother to suicide. After prison, he reluctantly assists Nao in the Liar Game, possibly recognizing parallels between her plight and his mother's. Entering in Round 2 as a substitute player, Akiyama emerges as an unofficial leader by Round 3. He strategically leverages Nao's genuine emotional appeals to influence other contestants while persistently attempting to settle her debt and remove her from danger. Akiyama's ultimate objective remains exposing and destroying the Liar Game organization itself.

=== Antagonists ===
Kazuo Fujisawa (藤沢 和雄, Fujisawa Kazuo)
Voiced by: Nobuo Tobita (Japanese); Paul T. Taylor (English)
Nao's former teacher and first opponent in the Liar Game. He undergoes a significant transformation from a caring educator to a bitter, distrustful individual following personal hardships including divorce. His callous indifference to Nao's potential financial ruin shocks her but reinforces Akiyama's resolve to assist her. After losing to Akiyama's strategy in the first round, Fujisawa receives Nao's winnings to settle his debt, culminating in a grateful bow that contrasts sharply with his earlier hostility.
Yuji Fukunaga (福永 ユウジ, Fukunaga Yuuji)
Voiced by: Yō Taichi
A trans woman introduced in Round 2 as "Hitomi". She is a skilled manipulator and 5th-degree black belt whose motivations alternate between financial gain and personal vengeance. Presenting various gender expressions—from femme fatale to masculine drag—she demonstrates remarkable adaptability in both gameplay and social manipulation. During Round 3, she forms an alliance with Nao and Akiyama, continuing voluntarily despite clearing her debt. Forced to face Yokoya alone in the revival round, she accumulates over one billion yen in debt and is eliminated. Though initially dismissive of Nao's abilities, Fukunaga gradually develops respect for her while maintaining ambiguous feelings toward Akiyama.
Norihiko Yokoya (横谷 憲彦, Yokoya Norihiko)
Voiced by: Natsuki Hanae
A dominant and calculating participant introduced in Round 3, who emerges as Akiyama's primary rival. A wealthy, eerily composed young man often seen carrying white mice and dressed in militaristic attire, he admires historical dictators like Adolf Hitler. His strategy revolves around bribing other contestants to create an absolute dictatorship within his team, contrasting sharply with Nao's cooperative approach. Though initially planning to withdraw after Round 3, Nao provokes him into continuing, fueling his vengeful determination to defeat her and Akiyama. After losing Round 4, Yokoya persists, aiming for ultimate victory. His ability to predict the Third Revival Round's game stems from prior knowledge of the Liar Game's literary inspiration, not deduction as he claims. Ultimately defeated by Akiyama in the finals, Yokoya concedes, acknowledging the need to retreat. His father, revealed as a Liar Game host, had trained him in manipulation to groom him as a successor.
Takashi Harimoto (ハリモト タカシ, Harimoto Takashi)
An elderly man distinguished by his long robes and straw hat. He first appears in Round 4 as the charismatic leader of the Peaceful Heaven cult. His manipulative prowess stems from exploiting emotional vulnerabilities rather than psychological tactics like Akiyama or Yokoya. Three devoted female followers—Mika Mikamoto, Kei Kimura, and Yukiko Abe—unconditionally support him in the Liar Game, bolstering his advantage. Harimoto controls his cult by propagating a fabricated mythology involving demons and human lineage, claiming to purify bloodlines. His methods rely on cold reading, having recruited each member during their lowest emotional states. After defeat in Round 4, he and his followers return in the Revival Round but ultimately withdraw, moved by Nao's unwavering integrity. They relinquish their winnings to alleviate other players' debts.

=== Liar Game Tournament Office ===
The LGT Office operates as the clandestine organization behind the Liar Game Tournament, structured to experimentally recreate scenarios from a suppressed radical political text. Its membership comprises two specialized roles: masked "handlers" who directly manage contestants and distribute game information, and observing "hosts" who supervise tournament rounds. The organization represents a second attempt at this social experiment, following an aborted initial trial. Several key members' identities eventually become known to participants through the tournament's progression.

Mitsuo Tanimura (谷村 光男, Tanimura Mitsuo)
Voiced by: Kazuhiro Nakaya (Japanese); Randy Pearlman (English)
He first appears as a legal consultant whom Nao contacts about the Liar Game. Unbeknownst to her, he secretly works for the tournament organization, preventing participants from seeking outside help. As Nao's assigned Liar Game representative, Tanimura suggests employing a scam artist to win—a tactic that ultimately draws Akiyama into the competition. Unlike other tournament staff, Tanimura operates without concealing his identity.
Leronira (レロニラ, Reronira)
Voiced by: Yōji Ueda
One of the Liar Game's masked hosts, distinguished by his ornate facial covering and formal attire. While he admires Akiyama and Fukunaga's intellectual prowess, he expresses particular fascination with Nao's unconventional participation. Demonstrating superior analytical skills among the hosts, he correctly anticipates Nao's transformative impact on the game's dynamics. His deep understanding of Akiyama's thought processes hints at his prior experience as a participant in the original Liar Game. Ultimately revealed as Okabe, Akiyama's former psychology professor, Leronira's true identity connects the tournament's present and past iterations.
Nearco (ネアルコ, Nearuko)
Voiced by: Jun Fukuyama
A Liar Game co-host, distinguished by his mustachioed mask. Introduced in Round 3, he demonstrates analytical prowess while maintaining particular admiration for Yokoya, whom he considers formidable. His skepticism toward Leronira's faith in Nao's abilities contrasts with his otherwise perceptive nature, though his intellect falls short of Leronira and Rabelais' standards.
Solario (ソラリオ, Sorario)
Voiced by: Daisuke Namikawa
A host of the Liar Game, wearing a mask with a sun drawn on the right eye. Solario is impressed that Nao is able to realize the objective of Second Revival Round before any of the other players.
Forli (フォルリ, Foruri)
A Liar Game host, distinguished by his bowtie-adorned suit and distinctive mask resembling Renaissance clown face-paint with elongated oval markings. As the moderator for Round 4's qualifier matches, he demonstrates overt favoritism toward Akiyama and Nao's team, frequently marveling at Akiyama's strategies despite his full knowledge of the game rules. He is considered the least intellectually capable among the LGT officers.
Kurifuji (栗藤, Kurifuji)
Yokoya's assigned family agent, tasked with ensuring his safety while concealing her identity behind sunglasses and a surgical mask. With a background in psychology, she demonstrates superior understanding of Yokoya's strategies, consistently anticipating his maneuvers more effectively than other LGT Office members.
Alsab (アルサブ, Arusabu)
One of the Liar Game hosts, moderating Round 4 and its qualifier for Fukunaga's team. His mask features distinctive Yin and yang and I Ching symbolism. Holding a cynical view of human nature, he believes people are inherently selfish and incapable of cooperation—a perspective ultimately challenged by Nao and Akiyama's collaborative strategies. Unlike his colleague Leronira, Alsab consistently underestimates Nao's influence in the game.
Silien (シリーン, Shirīn)
A Liar Game host, moderating Revival Round III for Group A.
Rabelais (ラブレー, Raburē)
A Liar Game host, overseeing Revival Round III for Group B. He is revealed to be Yokoya's father, a wealthy and prominent figure who dominated nearly all games in the previous tournament according to Leronira.
Altair (アルタイル, Arutairu)
Liar Game's Chief Executive, overseeing Revival Round III and Round 5. His identity is ultimately revealed as Nao's father, who orchestrated her participation out of concern for her extreme naivety and survival capabilities.

== Media ==
=== Manga ===
Written and illustrated by Shinobu Kaitani, Liar Game was serialized in Shueisha's seinen manga magazine Weekly Young Jump from February 17, 2005, to January 22, 2015. Shueisha collected its chapters in nineteen tankōbon volumes, released from September 16, 2005, to April 17, 2015.

A short story, titled Liar Game: Roots of A, was published as the title piece of a Shinobu Kaitani's anthology on July 18, 2008. A short-term series, titled Liar Game: The Last Game, was serialized in Shueisha's Grand Jump Mucha from February 25 to July 22, 2026. Its chapters were collected in a single tankōbon volume, published as the 20th volume of Liar Game on October 19, 2026.

=== Live-action ===
Liar Game was adapted into a Japanese television series: Liar Game, a 2007 series broadcast on Fuji Television, followed in 2009 by a second season. In 2010, the full-length film Liar Game: The Final Stage was released as a continuation to the television series. A sequel, entitled Liar Game: Reborn, was released in 2012.

A 2014 Korean drama adaptation, also titled Liar Game, aired on cable channel tvN.

=== Anime ===
An anime television series adaptation was announced during Remow's panel at Anime NYC 2025, on August 22, 2025. It is produced by Madhouse and directed by Asami Kawano, with Yuzo Sato serving as chief director, Tatsuhiko Urahata writing and supervising scripts, Kei Tsuchiya designing the characters, and Yugo Kanno composing the music. The first season aired from April 7 to September 29, 2026, on TV Tokyo and its affiliates, as well as other networks, (Note: TV Tokyo listed the series premiere on April 6 at 24:00, which is effectively April 7 at midnight JST.) running for two consecutive cours. The first opening theme song is "Bubble" (あぶく), performed by Yorushika, while the first ending theme song is "Asahi" (朝日), performed by Lucky Kilimanjaro. The second opening theme song is "All In", performed by Kroi, while the second ending theme song is "Tarinai" (たりない; lit. 'Not enough'), performed by Muque.

Immediately following the first season's finale, a second season was announced.

Remow licensed the series for streaming on Crunchyroll (excluding Japan and China).

==== Episodes ====
| No. | Title | Directed by (Note: Production staff information is taken from the ending credits of each episode.) | Written by | Storyboarded by | Original release date |
|---|---|---|---|---|---|
| 1 | "The Legendary Con Artist"; Transliteration: "Densetsu no Sagi-shi" (Japanese: 伝説の詐欺師) | Takahiro Umehara | Tatsuhiko Urahata | Asami Kawano | April 7, 2026 |
Nao, noted for her honesty, finds ¥100 million and an invitation to the Liar's Game Tournament (LGT). She is given 30 days to steal the ¥100 million belonging to her opponent. Afterwards she may keep any money she has stolen, but if her money is stolen she must pay it back herself. She consults a lawyer, but as no crime has been committed she is advised to consult a conman instead. She decides not to tell her father, who is dying of cancer. Her opponent is Fujisawa, her former middle-school teacher. Fujisawa suggests they are both being conned and should hide their money in his safety deposit box until the game is over. She is thrilled to have not been scammed but the next day she overhears Fujisawa bragging stealing her money was easy. Realizing he tricked her she begs help from legendary conman Akiyama, recently released from prison. Hearing about LGT, Akiyama helps confront Fujisawa. Fujisawa reveals he loves scamming idiots to benefit himself. Akiyama realizes day 30 is a Sunday when banks are closed, so Fujisawa will need to retrieve the cash on Friday and protect it until Sunday, giving Nao two days to steal it back. Akiyama offers to help as long as he is not asked to commit a crime, and for half the prize money.
| 2 | "Shockwave"; Transliteration: "Yusaburi" (Japanese: ゆさぶり) | Akiko Nakano & Kim Min-seon | Tatsuhiko Urahata | Yūzo Satō | April 14, 2026 |
Akiyama informs Nao to get the money she need only tell Fujisawa she plans to steal it, then surveil him constantly. After they tell Fujisawa, Akiyama rents an apartment opposite Fujisawa's house. As Fujisawa's stress from constant surveillance increases, he spends more time inside his house. With 16 days left Akiyama confirms from Fujisawa's unwillingness to leave the house that the money was never put in a bank but was inside the house all along. With 10 days left Fujisawa becomes sleep deprived so they fake a fire in his house to unsettle him. Furious, Fujisawa reveals the money is in a giant safe, but when Akiyama confidently claims he can open the safe Fujisawa begins to panic. With 4 days remaining the almost unhinged Fujisawa and Nao receive LGT letters confirming Fujisawa still possesses all ¥200 million. Nao starts to worry, but Akiyama remains confident. When only 1 hour remains Nao breaks down, rushes to Fujisawa's back garden and begs him to at least return her ¥100 million so neither of them lose. Fujisawa celebrates that Akiyama lied about being able to get into the safe and confidently ignores her. At 5 pm on the day the game ends, an LGT representative arrives to check and count the money to verify the winner.
| 3 | "Resolution"; Transliteration: "Kecchaku" (Japanese: 決着) | Asami Kawano & Kim Ki-nam | Tatsuhiko Urahata | Kenichi Shimizu | April 21, 2026 |
At 6 pm, three more LGT representatives arrive. The first LGT representative reveals he is Akiyama in disguise, and hands the money to Nao. Akiyama reveals that he placed a fake letter in Fujisawa letterbox stating the game ended at 5 pm, when it actually ended at 6 pm, and as Nao possessed the money at 6 pm, she is the winner. Nao pays Akiyama ¥50 million for helping her, but then she gives her ¥50 million to Fujisawa for his debts. Akiyama also donates his money to Fujisawa, who gratefully swears to become a better person. Nao finds another LGT letter informing her she must either play Round 2 or pay ¥50 million to quit, which she does not have anymore. Her lawyer advises threatening LGT with the police, so she goes to the LGT mansion. However, she discovers that her lawyer works for LGT and tricked her into coming, which counts as agreeing to play against twenty other Round 1 winners. Akiyama bursts in, having somehow gotten permission to play alongside her. Game Master Leronira announces all 22 players ID badges contain a pink diamond worth ¥100 million, and whoever gains all 22 diamonds will win ¥2.1 billion. To quit without playing will cost ¥100 million, which Nao does not have, but if they win the ¥2.1 billion and do not wish to play Round 3 they must pay ¥1.05 billion. The game is revealed as Minority Rule, where whoever has the fewest votes wins.
| 4 | "Minority Rule"; Transliteration: "Shōsūke" (Japanese: 少数決) | Kanji Wakabayashi, Ji Yang-ho & Hwang Il-jin | Tatsujiko Urahata | Yoshiaki Kawajiri | April 28, 2026 |
Leronira explains players will ask Yes/No questions, and whichever group is largest will lose. Akiyama demands LGT's motive, and Leronira claims LGT are seeking the Liar King. Akiyama explains he took the place of a woman who tried to pay to quit but accidentally gave her ¥100 million cheque to another player. During the demonstration, player 18 asks "Are you female?" As there are only 6 women Nao votes "Yes" since women are the minority, but 15 people vote "Yes", meaning she lost. Leronira reminds Nao it does not matter if her answer is truthful, only that she be in the minority. Akiyama plans to form an 8-person team, half voting "Yes" and half "No", meaning their team loses half their players per question, leaving 4, then 2, almost guaranteeing the winner is the final 1 from the 8. After the winner pays ¥1.05 billion to quit round 3, then ¥700 million for the other 7's debts, they would share the remaining ¥350 million, ¥43.75 million each. The problem is avoiding recruiting Player X, the one that stole the woman's cheque, since they can use that money to clear their own debt if they lose, making them a betrayal risk. As X was a younger man Nao chooses the other 5 women which includes Hitomi, and an elderly man named Matsubara.
| 5 | "Alliance"; Transliteration: "Dōmei" (Japanese: 同盟) | Akiko Nakano & Kim Min-sun | Tatsuhiko Urahata | Yoshiaki Kawajiri | May 5, 2026 (Note: Due to the broadcast of the 2026 World Team Table Tennis Championships, this episode aired at 1:30 a.m. JST, 1 hour and 30 minutes after the original air time on TV Tokyo.) |
The Team sign a contract to share the winnings. Nao explains about X. Hitomi believes X might be the suspicious Player 15. In Round One, Player 1 states baseball is better than soccer and Leronira asks everyone to agree Yes or disagree No. Ten vote Yes while twelve vote No and are disqualified. Among the survivors are Akiyama, Nao, Hitomi, Matsubara and 15. Akiyama is suspicious as the vote was 12/10, the closest possible vote to avoid a draw. For Round Two, Player 11 states he is a sadist, so Leronira asks players to vote Sadism Yes and Masochism No. Nao votes No with Matsubara while Akiyama votes Yes with Hitomi. The vote is four Yes against six No, also narrowly avoiding a draw, confirming something is suspicious. The four survivors are Akiyama, Hitomi, 15 and 11. Nao notices 1 still at the mansion despite being disqualified. For Round Three Hitomi states she will win, so Leronira asks them to vote Win Yes and Lose No. Hitomi votes Yes while 11 and 15 vote No. Per the plan, Nao assumes Akiyama voted No, meaning Hitomi has won for the Team. However, Hitomi reveals she is not Hitomi, she is X, a feminine man named Fuji who stole the invitation from his roommate Hitomi. This means Fuji has the cheque, the ¥2.1 billion and cannot be forced to share it since he signed Hitomi's name on the contract.
| 6 | "Initiative"; Transliteration: "Sente" (Japanese: 先手) | Takahiro Umehara | Tatsuhiko Urahata | Yoshiaki Kawajiri | May 12, 2026 |
Fuji reveals he simply formed the other fourteen players into two teams, making himself the eighth member of all three teams. This let him ensure every vote was almost a draw with himself in the minority. Leronira announces Akiyama's vote was actually Yes, resulting in a draw. Akiyama claims one person was obviously controlling everyone else with promises to share the money, as proven when 1 stayed at the mansion despite being disqualified. Plus, only Akiyama and X knew the stolen ¥100 million was a cheque instead of cash, and since Fuji knew about the cheque, he was obviously X. For Round Four, Akiyama states money is everything, then openly votes No. Akiyama explains for anyone else to win they must vote Yes, but if all three of them vote Yes Akiyama will win. Whereas if they want Akiyama to lose two of them must vote No, but this would mean losing alongside him. Then 15 asks Fuji and 11 to let him win, promising to advance to the next Stage so the prize for this Stage is the full ¥2.1 billion. However, he demands ¥230 million for himself and insists for betraying everyone Fuji will only get ¥1.25 million, plus the stolen cheque for his debt. Everyone else gets ¥143.75 million. Fuji refuses, so they agree to force a draw until they agree how to share the money. Subsequently, 15 votes No while 11 and Fuji vote Yes. Akiyama claims they fell for his trap.
| 7 | "The Loser's Revival"; Transliteration: "Haisha Fukkatsu" (Japanese: 敗者復活) | Kanji Wakabayashi & Kim Ki-nam | Tatsuhiko Urahata | Yoshiaki Kawajiri | May 19, 2026 |
Leronira reveals Yuji voted Yes, 11 Yes, Akiyama No and 15 Yes. Fuji and 11 are astounded 15 betrayed them. Akiyama reveals he told 15 Yuji was betraying everyone, so 15 became Akiyama's secret partner. Winning the entire ¥2.2 billion Akiyama pays ¥1.1625 billion to 15 for his teammates' debts plus some profit. With the remaining ¥1.0375 billion Akiyama covers the debts of their team, minus Fuji, and continues to Round Three so he can discover the people behind LGT. Nao walks away with ¥40 million but regrets Akiyama must play alone. Nao's former lawyer, Tanimura, explains Akiyama's mother was targeted by Shuei Group, a multi-level-marketing scam, and due to her naivete she failed to notice until she was ¥10 million in debt. Distraught, she killed herself so Akiyama could collect her life insurance. Akiyama trained as a con man and eventually bankrupted Shuei's owners, landing himself in prison for fraud. Tanimura invites Nao to Loser's Revival, where losers from Round Two can try to win money, promising if she wins Nao could pay for Akiyama to be dropped from Round Three. Nao attends Revival at a derelict bowling alley with eight players from Round Two who ended up in debt, including 11 and Fuji. Leronira announces the game is Downsizing. By the end there will be one loser and eight winners. Akiyama becomes worried Nao has stopped trying to contact him.
| 8 | "Downsizing Game"; Transliteration: "Risutora Gēmu" (Japanese: リストラゲーム) | Asami Kawano & Kim Min-seon | Tatsuhiko Urahata | Asami Kawano | May 26, 2026 |
The loser must pay ¥100 million, and winners receive ¥12.5 million. M-Tickets can be used to buy items from each other, but only items they brought with them. They are also given L-Tickets to cast 5 votes every hour for ten hours, for people they want to win. 11, aka Miura, informs Nao no one will vote for the treacherous Fuji. Fuji reveals Nao made ¥40 million in Round 2, making everyone hostile to Nao. In private Fuji reveals there are 450 votes available, and Nao and Fuji control 100, so if they vote for each other 50 times, they cannot be downsized. The others will be forced to trade for the remaining 350 votes until someone loses. Nao agrees but when the votes are revealed, Fuji has 10, everyone else has 5 and Nao has none, everyone having teamed up against her. Fuji laughs at Nao's naivety, as obviously he lied to her. Through votes two and three Nao remains at zero. Miura reveals Fuji told them Nao planned to use her ¥40 million to bribe someone. In exchange for ¥5 million of M Tickets from each player, Fuji offered to ensure Nao loses. Miura admits they all paid, and as M Tickets are enforceable, they must vote how Fuji wants until the tenth vote. Fuji beats up Miura for talking to Nao.
| 9 | "Light and Darkness"; Transliteration: "Hikari to Yami" (Japanese: 光と闇) | Akiko Nakano | Tatsuhiko Urahata & Kengo Son | Yūzo Satō | June 2, 2026 |
Fuji offers Nao a game; 30 votes against ¥30 million. Fuji places a double-sided black card and a Joker card in a bag and assigns Nao the Joker. Whichever card is drawn ten times first wins, but if a card is drawn face up the draw must be repeated. Nao loses and surrenders ¥30 million. Akiyama breaks in to help and realises a double-sided black card has no "face" and so cannot be drawn "face up", meaning there was a 94% chance of the Joker losing. Nao challenges Fuji to play again for 10 votes. Fuji agrees, but Nao wins by marking the black card with her fingernail to avoid drawing it. At vote six Fuji gives Nao ten votes. Nao approaches player Kikuzawa and reveals Fuji has ¥70 million to use in Round Three, so she offers him ¥70 million for 10 votes. Nao explains due to another player dropping out there is an open spot in Round Three, which Nao can claim if she has 20 votes. Kikuzawa agrees but after vote nine Nao suddenly has 80 votes, having made the same deal with every other player for 10 votes. With 40 votes, Fuji is now tied for last place with Kikuzawa and one other player.
| 10 | "Salvation"; Transliteration: "Kyūsai" (Japanese: 救済) | Kanji Wakabayashi & Kim Min-sun | Tatsuhiko Urahata & Kengo Son | Kenichi Shimizu | June 9, 2026 |
Akiyama points out Nao only needs 50 points to not lose, so he will be auctioning off the extra 30. Soon everyone is competing to buy votes and Nao ends up with the games entire ¥900 million. After the final vote, Leronira announces Nao has 51, everyone else has 50, and the loser is Miura with 49. Nao points out Miura was the only one to show her kindness, so she ensured he lost because she figured out how to beat Liar Game. The LGT lends each player ¥100 million per round, the winner takes some as their prize and the rest is safely returned to LGT, but LGT then earns profit from the debts of the losers. However, if the players collectively agree to let one player win everything in every round, the winner could pay everyone's debts straight away so LGT earns zero profits. Everyone is amazed Nao found a way to win by remaining honest. With ¥900 million, Nao pays Miura ¥200 million to escape the Liar Game debt free. The remaining ¥700 million she returns to the other seven players so they can enter Round Three no worse off than they were at the end of Round Two. Leronira is impressed Nao is smarter than he thought.
| 11 | "Contraband Game"; Transliteration: "Mitsuyu Gēmu" (Japanese: 密輸ゲーム) | Asami Kawano & Kim Ki-nam | Tatsuhiko Urahata | Yoshiaki Kawajiri | June 16, 2026 |
Leronira introduces Round Three, the Contraband Game. There are two warring countries, Day and Night. Players will alternate as smugglers and guards. The smugglers must get cash out of the enemy country in a briefcase and smuggle it across the border to their personal accounts in a neutral country. Each player has ¥300 million to smuggle from the enemy country and ¥100 million already in their personal account. Every smuggler can withdraw any amount from the ¥300 million or even leave the briefcase empty. At the border a guard will interview them in private to determine how much money they have and make an accusation. If the amount they guess is wrong, the guard must pay compensation of half the amount they guessed to the smuggler from their personal ¥100 million. After 50 rounds everyone may keep what they smuggled into their personal account but must return the ¥400 million they started the game with, so if they have less than ¥400 million in their personal account they will be in debt. Leronira reveals all nine of them are the Day team, as the Night team is another nine players who have earned their way to Round Three. Leronira and his counterpart Narco, note Fuji and Akiyama are the most intelligent, but Nao somehow keeps winning. Narco reveals his strongest player is Yokoya.
| 12 | "Yokoya"; Transliteration: "Yokoya" (Japanese: ヨコヤ) | Akiko Nakano & Kim Moon-su | Tatsuhiko Urahata | Yoshiaki Kawajiri | June 23, 2026 |
Nao claims they can win if everyone leaves their briefcases empty; it is impossible to lose money, and every time an inspector guesses wrong they will receive compensation. Fuji explains this is pointless because if no one smuggles anything, everyone will end up in debt. Akiyama volunteers as the next Inspector. When Night Smuggler arrives, Akiyama points out he dropped ¥10,000, causing the Smuggler to panic. Akiyama reveals the money is actually his, but the Smuggler's panic has proven his briefcase contains money. Akiyama correctly guesses ¥100 million, which is confiscated for Day Team. The next Night Inspector incorrectly guesses ¥50 million, and pays ¥25 million compensation. Nao notices the next Night Smuggler is ominous. Narco is impressed Nao identified Yokoya by instinct. Yokoya successfully smuggles ¥100 million. Fuji goes next with ¥50.01 million, reasoning no Inspector would guess such a random amount. She is surprised Yokoya appears and, claiming to be psychic, guesses ¥50.01 million. Yokoya begins appearing as the Inspector every time, correctly locating ¥50.02 million and ¥90.01 million. Akiyama goes next with an empty briefcase, but Yokoyo sees through this and declares "Pass". Kikuzawa volunteers as the next Inspector, preventing ¥100 million being smuggled. He reveals it is possible to win not by smuggling their own cash, but by confiscating Night Team's cash, as he has found a way of working out how much cash Night Team puts in their briefcases.
| 13 | "Fissures"; Transliteration: "Bunretsu" (Japanese: 分裂) | Kanji Wakabayashi | Tatsuhiko Urahata & Kengo Son | Yoshiawki Kawajiri | June 30, 2026 |
Kikuzawa exploits a rule where guessing more than the amount in the briefcase still confiscates all of it. By consistently guessing ¥100 million, he guarantees confiscation while minimizing the risk of paying compensation. Next, Nao smuggles a teddy bear, exposing that Yokoya's clairvoyance is fake when he guesses her case is empty. During this, Yokoya argues the Liar Game is about controlling others, while Nao believes it teaches victory through honesty. Kikuzawa selfishly keeps his method to himself while paying players to obey him, a manipulation Nao realizes aligns with Yokoya's claims about control. As Rounds progress, Kikuzawa confiscates more cash while Yokoya correctly identifies Day Team's empty cases. After Kikuzawa fakes illness, his substitute Eda loses ¥100 million to Yokoya. Akiyama calculates Kikuzawa and Yokoya have confiscated around ¥290 million each and deduces Kikuzawa's method and Yokoya's clairvoyance are connected. Predicting Kikuzawa will force the next Day Smuggler to carry cash, Akiyama secretly instructs the Smuggler to alter the amount without telling Kikuzawa. Kikuzawa insists on smuggling ¥91.11 million and Yokoya guesses ¥91.11 million, when the Smuggler was actually carrying ¥91.12 million. Their scheme exposed, Akiyama reveals Kikuzawa and Yokoya have been colluding since Round Four, signalling each other through the windows. Kikuzawa confesses Yokoya was his high school bully, who still controls him through fear.
| 14 | "Dictatorship"; Transliteration: "Dokusai" (Japanese: 独裁) | Asami Kawano & Ji Yang-ho | Tatsuhiko Urahata & Kengo Son | Hiroshi Kōjina | July 7, 2026 |
Kikuzawa reveals Yokoya, a wealthy CEO's son, transferred to his high school and outsmarted bullies by filming them stealing his money. Under threat of arrest, the bullies obeyed him, allowing Yokoya to rule the school. He implemented a violent ranking system, forcing students to desperately avoid a low rank by bribing the bullies or reporting on people who criticised Yokoya. Kikuzawa believes Yokoya already controls Night Country. When the Day Team tries to assault Kikuzawa for his betrayal, Nao convinces them to divide Kikuzawa's ¥290 million as a fine, realizing Yokoya intended for the team to self-destruct through infighting. When Yokoya stops inspecting, the Day Team takes the lead with ¥1.651 billion to Night Team's ¥1.319 billion. However, nervous Day Team members begin smuggling empty briefcases, earning nothing. Leronira and Akiyama warn that winning does not guarantee profit. Akiyama explains that cash they smuggle is withdrawn from the opposing team's ATM. Winnings are calculated based on smuggled amounts, remaining ATM balances, and the ability to repay the initial ¥3.6 billion loaned to them by LGT for this game. Because of this formula, even if the Day Team wins by smuggling more cash out of the Night Team ATM, the Night Team will retain enough money in the Day Team ATM to clear their debts and profit. Meanwhile, the victorious Day Team would be the ones left in debt.
| 15 | "Secret Plan"; Transliteration: "Himitsu Keikaku" (Japanese: 秘密計画) | Akiko Nakano & Kim Min-sun | Tatsuhiko Urahata | Kenichi Shimizu | July 14, 2026 |
Akiyama arrives late to inspection, having used the time to deduce key ATM mechanics: player bank cards can also deposit cash and withdraw past the briefcase ¥100million limit. It is even possible to use another players card, though any cash or compensation received for that Round will go to the card owner. He proposes a plan to withdraw the Night ATM's entire ¥2.3 billion, leave it by the Day ATM, and have a Night traitor deposit it in the Day ATM, allowing his team to lose the game but walk away with the cash. However, Akiyama suspects Yokoya also has a plan due to a sudden change in the play order of Night team smugglers. Tsunoda, Eda, and Kitayama guiltily confess to Nao and Fuji that in the last three Rounds Night players claiming to want to betray Yokoya told them the exact same plan Akiyama just proposed, and convinced them to smuggle a staggering ¥1.91billion into the Night ATM. With this, the Night ATM now holds a massive ¥4.22 billion, practically securing Yokoya's victory with 30 rounds still left to play.
| 16 | "Turbulence"; Transliteration: "Ranryū" (Japanese: 乱流) | Kanji Wakabayashi & Kim Ki-nam | Tatsuhiko Urahata & Kengo Son | Kenichi Shimizu | July 21, 2026 |
Furious at their seemingly unwinnable situation, Fuji's group confesses to Akiyama. Sensing their genuine guilt, Akiyama forgives them and unveils a rescue plan. He confronts the Night smuggler they call "Bandana", who tricked Eda, falsely claiming the Day Team hid the smuggled ¥1.91 billion instead of depositing it. Since the three Night smugglers withdrew the cash, they remain personally liable for paying it back after Round 50. Desperate to avoid such a huge debt, Bandana reveals Yokoya ruthlessly dominated in the Downsizing Game, placing the entire Night Team in debt to him for ¥200 million each. Akiyama counters by showing how Nao's honest approach benefited everyone on the Day Team, successfully convincing Bandana to betray Yokoya. To drain their funds quickly, Akiyama orders his team to smuggle ¥100 million per round and have it confiscated by intentionally getting caught, then when the Night Team smuggle empty briefcases make false ¥100 million accusations and pay ¥50 million penalties. Within seven rounds, this will shift the cash balance to the Night ATM. Then when Bandana and his accomplices smuggle back the ¥1.91 billion, Yokoya will have no time to recover. However, Yokoya quickly grows suspicious.
| 17 | "Tip-Off"; Transliteration: "Kujō" (Japanese: 苦情) | Asami Kawano & Kim Mun-su | Tatsuhiko Urahata & Kengo Son | Asami Kawano | July 28, 2026 |
Akiyama recruits Long Hair, the second "Night" traitor. Bandana explains that Yokoya controls Night team through a points-based loyalty system: points are earned through obedience and deducted through disobedience or failure to smuggle cash. Only the top six scorers will win a share of the cash, while the bottom two receive nothing and remain ¥200million in debt to Yokoya. This forces everyone to distrust each other and obey Yokoya out of fear. Akiyama hopes uniting the three traitors will spark a rebellion. Though account balances temporarily equalize, the next Night Inspector accuses for ¥99.99 million instead of ¥100 million, widening the gap in the accounts by ¥300 million. Fearing Yokoya has caught on, Day team panics. Yokoya restrains Bandana and Long Hair, offering a reward to whoever confesses first and punishment to the other. Inspired by Akiyama's faith in Nao, Bandana stays silent. However, Yokoya reveals Long Hair confessed almost immediately. To test the accuracy of his confession, Yokoya sends Baldy, Akiyama's next traitor target, to see if he gets recruited. When Baldy confirms Akiyama approached him, Yokoya devises a counter-plan, and demands Bandana redeem himself by tricking Akiyama.
| 18 | "Caution"; Transliteration: "Keikoku" (Japanese: 警告) | Akiko Nakano & Ji Yang-ho | Tatsuhiko Urahata | Aimi Yamauchi | August 4, 2026 |
Yokoya reveals the missing ¥1.91 billion cash was supposed to be smuggled into Nao's account via her hidden ATM card. To counter this, Yokoya orders Bandana to pretend to cooperate, hide the physical cash with the Night Team, and falsely assure Akiyama the money was deposited into Nao's account. Yokoya expects Akiyama to request more cash movements to secure a profit, allowing the Night Team to hide those funds too. When Bandana signals Akiyama for the card's location, Akiyama initially refuses, citing suspicion of Yokoya's motives. Unsure of Bandana's loyalty, Yokoya sends Baldy instead. Akiyama reveals the location, and Baldy brings the ¥1.91 billion directly to Yokoya without depositing it in Nao's account. However, Akiyama surprisingly asks for no further cash movements, nor does Nao when she faces Baldy in Round 31. Yokoya assumes the Day Team is now trying to lose because they mistakenly believe they are in profit, unaware the Night Team has hidden the cash. By the end of Day Two, the Night Team leads with ¥1.77 billion against the Day Team's ¥1.65 billion. Confident yet unsettled by Akiyama's demeanour, Yokoya elects to play all remaining rounds as both Smuggler and Inspector, matched by Nao for the Day Team until Round 50 concludes.
| 19 | "Solidarity"; Transliteration: "Rentai" (Japanese: 連帯) | Kanji Wakabayashi & Kim Min-sun | Tatsuhiko Urahata | Yūzo Satō | August 11, 2026 |
Night Team doubts Yokoya's plan when calculations show neither side making a profit. Yokoya reveals he is secretly depositing the stolen physical cash into his personal account so it appears legitimate when he withdraws and smuggles it into the Day ATM. When the game ends, the scoreboard initially shows Night Team winning with ¥2.37 billion to Day Team's ¥1.48 billion. However, auditing the physical cash not in the ATM's exposes the discrepancy: in reality Night Team's accounts are completely empty, while Day Team holds ¥3.35 billion. Consequently, Day Team wins, leaving Night Team deeper in debt and forced to proceed to Game Four. Akiyama reveals his scheme: Baldy, Bandana, and Long Hair remained allied traitors even after Yokoya forced Long Hair to confess. With Akiyama's technical help manipulating the ATM cards, Baldy withdrew ¥1.91 billion from the Day ATM and presented it in cash to Yokoya as though it was Night ATM funds. Thus, Yokoya's smuggling yielded nothing because the Night ATM remained empty while the cash was funnelled back into the Day ATM. Day Team secures ¥1.23 billion in profit, enabling the three traitors to leave the Liar Game debt-free. Although Yokoya gloats that this isn't enough to clear everyone's debts, Akiyama and Nao use their own winnings from previous games and also refuse to repay what they owe LGT from this game, intentionally becoming ¥400 million in debt each in order to clear everyone else's debts. Thus they continue to the next Loser's Revival to continue their fight against LGT.
| 20 | "Provocation"; Transliteration: "Chōhatsu" (Japanese: 挑発) | Asami Kawano & Park Si-hoo | Tatsuhiko Urahata | Yūzo Satō | August 18, 2026 |
Narco reveals player winnings: Nao gets ¥100M, Akiyama ¥422M, other Day players ¥472M each, and most Night players ¥100M–¥240M. Yokoya gloats over taking ¥1.03B by secretly depositing Night players' smuggled cash into his own account, making him the only major profit-maker while everyone else remains in debt. Nao mocks Yokoya, pointing out he was outwitted twice by Akiyama, betrayed by three teammates, and left his loyalists in worse debt. Furious, Yokoya leaves. Nao admits to Akiyama she provoked Yokoya so he would enter the fourth game so they can take his ¥1B. Akiyama regrets letting Yokoya steal the money, questioning his obsession with ending the LGT. Nao and Akiyama register for the Loser's Revival, joined by Kota (Bandana) and Fuji who seeks revenge on Yokoya. A week later, Tanimoto tells Nao the Revival is a 3v3 match between the East team (Nao, Akiyama, Fuji) and West team (Nishida, Kikuchi, Kosaka) at an abandoned middle school library. Host Solario lends each player ¥150M in chips, noting the LGT requires ¥100M returned per player, allowing everyone to profit ¥50M if they cooperate, but worsening debts for those under ¥100M. Players must decide to become either Spearheads, Cores or Generals. Team profits and losses are shared equally across three isolated 1v1 matches. Fuji faces Nishida as Spearhead, Akiyama faces Kikuchi as Core, and Nao faces Kosaka as General. Solario announces the first Spearhead game: 24 Chamber Russian Roulette.
| 21 | "Spearhead Match"; Transliteration: "Senpō-sen" (Japanese: 先鋒戦) | Akiko Nakano & Yang Joung-hee | Tatsuhiko Urahata | Kenichi Shimizu | August 25, 2026 |
Solario explains the 24-chamber gun contains 6 blank bullets, where firing a bullet forfeits 50 chips (¥50 million). Players can pass by doubling chip bets until someone must shoot. Empty chambers award accumulated pass chips; bullets forfeit them alongside the 50-chip penalty. Following Akiyama's test-round strategy of tracking bullet locations after the first shot, Fuji faces Nishida in the first game. Fuji aggressively passes, intimidating Nishida into passing, before taking empty shots herself to claim his chips. Akiyama reveals Fuji's strategy leverages gravity: spinning the cylinder places the heavier half of the cylinder with the most bullets at the bottom away from the barrel, meaning the first six chambers are almost certainly empty. Akiyama has also leaked false advice to the opposition to load bullets consecutively, increasing the weight on one side of the cylinder. By Round 5, Fuji leads by 70 chips. She shifts tactics as chamber 6 and onwards are increasingly likely to contain bullets, leading Nishida to shoot himself in Round 6 and forfeit 50 chips. During a break after Round 9, Fuji admits to Nao she used eyeliner to fake gunpowder marks over six chambers, tricking Nishida into thinking he located all bullets starting from chamber 14. As Fuji returns for Round 10, Nao realizes too late that Fuji is about to fall for Nishida's trap.
| 22 | "Trap"; Transliteration: "Wana" (Japanese: 罠) | Kanji Wakabayashi & Kang Tae-sik | Tatsuhiko Urahata & Kengo Son | Yūzo Satō | September 1, 2026 |
Nao realizes LGT is exploiting them: if both players continuously pass by forfeiting chips the LGT collects ¥310 million in forfeits by the time all six bullets are fired, adding ¥5 million to both player's existing debts. In Round 13, Fuji fires an empty chamber to gain 57 chips, and in Round 15, Nishida fires a bullet, losing 50 chips. During a timeout, Fuji reveals she tricked Nishida into taking chamber 15 by letting him believe the next bullet was in chamber 21. Nao asks Fuji to shoot herself with the final two bullets to prevent further forfeits, securing a final ¥838 million profit to clear Nishida's team's debt while advancing Nao, Akiyama, and Fuji to defeat Yokoya. When Fuji refuses, Nao falsely claims her plan will earn Fuji more money. Fuji begrudgingly shoots herself with the bullets in chambers 16 and 17 to force a tie. Though angry to discover Nao lied, Fuji accepts lying is within the rules but vows revenge if Akiyama loses the Core game. Solario announces the Core game: Seventeen Poker, played using only Aces, Kings, Queens, Jacks and the single Joker, which can become any of the other cards for a potential five of a kind hand.
| 23 | "Core Match"; Transliteration: "Chūken-sen" (Japanese: 中堅戦) | Asami Kawano & Ryu Seung-cheol | Tatsuhiko Urahata & Kengo Son | Ichizō Kobayashi | September 8, 2026 |
During the practice round, Nao despairs when her Two-Pair loses to Kikuchi's Three-of-a-Kind. However, the dealer clarifies that overall chip count after ten rounds determines the victor, not total round wins. In the first official round, Akiyama draws a Joker-assisted Straight-Flush. Recognizing that keeping all five cards would make Kikuchi suspicious enough to fold immediately without betting, Akiyama strategically discards three cards while retaining the Joker and Ace. This trick keeps Kikuchi betting while guaranteeing Akiyama at least a Three-of-a-Kind hand, securing him another 25 chips. Akiyama repeats his success to win 25 more chips in round two. During a timeout, Kikuchi reveals his secret strategy to his team: exceptional kinetic vision. By tracking the decks initial card order during shuffles, he can follow the top card, the Joker, and bottom card, the Ace of Spades, to manipulate cuts, guaranteeing those specific cards are dealt to him. Capitalizing on this skill in round three, Kikuchi secures both the Ace and Joker to win with a Full House. Solario eagerly anticipates watching Akiyama lose.
| 24 | "Counterattack"; Transliteration: "Gyakushū" (Japanese: 逆襲) | Kim Hyeon-jeon & Kim Moon-su | Tatsuhiko Urahata | Kim Hyeon-jeong | September 15, 2026 |
Using his method, Kikuchi puts his team in the lead with the most chips by round six. Akiyama announces he knows Kikuchi can see the Joker. Nao panics and calls a timeout to reveal LGT is manipulating them into debt, proposing a truce so Kikuchi's team can leave debt-free. Nishida wants to accept, but Kikuchi and Kosaka refuse. In round seven, Kikuchi exploits Akiyama’s goal of avoiding losing chips to the dealer, winning 50 chips with a Joker-assisted Four-of-a-Kind. Fuji blames Nao for exposing their strategy. Deciding Kikuchi is beyond saving, Akiyama resolves to crush him. In round eight, Akiyama claims Kikuchi tracks cards via the dealer's Hindu shuffle and requests a Riffle shuffle instead. Kikuchi agrees, confident he can still win. However, Akiyama makes large bets and nonsensical cuts, securing a Joker-assisted Four-of-a-Kind to beat Kikuchi’s Full-House for 70 chips. In round nine, Akiyama insists on double-shuffling. Kikuchi draws a Joker-assisted Aces-High Full-House, but Akiyama discards all his cards for five new ones, draws an immediate Four-of-a-Kind, and reclaims the lead in number of chips. In the final round, Akiyama requests four shuffles. Kikuchi draws another Joker-assisted Aces-High Full-House. Though nervous when Akiyama discards his entire hand again, Kikuchi places the maximum bet and gloats prematurely, revealing Akiyama was right about his ability to track the Joker.
| 25 | "General Match"; Transliteration: "Taishō-sen" (Japanese: 大将戦) | Yūzo Satō & Kim Ki-nam | Tatsuhiko Urahata | Ichizō Kobayashi | September 22, 2026 |
Akiyama beats Kikuchi’s Aces-High Full-House with four Queens, winning the Core Game. He explains that while Kikuchi tracked the Joker, he tracked all 17 cards. Recognizing the dealer's perfect riffle shuffles, Akiyama requested two consecutive shuffles to manipulate the deck, guaranteeing there would be a Four-of-a-Kind among the undealt cards, which he then drew by discarding his entire first hand. The dealer announces the General Game, Stationary Roulette: a non-spinning wheel where players take turns dropping a ball into a hidden four-pocket chamber and bet on which pocket they chose. The non-dealer must deduce if the dealer bet truthfully on the correct pocket, or bet dishonestly to try and make them bet incorrectly. Akiyama worries as Nao is playing, and she panics under pressure and lies poorly. In round one, dealer Kosaka bets 40 chips and falsely claims the ball is in Pocket 1. Nao trusts her and also bets 40 on Pocket 1, but Kosaka lied as the ball lands in Pocket 4, winning her 40 of Nao's chips. Panicking, Nao bets 100 chips as dealer but her nervousness betrays she placed the ball in Pocket 3. Kosaka bets 100 on Pocket 3 and wins, getting back her 100 chips plus 60 of Nao's. Kosaka gloats over easily outplaying Nao. Fuji remains confident, having secretly primed Kosaka's subconscious to choose 3 before the game even started.
| 26 | "Determination"; Transliteration: "Ketsui" (Japanese: 決意) | Asami Kawano & Kim Min-sun | Tatsuhiko Urahata | Yūzo Sato & Asami Kawano | September 29, 2026 |
A flashback reveals Fuji offered Kosaka winning advice in exchange for ¥300 million of her prize. After signing the contract, Fuji claimed Nao blinks when lying, which allowed Kosaka to correctly identify Pocket 3 in round two. In round three, both bet correctly on pocket two, letting Nao win back 34 chips. Believing Nao is an incompetent liar, Kosaka finds it hilarious when Nao bets 90 chips per pocket (360 total). Spotting Nao blinking, Kosaka places 360 chips on Pocket 2. Kosaka recalls losing her father's company after his death when trusted associates exploited her ignorance, bankrupting her within a year. The dealer reveals the ball was actually in Pocket 3, Fuji having made up Nao's blinking to manipulate Kosaka. Kosaka is left with just 88 chips, meaning even if she wins all remaining rounds she would only have a maximum of 352 chips versus Nao's 476. Forced to concede, Kosaka is stunned when Nao keeps her promise and pays their debts. Akiyama scolds Nao for going along with Fuji, but Nao believes Fuji prioritizes her rematch with Yokoya, and may also harbour a secret crush on Akiyama. Covering the debts of Kosaka, Kikuchi, Nishida, and Fuji leaves Nao and Akiyama ¥100 million deeper in debt each. Akiyama explains he forced a tie in the Spearhead match because if Nao absorbs the debts of all other players, her inability to pay any of it back will force LGT into bankruptcy. Elsewhere, Yokoya eagerly anticipates the rematch.

== See also ==
- Gambling in Japan
- Squid Game, a 2021 South Korean television show influenced by Liar Game
