= Kosuke Suzuki =

Japanese actor (born 1974)

- 鈴木 浩介
- Born: 29 November 1974 (age 51); Yahatanishi-ku, Kitakyūshū, Fukuoka Prefecture, Japan
- Education: Aoyama Gakuin University Faculty of Business Department of Management
- Occupation: Actor
- Years active: 1997–present
- Agent: Sis Company
- Style: Television drama; theatre; film
- Television: Koi ni ochitara: Boku no Seikō no Himitsu; Liar Game; The Negotiator; Akutō: Jū Hanzai Sōsahan; Waratte Iitomo!
- Spouse: Chihiro Otsuka (m. 2015)
- Children: 2
- Website: Official profile

Kosuke Suzuki (鈴木 浩介, Suzuki Kōsuke; born 29 November 1974, in Yahatanishi-ku, Kitakyūshū, Fukuoka Prefecture) is a Japanese actor. He is represented with Sis Company. His wife is actress Chihiro Otsuka.

== Biography ==
Suzuki graduated from Seinan Gakuin High School and Aoyama Gakuin University Faculty of Business Department of Management. He joined athletics when he was in high school, and had experience running short distance races at the national Inter-High School Championships.

Suzuki greatly admired the actor Toshiyuki Nishida, and even took a leave from the university to enter the Seinenza acting school, the troupe Nishida belonged to. He later officially joined Seinenza Theater Company in 1997. He later left in 2004 after Nishida left the company. Suzuki continued by acting in television dramas.

In 2007 he played Yuji Fukunaga in Liar Game and gained popularity due to his lines. Suzuki's character in the series is also known for his mushroom hair, black eyeglasses, loud speech, abuse of others, and the intensity of his character. Suzuki commented that the character was tiring. Perhaps because of the popularity of that character, he later performed a similar role in Flight Panic.

In his private life Suzuki dated Seven Detectives co-star Chihiro Otsuka in July 2015 and they later married on 7 October.

== Filmography ==
=== TV drama ===
Year	Title	Role	Notes	Ref.
2007–10	Liar Game	Yuji Fukunaga	2 seasons	
2012–21	Doctor-X: Surgeon Michiko Daimon	Mamoru Hara	7 seasons	
2014–25	Emergency Interrogation Room	Daijiro Kenmotsu	5 seasons	
2015	Seven Detectives	Keita Nagasawa		
2015	Family Fortune War	Masaru Yahata		
2020	The Way of the Househusband	Yoshiki Chigira	Episode 3	
2021	Life's Punchline	Kensuke Makabe		
2022	Don't Call It Mystery	Haruo Amatasu		
2022	The Forbidden Magic	Jinsaku Ōga	TV movie	
2022–23	Maiagare!	Shingo Ura	Asadora	
2023	Trillion Game	Toru Hebijima		
2023	Rebooting	Mita Tetsuo		
2024	GTO Revival			
2025	Dr. Ashura	Matayoshi Kongō		
2025	Scandal Eve	Tsutomu Tozaki		

=== Films ===
Year	Title	Role	Notes	Ref.
2010	Liar Game: The Final Stage	Yuji Fukunaga		
2012	Liar Game: Reborn	Yuji Fukunaga		
2020	Masked Ward	Kanemoto		
2023	Analog	Shuzo Iwamoto		
2024	Doctor-X: The Movie	Mamoru Hara		
2025	Trillion Game	Toru Hebijima		
2025	Emergency Interrogation Room: The Final Movie	Daijiro Kenmotsu		
2026	Until We Meet Again	Yuji Shimizu		

=== Japanese dub ===
Year	Title	Role	Voice dub for	Ref.
2004	Lost in Translation	John	Giovanni Ribisi	

=== Advertisements ===
Year	Title	Notes	Ref.
2015	Toyota TNGA Story	As Meguro	
