= List of live-action films based on cartoons and comics =

This is a list of live action theatrical, television, or direct-to-video/DVD films that were based on cartoons and comics:

== 0-9 ==
- 101 Dalmatians (1996)
- 102 Dalmatians (2000)
- 300 (2006)
- 300: Rise of an Empire (2014)

== A ==
- Ace Attorney (2012)
- The Addams Family (1991)
- Addams Family Values (1993)
- Addams Family Reunion (1998)
- Adventures of Captain Marvel (1941)
- The Adventures of Rocky and Bullwinkle (2000)
- Æon Flux (2005)
- Aladdin (2019)
- Alice in Wonderland (2010)
- Alice Through the Looking Glass (2016)
- Alita: Battle Angel (2019)
- Alvin and the Chipmunks (2007)
- Alvin and the Chipmunks: The Squeakquel (2009)
- Alvin and the Chipmunks: Chipwrecked (2011)
- Alvin and the Chipmunks: The Road Chip (2015)
- The Amazing Spider-Man (2012)
- The Amazing Spider-Man 2 (2014)
- American Splendor (2003)
- Annie (1982)
- Annie (1999)
- Annie (2014)
- Antique (2008)
- Ant-Man (2015)
- Ant-Man and the Wasp (2018)
- Ant-Man and the Wasp: Quantumania (2023)
- Aquaman (2018)
- Aquaman and the Lost Kingdom (2023)
- Archie: To Riverdale and Back Again (1990)
- The Archies (2023)
- Assassination Classroom (2015)
- Assassination Classroom: Graduation (2016)
- Asterix film series (1967-2023)
- Atom Man vs. Superman (1950)
- Atomic Blonde (2017)
- Attack on Titan (2015)
- Asura Girl: Blood-C Another Story (2017)
- The Avengers (2012)
- Avengers: Age of Ultron (2015)
- Avengers: Infinity War (2018)
- Avengers: Endgame (2019)
- Avengers: Doomsday (2026)

== B ==
- Baby Huey's Great Easter Adventure (1999)
- Bakuman (2015)
- Barbarella (1968)
- Barbie (2023)
- Batman (1943)
- Batman & Robin (1949)
- Batman (1966)
- Batman (1989)
- Batman Returns (1992)
- Batman Forever (1995)
- Batman & Robin (1997)
- The Batman (2022)
- Batman Begins (2005)
- Batman v Superman: Dawn of Justice (2016)
- Beauty and the Beast (2017)
- Ben 10: Race Against Time (2007)
- Ben 10: Alien Swarm (2009)
- Der bewegte Mann (1994)
- Birds of Prey (2020)
- Blackhawk (1952)
- Black Adam (2022)
- Black Butler (2014)
- Black Panther (2018)
- Black Panther: Wakanda Forever (2022)
- Black Widow (2021)
- Blade (1998)
- Blade II (2002)
- Blade: Trinity (2004)
- Blade of the Immortal (2017)
- Bleach (2018)
- Blondie film series
- Bloodshot (2020)
- Blue Beetle (2023)
- Blue’s Big City Adventure (2022)
- Boris and Natasha: The Movie (1992)
- Buck Rogers (1939)
- Buck Rogers in the 25th Century (1979)
- Bumblebee (2018)

== C ==
- Captain America (1944)
- Captain America (1979)
- Captain America (1990)
- Captain America II: Death Too Soon (1979)
- Captain America: Brave New World (2025)
- Captain America: Civil War (2016)
- Captain America: The First Avenger (2011)
- Captain America: The Winter Soldier (2014)
- Captain Marvel (2019)
- Casper (1995)
- Casper: A Spirited Beginning (1997)
- Casper Meets Wendy (1998)
- Casshern (2004)
- Catwoman (2004)
- Charlie and the Chocolate Factory (2005)
- Charlotte's Web (2006)
- Chihayafuru Part 1 (2016)
- Chihayafuru: Shimo no Ku (2016)
- Chihayafuru: Musubi (2018)
- Chip 'n Dale: Rescue Rangers (2022)
- Christopher Robin (2018)
- Cinderella (2015)
- Clifford The Big Red Dog (2021)
- Clifford The Big Red Dog 2 (TBA)
- Congo Bill (1948)
- Constantine (2005)
- Coyote vs. Acme (2026)
- The Crow film series
- Cruella (2021)

== D ==
- Daphne & Velma (2018)
- Daredevil (2003)
- Dariya Dil (1988)
- The Dark Knight (2008)
- The Dark Knight Rises (2012)
- Dark Phoenix (2019)
- Dasepo Naughty Girls (2006)
- Deadpool (2016)
- Deadpool 2 (2018)
- Deadpool & Wolverine (2024)
- Death Note (2006)
- Death Note 2: The Last Name (2006)
- Death Note: Light Up the New World (2016)
- Death Note (2017)
- The Death of the Incredible Hulk (1990)
- The Death of Stalin (2017)
- Dennis the Menace (1993)
- Dennis the Menace Strikes Again (1998)
- 3 Dev Adam (1973)
- Diabolik (1968)
- The Diary of a Teenage Girl (2015)
- Dick Tracy (1937)
- Dick Tracy vs. Crime, Inc. (1941)
- Dick Tracy (1945)
- Dick Tracy (1990)
- Dondi (1961)
- Dr. Strange (TV, 1978)
- Doctor Strange (2016)
- Doctor Strange in the Multiverse of Madness (2022)
- Dora and the Lost City of Gold (2019)
- Dora and the Search for Sol Dorado (2025)
- Dragonball: Evolution (2009)
- Dredd (2012)
- Dudley Do-Right (1999)
- Dumbo (2019)

== E ==
- Elektra (2005)
- Eternals (2021)
- El Muerto (TBA)

== F ==
- The Fairly OddParents film series
- Fantastic Four (2005)
- Fantastic Four (2015)
- The Fantastic Four: First Steps (2025)
- Fantastic Four: Rise of the Silver Surfer (2007)
- Fat Albert (2004)
- Fatty Finn (1980)
- Fireman Sam in Action (1996)
- The Flash (2023)
- Flash Gordon (1936)
- Flash Gordon (1980)
- Flash Gordon's Trip to Mars (1938)
- Flash Gordon Conquers the Universe (1940)
- The Flintstones (1994)
- The Flintstones in Viva Rock Vegas (2000)
- Friday Foster (1975)
- From Hell (2001)
- From Me to You (2010)
- Fullmetal Alchemist (2017)

== G ==
- Garfield: The Movie (2004)
- Garfield: A Tail of Two Kitties (2006)
- Gatchaman (2013)
- Generation X (TV, 1996)
- George of the Jungle (1997)
- George of the Jungle 2 (direct-to-video, 2003)
- Green Lantern (2011)
- Green Lantern Corps (TBA)
- Ghost in the Shell (2017)
- Ghost Rider (2007)
- Ghost Rider: Spirit of Vengeance (2011)
- Ghost World (2001)
- G.I. Joe film series
- Gintama (2017)
- Grand Blue (2020)
- Guardians of the Galaxy (2014)
- Guardians of the Galaxy Vol. 2 (2017)
- Guardians of the Galaxy Vol. 3 (2023)

== H ==
- Halloween with the New Addams Family (1977)
- Harold and the Purple Crayon (2024)
- Hellboy (2004)
- Hellboy (2019)
- Hellboy: The Crooked Man (2024)
- Hellboy II: The Golden Army (2008)
- A History of Violence (2005)
- How the Grinch Stole Christmas (2000)
- How to Train Your Dragon (2025)
- Howard the Duck (1986)
- Hulk (2003)
- The Hunchback of Notre Dame (TBA)

== I ==
- The Incredible Hulk (2008)
- The Incredible Hulk Returns (TV, 1988)
- Initial D (2005)
- Inspector Gadget (1999)
- Inspector Gadget 2 (direct-to-video, 2003)
- Iron Man (2008)
- Iron Man 2 (2010)
- Iron Man 3 (2013)

== J ==
- Jem and the Holograms (2015)
- Joker (2019)
- Joker: Folie à Deux (2024)
- Jonah Hex (2010)
- Josie and the Pussycats (2001)
- Judge Dredd (1995)
- The Jungle Book (2016)
- The Jungle Book 2 (TBA)
- Justice League (2017)
- Zack Snyder's Justice League (2021)
- Justice League of America (1997)

== K ==
- Kingsman film series
- Kick-Ass (2010)
- Kick-Ass 2 (2013)
- Kim Possible (2019)
- Kingdom (2019)
- The Kitchen (2019)
- Kite (2014)
- Knights of the Zodiac (2023)
- Kraven the Hunter (2024)

== L ==
- L: Change the World (2008)
- Lady and the Tramp (2019)
- The Last Airbender (2010)
- The League of Extraordinary Gentlemen (2003)
- Let Me Eat Your Pancreas (2017)
- Li'l Abner (1940)
- Li'l Abner (1959)
- Little Orphan Annie (1932)
- Little Orphan Annie (1938)
- Lilo & Stitch (2025)
- The Little Mermaid (2023)
- The Lion King (2019)
- Logan (2017)
- A Loud House Christmas (2021)
- A Really Haunted Loud House (2023)
- Looney Tunes: Back in Action (2003)
- Lupin III: Strange Psychokinetic Strategy (1974)

== M ==
- Madame Web (2024)
- Madeline (1998)
- Maleficent (2014)
- Maleficent: Mistress of Evil (2019)
- Maleficent 3 (TBA)
- Man of Steel (2013)
- Man-Thing (2005)
- Marmaduke (2010)
- The Marvels (2023)
- The Mask (1994)
- Masters of the Universe (1987)
- Masters of the Universe (2026)
- Max Steel (2016)
- The Mean One (2022)
- Men in Black film series
- The Mouse Trap (2024)
- Monster High: The Movie (2022)
- Monster High 2 (2023)
- Morbius (2022)
- Mr. Magoo (1997)
- Mufasa: The Lion King (2024)
- Mulan (2020)
- Mutt and Jeff series (1911-1913)
- Mystery Men (1999)

== N ==
- Nana (2005)
- The New Mutants (2020)
- Nick Fury: Agent of S.H.I.E.L.D. (1998)
- Nicky Larson et le Parfum de Cupidon (2019)

== O ==
- Office Space (1999)
- Old Bill and Son (1941)
- Old (2021)
- Oldboy (2003)
- Oldboy (2013)
- Once Upon A Deadpool (2018)

== P ==
- Painkiller Jane (2005)
- Parasyte: Part 1 (2014)
- Parasyte:Part 2 (2015)
- Pete's Dragon (2016)
- Peter Pan & Wendy (2023)
- Peter Rabbit (2018)
- Peter Rabbit 2: The Runaway (2021)
- The Phantom (1943)
- The Phantom (1996)
- Paddington (2014)
- Paddington 2 (2017)
- Paddington in Peru (2024)
- Pinocchio (2022)
- Pokémon: Detective Pikachu (2019)
- Popeye (1980)
- The Punisher (1989)
- The Punisher (2004)
- Punisher: War Zone (2008)

== R ==
- Red (2010)
- Red 2 (2013)
- The Return of Swamp Thing (1989)
- Riki-Oh: The Story of Ricky (1991)
- Road to Perdition (2002)
- The Rocketeer (1991)
- Rurouni Kenshin (2012)
- Rurouni Kenshin: Kyoto Inferno (2014)
- Rurouni Kenshin: The Legend Ends (2014)
- Rurouni Kenshin: The Final (2021)
- Rurouni Kenshin: The Beginning (2021)

== S ==
- Sabrina the Teenage Witch (1996)
- Sabrina Goes to Rome (1998)
- Sabrina Down Under (1999)
- The Sad Sack (1957)
- Scooby-Doo film series
- Scott Pilgrim vs. the World (2010)
- The Shadow (1940)
- The Shadow (1994)
- Shang-Chi and the Legend of the Ten Rings (2021)
- Shazam! (2019)
- Shazam! Fury of the Gods (2023)
- Sin City (2005)
- Sin City: A Dame to Kill For (2014)
- Skippy (1931)
- Slumberland (2022)
- The Smurfs (2011)
- The Smurfs 2 (2013)
- Snake Eyes (2021)
- Son of the Mask (2005)
- Sonic the Hedgehog (2020)
- Sonic the Hedgehog 2 (2022)
- Sonic the Hedgehog 3 (2024)
- Space Battleship Yamato (2010)
- Space Jam (1996)
- Space Jam: A New Legacy (2021)
- Sparks (2013)
- Spawn (1997)
- Speed Racer (2008)
- Spider-Man (1977)
- Spider-Man (1978)
- Spider-Man (2002)
- Spider-Man 2 (2004)
- Spider-Man 3 (2007)
- Spider-Man: Homecoming (2017)
- Spider-Man: Far From Home (2019)
- Spider-Man: No Way Home (2021)
- Spider-Man: Brand New Day (2026)
- The Spirit (2008)
- SpongeBob SquarePants film series
- Steel (1997)
- Stuart Little (1999)
- Stuart Little 2 (2002)
- The Swan Princess film series
- Snow White (2025)
- Snowpiercer (2014)
- The Suicide Squad (2021)
- Suicide Squad (2016)
- Superman (1948)
- Superman (1978)
- Superman (1980)
- Superman II (1980)
- Superman III (1983)
- Superman IV: The Quest for Peace (1987)
- Superman Returns (2006)
- Superman and the Mole Men (1951)
- Superman (2025)
- Supergirl (1984)
- Swamp Thing (1982)

== T ==
- Teenage Mutant Ninja Turtles (1990)
- Teenage Mutant Ninja Turtles II: The Secret of the Ooze (1991)
- Teenage Mutant Ninja Turtles III (1993)
- Teenage Mutant Ninja Turtles (2014)
- Teenage Mutant Ninja Turtles: Out of the Shadows (2016)
- Thor (2011)
- Thor: The Dark World (2013)
- Thor: Ragnarok (2017)
- Thor: Love and Thunder (2022)
- Thunderbolts* (2025)
- Timecop (1994)
- Timecop 2: The Berlin Decision (2003)
- Tintin and the Golden Fleece (1961)
- Tintin and the Blue Oranges (1964)
- Tom and Jerry (2021)
- Transformers film series
- The Trial of the Incredible Hulk (1989)

== U ==
- Underdog (2007)

== V ==
- V for Vendetta (2005)
- Valerian and the City of a Thousand Planets (2017)
- Venom (2018)
- Venom: Let There Be Carnage (2021)
- Venom: The Last Dance (2024)
- Vicky the Viking (2009)
- Vicky and the Treasure of the Gods (2011)

== W ==
- Watchmen (2009)
- We Are the Best! (2013)
- Werewolf by Night (2022)
- Werner film series (1990-2011)
- Whiteout (2009)
- Winnie-the-Pooh: Blood and Honey (2023)
- Winnie-the-Pooh: Blood and Honey 2 (2024)
- Winnie-the-Pooh: Blood and Honey 3 – The Lost Years (2027)
- The Wolverine (2013)
- Wonder Woman (1974)
- Wonder Woman (2017)
- Wonder Woman 1984 (2020)
- Woody Woodpecker (2017)
- Woody Woodpecker Goes to Camp (2024)

== X ==
- X-Men film series

== Y ==
- Yatterman (2009)
- Yogi Bear (2010)
- Yo-Kai Watch: Soratobu Kujira to Double no Sekai no Daiboken da Nyan! (2016)
- Yor, the Hunter from the Future (1983)
- Your Lie in April (2016)
