= 35-sai no Koukousei =

- Also known as: No Dropping Out: Back to School at 35
- Genre: School Life, Slice of life, Drama
- Starring: Ryoko Yonekura; Junpei Mizobata; Tetsuya Watari
- Narrated by: Rikiya Koyama
- Ending theme: "Flower Song" by EXILE
- Composer: Masaru Yokoyama
- Country of origin: Japan
- Original language: Japanese
- No. of series: 1
- No. of episodes: 11

Production
- Production location: Tokyo, Japan
- Running time: Saturday at 21:00-21:54 (JST)

Original release
- Network: NTV
- Release: 13 April – 22 June 2013

35-sai no Koukousei (35歳の高校生, lit. "35-year-old High School Student", English title: "No Dropping Out - Back to School at 35 -") is a 2013 NTV Japanese television drama, starring Ryoko Yonekura and Junpei Mizobata. It aired from 13 April 2013 to 22 June 2013 with a total of 11 episodes.

== Synopsis ==
The drama centers around how a 35 year old changes the school and influences her classmates’ lives while dealing with the dark reality of today’s high schools, including bullying and skipping school.

== Plot ==
During the new semester in April, a woman suddenly appeared at Kunikida High. She was to be a new student in a class for 3rd year high school students. The other students in the class wondered who she truly was, and what her true intention for going back to school at 35 years old was. She did what ordinary high school students were expected to do, i.e. wearing school uniform and doing homework. However, she was clearly different. She went to school in an expensive car. During break time, she smoked with a teacher. After school, she drank beer. No one knows what she was up to, but they know, she was able to change people. She questioned the system and fought to change it. She tried to solve the problems faced by high school students, for example, bullying. She helped her classmates and befriended them, whilst trying to survive high school and put her tragic past behind her. Nevertheless, there is no secret that can be kept forever, and eventually the truth had to be let out... even if that meant having to confront her past.

== Cast ==
=== Main cast ===
- Ryoko Yonekura as Ayako Baba
  - Mayu Matsuoka as young Ayako
- Junpei Mizobata as Junichi Koizumi

=== Faculty Members ===
- Tetsuya Watari as Yukinobu Asada
- Nana Katase as Akiri Nagamine
- Takeshi Masu as Makio Ninagawa
- Toshihide Tonesaku as Takashi Saruwatari
- Hiroki Aiba as Ryuichiro Kitajima
- Yohei Kumabe as Wataru Iseya
- Sho Ikushima as Koichi Higuchi
- Megumi Yokoyama as Yuki Mayuzumi
- Takaaki Enoki as Yoshio Noda

=== Class 3-A ===
- Taiko Katono as Ryota Otake
- Shiori Kitayama as Yuna Izumi
- Fujiko Kojima as Moe Kokubun
- Yua Shinkawa as Mitsuki Kudo
- Masaki Suda as Masamitsu Tsuchiya
- Mahiro Takasugi as Ren Higashi
- Yukito Nishii as Teppei Saegusa
- Shuhei Nomura as Osamu Yukawa
- Alice Hirose as Rina Hasegawa
- Reiko Fujiwara as Mai Yuki
- Elina Mizuno as Ai Yamashita
- Karen Miyazaki as Rikako Hatori
- Aoi Morikawa as Hitomi Eto
- Kento Yamazaki as Ryo Akutsu
- Masami Imai as Rin Sato
- Haruna Onishi as Momoko Ueda
- Takumi Sato as Yuta Shimizu
- Tomoya Shiba as Hitoshi Okura
- Yoshiro Dojun as Tetsuya Jinbo
- Kazuya Nakajima as Shinichi Kashiwagi
- Tatsuya Nakayama as Yuji Matsumoto
- Sumire Fujishiro as Keiko Hirakawa
- Koki Horikoshi as Goki Murata
- Daiki Mihara as Yosuke Shinohara
- Izumi Yabe as Yui Matsushita
- Mari Yamachi as Sayuri Tachibana

=== Guest cast ===
- Marika Tanaka (episode 1)
- Hajime Yamazaki as Rina Hasegawa’s father (episode 1)
- Yorie Yamashita as Rina Hasegawa’s mother (episode 1)
- Kentaro Shimazu as a high school teacher (episode 1)
- Junichi Kikawa as a news reporter (episode 1)
- Marie Ueda as a news reporter (episode 1)
- Takashi Ukaji as Ai Yamashita's father (episode 2)
- Hajime Okayama as a police Officer (episode 2)
- Keiko Shinohe as the woman Ai tries to steal from (episode 2)
- Hisako Matsuyama as a parent (episode 2)
- Masaya Seto as a parent (episode 2)
- Yoshiko Minami as a parent (episode 2)
- Takaya Sakoda (episode 2)
- Shoji Kamata (episode 2)

== Production credits ==
- Screenwriters: Yamaura Masahiro, Takahashi Yuya
- Chief Producer: Ohira Futoshi
- Producers: Ikeda Kenji, Akimoto Takayuki, Taka Aki
- Directors:Sakuma Noriyoshi, Nagumo Seiichi, Nishino Maki
- Music: Yokoyama Masaru

== Episode Ratings ==
Episode	Broadcast Date	Ratings (Kanto Region)
01	13 April 2013	14.7%
02	20 April 2013	12.9%
03	27 April 2013	15.1%
04	4 May 2013	14.7%
05	11 May 2013	12.9%
06	18 May 2013	12.1%
07	25 May 2013	11.3%
08	1 June 2013	12.7%
09	8 June 2013	9.9%
10	15 June 2013	13.1%
11	22 June 2013	14.7%
Average		13.3%
