= Suzu Hirose =

Japanese actress and model (born 1998)

- 広瀬 すず
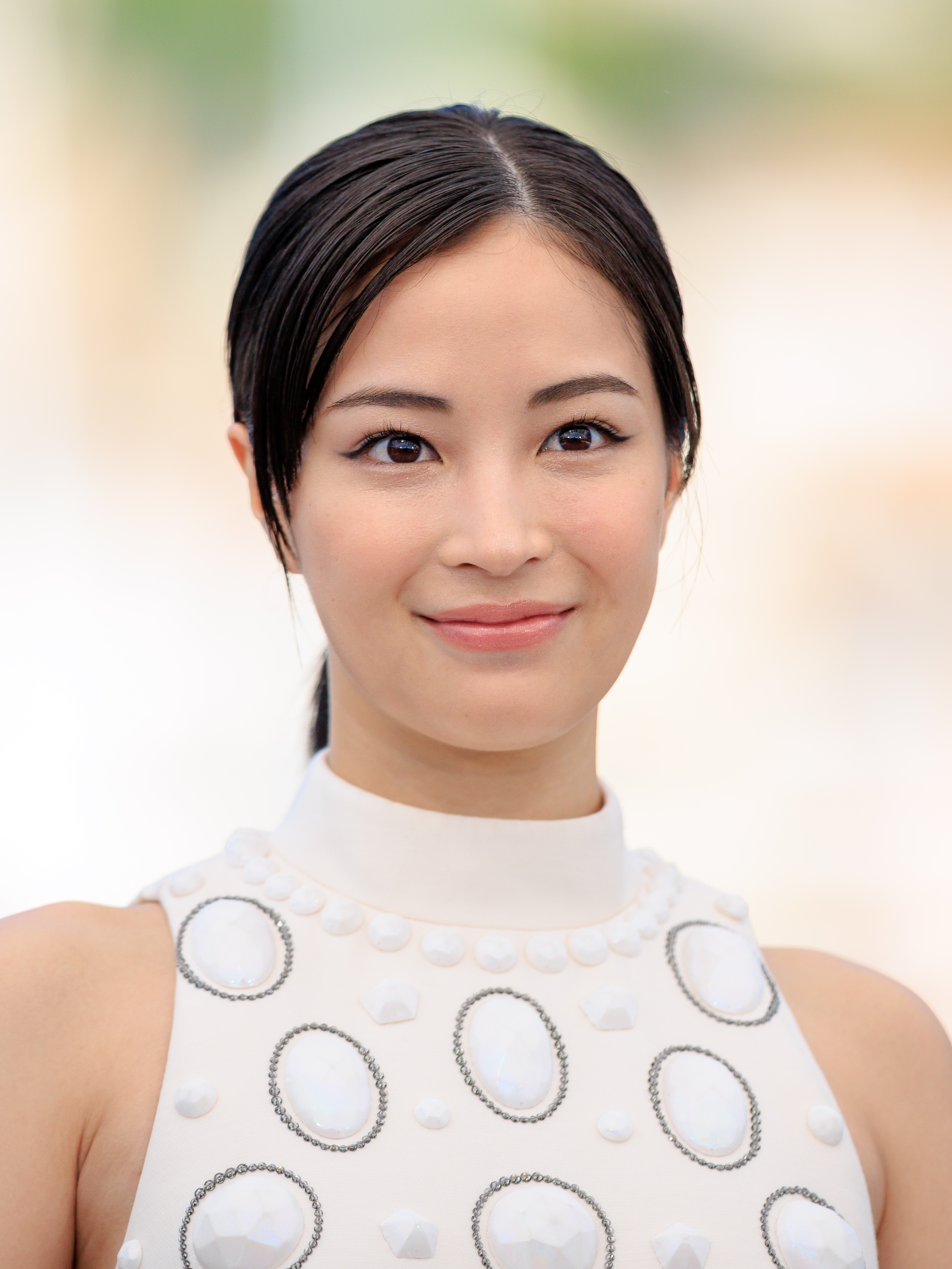
- Hirose at the 2025 Cannes Film Festival
- Born: 19 June 1998 (age 28); Shimizu-ku, Shizuoka, Japan
- Occupations: Actress; model
- Years active: 2012–present
- Agent: Foster
- Known for: Our Little Sister; Chihayafuru; The Third Murder
- Relatives: Alice Hirose (older sister)

Suzu Hirose (広瀬 すず, Hirose Suzu; born June 19, 1998) is a Japanese actress and model.

== Biography ==
Hirose was born in the city of Shimizu (now part of Shizuoka City), Shizuoka Prefecture on June 19, 1998. She is the youngest of three siblings, with an older brother and an older sister, actress Alice Hirose.

== Career ==
Hirose debuted as a model for Japanese fashion magazine Seventeen, alongside her sister Alice. She gained fame when she starred with a group of actresses as the eponymous sister in the award-winning film Our Little Sister. The film won the Picture of the Year award at the 39th Japan Academy Film Prize. Her role for the film garnered her the Newcomer of the Year award in the same ceremony. The film was also selected to compete for the Palme d'Or at the 2015 Cannes Film Festival.

In 2017, Hirose appeared in the film The Third Murder which was a massive success. She won the Best Supporting Actress award in the 41st Japan Academy Film Prize for her role and the film was also awarded the Picture of the Year award in the same ceremony. The film was also screened in the main competition section of the 74th Venice International Film Festival.

She was selected to play the main lead in the live-action trilogy films Chihayafuru, which received box-office successes. She was nominated twice for the Outstanding Performance By An Actress in a Leading Role awards in the Japan Academy Film Prize for her roles in Chihayafuru Part 1 in the 40th Japan Academy Film Prize and Not Quite Dead Yet in the 44th Japan Academy Film Prize.

Hirose played the heroine for the NHK's 100th Asadora, Natsuzora: Natsu's Sky. She has appeared in multiple commercials since 2013 and regularly tops various polls for celebrities with the most endorsements. Hirose appeared in a number of television dramas such as Kaitō Yamaneko (2016) and Nemesis (2021).

She was nominated for the Best Supporting Actress award in the 45th Japan Academy Film Prize for her role in the film A Morning of Farewell.

== Filmography ==
=== Film ===
Year	Title	Role	Notes	Ref.
2013	The Apology King	Tsugumi		
2014	Hōkago Tachi: Lolita Nante	Rinko		
2014	Crows Explode	Mie Uchida		
2015	Our Little Sister	Suzu Asano	Lead role	
2015	The Boy and the Beast	Kaede (voice)		
2016	Chihayafuru Part 1	Chihaya Ayase	Lead role	
2016	Chihayafuru Part 2	Chihaya Ayase	Lead role	
2016	Rage	Izumi Komiyama		
2016	Your Lie in April	Kaori Miyazono	Lead role	
2017	Let's Go, Jets!	Hikari Tomonaga	Lead role	
2017	My Teacher	Hibiki Shimada	Lead role	
2017	Fireworks	Nazuna Oikawa (voice)	Lead role	
2017	The Third Murder	Sakie Yamanaka		
2018	Laplace's Witch	Madoka Uhara		
2018	Chihayafuru Part 3	Chihaya Ayase	Lead role	
2018	Sunny: Our Hearts Beat Together	Nami Abe (young)	Lead role	
2019	Lupin III: The First	Laetitia (voice)		
2020	Last Letter	Misaki Tōno / Ayumi Tōno		
2020	Not Quite Dead Yet	Nanase	Lead role	
2020	The Untold Tale of the Three Kingdoms	transformed Diaochan	Cameo	
2021	A Morning of Farewell	Mayo Hoshino		
2022	Wandering	Sarasa Kanai	Lead role	
2023	Nemesis: The Mystery of the Golden Spiral	Anna Mikami	Lead role	
2023	The Water Flows to the Sea	Chisa Sakaki	Lead role	
2023	Kyrie	Itsuko "Ikko" Ichijō		
2024	At the Bench		Lead role; anthology film	
2025	Unreachable	Misaki	Lead role	
2025	Hero's Island	Yamako		
2025	Yasuko, Songs of Days Past	Yasuko Hasegawa	Lead role	
2025	A Pale View of Hills	Etsuko	Lead role; British-Japanese film	
2026	You, Like a Star	Akimi Inoue	Lead role	
2027	All That Exists	Riho Tsuchiya		

=== Television series ===
Year	Title	Role	Notes	Ref.
2013	Ghostly Girl	Asuka Yuzuki		
2013	Take Five	Rui Sasahara (Girlhood)		
2013	Gekiryū: Watashi o Oboete Imasuka?	Takako Midōhara (Junior High School)		
2014	Bitter Blood	Shinobu Sahara		
2014	Fathers	Shinobu Koizumi	Episode 3	
2014	The Man of the Tokyo Olympics	Wada Mary Mariko	Television film	
2015	The Girl's Speech	Tsubame Haruna	Lead role	
2016	The Mysterious Thief Yamaneko	Mao Takasugi		
2018	Anone	Harika Tsujisawa	Lead role	
2018	We Are Rockets!	Hikari Tomonaga	Special appearance	
2019	Natsuzora: Natsu's Sky	Natsu Okuhara	Lead role; Asadora	
2021	Air Girl	Komari Sano	Lead role; television film	
2021	Ann's Lyrics: Ann Sakuragi's Haiku Lessons	Ann Sakuragi	Lead role; miniseries	
2021	Okehazama	Nōhime	Television film	
2021	Nemesis	Anna Mikami	Lead role	
2022	Umeko: The Face of Female Education	Tsuda Umeko	Lead role; television film	
2023	Hold My Hand at Twilight	Soramame Asagi	Lead role	
2025	Who Saw the Peacock Dance in the Jungle?	Komugi Yamashita	Lead role	
2025	Asura	Sakiko	Lead role	
2025	Chihayafuru: Full Circle	Chihaya Ayase		
2026	Human Vapor	Kaho Fujikawa		
2027	Fujiyama Boy	Mami Hamamiya		

=== Television shows ===
Year	Title	Role	Notes	Ref.
2013	Mohaya Kami Dane		17 April–18 September	
2018	69th NHK Kōhaku Uta Gassen	Red team host		
2019	70th NHK Kōhaku Uta Gassen	Judge		

=== Web drama ===
- Aoharu Online Beta (Shueisha)
  - "Aoharu Jikan Natsu" (July 5, 2013 – August 8, 2013)
  - "Suzu to no Aoi Haru" (September 6, 2013 – October 25, 2013)
- Kataomoi vol.12 (October 28, 2013)
- Jadict "Lovely Hickey #14" (November 4, 2013)
- Ghost Band (December 10, 2013, Nestle Theater on YouTube)

=== Radio drama ===
- Very Merry Christmas (Tokyo FM, December 15, 2013), Kairi

=== Radio show ===
- School of Lock! - Girls Locks! (Tokyo FM, October 14, 2013 – March 16, 2017)
- Ghana presents - Hirose Suzu no Carnation Letter (Tokyo FM, May 6, 2014)
- Hirose Suzu no All Night Nippon Gold (Nippon Broadcasting System, March 20, 2015)
- Hirose Suzu no Yohaku Jikan (Tokyo FM, October 7, 2023 –)

=== Music video appearances ===
Year	Title	Artist	Ref.
2013	"Christmas Eve (30th Anniversary Edition)"	Tatsuro Yamashita	
2014	"Precious Love"	Atsushi	
2015	"Itsuka Kitto"	Naoto Inti Raymi	
2015	"Hana"	Kobukuro	
2017	"Tetote"	Whiteeeen feat. GReeeeN	
2017	"Uta Usagi"	Spitz	
2025	"Hitsu Zetsu"	Radwimps	

== Stage ==
=== Theatre ===
Year	Title		Role	Venue	Date	Ref.
Year	English	Japanese	Role	Venue	Date	Ref.
2019	A Night at the Kabuki	Q: A Night at the Kabuki	Juliet of Minamoto	Tokyo Metropolitan Theatre	October 8–15 November 9–December 11	
2022	A Night at the Kabuki	Q: A Night at the Kabuki	Juliet of Minamoto	Tokyo Metropolitan Theatre	July 29–September 11	
2022	A Night at the Kabuki	Q: A Night at the Kabuki	Juliet of Minamoto	Sadler’s Wells Theatre	22–24 September	
2022	A Night at the Kabuki	Q: A Night at the Kabuki	Juliet of Minamoto	Shin Kabuki-za Theatre, Osaka	7–16 October	
2022	A Night at the Kabuki	Q: A Night at the Kabuki	Juliet of Minamoto	National Theater, Taipei	25–30 October	

== Bibliography ==
=== Magazine ===
- Seventeen, Shueisha 1967-, as an exclusive model (October 2012 – November 2018)
- B.L.T., Tokyo News Service 1997-, "Zenzen, Hajimetedesu" (June 2014 – May 2016)
- CM Now, Genkosha 1931-, "Arisuzu" (July/August 2014 – July/August 2017)
- Grand Jump, Shueisha 1967-, "1 piece" (January 21, 2015 – April 1, 2015)
- Nikkei Entertainment!, Nikkei BP 1997-, "Makezugirai" (April 2017 – July 2018)

=== Photobook ===
- Hirose Suzu 1st Photobook "Suzu" (March 31, 2014), Tokyo News Service, ISBN 978-4863363915
- 17-sai no Suzubon (March 19, 2016), Shueisha, ISBN 978-4087807776
- Suzu Hirose in Natsuzora Photobook (April 1, 2019), Tokyo News Service, ISBN 978-4863369184
- Leisure Treasure (February 19, 2022), Kodansha, ISBN 978-4065194003

=== Book cover ===
- Suitei Osananajimi Part 1 (May 24, 2013)
- Suitei Osananajimi Part 2 (June 25, 2013)

== Discography ==
=== Audio ===
- Hatsukoi / Kazemachi de Aimasho (June 24, 2015)
- Rōei Ogura Hyakunin Isshu (April 6, 2016)
- Ruriiro no Chikyuu / Fireworks OST (August 9, 2017)

=== Record jacket ===
- Ai no Uta Bitter Sweet Tracks 2 → mixed by Q;indivi+ / Ai no Uta J-Pop Non Stop Mox 2 → mixed by DJ Fumi★Yeah! (December 24, 2014)
- back number - "Heroine" (January 21, 2015)
- Naoto Inti Raymi - Itsuka Kitto (April 8, 2015)

== Advertisements ==
=== TV commercial ===
- Benesse Corporation - Shinken Seminar Kōkō Kōza (2012 - 2013)
- Nippon Telegraph and Telephone East Corporation - FLET'S Hikari Ninen Wari (2013)
- Otsuka Foods - Match/Match Pink (2014)
- Lotte
  - Ghana (2014 - 2015)
  - Koume (2014)
  - Fit's (2015 - 2016)
  - Sō (2017 - 2021)
- Recruit Marketing Partners
  - Zexy (2014 - 2015) - 7th Commercial Girl
  - Rikunabi Next (2021)
- SoftBank
  - SoftBank Mobile - Shirato Family (2014 - 2021)
  - SoftBank Robotics - Whiz (2020)
  - Softbank 5G (2021)
- Line Corporation - Line Play (2014)
- Shizuoka Ichigo Kyōgikai - Shizuoka Strawberry "Benihoppe" (2014)
- JR East - JR SkiSki (2014 - 2015)
- Myojo Foods
  - Ippeichan Yomise no Yakisoba (2015 - 2016)
  - Charumera (2017)
- Tokyo Gas
  - Ene Farm (2015)
  - Anata to Zutto Kyo yori Motto (2015)
  - Barber Suga (2016)
- Shiseido
  - Sea Breeze (2015)
  - D Program (2020)
  - 150th Anniversary Commercial (2022)
- Katakura Industries - Cocoon City (2015)
- Fujifilm
  - Shaprise Shiyou (2015)
  - Fuji Color
  - Oshogatsu wo Utsuso (2015 - 2021)
  - Mashikaku Print (2017)
  - Instax mini (2018)
  - Instax mini Evo (2021)
- Senju Pharmaceutical - Mytear CL (2015 - 2020)
- Nippon Professional Baseball Organization (2015)
- Universal Studios Japan
  - Universal Surprise Halloween (2015)
  - The Wizarding World of Harry Potter (2016)
- Leopalace21 (2015 - 2016)
- Mitsubishi UFJ NICOS - DC Card (2016 - 2018)
- GlaxoSmithKline Consumer Healthcare Japan - Contac (2016 - 2020)
- Square Enix - Final Fantasy Brave Exvius (2016 - 2017)
- Suzuki - Suzuki Wagon R (2017 - 2019)
- Stripe International - Earth Music&Ecology (2017 - 2020)
- Otsuka Pharmaceutical - Five Mini (2017)
- Tokyo Organising Committee of the Olympic and Paralympic Games - Recruit Volunteers (2018)
- Japanese Red Cross Society - Blood Donation at Twenty (2018)
- The Pokémon Company - Pokémon Trading Card Game (2018)
- Toshiba Lifestyle (2018 - 2019)
- Asahi Soft Drinks
  - Mitsuya Cider (2019)
  - Mitsuya Lemonade (2019)
  - Plant Time Soy Milk Tea (2020)
- Ministry of Agriculture, Forestry and Fisheries - #Genkini Itadakimasu Project (2020)
- AGC (2021)
- Ajinomoto Frozen Food - Gyoza★ (2021)
- Mitsui Fudosan - Be The Change (2021)
- Air Jordan (Japan) Tokyo Fearless Ones (2021)
- Weathernews app (2023)

=== Ambassador ===
- Haruta Inc. - Haruta Image Girl (2013)
- Japan Fire and Crisis Management Association - Zenkoku Kasai Yobō Undō (2014-2015)
- 93rd All Japan High School Soccer Tournament - 10th Cheergirl (2014)
- Cocoon City - First Image Character (2015 - 2016)
- Japan Industrial Safety & Health Association - National Safety Week, Heat Stroke Prevention (2015)
- Japan International Cooperation Agency - Nantokashinakya! Project (2015)
- Ministry of Internal Affairs and Communications - Voting at 18 Years Old Image Character (2015)
- Kimono Yamato - Image Character (2015)
- B.League - Special Booster (2016)
- Crocs Japan - Global Ambassador (2019)
- Louis Vuitton - Ambassador (2020)
- Air Jordan (Japan) - Face of the Brand (2021)

== Exhibitions ==
- Pure Actress - photo exhibition of 50 Japanese actresses
  - Hong Kong (2016)
  - Shanghai (2017)
  - Macau - Art Macau 2019 (10 - August 29, 2019)
  - Tokyo Omotesandō (14 July - August 8, 2021)
- Oh My Sister! - photo exhibition of Hirose sisters
  - Tokyo Ginza (1 - March 10, 2019)
  - Osaka Umeda (December 28, 2019 - January 26, 2020)

== Awards and nominations ==
Year	Award	Category	Work(s)	Result	Ref.
2015	The 7th Tama Cinema Forum	Best Rising Actress	Our Little Sister and The Boy and the Beast	Won	
2015	The 28th Tokyo International Film Festival	Arigato Award	Herself	Won	
2015	The 40th Hochi Film Awards	Best New Artist	Our Little Sister	Won	
2015	The 28th Nikkan Sports Film Awards	Best Newcomer	Our Little Sister	Won	
2016	The 37th Yokohama Film Festival	Best Newcomer	Our Little Sister	Won	
2016	The 89th Kinema Junpo Awards	Best New Actress	Our Little Sister	Won	
2016	The 39th Japan Academy Film Prize	Newcomer of the Year	Our Little Sister	Won	
2016	The 25th Tokyo Sports Film Awards	Newcomer of the Year	Our Little Sister	Won	
2016	The 29th Nikkan Sports Film Awards	Best Supporting Actress	Rage	Nominated	
2017	The 59th Blue Ribbon Awards	Best Actress	Rage	Nominated	
2017	The 40th Japan Academy Film Prize	Best Actress	Chihayafuru	Nominated	
2017	The 40th Japan Academy Film Prize	Best Supporting Actress	Rage	Nominated	
2017	The 26th Tokyo Sports Film Awards	Best Supporting Actress	Rage	Won	
2017	The 41st Elan d'or Awards	Newcomer of the Year	Herself	Won	
2017	The 30th Nikkan Sports Film Awards	Best Actress	Let's Go, Jets!	Nominated	
2017	The 30th Nikkan Sports Film Awards	Best Supporting Actress	The Third Murder	Nominated	
2018	The 72nd Mainichi Film Awards	Best Supporting Actress	The Third Murder	Nominated	
2018	The 12th Asian Film Awards	Best Supporting Actress	The Third Murder	Nominated	
2018	The 41st Japan Academy Film Prize	Best Supporting Actress	The Third Murder	Won	
2018	The 27th Tokyo Sports Film Awards	Best Supporting Actress	The Third Murder	Won	
2018	The 27th Tokyo Sports Film Awards	Best Actress	Let's Go, Jets!	Nominated	
2018	The 60th Blue Ribbon Awards	Best Actress	Let's Go, Jets!	Nominated	
2018	The 60th Blue Ribbon Awards	Best Supporting Actress	The Third Murder, My Teacher	Nominated	
2019	VoCE Best Cosmetics Awards 2019	Most Beautiful Face	Herself	Won	
2020	The 54th Kinokuniya Theater Awards	Individual Award	Q: A Night at the Kabuki	Won	
2020	Wowow Theatrical Awards 2019	Rookie of the Year	Q: A Night at the Kabuki	Won	
2020	The 28th Hashida Awards	Rookie Award	Natsuzora: Natsu's Sky	Won	
2021	The 44th Japan Academy Film Prize	Best Actress	Not Quite Dead Yet	Nominated	
2022	The 45th Japan Academy Film Prize	Best Supporting Actress	A Morning of Farewell	Nominated	
2022	The 35th Nikkan Sports Film Awards	Best Actress	Wandering	Nominated	
2022	The 14th Tama Film Awards	Best Actress	Wandering	Won	
2022	Elle Cinema Awards 2022	Best Actress	Wandering	Won	
2023	The 65th Blue Ribbon Awards	Best Actress	Wandering	Nominated	
2023	The 46th Japan Academy Film Prize	Best Actress	Wandering	Nominated	
2024	The 78th Mainichi Film Awards	Best Supporting Actress	Kyrie	Won	
2024	The 66th Blue Ribbon Awards	Best Supporting Actress	Kyrie	Nominated	
2025	2025 International Streaming Festival - Global OTT Awards	Best Lead Actor (Female)	Who Saw the Peacock Dance in the Jungle?	Nominated	
2025	The 17th Tama Film Awards	Best Actress	A Pale View of Hills	Won	
2025	The 38th Nikkan Sports Film Awards	Best Actress	A Pale View of Hills, Yasuko, Songs of Days Past and Unreachable	Won	
2026	The 68th Blue Ribbon Awards	Best Actress	A Pale View of Hills, Yasuko, Songs of Days Past and Unreachable	Won	
2026	The 68th Blue Ribbon Awards	Best Supporting Actress	Hero's Island	Nominated	
2026	The 47th Yokohama Film Festival	Best Actress	A Pale View of Hills and Yasuko, Songs of Days Past	Won	
2026	The 49th Japan Academy Film Prize	Best Actress	A Pale View of Hills	Nominated	
2026	The 39th Nikkan Sports Film Awards	Best Actress	You, Like a Star	Pending	
