= Shūhei Nomura =

Japanese actor (born 1993)

- 野村 周平
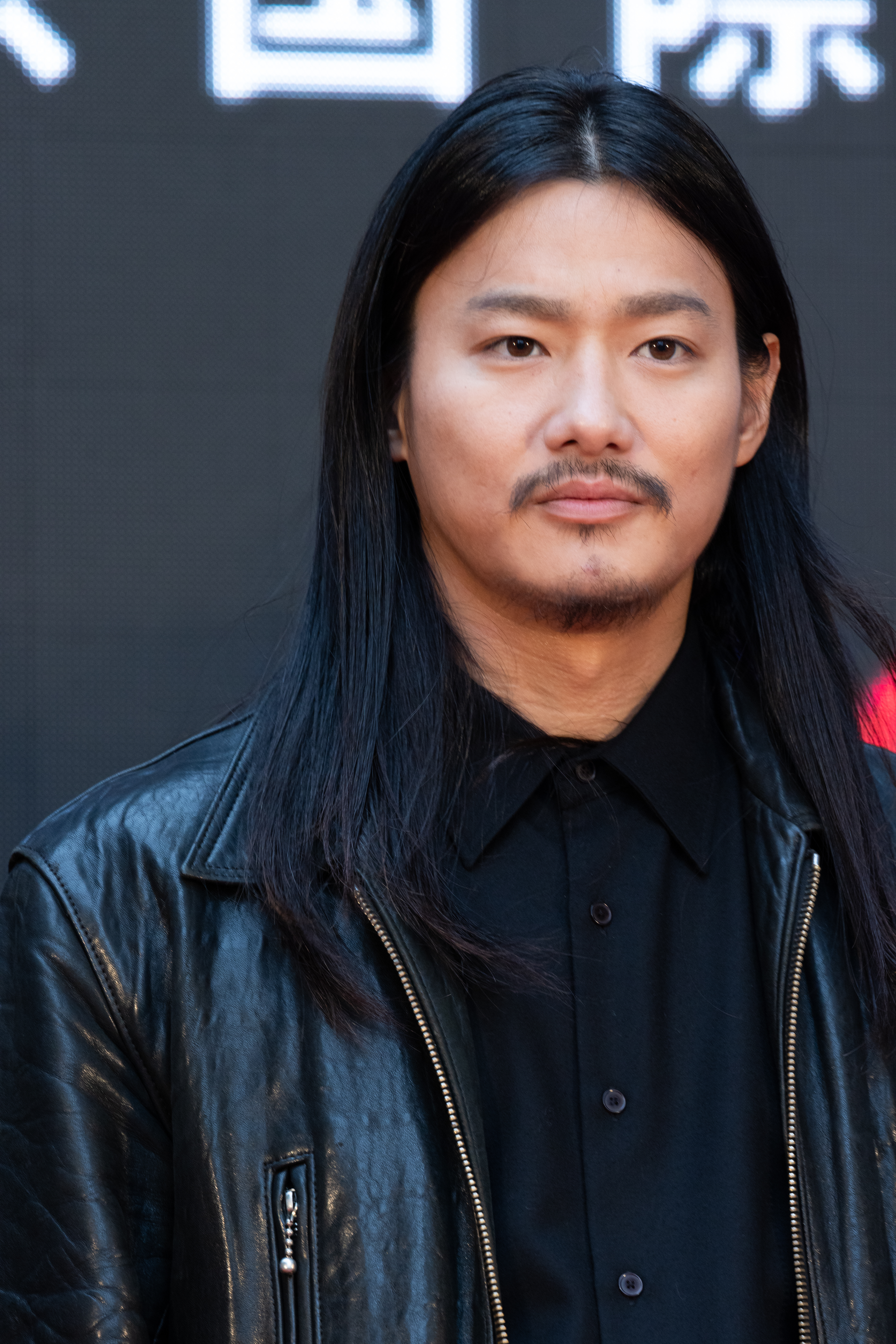
- Nomura at the Tokyo International Film Festival in 2024
- Born: 14 November 1993 (age 32); Kobe, Japan
- Occupation: Actor
- Years active: 2009–present
- Agent: Amuse Inc.
- Website: amuse.co.jp

Shūhei Nomura (野村 周平, Nomura Shūhei; born November 14, 1993) is a Japanese actor. He was born in Kobe, Hyogo Prefecture, and is of one-quarter Chinese descent and speaks fluent Chinese. In 2009, he was selected from about 30,000 applicants as the winner of the Nationwide Amuse Audition.

== Filmography ==
=== Films ===
- Drucker in the Dug-Out (2011), Harumichi Tamura
- The Detective Is in the Bar (2011)
- Tengoku Kara no Yell (2011), Kiyoshi Nakamura
- Soup: Umarekawari no Monogatari (2012), Naoyuki Mikami
- Enoshima Prism (2013), Saku Kijima
- Daily Lives of High School Boys (2013), Yoshitake
- Puzzle (2014), Shigeo Yuasa
- Kujira no Ita Natsu (2014), Chūya
- Hibi Rock (2014), Takurō Hibinuma
- Flying Colors (2015), Reiji Mori
- The Pearls of the Stone Man (2015)
- Lychee Light Club (2015)
- Chihayafuru Part 1 (2016), Taichi Mashima
- Chihayafuru Part 2 (2016), Taichi Mashima
- Moriyamachu Driving School (2016), Kiyotaka Satō
- Museum (2016), Junichi Nishino
- Sagrada Reset: Part 1 (2017), Kei Asai
- Sagrada Reset: Part 2 (2017), Kei Asai
- Teiichi: Battle of Supreme High (2017), Kikuma Tōgō
- Chigasaki Monogatari: My Little Hometown (2017), Keisuke Kuwata
- Love × Doc (2018), Seiya Hanada
- Chihayafuru Part 3 (2018), Taichi Mashima
- The Antique (2018), Daisuke Goura
- Junpei, Think Again (2018), Junpei Sakamoto
- Walking Man (2019), Atom Samaki
- Alivehoon (2022), Kōichi Ōba
- And So I'm at a Loss (2023), Katō
- Refugee X (2023), Takuma Nimura
- Oi Handsome!! (2024), Isao
- Silent Love (2024), Yūma Kitamura
- 11 Rebels (2024), Irie Kazuma
- Samurai Vengeance (2026), Lord Toyama
- Bad Lieutenant: Tokyo (2026)
- Missed You, Left You, Lost You, Miss You (2026), Ko Kawakubo

=== Television ===
- Peacemaker Kurogane (2010), Rei kitamura
- Pro Golfer Hana (2010), Riku Nomiya
- Tenshi no Wakemae (2010), Kōta Kitamura
- Hammer Session! (2010), Ken Ebihara
- Tōi Hi no Yukue (2011), Takashi Kanda
- High School Restaurant (2011), Kōichi Nakamura
- Taira no Kiyomori Episode 6 (Taiga drama, 2012), Shunya
- Blackboard: Jidai to Tatakatta Kyōshitachi (2012), Hiromasa Isobe
- Umechan Sensei (2012), Mitsuo Satō
- Umechan Sensei: Kekkon Dekinai Otoko to Onna Special (2012)
- Miss Double Faced Teacher Episode 7 (2012), Naoki Īzuka
- GTO Episode 10-11 (2012), Shō Shibutani
- Perfect Blue Episode 9-11 (2012), Katsuhiko Morooka
- Sodom no Ringo: Lot o Koroshita Musumetachi (2013), Toshiya Shimomura(Childhood)
- 35-sai no Koukousei (2013), Osamu Yukawa
- The Detective's Gaze Episode 1 (2013), Yūma Maeda
- The Hours of My Life (2014), Rikuto Sawada
- All About My Siblings (2014)
- Koinaka (2015), Shōta Aoi
- Fragile (2016), Hisashi Morii
- A Girl & Three Sweethearts (2016), Toma Shibasaki
- Rappers of Saitama Drama Episode 5–8 (2017)
- The Supporting Actors (2017), Himself
- Teiichi's Country - Cafe at Student Street (2017), Kikuma Togo
- Doctor-X (S5) Episode 1–2 (2017), Ryoji Ito
- Denei Shojo: Video Girl Ai 2018 (2018), Sho Moteuchi
- Choosing Spouse By Lottery (2018), Tatsuhiko Miyasaka
- Endo Kenichi to Kudo Kankuro no Benkyo Sasete Itadakimasu Episode 4 (2018)
- Secret Unrequited Love (2019), Takuma Kakinouchi
- MAGI Tensho Keno Shonen Shisetsu (2019), Itō Mancio
- Diver: Special Investigation Unit (2020), Syo Sanemura
- Don't Cry Doctor-In-Training (2021), So Kawamura
- Chihayafuru: Full Circle (2025), Taichi Mashima
- Human Vapor (2026), Yasutoshi Mori (young)

=== Dubbing ===
- Typhoon Noruda (2015), Shūichi Azuma

== Bibliography ==
=== Photobooks ===
- Nomura Shuhei in Kinema (Amuse Inc., June 2015) ISBN 3566140457

== Awards ==
- The 10th Ōsaka Cinema Festival (2015): Best Newcomer for Kujira no Ita Natsu and Hibi Rock
- The 7th Tama Cinema Forum: Best Rising Actor for Ai o Tsumu Hito, Hibi Rock, Flying Colors and Typhoon Noruda
