= 45th Japan Academy Film Prize =

Japanese film awards in 2022

- Date: March 11, 2022
- Site: Grand Prince Hotel New Takanawa, Tokyo, Japan
- Hosted by: Shinichi Hatori; Masami Nagasawa

Highlights
- Most awards: Drive My Car (8)
- Most nominations: Last of the Wolves (13)

The 45th Japan Academy Film Prize (第45回日本アカデミー賞) is the 45th edition of the Japan Academy Film Prize, an award presented by the Nippon Academy-Sho Association to award excellence in filmmaking.

== Winners and nominees ==
=== Awards ===
Picture of the Year	Animation of the Year
Drive My Car; It's a Flickering Life; Last of the Wolves; Under the Open Sky; In the Wake	Evangelion: 3.0+1.0 Thrice Upon a Time; Sing a Bit of Harmony; Fortune Favors Lady Nikuko; Jujutsu Kaisen 0; Belle
Director of the Year	Screenplay of the Year
Ryusuke Hamaguchi – Drive My Car; Kazuya Shiraishi – Last of the Wolves; Takahisa Zeze – In the Wake; Miwa Nishikawa – Under the Open Sky; Izuru Narushima – A Morning of Farewell	Ryusuke Hamaguchi and Takamasa Ōe – Drive My Car; Jun'ya Ikegami – Last of the Wolves; Miwa Nishikawa – Under the Open Sky; Tamio Hayashi and Takahisa Zeze – In the Wake; Yoji Yamada and Yūzō Asahara – It's a Flickering Life
Best Actor	Best Actress
Hidetoshi Nishijima – Drive My Car; Takeru Satoh – In the Wake; Masaki Suda – We Made a Beautiful Bouquet; Tori Matsuzaka – Last of the Wolves; Kōji Yakusho – Under the Open Sky	Kasumi Arimura – We Made a Beautiful Bouquet; Yūki Amami – What Happened to Our Nest Egg!?; Mei Nagano – And So the Baton Is Passed; Mayu Matsuoka – Kiba: The Fangs of Fiction; Sayuri Yoshinaga – A Morning of Farewell
Best Supporting Actor	Best Supporting Actress
Ryohei Suzuki – Last of the Wolves; Hiroshi Abe – In the Wake; Shinichi Tsutsumi – The Fable: The Killer Who Doesn't Kill; Taiga Nakano – Under the Open Sky; Nijirō Murakami – Last of the Wolves	Kaya Kiyohara – In the Wake; Satomi Ishihara – And So the Baton Is Passed; Mitsuko Kusabue – What Happened to Our Nest Egg!?; Nanase Nishino – Last of the Wolves; Suzu Hirose – A Morning of Farewell
Outstanding Achievement in Music	Outstanding Achievement in Cinematography
Taisei Iwasaki / Ludvig Forssell / Yuta Bandoh – Belle; Taro Iwashiro – It's a Flickering Life; Yoshihide Otomo – We Made a Beautiful Bouquet; Takatsugu Muramatsu – In the Wake; Goro Yasukawa – A Morning of Farewell; Goro Yasukawa – Last of the Wolves	Hidetoshi Shinomiya – Drive My Car; Norimichi Kasamatsu – Under the Open Sky; Kohei Kato – Last of the Wolves; Masashi Chikamori – It's a Flickering Life; Atsuhiro Nabeshima – In the Wake
Outstanding Achievement in Lighting Direction	Outstanding Achievement in Art Direction
Daiki Takai – Drive My Car; Kenjiro So – Under the Open Sky; Minoru Kawai – Last of the Wolves; Masato Tsuchiyama – It's a Flickering Life; Kagetsuyoshi – In the Wake	Tetsuo Harada – Baragaki: Unbroken Samurai; Tsutomu Imamura – Last of the Wolves; Takashi Nishimura – It's a Flickering Life; Katsuhiro Fukuzawa – A Morning of Farewell; Fumiko Matsuo – In the Wake
Outstanding Achievement in Sound Recording	Outstanding Achievement in Film Editing
Kadoaki Izuta, Miki Nomura – Drive My Car; Kazuharu Urata – Last of the Wolves; Shinya Takada – In the Wake; Shota Nagamura – It's a Flickering Life; Kenichi Fujimoto – A Morning of Farewell	Azusa Yamazaki – Drive My Car; Kazuhide Ishijima – It's a Flickering Life; Hideaki Ohata – A Morning of Farewell; Hitomi Kato – Last of the Wolves; Ryo Hayano – In the Wake
Best Foreign Language Film	Newcomer of the Year
No Time to Die; Tailor; Nomadland; Minari; Dune	Mio Imada – Tokyo Revengers; Nanase Nishino – Last of the Wolves; Tōko Miura – Drive My Car; Ai Yoshikawa – Honey Lemon Soda; Hayato Isomura – A Family and What Did You Eat Yesterday?; Onoe Ukon II – Baragaki: Unbroken Samurai; Hio Miyazawa – Kiba: The Fangs of Fiction; Fukase – Character
Special Award from the Association	Award for Distinguished Service from the Chairman
Kyōko Ōbayashi; Toshiyuki Sasatake; Sadao Tsukioka	Mitsuko Kusabue; Natsuko Toda; Teruyo Nogami; Masako Nozawa; Hanae Mori; Tsutomu Yamazaki
Special Award from the Chairman	Shigeru Okada Award
Yasuo Ōtsuka; Masato Hara; Kunie Tanaka; Sonny Chiba; Shinichiro Sawai; Tan Takaiwa; Emi Wada	Kyoto Animation; Toei Animation
