= Typhoon Noruda =

2015 Japanese anime film directed by Yōjirō Arai

- Promotional poster

Japanese name
- Kanji: 台風のノルダ
Transcriptions
- Revised Hepburn: Taifū no Noruda
- Directed by: Yōjirō Arai
- Produced by: Katsuhiro Takei; Noriko Ozaki
- Starring: Shūhei Nomura; Kaya Kiyohara; Daichi Kaneko
- Cinematography: Mitsuhiro Sato
- Edited by: Hiroshi Okuda
- Music by: Masashi Hamauzu
- Production company: Studio Colorido
- Release date: June 5, 2015
- Running time: 27 minutes
- Country: Japan
- Language: Japanese

Typhoon Noruda (Japanese: 台風のノルダ, Hepburn: Taifū no Noruda) is a 2015 Japanese animated youth school fantasy film produced by Studio Colorido and directed by Yōjirō Arai. It was released on June 5, 2015. Sentai Filmworks has licensed the film.

== Plot ==
The film takes place at a school in Japan where a group of students and their teacher have to wait out a storm that is passing by. The protagonist Azuma has been fighting with his best friend Saijo and has a lot on his mind when he encounters a girl (Noruda) with a mysterious necklace. The girl seems to be in trouble and somehow connected to the storm. Azuma is taken over by a strong will to help this enchanting girl. Who is she and why is she in the middle of the storm? Can Azuma be any help to her? Why is his relationship with Saijo in such turmoil? The story combines little everyday problems and joys with an adventure that is out of this world.

== Characters and cast ==
Characters	Japanese	English
Shuichi Azuma (東 シュウイチ, Azuma Shuichi)	Shūhei Nomura	Adam Gibbs
Noruda (ノルダ)	Kaya Kiyohara	Luci Christian
Kenta Saijo (西条 ケンタ, Saijō Kenta)	Daichi Kaneko	Greg Cote
