= Chihayafuru Part 2 =

2016 film directed by Norihiro Koizumi

Chihayafuru: Shimo no Ku
- Poster

Japanese name
- Kanji: ちはやふる 上の句
- Directed by: Norihiro Koizumi
- Screenplay by: Norihiro Koizumi
- Based on: Chihayafuru by Yuki Suetsugu
- Produced by: Naoaki Kitajima
- Starring: Suzu Hirose; Shūhei Nomura; Mackenyu; Mone Kamishiraishi; Yūma Yamoto; Yūki Morinaga; Hiroya Shimizu; Miyuki Matsuda; Jun Kunimura
- Cinematography: Hiro'o Yanagida
- Edited by: Jun'nosuke Hogaki
- Music by: Masaru Yokoyama
- Production companies: Nippon TV; Toho; Kodansha; Robot Communications; Yomiuri Telecasting Corporation; Dentsu; East Japan Marketing & Communications; KDDI Corporation; GyaO; Sapporo Television Broadcasting; Miyagi Television Broadcasting; Shizuoka Daiichi Television; Chūkyō Television Broadcasting; Hiroshima Telecasting; Fukuoka Broadcasting System; Fukui Broadcasting
- Distributed by: Toho
- Release date: April 29, 2016
- Running time: 112 minutes
- Country: Japan
- Language: Japanese
- Box office: ¥1.22 billion

Chihayafuru: Shimo no Ku (Japanese: ちはやふる 下の句; lit. 'Chihayafuru: Lower Phrase') is a 2016 Japanese sports romantic teen drama film written and directed by Norihiro Koizumi and starring Suzu Hirose, Shūhei Nomura, Mackenyu, Mone Kamishiraishi, Yūma Yamoto, Yūki Morinaga, Hiroya Shimizu, Miyuki Matsuda and Jun Kunimura. It is the second of three live action film adaptations of the manga series Chihayafuru, written and illustrated by Yuki Suetsugu, serving as a sequel to Chihayafuru: Kami no Ku. The film was released in Japan by Toho on April 29, 2016. Chihayafuru: Musubi, the third and final film in the series, was released in Japan on March 17, 2018.

== Cast ==
- Suzu Hirose as Chihaya Ayase
- Shūhei Nomura as Taichi Mashima
- Mackenyu as Arata Wataya
- Mone Kamishiraishi as Kanade Ōe
- Yūma Yamoto as Yūsei Nishida
- Yūki Morinaga as Tsutomu Komano
- Hiroya Shimizu as Akihito Sudō
- Mayu Matsuoka as Shinobu Wakamiya
- Miyuki Matsuda as Taeko Miyauchi
- Jun Kunimura as Harada Hideo
- Ryōtarō Sakaguchi as Hiro Kinashi
- Alice Hirose as Chitose Ayase, Chihaya's sister
- Masane Tsukayama as Hajime Wataya
- Riku Hagiwara

== Production ==
The film was shot at the Omi Shrine in Shiga Prefecture. The theme song of the film is "FLASH" (the same theme song as the first film), by the Japanese group Perfume. The original soundtracks are composed by Masaru Yokoyama.

The band club plays Edward Elgar's:"Pomp and Circumstance", op. 39: March No. 1 to wish them luck at 56:40.

== Release ==
The release date of the film was announced in December 2015 for April 29, 2016.

== Sequel ==
A sequel was announced at Chihayafuru: Shimo no Ku's premiere. This third and final film, titled Chihayafuru: Musubi, was released on March 17, 2018. Koizumi returned as director and the main cast reprised their roles. The conclusion of the story, set two years after the events of the first two films, features four new cast members, including Kaya Kiyohara who portrays Io Wagatsuma, a character written exclusively for the film. Kento Kaku appears as Hisashi Suō, Hayato Sano as Akihiro Tsukuba and Mio Yūki as Sumire Hanano.
