= Jun Kunimura =

Japanese actor (born 1955)

Jun Kunimura 國村隼
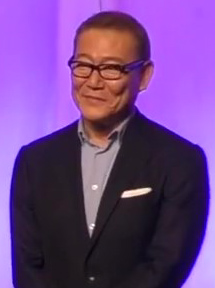
- Jun Kunimura in 2019
- Born: Yoshihiro Yonemura; 15 November 1955 (age 70); Yatsushiro, Kumamoto, Japan
- Occupation: Actor
- Years active: 1976–present

Japanese name
- Kanji: 國村 隼
- Hiragana: くにむら じゅん
- Katakana: クニムラ ジュン
Transcriptions
- Romanization: Kunimura Jun

Japanese name
- Kanji: 米村 喜洋
- Hiragana: よねむら よしひろ
- Katakana: ヨネムラ ヨシヒロ
Transcriptions
- Romanization: Yonemura Yoshihiro

Jun Kunimura (國村 隼, Kunimura Jun; born Yoshihiro Yonemura (米村 喜洋, Yonemura Yoshihiro); November 15, 1955) is a Japanese actor who has acted in Japan, the United States, Hong Kong, and South Korea. He won Best Supporting Actor and the Popular Star Award at the 37th Blue Dragon Film Awards for his performance in the South Korean horror film The Wailing, directed by Na Hong-jin.

== Early life and education ==
Kunimura was born Yoshihiro Yonemura (米村 喜洋 Yonemura Yoshihiro) in Yatsushiro, Kumamoto Prefecture, but his family moved to Amagasaki, Hyōgo Prefecture soon after, before moving again to Osaka when he was two years old. He graduated from a theatre program operated by the Osaka Broadcasting Corporation, a theatre company owned and operated by a local NHK affiliate. He has cited actor Yūsaku Matsuda as an influence.

== Career ==
Kunimura began his acting career with a bit part in Shirō Moritani's 1973 disaster film Tidal Wave. He went on to appear in the TV dramas Ayu no Uta and Yôi don, before holding his first starring role in Kazuyuki Izutsu's Gaki Teikoku. Throughout the late 80s and early 90s, he appeared in a number of Hong Kong-produced films, including a prominent cameo role in John Woo's Hard Boiled, as a Triad gunman in the film's opening teahouse shootout. In 1989, he starred in his first American film, Black Rain. The Ridley Scott-helmed Yakuza action film was shot on-location in Kunimura's hometown of Osaka, and starred his mentor Yūsaku Matsuda.

Kunimura is known internationally for his work in Hollywood with Western directors such as Ridley Scott, Quentin Tarantino, and Roland Emmerich. He has also collaborated with prominent Japanese filmmakers including Takashi Miike, Hideaki Anno, Lee Sang-il, and Ryuhei Kitamura. In 2016, he starred in Na Hong-jin's Korean horror film The Wailing, which earned him critical and popular acclaim. It earned him the Best Supporting Actor and Popular Star Awards at the 37th Blue Dragon Film Awards, making him the first-ever non-Korean and Japanese actor to be nominated for the award.

== Filmography ==
=== Film ===
Year	Title	Role	Notes	Ref.
1973	Tidal Wave	Shoichi		
1981	Gaki Teikoku	Choi		
1989	Black Rain	Yashimoto	1st non-Japanese film	
1991	Au Revoir, Mon Amour	Keiji		
1991	The Blue Jean Monster	Kai		
1991	Ōte	Emisu		
1992	Hard Boiled	Teahouse Gunman	1st Hong Kong Film	
1993	All Under the Moon	Tada		
1994	Treasure Hunt	Yamamoto	2nd Hong Kong Film	
1994	Tokarefu	Det. Takahashi		
1995	Heisei musekinin-ikka: Tokyo de luxe	Yoichi		
1996	Somebody Up There Likes Me	Japanese Trainer	3rd Hong Kong Film	
1997	Suzaku	Kōzō Tahara		
1997	Wild Life	Ijima		
1997	Ningen isu	Shoichiro Shimizu		
1998	Begging for Love	Saburo Wachi		
1998	The Story of PuPu	Kijima		
1999	Keiho	Shibata Toshimitsu		
1999	Audition	Yasuhisa Yoshikawa		
1999	Mayonaka made	Noriyuki		
2000	Ryûsei	Kirishima		
2000	Dokuritsu shônen gasshô-dan	Michio's Father		
2000	Chaos	Inspector Hamaguchi		
2000	Face	Kenta Kariyama		
2000	Gojoe	Suzaku-hougan		
2001	Desert Moon	Kosugi		
2001	Ichi the Killer	Funaki		
2001	Ye long	The Contractor		
2002	Misutâ rûkî	Yang		
2002	Hi wa mata noboru	Koide		
2002	Tomie: Forbidden Fruit	Kazuhiko Hashimoto		
2002	The Laughing Frog	Akio Yoshizumi		
2002	Alive	Kojima		
2002	Sorry	Sei's Father		
2003	Hoshi ni negaio	Jin Kirishima		
2003	Samurai Resurrection	Saemon Jinno		
2003	9 Souls	Yamamoto		
2003	Tsuribaka Nisshi 14	Kawashima		
2003	Kill Bill: Volume 1	Boss Tanaka		
2003	Dead End Run	Jun		
2004	Half a Confession	Manabu Uemura		
2004	Kill Bill: Volume 2	Boss Tanaka		
2004	Kill Bill: The Whole Bloody Affair	Boss Tanaka		
2004	Umizaru	Admiral Masaki Igarashi		
2004	69	Sasaki		
2004	Vital	Hideyoshi Ooyama		
2004	Blood and Bones	Yong-sang Jo		
2004	Lady Joker	Satoru Hirase		
2004	Godzilla: Final Wars	Major Komuro		
2005	Fuyu no Undoukai	Kitazawa Ryousuke		
2005	Lorelei: The Witch of the Pacific Ocean	Matoi Tokioka		
2005	Negotiator: Mashita Masayoshi	Kataoka		
2005	Hanging Garden	Dan Kyobashi		
2006	Limit of Love: Umizaru	Masaki Igarashi		
2006	Hana	Isekan		
2006	Baruto no Gakuen	Takagi		
2006	Sinking of Japan	Kyosuke Nozaki		
2006	Children	Shugoro Kihara		
2006	Tsubakiyama Kacho no Nanokakan	Daisuke Ichikawa		
2007	Three for the Road	Rental Salesman		
2007	Silk	Umon		
2008	Team Batista no Eikō	Gonta Takashina		
2008	Hidden Fortress: The Last Princess	Nagakura		
2008	God's Puzzle	Murakami		
2008	Paco and the Magical Book	Kinomoto		
2008	Yesterdays	Akihiko Yanagida		
2008	K-20: Legend of the Mask	Genji		
2008	Miyagino	Sharaku		
2009	King of the Escape	Kanemura		
2009	Mt. Tsurugidake	Seiichiro Yaguchi		
2010	Saru Lock the Movie	Ogasawara		
2010	After the Flowers	Jinzaemon Terat		
2010	My Darling Is a Foreigner	Noriyuki Oguri		
2010	Sunshine Ahead	Tatsuhei Hiki		
2010	Outrage	Ikemoto		
2010	Here Comes the Bride, My Mom!	Akira Murakami		
2010	Saya Zamurai	The Lord		
2010	Aibou: The Movie II	Muneo Hasegawa		
2011	Synchronicity Shinju Tenshi	Ai's Father		
2011	Moonlight Mask	The Impresario		
2011	Monsters Club	Mr. Kakiuchi		
2012	Reunion	Yoshito Shibata		
2013	A Story of Yonosuke	Mr. Yosano		
2013	The Incredible Truth	Sato Tsuyoshi		
2013	Like Father, Like Son	Kazushi Kamiyama		
2013	The Wind Rises	Hattori (voice)	Japanese-language version	
2013	A Boy Called H	Yoshimura		
2013	Why Don't You Play in Hell?	Muto		
2013	Unforgiven	Masaharu Kitaoji		
2013	Asa Hiru Ban	Asamoto		
2014	Dakishimetai: Shinjitsu no Monogatari	Toshiro		
2014	The World of Kanako	Dr. Tsujimura		
2014	Parasyte: Part 1	Det. Hirama		
2015	Attack on Titan	Kubal / Colossal Titan		
2015	At Home	Genji		
2015	Parasyte: Part 2	Det. Hirama		
2015	The Big Bee	Nakatsuka		
2016	Kokoro	Daisuke		
2016	Chihayafuru Part 1	Hideo Harada		
2016	Chihayafuru Part 2	Hideo Harada		
2016	The Wailing	The Japanese Man	South Korean film	
2016	Shin Godzilla	Chief of Staff Masao Zaizen		
2016	Fueled: The Man They Called Pirate	Takumi Ukawa		
2017	Hamon: Yakuza Boogie	Katsuji Shimada		
2017	Mumon: The Land of Stealth	Kitabatake Tomonori		
2017	JoJo's Bizarre Adventure: Diamond Is Unbreakable Chapter I	Ryohei Higashikata		
2017	Manhunt	Yoshihiro Sakai	Chinese-Hong Kong-Japanese Co-Produced Film	
2017	Fullmetal Alchemist	Tim Marcoh		
2017	Destiny: The Tale of Kamakura	Chief Daibutsu		
2018	Punk Samurai Slash Down	Shuzen Oura		
2018	The Miracle of Crybaby Shottan	Toshio		
2018	Our Departures	Setsuo Okuzono		
2018	Chihayafuru Part 3	Hideo Harada		
2018	Ten Years Japan	Shigeta	Segment: "Itazura dômei"	
2019	The Great War of Archimedes	Marshal Admiral Osami Nagano		
2019	Taro the Fool	Oda		
2019	The Witness	Takashi Hirayama		
2019	Midway	Vice Admiral Chūichi Nagumo		
2020	Step			
2020	Minamata	Junichi Nojima		
2020	Tracing Her Shadow			
2020	Poupelle of Chimney Tow	Dan (voice)		
2021	Kiba: The Fangs of Fiction	Daisaku Nikaidō		
2021	Gift of Fire			
2021	Zokki			
2021	Suicide Forest Village			
2021	Kate	Kijima		
2022	Just Remembering	Nakaido		
2022	I Am Makimoto			
2023	The Roundup: No Way Out	Ichijo-gumi's Chairman	South Korean film	
2023	The Boy and the Heron	The Parakeet King (voice)		
2023	Tokyo Cowboy	Wada		
2024	Bushido	Yorozuya Genbei		
2024	The Yin Yang Master Zero	Kamo no Tadayuki		
2025	Trillion Game	Kazuma Kokuryū		
2026	Golden Kamuy: The Abashiri Prison Raid	Rear Admiral Heiji Koito		
2026	Bad Lieutenant: Tokyo			
2026	The Secret Battlefield	Daido Itakura		
2026	Godzilla Minus Zero	Ogata		

=== Television ===
Year	Title	Role	Notes	Ref.
2000	Aikotoba wa Yūki	Kagetora Anzai		
2008	Andō Natsu	Umekichi Yasuda		
2009	Clouds Over the Hill	Kawakami Soroku		
2009	Kochikame	Kanda Myojin	Episode 1	
2012	Carnation	Kiichi Hanamura	Asadora	
2012	Taira no Kiyomori	Fujiwara no Tadazane	Taiga drama	
2014	Alice no Toge			
2015	Keisei Saimin no Otoko Part 3	Takashi Miki	TV movie	
2016	Shizumanu Taiyō			
2016	Ishikawa Goemon	Toyotomi Hideyoshi		
2017	Hello, Detective Hedgehog			
2019–2021	The Naked Director	Iori Furuya	2 seasons	
2020	Gift of Fire	Bunsaku Arakatsu	TV movie	
2021	Bullets, Bones and Blocked Noses	Section chief	Miniseries	
2021	Japan Sinks: People of Hope	Professor Tōru Sera		
2021	Isoroku Yamamoto in London	Tsuneo Matsudaira	TV movie	
2022	The 13 Lords of the Shogun	Ōba Kagechika	Taiga drama	
2022	Modern Love Tokyo	Yoshimoto	Episode 5	
2023	Trillion Game	Kazuma Kokuryū		
2024	Sunny	Yuki Tanaka		
2025	Asura	Kotaro		
2025	Himitsu – Top Secret	Kiyotaka Kainuma		
2025	The Laughing Salesman	Kataru Kaode	Episode 10	
2025	Simulation: Defeat in the Summer of 1941	Daido Itakura	Miniseries	
2026	Blood and Sweat	Tokuro Suzumiya		
TBA	Shōgun	Goda	Season 2	

== Awards and nominations ==
Year	Award	Category	Nominated work	Result	Ref.
2016	37th Blue Dragon Film Awards	Best Supporting Actor	The Wailing	Won	
2016	37th Blue Dragon Film Awards	Popular Star Award	The Wailing	Won	
2016	25th Buil Film Awards	Best Supporting Actor	The Wailing	Nominated	
2017	11th Asian Film Awards	Best Supporting Actor	The Wailing	Nominated	
