= Masaru Yokoyama =

Japanese composer (born 1982)

Masaru Yokoyama 横山 克
- Born: November 3, 1982 (age 43); Nagano Prefecture, Japan
- Genres: Orchestral; symphonic; classical; J-pop; orchestral pop
- Occupations: Composer; arranger
- Instruments: Keyboard; synthesizer
- Label: Miracle Bus

Masaru Yokoyama (横山 克, Yokoyama Masaru; born November 3, 1982) is a Japanese composer and arranger, known for his work on television dramas and anime series.

== Biography ==
Yokoyama was born in Nagano Prefecture. He started to take piano lessons at the age of three, taught by his aunt who is an alumna of Kunitachi College of Music, but became interested in music when he was in elementary school, after playing his own compositions. When he was in middle school, he began to compose music using a synthesizer that he bought and his computer, and had also briefly played in a band. Interested in computers, Yokoyama attended National Institute of Technology, Nagano College, studying electronic engineering for five years after graduating from middie school.

Influenced by Joe Hisaishi's music in Studio Ghibli's films that he watched when he was young and musician Tetsuya Komuro, Yokoyama decided to pursue a career in music and attended Kunitachi College of Music when he was nineteen, following his aunt's encouragement. While in college, he met guitarist Hiroaki Tsutsumi, who would later work with Yokoyama on many projects. After graduating, Yokoyama worked as a freelancer, writing songs for various artists, before joining the music production company Miracle Bus in 2009, where he began to produce soundtracks for television dramas, anime, and other media. His first work as a sole composer was the 2011 television drama series Mitsu no Aji: A Taste of Honey.

He occasionally records his score overseas, and improvises instruments that would match the concept of each work, such as using buckets and decking brushes as instruments when recording the soundtrack for Mobile Suit Gundam: Iron-Blooded Orphans.

== Works ==
=== Anime ===
Year	Title	Note(s)	Ref(s)
2006	Mamoru-kun ni Megami no Shukufuku o!	insert song "Eien no Koi"	
2007	KimiKiss: Pure Rouge	with Hikaru Nanase and Noriyuki Iwadare	
2009	Queen's Blade: The Exiled Virgin		
2009	Queen's Blade 2: The Evil Eye		
2010	Amagami SS	ending theme "Kitto Ashita wa..."	
2010	Arakawa Under the Bridge		
2011	Freezing		
2011	Hen Semi		
2011	Battle Girls: Time Paradox	arranged the ending theme "Atsuki Ya no Gotoku"	
2011	Maken-ki!	ending themes	
2012	Queen's Blade Rebellion		
2012	Place to Place		
2012	Joshiraku		
2013	Hyperdimension Neptunia: The Animation	with Kenji Kaneko and Hiroaki Tsutsumi	
2013	Freezing Vibration		
2013	I Couldn't Become a Hero, So I Reluctantly Decided to Get a Job	with Hiroaki Tsutsumi	
2013	Unbreakable Machine-Doll		
2014	Nobunaga the Fool		
2014	Nobunaga Concerto		
2014	Lord Marksman and Vanadis	with Nobuaki Nobusawa	
2014	Your Lie in April		
2015	The Rolling Girls		
2015	Plastic Memories		
2015	Yamada-kun and the Seven Witches	also OVA in 2014	
2015	Rampo Kitan: Game of Laplace		
2015	Mobile Suit Gundam: Iron-Blooded Orphans		
2016	The Lost Village		
2016	BBK/BRNK		
2016	WWW.Working!!		
2016	Monster Hunter Stories: Ride On		
2016	Occultic;Nine		
2017	Interviews with Monster Girls		
2017	Akiba's Trip: The Animation	opening theme "Ikken Rakuchaku Goyoujin"	
2017	Scum's Wish		
2017	Kabukibu!		
2017	Seven Mortal Sins	with Hiroaki Tsutsumi	
2017	Fate/Apocrypha		
2017	Love and Lies	with Nobuaki Nobusawa	
2018	Monster Strike the Animation	with Hiroaki Tsutsumi, Nobuaki Nobusawa, and Moe Hyūga	
2018	Sirius the Jaeger		
2018	Boarding School Juliet		
2018	Dakaichi		
2019	Fruits Basket		
2019	Astra Lost in Space	with Nobuaki Nobusawa	
2020	Drifting Dragons		
2020	A3!	with Kana Hashiguchi	
2020	The Gymnastics Samurai		
2020	Magatsu Wahrheit -Zuerst-		
2021	Horimiya		
2021	Farewell, My Dear Cramer		
2022	Aoashi		
2022	Classroom of the Elite Season 2	with Kana Hashiguchi	
2022	Urusei Yatsura		
2023	Tomo-chan Is a Girl!		
2023	Tsurune: The Linking Shot		
2023	Mashle		
2024	Classroom of the Elite Season 3	with Kana Hashiguchi	
2024	'Tis Time for "Torture," Princess		
2024	Jellyfish Can't Swim in the Night		
2024	Rising Impact		
2025	Flower and Asura		
2025	Dealing with Mikadono Sisters Is a Breeze		
2026	Hana-Kimi		
2026	Classroom of the Elite Season 4	with Kana Hashiguchi	
2026	The Ogre's Bride		
2026	Tank Chair		
2027	Dengeki Daisy		

=== Anime films ===
Year	Title	Note(s)	Ref(s)
2012	Buta		
2015	The Anthem of the Heart	with Mito	
2016	Garakowa: Restore the World		
2018	Monster Strike The Movie: Sora no Kanata		
2019	Blackfox	with Kana Hashiguchi	
2019	Her Blue Sky		
2021	Farewell, My Dear Cramer: First Touch		
2021	Dakaichi: Spain Arc		
2022	Fruits Basket: Prelude		
2022	Tsurune: The Movie – The First Shot		
2022	Break of Dawn		
2023	Gekijōban Collar × Malice Deep Cover		
2023	Maboroshi		
2024	Trapezium		
2024	Umamusume: Pretty Derby – Beginning of a New Era		
2024	Fureru	with TeddyLoid	

=== Television dramas ===
Year	Title	Broadcast channel	Note(s)	Ref(s)
2009	Ijin no Kuru Heya	Tokyo MX		
2010	Taxmen	Tokyo MX		
2010	Hammer Session!	TBS	with Audio Highs	
2011	Hanawake no Yon Shimai	TBS	with Yuko Fukushima and Eishi Segawa	
2011	Mitsu no Aji: A Taste of Honey	Fuji TV		
2012	Perfect Son	NTV		
2012	Answer ~ Keishicho Kensho Sosakan	TV Asahi		
2012	Nekoben ~ Shitai no Minoshirokin	TBS		
2012	Ren'ai Kentei	NHK		
2012	My Little Nightmare	NTV		
2012	Odessa no Kaidan	Fuji TV	ending theme	
2013	Yakou Kanransha	TBS		
2013	Nekoben to Toumei Ningen	TBS		
2013	35-sai no Koukousei	NTV		
2013	Na mo Naki Doku	TBS		
2013	Nanatsu no Kaigi	NHK		
2013	Honey Trap	Fuji TV		
2013	Tenshi to Jump	NHK		
2014	Fukuie Keibuho no Aisatsu	Fuji TV		
2014	Alice no Toge	TBS		
2014	Peter no Souretsu	TBS		
2014	Jigoku Sensei Nūbē	NTV		
2014	N no Tame ni	TBS		
2015	Masshiro	TBS	with Masato Suzuki	
2015	Tatakau! Shoten Garu	Fuji TV		
2015	Napoleon no Mura	TBS		
2015	Kekkonshiki no Zenjitsu ni	TBS		
2016	Boku no Yabai Tsuma	Fuji TV		
2016	Suna no Tou ~ Shirisugita Rinjin	TBS		
2017	Reverse	TBS		
2017	Warotenka	NHK		
2018	Holiday Love	TV Asahi		
2018	Zettai Reido Season 3	Fuji TV		
2019	Keiji Zero	Fuji TV	with Evan Call	
2019	Kami no Te	Wowow		
2020	Zettai Reido Season 4	Fuji TV		
2020	Top Knife: Tensai Nougekai no Joken	NTV	with Masato Suzuki	
2020	O Maidens in Your Savage Season	MBS, TBS		
2021	Dream Team	NHK		
2021	Nemesis	NTV		
2021	Dearest	TBS		
2021	Our Rainy Days	NHK		
2022	Itoshii Uso: Yasashii Yami	TV Asahi		
2022	Jun'ai Dissonance	Fuji TV		
2023	Dr. Chocolate	NTV		
2023	Nukarumi no Shokutaku	TV Asahi		
2023–24	Ao Haru Ride	Wowow	2 seasons	
2025	The Reluctant Preacher	NTV		
2025	Chihayafuru: Full Circle	NTV		
2025	Passing the Reins	TBS		

=== Live-action films ===
Year	Title	Note(s)	Ref(s)
2011	Inu to Anata no Monogatari	with Remedios and Masamichi Shigeno	
2011	High School Debut	with Kei Yoshikawa	
2011	Hayabusa	additional music	
2014	My Little Nightmare: The Movie		
2015	No Longer Heroine		
2016	Chihayafuru: Kami no Ku		
2016	Chihayafuru: Shimo no Ku		
2017	Memoirs of a Murderer		
2017	The Anthem of the Heart		
2017	Miseinen Dakedo Kodomo Janai		
2018	Chihayafuru: Musubi		
2018	Real Girl		
2018	Cafe Funiculi Funicula		
2020	AI Amok		
2020	Yowamushi Pedal		
2022	Sen wa, Boku wo Egaku		
2023	Nemesis: The Movie		
2023	You Made My Dawn		
2025	Unforgettable		
2025	10Dance		

=== Other projects ===
Year	Title	Note(s)	Ref(s)
2008	Darling / Yui Horie	"Little Honey Bee"	
2010	Nura: Rise of the Yokai Clan Character CD Series: Rikuo Nura / Zen	"Rikuo, Kaze wo Hiku"	
2011	100 Pun de Meicho	NHK's television program; main theme	
2011	Sakanobori Nippon Shi	NHK's television program; main theme	
2011	Mirai Bowl / Chai Maxx / Momoiro Clover	"Chai Maxx"	
2011	Nura: Rise of the Yokai Clan Character CD Series: Gozumaru & Mezumaru / Gyuki	"Don't Stop Till The End"	
2011	Astarotte no Omocha! Character Song CD Vol.1 Astarotte Ygval x Judit Snorrevik	arranged "So Janai!?"	
2011	Wide! Scramble	TV Asahi's television program; main theme	
2011	Astarotte no Omocha! Character Song CD Vol.2 Naoya Tohara x Asuha Tohara	arranged "Daitan♪Girl"	
2011	Sengoku Otome Utage Takenawa	"Densetsu ga Umareru made"	
2011	Ano Hito	NHK FM's radio program	
2011	D' no Junjō / Momoiro Clover Z		
2012	Amagami SS+ plus (Anime) Character Songs w/ O.S.T always Vol.01	arranged "Your Smile"	
2012	Amagami SS+ plus (Anime) Character Songs w/ O.S.T always Vol.02	arranged "Mafuyu no Serenade"	
2012	Mōretsu Uchū Kōkyōkyoku Dai 7 Gakushō "Mugen no Ai" / Momoiro Clover Z	arranged "DNA Kyōshikyoku"	
2012	Steins;Gate Symphonic Material	arrangements with several others	
2012	Honoo-no Taiiku-kai TV	TBS's television program; main theme	
2012	Where I Belong / Himeka		
2012	Family History	NHK's documentary; opening theme	
2012	Bokura no Century / Momoiro Clover Z	"Sora no Curtain"	
2013	Hero-tachi no Shoubu	NHK's documentary; main theme	
2013	5th Dimension / Momoiro Clover Z	"Jōkyu Monogatari -Carpe Diem-"	
2013	Overseas Network	NHK's television program	
2013	Close-up Gendai	NHK's television program	
2013	Save / Meg		
2013	Occultic;Nine	promotional video	
2013	Steins;Gate Symphonic Reunion	arrangements with several others	
2013	Masaru Yokoyama NHK Works	compilation album	
2013	Jump!!!!! / Twinkle5		
2014	Watashi... Fukō Guse / Vanilla Beans	"Koi no Snipper 007"	
2014	Energy No Honryu	NHK's documentary	
2014	Etrian Odyssey 2 Untold: The Fafnir Knight	video game; arranged "Reaching out for our future"	
2014	Chai Maxx Zero / Momoiro Clover Z		
2015	Seimei Daiyakushin	NHK's documentary	
2016	Hakkin no Yoake / Momoiro Clover Z	"Hakkin no Yoake"	
2016	Jakuchu Tensai Eshi no Nazo ni Semaru	NHK's documentary	
2017	Dragon, Dance with Wolves	stage play	
2018	NHK Dame Jiman ~Minna ga Deru Terebi~	NHK's television program	
2019	Boléro IV ~New Breath~ Harunanoni / Tomotaka Okamoto	arrangements	
2019	Magatsu Wahrheit	video game; with several others	
2020	Sister Cities / Saori Hayami	"mist"	
2021	Shuumatsu no Akasha	video game	
2022	Noah's Heart	video game	
2022	Masaru Yokoyama NHK Works 2	compilation album	
