= Tokyo Sports Film Award for Best Supporting Actress =

Japanese film award

- Awarded for: Best Performance by a Supporting Actress
- Country: Japan
- Presented by: Tokyo Sports
- First award: 1991
- Website: www.tokyo-sports.co.jp/tospo_movie/

The Tokyo Sports Film Award for Best Supporting Actress is an award given at the Tokyo Sports Film Award.

== List of winners ==
No.	Year	Actor(s)	Film(s)
1	1991	Kaori Sugano	
2	1992	Keiko Matsuzaka	
3	1993	Aya Kokumai	
4	1994	Keiko Saitō	
5	1995	Bandō Tamasaburō	
6	1996	N/A	N/A
7	1997	Mitsuko Baisho	
8	1998	Kayoko Kishimoto	
9	1999	Erika Oda	
10	2000	Michiyo Okusu	Face
11	2001	Shinobu Otake	
12	2002	Miho Kanno	
13	2003	Michiyo Okusu	Zatōichi
14	2004	Tomoko Tabata	Blood and Bones
15	2005	N/A	N/A
16	2006	Sumiko Fuji	Hula Girls
17	2007	Haruko Kato	Tamashii Moe!
18	2008	Kirin Kiki	Still Walking
19	2009	Kyoko Fukada	Yatterman
20	2010	Yui Natsukawa	The Lone Scalpel
21	2011	N/A	N/A
22	2012	N/A	N/A
23	2013	Fumi Nikaidō	Why Don't You Play in Hell? Shijūkunichi no Recipe
24	2014	Yuko Oshima	Pale Moon
25	2015	Masami Nagasawa	Umimachi Diary
26	2016	Suzu Hirose	Rage
27	2017	Suzu Hirose; Yuki Saito	The Third Murder
28	2018	Mayu Matsuoka	Shoplifters
