= Kaya Kiyohara =

Japanese actress (born 2002)

- 清原 果耶
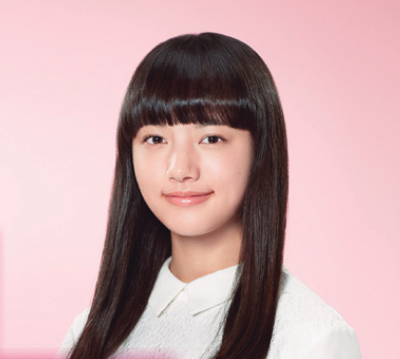
- Kiyohara in 2017
- Born: January 30, 2002 (age 24); Osaka, Japan
- Occupations: Actress, model
- Years active: 2015–present
- Agent: Amuse Inc.

Kaya Kiyohara (清原 果耶, Kiyohara Kaya; born January 30, 2002) is a Japanese actress, model and singer. She won the Best Supporting Actress award at the 45th Japan Academy Film Prize for the film In The Wake.

== Biography ==
Born in Osaka, Kiyohara joined Amuse Inc. in 2014. She has since starred in a number of dramas and films over the years. She made a cameo appearance in the film My Tomorrow, Your Yesterday. Kiyohara had supporting roles in the live-action films, March Comes In like a Lion and March Goes Out like a Lamb. She gained further recognition when she starred in the final part of the Chihayafuru live-action trilogy, Chihayafuru Part 3. She had a cameo for We Made A Beautiful Bouquet, which is the 8th highest grossing Japanese film of 2021. Kiyohara starred in NHK's 104th asadora, Welcome Home, Monet, and won the Best Supporting Actress award at the 45th Japan Academy Film Prize for the film In The Wake. She also starred in the 2024 film 18×2 Beyond Youthful Days which was one of her best performances.

== Filmography ==
=== Film ===
Year	Title	Role	Notes	Ref.
2015	Typhoon Noruda	Noruda (voice)		
2016	My Tomorrow, Your Yesterday	15-year-old Emi		
2017	March Comes in Like a Lion	Hinata Kawamoto		
2017	March Goes out Like a Lamb	Hinata Kawamoto		
2017	Yurigokoro	Young Misako		
2018	Chihayafuru Part 3	Iori Wagatsuma		
2019	Aiuta: My Promise to Nakuhito	Nagi Itō		
2019	Day and Night	Nana Ōno		
2019	Strawberry Song	Young Chika		
2020	The Brightest Roof in the Universe	Tsubame Ōishi	Lead role	
2020	Hope	Miyabi Ishikawa		
2020	Josee, the Tiger and the Fish	Josee (voice)	Lead role	
2021	The Door into Summer	Riko Matsushita		
2021	You're Not Normal, Either	Kasumi Akimoto	Lead role	
2021	My Blood & Bones in a Flowing Galaxy	Ozaki (younger)		
2021	We Made a Beautiful Bouquet	Rin Hada		
2021	In the Wake	Mikiko Maruyama		
2022	The Lines That Define Me	Chiaki Shinoda		
2023	One Second Ahead, One Second Behind	Reika Chōsokabe	Lead role	
2024	Bushido	Okinu		
2024	18×2 Beyond Youthful Days	Ami	Lead role; Taiwanese-Japanese film	
2025	Unreachable	Sakura	Lead role	

=== Television ===
Year	Title	Role	Notes	Ref.
2015–16	Here Comes Asa!	Fuyu and Natsu	Asadora	
2016	Moribito: Guardian of the Spirit	Young Balsa		
2017	Seto and Utsumi	Ichigo Kashimura		
2018	Switched	Ayumi Kohinata		
2018	An Invisible Cradle	Aoi Aota	Lead role	
2019	Hotarugusa	Nana	Lead role	
2019	Mango no Ki no Shita de	Young Rinko	Lead role; TV movie	
2019	Poison Daughter, Holy Mother	Yukina Amano	Lead role; episode 3	
2019	Natsuzora: Natsu's Sky	Chiharu Okuhara	Asadora	
2019	If Talking Paid	Harumi Akiba		
2021	Welcome Home, Monet	Momone "Monet" Nagaura	Lead role; Asadora	
2022	Fight Song	Hanae Kisara	Lead role	
2022	Medium	Hisui Jōzuka	Lead role; miniseries	
2022	Invert	Hisui Jōzuka	Lead role; miniseries	
2024	My Diary	Yuki Onomura	Lead role	
2025	Last Samurai Standing	Iroha Kinugasa		
2025	Love Is for the Dogs	Aiko Hanamura	Lead role	

=== Music video appearances ===
Year	Song	Artist	Ref.
2015	Wataridori	Alexandros	

== Awards and nominations ==
Year	Award	Category	Work(s)	Result	Ref.
2019	12th Tokyo Drama Awards	Best Actress	An Invisible Cradle	Won	
2019	32nd Nikkan Sports Film Awards	Best Newcomer	Aiuta: My Promise to Nakuhito, Day and Night, Strawberry Song	Won	
2020	62nd Blue Ribbon Awards	Best Newcomer	Aiuta: My Promise to Nakuhito, Day and Night, Strawberry Song	Nominated	
2020	44th Elan d'or Awards	Newcomer of the Year	Herself	Won	
2021	34th Nikkan Sports Film Awards	Best Supporting Actress	In the Wake and the others	Won	
2022	76th Mainichi Film Awards	Best Supporting Actress	In the Wake	Won	
2022	64th Blue Ribbon Awards	Best Supporting Actress	In the Wake	Nominated	
2022	45th Japan Academy Film Prize	Best Supporting Actress	In the Wake	Won	
2022	19th Asian Film Festival	Best Actress	In the Wake	Won	
2025	48th Japan Academy Film Prize	Best Supporting Actress	Bushido	Nominated	
