= Miyuki Matsuda =

Japanese actress (born 1961)

- Born: October 6, 1961 (age 64); Tokyo, Japan
- Years active: 1979–present
- Spouse: Yūsaku Matsuda (m. 1983–1989)
- Children: 3, including Ryuhei Matsuda and Shota Matsuda
- Relatives: Mami Kumagai (sister)

Miyuki Matsuda (松田美由紀, Matsuda Miyuki; born October 6, 1961) is a Japanese actress, the widow of Yūsaku Matsuda, and the sister of Mami Kumagai.

At the age of 17 she appeared in a television series, Tantei Monogatari, starring Yūsaku Matsuda, who was then married. They started a relationship and, after Masuda divorced his first wife, Michiko, they married in 1983. Their son Ryuhei Matsuda was born that year. They had two more children: a second son, Shota Matsuda, born in 1985, and a daughter, Yūki Matsuda, born in 1988.

She appeared as Ryo Ishibashi's dead wife in the movie Audition (1999). In 2009 she was the executive producer for the documentary Soul Red: Yusaku Matsuda about her husband's life and death.

In 2008, she published a book of photographs of the model Hitomi Katayama, Watakushi no suki na kodoku.

== Filmography ==
=== Film ===
- Kindaichi Kosuke no Boken (1979) (as Miyuki Kumagai)
- Elephant Song (1994)
- Genki no Kamisama (1997)
- Nodo Jiman (1998)
- Rebirth of Mothra III (1998)
- Yomigaeru yusaku: Tantei monogatari tokubetsu hen (1999)
- Ano natsu no hi (1999)
- Audition (1999) as Ryoko Aoyama
- Kuroe (2001)
- Pakodate-jin (2002)
- Boutaoshi! (2003)
- Riyu (2004)
- Zoo (2005)
- Sekai wa tokidoki utsukushii (2007)
- Tokyo Tower: Mom and Me, and Sometimes Dad (2007)
- Hannin ni tsugu (2007)
- Shibuya (2010)
- Made in Japan: Kora! (2011)
- Still the Water (2014)
- Hot Road (2014)
- Love & Peace (2015)
- Chihayafuru Part 1 (2016) as Taeko Miyauchi
- Chihayafuru Part 2 (2016) as Taeko Miyauchi
- Chihayafuru Part 3 (2018) as Taeko Miyauchi
- Blind Witness (2019)

=== Television ===
- Tokyo Vice (2022)
