= Bad Lieutenant: Tokyo =

2026 action-thriller film by Takashi Miike

- Japanese teaser poster

Japanese name
- Kanji: バッド・ルーテナント:トウキョウ
Transcriptions
- Romanization: Baddo Rūtenanto: Tōkyō
- Directed by: Takashi Miike
- Written by: Daisuke Tengan
- Based on: Bad Lieutenant by: Zoë Lund; Abel Ferrara
- Produced by: Jeremy Thomas; Sam Pressman; Naoaki Kitajima; Misako Saka
- Starring: Shun Oguri; Lily James; Shotaro Mamiya; Liv Morgan; Jun Kunimura; Hiroshi Tachi
- Cinematography: Nobuyasu Kita
- Edited by: Naoichiro Sagara
- Music by: Koji Endo
- Production companies: Nippon TV; Pressman Film; Recorded Picture Company; OLM; TF1 Films
- Distributed by: Neon (United States); Sony Pictures Entertainment Japan (Japan)
- Release dates: September 14, 2026 (TIFF); October 23, 2026 (Japan)
- Running time: 108 minutes
- Countries: United States; United Kingdom; Japan; France
- Languages: English; Japanese

Bad Lieutenant: Tokyo (Japanese: バッド・ルーテナント:トウキョウ) is a 2026 action thriller film directed by Takashi Miike and written by Daisuke Tengan. A co-production of the United States, United Kingdom, Japan, and France, it is the third installment in the Bad Lieutenant film series, following Bad Lieutenant (1992) and Bad Lieutenant: Port of Call New Orleans (2009), and stars Shun Oguri, Lily James, Shotaro Mamiya, Liv Morgan, Jun Kunimura, and Hiroshi Tachi.

The film had its world premiere at the 2026 Toronto International Film Festival on September 14, and was released in Japan by Sony Pictures Entertainment Japan on October 23. It received mixed reviews from critics.

== Premise ==
A Tokyo police officer, and compulsive gambler, becomes involved in a complex investigation when a mysterious FBI agent arrives in Japan following the disappearance of a politician's daughter.

== Cast ==
- Shun Oguri
- Lily James
- Shotaro Mamiya
- Liv Morgan
- Shūhei Nomura
- Nanase Nishino
- Yuka Kouri
- Takanori Iwata
- Keisuke Watanabe
- Hideo Nakano
- Jun Murakami
- Jun Kunimura
- Hiroshi Tachi (Special appearance)

== Production ==
=== Development ===
In July 2021, film producer Edward R. Pressman announced in collaboration with his son Sam Pressman that a series of sequels set in various locations around the world including the United Kingdom, Germany, Italy, South Korea, Argentina, and France are in development. The filmmakers confirmed that work on the scripts is ongoing with foreign studios also collaborating on the projects; explaining that each script will follow corrupt law enforcement in different geographical locations.

By April of 2025, a third installment titled Bad Lieutenant: Tokyo was officially announced as being in development. Directed by Takashi Miike from a script written by Daisuke Tengan, the plot centers around a Tokyo Metropolitan Police Officer who is involved in corrupt gambling and finds himself being investigated by an FBI agent for the disappearance of the daughter of a political figure. All the while, a deviant killer who operates in yakuza underworld follows each of their actions. Principal photography commenced in May of the same year; Shun Oguri stars as the next titular character, with the supporting cast including Lily James, and Liv Morgan. CEO of Pressman Films, Sam Pressman stated: "Director Miike brings a fearless new vision to the Bad Lieutenant, a character defined by the auteur. Just as maestros Ferrara and Herzog delivered films as radically different as their own voices, Miike’s adaptation is unrelentingly wild and unique. My father Edward R. Pressman, always believed this story of corruption, both of police and the human soul, has a global resonance. To realize this next evolution now in Tokyo...is both an honor and a dream come true.”

The project is a joint-venture production between Japan and U.S. film studios including Pressman Films, Recorded Picture Company, Nippon TV, TF1, and OLM; while Neon will act as the distributing company. Jeremy Thomas, Sam Pressman, Naoaki Kitajima, and Misako Saka serve as producers.

=== Filming ===
Principal photography and initial filming took place in Japan in May 2025.

== Marketing ==
In March of 2026, marketing commenced with the first official movie poster released in Japan.

== Release ==
Bad Lieutenant: Tokyo premiered at the Toronto International Film Festival on September 14, 2026, and was released on October 23, 2026 in Japan.

== Reception ==
On review aggregator Rotten Tomatoes, the film holds an approval rating of 39% based on 18 reviews, with an average rating of 5.6/10. On Metacritic, the film has a weighted average score of 46 out of 100, based on 9 critics, indicating "mixed or average reviews".
