= Chihayafuru Part 1 =

Chihayafuru: Kami no Ku
- Poster

Japanese name
- Kanji: ちはやふる 上の句
- Directed by: Norihiro Koizumi
- Screenplay by: Norihiro Koizumi
- Based on: Chihayafuru by Yuki Suetsugu
- Produced by: Naoaki Kitajima
- Starring: Suzu Hirose; Shūhei Nomura; Mackenyu; Mone Kamishiraishi; Yūma Yamoto; Yūki Morinaga; Hiroya Shimizu; Miyuki Matsuda; Jun Kunimura
- Cinematography: Hiro'o Yanagida
- Edited by: Jun'nosuke Hogaki
- Music by: Masaru Yokoyama
- Production companies: Nippon TV; Toho; Kodansha; Robot Communications; Yomiuri Telecasting Corporation; Dentsu; East Japan Marketing & Communications; KDDI Corporation; GyaO; Sapporo Television Broadcasting; Miyagi Television Broadcasting; Shizuoka Daiichi Television; Chūkyō Television Broadcasting; Hiroshima Telecasting; Fukuoka Broadcasting System; Fukui Broadcasting
- Distributed by: Toho
- Release date: March 19, 2016
- Running time: 111 minutes
- Country: Japan
- Language: Japanese
- Box office: ¥1.63 billion

Chihayafuru: Kami no Ku (Japanese: ちはやふる 上の句; lit. 'Chihayafuru: Upper Phrase') is a 2016 Japanese sports romantic teen drama film written and directed by Norihiro Koizumi and starring Suzu Hirose, Shūhei Nomura, Mackenyu, Mone Kamishiraishi, Yūma Yamoto, Yūki Morinaga, Hiroya Shimizu, Miyuki Matsuda and Jun Kunimura. It is the first of three live action film adaptations of the manga series Chihayafuru, written and illustrated by Yuki Suetsugu. The film was released in Japan by Toho on March 19, 2016. It was followed by Chihayafuru: Shimo no Ku, released in Japan on April 29, 2016. Chihayafuru: Musubi, the third and final film in the series, was released in Japan on March 17, 2018.

== Plot ==
In elementary school, Chihaya Ayase forms a bond, through competitive karuta, with two of her Tokyo classmates; recent Fukui transfer student Arata Wataya and Taichi Mashima, her childhood friend. Arata is a prodigious karuta player whose dream is to become Meijin, the men's division karuta champion in Japan, equivalent to the women's division Queen title. He believes that Chihaya has the potential to become a great player. Inspired, Chihaya commits to a new dream, becoming Japan's best karuta player. Not content with only participating in their school's tournament, the trio team up and join a local karuta society. They are soon separated, at the end of primary school, when Arata moves back to Fukui while Taichi and Chihaya enrol in different middle schools. but not before promising each other to remain connected through karuta. In her first year in high school, karuta obsessed Chihaya is reunited with Taichi, when she is recruiting students to join her for karuta competitions. Together, they form the Mizusawa Karuta Club. Participation in tournaments enables them to reconnect with Arata. Unbeknownst to Chihaya, the two boys have fallen in love with her. With her teammates and friends supporting her, Chihaya continues to strive to become the best karuta player in the world, while forging relationships with other players.

== Cast ==
- Suzu Hirose as Chihaya Ayase
- Shūhei Nomura as Taichi Mashima
- Mackenyu as Arata Wataya
- Mone Kamishiraishi as Kanade Ōe
- Yūma Yamoto as Yūsei Nishida
- Yūki Morinaga as Tsutomu Komano
- Hiroya Shimizu as Akihito Sudō
- Mayu Matsuoka as Shinobu Wakamiya
- Miyuki Matsuda as Taeko Miyauchi
- Jun Kunimura as Harada Hideo
- Ryōtarō Sakaguchi as Hiro Kinashi
- Alice Hirose as Chitose Ayase, Chihaya's sister (cameo)
- Masane Tsukayama as Hajime Wataya

== Production ==
The film was shot at the Omi Shrine in Shiga Prefecture. The theme song of the film is "FLASH" by the Japanese group Perfume. The original soundtracks are composed by Masaru Yokoyama.

== Release ==
The release date of the film was announced in December 2015 for March 19, 2016.

== Reception ==
The film reached the fourth place by admissions at the Japanese box office on its opening weekend, with 146,299 admissions and a gross of ¥179 million.

== Sequels ==
A sequel, titled Chihayafuru: Shimo no Ku, was released in Japan on April 29, 2016. Another sequel was announced at Chihayafuru: Shimo no Ku's premiere. This third and final film, titled Chihayafuru: Musubi, was released on March 17, 2018.

== Awards ==
Year	Award ceremony	Category	Recipients	Result
2016	41st Hochi Film Award	Best Picture	Chihayafuru	Nominated
2016	41st Hochi Film Award	Best Director	Norihiro Koizumi	Nominated
2016	41st Hochi Film Award	Best Actress	Suzu Hirose	Nominated
2016	41st Hochi Film Award	Best Supporting Actress	Mayu Matsuoka	Nominated
2016	41st Hochi Film Award	Best New Artist	Mayu Matsuoka	Nominated
2016	41st Hochi Film Award	Best New Artist	Mackenyu	Nominated
2017	40th Japan Academy Prize	Best Actress	Suzu Hirose	Nominated
2017	40th Japan Academy Prize	Newcomer of the Year	Mackenyu	Won
