= Made in Japan: Kora! =

- DVD cover
- Directed by: Banmei Takahashi
- Written by: Chihiro Wama
- Produced by: Banmei Takahashi; Tatsuya Yamamoto
- Starring: Miyuki Matsuda; Kazuhiro Yamaji; Reina Asami; Chieko Matsubara
- Cinematography: Shinji Ogawa
- Music by: Kenta Harada
- Release date: October 1, 2011 (Japan)
- Running time: 84 minutes
- Country: Japan
- Language: Japanese

Made in Japan: Kora! (Japanese: MADE IN JAPAN 〜こらッ!〜) is a 2011 Japanese drama film directed by Banmei Takahashi.

== Cast ==
- Miyuki Matsuda
- Kazuhiro Yamaji
- Reina Asami
- Chieko Matsubara
