= Reina Asami =

Japanese actress and model

- 浅見 れいな
- Born: June 7, 1983 (age 43); Higashimurayama, Tokyo, Japan
- Occupations: Actress, model
- Years active: 1998 - present
- Height: 1.66 m (5 ft 5 1/2 in)
- Children: 2

Reina Asami (浅見 れいな, Asami Reina; born June 7, 1983, in Higashimurayama, Tokyo, Japan) is a Japanese actress and model who is affiliated with LesPros Entertainment.

== Filmography ==
=== TV series ===
Year	Title	Role	Network	Other notes
1999	Great Teacher Onizuka	Moe Saito	Kansai	Special
1999	Psychometer Eiji	Meg	NTV	
2000	Bakayaro! I'm Plenty Mad		NTV	Special
2003	Boku no Ikiru Michi	Rina Suzuki	Kansai	
2003	SMAP×SMAP		Kansai	Special Edition
2004	Water Boys 2	Kayo Oba	Fuji TV	
2005	Brother Beat	Ai Kudō	TBS	
2006	Tree of Heaven	Maya Hoshino	SBS	
2006	Attention Please	Rina Kubota	Fuji TV	Episode 7
2006	Suppli	Yuri Watanabe	Fuji TV	
2007	Hotaru no Hikari	Minako Sono	NTV	
2007	Mop Girl	Bina Okouchi	TV Asahi	
2008	One-pound Gospel	Natsuki Makino	NTV	Episode 2
2009	Drifting Net Cafe	Yukie Toki	Mainichi Broadcasting System	
2009	Atashinchi no Danshi	Saki	Fuji TV	
2009	Tokyo Dogs	Eri Matsunaga	Fuji TV	
2010	The Wallflower	Tamao Kikunoi	TBS	Episode 8
2010	General Rouge no Gaisen	Yayoi Kuriyama	Kansai	
2011	Saijō no Meii	Kana Shinmaru	TV Tokyo	Episode 9
2011	Full Throttle Girl	Ririka	Fuji TV	
2012	Aibō	Akane Suga	TV Asahi	Season 10, Final Episode
2014	Is There a Vet in the House?	Emi Tamura	Yomiuri TV, NTV	Episode 2

=== Films ===
Year	Title	Role	Other notes
1999	Naoko	Yuki	
2006	Limit of Love: Umizaru	Shihori Otobe	
2011	Made in Japan: Kora!		
2014	Princess Jellyfish		
2018	Last Winter, We Parted	Akari Kiharazaka	
