= Mayu Matsuoka =

Japanese actress (born 1995)

- 松岡 茉優
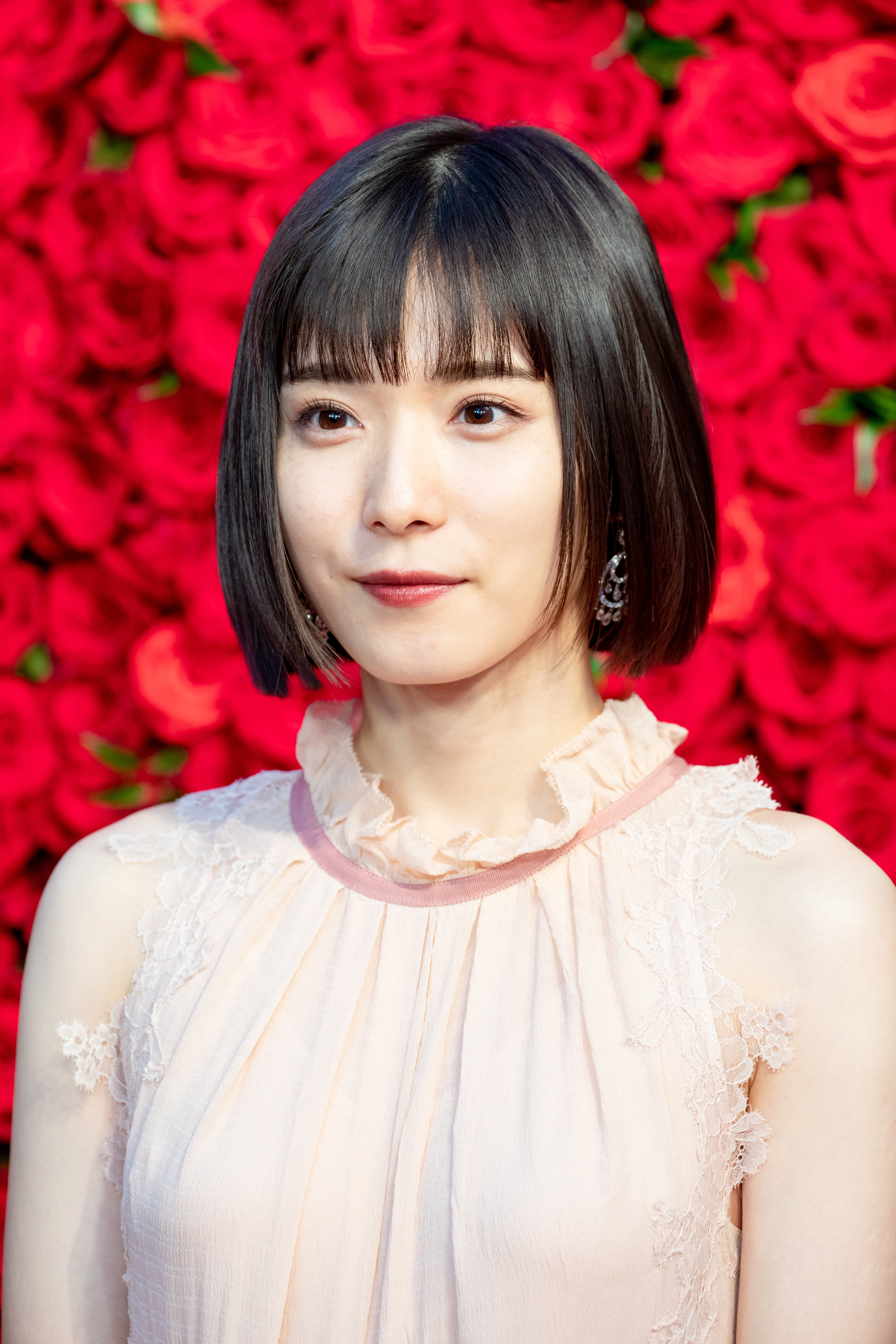
- Matsuoka at the 2018 Tokyo International Film Festival
- Born: February 16, 1995 (age 31); Tokyo, Japan
- Occupation: Actress
- Years active: 2004–present
- Agent: Don-crew
- Known for: The Kirishima Thing; Amachan
- Spouse: Daiki Arioka (m. 2024)

Mayu Matsuoka (松岡 茉優, Matsuoka Mayu; born February 16, 1995) is a Japanese actress.

She has been awarded the Tama best Emerging Actress Award and Fumiko Yamaji Freshman Actress Award in 2016. She gained international attention as an ambassador of the Tokyo International Film Festival for 2017 and her role in the Palme d’Or winning film Shoplifters.

== Personal life ==
On June 7, 2024, Matsuoka announced her marriage to Hey! Say! JUMP member Daiki Arioka.

== Filmography ==
=== Film ===
Year	Title	Role	Notes	Ref.
2006	Akiba			
2008	Love Exposure	Yuri		
2012	Potechi	Miyu		
2012	The Kirishima Thing	Sana		
2012	Lesson of the Evil	Satomi Shirai		
2013	Suzuki Sensei: The Movie	Nanami Horinouchi		
2013	Zekkyō Gakkyū	Erika Katori		
2013	Dawn of a Filmmaker: The Keisuke Kinoshita Story	Yaeko		
2014	Little Forest: Summer & Autumn	Kikko		
2014	Samu Life	Yumi		
2015	Strayer's Chronicle	Momo		
2015	Little Forest: Winter & Spring	Kikko		
2016	Cats Don't Come When You Call	Ume-san		
2016	Chihayafuru Part 2	Shinobu Wakamiya		
2016	Pokémon the Movie: Volcanion and the Mechanical Marvel	Chymia (voice)		
2016	A Silent Voice	Young Shōya (voice)		
2017	Blank13	Kōji's girlfriend		
2017	Tremble All You Want	Yoshika Etō	Lead role	
2018	Chihayafuru Part 3	Shinobu Wakamiya		
2018	Shoplifters	Aki Shibata		
2019	Listen to the Universe	Aya Eiden	Lead role	
2019	The Wonderland	Akane (voice)	Lead role	
2019	One Night	Sonoko		
2020	Theatre: A Love Story	Saki	Lead role	
2020	Digimon Adventure: Last Evolution Kizuna	Menoa Bellucci (voice)		
2021	Kiba: The Fangs of Fiction	Megumi Takano		
2022	Doraemon: Nobita's Little Star Wars 2021	Piina (voice)		
2022	Hell Dogs	Emiri Kisa		
2023	Scroll	Naho		
2023	Masked Hearts	Hanako	Lead role	
2023	Sylvanian Families the Movie: A Gift from Freya	Stella Chocolate (voice)		
2025	Dive in Wonderland	Queen of Hearts (voice)		
2026	Two Cigarettes, Three Nights	Kanna	Lead role	

=== Television ===
Year	Title	Role	Notes	Ref.
2011	Suzuki Sensei	Nanami Horinouchi		
2013	Amachan	Shiori Iruma	Asadora	
2014	GTO	Ayuna Shijo	Season 2	
2015	A Restaurant With Many Problems	Chika Ameki		
2015–17	Dr. Storks	Kae Shimoya	2 seasons	
2016	Sono 'Okodawari', Watashi ni mo Kure yo!!	Herself	Lead role	
2016	Sanada Maru	Chikurin-in	Taiga drama	
2016	Aquarium Girl	Yuka Shima	Lead role	
2017	My Loser Husband	Sayaka Kobayashi		
2018	Kuroido Goroshi	Hanako Kuroido	TV movie	
2018	Chihayafuru: Tsunagu	Shinobu Wakamiya		
2020	Love Begins When the Money Ends	Reiko Kuki	Lead role; miniseries	
2020	Dareka ga, Mite Iru	Deputy Director		
2022	Love with a Case	Tsumiki Sesuna		
2023	Fence	Kie Komatsu	Lead role; miniseries	
2023	The Greatest Teacher	Rina Kujo	Lead role	
2023	Yuria's Red String of Fate	Michiru Oyamada		
2023	The Makanai: Cooking for the Maiko House	Yoshino		
2024	Geeks: Weirdos on the Case	Yui Saizo	Lead role	
2025	Chihayafuru: Full Circle	Shinobu Wakamiya	Cameo	
2025	Queen of Mars	Dale-E0302	Miniseries	
2026	Plastic Beauty	Fumi Numata	Lead role	

=== Dubbing roles ===
Live-action

- Jurassic World – Gray Mitchell (Ty Simpkins)

Animation

- Cars 3 – Cruz Ramirez
- DC League of Super-Pets – PB

== Awards and nominations ==
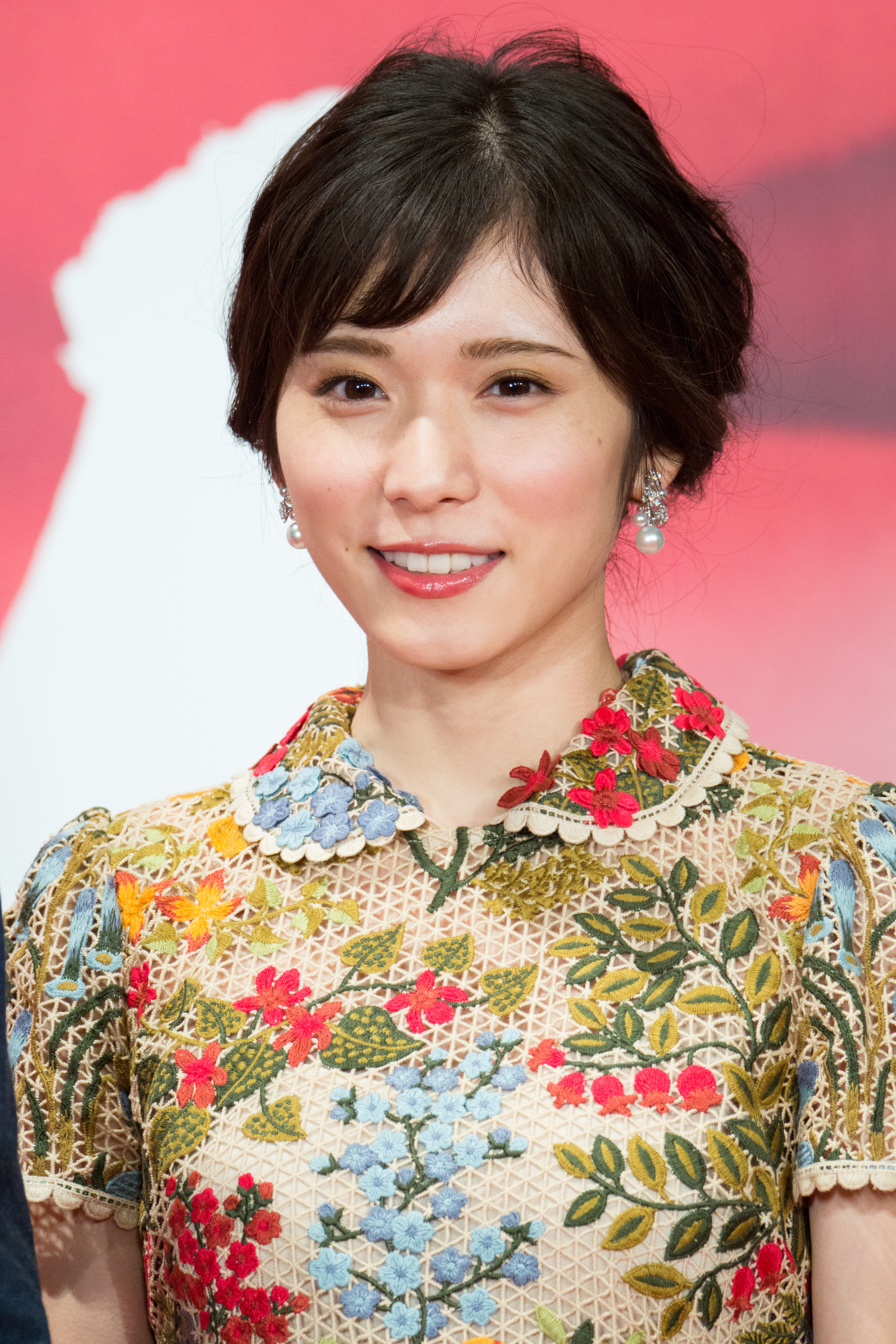
Matsuoka at the 2017 Tokyo International Film Festival

Year	Award	Category	Work(s)	Result	Ref.
2017	71st Mainichi Film Awards	Best New Actress	Chihayafuru	Nominated	
2018	27th Tokyo Sports Film Awards	Best Actress	Tremble All You Want	Nominated	
2018	27th Japanese Professional Movie Awards	Best Actress	Tremble All You Want	Won	
2018	Pen Creator Awards 2018	—N/a	Herself	Won	
2018	31st Nikkan Sports Film Awards	Best Actress	Tremble All You Want	Nominated	
2018	31st Nikkan Sports Film Awards	Best Supporting Actress	Shoplifters, Chihayafuru Part 3 and Blank13	Nominated	
2019	40th Yokohama Film Festival	Best Supporting Actress	Shoplifters, Chihayafuru Part 3 and Blank13	Won	
2019	73rd Mainichi Film Awards	Best Actress	Tremble All You Want	Nominated	
2019	73rd Mainichi Film Awards	Best Supporting Actress	Shoplifters	Nominated	
2019	61st Blue Ribbon Awards	Best Supporting Actress	Shoplifters and Chihayafuru Part 3	Won	
2019	28th Tokyo Sports Film Awards	Best Actress	Tremble All You Want	Nominated	
2019	28th Tokyo Sports Film Awards	Best Supporting Actress	Shoplifters	Won	
2019	13th Asian Film Awards	Best Supporting Actress	Shoplifters	Nominated	
2019	42nd Japan Academy Prize	Best Actress	Tremble All You Want	Nominated	
2019	42nd Japan Academy Prize	Best Supporting Actress	Shoplifters	Nominated	
2019	43rd Elan d'or Awards	Newcomer of the Year	Herself	Won	
2019	32nd Nikkan Sports Film Awards	Listen to the Universe	Best Actress	Won	
2020	74th Mainichi Film Awards	Best Actress	Listen to the Universe	Nominated	
2020	74th Mainichi Film Awards	Best Supporting Actress	One Night	Nominated	
2020	62nd Blue Ribbon Awards	Best Actress	Listen to the Universe	Nominated	
2020	62nd Blue Ribbon Awards	Best Supporting Actress	One Night	Nominated	
2020	43rd Japan Academy Film Prize	Best Actress	Listen to the Universe	Nominated	
2022	45th Japan Academy Film Prize	Best Actress	Kiba: The Fangs of Fiction	Nominated	
2023	36th Nikkan Sports Film Awards	Best Actress	Masked Hearts	Won	
2023	Elle Cinema Awards 2023	Best Actress	Masked Hearts	Won	
2024	66th Blue Ribbon Awards	Best Actress	Masked Hearts	Nominated	
2024	Osaka Cinema Festival 2024	Best Actress	Masked Hearts	Won	
