= Masami Imai =

American economist

- Born: July 8, 1972 (age 54)

Academic background
- Education: University of California, Davis; University of Wisconsin–Eau Claire

Academic work
- Institutions: Wesleyan University

Masami Imai (born July 8, 1972) is a Japanese economist. He currently works at Wesleyan University, where he serves as Director of the Fries Center for Global Studies. He holds a visiting position at the World Bank. Imai's research has appeared in several journals including the American Economic Journal, the Journal of Money, Credit, and Banking, the Journal of Law and Economics, Public Choice, the Journal of Banking and Finance, Explorations in Economic History, and the Asian Economic Journal. His research centers on Japan’s banking system and political economy, and the financial history of Japan. Imai received his undergraduate degree from the University of Wisconsin-Eau Claire and earned his doctorate from the University of California, Davis. He is affiliated with the American Economic Association, the American Finance Association, the Association for Comparative Economic Studies, the Financial Intermediation Research Society, and the Japan Economic Seminar.
