= Chihayafuru Part 3 =

2018 film directed by Norihiro Koizumi

Chihayafuru: Musubi
- Film poster

Japanese name
- Kanji: ちはやふる 結び
- Directed by: Norihiro Koizumi
- Screenplay by: Norihiro Koizumi
- Based on: Chihayafuru by Yuki Suetsugu
- Produced by: Kyōhei Sudate
- Starring: Suzu Hirose; Shūhei Nomura; Mackenyu Arata; Mone Kamishiraishi; Yūma Yamoto; Yūki Morinaga; Mayu Matsuoka; Kento Kaku; Miyuki Matsuda; Jun Kunimura
- Cinematography: Hiro'o Yanagida
- Edited by: Jun'nosuke Hogaki
- Music by: Masaru Yokoyama
- Production company: Robot Communications
- Distributed by: Toho
- Release date: March 17, 2018
- Running time: 128 minutes
- Country: Japan
- Language: Japanese
- Box office: ¥1.73 billion

Chihayafuru: Musubi (Japanese: ちはやふる 結び; lit. 'Chihayafuru: Conclusion') is a Japanese 2018 youth sports drama film written and directed by Norihiro Koizumi and starring Suzu Hirose, Shūhei Nomura and Mackenyu Arata. It is the third and final installment of the live action film adaptations of the manga series Chihayafuru, written and illustrated by Yuki Suetsugu, following Chihayafuru: Kami no Ku and Chihayafuru: Shimo no Ku. It was first announced at Sanuki Film Festival 2017.

== Plot ==
Taking place two years after the previous tournament, Chihaya and the Mizusawa Karuta Club are now in their final year of high school as they prepare for their last chance to compete at the national championship. As graduation approaches, the members must also begin thinking about their futures, which creates uncertainty about what will happen to the team after the tournament.

Meanwhile, Arata, who had distanced himself from competitive karuta, is inspired by Chihaya's dedication and forms his own karuta club at his high school with the goal of facing her at the national tournament. At the same time, Taichi, who has long struggled with pressure and expectations suddenly quits the Mizusawa club before the qualifiers, leaving the team shaken and Chihaya determined to bring him back. As the national tournament approaches, Chihaya continues to pursue her goal of becoming the Queen of karuta and facing the reigning champion, Shinobu Wakamiya.

== Cast ==
- Suzu Hirose as Chihaya Ayase
- Shūhei Nomura as Taichi Mashima
- Mackenyu Arata as Arata Wataya
- Mone Kamishiraishi as Kanade Ōe
- Yūma Yamoto as Yūsei Nishida
- Yūki Morinaga as Tsutomu Komano
- Hiroya Shimizu as Akihito Sudō
- Mio Yūki as Sumire Hanano
- Kaya Kiyohara as Iori Wagatsuma
- Ichika Osaki as Sae
- Hayato Sano as Akihiro Tsukuba
- Mayu Matsuoka as Shinobu Wakamiya
- Kento Kaku as Hisashi Suo
- Miyuki Matsuda as Taeko Miyauchi
- Jun Kunimura as Harada Hideo
