= Hammer Session! =

Japanese manga series

- First tankōbon volume cover

ハンマーセッション! (Hanmā Sesshon!)
- Manga
- Written by: Yamato Koganemaru (ch 1–31); Hiroyuki Yatsu (ch 31–96)
- Illustrated by: Namoshiro Tanahashi
- Published by: Kodansha
- Imprint: Shōnen Magazine Comics
- Magazine: Weekly Shōnen Magazine
- Original run: November 15, 2006 – December 10, 2008
- Volumes: 11
- Manga

Hammer Session! In High School
- Written by: Hiroyuki Yatsu
- Illustrated by: Namoshiro Tanahashi
- Published by: Kodansha
- Imprint: Shōnen Magazine Comics
- Magazine: Weekly Shōnen Magazine
- Original run: May 26, 2010 – November 2, 2010
- Volumes: 3
- Television drama
- Directed by: Manabu Aso; Yuji Nakamae
- Produced by: Tsuyoshi Sato; Yoshihiro Sato
- Written by: Maki Takahashi; Tatsuya Kanazawa
- Music by: Masaru Yokoyama; Audio Highs
- Original network: TBS
- Original run: July 10, 2010 – September 18, 2010
- Episodes: 11

Hammer Session (Japanese: ハンマーセッション!, Hepburn: Hanmā Sesshon!) is a Japanese manga series written by Yamato Koganemaru (first 31 chapters) and Hiroyuki Yatsu (onwards) and illustrated by Namoshiro Tanahashi. It was serialized in Kodansha's shōnen manga magazine Weekly Shōnen Magazine from November 2006 to December 2008, with its chapters collected in 11 tankōbon volumes. A second series, Hammer Session! In High School, was serialized in the same magazine from May to November 2010, with its chapters collected in three volumes. An 11-episode television drama adaptation was broadcast from July to September 2010.

== Media ==
=== Manga ===
Written by Yamato Koganemaru (until chapter 31) and Hiroyuki Yatsu (chapter 31–96), and illustrated by Namoshiro Tanahashi, and Hammer Session! was serialized in Kodansha's shōnen manga magazine Weekly Shōnen Magazine from November 15, 2006, to December 10, 2008. Kodansha collected its chapters in 11 tankōbon volumes, released from February 16, 2007, to January 16, 2009.

A second series, Hammer Session! In High School, was serialized in the same magazine from May 26 to November 2, 2010; a three-chapter extra story, titled Hammer Session! Akasagi-hen (ハンマーセッション! アカサギ編), was serialized in Magazine Special from June 19 to September 18 of the same year. Kodansha collected its chapters (including the Akasagi-hen chapters) in three tankōbon volumes, released from August 17 to December 17, 2010.

==== Volume list ====
Hammer Session!

No.	Japanese release date	Japanese ISBN
01	February 16, 2007	978-4-06-363798-4
02	April 17, 2007	978-4-06-363826-4
03	July 17, 2007	978-4-06-363845-5
04	September 14, 2007	978-4-06-363891-2
05	November 16, 2007	978-4-06-363916-2
06	February 15, 2008	978-4-06-363952-0
07	April 17, 2008	978-4-06-363975-9
08	June 17, 2008	978-4-06-384005-6
09	September 17, 2008	978-4-06-384042-1
10	November 17, 2008	978-4-06-384066-7
11	January 16, 2009	978-4-06-384087-2

Hammer Session! In High School

No.	Japanese release date	Japanese ISBN
1	August 17, 2010	978-4-06-384358-3
2	October 15, 2010	978-4-06-384375-0
3	December 17, 2010	978-4-06-384424-5

=== Drama ===
An 11-episode television drama adaptation was broadcast on TBS from July 10 to September 18, 2010. The series stars Mokomichi Hayami as Goro Hachisuka and Mirai Shida as Kaede Tachibana. The series' theme song is "Liar" by Spyair.
