= Chihayafuru =

Japanese manga series

- First tankōbon volume cover, featuring Chihaya Ayase

ちはやふる
- Genre: Romance; Slice of life; Sports (karuta)
- Manga
- Written by: Yuki Suetsugu
- Published by: Kodansha
- English publisher: NA: Kodansha USA (digital)
- Imprint: Kodansha Comics Be Love
- Magazine: Be Love
- Original run: 28 December 2007 – 1 August 2022
- Volumes: 50
- Anime television series
- Directed by: Morio Asaka
- Produced by: Toshio Nakatani; Manabu Tamura (S1); Naoki Iwasa (S1); Atsushi Kirimoto (S2); Yuka Ōyama (S2); Hiroyuki Inage (S3); Natsuko Tatsuzawa (S3); Hidetada Soga (S3); Kazushige Sengoku (S3); Ayuri Taguchi (S3); Takuya Shiroshita (S3)
- Written by: Naoya Takayama (S1); Yūko Kakihara (S2–3); Ayako Katō (S2)
- Music by: Kousuke Yamashita
- Studio: Madhouse
- Licensed by: AUS: Siren Visual; NA: Sentai Filmworks
- Original network: Nippon TV
- English network: SEA: Animax Asia
- Original run: 4 October 2011 – 24 March 2020
- Episodes: 74 + OVA
Further information
Novel series
Chihayafuru: Chūgakusei-hen
Written by	Yui Tokiumi
Illustrated by	Yuki Suetsugu
Published by	Kodansha
Imprint	KC Deluxe
Original run	9 September 2012 – 13 December 2013
Volumes	4
Novel series
Eiga Chihayafuru
Written by	Yui Tokumi; Norihiro Koizumi
Published by	Kodansha
Imprint	KC Deluxe
Original run	11 March 2016 – 13 February 2018
Volumes	3
Manga
Chihayafuru: Chūgakusei-hen
Written by	Yui Tokiumi
Illustrated by	Oto Tooda
Published by	Kodansha
Magazine	Be Love
Original run	13 October 2017 – 1 November 2018
Volumes	3
Novel series
Shōsetsu Chihayafuru
Written by	Yūki Arisawa
Published by	Kodansha
Imprint	Kodansha Bunko
Original run	16 January 2018 – 15 February 2018
Volumes	3
Manga
Chihayafuru plus Kimi ga Tame
Written by	Yuki Suetsugu
Published by	Kodansha
Magazine	Be Love
Original run	1 December 2023 – present
Volumes	7
Television drama
Chihayafuru: Meguri
Directed by	Naoya Fujita; Daisuke Honda; Chiaki Matsumoto; Kazuhiro Yoshida
Produced by	Norihiro Koizumi
Written by	Shiho Kosaka; Daisuke Honda; Chiaki Matsumoto; Suzuyuki Kaneko
Music by	Masaru Yokoyama
Original network	Nippon TV
Original run	July 9, 2025 – September 10, 2025
Episodes	10
- Live-action films
- Chihayafuru: Kami no Ku (2016); Chihayafuru: Shimo no Ku (2016); Chihayafuru: Musubi (2018)
- icon

Chihayafuru (ちはやふる) is a Japanese manga series written and illustrated by Yuki Suetsugu. It was serialized in Kodansha's josei manga magazine Be Love from December 2007 to August 2022, with its chapters collected in 50 tankōbon volumes. It is about a school girl, Chihaya Ayase, who is inspired by a new classmate to take up Hyakunin Isshu karuta competitively.

An anime television series adaptation aired from October 2011 to March 2012. The second season aired from January to June 2013 and the third from October 2019 to March 2020. Three live-action film adaptations were released from 2016 to 2018.

By February 2025, Chihayafuru had over 29 million copies in circulation, making it one of the best-selling manga series. The manga has won the second Manga Taishō and the 35th Kodansha Manga Award. Its popularity has boosted the profile of competitive karuta in Japan.

== Plot ==
Chihaya Ayase is a girl who has spent most of her life simply supporting her sister in her modeling career. That changes when she meets a boy named Arata Wataya, a talented karuta player. After becoming friends, he believes that Chihaya has potential to become a great player. As Chihaya takes on a new dream of becoming Japan's best karuta player, she is soon separated from her karuta playing friends as they grow up. Now in high school, Chihaya is reunited with her childhood friend, Taichi Mashima. Together, they form the Mizusawa Karuta Club. With her teammates and friends supporting her, Chihaya strives to become the best karuta player in the world and to one day be with Arata again.

== Development ==
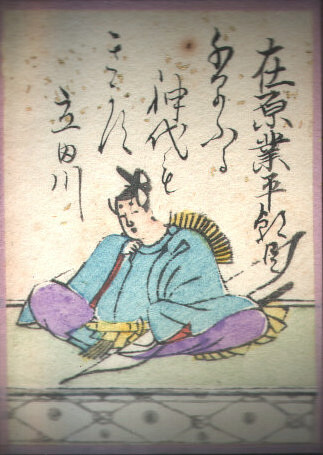
An Edo period karuta card with the Kami no Ku, or "upper phrase" from the Chihayaburu Tanka and the attribution to "Ariwara no Narihira Ason" written on it. The name of the series comes from this Heian era poem.

Yuki Suetsugu belonged to a karuta club in high school and feels that the school years are a period of a person's life where "you can dedicate the most genuine part of yourself to something." The name of the series is a poetic makurakotoba, or pillow word, and comes from the first five syllables of the seventeenth poem in the Hyakunin Isshu poetry anthology, a collection of 100 poems which are printed on the karuta cards. In this poem chihayaburu is used as an epithet to kami and can be translated into English as "shaken in fury" and "swift in fury", according to Edwin A. Cranston, or "awesome", as offered by Joshua S. Mostow.

== Media ==
=== Manga ===
Written and illustrated by Yuki Suetsugu, Chihayafuru was serialized in the josei manga magazine Be Love from 28 December 2007 to 1 August 2022, with a spinoff side-story chapter released on 1 November 2022. The series' 247 chapters and the side-story chapter were collected by publisher Kodansha into 50 tankōbon volumes, released between 13 May 2008 and 13 December 2022. (Note: In February 2019 the author stated that the manga was planned to be close to ending in late 2019. Although volume 49 was initially announced to be the final volume, it was later announced that volume 50 would be the final volume.) Kodansha has also published the first three volumes in a two-volume bilingual edition from 22 December 2011 to 24 February 2012, with English translations by Stuart Varnam Atkin and Yōko Toyozaki. On 14 February 2017 Kodansha Comics began publishing a digital edition of the series in English, with the last volume released on 3 June 2025.

A manga adapting the midquel novels Chihayafuru: Chūgakusei-hen, written by Yui Tokiumi and illustrated by Oto Tooda, was published in the same magazine from 13 October 2017 to 1 November 2018 and compiled into three volumes, released between 13 February and 13 November 2018.

A sequel manga series, titled Chihayafuru plus Kimi ga Tame (ちはやふる plus きみがため; lit. 'Chihayafuru Plus: For You'), began serialization on 1 December 2023.

=== Anime ===
A 25-episode anime television series adaptation, produced by the studio Madhouse under the direction of Morio Asaka, aired on Nippon TV from 4 October 2011 to 27 March 2012. (Note: As Chihayafuru's first season aired in Nippon TV's Tuesday 25:59 (1:59 JST) time slot, the episodes technically aired the days following the ones listed.) The screenplay was written by Naoya Takayama and character designs were by Kunihiko Hamada. The music was composed by Kousuke Yamashita, and the sound director was Masafumi Mima of Techno Sound. The series was simulcast by Crunchyroll. Animax Asia aired an English version of the anime from 13 February to 18 March 2013. The series was released in nine DVD and Blu-ray Disc volumes from 21 December 2011 to 22 August 2012. A Blu-ray Disc box set was released on 18 July 2013.

A second 25-episode season aired on Nippon Television between 11 January and 28 June 2013, (Note: As Chihayafuru's second season aired in Nippon Television's Friday 25:53 (1:53 JST) time slot, the episodes technically aired the days following the ones listed.) and was simulcast by Crunchyroll. An original video animation episode was released on DVD bundled with the special edition of the 22nd manga volume on 13 September 2013. The season was collected in a two-volume Blu-ray and DVD box set released on 22 May 2013 and 18 September 2013.

A 24-episode (Note: Without counting the recap episode, which were included in the episode count in previous seasons.) third season was originally announced to premiere on Nippon Television's AnichU block in April 2019, with the main cast and staff reprising their roles, but was delayed and aired from 22 October 2019 to 24 March 2020. It was also simulcast by Crunchyroll. The season was collected in a two-volume Blu-ray and DVD box set released on 25 December 2019 and 25 March 2020.

The first season's opening and ending themes are "Youthful" by 99RadioService and "Soshite Ima" (そしていま; "And Now") by Asami Seto respectively. 99RadioService released "Youthful" as a single on 30 November 2011. The original soundtrack with character song albums was released in two volumes on 18 January and 28 March 2012. The second season's opening and ending themes are "Star" by 99RadioService and "Akane Sora" (茜空) by Seto. The third season's opening and ending themes are "Colorful" by 99RadioService and "Hitomebore" (一目惚れ; "Love at First Sight") by Band Harassment.

In September 2016, Sentai Filmworks, announced that they had licensed the first two seasons of the anime series for home video and digital release in North America. The series' first season premiered with English subtitles on the Hidive streaming service on 15 June 2017, with the second premiering on 19 March 2018. Sentai Filmworks' dub is streamed by Hidive starting from 29 August 2017. The first season was released on DVD and Blu-ray on 12 September 2017 and the second on 20 March 2018. In December 2019, Sentai Filmworks announced that they had licensed the series' third season. It was released on DVD and Blu-ray on 27 July 2021, while its English dub was added to Hidive on 30 July.

=== Novels ===
A four-volume novel series, Chihayafuru: Chūgakusei-hen (ちはやふる 中学生編; lit. 'Chihayafuru: Middle School Arc'), was published by Kodansha under their KC Deluxe imprint between 9 September 2012, and 13 December 2013. The books were written by Yui Tokiumi and illustrated by Yuki Suetsugu and follow the middle-school years of the three protagonists.

A three-volume novelization of the films, Eiga Chihayafuru (小説 映画 ちはやふる; lit. 'Movie Chihayafuru'), was published by Kodansha under their KC Deluxe imprint. The first two volumes were released on 11 March 2016 and the third on 13 February 2018. The books were written by Tokiumi, based on the screenplay by Norihiro Koizumi. They were re-released in hardcover from 24 February 2017 to 28 February 2018. Another three-volume novelization of the films by Yūki Arisawa, Shōsetsu Chihayafuru (小説 ちはやふる; lit. 'Novel Chihayafuru'), was published by Kodansha under their Kodansha Bunko imprint in 2018. The first two volumes were released on 16 January and the third on 15 February.

=== Live-action ===
On 11 April 2015, it was reported that the series would be adapted into a live-action film. A film adaptation titled Chihayafuru: Kami no Ku was released on 19 March 2016, with a second film, Chihayafuru: Shimo no Ku, released on 29 April 2016. Chihayafuru: Musubi, a third and final feature-length film in the trilogy, was released on 17 March 2018. The films got a five-episode tie-in series on Hulu Japan on 20 February 2018. The series is titled Chihayafuru: Tsunagu (ちはやふる －繋ぐ－; lit. 'Chihayafuru: Connect'), and connected the story of the second and third films. It also included behind-the-scenes footage and cast interviews. In addition, the third film got another tie-in titled Chihayafuru: Manabi (ちはやふる－学び－; lit. 'Chihayafuru: Study') on Hulu Japan on the same day that introduced the new members of the Mizusawa Karuta Club and explained the rules of karuta. A television series sequel, Chihayafuru: Full Circle (ちはやふる－めぐり－, Chihayafuru: Meguri), set ten years after the third film, premiered on Nippon TV in July 2025.

=== Other media ===
Kodansha released several guidebooks for the series, with the first released on 9 November 2011. It provided a study guide for the poetry and background for the story.

== Reception ==
The manga had over 16 million copies in circulation in Japan by 2016; over 24 million by the end of 2019; over 27 million by the beginning of 2022; over 28 million by the end of 2022; and over 29 million copies in circulation by February 2025.

Chihayafuru won the second Manga Taishō award, and the 35th Kodansha Manga Award in the shōjo category. When Chihayafuru won the Manga Taishō award, it was commented that the series combines elements of the sport genre and literary elements with a discerning eye on the subject matter. It was one of the Jury Recommended Works in the Manga category at the 16th Japan Media Arts Festival in 2012.

Its popularity has boosted the popularity of competitive karuta. The manga has regularly appeared on Oricon's Japanese Comic Ranking chart. Between March 2009 and September 2011, the fourth through fourteenth volumes all appeared in the top 25 during the week of their release and the week after.

Among North American reviewers, Gia Manry, writing about the first episode of Chihayafuru, mentioned that despite the animators' efforts, there was an overuse of CG sakura, describing it as a "mixed bag". Bamboo Dong says that Chihaya's passion and characterisation make karuta interesting. Carlo Santos felt that the series was the "first genuinely good show of the season", citing its characterisation, unusual subject, and polish of the first episode. Marcus Speer enjoyed the production values of the first episode, but felt that the theme songs were "standard fare". He was intrigued by how the characters' childhood impacted on their present interactions. Theron Martin appreciated the focus on the characters rather than the game, feeling that while the high school-aged Chihaya seemed "gimmicky", her younger self was "quite likable". Chris Beveridge praised the tension shown between Arata and Taichi in the second episode's karuta match. Theron Martin felt the second episode's karuta tournament was tense and compelling, and the plot unfolding in a good way, the execution made this good. Crunchyroll listed it in their "Top 100 best anime of the 2010s". IGN also listed Chihayafuru among the best anime series of the 2010s.
