= Her Blue Sky =

2019 Japanese anime film directed by Tatsuyuki Nagai

- Promotional poster

Japanese name
- Kanji: 空の青さを知る人よ
- Literal meaning: To Those Who Know of the Blueness of the Sky
Transcriptions
- Revised Hepburn: Sora no Aosa o Shiru Hito yo
- Directed by: Tatsuyuki Nagai
- Screenplay by: Mari Okada
- Created by: Super Peace Busters
- Produced by: Hiroyuki Shimizu; Genki Kawamura
- Starring: Ryo Yoshizawa; Riho Yoshioka; Shion Wakayama; Yō Taichi; Fukushi Ochiai; Atsumi Tanezaki; Ken Matsudaira
- Cinematography: Hiroyuki Moriyama
- Edited by: Shigeru Nishiyama
- Music by: Masaru Yokoyama
- Production company: CloverWorks
- Distributed by: Toho
- Release date: October 11, 2019
- Running time: 108 minutes
- Country: Japan
- Language: Japanese
- Box office: ¥440.5 million

Her Blue Sky (Japanese: 空の青さを知る人よ, Hepburn: Sora no Aosa o Shiru Hito yo; lit. 'To Those Who Know of the Blueness of the Sky') is a 2019 Japanese animated film produced by CloverWorks. The film is directed by Tatsuyuki Nagai and written by Mari Okada, with Masayoshi Tanaka designing the characters and serving as chief animation director. The trio under the creative team Super Peace Busters previously worked together on Toradora!, Anohana: The Flower We Saw That Day, and The Anthem of the Heart. It was released in Japan on October 11, 2019, in all Toho Cinemas.

== Synopsis ==
In Chichibu, 18-year-old Shinnosuke Kanamuro (nicknamed Shinno), who is an aspiring guitarist is dating Akane Aioi. Shinno is also friendly with Akane's 3-year-old sister Aoi, and in turn the sisters support Shinno's band. Akane plans to move to Tokyo with Shinno after graduation, where he'll pursue a career in music. However, the girls' parents are killed in a car accident and Akane changes her plans, choosing to stay in Chichibu to raise Aoi.

Thirteen years later, Aoi is an aspiring bassist who plans to move to Tokyo after high school, while Akane works for the city hall. Masamichi Nakamura (nicknamed Michinko), the drummer of Shinno's former band, also works for the city hall. Michinko is planning to hold a music festival to boost the city's tourism, and the main performer is the famous enka singer Dankichi Nitobe.

One afternoon, while practicing bass alone in the hall, (Note: The same place where Shinno's band practiced 13 years ago.) Aoi encounters Shinno from thirteen years ago. Frightened, she runs home to Akane and awkwardly asks her about Shinno. Akane admits that she has not heard from Shinno since he left, and is not even sure if he is still alive. This leads Aoi to believe she had seen Shinno's ghost. Later, the sisters reluctantly help Michinko in welcoming Dankichi Nitobe, and they are surprised to see a grown Shinnosuke (Note: In the film, the real 30-year-old Shinnosuke Kanamuro is referred to as "Shinnosuke", while the 17-year-old ikiryō (living ghost) is referred to as "Shinno".) as the guitarist of Nitobe's backup band. Aoi then returns to the hall with her friend Tsugu (Michinko's son), where they confirm that the young Shinno has a physical body but is unable to leave the hall. Tsugu hypothesizes that Shinno is an ikiryō (living ghost) born from Shinnosuke's strong unresolved feelings. Shinno then asks Aoi to help bring Akane and Shinnosuke together, believing that doing so will return him to Shinnosuke's body. However, this proves to be difficult as Shinnosuke is rude, arrogant, and does not get along with the Aioi sisters—a different person from the Shinno that they once knew.

== Characters ==
Aoi Aioi (相生 あおい, Aioi Aoi)
Voiced by: Shion Wakayama (Japanese); Miya Kodama (English)
A second-year high school (Note: Equivalent to 11th grade. See Education in Japan.) student who is an aspiring musician who was influenced by Shinno. She grows up thinking that her older sister Akane did not go to Tokyo with Shinno because of her.
Shinnosuke Kanamuro (金室 慎之介, Kanamuro Shinnosuke) / Shinno (しんの)
Voiced by: Ryo Yoshizawa (Japanese); Edward Hong (Shinnousuke Kanamuro), Anthony Ma (Shinno) (English)
He is a 31-year-old struggling guitarist. An ikiryō (living ghost) of his 18-year-old self appears.
Akane Aioi (相生 あかね, Aioi Akane)
Voiced by: Riho Yoshioka (Japanese); Anne Yatco (English)
Aoi's 31-year-old reserved older sister and Shinnosuke's ex-girlfriend. She has been supporting her Aoi ever since the death of their parents. She is called Akanē (あか姉) by her.
Dankichi Nitobe (新渡戸 団吉, Nitobe Dankichi)
Voiced by: Ken Matsudaira (Japanese); Ronald M. Banks (English)
A famous enka singer.
Masatsugu Nakamura (中村 正嗣, Nakamura Masatsugu)
Voiced by: Yō Taichi (Japanese); Maya Aoki Tuttle (English)
Masamichi's son who is in fifth grade. He has a crush on Aoi.
Masamichi Nakamura (中村 正道, Nakamura Masamichi)
Voiced by: Fukushi Ochiai (Japanese); Brent Mukai (English)
A former drummer in Shinnosuke's band, and high school classmate of Akane and Shinnosuke. He divorced his cheating wife and has a crush on Akane.
Chika Ōtaki (大滝 千佳, Ōtaki Chika)
Voiced by: Atsumi Tanezaki (Japanese); Geri Courtney-Austein (English)
A classmate of Aoi. She dreams of getting a boyfriend who is in a band.

== Production ==
Her Blue Sky was announced by the Super Peace Busters creative team on March 21, 2019, consisting of director Tatsuyuki Nagai, screenwriter Mari Okada, and character designer Masayoshi Tanaka. The trio previously collaborated on Toradora!, Anohana: The Flower We Saw That Day, and The Anthem of the Heart, with the film set in Chichibu, Saitama, Okada's hometown and the setting of the two latter aforementioned anime, focusing on the relationship between four individuals. The film is animated by CloverWorks, directed by Nagai and written by Okada, with Tanaka serving as character designer and chief animation director. Masaru Yokoyama is composing the film's soundtrack. Aniplex, Fuji TV, Toho, and Story Inc. are credited for production.

The theme song titled after the film, "Her Blue Sky" (空の青さを知る人よ, Sora no Aosa o Shiru Hito yo), as well as the ending theme song "Mellow Blue" (葵, Aoi) are performed by Aimyon.

== Release ==
The film was distributed by Toho and it was released in Japan on October 11, 2019, in all Toho Cinemas in Japan. Netflix began streaming the film in October 2024, with an English dub. along with a Spanish and Portuguese HBO Max streamed the film in Southeast Asia on November 19, 2024, and removed on September 1, 2025.

Anime Limited licensed the film for the UK and Ireland, releasing it on 4K UHD, Blu-ray and DVD on October 12, 2026.

== Reception ==
=== Box office ===
Her Blue Sky in its opening weekend ranked #4 in the Japanese box office, earning ¥68.5 million in 3 days. As of October 28, 2019, the film has grossed a total of ¥440.5 million (approximately US$4.04 million).

The film was released on DVD and Blu-ray in Japan on June 10, 2020.

== Other media ==
Two novels and three manga volumes were released.

=== Novels ===
One of the novels was released in two different forms:

- Her Blue Sky: A Novel (小説 空の青さを知る人よ, Shōsetsu: Sora no Aosa o Shiru Hito yo) by Mio Nukaga (August 2019, Kadokawa, ISBN 978-4-04-108655-1, based on the screenplay)
- Her Blue Sky (空の青さを知る人よ, Sora no Aosa o Shiru Hito yo) by Mio Nukaga (August 2019, Kadokawa, ISBN 978-4-04-631949-4, same novel as above, but with furigana and illustrated by Ryō Akizuki)

The second novel was a spinoff told from the perspectives of other characters in the story:

- Her Blue Sky: Alternative Melodies (空の青さを知る人よ Alternative Melodies, Sora no Aosa o Shiru Hito yo: Arutanatibu Merodīzu) by Saginomiya Misaki (October 2019, Kadokawa, ISBN 978-4-04-912801-7)

=== Manga ===
A three-volume manga series by Yaeko Ninagawa was released between 2019 and 2020 by Kadokawa Corporation after being serialized on their Comic Newtype website.

- Volume 1 (October 2019, ISBN 978-4-04-108848-7)
- Volume 2 (April 2020, ISBN 978-4-04-109438-9)
- Volume 3 (September 2020, ISBN 978-4-04-110178-0)
