= Tatsuyuki Nagai =

Japanese anime director (born 1976)

- 長井 龍雪
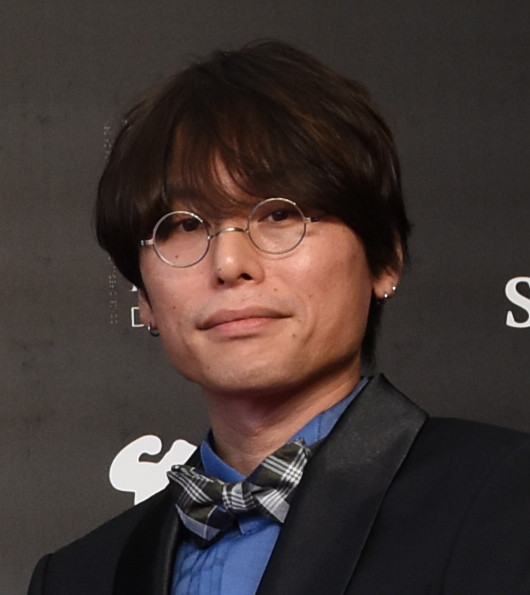
- Nagai in 2019
- Born: 24 January 1976 (age 50); Niitsu, Niigata, Japan
- Occupations: storyboard artist; director
- Years active: 1989–present

Japanese name
- Kanji: 長井 龍雪
- Kana: タツァイアッキー・ナーガーイー
Transcriptions
- Romanization: Nagai Tatsuyuki

Tatsuyuki Nagai (長井 龍雪, Nagai Tatsuyuki; born 24 January 1976) is a Japanese director and anime storyboard artist. He is known for being one third of the creative team Super Peace Busters. He made his directorial debut for the second season of Honey and Clover. He then worked on the anime series, Idolmaster: Xenoglossia. He directed Toradora!, an adaptation of the light novel series of the same name. He has also directed all three seasons of the anime adaptation of the manga series A Certain Scientific Railgun.

Nagai received praise for his direction in the original anime series, Anohana (2011), his next directed original anime Waiting in the Summer was released the next year. In 2015, he directed the feature film The Anthem of the Heart which received a nomination for Animation of the Year at the 39th Japanese Academy Awards. In that same year, he directed the mecha anime series Mobile Suit Gundam: Iron-Blooded Orphans, the series was the fourteenth mainline entry in Sunrise's long-running franchise Gundam. He has since directed the feature films Her Blue Sky (2019) and Fureru (2024), both of which are produced by CloverWorks.

== Career ==
After graduating from Niigata College of Art & Design, Nagai worked as a freelance storyboard artist and director in the anime industry in 2000. He made his directorial debut with the second season of Honey and Clover in 2006. During this time, he met screenwriter Mari Okada and character designer Masayoshi Tanaka, with whom he formed an artist collective called Super Peace Busters. The following year, he worked on the sci-fi anime series Idolmaster: Xenoglossia.

In 2008, Nagai worked as part of the Super Peace Busters and directed Toradora!, an anime adaptation of Yuyuko Takemiya's light novel series of the same name. Following the success of Toradora!, the team worked again in 2011 to create anime series, Anohana. The series received widespread acclaim from audiences and critics and has been considered one of the best anime of the 2010s. Nagai directed Waiting in the Summer, an original anime series in 2012.

In 2015, Nagai directed the feature film The Anthem of the Heart. It was critically acclaimed, receiving many awards and nominations including an award for Best Animated Feature at the 36th Anima Festival, a nomination for Best Animated Feature at the 49th Sitges Film Festival and nominations for Animation of the Year at the 39th Japan Academy Film Prize and Tokyo Anime Award Festival 2016. That same year, Nagai worked on the original anime television series Mobile Suit Gundam: Iron-Blooded Orphans.

His next directed feature film, Her Blue Sky, an original anime film was released on October 11, 2019.

In 2023, Nagai directed the original anime film, Fureru. It premiered on October 4, 2024.

== Filmography ==
=== Films ===
Title	Year	Credited as				Notes
Title	Year	Director	Producer	Actor	Other	Notes
Anohana: The Flower We Saw That Day - The Movie (めんまへの手紙 Menma e no Tegami)	2013	Yes				Film adaptation of Anohana: The Flower We Saw That Day
The Anthem of the Heart (心が叫びたがってるんだ。Kokoro ga Sakebitagatterunda)	2015	Yes				
Her Blue Sky (空の青さを知る人よ Sora no Aosa o Shiru Hito yo)	2019	Yes				
Fureru (ふれる。Sawaru)	2024	Yes				

=== Television ===
Title	Year	Credited as			
Title	Year	Director	Producer	Actor	Other
Super Mario's Fire Brigade	1989				Unit director
Cosplay Complex	2002				Unit director
G-on Riders	2002				storyboards; unit director
Mahoromatic: Motto Utsukushii Mono	2002				Unit director
Witch Hunter Robin	2002				Unit director
L/R -Licensed by Royal-	2003				Unit director
Jubei ninpucho: Ryuhogyoku-hen	2003				Unit director
Ikki Tousen	2003				storyboards
Maburaho	2003				assistant director
Mai-HiME	2004				unit director; storyboards
Mahoraba ~Heartful Days~	2005				storyboards
Honey and Clover	2005				unit director
Mai-Otome	2005				unit director; storyboards
Mushishi	2005				unit director; storyboards
Yomigaeru Sora - Rescue Wings	2006				storyboards
Honey and Clover II	2006	Yes			
Mobile Suit Gundam 00	2007				ED storyboards; episode direction
Potemayo	2007				episode direction
Idolmaster: Xenoglossia	2007	Yes			
KimiKiss: Pure Rouge	2008				2nd OP storyboards; episode direction
Shigofumi: Letters from the Departed	2008				episode direction
Toradora!	2008–2009	Yes			
A Certain Scientific Railgun	2009–2010	Yes			
Anohana: The Flower We Saw That Day	2011	Yes			
Kaitō Tenshi Twin Angel	2011	Yes			
Waiting in the Summer	2012	Yes			
A Certain Scientific Railgun S	2013	Yes			
Mobile Suit Gundam: Iron-Blooded Orphans	2015–2017	Yes			
A Certain Scientific Railgun T	2020	Yes			
A Certain Dark Item	2026	Yes			

== Accolades ==
Year	Award	Category	Work	Result	Ref.
2016	39th Japan Academy Film Prize	Animation of the Year	The Anthem of the Heart	Nominated	
2016	36th Anima Festival Awards	BeTV Award for Best Animated Feature	The Anthem of the Heart	Won	
2016	49th Sitges Film Festival	Anima't Award for Best Animated Feature Film	The Anthem of the Heart	Nominated	
2016	Tokyo Anime Award Festival 2016	Animation of the Year	The Anthem of the Heart	Nominated	
