= Mobile Suit Gundam: Iron-Blooded Orphans =

Japanese anime television series

- 機動戦士ガンダム 鉄血のオルフェンズ
- Type: TV series
- Genre: Mecha, military science fiction
- Created by: Hajime Yatate; Yoshiyuki Tomino
- Directed by: Tatsuyuki Nagai
- Series composition: Mari Okada
- Character designers: Yu Ito (original); Michinori Chiba
- Mechanical designers: Naohiro Washio; Kanetake Ebikawa; Ippei Gyobu; Tsutomu Shinohara; Kenji Teraoka
- Music by: Masaru Yokoyama
- Country of origin: Japan
- Original language: Japanese
- No. of seasons: 2
- No. of episodes: 50
- Episodes

Production
- Producers: Masakazu Ogawa; Toshihiro Maeda
- Executive producers: Shin Sasaki; Hirô Maruyama
- Production companies: Sunrise; MBS

Original release
- Networks: JNN (MBS, TBS)
- Release: October 4, 2015 – April 2, 2017

Related
Further information
Manga
Written by	Kazuma Isobe
Published by	Kadokawa Shoten
Magazine	Gundam Ace
Original run	October 26, 2015 – October 26, 2018
Volumes	7
Manga
Mobile Suit Gundam: Iron-Blooded Orphans Steel Moon
Written by	Hajime Kamoshida
Published by	Kadokawa Shoten
Magazine	Gundam Ace
Original run	June 2016 – March 2018
Volumes	4
Video game
Mobile Suit Gundam: Iron-Blooded Orphans – Urðr Hunt
Publisher	Bandai Namco Entertainment
Directed by	Tatsuyuki Nagai
Music by	Masaru Yokoyama
Genre	Role-playing game, visual novel
Platform	iOS; Android
Released	November 15, 2022
Anime film
Mobile Suit Gundam: Iron-Blooded Orphans – Urðr Hunt Special Edition: Path of the Little Challenger
Directed by	Tatsuyuki Nagai
Produced by	Masakazu Ogawa; Yasunori Fujiwara
Written by	Michihiro Tsuchiya
Music by	Masaru Yokoyama
Studio	Sunrise
Released	October 31, 2025
Anime
Mobile Suit Gundam: Iron-Blooded Orphans – Interlude Wedge
Directed by	Tatsuyuki Nagai
Produced by	Masakazu Ogawa; Yasunori Fujiwara
Written by	Mari Okada
Music by	Masaru Yokoyama
Studio	Sunrise
Released	October 31, 2025

Mobile Suit Gundam: Iron-Blooded Orphans (Japanese: 機動戦士ガンダム 鉄血のオルフェンズ, Hepburn: Kidō Senshi Gandamu: Tekketsu no Orufenzu), also known as Gundam IBO and G-Tekketsu (Gの鉄血), is a 2015 Japanese television mecha anime series and the fourteenth mainline entry in Sunrise's long-running Gundam franchise, succeeding Gundam Reconguista in G. The series is directed by Tatsuyuki Nagai and written by Mari Okada, a team which previously collaborated on Toradora! and Anohana: The Flower We Saw That Day. It aired in Japan on MBS and other JNN stations from October 4, 2015, to March 27, 2016, making this the first Gundam series to return to a Sunday late afternoon time slot since Mobile Suit Gundam Seed. A second season premiered the following year on October 2, 2016.

Iron-Blooded Orphans follows the exploits of a group of juvenile soldiers who establish their own security company after rebelling against the adults who betrayed them on a futuristic, terraformed Mars. The series deals with several real-life problems such as war, slavery, child soldiers, poverty, neo-colonialism, and corruption. The catchphrase of the series is "The sustenance of life is on the battlefield." (いのちの糧は、戦場にある。, Inochi no kate wa, senjō ni aru.)

== Story ==
It is the year 323 P.D. (Post Disaster), more than 300 years after a disastrous, interplanetary conflict known as the "Calamity War". Mars has been successfully terraformed and colonized by humans. However, even with the technological advancements, the humans on Mars crave freedom against the government of Earth and seek to improve their livelihoods. Furthermore, while most of Mars' nations have received autonomy, the planet is virtually dependent on Earth for economic development with many living in impoverished conditions.

Kudelia Aina Bernstein, a Martian noblewoman, employs the civilian security company Chryse Guard Security (CGS) to transport her to Earth to negotiate the independence of her nation, Chryse, from Earth. But the Earth Military organization Gjallarhorn, attacks CGS in an attempt to halt the Martian independence movement. During the attack, Orga Itsuka, the leader of the Third Army Division within CGS, which is composed of children, decides to rebel against the adult higher-ups who had escaped and left the child and teen foot-soldiers to fight and die as disposable decoys. As all hope seems lost, a young orphan under Orga's command named Mikazuki Augus enters the battle, piloting a hastily repaired mobile suit: the legendary Gundam Barbatos. After repelling Gjallarhorn's attack, Orga and the rest of the Third Army Division dispose of the adult higher-ups who betrayed them and take control of CGS, refounding it as the mercenary company "Tekkadan" (Japanese for "Iron Flower").

In Tekkadan's first job, they accept to escort Kudelia to Earth for her to take part in the negotiations with the government of Arbrau, the superpower that rules over Chryse. However, Gjallarhorn's continuous attempts to stop their progress leads Tekkadan to join forces with Teiwaz, a business conglomerate that operates around Jupiter. Under Teiwaz's protection and being secretly assisted by McGillis Fareed, one of the top echelons of Gjallarhorn with his own agenda, Tekkadan successfully takes Kudelia to Earth, and safely escorts her to Arbrau's capital where she successfully negotiates more economic freedom for Mars, while McGillis takes advantage of their success to overthrow his own adoptive father and bolster his position within Gjallarhorn.

Some years later, Tekkadan establishes itself as a prominent military company, while Kudelia establishes a mining company in Chryse, working to improve the inhabitants' conditions and McGillis moves forward with his agenda to reform Gjallarhorn. However, one of Gjallarhorn's factions opposing him, the Arianrhod Fleet, led by Rustal Elion, starts working in the shadows to sabotage both McGillis and Tekkadan. McGillis convinces Tekkadan to help him destroy Arianrhod under the promise that once he manages to take full control of Gjallarhorn, he will transfer all authority over Mars to Tekkadan, making them the de facto rulers of the planet. However, they are defeated and forced to flee to Mars, where McGillis is killed after a last, failed attempt to kill Rustal and Tekkadan is disbanded after Arianrhod launches an attack to exterminate all members and make an example out of them, but only a few, including Mikazuki, sacrifice themselves to hold out the enemy long enough for the rest to escape safely.

In the aftermath several years later, Gjallarhorn repeals its council system and reforms into a more democratic organization, with Rustal as its head. Kudelia becomes the chairwoman of the now independent Mars Union and the surviving Tekkadan members follow their separate ways while remaining in touch, each looking to honor their friends who died to give them a new, brighter future.

== Development ==
The series was first teased by Sunrise through a new teaser site for the series, with a countdown to reveal the new main Mobile Suit on July 15, 2015. As it was only referred to as G-Tekketsu, the details for the new lead Gundam was shown day by day until the full reveal at Sunrise and Bandai's press conference. Following the official unveiling of the series, Sunrise plans for a new wave of merchandise for the series, including Gunpla kits and video game tie-ins. A second Promotional video was then revealed, confirming the voice actors for the series's main cast. The series ran for 25 episodes. During the end credits of episode 25, a second season was confirmed.

=== Production ===
For episodes 24 and 25, the battle in Edmonton in the fictional state of Arbrau features backgrounds based on actual locations of the city in Alberta, Canada.

== Media ==
=== Anime ===
Mobile Suit Gundam: Iron-Blooded Orphans premiered in Japan on MBS and TBS on October 4, 2015, Sunday at 5:00 pm, replacing The Heroic Legend of Arslan on its initial timeslot. It is the first Gundam series to return on the late afternoon schedule since Mobile Suit Gundam AGE. Sunrise announced that the series will be streamed worldwide on YouTube via the Gundam.Info Channel, Funimation, Hulu, Crunchyroll, and Daisuki. On October 9, 2015, Sunrise announced at their panel at New York Comic Con that the anime will get an English dub to be produced by Bang Zoom! Entertainment. Turner Broadcasting began broadcasting the series on Adult Swim's Toonami programming block on June 5, 2016, with season 2 premiering on October 8, 2017.

Following the conclusion to the anime's 25th episode, it was announced that a second season would premiere in the fall of 2016. The anime concluded on April 2, 2017, with the second season's 25th episode, bringing the overall episode count in the series to 50.

Bandai Visual released the first volume of the series in both Blu-ray and DVD on December 24, 2015, containing a serial code for Mobile Suit Gundam Extreme Vs. Force to obtain the Gundam Barbatos. In the 2017 Anime Expo, Funimation announced that the series will be released on home video in partnership with Sunrise for North American Territories, marking as the first Gundam series to be co-licensed by a company other than Right Stuf Inc. and Nozomi Entertainment. Both seasons of the series were later added to Netflix for paid streaming on November 5, 2019.

=== Manga ===
A manga adaptation by Kazuma Isobe began its serialization in the December Issue of Gundam Ace on October 26, 2015. A side story manga titled Mobile Suit Gundam: Iron-Blooded Orphans Steel Moon (Japanese: 機動戦士ガンダム 鉄血のオルフェンズ 月鋼, Hepburn: Kidō Senshi Gandamu Tekketsu no Orufenzu Gekkō) was published in Gundam Ace from April 26, 2016, to March 26, 2018, and collected into four volumes.

=== Music ===
The soundtrack is composed by Masaru Yokoyama (Nobunaga The Fool, Freezing). The first season's opening theme song is titled "Raise your flag", performed by Man with a Mission, while the ending theme is "Orphans no Namida" performed by Misia and co-written by Shiro Sagisu. From episode 14 onwards the opening theme is "Survivor" by Blue Encount, while the ending theme is titled "STEEL -Tekketsu no Kizuna-" (STEEL-鉄血の絆-, STEEL -tekketsu no kizuna-; "STEEL -Iron Blooded Bonds-") by TRUE. The ending theme for episode 19 is "Senka no Tomoshibi" (戦火の灯火; "Lamplight of War") by Yūko Suzuhana., and "Orphans no Namida" is used again for the ending of episode 21.

First used as the end track of episode 26, "RAGE OF DUST" by Spyair is the opening theme beginning with episode 27, while the ending theme for episodes 27 and following is "Shōnen no Hate" (少年の果て; "Childhood's End") by Granrodeo. From episode 39 onward, the opening theme is "Fighter" by Kana-Boon while the ending is "Freesia" (フリージア, Furīja) performed by Uru.

=== Video games ===
The series's main mobile suit (1st form) first appeared on the PlayStation Vita game Mobile Suit Gundam Extreme Vs. Force through the first Blu-ray volume serial code. The mobile suit (4th form) also appeared in the PlayStation 4 and PlayStation Vita game Gundam Breaker 3 and the arcade Game Mobile Suit Gundam Extreme Vs. Maxi Boost ON. Later, Gundam Barbatos 6th form, Gundam Barbatos Lupus, Gundam Gusion and Gusion Rebake, Gundam Kimaris and Gundam Astaroth was released as DLC units for Gundam Breaker 3. Gundam Kimaris Trooper is added in Mobile Suit Gundam Extreme Vs. Maxi Boost ON's expansion pack and later supplant by the Second Season's main mobile suit, Gundam Barbatos Lupus and later, Gundam Gusion Rebake Full City and Gundam Bael. In Mobile Suit Gundam Extreme Vs. 2, Gundam Barbatos Lupus Rex is a playable unit. The Graze Ein serves as a boss unit. Gundam Kimaris Vidar was later added as a playable unit. In Mobile Suit Gundam Extreme Vs. 2 XBoost, Gundam Flauros (Ryusei-Go) was later added as a playable unit.

An official spinoff game, titled Mobile Suit Gundam: Iron-Blooded Orphans Urðr Hunt (Japanese: 機動戦士ガンダム 鉄血のオルフェンズ：ウルズハント, Hepburn: Kidō Senshi Gandamu Tekketsu no Orufenzu: Uruzuhanto) was announced on January 7, 2019, for iOS and Android, as part of Gundam's 40th Anniversary celebration, with animated scenes done by Sunrise Beyond. It is directed by Tatsuyuki Nagai and written by Hajime Kamoshida. The game was part of the Mobile Suit Gundam: Iron Blooded Orphans G mobile game, which was released on November 15, 2022, and began to be released in 2022. Iron Blooded Orphans G ended service on January 11, 2024. An compilation film of Urðr Hunt, Mobile Suit Gundam: Iron-Blooded Orphans – Urðr Hunt Special Edition: Path of the Little Challenger, was released by Bandai Namco Filmworks on October 31, 2025 alongside a short film, Makuai no Kusabi.

=== Merchandise ===
Merchandising of the series is officially linked to Bandai's long running Gunpla model line and related collectable merchandise. Both the High Grade and 1/100 scale models of the titular mecha, Gundam Barbatos, were unveiled during the press conference and both stated for a Fall 2015 release, alongside the standard and commander versions of the HG Graze and weapon packs for the main mobile suit. A NXEDGE Style version of the Gundam Barbatos was also revealed. The titular gundam, Gundam Barbatos is also released as part of the Master Grade line of gunpla models.

== Reception ==
The series premiere received generally positive reviews from critics. Anime News Network's Nick Creamer gave the first episode a 4 out 5 stars, saying that "Iron-Blooded Orphans hits the ground running, establishing its world in the natural conversations of its many characters." He goes on to say that "Mari Okada's an inconsistent writer, but definitely a talented one, and given the focus of a traditional Gundam-style opening, her gift for illustrating character shines through." Zac Bertschy gave the series a 4.5 for the first episode, saying "Iron-Blooded Orphans has a lot of moving parts, but it's only deceptively complex; this episode starts out confusing (due to the relatively haphazard way they introduce all the various factions and the sizable cast) but as it goes on it all becomes very clear". He also adds "Instantly likable characters, desperate battles, a broad science fiction story about a colony struggling for independence, giant robots and even a Char-like smooth-talking pretty boy weirdo who's working with the bad guys; what's not to love?"

However, the series has received some criticism from the Japanese Broadcasting Ethics and Program Improvement Organization, regarding the harsh themes and depictions of child soldiers in the anime. They also stated that "several nonresistant prisoners and enemy soldiers are gunned down by the young male protagonist. If you look at the title, one would immediately think of this as a children's show and that many children would be watching.", referring to one scene in Episode 3, and that "If you want to broadcast such material, please provide some sort of age limit for viewers."

Preceded by Mobile Suit Gundam: The Origin	Gundam metaseries (production order); 2015–2017	Succeeded by Mobile Suit Gundam Thunderbolt
Preceded by Gundam: Requiem for Vengeance; Mobile Suit Gundam: Silver Phantom	Gundam metaseries (production order); 2024	Succeeded by Mobile Suit Gundam SEED Freedom Zero
