= Kamen Rider: Beyond Generations =

- Directed by: Takayuki Shibasaki
- Written by: Nobuhiro Mouri
- Based on: Kamen Rider by Shotaro Ishinomori
- Starring: Kentaro Maeda; Subaru Kimura (voice); Shuichiro Naito; Wataru Hyuga; Ayaka Imoto; Noritaka Hamao; Yui Asakura; Hayata Seki; Kurodo Hachijoin; Junya Komatsu; Kazuya Tanabe; Takaya Yamaguchi; Asuka Kawazu; Ryo Aoki; Yuki Ikushima; Eiji Togashi; Hiroaki Oka; Tomohiro Ichikawa; Mei Angela; Ken Shonozaki; Rina Chinen; Kurara Emi; Shigeyuki Totsugi; Arata Furuta; Akiyoshi Nakao
- Music by: Kōtarō Nakagawa; Kousuke Yamashita
- Production company: Toei TV Production Co., Ltd.
- Distributed by: Toei Company
- Release date: December 17, 2021
- Country: Japan
- Language: Japanese

Kamen Rider: Beyond Generations (仮面ライダー ビヨンド・ジェネレーションズ, Kamen Raidā Biyondo Jenerēshonzu) is a crossover film released on December 17, 2021, starring the casts of Kamen Rider Revice and Kamen Rider Saber. It serves to commemorate the franchise's 50th anniversary and is the 5th and final installment of the Generations Series.

== Production ==
The film also features a new Kamen Rider from a possible future in the year 2071, 100 years after the debut of the first Kamen Rider television series, called Kamen Rider Century. Additionally, actors Akiyoshi Nakao and Arata Furuta portrayed Ryunosuke and Hideo Momose, while Maito Fujioka, the son of Hiroshi Fujioka, portrayed Takeshi Hongo's younger self. The film was written by Nobuhiro Mouri and directed by Takayuki Shibasaki. The theme song is "Promise" performed by Da-ice. The events of the film take place between episodes 13 and 14 of the series.

== Synopsis ==
In the year 2021, the Devil of Mystery Diablo, who was sealed away in the Diablo Stamp, was released into the world. In the year 2071, 50 years from now, humanity has been enslaved by devils. Ryunosuke Momose, who transforms into Kamen Rider Century, travels to the year 2021 to defeat Diablo before he can gain the power to rule the world. Ikki Igarashi, Vice, and Touma Kamiyama join forces with Ryunosuke to prevent the uprising of a world soon to be dominated by devils.

== Plot ==
In an apocalyptic 2071 ruled by demons where humanity is enslaved, a young man named Ryunosuke Momose is rescued by an elderly George Karizaki, who tasks Ryunosuke with using his Cyclotron Driver to time travel his consciousness back to 2021 and save the world. To do so, he must work with his son Hideo from that era and become Kamen Rider Century. Remembering portions of his past, Ryunosuke agrees to do so.

In 2021, the Deadmans have reawakened the demon Diablo alongside his companions, the Crispers, who makes the Deadmans his “kin”. At Happy Spa, after receiving the patronage of Rintaro Shindo, Mei Sudo, Ryo Ogami, and Sora Ogami, whom Ikki met four months prior, Ikki witnesses an argument between Hideo Momose and his son Shinichi. After Hideo drops his work badge, Ikki decides to go to Hideo's workplace to return it.

The Himiko Crisper's attack on both Reika and Ryoga Shindai at the Southern Base attracted the attention of George Karizaki, who sends Daiji Igarashi to scout out a location for him to confirm his suspicions. In response, Rintaro is called to the Northern Base by Sophia to return the Kaenken Rekka to Touma Kamiyama.

As Ikki returns Hideo's badge, Ryunosuke arrives from the future in relief, but is unable to come into physical contact with anything. Diablo arrives and attacks the group, prompting Ikki and his inner demon Vice to transform. Ryunosuke forces Hideo to transform into Kamen Rider Century with him, but they go out of control as Century Break. After retreating with Century Break, Ikki and Vice receive assistance from Touma and Rintaro in returning the Momose father and son to normal.

On George’s request, Daiji scouts out the same base the Deadmans had released Diablo from, discovering the place to be an old Shocker laboratory. George explains that Diablo's stamp was found shortly after Giff's but was stolen by Shocker afterwards, who later deemed Diablo uncontrollable and sealed him away in the same lab. After a singularity was raised in Egypt, Yuri dispatches Ryo and Tetsuo Daishinji there to fight the Khufu Crisper.

Ryunosuke explains he time traveled from the past, to the future, and finally here to the present, but Hideo made it very clear that he didn't want to have anything to do with his father, who left him when he was a child. Rintaro reports that the Edison Crisper has appeared in Easter Island, and sends both Kento Fukamiya and Ren Akamichi there, with the former taking note of the "star" the Cripsers were trying to achieve. George, having become interested in the new "Kamen Rider Century" character, sends Hiromi Kadota and several Fenix soldiers to retrieve him. Diablo then arrives and announces Ryunosuke as his target. Touma holds him off, allowing an opportunity for Ikki to escape with Ryunosuke. Kento, Ren, Ryo, Tetsuo, Ryoga, and Reika all regroup at the Northern Base after a failed attempt at fighting each of their enemies. The Deadmans await at their base hoping the Cripsers and Diablo will bring Giff one step closer to his revival.

After escaping with Ikki, Ryunosuke tells him of his past: he was once a geneticist from 1971 whose work was dismissed because they were "demonic", which led to him being recruited by Shocker to continue his research. He helped them engineer captured humans into Shocker Kaijin, including Takeshi Hongo who famously became the first Kamen Rider. After Takeshi convinced him to use science for good instead, Ryunosuke attempted to escape from Shocker, but was captured and submitted as the first test subject for Diablo. After the demon went out of control and was sealed away, Ryunosuke was put on a ship and sent to drift for eternity, but not before entering a temporal wormhole that brought him to 2071 where he met George and gained the means to time travel.

He explains that Diablo cannot be defeated before his revival nor after gaining his complete form, hence the sole opportunity remained in 2021, while also admitting that this was his punishment for leaving his son in 1971. After Ikki convinced him to try to reconcile properly with Hideo, Ryunosuke's physical body in 2071 was in danger and left unprotected. He brings Ryunosuke to George to work out a plan, which included sending a team (consisting of Touma, Rintaro, Yuri, Vice, Daiji, and Sakura) to guard Ryunosuke's body in the future while several pairs (consisting of Kento, Tetsuo, Ryo, Reika, Ryoga, and Hiromi) fight the Cripsers worldwide. The international team use Book Gate Wonder Ride Books to travel, while the time traveling team is sent to the future using Ryunosuke's Cyclotron Driver. The future team meet the elderly George, who reveals the Clone Rider System he had been developing, allowing the team to use it to fight off the Devil Rider Corps.

While Ryunosuke goes to reconcile with Hideo, Ikki goes to Mount Fuji, where the heart of the star created by the singularities was. Ikki transforms into Revi to fight Diablo alone, but is completely overwhelmed. Ryunosuke and Hideo are able to reconcile and save Ikki in time. Their transformation into the true Kamen Rider Century has ramifications across the timeline, which eradicates the Devil Rider Corps in 2071, and returns both Ryunosuke's body and the future team to 2021, but not before the future George gives Vice the Neo Batta Vistamp. Sakura, Daiji, Rintaro, and Yuri are sent worldwide to help their allies, while Touma stays behind to help Ikki, Vice, and Century fight Diablo.

Century announces that he was created all for the sole purpose of fighting Diablo. After the international teams defeat the Crispers, Touma ascends to Xross Saber, and Revice accesses the new Neo Batta Genome. With their resolve to vanquish evil and change the future, they defeat Diablo for good using a combination of each of their respective Rider Kicks, and Diablo's ritual is canceled completely. With Diablo's defeat, Ryunosuke begins to fade away. While apologizing that he could not ride the bullet train with Hideo, Ryunosuke is visited by Takeshi's spirit, who expresses his gratitude towards Ryunosuke for giving birth to the legacy of Kamen Rider. Ryunosuke thanks Ikki and Touma for holding the 50-year long Rider legacy before vanishing from existence. In memory of his father, Hideo rides the bullet train with Shinichi while looking at his father's ticket in his hand.

== Cast ==
- Ikki Igarashi / Kamen Rider Revi - Kentaro Maeda『Kamen Rider Revice』
- Touma Kamiyama / Kamen Rider Saber - Shuichiro Naito『Kamen Rider Saber』
- Daiji Igarashi / Kamen Rider Live - Wataru Hyuga『Kamen Rider Revice』
- Sakura Igarashi / Kamen Rider Jeanne - Ayaka Imoto『Kamen Rider Revice』
- George Karizaki - Noritaka Hamao『Kamen Rider Revice』
- Hiromi Kadota / Kamen Rider Demons - Junya Komatsu『Kamen Rider Revice』
- Aguilera - Yui Asakura『Kamen Rider Revice』
- Orteca - Hayata Seki『Kamen Rider Revice』
- Julio - Kurodo Hachijoin『Kamen Rider Revice』
- Rintaro Shindo / Kamen Rider Blades - Takaya Yamaguchi『Kamen Rider Saber』
- Mei Sudo - Asuka Kawazu『Kamen Rider Saber』
- Kento Fukamiya / Kamen Rider Espada - Ryo Aoki『Kamen Rider Saber』
- Ryo Ogami / Kamen Rider Buster - Yuki Ikushima『Kamen Rider Saber』
- Ren Akamichi / Kamen Rider Kenzan - Eiji Togashi『Kamen Rider Saber』
- Tetsuo Daishinji / Kamen Rider Slash - Hiroaki Oka『Kamen Rider Saber』
- Yuri / Kamen Rider Saikou - Tomohiro Ichikawa『Kamen Rider Saber』
- Reika Shindai / Kamen Rider Sabela - Mei Angela『Kamen Rider Saber』
- Ryoga Shindai / Kamen Rider Durendal - Ken Shonozaki『Kamen Rider Saber』
- Sophia / Kamen Rider Calibur - Rina Chinen『Kamen Rider Saber』
- Yūjirō Wakabayashi / Chameleon Deadman - Kazuya Tanabe『Kamen Rider Revice』
- Yukimi Igarashi - Kurara Emi『Kamen Rider Revice』
- Genta Igarashi - Shigeyuki Totsugi『Kamen Rider Revice』
- Takeshi Hongo / Kamen Rider Ichigo - Maito Fujioka
- Eksekutif Shocker - Fumihiko Tachiki
- Shinichi Momose - Rento Uno
- Hideo muda - Toshimine Kido
- Ryunosuke Momose / Kamen Rider Century - Akiyoshi Nakao
- Hideo Momose / Kamen Rider Century - Arata Furuta

=== Voice cast ===
- Vice / Kamen Rider Vice - Subaru Kimura『Kamen Rider Revice』
- Diablo - Yōji Ueda
- Himiko Crisper - Rica Matsumoto
- Khufu Crisper - Toshiyuki Morikawa
- Edison Crisper - Ryūsei Nakao
- Leonidas Crisper - Tesshō Genda
- Shocker - Tomokazu Seki

== Theme song ==
「Promise」
Lyrics: Sōta Hanamura, MEG.ME
Composers: Sōta Hanamura, Louis (Natural Lag), Tomoki Fukuda (Natural Lag), MEG.ME
Arrangement: CHOKKAKU
Artist: Da-iCE
