= Noritaka Hamao =

Japanese actor and model (1999)

- Born: November 26, 1999 (age 26); Tokyo, Japan
- Occupations: Actor; model
- Years active: 2019–present
- Agent: Ken-On
- Notable work: Kamen Rider Revice
- Height: 185 cm (6 ft 1 in)

Japanese name
- Kanji: 濱尾 ノリタカ
- Hiragana: はまお ノリタカ
Transcriptions
- Romanization: Noritaka Hamao

Noritaka Hamao (濱尾 ノリタカ(はまお ノリタカ), Hamao Noritaka; born November 26, 1999) is a Japanese actor and model.

== Filmography ==
=== Film ===
Year	Title	Role	Notes	Ref.
2021	Kamen Riders Revice: The Movie	George Karizaki		
2021	Kamen Rider: Beyond Generations	George Karizaki		
2021	Kamen Rider Revice the Movie: Battle Familia	George Karizaki		
2022	Kamen Rider Geats × Revice: Movie Battle Royale	George Karizaki / Kamen Rider Juuga		
2022	The Great Yokai War: Guardians	Shuten-dōji		
2025	Wind Breaker	Togamejo		
2026	Mirrorliar Films Season 8	Shin	Lead role; anthology film	

=== Television ===
Year	Title	Role	Notes	Ref.
2020	Peanut Butter Sandwich	Igarashi Osamu		
2021	Kamen Rider Saber	George Karizaki		
2022	Kamen Rider Revice	George Karizaki / Kamen Rider Demons / Kamen Rider Juuga	Episodes 28, 47, and 48	
2022	Administrator King	Shuji Fukuzawa		
2022	Crescendo Advance	Nishikigi		
2023	It Is Not Good, Maybe.	Taniyama		
2023	Ōoku: The Inner Chambers	Sutezo	Episode 4	
2023	Saitama Host Club	Shotaro Hirakata		
2023	Black Postman	Yusuke Hase		
2023	My Second Aoharu	Kanta Tagami		
2024	What are You Doing on Saturday?!	Himself	Lead role	
2024	Laughing Matryoshka	Koichi Sasaki (young)		
2024	Geeks: Weirdos at the Police Station	Ryota Wakabayashi		
2024	Usotoki Rhetoric	Shiro Tokuda	Episode 9	
2024	Junkisaa Inyoung	Kanata Ohashi	Web series; episode 2	
2024	Kotokoto: A Journey to Meet The Delicious Heart-Toyama Edition	Sota Abiko		
2025	Unbound	Ichikawa Monnosuke	Taiga drama; episode 11	
2025	Anpan	Iwao Tagawa	Asadora; episodes 12-59, 122-126	
2025	Tokage Metropolitan Police Department Special Crimes Investigation Unit	Taku Mishima		
2025	Tomorrow Will Be a Better Day	Seiya Kiritani		
2025	Then You Try Making It!	Yanagisawa	Episode 9	
2026	Ramune Monkey	Tsurumi		
2026	Confrontation	Jun Nishimuri		
2026	Viral Hit	Tatsuya Ogi	Web series	
2026	Goodbye Noir	Yuya Ohno		
2026	Midnight Taxi			
2026	Mame to Mugi	Shiina Tane	Episode 2	

== Bibliography ==
=== Photobook ===
- Noritaka Hamao 1st Photobook "H3O" (October 20, 2023, Kodansha) ISBN 978-4-0653-3097-5
