= Viral Hit =

South Korean webcomic and media franchise

- Manhwa cover of Viral Hit/How To Fight volume 1

싸움독학 RR: Ssaumdokhak MR: Ssaumdokhak
- Genre: Action, Martial arts
- Author: Taejun Pak
- Illustrator: Kim Junghyun
- Webtoon service: Naver Webtoon (Korean); Line Manga (Japanese); Line Webtoon (English)
- Original run: November 15, 2019 – 2024
- Volumes: 10
- Anime television series
- Directed by: Masakazu Hishida
- Written by: Toshiya Ono
- Music by: Yutaka Yamada
- Studio: Okuruto Noboru
- Licensed by: Crunchyroll
- Original network: Fuji TV (+Ultra)
- Original run: April 11, 2024 – June 27, 2024
- Episodes: 12
- Live-action television series
- Viral Hit (2026)

Viral Hit

Korean name
- Hangul: ^싸움독학
Transcriptions
- Revised Romanization: Ssaumdokhak
- McCune–Reischauer: Ssaumdokhak

Japanese name
- Kanji: 喧嘩独学
- Kana: けんかどくがく
Transcriptions
- Romanization: Kenka Dokugaku

Viral Hit (Korean: 싸움독학; RR: Ssaumdokhak, Japanese: 喧嘩独学, romanized: Kenka Dokugaku, lit. 'How to Fight') is a South Korean manhwa released as a free webtoon written by Taejun Pak and illustrated by Kim Junghyun. It has been serialized via Naver Corporation's webtoon platform Naver Webtoon since November 2019, with the individual chapters being collected and published into ten volumes as of June 2025.

The webtoon has been published in English by Line Webtoon since October 2022; and also published in Japan by Line Manga since April 2020. An anime television series adaptation produced by Okuruto Noboru aired from April to June 2024 on Fuji TV's +Ultra programming block. A Japanese-language live-action television series premiered on Netflix in June 2026.

== Plot ==
The plot stars Yoo Ho-bin, a bullied high school student with a mother sick with cancer. One day, after a fight with one of his bullies, Woo Ji-hyuk, goes viral, Yoo Ho-bin decides to start a NewTube channel, and fight bullies to earn money. He learns how to fight with the assistance of a mysterious NewTuber with a rooster mask.

== Characters ==
The main cast of Viral Hit.

Yoo Ho-bin (유호빈; Yu Hobin)
Voiced by: Satoshi Niwa (Japanese); Brandon Acosta (English)
Japanese name: Kota Shimura (志村光太, Shimura Kota)
Woo Ji-hyuk (우지혁; U Jihyeok)
Voiced by: Nobuhiko Okamoto (Japanese); Jessie James Grelle (English)
Japanese name: Toru Kaneko (金子亨, Kaneko Toru)
Ga Eul (가을; Ga Eul)
Voiced by: Fairouz Ai (Japanese); Trina Nishimura (English)
Japanese name: Aki Yashio (八潮秋, Yashio Aki)
Choi Bo-mi (최보미; Choe Bomi)
Voiced by: Yui Ishikawa (Japanese); Molly Zhang (English)
Japanese name: Kaho Asamiya (朝宮夏帆, Asamiya Kaho)
Ppakgo (빡고)
Voiced by: Shunsuke Takeuchi (Japanese); Corey Wilder (English)
Japanese name: Hamaken (ハマケン)
Seong Tae-hoon (성태훈; Seong Taehun)
Voiced by: Kaito Ishikawa (Japanese); Austin Tindle (English)
Japanese name: Reo Shinjo (新庄玲央, Shinjo Reo)
Yeo Roo-mi (여루미; Yeo Rumi)
Voiced by: Yoshino Aoyama (Japanese); Morgan Lauré (English)
Japanese name: Rumi Meguro (目黒ルミ, Meguro Rumi)
Kim Moon-seong (김문성; Gim Munseong)
Voiced by: Yuichi Nakamura (Japanese); Ricco Fajardo (English)
Japanese name: Tatsuya Ōgi (扇達也, Ōgi Tatsuya)
Ssamdak (쌈닥)
Voiced by: Tomokazu Sugita (Japanese); Chris Rager (English)
Japanese name: Tou-Kei (闘鶏, Tōkei)

== Media ==
=== Webtoon ===
Created by Taejun Pak and illustrated by Kim Junghyun, the manhwa has been serialized as a webtoon in Naver's webtoon platform Naver Webtoon since November 15, 2019, and has been published in English by Line Webtoon since October 2022. It is also published in Japan by Line Manga since April 4, 2020.

No.	Korean release date	Korean ISBN
1	July 31, 2021	979-1-19-122588-4
2	February 15, 2022	979-1-16-769031-9; 979-1-16-769065-4 (SE)
3	June 16, 2022	979-1-16-769134-7
4	September 30, 2022	979-1-16-769169-9
5	February 15, 2023	979-1-16-769193-4
6	July 15, 2023	979-1-16-769231-3
7	December 15, 2023	979-1-16-769284-9
8	December 15, 2023	979-1-16-769285-6
9	May 15, 2024	979-1-16-769298-6
10	June 30, 2025	979-1-16-769358-7

=== Anime ===
An anime television series adaptation was announced on February 10, 2024. The series is produced by Okuruto Noboru and directed by Masakazu Hishida, with Toshiya Ono writing series scripts, Satomi Miyazaki designing the characters, Yutaka Yamada composing the music, and production handled by Slowcurve. It aired from April 11 to June 27, 2024, on Fuji TV's +Ultra programming block. (Note: Fuji TV lists the series premiere on April 10, 2024 at 24:55, which is effectively April 11 at 12:55 a.m. JST.) The opening theme song is "Wild Boy", performed by MA55IVE THE RAMPAGE, while the ending theme song is "Viral Hack", performed by Crab Kani Club. Crunchyroll streamed the series.

==== Episodes ====
No.	Title (Note: All English titles are taken from Crunchyroll.)	Directed by (Note: Information is taken from the ending credits of each episode.)	Written by	Storyboarded by	Original release date
1	"First Upload"; Transliteration: "Hatsu Tōkō" (Japanese: 初投稿)	Masakazu Hishida	Toshiya Ōno	Masakazu Hishida	April 11, 2024
2	"I Have to Become Stronger"; Transliteration: "Tsuyoku Naranakya" (Japanese: 強くならなきゃ)	Hitomi Ezoe	Toshiya Ōno	Masakazu Hishida	April 18, 2024 (Note: This episode aired at 1:25 a.m. JST, 30 minutes after the original air time on Fuji TV.)
3	"The Date"; Transliteration: "Dēto" (Japanese: デート)	Masakazu Hishida	Toshiya Ōno	Masakazu Hishida	April 25, 2024 (Note: This episode aired at 1:10 a.m. JST, 15 minutes after the original air time on Fuji TV.)
4	"Humiliation"; Transliteration: "Kutsujoku" (Japanese: 屈辱)	Masakazu Hishida	Toshiya Ōno	Masakazu Hishida	May 2, 2024 (Note: This episode aired at 1:15 a.m. JST, 20 minutes after the original air time on Fuji TV.)
5	"Friends"; Transliteration: "Tomodachi" (Japanese: 友達)	Masakazu Hishida	Toshiya Ōno	Masakazu Hishida	May 9, 2024
6	"The Devil"; Transliteration: "Akuma" (Japanese: 悪魔)	Masakazu Hishida	Kakuzō Nanmanji	Masakazu Hishida	May 16, 2024 (Note: This episode aired at 1:05 a.m. JST, 10 minutes after the original air time on Fuji TV.)
7	"Special Training"; Transliteration: "Tokkun" (Japanese: 特訓)	Masakazu Hishida, Yuki Iwasaki	Kakuzō Nanmanji	Masakazu Hishida	May 23, 2024
8	"A Real Fight"; Transliteration: "Jissen" (Japanese: 実戦)	Masakazu Hishida	Toshiya Ōno	Masakazu Hishida	May 30, 2024
9	"Friends"; Transliteration: "Tomodachi" (Japanese: 友達)	Yuki Iwasaki	Toshiya Ōno	Masakazu Hishida	June 6, 2024
10	"A New Opponent"; Transliteration: "Aratana Teki" (Japanese: 新たな敵)	Hitomi Ezoe	Kakuzō Nanmanji	Masakazu Hishida	June 13, 2024
11	"A Tight Feeling in the Chest"; Transliteration: "Mune ga Kurushī" (Japanese: 胸が苦しい)	Takahiko Kyōgoku	Toshiya Ōno	Masakazu Hishida	June 20, 2024
12	"Joy"; Transliteration: "Shiawase" (Japanese: 幸せ)	Masakazu Hishida	Toshiya Ōno	Masakazu Hishida	June 27, 2024

=== Live-action TV series ===
A Japanese-language live-action television series adaptation of the manhwa was announced by Netflix, with Myriagon Studio and Raku Film as the producing studios. The series premiered on June 11, 2026 on Netflix for six episodes.

== Reception ==
In 2022, the webtoon was selected as a jury-recommended work in the manga section of the 25th Japan Media Arts Festival.

In Japan, Viral Hit garnered 460 million views and 2 billion in global by February 2024.

The anime series' first episode received negative assessments in the Spring 2024 season previews from Anime News Network critics. Richard Eisenbeis understood its premise was aimed at a specific demographic but was put off by Hobin being an "unlikable idiot" and the central character they are supposed to connect with. Nicholas Dupree criticized the overall production for being a "never-ending assault on the senses" and the "embarrassing writing" using the broadest strokes to create a story where its cast is "a twisted caricature of a typical anime stereotype". Rebecca Silverman was confident in the premise moving towards a positive direction with future episodes but criticized the mean and distasteful scenario Hobin gets into and the "spectacularly ugly" production, concluding that: "All in all, I can't think of a premiere I enjoyed less this season."

Anime News Network had two editors review the first manhwa volume in 2025: Bolts was critical of Hobin's circumstances being "a little too heightened and convenient" and bordering into "unintentional comedy" at points, but praised the narrative for delivering "great commentary on the dark side of content creation and bullying" and the character artwork striking "a healthy balance of realism and exaggeration", calling it "one of the more relatable webtoons that I have read. If you're familiar with content creation, as a creator or a consumer, you would get something out of this." MrAJCosplay called it a "modern day underdog story" that shows the "most relatable aspects of [our] modern society" and may hit too close for readers with similar experiences.
