= I Cannot Reach You =

Japanese manga series

- First tankōbon volume cover

君には届かない。 (Kimi ni wa Todokanai)
- Genre: Boy's love; Coming of age
- Manga
- Written by: Mika
- Published by: Media Factory
- English publisher: NA: Yen Press
- Imprint: MFC Gene Pixiv Series
- Magazine: Gene Pixiv
- Original run: November 23, 2018 – present
- Volumes: 10
- Television drama
- Directed by: Masahide Izumi
- Written by: Maki Hiraki
- Studio: TBS Sparkle
- Licensed by: Netflix
- Original network: TBS
- Original run: September 19, 2023 – November 7, 2023
- Episodes: 8

I Cannot Reach You (君には届かない。, Kimi ni wa Todokanai) is a Japanese manga series written and illustrated by Mika. It began serialization on Media Factory's Pixiv Comic-based Gene Pixiv website in November 2018. An 8-episode live-action television drama adaptation aired from September to November 2023.

== Synopsis ==
Yamato and Kakeru are childhood friends. Yamato excels academically and is considered attractive, while Kakeru's grades are barely average and his appearance is considered ordinary. Despite being childhood friends, Kakeru only thinks of Yamato as a "great person." Unbeknownst to Kakeru, Yamato has strong romantic feelings for him.

== Characters ==
Kakeru (カケル)
Voiced by: Yūsuke Kobayashi (drama CD)
Portrayed by: Haru Kashiwagi
Yamato (ヤマト)
Voiced by: Hirofumi Nojima (drama CD)
Portrayed by: Kentaro Maeda

== Media ==
=== Manga ===
Written and illustrated by Mika, I Cannot Reach You began serialization on Media Factory's Pixiv Comic-based Gene Pixiv website on November 23, 2018. Its chapters have been compiled into ten tankōbon volumes as of December 2025.

During their panel at the Virtual Crunchyroll Expo in 2020, Yen Press announced that they licensed the series for English publication.

A manga anthology was released on November 27, 2023.

No.	Original release date	Original ISBN	English release date	English ISBN
1	June 27, 2019	978-4-04-065776-9	March 9, 2021	978-1-9753-1947-2
1. "Confession"; 2. "Reason"; 3. "Social Mixer 1"; 4. "Social Mixer 2"; 5. "Yamato and Mikoto"; 6. "Speaking Up"
2	December 26, 2019	978-4-04-064222-2	June 29, 2021	978-1-9753-1949-6
7. "Misunderstanding"; 8. "A Bright Place"; 9. "A Warm Place"; 10. "Flustered"; 11. "Excuse"; Extra: 1. "I Want to Touch It"; 2. "Experiment"; 3. "A Chill Evening"; 4. "Watching a Meteor Shower"
3	August 27, 2020	978-4-04-064862-0	January 25, 2022	978-1-9753-3812-1
12. "Flipped Upside-Down"; 13. "School Trip Memories 1"; 14. "School Trip Memories 2"; 15. "School Trip Memories 3"; 16. "School Trip Memories 4"; 17. "School Trip Memories 5"
4	March 27, 2021	978-4-04-680280-4	May 17, 2022	978-1-9753-3820-6
18. "We're Through"; 19. "A Memory That Cannot Be Erased"; 20. "Can I Still Like You?"; 21. "Heart-Pounding"; 22. "That's So Unfair"; Extra: "On the Slopes"
5	November 27, 2021	978-4-04-680879-0	December 13, 2022	978-1-9753-5156-4
23. "Something Precious"; 24. "Not Just Yet"; 25. "Christmas Night"; 26. "More Than Nothing"; 27. "The Day It Started"; Extra: "New Year's Greetings"
6	June 27, 2022	978-4-04-681447-0	May 23, 2023	978-1-9753-6915-6
28. "Secret"; 29. "Fireworks"; 30. "Light"; 31. "Once Spring Comes"; 32. "Self-Conscious"; Extra: "The Boy from That Day"
7	March 27, 2023	978-4-04-682150-8	February 20, 2024	978-1-9753-8045-8
33. "I Want to Tell Him"; 34. "What I Want to Say"; 35. "What Couldn't Be Said"; 36. "Mental Feelings"; 37. "What Truly Matters"
8	October 27, 2023	978-4-04-682929-0	November 19, 2024	979-8-8554-0544-6
38. "Because You're My Boyfriend"; 39. "Let Me Care About You"; 40. "Spring Camp (Daytime)"; 41. "Spring Camp (Nighttime)"
9	February 27, 2025	978-4-04-684224-4	May 26, 2026	979-8-8554-2835-3
42. "Little by Little"; 43. "Change"; 44. "Something Gone Wrong!"; 45. "Decision"; Extra: "Summer Rain"
10	December 27, 2025	978-4-04-685436-0	February 23, 2027	979-8-8554-4820-7
11	January 27, 2027	978-4-04-660708-9; 978-4-04-660705-8	—	—

=== Light novel ===
A spin-off light novel written by Kotoko Hachijou, titled I Cannot Reach You: Our Cultural Festival, was released on March 27, 2021.

No.	Release date	ISBN
1	March 27, 2021	978-4-04-680281-1
2	April 26, 2024	978-4-04-683520-8

=== Drama ===
A live-action television drama adaptation was announced on April 23, 2023. The drama aired on Netflix from September 19 to November 7 and on TBS the following week that same year. The drama starred Haru Kashiwagi and Kentaro Maeda as the two leads.

=== Other media ===
A drama CD adaptation was released in the January 2020 issue of Monthly Comic Gene published on December 26, 2019. It contained the performances of Yūsuke Kobayashi and Hirofumi Nojima as the two leads and Aoi Koga, Takuya Makimura, Taichi Kusano, Shohei Tanaka and Nene Hieda in other unnamed roles.

== Reception ==
By December 2025, the series had over 1 million copies in circulation.
