= O Maidens in Your Savage Season =

Japanese manga and anime series

- First volume cover

荒ぶる季節の乙女どもよ。 (Araburu Kisetsu no Otome-domo yo)
- Genre: Coming-of-age
- Manga
- Written by: Mari Okada
- Illustrated by: Nao Emoto
- Published by: Kodansha
- English publisher: NA: Kodansha USA
- Imprint: Shōnen Magazine Comics
- Magazine: Bessatsu Shōnen Magazine
- Original run: December 9, 2016 – September 9, 2019
- Volumes: 8
- Anime television series
- Directed by: Masahiro Andō; Takurō Tsukada
- Produced by: Airi Sawada; Morio Kitaoka; Hiroyuki Aoi
- Written by: Mari Okada
- Music by: Moe Hyūga
- Studio: Lay-duce
- Licensed by: BI/NA: Sentai Filmworks; SA/SEA: Muse Communication
- Original network: MBS, TBS, BS-TBS, AT-X
- Original run: July 5, 2019 – September 20, 2019
- Episodes: 12
- Television drama
- Directed by: Mai Sakai; Aya Igashi; Keita Mizunami
- Written by: Mari Okada
- Music by: Masaru Yokoyama
- Original network: MBS, TBS
- Original run: September 8, 2020 – October 28, 2020
- Episodes: 8
- icon

O Maidens in Your Savage Season (Japanese: 荒ぶる季節の乙女どもよ。, Hepburn: Araburu Kisetsu no Otome-domo yo) is a Japanese manga series written by Mari Okada and illustrated by Nao Emoto. It was serialized in Kodansha's shōnen manga magazine Bessatsu Shōnen Magazine from December 2016 to September 2019, with its chapters collected in eight tankōbon volumes. The manga is licensed in English by Kodansha USA.

An anime television series adaptation produced by Lay-duce was broadcast on MBS's Animeism programming block from July to September 2019. A live-action television series adaptation was broadcast from September to October 2020.

== Characters ==
Kazusa Onodera (小野寺 和紗, Onodera Kazusa)
Voiced by: Hiyori Kono (Japanese); Brittney Karbowski (English)
Portrayed by: Anna Yamada
Sugawara's friend and Izumi and Momoko's childhood friend. Since childhood, she has been in love with Izumi, but all this time she was afraid to take a step forward, while the mockery of more popular classmates did not motivate her to be more active in an attempt to attract his attention. However, as the story progresses, she notices that Izumi is clearly sexually attracted to Sugawara’s outstanding beauty and tenderness.
Niina Sugawara (菅原 新菜, Sugawara Niina)
Voiced by: Chika Anzai (Japanese); Natalie Rial (English)
Portrayed by: Tina Tamashiro
Kazusa's friend, a melancholic girl who the guys call a "crane" because of her fragile beauty. Initially, Niina ignores the boys because of a harassment experience in her childhood but gradually begins to develop feelings for Izumi because of his caring and kindness. Thus, her loyalty to her friend and their common love of one boy quickly becomes one of the main conflicts of the story. She gets along well with Momoko, who quickly becomes her friend because of her adoration and unconscious romantic feelings for Sugawara.
Momoko Sudō (須藤 百々子, Sudō Momoko)
Voiced by: Momo Asakura (Japanese); Juliet Simmons (English)
Portrayed by: Mei Hata
A shy girl and best friend of Kazusa. Initially, she, like other girls, begins to be interested in relationships with guys, but as the story progresses, she is becoming more and more aware of her desire and interest in other girls, that the first time she perceives as a simple misunderstanding of the reasons for the girl's interest in guys. Subsequently, she begins to develop a one-sided crush on Sugawara, whose potential feelings for Izumi are causing her deep depression.
Rika Sonezaki (曾根崎 り香, Sonezaki Rika)
Voiced by: Sumire Uesaka (Japanese); Avery Smithhart (English)
Portrayed by: Mayuu Yokota
The president of a literary club, a tall, prudish girl who is ashamed of her interest in the opposite sex because of her strict upbringing and serious nature. Nevertheless, in spite of her purism, she gets the most healthy relationship with guys compared to other girls. Over time she comes to realize that romantic affection and sexual attraction are not the same thing, thus she begins to lower her guard and starts a relationship with Shun Amagi.
Hitoha Hongō (本郷 ひと葉, Hongō Hitoha)
Voiced by: Tomoyo Kurosawa (Japanese); Elissa Cuellar (English)
Portrayed by: Shuri Tanaka
A mysterious short girl who writes novels, including erotica. She maintains a relationship as Hitoto-san with Milo-san in an online adult chatroom. When her publisher describes her first novel as if it was written by a virgin 40-year-old man, she decides to gain sexual experience and arranges to meet up with an online user, but discovers the user's identity as Milo, a member of the school faculty. Following this revelation, Hitoha tries to initiate a relationship with Milo despite the latter's attempts to discourage her.
Izumi Norimoto (典元 泉, Norimoto Izumi)
Voiced by: Shimba Tsuchiya (Japanese); Blake Jackson (English)
Portrayed by: Mizuki Inoue
Kazusa's childhood friend and the subject of interest from her and Sugawara. A kind and caring young guy, he doesn't have any sexual experience or knowledge about love in general, therefore his problems with the differentiation of love and sexual attraction quickly become the cause of a love triangle and a conflict between him and two girls.
Tomoaki Yamagishi (山岸 知明, Yamagishi Tomoaki)
Voiced by: Jun Fukuyama (Japanese); Gareth West (English)
Portrayed by: Yuki Furukawa
A young male teacher who is blackmailed into being the advisor for the Literature Club by Hitoha, in the absence of their former advisor and imminent disbanding. He is given the nickname Milo-sensei by Hitoha and is called by that nickname by the rest of the club. When Milo agrees to an online meet-up with another user and later realizes that his meet-up was with Hitoha, he runs away and tries to deter her attempts in initiating a relationship.
Shun Amagi (天城 駿, Amagi Shun)
Voiced by: Yūya Hirose (Japanese); Gabriel Regojo (English)
Portrayed by: Oshiro Maeda
A boy infatuated with Sonezaki even when her class looked down on her.
Hisashi Saegusa (三枝久, Saegusa Hisashi)
Voiced by: Shunsuke Sakuya (Japanese); Wesley Whitson (English)
Portrayed by: Shingo Tsurumi
A famous director, who also works in acting classes for little children, including one Sugawara attended.
Sonoe Jūjō (十条 園絵, Jūjō Sonoe)
Voiced by: Haruka Tomatsu (Japanese); Alicia Beard (English)
A gyaru girl who Sonezaki detests, however she becomes friendlier to Sonezaki over time.
Satoshi Sugimoto (杉本 悟, Sugimoto Satoshi)
Voiced by: Natsuki Hanae (Japanese); Leraldo Anzaldua (English)
Portrayed by: Shunji Tagawa
A boy who attends the same cram school as Momoko and tries to start a relationship with her.

== Media ==
=== Manga ===
Written by Mari Okada and illustrated by Nao Emoto, O Maidens in Your Savage Season was serialized in Kodansha's shōnen manga magazine Bessatsu Shōnen Magazine from December 9, 2016, to September 9, 2019. Kodansha collected its chapters in eight tankōbon volumes, released from April 7, 2017, to October 9, 2019.

In North America, the manga was licensed for English release by Kodansha USA. The eight volumes were published from April 23, 2019, to November 3, 2020.

==== Volumes ====
No.	Original release date	Original ISBN	English release date	English ISBN
1	April 7, 2017	978-4-06-395905-5	April 23, 2019	9781642128475
2	August 9, 2017	978-4-06-510108-7	June 18, 2019	9781632368195
3	December 8, 2017	978-4-06-510546-7	August 20, 2019	9781632368201
4	April 9, 2018	978-4-06-511203-8	October 15, 2019	9781632368508
5	August 9, 2018	978-4-06-512182-5	December 17, 2019	9781632368515
6	December 7, 2018	978-4-06-513480-1	February 18, 2020	9781632369178
7	July 9, 2019	978-4-06-515723-7	August 18, 2020	9781632369185
8	October 9, 2019	978-4-06-516789-2	November 3, 2020	9781632369925

=== Anime ===
An anime television series adaptation was announced on November 30, 2018. The series was animated by Lay-duce and directed by Masahiro Andō and Takurō Tsukada, with Mari Okada handling series composition, and Kaori Ishii designing the characters. Moe Hyūga composed the music. The series aired from July 5 to September 20, 2019, on the Animeism programming block on MBS, TBS, and BS-TBS, as well as AT-X. CHiCO with Honeyworks performed the series' opening theme song "Otome-domo yo" (乙女どもよ), while Momo Asakura performed the series' ending theme song "Yume Cinderella" (ユメシンデレラ). Sentai Filmworks has licensed the series worldwide excluding Asia, Germany, France, and Australia. In Southeast Asia and South Asia, Muse Communication holds the show's rights.

==== Episodes ====
No.	Title	Directed by	Original release date
1	"The Taste of Her Pork Miso Soup"; Transliteration: "Tonjiru no aji" (Japanese: 豚汁の味)	Takurō Tsukada	July 5, 2019
2	"Es Ee Ecks"; Transliteration: "Esuibatsu" (Japanese: えすいばつ)	Tōru Yoshida	July 12, 2019
3	"Willy's Real Rear Wheel"; Transliteration: "Basu gasu bakuhatsu" (Japanese: バスガス爆発)	Takashi Kumazen	July 19, 2019
4	"The Purpose of Books"; Transliteration: "Hon to iu sonzai" (Japanese: 本という存在)	Takurō Tsukada; Shōta Hamada	July 26, 2019
5	"Things That Changed Before We Knew It"; Transliteration: "Watashi o shiranu aida ni kaeta mono" (Japanese: 私を知らぬ間に変えたもの)	Shigeru Fukase	August 2, 2019
6	"Maidens in the Woods"; Transliteration: "Otome wa mori no naka" (Japanese: 乙女は森のなか)	Daisuke Kurose	August 9, 2019
7	"Jiggling, Then, After"; Transliteration: "Yure, no, sono saki" (Japanese: 揺れ、の、その先)	Miki Sakaibara	August 16, 2019
8	"Legend of Love"	Hodaka Kuramoto	August 23, 2019
9	"The Orange Fox's Lilies"; Transliteration: "Kitsunenokamisori" (Japanese: キツネノカミソリ)	Hayato Sakai	August 30, 2019
10	"Holes"; Transliteration: "Ana" (Japanese: 穴)	Takashi Kumazen	September 6, 2019
11	"Inappropriate Conduct Between the Sexes is Now Forbidden"; Transliteration: "Danjo kōsai kinshirei" (Japanese: 男女交際禁止令)	Kobayashi Takatsugu	September 13, 2019
12	"The Colors of the Hearts of Maidens"; Transliteration: "Otomegokoro no iroiro wa" (Japanese: 乙女心のいろいろは)	Takurō Tsukada; Masahiro Andō; Miki Sakaibara	September 21, 2019

=== Drama ===
A live-action television series adaptation was announced on July 9, 2020. On July 30, 2020, the main cast list and the production crew was announced, as well as that the series would be premiered on MBS and TBS on September 8, 2020.

==== Episodes ====
No.	Original release date
1	September 9, 2020
2	September 16, 2020
3	September 23, 2020
4	September 30, 2020
5	October 7, 2020
6	October 14, 2020
7	October 21, 2020
8	October 28, 2020

== Reception ==
The series was positively received. In a review of the first episode for Anime Feminist, Caitlin Moore described the series as joining series such as Please Tell Me! Galko-chan, Yamada’s First Time, and Asobi Asobase and films like The To-Do List and Booksmart with "smart, funny, and honest humor about the weirdness that is adolescence." She said that the series is "bluntly authentic" in drawing from Mari Okada's own experiences, appreciates the experiences in a small group of "socially awkward teenage girls who aren’t having sex," with recognition that sex extends beyond "simple penetration and can be about female pleasure," and said it remains to be seen whether the series will "account for the distinct experiences of queer, asexual, and trans teens." In a review of the first three episodes on the same site, Vrai Kaiser wrote that this series "hit a chorus of raw nerves about sexuality and adolescent anxieties with pointed accuracy" and described it as heartening for the series to "acknowledge queerness with Momoko," which differs from her "platonic protectiveness over Kazusa," and criticizes the blackmail plot involving Mithoha and her teacher, arguing that such thought experiences feel "woefully out of touch with the overwhelmingly unaddressed problems of teens being preyed on by adults," saying that it feels contrived and jarring, a "sour note against the refreshing honesty the rest of the show has to offer." Kaiser later recommended the series for tacking "internalized misogyny," awkwardness around adolescence and sex, Niina's struggles as victim of her acting coach's grooming, and Momoko being a lovable and well-realized queer character who is "trapped in an unrequited love plot," but criticized it for Hongo attempting to seduce her teacher as playing into narratives which absolves predators, and said it crashes because its "ambitions are so high." He also said the series should have content warnings for pedophilic grooming, groping without consent, masturbation, queerphobia, fat shaming, and an unsuccessful relationship between a teacher and student.

Rebecca Silverman reviewed the series for Anime News Network. In her review of the first three episodes, she notes that the series is primarily focused on "girls and female sexuality," and isn't easily defined as a sex comedy because it feels "too true to life," and predicted that the series will be a "frank discussion of developing female sexuality and the stigmas that can come with it." In reviews of later episodes, Silverman said that the series hits on "familiar situations," noting that for teenage girls these melodramas are "serious life and death stuff," but criticized the series for being a little overwhelming if each series "tries to cover all five characters each week" and describes Hongo's relationship with Milo-sensei as "the most uncomfortable storyline." Other reviews for episodes 7, 8, and 9, Silverman said it is important that the series includes a "narrative that can be read as queer," praised the series for doing a "great job with its rollercoaster of emotions" by the characters, that parts of the series "hit too close to home," and called the use of The Little Prince, by Antoine de Saint-Exupéry, as "particularly interesting."
