= Laughing Matryoshka =

2021 Japanese novel

Laughing Matryoshka (Japanese: 笑うマトリョーシカ) is a Japanese drama based on the novel written by Kazumasa Hayami, which was published by Bungeishunjū on November 5, 2021, aired on TBS's "Friday Drama" slot starting June 28, 2024.

== Synopsis ==
Toshiya Suzuki has known Ichiro Seike, a popular politician, since high school. Suzuki recognized that Seike had the potential to be a politician since then. And now, as his secretary, he is devoted to making Seike a prime minister. They look like a perfect match. But for reporter Kanae Michiue, something feels off about their relationship, including the fact that Suzuki's name is not revealed in Seike's autobiography, a mystery that seems to be related to the secretary's past. She begins to investigate them and notices the mysterious deaths surrounding Seike's rise in politics. Her own father's death is somehow connected.

== Cast ==
- Asami Mizukawa as Tōto Shinbun reporter Kanae Michiue
- Sho Sakurai as Minister of Health, Labor and Welfare Ichiro Seike
  - Yuzu Aoki as Seike (in University)
- Tetsuji Tamayama Seike's former classmate, and current secretary, Toshiya Suzuki
  - Nishiyama Jun as Suzuki (in University)

=== Government people ===
- Masei Nakayama as Kazunori Sakamoto, Seike's office secretary
- Akira Otaka as Prime Minister Habu Masafumi
- Kenichi Yajima as Ikuo Morohashi Minister of Foreign Affairs
- Shigemitsu Ogi as Kazuhiro Takechi, representative from Ehime. Seike had been his private secretary, and replaced him when he died.
- Tomiyuki Kunihiro as Norinaga Fujita, Takechi's former policy manager
- Mutsuo Yoshioka as Togashi, a former secretary in Morohashi's staff

=== Michiue's family ===
- Mariko Tsutsui as Kaori Michiue,Michiue's mother, owner of Rinka Restaurant
- Ikkei Watanabe as Kanetaka Michiue, Michiue's father
- Masato Wada as Kentaro Hatade, Michiue's ex-husband
- Yurito Mori as Yūki Hatade, Michiue and Hatade's son

=== Seike's family ===
- Katō Masaya as Yoshitaka Wadajima, Seike's father (as revealed in Seike's autobiography), also a politician
- Saki Takaoka as a mysterious woman. She is Seike's mother, Hiroko Seike
  - Rin Mizushima as young Hiroko (ep 9)
- Kenjiro Nashimoto as Yoshikazu Seike, Hiroko Seike's ex-husband and Ichiro's stepfather
- Masami Horiuchi as Masashige Komatsu, Hiroko's current husband and former Psychiatrist. (ep. 9 & 10)

=== Suzuki's family ===
- Tatsurō Kawano as Suzuki's father
- Sei Matobu introduced in episode 4 as a mysterious woman who gazes at the back of Michiue as she leaves the hospital where Suzuki is revealed later to be his wife

=== Tōto Shinbun ===
- Tomomi Maruyama as Takashi Yamanaka, a senior reporter
- Ryōsuke Sota as Naoki Aoyama, a junior reporter

=== Seike's Uni era ===
- Momoko Tanabe as "Mieko", Seike's University era girlfriend The name is a pseudonym used in Seike's book. She went by the name of Miwako Miyoshi in her school years, but her true name, Arisa Manaka, was revealed in a script she had written, which named her as author. Revealed as Reiko Tadokoro, a helper in Hiroko and her current husband's home (ep 9 & 10) in their current era
- Dai Watanabe as Koichi Sasaki Suzuki and Seike's former classmate, and political supporter, chef and owner of the restaurant where Seike and Michiue meet to talk.
  - Noritaka Hamao as Sasaki (in University)
- Toshihide Tonisaku as Kiyohiko Isshiki, Fukuin's principal

=== Other ===
- Sakuya as Rinrin, part-time worker at Rinka
- Misa Wada as Reiko Tadokoro, a helper in Hiroko and her current husband's home, revealed to be Arisa Manaka after undergoing plastic surgery

== Plot ==
As the drama opens, new Cabinet's recently appointed Minister of Health, Labor and Welfare, Ichiro Seike, a young politician, candidate to be the next Prime Minister, gives a press conference Yoshitaka Wadajima, Chief Cabinet Secretary who gave a support speech when Seike first ran for office, was Seike's father, fact unknown for years, until revealed in Seike's autobiography, died of cancer the year before. They never lived together..

Tōto Shinbun reporter, Kanae Michue, went to Seike's hometown to learn more about this charismatic politician. Nothing seems to be as sunny as his disposition. When Michue goes to his alma-mater, she learns that Seike's image there is far from the reliable image he has today. She also learns about Toshiya Suzuki, his former mentor and current secretary. It is surprising that Seike never mentions him in his autobiography. Another person of interest is Koichi Sasaki, Seike and Suzuki's former classmate. Sasaki is chairman of Seike's Supporters' Association. Chef by trade, as his father, he owns "Haruyoshi", a restaurant in his hometown of Matsuyama. However, it seems that there is more to the person than meets the eye.

Michiue's parents divorced 5 years before. Michiue's mother, Kaori, runs the family restaurant. She is very supportive of her daughter, who struggles to balance work and family time. Michiue is also divorced. She and Kentaro Hatade separated after an incident from a scoop involved her family. They decided to divorce to protect their only child, an elementary school aged boy. Hatade has custody of their son, but is still in contact with Michiue.

Michiue receives a sudden call from her father, Kanetaka, of whom she was distanced. Kanetaka, a major newspaper's social affairs reporter, had been investigating a bribery case, known as the "BG stock case". Time had passed since. Kanetaka retook the story and wanted advice from Michiue. While on the phone, Kanetaka is killed in a freak traffic accident. Michiue starts investigating fatal accidents that seem related to Seike's rise to power. One of those may be her own father's.

Michiue tries in vain to talk to Suzuki regarding the BG case and the link to her father's death. She takes the chance when an opportunity to talk to Seike opens, confronting Suzuki during the interview. Later, Michiue receives a call from Seike. They talk about their lives. Michiue had received the (incomplete) belongings found in her late father's car, among which were keys to a bank safe, and some notebooks, which, shortly after Michiue examined them, were stolen. The notebooks had information about the BG case, in which Suzuki's father was allegedly involved. Michiue's suspicions about Suzuki grow, and become strengthened by words that Seike told her after their meeting: "From now on, keep your eyes on me too" (just like with her son), making her think Seike may have been manipulated by Suzuki, and could be in danger. During one of their one-on-one meetings, Seike receives a call informing him that Suzuki had an accident, while Michiue learns that Aoyama, a junior colleague, was in that incident. Both are in the hospital.

Michiue tries to gather more information, but is met with resistance from Seike's office, threatening to stop all meetings with him. Michiue notices a strange similarity between Suzuki and so-called "Hitler Mentalist" Erik Jan Hanussen: besides having influence on their respective person, their ages coincided. Hanussen was 43 when he died, Suzuki was 43 at the time of what could have been a fatal accident. As she continues investigating who Seike really is, and if any of the incidents are related to Suzuki, Michiue thinks about "Mieko", Seike's girlfriend in university. Could she be involved? This makes her focus shift from Suzuki to "Mieko". At the same time, Suzuki, still in the hospital, reminisces about "Mieko" and how, for him, she became a crutch in Seike's road into politics.

Michiue continues prodding into the "Mieko mystery". She discovers from a former Seike classmate, and confirms from Fujita, Takechi's former policy manager, that the woman's name is Miwako Miyoshi, and that her dream was to be a screenwriter. The classmate also tells her that Miwako applied for a competition with a script modeled after Seike, called "The Last Laughing Matryoshka", details of which Miwako had told Suzuki. Michiue goes to the University where Miwako was supposed to have studied in, only to learn that no one under that name registered there. Michiue then goes to Suzuki and, with his help, gets ahold of the script, finding out that the author was not Miwako, but "Arisa Manaka", prompting Michiue to think it could be a false name.

With her sights set in the Seike/Mieko case, Michiue's journalistic work begins to falter, forcing the newspaper to pressure her, so she quits to become a freelance journalist and concentrate on her task. Seike calls her and, in the few moments they are alone, he tells her he will not contact her again, that he is doing it for her sake, that as she is watching out for him, so is he watching out for her. As he is driven away, he turns to see a still wondering Michiue standing on the sidewalk.

Michiue goes to Miwako/Manaka's family home and learns important facts about her. With all the information that Michiue has shared with Suzuki, he starts having flashbacks to when he and Seike were in university. About him and Seike, them and Miwako... and of them and Hiroko, Seike's mother, a mysterious (and probably dangerous) person that Michiue saw at her mother's restaurant, and of whom Suzuki has hidden the fact that he knows.

Something keeps bothering Michiue, as she continues to investigate Hiroko, whose presence seems to overshadow Seike's political dream. With the probability that Hiroko may have orchestrated the deaths of her ex-husband, Yoshikazu Seike, as well as Councilor Takechi, and the apparent certainty that she controls Seike, Michiue is sure that he must not be allowed to have power. And what Michiue discovers after following Hiroko gives definition to Seike's words.

Seike is appointed Chief Cabinet Secretary. His and Suzuki's wish continues to see light. But unexpectedly, Seike calls Suzuki into his office and fires him. Feeling betrayed, and facing the reality that Seike used him, Suzuki goes to Michiue and helps her keep uncovering the truth on Hiroko. Suzuki uses the information Michiue has in an attempt to clear the image of his father, whose identity was revealed in a magazine. Noticing the news about the Secretary of the former Foreign Minister, they decide to visit his widow, who tells them that he didn't commit suicide as reported, but was killed. As more and more information arises, including about the intimate relationship Suzuki had with Hiroko, Michiue goes on the road to search for her, when she finds Seike in one of his public meetings. Michiue asks him about his firing Suzuki. Seike takes Michiue's hands and pulls her to him, and whispers "I didn't do it because I wanted to".

Yamanaka, Michiue's former colleague and current boss, finds information about the time Hiroko was working as a hostess in Ginza. Michiue finds herself being followed, and, as she tries to flee, she runs into Hiroko. Michiue tries to confront her about the deaths, but Hiroko counters with a comment about Michiue's son's safety, previous to leaving. The man with whom Hiroko leaves is the same that had been following Michiue. Michiue later goes to Sasaki's shop, where she learns that Seike will return to his hometown to give a lecture. She also receives a message from him saying "Please, don't be reckless". Information is also learned about Seike's grandmother, Hiroko's mother. She was a Chinese woman that had a relationship with a Japanese man, whom she didn't have contact from after Hiroko's birth. It is thought that her constant use of the word "revenge" permeated in both Hiroko's and Seike's early childhood.

With Suzuki's help, the journalist team find out the whereabouts of Togashi, a former secretary during the disappearance of Morohashi. They assume that it was Togashi who covered up Morohashi's involvement in the BG stock incident. Michiue meets Hiroko again, and this time they talk about Hiroko's past with a Chinese mother and how in affected her. They continue to talk about other things, including the reference to a tape that has information from the BG case, and that Hiroko is holding to. In a meeting, Seike proposes a new "prime ministerial election system" in which the prime minister is chosen by direct vote of the people. Michiue thinks this could be seen as a stepping stone for Seike.

Michiue begins to think differently about Hiroko, as her words reveal that she is estranged from Seike. Michiue now has another problem in her hands. If Hiroko wasn't the one who had sent Suzuki the paper that Seike had written about Hitler and Hanussen, who did? She returned to Hiroko's house to talk to her husband, while a mysterious woman appears to overhear their conversation (and the one with Hiroko, before). It is their helper, Reiko Tadokoro. Michiue begins suspecting Tadokoro is involved... and she is! Turns out that Tadokoro is in reality Arisa Manaka, the woman who Seike had a relationship in their college era. If Manaka was at Hiroko's house, that could mean that she probably was still trying to find a way to get close to Seike, or finding ways to continue influencing him, even if not by his side.

Just as facts continue to be revealed one after another, Michiue receives a sudden proposal from Seike: he tells her "Stay by my side" (said in a form that could be seen as romantic). Michiue thinks that by being by his side, she can find out who is Seike's Hanussen, she decides to accept the proposal. Not only has he asked for opinions from Michiue every time they meet, he reacts to them and puts them into his own words. This has happened since the first time they met. Michiue feela a certain sense of fulfillment. Yamanaka urges Michiue to disclose the evidence of those involved in the BG case as soon as possible and to oust them, but Michiue thinks that if she antagonizes the government, she will be taken off as Seike's assistant, and that worries her.

Michiue continues to think about the words that Seike has told her ("Please look at me", ""I won't see you anymore", "As you see out me, so do I", and now, "Stay by my side"). What is their true meaning? Seike knows that he needs people around him that "feed him" information, but he has to be careful in the way he gets to them. It started with his grandmother, his mother, his father, Suzuki, Manaka... and now Michiue. He needs Michiue to be by his side as a guide, but also as part of the press, to share to the public his political activities. But he has to act carefully not to alienate Michiue, making her think he's playing with her skills as a reporter and taking advantage of that. He does care for her, but not in a romantic way. He knows that she could be in danger if she gets too close to the truth (just as Takechi, Suzuki and Kanetaka did), and relays the message in very subtle ways, by using those words.

== Music ==
Theme song, "Sunshade", lyrics by singer-songwriter Yuuka and music by One Ok Rock's Toru, is sung by its lyricist.
