= Fureru =

2024 Japanese anime film

- Promotional poster
- ふれる。
- Directed by: Tatsuyuki Nagai
- Written by: Mari Okada
- Produced by: Genki Kawamura
- Starring: Ren Nagase; Ryota Bando; Kentaro Maeda; Haruka Shiraishi; Manaka Iwami; Sarutoki Minagawa; Kenjiro Tsuda
- Cinematography: Yūya Sakuma
- Edited by: Shigeru Nishiyama
- Music by: Masaru Yokoyama; TeddyLoid
- Production company: CloverWorks
- Distributed by: Toho; Aniplex
- Release date: October 4, 2024
- Running time: 107 minutes
- Country: Japan
- Language: Japanese

Fureru (Japanese: ふれる。; lit. 'Touch') is a 2024 Japanese animated film directed by Tatsuyuki Nagai and written by Mari Okada. Distributed by Toho and Aniplex, the film premiered in Japan on October 4, 2024.

== Plot ==
Aki Onoda, Ryō Sobue, and Yūta Inohara, are childhood friends attending the elementary school. Aki investigates the Shinto shrine in the island cave, meets a yellow tailed hedgehog Fureru, and adopts it as a pet. When the boys touch each other and hear their inner voices, they are caught by Fureru's magical power within the fur. In the aftermath, they cannot hear their inner voices in isolation when touching each other.

A decade later, the trio move to Takadanobaba in Shinjuku, and become house renting tenants on a leasehold estate. Fureru stays at home, Aki becomes a chef and bartender, Ryō becomes a real estate agent, and Yūta studies at the fashion university. That night, Fureru knocks a thief off the bridge, before Aki retrieves a purse owned by Nana Asakawa. The trio invites Nana and her bodyguard Juri Kamozawa to stay at the house. When Aki, Ryō, and Yūta invite Juri and Nana at the bar, they break up with each other. The night before being ambushed and wounded while alone, Nana identifies a real stalker as the school's impersonating teacher, Kohei Shimada. While Nana recovers at the hospital, Juri tells the trio that Kohei has been repeatedly eavesdropping on Juri and Nana. Back at the house, the trio are visited by their folklore teacher Wakita. He narrates the story about Fureru in the island with fertile soil: it connects the mind to people during ancient times. The villagers struggle to cheat over resources, but found Fureru in the cave. It helps everyone unite and oppose minds which can be removed before thoughts can convey with hearts. Aki, Ryō, and Yūta stack their hands, but they still cannot hear and sense their voices.

The next day, Aki, Ryō, and Yūta argue, suffer mental breakdown, and prepare to move on. However, the frightened Fureru traps them in the parallel world. They manage to escape from there by overcoming negative emotions and reconciling with each other. Back in the real world, the trio discovers magical threads driving everyone mad in town. As they follow it to the stadium in Ochiai Central Park, Aki comforts Fureru, by climbing up to the tower and zip lining the threads that he had connected on his finger. Fureru transforms into a white living ball and the threads vanish from the town, reverting the minds of people into an original state. After the police arrest Kohei, Aki, Ryō, Yūta, Juri, and Nana, reconcile and remain friends. Aki and Fureru part ways from Ryō and Yūta, after leaving the house for an expired lease.

== Voice cast ==
Characters	Japanese	Description
Aki Onoda	Ren Nagase	A part-time bartender and Fureru's owner. He and his friends are not well at communication.
Ryō Sobue	Ryota Bando	A real estate agent.
Yūta Inohara	Kentaro Maeda	A fashion student with a hang-up.
Juri Kamozawa	Haruka Shiraishi	Nana's bodyguard.
Nana Asakawa	Manaka Iwami	A fashion student named after the real-life actress.
Wakita	Sarutoki Minagawa	A university folklorist, and the teacher of Aki, Ryō, and Yūta.
Kohei Shimada	Kenjiro Tsuda	A stalker and the assistant teacher of Nana and Yūta.

== Production ==
The film was revealed in December 2023, with Nagai served as a director and Okada as a writer. It premiered on October 4, 2024. The theme song "Monotone" is performed by Yoasobi. Crunchyroll streamed the film on January 15, 2026.
