= The Anthem of the Heart =

2015 Japanese animated film directed by Tatsuyuki Nagai

- Promotional poster, featuring Jun Naruse

Japanese name
- Kanji: 心が叫びたがってるんだ。
- Literal meaning: My Heart Wants to Shout
Transcriptions
- Revised Hepburn: Kokoro ga Sakebitagatterunda
- Directed by: Tatsuyuki Nagai
- Screenplay by: Mari Okada
- Created by: Super Peace Busters
- Produced by: Shunsuke Saito
- Starring: Inori Minase; Koki Uchiyama; Sora Amamiya; Yoshimasa Hosoya; Yō Yoshida; Keiji Fujiwara
- Narrated by: Koki Uchiyama
- Cinematography: Hiroyuki Moriyama
- Edited by: Shigeru Nishiyama
- Music by: Mito; Masaru Yokoyama
- Production company: A-1 Pictures
- Distributed by: Aniplex
- Release date: September 19, 2015 (Japan)
- Running time: 119 minutes
- Country: Japan
- Language: Japanese
- Box office: US$8.85 million

The Anthem of the Heart (Japanese: 心が叫びたがってるんだ。, Hepburn: Kokoro ga Sakebitagatterunda; lit. 'My Heart Wants to Shout'), subtitled Beautiful Word Beautiful World, is a 2015 Japanese animated youth drama film produced by A-1 Pictures and released in 2015. The film was directed by Tatsuyuki Nagai and written by Mari Okada. Masayoshi Tanaka served as the chief animation director and designed the characters. The trio, under the creative team name of Super Peace Busters, had previously worked on Toradora! and Anohana: The Flower We Saw That Day. The film was released in theaters in Japan on September 19, 2015.

The Anthem of the Heart received several accolades, including Best Animated Feature at the 36th Anima Festival, Best Rookie Voice Actor (Minase) at the 25th Japanese Movie Critics Awards; it was also nominated for Animation of the Year at the 39th Japan Academy Film Prize and Tokyo Anime Award Festival 2016.

== Plot ==
As a young girl, Jun Naruse loved fairy tales and the castle on the hilltop, which was a love hotel.

One day, she saw her father leaving the love hotel. Not realising the significance of it, she exposes her father's infidelity. Her father blames her for the family conflict that follows. While she is crying, she imagines a fairy egg that curses her by sealing her words, so she won't hurt people again.

As a result of her "curse", Jun is not able to speak and suffers stomachaches whenever she tries to speak.

Years later, when Jun is attending high school, her homeroom teacher, Kazuki Jōshima, signs her up as a member of the Community Outreach Event along with three other classmates: shy computer music researching club member Takumi Sakagami, cheerleader and honor student Natsuki Nitō and former baseball team ace Daiki Tasaki, who has a broken elbow.

When she goes to the committee's room to reject her position, Jun hears Takumi singing and is captivated. She then tells Takumi about her past using her phone, and requests for him to turn her words into a song. In this way, Jun learns that though she cannot speak, the 'curse' doesn't affect her if she sings. Her class decides to perform a musical for their school festival based on the story of her experience narrated in the form of a fairy tale.

While discussing the musical, Daiki has a falling out with his teammates. Jun intervenes, which leads to another stomachache, but this improves her bonds with the other Committee members. Misunderstanding Takumi's concern for Jun as a sign that he is falling in love with her, Natsuki tells Takumi that she will cheer them on, despite Natsuki's feelings for Takumi.

The next day, Daiki makes amends with his teammates. As they spend time together preparing for the musical, Jun starts to develop feelings for Takumi, while Daiki starts to develop feelings for Jun. Daiki asks Takumi about his relationship with Natsuki, having heard rumors that both of them were dating during middle school, but Takumi denies this since Natsuki had told her classmates that they were not dating when she was asked. Natsuki also tells Daiki that she currently has a boyfriend. On the night before the musical, Takumi asks Natsuki about the boy she's dating currently, leading Natsuki to finally reveal that the boy she's referring to is none other than Takumi himself before she accuses him of falling in love with Jun. Takumi reveals that while he is concerned about Jun, he is not in love with her and he has always regretted not trying to convey his feelings for Natsuki during middle school even when he was aware of her feelings for him at that time. Unbeknownst to them, Jun overhears their conversation. Heartbroken, she runs away and meets the fairy egg, who reveals that she has worsened the curse by trying to convey her feelings for Takumi. Jun doesn't show up on the day of the musical, leaving Natsuki to fill her role while Takumi frantically goes searching for her.

Takumi finds Jun at the love hotel that has been shut down. To his surprise, she can talk normally. Jun angrily lashes out at Takumi as he tells her that the reason she is unable to convey her words is not because of the fairy egg's curse but because of Jun's fear. Wanting to hear her voice once more, Takumi allows Jun to lash out all of her anger and frustration until she is satisfied. Jun confesses her feelings for Takumi, but it is revealed that Takumi is still in love with Natsuki, to which Jun replies that she knew. Takumi then expresses his gratitude for Jun because before he met her, he was unable to say what he truly felt and only went along with everyone else. This convinces Jun to perform in the musical. Jun and Takumi arrive just in time before the final scene, allowing Jun to sing and convey her feelings to her mother who finally understands what she has been through. As the musical ends, Jun realizes that the fairy egg was actually nothing but imagination that she created to have someone she could blame for her condition, and now she decides to open up her heart, coming to terms with her past.

As the movie ends, Takumi and Natsuki reconcile their relationship, while Daiki finally confesses his feelings to Jun.

== Characters ==
Jun Naruse (成瀬 順, Naruse Jun)
Voiced by: Inori Minase
Jun is the protagonist. She was originally a very upbeat, cheerful child, but after she exposed her father's unfaithfulness to her mother, she became quiet, timid and unable to speak. She later finds her voice by joining Takumi and the others in making a musical, in which she plays the main character.
Takumi Sakagami (坂上 拓実, Sakagami Takumi)
Voiced by: Koki Uchiyama
Takumi is another central character, who like Jun, is also quiet and timid. Like Jun, his parents are divorced, and he lives in the care of his grandparents. He plays piano, and played a major role in helping Jun set up the musical for the Charity Committee.
Daiki Tasaki (田崎 大樹, Tasaki Daiki)
Voiced by: Yoshimasa Hosoya
As a member of the school's baseball team, he is initially seen as grumpy and fully rejects the idea of the musical. Through the course of the movie, he learns to warm up to his classmates, and plays a central role in the musical. He also starts to develop feelings for Jun, and eventually confesses his feeling to her.
Natsuki Nitō (仁藤 菜月, Nitō Natsuki)
Voiced by: Sora Amamiya
Takumi's ex-girlfriend, still has feelings for Takumi. Though initially reluctant to join the musical, she warms up, and becomes a close friend of Jun. It is suggested Daiki had feelings for her, though she rejected them.
Fairy Egg
Voiced by: Koki Uchiyama
A small mystical being resembling a white egg that only Jun can see. He has a thin mustache, two black dots for eyes, while wearing a tuxedo and a fedora hat with a feather on top. After Jun accepted his request to help her as a child, the Fairy Egg put a curse on her and sealed her mouth closed so that she will never speak and hurt people ever again. In the end, he is revealed to be a fragment of Jun's imagination. He has a black spot floating around his left hand and when he hides it, he turns into a prince which is a pun with the kanjis of tamago (玉子; 'egg') and ōji (王子; 'prince').

== Release ==
The film was released in theaters in Japan on September 19, 2015. The film's main theme song is "Ima, Hanashitai Dareka ga Iru" (今、話したい誰かがいる) performed by Nogizaka46. Aniplex of America released the film in North America on November 11 of the same year.

== Reception ==
=== Box office ===
During its first five days in Japan, The Anthem of the Heart sold approximately 235,000 tickets, earning over ¥300 million. By November 1, 2015, the film had earned ¥1,015,293,050 (about US$8.43 million) in the Japanese box office. The film grossed US$8.85 million worldwide.

=== Critical response ===
The review aggregator website Rotten Tomatoes reports that 63% of critics have given the film a positive review, with an average rating of 7.8/10. The site's critics consensus reads, "Anthem of the Heart is an excellent anime, whose truly captivating story will satisfy anyone who will succumb to it".

Nick Creamer of Anime News Network (ANN) rated the film a B+ rating. In his review, he said that despite the last act being hampered by typical dramatic tropes, he praised the film for its well-written characters, grounded storytelling and classically minded soundtrack, concluding with, "It's an endearing little film that tells one small story with some real grace. Definitely recommended." Fellow ANN editor Zac Bertschy placed the film at number four on his top 5 best anime list of 2015, calling it "a sweet, lighthearted and sincere little drama" with solid character animation and emotional moments, and commended it for using the medium's limitless potential to tell its story regardless of genre, concluding with, "I imagine any other country on earth creating an animated film like Anthem of the Heart. Every now and then you've got to stop and recognize the truly unique things about anime that are still true – like the fact that it tells stories with animation that no one else does".

Writing for IGN, Kallie Plagge was concerned about the ending stating that "The Anthem of the Heart falls flat toward the end" but she also praised other aspects of the film saying, "The animation looks great, and its tone is balanced nearly perfectly" giving it an overall rating of 8.2/10.

=== Accolades ===
Year	Award	Category	Recipient(s)	Result	Ref.
2016	39th Japan Academy Film Prize	Animation of the Year	The Anthem of the Heart	Nominated	
2016	49th Sitges Film Festival	Best Animated Feature	The Anthem of the Heart	Nominated	
2016	Tokyo Anime Award Festival 2016	Animation of the Year (Film)	The Anthem of the Heart	Nominated	
2016	25th Japanese Movie Critics Awards	Best Rookie Voice Actor	Inori Minase	Won (Note: Shared with Mai Fuchigami.)	
2016	6th Newtype Anime Awards	Best Picture (Film)	The Anthem of the Heart	Nominated	
2016	6th Newtype Anime Awards	Best Soundtrack	The Anthem of the Heart	Nominated	
2017	36th Brussels International Animation Film Festival	BeTV Award for Best Animated Feature	The Anthem of the Heart	Won	

== Live-action film ==
A live-action film adaptation was announced in March 2017. Directed by Naoto Kumzawa, it stars Kyoko Yoshine, Kento Nakajima, Anna Ishii, and Ichiro Kan. Filming began in March 2017 in Chichibu, Saitama, and the film was released on July 22, 2017.
