= Viral Hit (TV series) =

2026 Japanese television series

- 喧嘩独学
- Genre: Action; Martial arts; Coming of age
- Based on: Viral Hit by Taejun Pak and Kim Junghyun
- Written by: Yūichi Tokunaga
- Directed by: Hideki Takeuchi
- Starring: Ouji Suzuka; Arata Sugou; Meru Nukumi; Ai Mikami; Kentaro Maeda
- Composer: FACE 2 FAKE
- Country of origin: Japan
- Original language: Japanese
- No. of seasons: 1
- No. of episodes: 6

Production
- Executive producer: Yuta Fukui (Netflix)
- Producers: Naoto Inaba; Shigeji Maeda
- Running time: 45-53 minutes
- Production companies: Myriagon Studio; Raku Film

Original release
- Network: Netflix
- Release: June 11, 2026

Viral Hit (Japanese: 喧嘩独学) is a 2026 Japanese live-action television series based on the South Korean webtoon of the same name. It premiered on June 11, 2026 on Netflix.

== Plot ==
The plot follows Kōta Shimura, a bullied high school student, as he learns how to fight. To pay for his mother Miyuki's cancer treatment, he teams up with his former bully Kanegon and a female student called Aki to produce viral videos, after learning how to fight from a mysterious man in a chicken mask.

== Cast ==
- Ouji Suzuka as Kōta Shimura
- Arata Sugou as Tōru "Kanegon" Kaneko
- Meru Nukumi as Kaho Asamiya
- Kentaro Maeda as Reo Shinjō

== Production ==
Viral Hit was originally supposed to air on May 28, 2026 but was delayed two weeks. The series premiered on June 11, 2026.

Glim Spanky's song "Ikari wo Kureyo" was used as the ending theme.

== Reception ==
Decider gave Viral Hit a "stream it" rating.
