= Mari Okada =

Japanese screenwriter (born 1976)

- 岡田 麿里
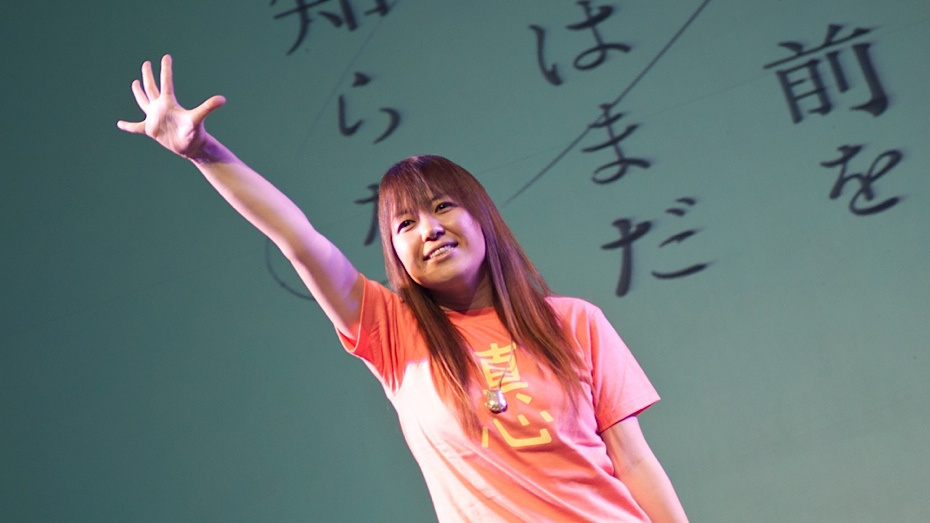
- Okada at the 2011 Anime Festival Asia
- Born: April 23, 1976 (age 50); Chichibu, Saitama, Japan
- Occupations: Screenwriter, director

Mari Okada (Japanese: 岡田 麿里, Hepburn: Okada Mari; born 23 April 1976) is a Japanese screenwriter, director, and manga artist. She is one of the most prolific writers currently working in the anime industry. She won the 16th Animation Kobe Award.

Among her credits, Okada is best known for her writing and producing work on acclaimed anime series and films, including Toradora!, Anohana, Gosick, The Pet Girl of Sakurasou, Maquia: When the Promised Flower Blooms, and her original manga series and its anime adaptation O Maidens in Your Savage Season.

== Early life ==
Okada was born in Chichibu, Saitama. She has stated that she was often bullied at school and was thus truant to deal with social anxiety. She would consequently spend most of her time alone at home writing stories. She has stated that her focus on art gradually helped her deal with her anxiety and resocializing. She added that no acquaintances in her life "had high hopes for her" and that she was repeatedly told that she "would not survive in the real world."

She enrolled at the Tokyo Amusement Media School to study entertainment industry and game design.

== Career ==
While studying, Okada developed a passion for screenwriting, but found it difficult to take it seriously as a profession due to her social anxiety. Her earliest jobs included creating scenarios for direct-to-video pornography and transcribing interviews for a magazine. It was through this latter job that she met Tetsurō Amino, who asked her to contribute some of her ideas for the plot of DT Eightron. She went on to write the script for five episodes, and the connection with Amino helped in kickstarting her career. Okada pitched an idea for her first original anime, based on her experience. The screenplay was unpublished, but several elements of it would be used in some of her works.

After several years, her reputation within the industry had grown considerably, with the screenplay for numerous successful series. Okada wrote the script for her directorial debut anime film Maquia: When the Promised Flower Blooms. It was well received by critics and was awarded the prize for best animated film at the 21st Shanghai International Film Festival.

== Works ==
=== Manga ===
- O Maidens in Your Savage Season (2016–2019; writer)
- Sistar Resistar (2024– ; collaboration with Makoto Ojiro)

=== Television ===
- DT Eightron (1998; screenplay, eps. 9, 15, 17, 20, 22)
- Angel Tales (2001; screenplay, eps. 1-13)
- Crush Gear Nitro (2003; screenplay, eps. 9, 17, 19, 30-31, 40-41, 48)
- Hamtaro (2003; screenplay, eps. 146, 152, 157, 165, 172, 177, 185, 191, 197, 202, 204, 208, 217, 223, 228, 233, 238-239, 243, 248, 255)
- Popolocrois (2003; screenplay, eps. 5, 9, 17, 20, 24)
- Diamond Daydreams (2004; screenplay, eps. 3-4, 7)
- Kyo kara Maoh! (2004; screenplay, eps. 5, 11-12, 17, 22, 28, 32, 39, 44, 47, 49, 52, 58, 61, 65, 70)
- Rozen Maiden (2004; screenplay, eps. 4, 8-9)
- Basilisk (2005; screenplay, eps. 3, 6, 12, 14, 16, 20)
- Canvas 2: Niji Iro no Sketch (2005; scenario, eps. 3, 5, 11, 14, 22)
- Animal Yokochō (2005; scenario, eps. 62, 66, 78, 92)
- Rozen Maiden: Träumend (2005; screenplay, eps. 4, 9, 11)
- Fate/stay night (2006; screenplay, eps. 4, 9, 12, 16, 20, 24)
- Aria – The Natural (2006; screenplay, eps. 9-10, 14, 23)
- Simoun (2006; screenplay, eps. 12-13, 15-16, 18, 20-21, 23-24)
- Sasami: Magical Girls Club (2006; series composition)
- Red Garden (2006; screenplay, eps. 5, 8, 13, 17-18, 21-22)
- Venus to Mamoru (2006; series composition)
- Sketchbook ~full color'S~ (2007; series composition)
- Kodomo no Jikan (2007; series composition)
- True Tears (2008; series composition)
- Vampire Knight (2008; series composition)
- Toradora! (2008; series composition)
- Black Butler (2008; series composition)
- Kyo kara Maoh! 3rd Series (2008; screenplay, ep. 22)
- Canaan (2009; series composition)
- Tatakau Shisho (2009; series composition)
- Darker Than Black: Gemini of the Meteor (2009; series composition)
- Black Butler II (2010; series composition)
- Otome Yōkai Zakuro (2010; series composition)
- Gosick (2011; series composition)
- Fractale (2011; series composition)
- Wandering Son (2011; series composition)
- Anohana (2011; series composition)
- Hanasaku Iroha (2011; series composition)
- Aquarion Evol (2012; series composition)
- Black Rock Shooter (2012; series composition)
- Lupin the Third: The Woman Called Fujiko Mine (2012; series composition)
- AKB0048 (2012; series composition)
- Blast of Tempest (2012; series composition)
- The Pet Girl of Sakurasou (2012; series composition)
- AKB0048 next stage (2013; series composition)
- Ganbare! Lulu Lolo - Tiny Twin Bears (2013; screenplay, eps. 6-10, 21-23)
- Nagi-Asu: A Lull in the Sea (2013; series composition)
- Selector Infected WIXOSS (2014; series composition)
- M3: The Dark Metal (2014; series composition)
- Selector Spread WIXOSS (2014; series composition)
- Gourmet Girl Graffiti (2015; series composition)
- Mobile Suit Gundam: Iron-Blooded Orphans (2015; series composition)
- Kiznaiver (2016; series composition)
- The Lost Village (2016; series composition)
- Dragon Pilot: Hisone and Masotan (2018; series composition)
- Rinshi!! Ekoda-chan (2019; screenplay, ep. 2)
- O Maidens in Your Savage Season (2019; series composition, original creator)
- Oni: Thunder God's Tale (2022; screenplay)

=== Original video animation ===
- Dead Girls (2007; screenplay)
- Kodomo no Jikan: Anata ga Watashi ni Kureta Mono (2007; series composition)
- Kodomo no Jikan Nigakki (2009; series composition)
- Kodomo no Jikan: Kodomo no Natsu Jikan (2011; series composition)
- Rurouni Kenshin: New Kyoto Arc (2011; series composition)
- Koitabi: True Tours Nanto (2013; series composition)
- Zetsumetsu Kigu Shojo Amazing Twins (2014; series composition)
- Winter Oath, Summer Festival, Takeo Ōkusu (2016; screenplay)
- Cup's Promise, First Love of Arita (2016; screenplay)

=== Anime films ===
- Kaiketsu Zorori: Quest For The Mysterious Treasure (2006; screenplay)
- Cinnamon the Movie (2007; screenplay)
- Hanasaku Iroha: The Movie – Home Sweet Home (2013; screenplay)
- Kaiketsu Zorori: Uchu no Yusha-tachi (2015; screenplay)
- The Anthem of the Heart (2015; screenplay)
- Maquia: When the Promised Flower Blooms (2018; director, screenplay)
- Her Blue Sky (2019; screenplay)
- Kimi dake ni Motetainda (2019; screenplay)
- A Whisker Away (2020; screenplay)
- Maboroshi (2023; director, screenplay)
- Fureru (2024; screenplay)

=== Live-action films ===
- My Teacher (2017; screenplay)
- Ankoku Joshi (2017; screenplay)
- The Flowers of Evil (2019; screenplay)
