= Kentaro Maeda =

Japanese actor and performer (born 1999)

- 前田 拳太郎
- Born: September 6, 1999 (age 27); Saitama Prefecture, Japan
- Education: Dokkyo University - Economics
- Occupation: Actor
- Years active: 2021–present
- Agent: LDH Japan
- Relatives: Kokoro Maeda (sister)

Kentaro Maeda (前田 拳太郎, Maeda Kentarō; born September 6, 1999) is a Japanese actor and a former member of the theater group Gekidan Exile.

== Personal life ==
Maeda was born in Saitama Prefecture on September 6, 1999. His sister, Kokoro Maeda, is a member of the idol girl group Hello! Project.

While in kindergarten, he aspired to star in Kamen Rider which led to him becoming an actor. In addition, he graduated from Dokkyo University, Faculty of Economics.

== Career ==
While in university, he was selected as one of the "BEST 30" at the 31st Junon Superboy Contest, but was rejected in the subsequent screening and initially gave up on his dream of becoming an actor. He later joined the university's ballroom dance club, but the club activities were suspended due to the COVID-19 pandemic. It was during that time that he thought about the future. He then searched for an agency to fulfill his dream becoming an actor.

He started taking acting lessons at EXPG studio in the summer of 2020.

In April 2021, Maeda appeared in the TV Tokyo drama Rules of Romantic Comedy: Complicated Girls and Younger Boys. On July 1, 2021, he became affiliated with LDH JAPAN. On September 5, 2021, he played Ikki Igarashi/Kamen Rider Revi in the special effects TV drama Kamen Rider Revice. Maeda joined Gekidan Exile on November 1, 2022.

== Filmography ==
=== Film ===
Year	Title	Role	Notes	Ref.
2024	Fureru	Yuta Inohara (voice)		
2025	One Last Throw	Fumiya Hojo		
2026	Kyoto-o	Haruma Takao	Lead role	

=== Television ===
Year	Title	Role	Notes	Ref.
2021	Rules of Romantic Comedy: Complicated Girls and Younger Boys		Episode 1	
2021	Kamen Rider Saber Special Issue	Ikki Igarashi		
2021	Kamen Rider Revice	Ikki Igarashi	Lead role	
2023	Goddess's Classroom: Legal Youth White Paper	Takuma Mizusawa		
2023	My Wife	Ran Hanazuma		
2023	I Cannot Reach You	Yamato	Lead role	
2023	Special Order! Metro Police Special Accounting Department!	Hisashi Tsukimura		
2024	Matsumoto Seicho Drama Special 1st night "Face"	Wataru Morio		
2024	Shinsengumi: With You I Bloom	Kamagiri Daisaku	Lead role	
2024	Darwin Goes!?	Daichi Urushibara		
2024	Smiling Lady	Hiroki Nonomiya		
2024	D&D: Doctor and Detective's Investigation Line	Shinji Makino		
2025	Betrayal Meals in a Place Like This: Seven Executives Calling for a Storm	Rintaro Shinjo		
2025	Pararescue Jumper	Tomoki Shirakawa		
2026	Dark 13: Dancing Zombie School	Mouse		
2026	Rock Paper Landmine	Hayato Kunugi		
2026	Viral Hit	Rio Shinjō	Web series	

=== Web series ===
- Kamen Rider Revice series
  - Kamen Rider Revice The Mystery (January 30, 2022 – February 27, Telasa) - as Ikki Igarashi / Kamen Rider Revi
  - Revice Legacy Kamen Rider Vail Episodes 1 and 5 (March 27, 2022 – May 22, 2022, Toei Special Effects Fan Club) - as Ikki Igarashi
  - TTFC Direct from the Market Theater Kamen Rider Revice (May 29, 2022, Toei Special Effects Fan Club) -
  - Kamen Rider Revice the Movie spin-off drama Birth of Chimera (July 22, 2022, Toei Special Effects Fan Club) - as Ikki Igarashi
  - Kamen Rider Juuga VS Kamen Rider Orteca (April 30, 2023 – May 7, 2023) - as Ikki Igarashi
- My Wife Special Edition (June 21, 2023, FOD) - as Ran Hanazuma
