= Anohana =

2011 anime series directed by Tatsuyuki Nagai

- Anohana: The Flower We Saw That Day
- Key visual

あの日見た花の名前を僕達はまだ知らない。 (Ano Hi Mita Hana no Namae o Bokutachi wa Mada Shiranai)
- Genre: Coming-of-age; Supernatural drama
- Created by: Super Peace Busters: Tatsuyuki Nagai; Mari Okada; Masayoshi Tanaka
- Serial novel
- Written by: Mari Okada
- Published by: Media Factory
- Imprint: MF Bunko Da Vinci
- Magazine: Da Vinci
- Original run: March 2011 – July 2011
- Anime television series
- Directed by: Tatsuyuki Nagai
- Produced by: Shunsuke Saito; Noriko Ozaki
- Written by: Mari Okada
- Music by: Remedios
- Studio: A-1 Pictures
- Licensed by: AUS: Hanabee; BI: MVM Films; NA: Aniplex of America; SEA: Muse Communication
- Original network: Fuji TV (Noitamina)
- Original run: April 14, 2011 – June 23, 2011
- Episodes: 11
- Manga
- Written by: Mari Okada
- Illustrated by: Mitsu Izumi
- Published by: Shueisha
- Magazine: Jump Square
- Original run: April 4, 2012 – April 4, 2013
- Volumes: 3
- Video game
- Developer: Guyzware
- Publisher: 5pb.
- Genre: Visual novel
- Platform: PlayStation Portable
- Released: JP: August 30, 2012
- Anime film
- Directed by: Tatsuyuki Nagai
- Produced by: Shunsuke Saito; Noriko Ozaki
- Written by: Mari Okada
- Music by: Remedios
- Studio: A-1 Pictures
- Licensed by: NA: Aniplex of America; SEA: Muse Communication
- Released: August 31, 2013
- Runtime: 99 minutes
- Live-action television film
- Directed by: Masaki Nishiura
- Written by: Yoshihiro Izumi
- Studio: FCC
- Original network: FNS (Fuji TV)
- Released: September 21, 2015
- Runtime: 113 minutes
- icon

Anohana: The Flower We Saw That Day (Japanese: あの日見た花の名前を僕達はまだ知らない。, Hepburn: Ano Hi Mita Hana no Namae o Bokutachi wa Mada Shiranai; "We Still Don't Know the Name of the Flower We Saw That Day") is a Japanese anime television series created by Super Peace Busters (超平和バスターズ, Chō Heiwa Basutāzu), an artist collective consisting of director Tatsuyuki Nagai, screenwriter Mari Okada, and character designer Masayoshi Tanaka. The anime was produced by A-1 Pictures and aired in Fuji TV's Noitamina block between April and June 2011. It has been licensed in North America by Aniplex of America.

A novelization by Okada was serialized in Media Factory's Da Vinci magazine from March to July 2011. A manga adaptation illustrated by Mitsu Izumi was serialized in Shueisha's Jump Square magazine from April 2012 to April 2013. A visual novel adaptation for the PlayStation Portable was released by 5pb. in August 2012. An anime film sequel that takes place one year after the series was released in Japanese theaters in August 2013. A live action television film adaptation premiered in September 2015 on Fuji TV. A stage reading that takes place ten years after the main story, written by Okada, was performed by the original cast for the series' tenth anniversary in Chichibu, Saitama on August 28, 2021; it was also released on CD, included in the "10 Years After" Blu-ray box set, on December 29 of that same year.

== Plot ==
In Chichibu, Saitama, a group of six fifth-grade-age childhood friends drift apart after one of them, Meiko "Menma" Honma, dies in an accident. Five years after the incident, the leader of the group, Jinta Yadomi, has withdrawn from society, does not attend high school, and lives as a recluse. One summer day, the ghost of an older-looking Menma appears beside him and asks to have a wish granted, reasoning that she cannot pass on into the afterlife until it is fulfilled. At first, he only tries to help her minimally because he thinks he is hallucinating. But since Menma does not remember what her wish is, Jinta gathers his estranged friends together once again, believing that they are the key to solving this problem. All of the group joins him, though most of them do so reluctantly. However, things grow increasingly complicated when his friends accuse him of not being able to get over Menma's death, as they cannot see nor hear her and believe Jinta is hallucinating. Menma shows her presence to the group in order to prove that she is indeed real. All the group members eventually wish to shoulder the blame for Menma's death and long-hidden feelings among the group are rekindled. The group struggles as they grow from trying to help Menma move on and help each other move on as well.

== Characters ==
Jinta "Jintan" Yadomi (宿海 仁太, Yadomi Jinta)
Voiced by: Mutsumi Tamura (child), Miyu Irino (teen) (Japanese); Tara Sands (child), Griffin Burns (teen) (English)
Portrayed by: Nijirō Murakami, Ryoka Minamide (child)
Jinta Yadomi, the former leader of the childhood Super Peace Busters group, transforms from an outgoing boy into a reclusive hikikomori after the deaths of his friend Meiko and mother. His childhood crush on Meiko and refusal to admit it contributed to her accidental demise. Years later, when Meiko's ghost appears, he initially dismisses her as a hallucination. Her presence ultimately helps him reconnect with friends and overcome his isolation. As an adult, he co-founds a company with friend Tetsudo and develops a romantic relationship with Naruko.
Meiko "Menma" Honma (本間 芽衣子, Honma Meiko)
Voiced by: Ai Kayano (Japanese); Xanthe Huynh (English)
Portrayed by: Minami Hamabe, Kanon Tani (child)
Meiko "Menma" Honma is the ghost of a cheerful Russian-Japanese girl who died as a child. Years later, she reappears wearing the same dress from her accident, always barefoot, visible only to her childhood friend Jinta. Though deceased, she interacts physically with the world—opening doors, cooking meals, and playing games. Others sense her presence through faint scents or sudden chills. The selfless spirit harbors no resentment about her death, instead wishing to be reincarnated to reunite with her friends. She holds special affection for Jinta, eventually revealing her childhood dream of becoming his bride. Later hints suggest her possible reincarnation, including a dream where she claims to have returned as potato liquor—a moment her friends accept as characteristic of her playful nature.
Naruko "Anaru" Anjo (安城 鳴子, Anjō Naruko)
Voiced by: Haruka Tomatsu (Japanese); Erica Lindbeck (English)
Portrayed by: Airi Matsui, Chinami Yoshioka (child)
Naruko Anjo, a childhood member of the Super Peace Busters, maintains a complex relationship with Jinta. Outwardly cold yet secretly concerned, she delivers homework to his home while criticizing his reclusive lifestyle. Though easily swayed by peers, she harbors deep guilt over her indirect role in Meiko's death and lingering jealousy of Jinta's attachment to Meiko's memory. Atsumu observes they both remain trapped by unrequited feelings—hers for Jinta, his for Meiko. As she matures, Naruko grows more independent, wearing her hair down and preparing to confess her feelings. A decade later, working as a dental hygienist, she navigates a tentative relationship with Jinta. His sudden marriage proposal surprises her, though she doesn't reject the idea, signaling their evolving connection beyond childhood bonds.
Atsumu "Yukiatsu" Matsuyuki (松雪 集, Matsuyuki Atsumu)
Voiced by: Asami Seto (child), Takahiro Sakurai (teen) (Japanese); Michelle Ruff (child), Ray Chase (teen) (English)
Portrayed by: Jun Shison, Ruiki Sato (child)
Atsumu Matsuyuki, a popular high school student, hides deep trauma over Meiko's death. Secretly dressing as her ghost, he blames himself for her accident after confessing his feelings that fateful day. His resentment toward Jinta stems from both jealousy and guilt. Though outwardly successful, he remains emotionally stunted—later abandoning a Tokyo banking career to return home. Even as an adult, he struggles to move on, seeking to rekindle a past relationship with Chiriko while still haunted by childhood regrets.
Chiriko "Tsuruko" Tsurumi (鶴見 知利子, Tsurumi Chiriko)
Voiced by: Saori Hayami (Japanese); Erica Mendez (English)
Portrayed by: Marie Iitoyo, Karen Ichihara (child)
Chiriko Tsurumi, the Super Peace Busters' most analytical member, maintains a fraught closeness with Atsumu after Meiko's death. Though secretly wearing the hairpin he discarded post-rejection, she openly criticizes his crossdressing coping mechanism—even sketching it clinically. Her unrequited love coexists with guilt over indirectly causing Meiko's accident. While skeptical of the ghost's return, she assists Meiko's passing both from genuine care and to free Atsumu from the past. As a web designer living outside Chichibu, her adult self retains short hair and artistic habits. A failed romance with Atsumu gives way to enduring friendship, proving her pragmatic acceptance that some loves remain unresolved.
Tetsudo "Poppo" Hisakawa (久川 鉄道, Hisakawa Tetsudo)
Voiced by: Aki Toyosaki (child), Takayuki Kondō (teen) (Japanese); Abby Trott (child), Kaiji Tang (teen) (English)
Portrayed by: Yuta Takahata, Santa Takahashi (child)
Tetsudō Hisakawa, the most easygoing Super Peace Busters member, travels the world working odd jobs while secretly haunted by witnessing Meiko's accident. Despite his carefree exterior, he actively reunites the group and supports Meiko's spirit. Years later, he co-founds an import business with Jinta and starts a family, finally finding stability.

== Media ==
=== Printed media ===
A novel adaptation of the anime written by Mari Okada was serialized in Media Factory's Da Vinci magazine between the March and July 2011 issues. The first of two volumes were published under Media Factory's MF Bunko Da Vinci imprint on July 25, 2011. A manga adaptation illustrated by Mitsu Izumi began serialization in Shueisha's Jump Square magazine on April 4, 2012, and ended on April 4, 2013, Its chapters were collected in three tankōbon volumes, released from September 4, 2012, to May 2, 2013.

=== Anime ===
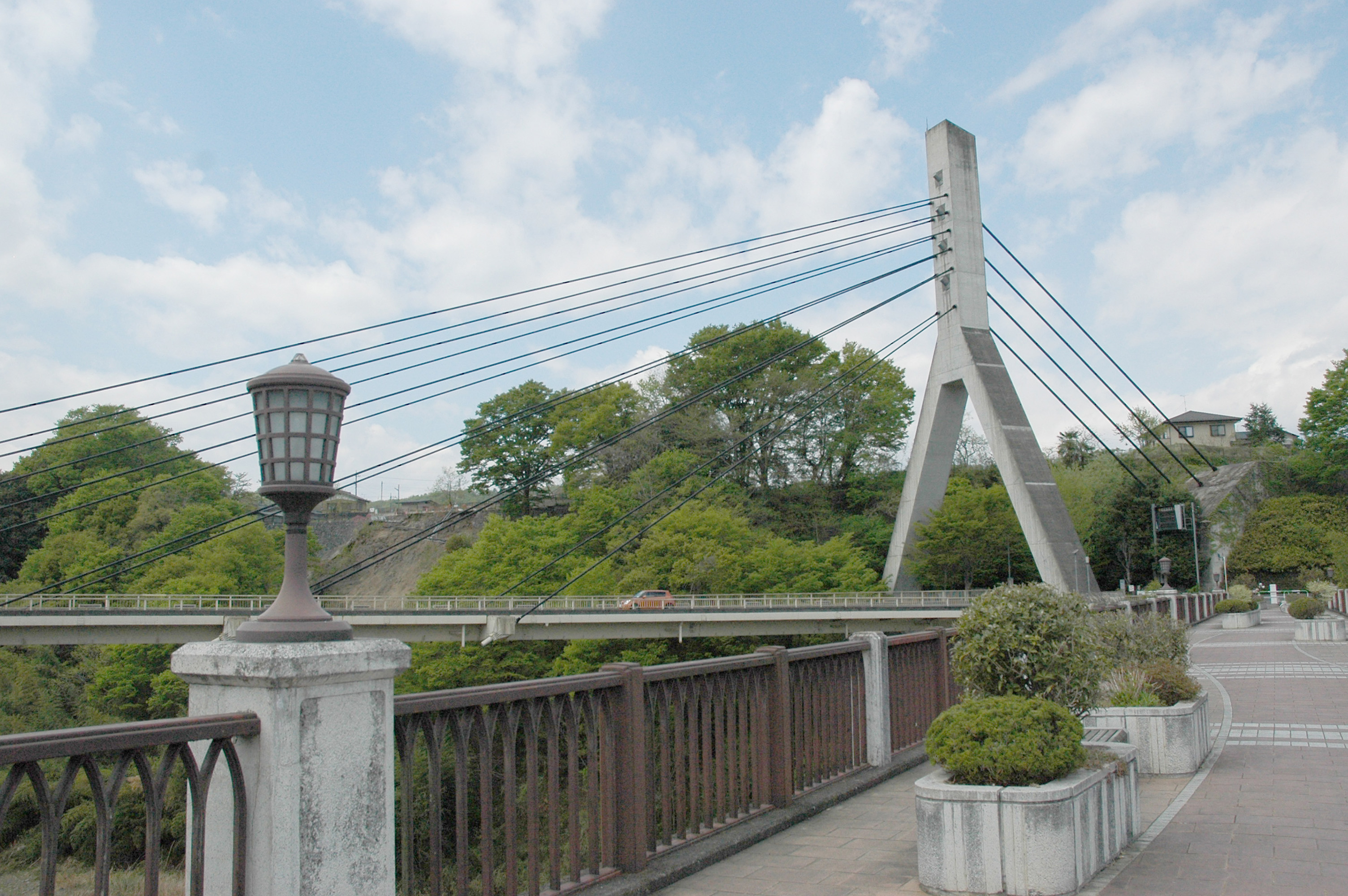
Chichibu Bridge is featured in the anime.

The 11-episode Anohana anime television series directed by Tatsuyuki Nagai and produced by A-1 Pictures aired in Japan between April 14 and June 23, 2011, on Fuji TV's Noitamina programming block. The screenplay was written by Mari Okada, and chief animator Masayoshi Tanaka also designed the characters. The sound director is Jin Aketagawa of Magic Capsule, and the anime's music was produced by Remedios. The series was simulcast by Crunchyroll and was licensed by NIS America in North America with English subtitles, and released the anime on DVD and Blu-ray Disc in a two-disc compilation on July 3, 2012. Aniplex of America announced they would re-release the series with an English dub at their Sakura-Con panel on April 16, 2017, and it was released on October 31, 2017. It has been licensed by Muse Communication in Southeast Asia.

The series uses two pieces of theme music. The opening theme is "Aoi Shiori" (青い栞, Blue Bookmark) by Galileo Galilei, and the ending theme is "Secret Base (Kimi ga Kureta Mono) (10 years after Ver.)" (Secret Base ～君がくれたもの～ (10 years after Ver.)), a cover of the 2001 single by Zone, performed by Ai Kayano, Haruka Tomatsu, and Saori Hayami. The anime's original soundtrack was released on December 21, 2011.

An anime film, subtitled Menma e no Tegami (めんまへの手紙, A Letter to Menma), was released in Japanese theaters on August 31, 2013. The film is set during school summer break a year after the anime. The surviving Super Peace Busters have agreed to each write a letter to Menma, then meet at the secret base to send those letters. Chiriko Tsurumi wrote her letter first and calls to remind and encourage the others. During the film there are many memory bits of the joys and trauma they went through and flashbacks, many to the events in the anime series, some new or expanding on what was previously shown. Appearing one year afterwards are the five surviving Super Peace Busters, Menma's brother Satoshi, her mother Irene, and the owner of the game store where Jinta works. Jinta's father is shown in a flashback set after the anime series. The film's theme song is "Circle Game" (サークルゲーム) by Galileo Galilei. The song is also used for an alternate opening for the anime's rerun on Noitamina starting in July 2013. Aniplex of America released the film in standard edition DVD and Blu-ray Disc (BD) sets and a limited edition BD/DVD combo pack on July 15, 2014. Muse Communication holds the license to the film in Southeast Asia.

No.	Title	Directed by	Original release date
1	"Super Peace Busters" "Chō Heiwa Basutāzu" (Japanese: 超平和バスターズ)	Tatsuyuki Nagai	April 14, 2011
Jinta "Jintan" Yadomi is being pestered by a girl named Meiko "Menma" Honma, who only he can see. Menma says she has a wish she wants him to fulfill, but she can't remember what it was. Soon, she recalls that the dream was to have their friends all together again. One of the former friends, Naruko "Anaru" Anjo, drops by Jinta's house to drop off some homework, but is on bad terms with him. It is revealed that Jintan has poor school attendance. As Menma pesters Jinta to go after Naruko and talk to her, they both go into the city where they run into two other former friends, Chiriko "Tsuruko" Tsurumi and Atsumu "Yukiatsu" Matsuyuki, the latter of which reacts harshly when Jinta accidentally drops Menma's name. Frustrated, Jintan runs off and leaves Menma behind. Jinta begins to recall the past when he, Menma, and their other friends were part of a group known as the Super Peace Busters that hung out together when they were children. One day, Jinta accidentally hurt Meiko's feelings when asked if he liked her. He decided to apologize, but she died in an accident before he could. Back in the present, Menma visits her family's house. Jinta decides to search for Menma so he could finally apologize and he checks out their old secret fort. Here, he runs into the last of the six old friends, Tetsudo "Poppo" Hisakawa.
2	"Menma the Hero" "Yūsha Menma" (Japanese: ゆうしゃめんま)	Fumie Muroi	April 21, 2011
When Jinta tells Tetsudo about his visions of Menma, he instantly believes him. Meanwhile, Anaru ends up encountering Chiriko, though she soon breaks into tears when Menma is mentioned. It is revealed that Naruko blames herself for the circumstances leading to Menma's death. Tetsudo suggests that the wish Menma might want granted was to have a rare monster from a Nokémon video game, which Jinta buys from the game shop Anaru works at. He spends the night playing it before Menma comes back. The next day, Tetsudo runs into Atsumu and mentions what Jinta told him about Menma. He later goes around Jinta's house and mentions that they would have to trade with another Nokémon game to get the rare monster. As a result, they visit Anaru, who agrees to help them on the condition that Jinta starts attending school again. During this visit, Menma is happy to realize that Anaru still has an abundance of video games and manga, just like when they were kids. After spending the night gaming, they manage to get the rare monster, though it turns out not to be Menma's wish. Nevertheless, they are positive that somehow Menma's wish will be found out and fulfilled. Jinta, however, has found his own wish: to apologize to Menma because of the incident.
3	"Menma Search Party" "Menma o Sagasou no Kai" (Japanese: めんまを探そうの会)	Ai Yoshimura	April 28, 2011
After being pestered by Menma, Jinta heads towards school, but changes his mind when faced with insults from Naruko's friends. He goes to see Tetsudo, who claims he saw Menma the previous night. Jinta arrives home where Menma had attempted to make muffins that Jinta's late mother used to make, though she claims she didn't go around Tetsudo's place the previous night. The next day, Tetsudo decides to hold a 'Menma Search Party' barbecue event for the others. When Atsumu eventually appears, he also claims to have seen Menma.
4	"The White Dress with a Ribbon" "Shiro no, Ribon no Wanpīsu" (Japanese: 白の、リボンのワンピース)	Kenichi Imaizumi	May 5, 2011
After Jinta keeps her from slipping in the same spot Menma died in, Naruko hints that he can probably see Menma because he loved her. Atsumu's claims of what Menma had told him differ from the thoughts of the Menma Jinta can see, so Jinta brings out the muffins that Menma made earlier, hoping to convey Menma's true feelings. The next day, Jinta is visited by Chiriko, who asks him to confront Atsumu about his 'fake Menma'. As the gang gets together that night, they appear to spot a Menma running around in the woods, which turns out to be Atsumu wearing a white sundress.
5	"Tunnel" "Tonneru" (Japanese: トンネル)	Takayuki Tanaka	May 12, 2011
Atsumu blames himself for Menma's death, and Menma has Jinta tell him things that only she and Atsumu know of. Later, Chiriko explains how she caught onto his obsession with Menma. Atsumu recalls that fateful day years ago, when he confessed to Menma shortly after Jinta ran off, only to be rejected. Meanwhile, Jinta wonders why he hasn't been so focused on fulfilling Menma's wish lately. The next day, Naruko goes to a karaoke bar with her friends, when a boy forces her to a love hotel. She is saved by the timely arrival of Atsumu. On the train ride home, Atsumu asks Naruko about her feelings for Jinta. She is conflicted whether or not she 'likes' him. Meanwhile, Tetsudo tells Jinta and Menma (knowing Menma is there, though he can't see her) his theory that Menma is around because she couldn't ascend to Heaven, but this just makes her upset.
6	"Forget It, Don't Forget" "Wasurete Wasurenaide" (Japanese: わすれてわすれないで)	Takahiro Harada	May 19, 2011
Trying to figure out Menma's wish, Jinta decides to make his long-delayed return to school. However, his return is overshadowed over rumours about Naruko having been spotted at a love hotel. As Naruko becomes noticeably upset by all the nasty gossip surrounding her, Jinta stands up for her, and both leave class right away. With Naruko troubled about her parents hearing about the news, she decides to stay at the secret base, and stops attending school. Hoping to find any clues to what Menma's wish might be, Jinta, Naruko and Tetsudo visit Menma's house to pay their respects, where they meet her mother, who gives them Menma's diary, which they agree to read the next day. When Jinta mentions the visit to Menma, she becomes upset as she wanted her mother to forget about her so that she wouldn't be sad. Jinta in turn yells at her for never thinking of herself and runs off.
7	"The Real Wish" "Honto no Onegai" (Japanese: ほんとのお願い)	Tomohiko Itō	May 26, 2011
Jinta, Naruko and Tetsudo look inside Menma's diary, where they find an entry about how the group wanted to make a firework to send a letter to God to help Jinta's mother, though modern laws prevent them from making one themselves. As Chiriko asks Atsumu why he didn't bring up that Menma called the others on that fateful day, he points out it was something that was to be kept secret from Jinta. Jinta's father points him towards a friend of his that can make fireworks, but it's revealed one would cost 200,000 yen to make. Jinta takes up a part time job in order to help raise the money needed to buy a firework, working at Naruko's game store part of the day and Tetsudo's construction site later the same day, sometimes swapping shifts to get better pay. Naruko and Tetsudo also work hard and contribute to the fireworks fund. (In the manga Chiriko and Atsumu sell some items on eBay and donate money. Their school forbids part-time work.) When Menma hears that Jinta is working, instead of going to school, she rushes to the secret base where she overhears Naruko talking about the firework and then sees the work Jinta is doing for her. However, the next day the gang learn that the firework maker is no longer able to make a firework for them, under orders from Honma. They jump to the conclusion that Menma's father had forbid it.
8	"I Wonder"	Ai Yoshimura	June 2, 2011
Jinta and the others visit Menma's mother to ask about the fireworks, but she refuses, showing anger and sadness towards them about how they were able to grow up while Menma died years ago. Afterwards, Atsumu accuses Jinta of forcing his pain onto others, so Jinta decides to try to solve Menma's wish himself. As Jinta's multiple jobs begin to have a negative effect on his health, Naruko urges him to stop. She reveals that she felt happy when Jinta badmouthed Menma back then because she had a crush on him, later saying that if he were to grant Menma's wish, she would just disappear again. The next day, as Jinta goes with his father to visit his mother's grave, the others receive silent calls from Jinta's house phone. Jinta is later visited by Menma's brother, Satoshi, who tells him about his memories of Menma. As the others confront Jinta at the secret base about the silent calls they had received, Menma arrives and makes her presence known by writing a brand new entry in her diary and dropping it on the floor.
9	"Menma and Company" "Minna to Menma" (Japanese: みんなとめんま)	Kenichi Imaizumi	June 9, 2011
The episode starts at Jinta's house, where they witness Menma's presence first hand by moving objects, which appear to be floating on their own to them. Afterwards, Atsumu says they should continue their efforts, going with Chiriko the next day to beg Menma's father for permission to have the fireworks made. As work on the fireworks begins, Atsumu becomes frustrated that only Jinta can see Menma, while Naruko is upset that she can't compare to Menma. As Atsumu tries to cheer Naruko up, Chiriko overhears Atsumu mention that he would go out with Naruko. After spending the evening with Tetsudo, Menma spots a carp in the river and goes to investigate, which scares Jinta when he spots her near the river, letting out that he wants her to stay forever.
10	"Fireworks" "Hanabi" (Japanese: 花火)	Toshiya Shinohara	June 16, 2011
Menma begins to fade, her hands becoming semi-transparent. As the gang holds a party in Menma's honor in preparation for next day's fireworks, Chiriko becomes cold towards Atsumu, mentioning that on that day, Menma apparently wanted to do something for Jinta. On the night of the party, Atsumu has Naruko and Tetsudo pressure Jinta into admitting his true feelings for Menma in front of everyone. Walking home Naruko laments his answer and her hopeless love for Jinta, and Chiriko reveals to Naruko her own hopeless love for Atsumu, more hopeless because Atsumu's second choice is Naruko. On his walk home Jinta asks Menma if she would rather stay here so that they could be together, to which Menma responds that she wants to be with all of them and she plans to go to heaven and be reincarnated. On the day of the firework launch, Satoshi comes to watch while Jinta has doubts of going through with it, as the reality of letting Menma go forever sets in. Jinta wants to stop the firework, however, he's too late. As the firework launches, Jinta suddenly hears Menma's voice: he looks behind and sees Menma admiring the fireworks.
11	"The Flower Blooming on That Summer" "Ano Natsu ni Saku Hana" (Japanese: あの夏に咲く花)	Tatsuyuki Nagai	June 23, 2011
Jinta and the others think that Menma did not pass on because their feelings were selfish. Chiriko tells them she conspired with Menma the day she died in the hopes of getting together with Atsumu, who she secretly had been in love with since childhood. Tetsudo had seen what happened to Menma on that day and felt guilty about it ever since. One by one, each of them reveal feelings of regret over their roles in Menma's death. After everyone cries, Jinta tells everyone about Menma's dream to talk with everyone, so they suggest he brings Menma to the base. However, Menma has started to disappear, because she had made a promise. Jinta's mother had accepted dying, but was concerned that Jintan was bottling up his emotions. Menma promised Jinta's mother to help Jinta learn to cry. Jinta carries Menma to the secret base, but when he gets there, he loses his ability to see her. Menma, distressed with what has happened, calls out that this is "Hide and seek." Jinta can hear this. As the gang try to find her, Menma writes some final messages to everyone. After reading the messages, they are each brought to tears. After shouting out to her, Menma calls "You found me!" and Jinta and the others are able to see and hear her, enabling them to give their final goodbyes before she disappears. Later, Jinta starts going to school with Naruko, while Atsumu and Chiriko grow closer together. As for Tetsudo, he continues working on his part-time job and also tries to study again. Jinta and his friends return to the secret base and read Menma's final message, written on the beam in the secret base, while thinking about the flower that blooms in the summer.

=== Visual novel ===
A visual novel adaptation developed by Guyzware for the PlayStation Portable was published by 5pb. on August 30, 2012.

=== Live-action drama ===
A live action Japanese television drama film adaptation premiered on Fuji TV on September 21, 2015. The theme song is a cover of "Secret Base (Kimi ga Kureta Mono)" performed by Silent Siren.

== Reception ==
In a quarterly financial report, Fuji Media Holdings singles out Anohana as one of their top anime properties, calling it a "big hit" and announcing that the first DVD volume sold 56,000 copies.

The film grossed US$10.2 million and was the 14th highest-grossing anime film in Japan in 2013.

Anohana has received positive critical reception and has been considered one of the best anime of the 2010s by Polygon; writer Julia Lee highlighted how "Anohana has turned the toughest people into crying puddles on the floor, not only because the entire premise is built around a tragedy, but because it's a reminder that friends grow apart and people change". Crunchyroll also included it in such a list; reviewer Daryl Harding commented that the anime "blew the tear buds of people all around the world" and that "Somehow the team can just pull at your heartstrings so much that even nearly a decade on, I still feel those tugs". Writing for Forbes, Lauren Orsini considered it to be one of the five best anime of 2011; she wrote, "Anohana is a moving journey about the ties that bind even beyond the grave that will leave you misty-eyed". Both Harding and Orsini stated the anime was a fundamental milestone in Mari Okada's career.

== See also ==
- The Anthem of the Heart
