= Awase =

Awase may refer to:

- Awase, a tidal flat in Misato-son, Okinawa City
  - Awase Airfield, a WWII airfield in Okinawa
  - Awase Housing Area, US Forces residential area and former site of Kubasaki High School, Okinawa
- Awase (album), a 2018 album by Nik Bärtsch's Ronin

== See also ==
- E-awase (絵合), painting contest among Japanese nobles during the Kamakura period
- Kai-awase (貝合わせ), Japanese game with shells
- Uta-awase (歌合せ), Japanese poetry contest
