= Karuta =

Japanese playing cards

- かるた
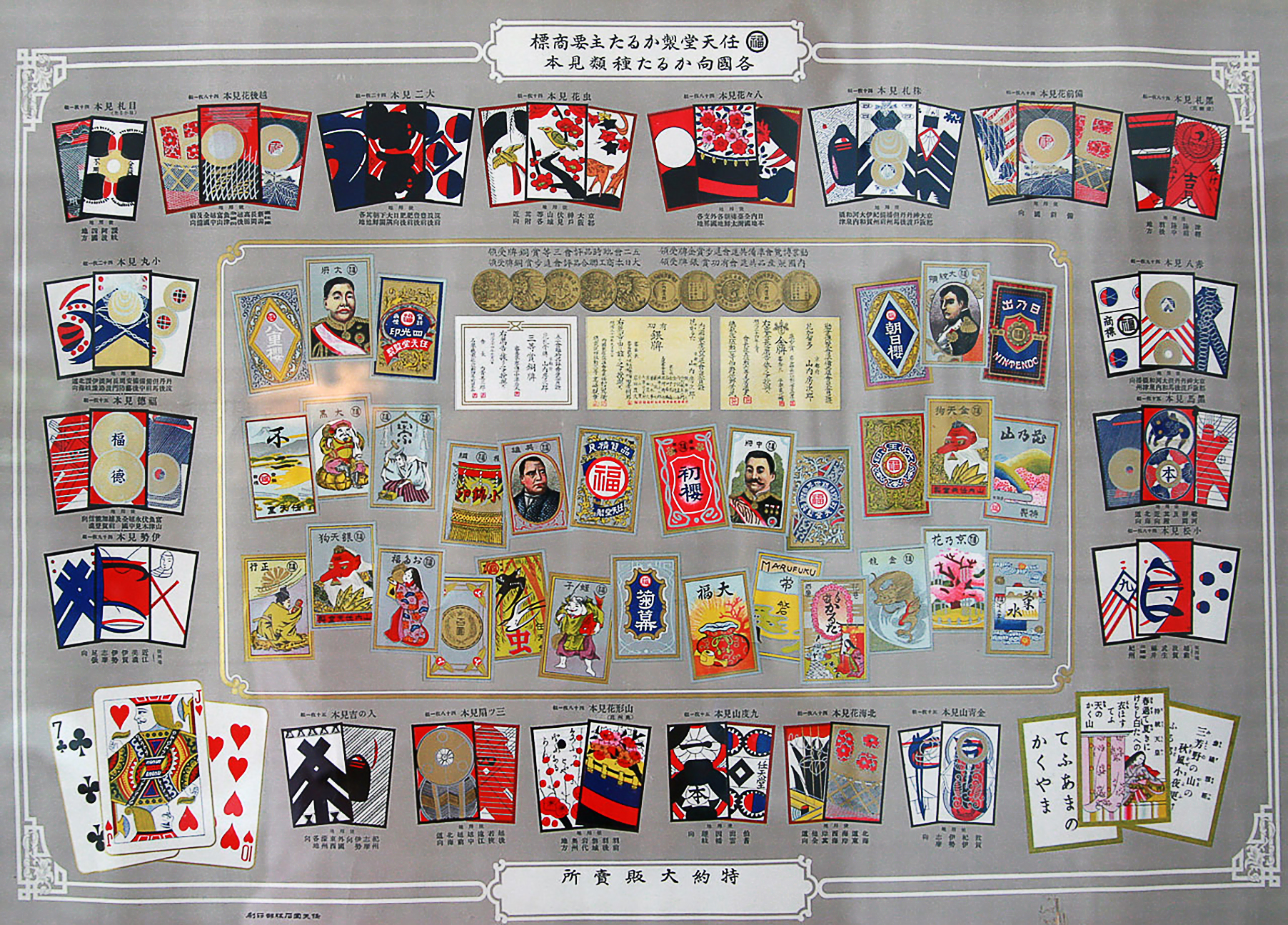
- Late Meiji period (c. 1890) advertisement by Nintendo
- Origin: Portuguese-suited cards; E-awase
- Named variant: Komatsufuda; Unsun karuta; Kabufuda; Harifuda and Hikifuda; Hanafuda; Uta-garuta; Ita-karuta; Iroha karuta; Obake karuta

Related games
- Competitive karuta

Karuta (かるた; from Portuguese: carta 'card') are Japanese playing cards. Playing cards were introduced to Japan by Portuguese traders during the mid-16th century. The earliest indigenous karuta were made in the town of Miike in Chikugo Province at around the end of the 16th century. The Miike karuta Memorial Hall located in Ōmuta, Fukuoka, is the only municipal museum in Japan dedicated specifically to the history of karuta.

Karuta packs are classified into two groups, those that are descended from Portuguese-suited playing cards and those from e-awase. E-awase originally derived from kai-awase, which was played with shells but were converted to card format during the early 17th century. The basic idea of any e-awase karuta game is to be able to quickly determine which card out of an array of cards is required and then to grab the card before it is grabbed by an opponent. It is often played by children at elementary school and junior high-school level during class, as an educational exercise.

== 16th century Portuguese playing cards (Nanban karuta) ==
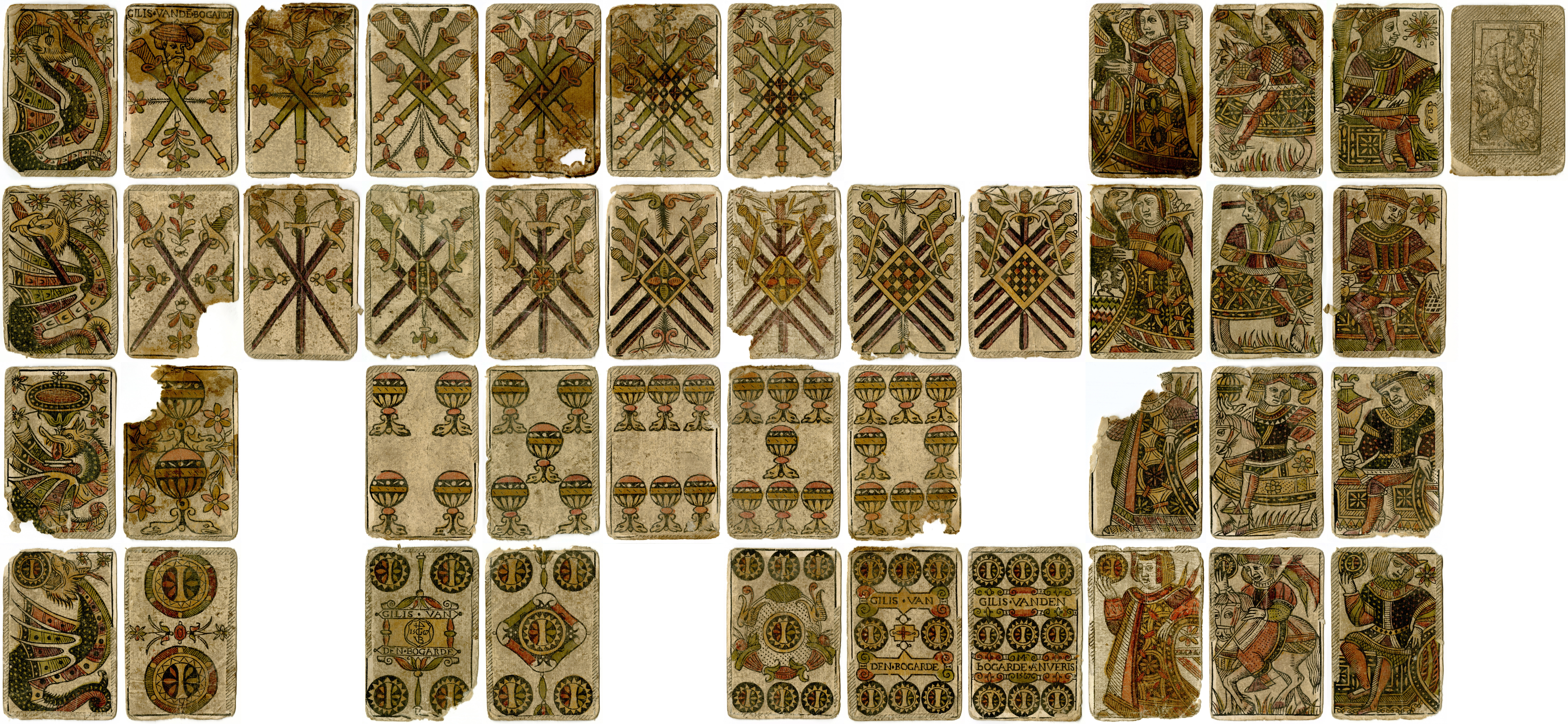
Portuguese-suited cards of the same design as those introduced to Japan by Portuguese sailors. Produced in 1567 in Antwerp. Six cards missing.

Portuguese-suited playing cards, introduced to Japan by Portuguese sailors during the 16th century nanban trade, are known in Japanese as nanban karuta (南蛮かるた; lit. "playing cards of southern barbarians"). They were used for trick-taking games. They had the four Latin suits of cups, coins, clubs, and swords, each suit having cards for 1 through 9 and three face cards (female knave/maid, knight, and king) for a total of 48 cards per card set. These features were inherited by various Japanese-made derivatives. The Portuguese cards at the time had card backs that were folded around the edges of the cards, a feature that remained standard in most karuta variants from the 17th century to the modern day.

== Portuguese-derived karuta ==
=== Tenshō karuta ===
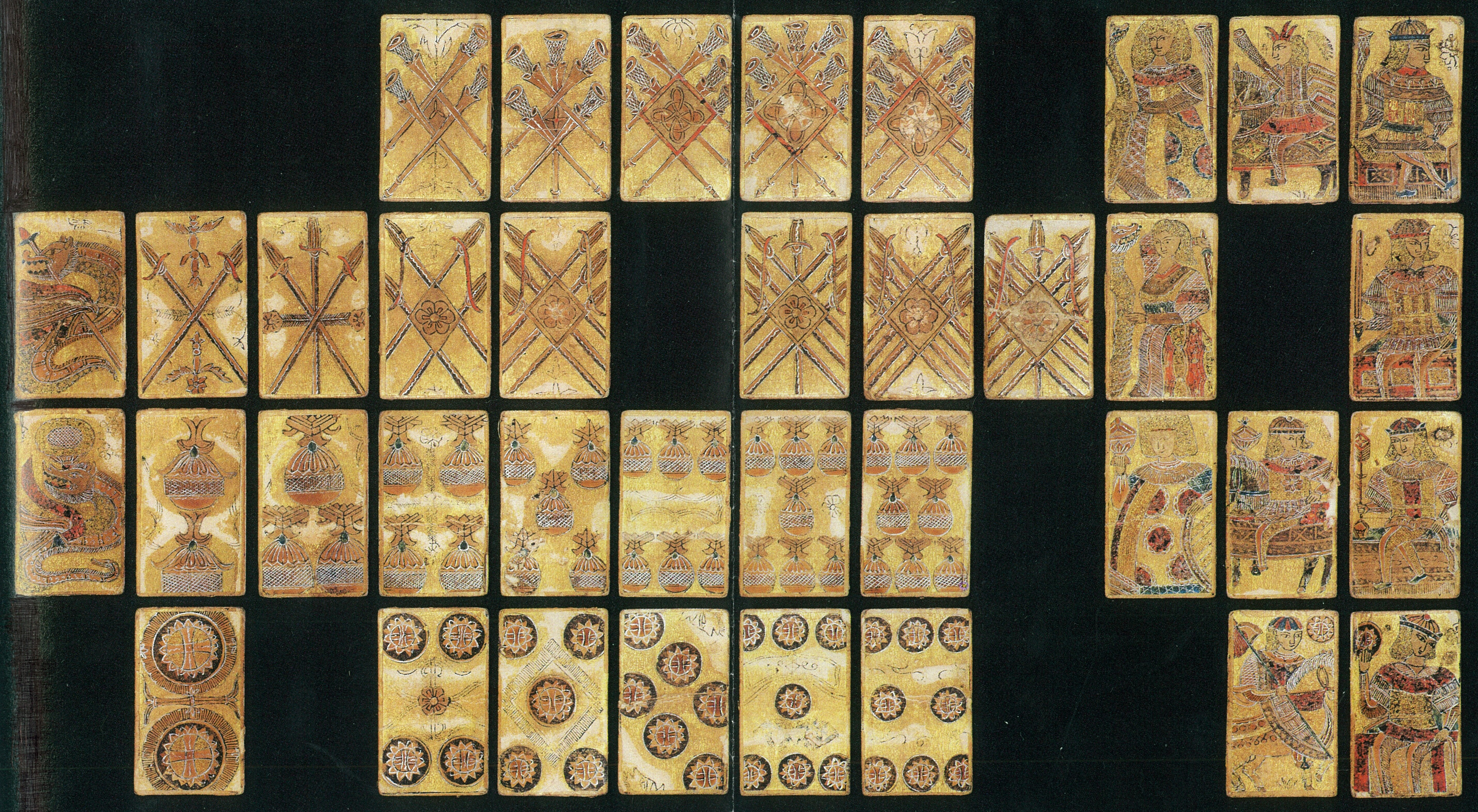
Incomplete Tenshō karuta set, made around the Genroku era (1688–1704), woodblock printing with hand-painted colors

The first kind of Japanese-made playing cards were Tenshō karuta, named after the Tenshō period (1573–1592). They were local imitations of the Portuguese playing cards, featuring the same deck structure and often very similar artwork. The first Tenshō karuta were made in the town of Miike, and are also known as Miike karuta (三池かるた).

In 1633, the Tokugawa shogunate banned Tenshō karuta, forcing Japanese manufacturers to radically redesign their cards. As a result of Japan's isolationist Sakoku policy, karuta would develop separately from the rest of the world.

=== Mekuri karuta and komatsufuda ===
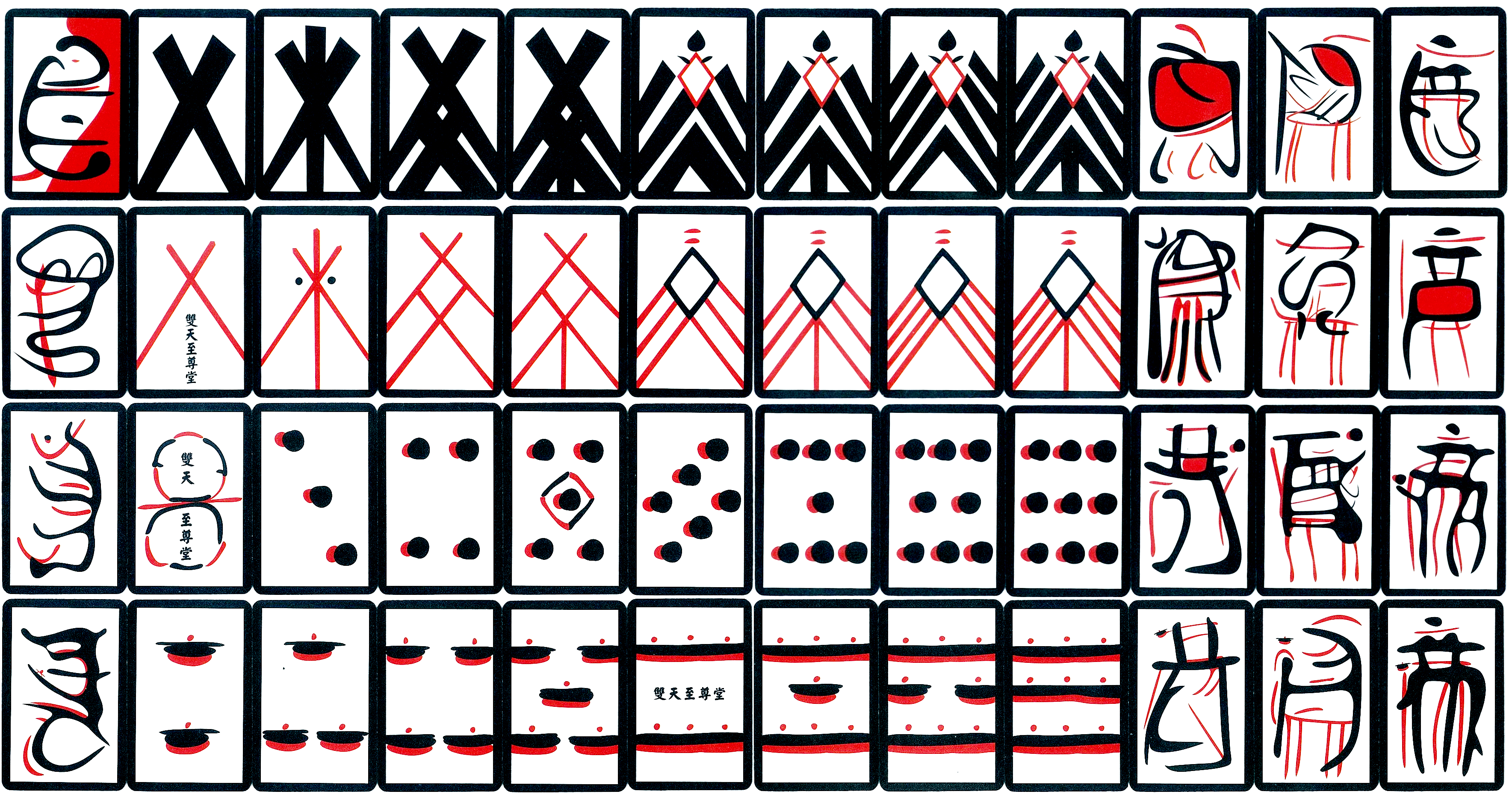
Komatsufuda set

In order to evade the proscription of Portuguese-derived cards, makers turned the cards into very abstract designs known as mekuri karuta (めくりかるた; lit. "flip (Note: Refers to the action of revealing cards, usually from the top of the deck) cards"). By the mid-20th century, all mekuri karuta fell into oblivion with the exception of Komatsufuda (小松札; lit. "small pine cards") which is used to play Kakkuri, a game similar to Poch, found in Yafune, Fukui prefecture.

=== Unsun karuta ===
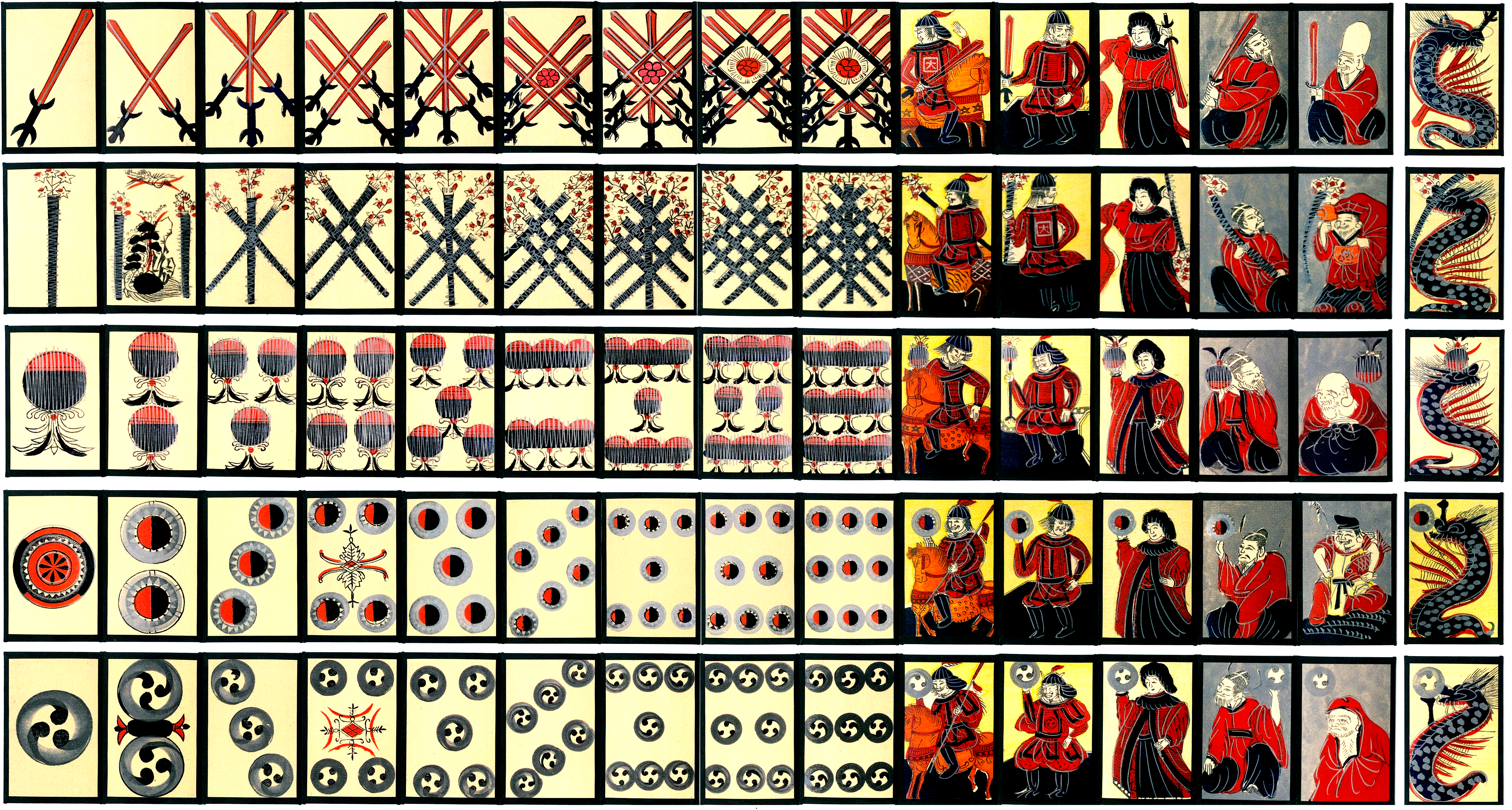
Unsun karuta set

The Unsun karuta (うんすんカルタ) deck developed in the late 17th century. It has five suits of 15 ranks each for a total of 75 cards. Six of the ranks were face cards of female knave, knight, king, "Un" (うん), "Sun" (すん), and dragon. The Portuguese deck used to have dragons on their aces; the Unsun karuta made the aces and dragons separate cards. The order of the court cards change depending on whether it is the trump suit or not just like in Ombre. The new Guru suit used circular whirls (mitsudomoe) as pips. Unsun karuta is still used in Hitoyoshi, Kumamoto, to play hachinin-meri, a game descended from Guritipau, a relative of Ombre. This game preserves some very archaic features such as inverted ranking for the pip cards in the three round suits. Inverted ranking is a feature found in Madiao, Khanhoo, Tổ tôm, Ganjifa, Tarot, Ombre, and Maw and is believed to have originated in the very earliest card games.

=== Kabufuda ===
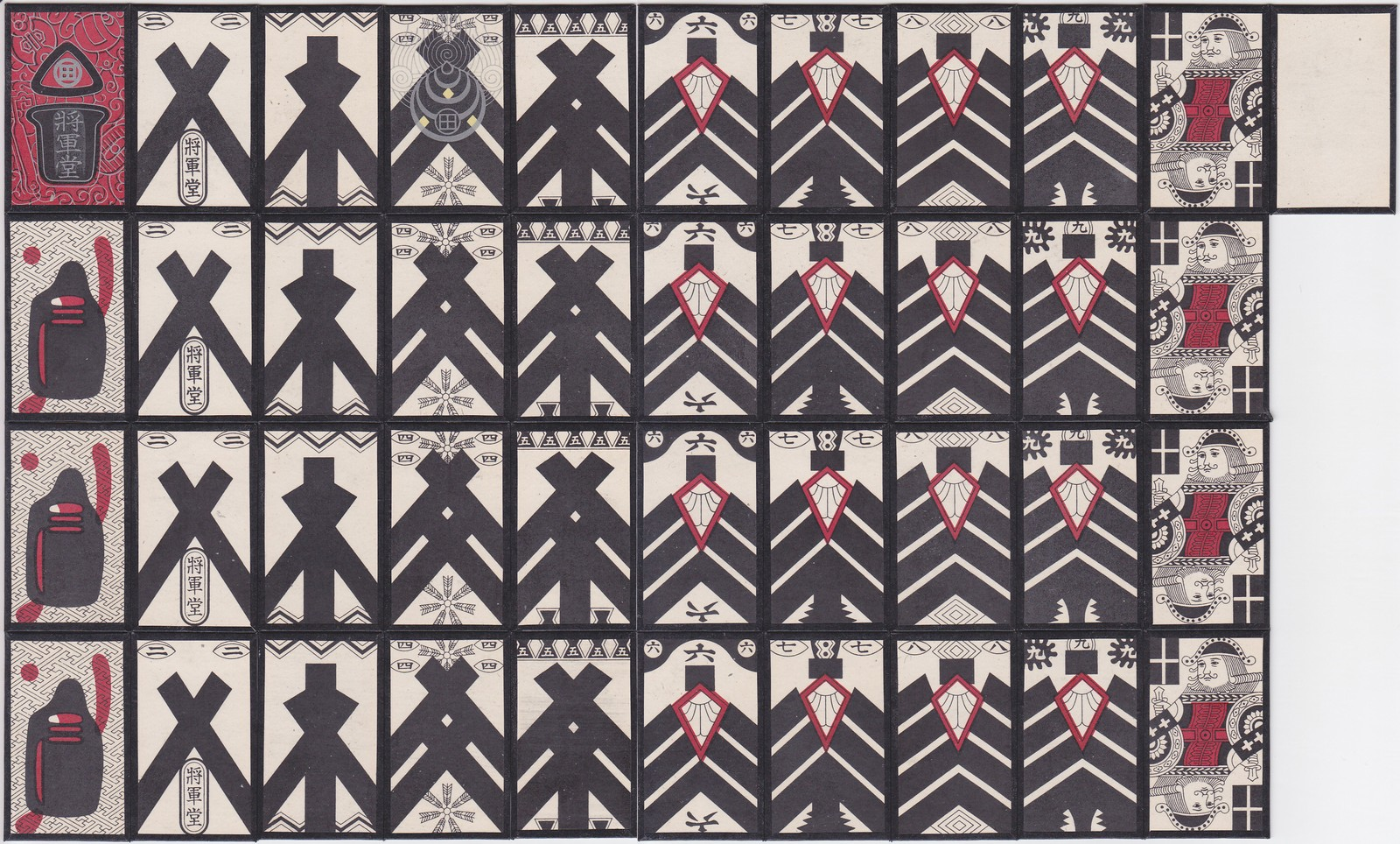
Kabufuda set

Kabufuda (株札) is another derivative of mekuri karuta but all the suits were made identical. It is used for gambling games such as Oicho-Kabu. They come in decks of 40 cards with designs representing the numbers 1 through 10. There are four cards for each number and the 10 (knave) is the only face card.

==== Iri no kichi ====
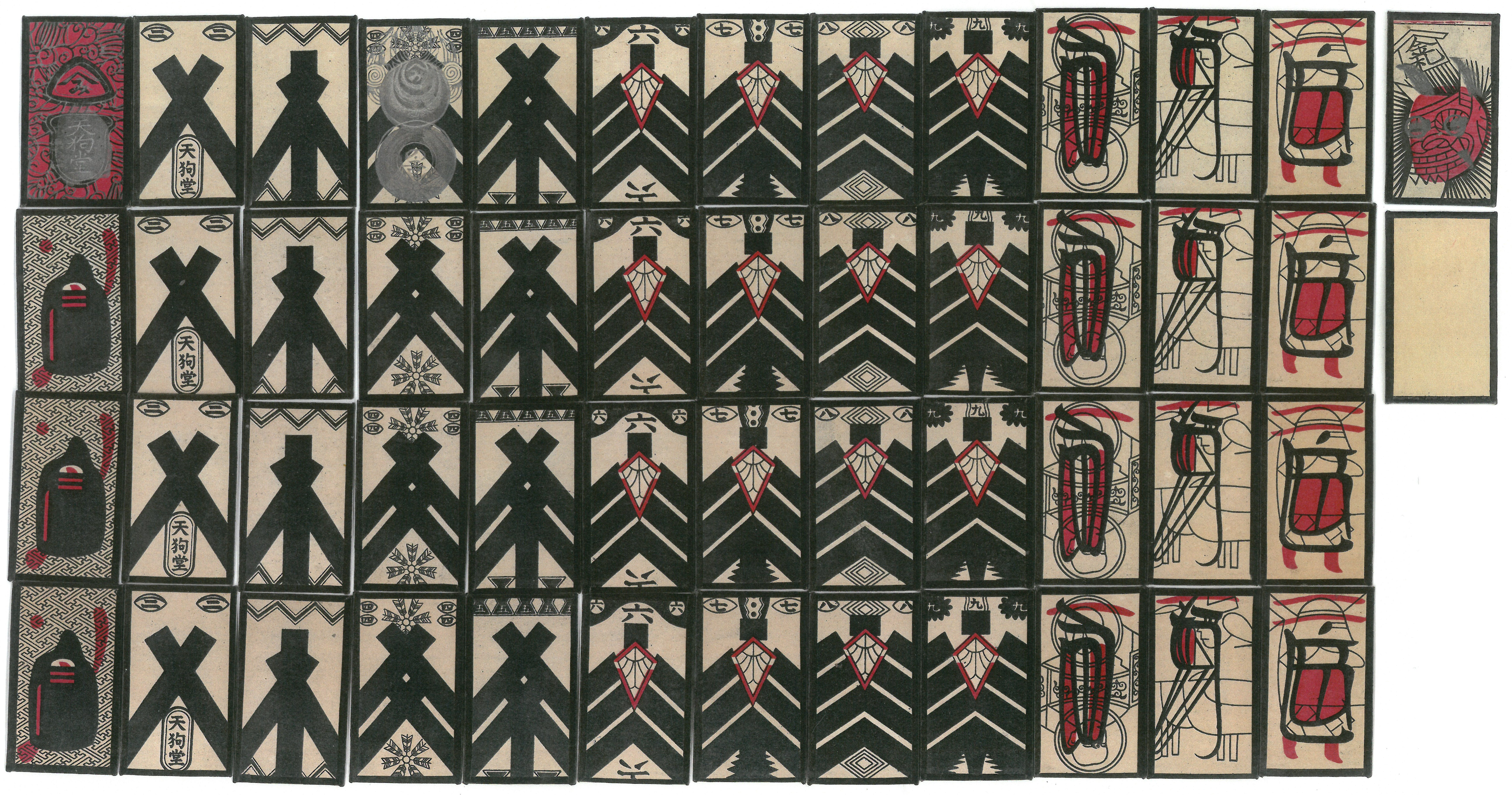
Iri no kichi set, a variant of kabufuda

Iri no kichi (入の吉) is a local variant of kabufuda where all three face cards from mekurifuda are retained, also featuring a knight and king alongside the knave, for a total of 48 cards. Many decks additionally include an oni joker card. Unlike standard kabufuda cards, modern iri no kichi cards typically remain close to the old face card designs from the Edo period.

=== Harifuda and Hikifuda ===
The gambling game of Tehonbiki can be played with either a Harifuda (張札) or Hikifuda (引札; lit. Drawn cards) set. Harifuda contains seven copies of cards numbered one to six in stylized Chinese numerals for a total of 42 cards. The 48-card Hikifuda or Mamefuda (豆札; lit. Bean (Note: Because the coins look like beans) cards) has eight copies of cards with one to six coins, similar to the coins of a mekuri karuta set. In Tehonbiki, the player tries to guess which number from 1 to 6 the dealer has selected. Some sets may include indicator cards to raise or hedge bets.

=== Hanafuda ===
January hikari

March tanzaku

September kasu

Hanafuda (花札; lit. flower cards, also called Hana karuta) are 48-card decks with flower designs originating from the 18th century. Instead of being divided by 4 suits with 12 cards each, a hanafuda deck is divided by 12 suits (months) with 4 cards each. A deck may additionally include one or more joker cards and/or a blank spare card. Hanafuda games are mostly fishing games.

== E-awase karuta ==
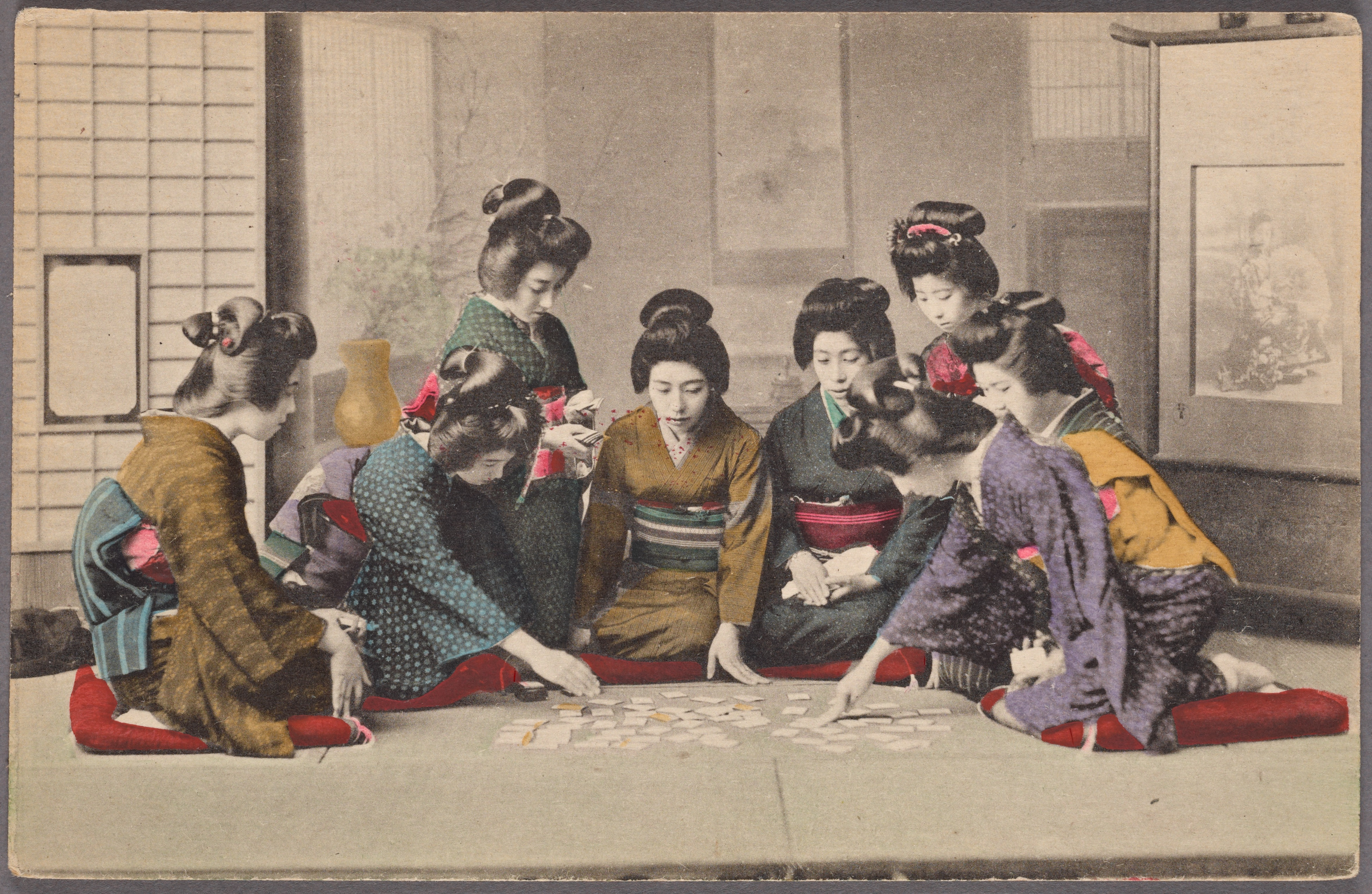
A group of women playing Uta-garuta in 1900.

=== Uta-garuta ===
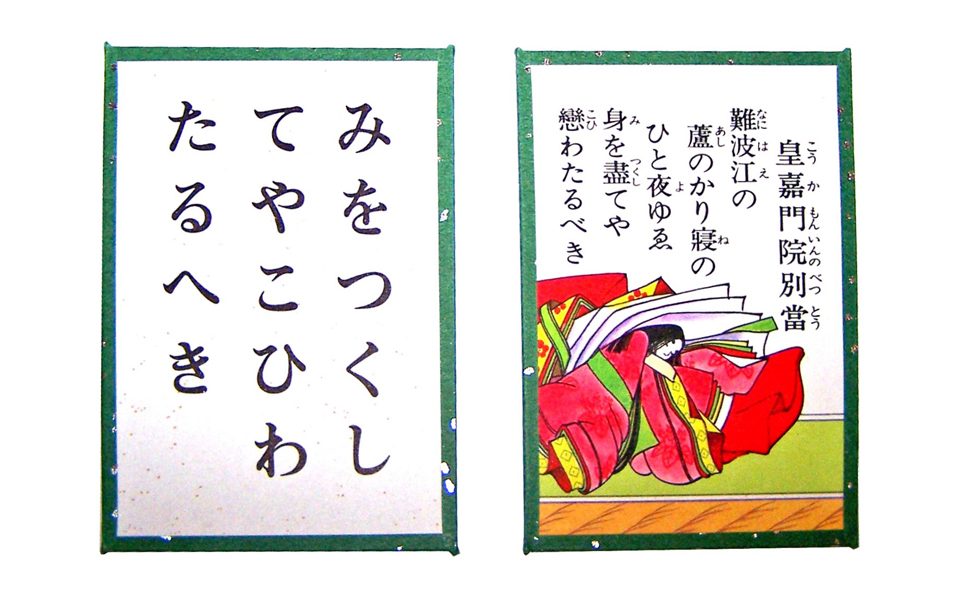
Torifuda (left) and yomifuda (right)

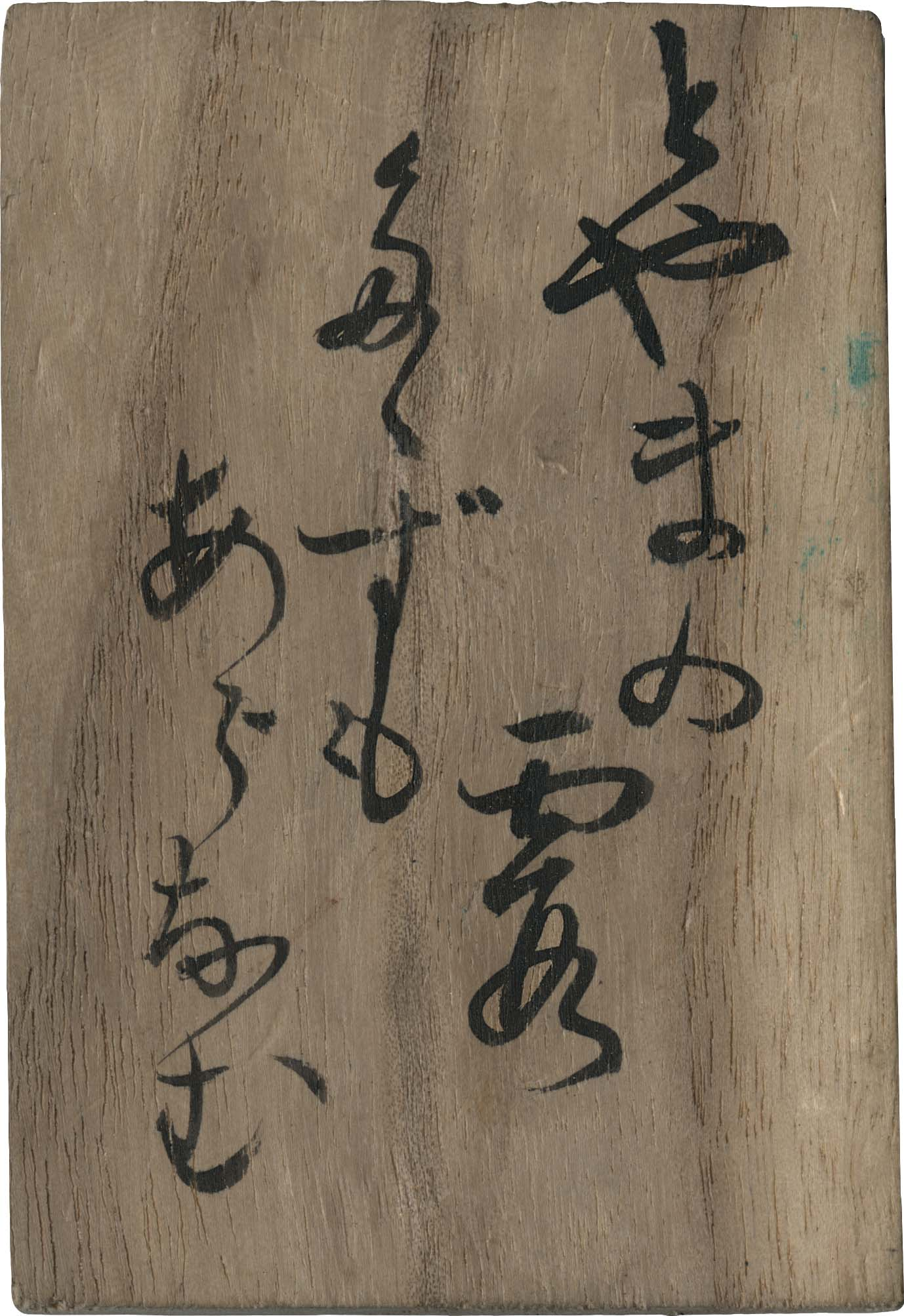
Torifuda from an Ita-karuta set

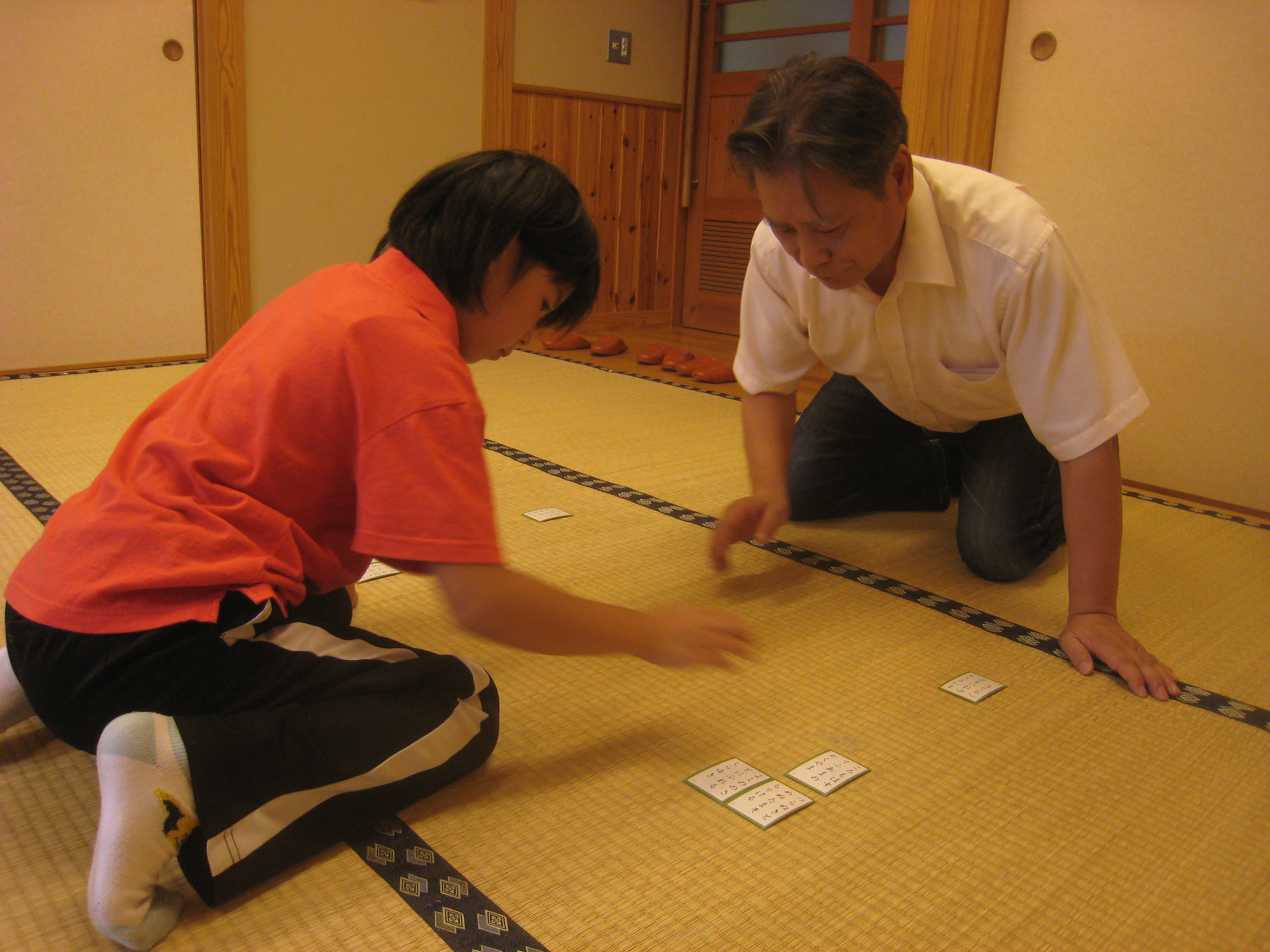
Uta-garuta practice

Uta-garuta (歌ガルタ; lit. "poetry karuta") is a card game in which 100 waka poems are written on two sets of 100 cards: one set is yomifuda (読札; lit. "reading cards"), which have the complete poem taken from the Ogura Hyakunin Isshu (小倉百人一首), and the other is torifuda (取り札; lit. "grabbing cards"), which each correspond to a yomifuda and have only the last few lines of the corresponding poem on them. One person is chosen to be the reader. As the reader reads a yomifuda, the players race to find its associated torifuda before anybody else does. This game has traditionally been played on New Year's Day since 1904. Competitive karuta has competitions on various levels with the Japan national championship tournament being held every January at Omi shrine (a Shinto shrine) in Ōtsu, Shiga since 1955.

A few non-matching games exist that use only the yomifuda. Bouzu Mekuri, is a simple game of chance originating from the Meiji period. Iro Kammuri (Color Crowns) is a 4-player partnership game that is related to Goita. In both games, the poems are irrelevant, and the only parts of the cards that matter are the appearance of the poets such as their clothing, sex, or social status.

==== Ita-karuta ====
Ita-karuta (板かるた) is a variation found in Hokkaido. The torifuda are made of wood while the yomifuda remain the same or lack illustrations of the poets. They are used to play a competitive partnership game called shimo-no ku karuta in which the last half of the poem is read.

=== Iroha karuta ===
Iroha karuta (いろはかるた) is an easier-to-understand matching game for children, similar to Uta-garuta but with 96 cards. Instead of poems, the cards represent the 47 syllables of the hiragana syllabary and adds kyō (京; "capital") for the 48th (since the syllable -n ん can never start any word or phrase). It uses the old iroha ordering for the syllables which includes two obsolete syllables, wi (ゐ) and we (ゑ). A typical torifuda features a drawing with a kana at one corner of the card. Its corresponding yomifuda features a proverb connected to the picture with the first syllable being the kana displayed on the torifuda. There are 3 standard Iroha karuta variants: Kamigata, Edo and Owari. Each variant has its own set of proverbs based on the local dialect and culture. The Kamigata or Kyoto version is the oldest but the Edo version is the most widespread, being found all over Japan. The Owari variant existed only during the latter half of the 19th-century before being supplanted by the Edo version.

==== Obake karuta ====
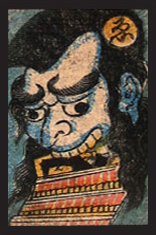
Obake karuta, c. early 19th century. This one is we (ゑ), an obsolete syllable.

Obake karuta is an obsolete variation of Iroha karuta unique to Tokyo. The cards were created in the Edo period and remained popular through the 1910s or 1920s. Each card in the deck features a hiragana syllable and a creature from Japanese mythology; in fact, obake karuta means "ghost cards" or "monster cards." Success requires knowledge of Japanese mythology and folklore as players attempt to collect cards that match clues read by a referee. The player who accumulates the most cards by the end of the game wins.

Obake karuta is an early example of the common Japanese fascination with classifying monsters and creating new ones. The game is one of the earliest attempts by Japanese companies to categorize legendary creatures, label them, define them, and subsequently market them. As such, it is a precursor to the Godzilla films of the 1950s and later. Even more closely, obake karuta resembles the Yu-Gi-Oh! or Pokémon Trading Card Game, which also involves collecting cards that represent fabulous creatures. In fact, many Pokémon were designed specifically after creatures from Japanese mythology.

== See also ==
- Competitive karuta
- Goita
- Menko
