= List of Is This a Zombie? episodes =

Cover of the first DVD/Blu-ray volume of Kore wa Zombie Desu ka? as released by Kadokawa Pictures on March 25, 2011.

Is This a Zombie? is an anime series adapted from the light novels of the same title written by Shinichi Kimura and illustrated by Kobuichi and Muririn. The series follows the adventures of Ayumu Aikawa, a zombie who is resurrected by a necromancer named Eucliwood Hellscythe after being killed by a serial killer. As he tries to make the best of his undead life, he encounters a Masō-Shōjo named Haruna and inadvertently takes her magic powers, being forced to become a Masō-Shōjo in the process. With Eucliwood, Haruna, and a vampire ninja named Seraphim living with him, Ayumu helps battle demons known as Megalos while trying to figure out the mystery behind his own death.

Produced by Studio Deen and directed by Takaomi Kanasaki, the series was broadcast on TV Saitama, Chiba TV, and Sun Television from January 10 to April 4, 2011, with later broadcasts on Gifu Broadcasting System, Inc., Kyoto Broadcasting System, Mie TV, Tokyo MX, TV Kanagawa, TVQ Kyushu Broadcasting, Nico Nico Channel, and AT-X. The last three episodes were pushed back a week due to the 2011 Tōhoku earthquake and tsunami. The series was also simulcast by Crunchyroll on their streaming site. An OVA 13th episode was released on DVD with the eighth light novel on June 10, 2011. Six DVD and Blu-ray volumes were released by Kadokawa Pictures between March 25 and August 26, 2011. The anime is licensed in North America by Funimation, who released the series in 2012.

The second season, titled Is This a Zombie? of the Dead (これはゾンビですか? オブ・ザ・デッド, Kore wa Zonbi Desu ka? Obu za Deddo), aired on April 5, 2012, on Tokyo MX, with subsequent broadcast runs on TVQ, Sun TV, Gifu Broadcasting System, Inc., Mie TV, BS11, Chiba TV, TV Kanagawa, TV Saitama and AT-X. An "episode 0" OVA was released with the tenth light novel volume on DVD on April 25, 2012, while the eleventh episode of the series was released with the sixth manga volume on October 20, 2012, on Blu-ray. This brings the total number of animated episodes to twenty-five. The English adaptation of the second season was released by Funimation on September 24, 2013. American television network Chiller began airing the show on its Anime Wednesdays block on July 15, 2015.

Four pieces of theme music are used for the series: two opening themes and two ending themes. The opening theme for the first season is "Leave-It-To-Me Tonight" (魔・カ・セ・テ Tonight, Ma-Ka-Se-Te Tonight) performed by Iori Nomizu while the ending theme is "Realize, Mr. Zombie, I am your Classmate" (気づいてゾンビさま、私はクラスメイトです, Kizuite Zonbi-sama, Watashi wa Kurasumeito Desu) by Rie Yamaguchi with Manzo. The opening theme for the second season is "Passionato" (パショナート, Pashonāto), once again performed by Iori Nomizu, while the ending theme is "I'm a Beginner at Love (T_T)" (恋のビギナーなんです（T_T）, Koi no Beginā Nan Desu (T_T)), once again performed by Rie Yamaguchi.

== Episode list ==
=== Is This a Zombie? (2011) ===
No.	Title	Original release date	English air date
1	"Yes, I'm a Magical Girl."; Transliteration: "Hai, Masō Shōjo desu" (Japanese: はい、魔装少女です)	January 11, 2011	July 15, 2015
Ayumu Aikawa is a zombie resurrected by the necromancer Eucliwood Hellscythe after being killed by an unknown assailant. A month later Eucliwood is now living with Ayumu as he continues to search for his killer. While searching a graveyard, Ayumu encounters a chainsaw-wielding "Masō-Shōjo" (Magical Garment Girl) named Haruna fighting a giant demon bear known as a Megalo, cutting through Ayumu to defeat it. Haruna attempts to erase Ayumu's memories but he inadvertently absorbs her magic, causing her magical costume to disappear, leaving her naked. Haruna decides to stay at Ayumu's house until her powers return. The next day, Ayumu is attacked by a crayfish-like Megalo. Haruna arrives but is unable to summon her magic, so Ayumu uses his zombie strength to pummel the Megalo. He discovers that he can use Haruna's magic to transform into a Masō-Shōjo, costume and all, to finish him off. After being seen by his classmates wearing Haruna's frilly costume, Ayumu is humiliated. Ayumu is informed by Haruna he must fight the Megalos in her place.
2	"No, It's a Vampire Ninja"; Transliteration: "Ie, Kyūketsu Ninja desu" (Japanese: いえ、吸血忍者です)	January 18, 2011	July 22, 2015
A week after the Megalo attack, Ayumu's dinnertime is interrupted by a vampire ninja named Seraphim who requests Eucliwoods assistance. When Eucliwood refuses Seraphim decides to replace Ayumu's role as Eucliwood's servant and challenges him to a duel which Ayumu just barely manages to win, as he is unkillable. Seraphim decides to become Ayumu's servant and live with him, though she has no intention of actually serving Ayumu, she does it to be close to Eucliwood. Ayumu recalls the night he first met Eucliwood when he came across a house being attacked by a serial killer and was struck in the back by a sword. Eucliwood happened on the scene and revived him as a zombie. The following day when Haruna gets into an argument with Ayumu and tells him to die, Eucliwood slaps her, saying death isn't to be taken lightly, prompting Haruna to apologize.
3	"Yes, Hair in Pigtails"; Transliteration: "Sō, Kamigata wa Tsuintēru ni" (Japanese: そう、髪型はツインテールに)	January 25, 2011	July 29, 2015
Ayumu goes bowling with his classmate, Orito, where they happen to run into Haruna, Eucliwood and Seraphim who have been spending the day playing games together. Ayumu tries to keep Orito from finding out the girls are living with him, but fails miserably. Afterward, Orito takes Ayumu with him to visit a girl named Kyoko who was injured in the serial killer incidents. Once alone with her, Ayumu asks Kyoko about her attacker, whose description matches that of Eucliwood.
4	"Whoa, Am I Glowing?"; Transliteration: "Cho, Ore Kagayaiteru?" (Japanese: ちょ、俺輝いてる?)	February 1, 2011	August 5, 2015
While wondering if he should suspect Eucliwood, Ayumu is attacked by a Doberman Megalo named Kerberos Wansard who, as Hells Watchdog, has come to return the resurrected Ayumu to the Underworld, but he stops when he sees Eucliwood heal Ayumu's injuries. As he leaves, he mentions the soul of someone being murdered nearby, so Ayumu follows him. Kerberos reveals that Eucliwood takes on people's pain when she heals them. After arriving at the murder scene both Ayumu and Kerberos are stabbed, Kerberos fatally, and Ayumu is unable to make out the killer's face. Ayumu talks with Eucliwood, who explains that in order to keep her powerful magic under control, she must wear magical armour, cannot express her emotions or even speak. Eucliwood cries, wondering if Ayumu hates her now that he knows this, but he insists that he will stay by her side. The next day, the city is attacked by a giant Whale Megalo, which Seraphim and Ayumu in Masō-Shōjo form defeat after Seraphim cuts its neck open and Ayumu utilizes 1000% of his Masō-Shōjo form's power to kick its head off.
5	"Yes, That's Kyoto Tofu"; Transliteration: "Ee, Kyōtōfu dosue" (Japanese: ええ、京豆腐どすえ)	February 8, 2011	August 12, 2015
Seraphim drinks blood from Haruna, kissing her as an anesthetic, while Ayumu is caught spying on them. As the girls take a bath, Ayumu takes a call from Haruna's teacher, Dai-sensei, who tells her she originally planned to send Haruna to Kyoto to get tofu, but she ended up in Tokyo instead. Ayumu then gets a call from Kyoko, who agrees to meet him to help get the tofu for Dai-sensei. When the two meet at the graveyard, Kyoko stabs Ayumu, revealing herself as both the serial killer and a Masō-Shōjo. She tries to kill Ayumu, but Haruna and Seraphim arrive to back him up, though Kyoko still has the advantage using powers similar to a Megalo's. As Ayumu transforms and joins Seraphim in fighting her, Kyoko reveals she decided to start harvesting souls in order to become immortal. Ayumu manages to grab hold of Kyoko while Seraphim stabs through him to get to her. However, she manages to survive and wounds Seraphim, forcing Eucliwood to step in.
6	"Yes, I Summon Death"; Transliteration: "Sō, Watashi wa Shi o Yobu Mono" (Japanese: そう、私は死を呼ぶもの)	February 15, 2011	August 19, 2015
Eucliwood negates all of Kyoko's attacks and manages to transform herself into a Masō-Shōjo, which brings Ayumu to the conclusion that it was Eucliwood who absorbed Haruna's magic, not him. Eucliwood uses the power of her words to kill Kyoko over and over, which also forces her to feel the pain of each death herself. However, Kyoko manages to stop this by tearing her eardrums and attacks Eucliwood with a powerful explosion that knocks her unconscious. Resolved to protect Eucliwood, Ayumu manages to negate Kyoko's magic before killing her over and over until she runs out of harvested souls, leaving her with just her own, which he decides to spare. Dai-sensei appears to take Kyoko home for re-education when another evil presence possesses Kyoko and escapes with her. Eucliwood mentions the presence was that of a zombie that she was forced to kill when it was consumed by malice.
7	"Hey, Which Middle School Are You At?"; Transliteration: "Oi, Omae Doko-chū dayo?" (Japanese: おい、お前どこ中だよ?)	February 22, 2011	August 26, 2015
Ayumu gets Haruna and Eucliwood to help him study so he doesn't have to go to summer school. Following the exam, as Ayumu searches for Haruna battling a Horse Megalo, he gets a call from Dai-sensei asking him to hold onto a package for her. When Ayumu finds Haruna he is restrained by Jellyfish Megalo but is rescued by a ramen delivery girl who defeats the Megalo with tonkotsu soup. She is revealed to be a vampire ninja named Mael Strom. When Haruna gets annoyed with Ayumu ignoring her, she pushes Ayumu onto Mael, making them accidentally kiss. Mael takes Ayumu and Seraphim to her secret base and shows them how they use a machine to rain tonkotsu soup on hordes of Megalos. Seraphim reveals to Ayumu that according to the ninja code, because they kissed Ayumu and Mael are married, regardless of whether it was an accident or not. Afterwards, Ayumu and the girls celebrate Tanabata. The next day at school, Mael Strom, who is known as Yuki Yoshida in school, declares her married status to Ayumu's entire class while Ayumu discovers that the item Dai-sensei wanted him to hold onto are x-ray glasses.
8	"Heh, I'm a Schoolyard Wife"; Transliteration: "Ehe, Gakuen-zuma desu" (Japanese: えへ、学園妻です)	March 1, 2011	September 2, 2015
Ayumu realizes that the x-ray glasses were meant for Seraphim to read secret messages. Haruna has a weird dream involving Ayumu trying to kiss her and beats him up for it. Yuki asks her friends, Taeko Hiramatsu and Kanami Mihara, for advice on how she can learn to like Ayumu, trying various things such as a homemade lunch or walking him home. Meanwhile Seraphim receives her secret message. Haruna finds Ayumu and demands a date. He ends up inviting all of the girls and the next day they all go to the mall, where Haruna becomes annoyed at Yuki's attachment to Ayumu. Later Haruna asks Ayumu to kiss her, but she settles for pummeling him instead. When they return to the others, they discover Eucliwood has gone missing.
9	"Yes, When I Strip Down, You'll be Amazed"; Transliteration: "Hai, Nugu to Sugoin desu" (Japanese: はい、脱ぐと凄いんです)	March 8, 2011	September 9, 2015
Eucliwood is confronted by the evil zombie she thought she had killed. Meanwhile, Seraphim reveals that she had received orders to kill Eucliwood since her clan believes that her magic is attracting Megalos, but Ayumu manages to convince her to abandon the mission. The zombie's threats to harm her friends causes Eucliwood's emotions to waver, summoning a large kappa doll which lands on top of Haruna and starts crushing her. Dai-sensei arrives and knocks the kappa off of Haruna, only for it to land on Yuki instead, who then becomes possessed and summons a weapon named Mysticore which goes out of control. Mysticore prepares to self-destruct, but Ayumu manages to embrace Yuki and stop the explosion. As the zombie takes his leave, Eucliwood becomes afraid she may hurt her friends and decides to leave them, leaving behind a note for Ayumu.
10	"No, That Will Explode"; Transliteration: "Ie, Sore wa Bakuhatsu Shimasu" (Japanese: いえ、それは爆発します)	March 22, 2011	September 16, 2015
Months have passed but Ayumu and the others have been unable to find Eucliwood. Having disobeyed her orders to assassinate Eucliwood, her fellow vampires order Seraphim killed. A violin is delivered to Ayumu's house which Seraphim takes an instant liking to. Later, Ayumu, Haruna and Seraphim encounter the evil zombie, named Yoruno, who attempts to kill them to lure Eucliwood back. However, they are rescued by Yuki and the other vampire ninjas, who force Yoruno to retreat. As Yuki tells Ayumu about Yoruno's location, Seraphim finds Eucliwood outside his house but Yoruno kills her by striking her in the back. Yoruno forces Eucliwood to come with him after she ensures Seraphim's survival. Ayumu and Haruna later arrive at Yoruno's house before the vampire ninjas arrive, but Yoruno places a time bomb on Haruna's head before escaping with Eucliwood. With the bomb hopping between Haruna and Yuki, Ayumu takes the bomb and leaps out the window so it can safely explode in mid air, blowing himself to pieces.
11	"Yeah, You Stay With Me!"; Transliteration: "Ā, Ore no Tokoro ni Iro!" (Japanese: ああ、オレの所にいろ!)	March 29, 2011	September 23, 2015
The girls manage to find all the pieces to put Ayumu back together, but he does not wake up. Dai-sensei appears and sends Haruna's mind into Ayumu's self-consciousness, where he is blaming himself for being too weak. Haruna manages to knock some sense into him, allowing him to wake up. Later, Ayumu and Haruna appear before Yoruno and Eucliwood, while Seraphim, who had drunk Eucliwood's blood, stands against the gateway to the demon world, using the violin to play a soothing song to fight off the hordes of Megalo coming through until the other vampire ninjas arrive to back her up. As Ayumu struggles against Yoruno, Mystletainn reacts and convinces both Ayumu and Haruna to transform into Masō-Shōjos, allowing them to overcome Yoruno's mist, though Haruna is separated from Ayumu in the process. Ayumu then proceeds to beat Yoruno up for not understanding Eucliwood's feelings. Yoruno comes to understand Ayumu and Eucliwood finally agrees to let him die. Afterward, Ayumu begs Eucliwood not to leave again and she responds with her own voice that she'll stay with him no matter what.
12	"Yes, There's Still More"; Transliteration: "Hai, Mada Tsuzukimasu" (Japanese: はい、まだ続きます)	March 30, 2011	September 30, 2015
Ayumu, Haruna, Eucliwood and Seraphim go to an indoor swimming pool where they also run into Yuki, Taeko and Kanami. Seraphim is shocked to find her fellow vampire ninja, Sarasvati (under the alias Kirara Hoshikawa), performing as a net idol. She somehow finds herself in a popularity contest against her, which Haruna decides to enter as well. Dai-sensei brings out a device that allows Eucliwood to temporarily swap her magical ability with Ayumu, allowing her to sing as well. The machine breaks down mid-performance, but Haruna uses some of her magic to let Eucliwood keep singing. However, Ayumu, still with Eucliwood's magic, speaks his mind and accidentally puts all the girls in skimpy bikinis, leading to a swift punishment.
13 (OVA)	"Yes, This Is a 1% Miracle"; Transliteration: "Ee, Kore ga Saishūkai Desu ka?" (Japanese: えぇ、これが最終回ですか？)	June 10, 2011	December 4, 2012 (DVD only)
Ayumu and the others go to a festival, which soon gets out of hand once Haruna takes control. Later, Haruna and Yuki obtain a vampire ninja recipe, which Ayumu, Seraphim and Eucliwood (all clad in unitards a la Cat's Eye) try to retrieve. Afterwards, the school partakes in an Uta-garuta tournament, with Ayumu and Orito vying for views of the girls' panties.

=== Is This a Zombie? of the Dead (2012) ===
No.	Title	Original release date
0 (OVA)	"Yes, Thank You for this Encore."; Transliteration: "Hai, Ankōru Arigatō Gozaimasu" (Japanese: はい、アンコールありがとうございます)	April 25, 2012
Carrying on from the end of the previous season, the gang continue to enjoy the swimming pool. As Ayumu tries to keep Haruna under control as she searches for Nessie, he finds himself distracted by the other girls and ends up getting punished by Sera. In the end, he learns that Haruna just wanted to play with Eucliwood. Later, the gang decide to throw a surprise party for Eucliwood's birthday. However, as Ayumu and Eucliwood return that day, they find the house turned into a demonic void by Haruna.
1	"Yes, I'm Now Making a Magical Transformation Again!"; Transliteration: "Hai, Ima Futatabi no Masō Henshin!" (Japanese: はい、今再びの魔装変身!)	April 5, 2012
Whilst resting in the nurse's office, Ayumu spots a strangely dressed girl snooping through the medicine cabinets. He spots the same girl the next day and has a pleasant conversation with her. The day afterwards, as word gets to class about a chainsaw wielding crossdresser roaming around the graveyard, Ayumu encounters a Squid Megalo. As Haruna's magic is yet to fully return and the Megalo captures Taeko, Ayumu is forced to become a Masō Shōjo in front of everyone to defeat the Megalo. However, following the fight, Mystelltain becomes too damaged for Ayumu to erase everyone's memories, leaving him at the mercy of a discriminative crowd.
2	"Aah, Farewell to Me"; Transliteration: "Ā, Sayōnara Ore" (Japanese: 嗚呼、さようなら俺)	April 12, 2012
As Ayumu's stunt as a Masō Shōjo makes him an overnight celebrity, he decides to go on a hiking trip with Yuki to escape from it all, with the others deciding to tag along. As Yuki feels a little envious about not being as close to Ayumu as the others, they assure her that they came along because they wanted to all enjoy each other. They soon make it to the top of the mountain, where they are greeted by a beautiful starstorm. Upon returning to school, Ayumu finds himself the affectionate target of Sarasvati, who is obsessed with Ayumu's bottom. Meanwhile, Ariel is seen confronting Kyoko.
3	"Yo! That's Some Friendly You-nity!"; Transliteration: "Yo! Sore wa You! Jō!" (Japanese: Yo！それはYou！情！)	April 19, 2012
As Sera has trouble understanding Sarasvati's fascination with Ayumu's rear, Haruna attempts to fix Mystelltain by herself, but it all comes to pieces when Ayumu tries to use it too early. Meanwhile, Haruna tries to help Yuki practice to be a backup dancer for Sarasvati's concert, only for the dance to turn out to be a curse. With Sarasvati threatening to send Yuki back to her village if she doesn't perfect the dance, Ayumu helps her get some last minute practice. Come the concert, the dance becomes a super curse that forces everyone to dance til they drop.
4	"No, Get Lost, Good Sir"; Transliteration: "Iya, Kaere Goshujin-sama" (Japanese: いや、帰れご主人様)	April 26, 2012
Wanting him to get out of his crossdressing phase, Orito takes Ayumu to a 'tsundere' cosplay café owned by Sarasvati's clan, where Sera, Yuki and Haruna are also working. There, Ayumu is thrown into a challenge in which he must try to bring out the 'dere' side of five waitresses for a free dessert, with a large price to pay should he fail. After getting past Yuki, Sera, Haruna and even Eucliwood, Ayumu struggles against Kanami, but manages to win when Orito makes a confession to her. Afterwards, Ayumu discovers that his classmate, Anderson, is from the underworld.
5	"Yes, It Goes Around Every Year"; Transliteration: "Hai, Maitoshi Hayattemasu" (Japanese: はい、毎年流行ってます)	May 3, 2012
As Sera goes to a meeting with the other vampires, Eucliwood comes down with a fever, so Ayumu and Haruna spend the day looking after her. The next day, Anderson explains that Eu's symptoms came from eating too much tangerine pith, which is considered poisonous to denizens of the underworld, and resort to bizarre remedies to get her back to health. Afterwards, Haruna catches a cold from overworking herself so Ayumu and Eucliwood look after her instead.
6	"No Way, We Were Winning!"; Transliteration: "Chaunen, Kateteten" (Japanese: ちゃうねん、勝てててん)	May 10, 2012
As Dai-sensei reports to Ayumu that Mystletainn will soon return home good as new, preparations begin for the school festival, with Haruna contributing her egg-cooking knowledge and Ayumu's class deciding to do a haunted café. On the day before the festival, Ayumu encounters a curious man who gives him a ring. After Ayumu spends the evening working on preparations with Taeko, he returns home to find that Mystletainnn has returned and uses it to remove everyone's memories of that unfortunate incident. However, to his misfortune, his classmates force him to crossdress anyway to advertise the café. Yuki asks Ayumu to accompany her in accordance to a letter she received, only to get hit by a prank and ends up summoning Mysticore again. The man from before appears, telling Ayumu to put the ring he received onto Yuki, which surpresses Mysticore so Yuki won't become a weapon anymore, although she mistakes it for a wedding ring when she wakes up. Just then, some Megalos appear in the culture festival, so Haruna, using a device to absorb some of Eucliwood's mana, transforms into a Masō-Shōjo alongside Ayumu in order to defeat them. Afterwards however, Haruna starts to experience an intense headache.
7	"Mm-hmm, Teacher is the Greatest!"; Transliteration: "Un, Sensei ga Saikyō da yo!" (Japanese: うん、先生が最強だよ！)	May 17, 2012
As a result of absorbing Eucliwood's mana, Haruna now experiences the same pains Eucliwood usually faces when speaking and being expressive. As the second day of the festival goes underway, Haruna throws her mana-absorption device away while Yuki has her ring confiscated by the teacher. At the end of the festival, the same teacher reveals himself to be the fairy Ayumu had met, a Masō-Shōjo named Chris who was Dai-sensei's mentor, who had used Haruna's device to absorb enough mana to undo a curse placed upon her. After launching the entire class into the sky, she manages to beat Ayumu before escaping with everyone's mana. As Dai-sensei gets word of Chris's revival, Kyoko offers to make a deal with her.
8	"Whoo, a Mixer with Kyoko!"; Transliteration: "Fū, Kyōko-chan Gōkon da ze!" (Japanese: フー、京子ちゃん合コンだゼッ！)	May 24, 2012
Kyoko suddenly shows up at the Aikawa household, having been released by Dai-sensei to speak with Ayumu. She agrees to tell Ayumu about Chris's weakness, which she heard from the King of the Night, on the condition that he entertain her. As such, she asks Ayumu to organize a mixer event, inviting all the other girls. As Kyoko doesn't seem too impressed when Dai-sensei shows up, Ayumu decides to take Kyoko to the graveyard and allow her to do whatever she wants to him in exchange for the information. She suddenly stabs him but at the same time embraces him and confesses that she loves him. As Kyoko laments about how everyone will lose their memory of her when she returns to prison, Ayumu says he will still remember her. After leaving, Kyoko sends Ayumu the details of Chris's weakness, which turns out to simply be that she is ticklish.
9	"Ah, My Darling is a Ne'er-do-well"; Transliteration: "Ā, Mai Dārin wa Rokudenashi" (Japanese: ああ、マイダーリンはロクデナシ)	May 31, 2012
Finding Kyoko's information useless, Ayumu is told by Dai-sensei to seek out the strongest underworld warrior, Naegleria Nebiros, who is an old friend of Eucliwood's. After agreeing to attend one of Saras's concerts, Ayumu meets up with Naegleria and ends up having to help her draw her doujinshi, with the others later joining him. As they learn the story is about Eucliwood and how things might've been for her, the gang become determined to complete it but get set back thanks to Sera's cooking. After completing a fair amount of work, Ayumu manages to make it to Saras's concert before it ends. After the concert, Saras takes Ayumu out to the roof and gives him a carton of coffee milk. When Ayumu is distracted while talking to Saras, Saras sucks on Ayumu's straw, thus marries Ayumu. The end of the episode shows Naegleria and Chris hanging out together, proving that they have a friendlike relationship.
10	"Still, That's Fine"; Transliteration: "Dakedo, Sore ga Ii" (Japanese: だけど, それがいい)	June 7, 2012
As Dai-sensei takes over as teacher for Ayumu's class, she decides to put Ayumu through a trial, threatening to erase his memories should he fail. A class taught by Haruna soon comes under chaos when she accidentally creates a giant, "indecent" slime (it dissolves clothing). Judging Ayumu's ability to handle the situation as a failure, Dai-sensei takes away Ayumu's memories. As Haruna, Eucliwood and Sera express their desire to bring Ayumu's memories back, Dai-sensei gives them the opportunity to dive into his consciousness and recover his memories. Finding a remnant of Ayumu's memories, the girls soon come across representations of Ayumu's various emotions, but easily beat them. They soon come across the representation of Ayumu's sloth, Belphegor, who takes over Ayumu's body. As Eucliwood confronts Ayumu in her Masō-Shōjo mode, she shows him all the notes she had written for him and, working with Haruna, manages to bring back his memories. At the end of the episode, a new girl holding a talking doll (who is believed to be Lilia Lilith, the queen of Villiers) is shown to have an interest in Ayumu, foreshadowing things to come. The episode then concludes after showing short scenes of Naegleria and Chris, Saras and Yuki, and the Aikawa household.
11 (OVA)	"Yes, This Suits Me Just Fine"; Transliteration: "Hai, Mi no Take ni Attemasu" (Japanese: はい、身の丈に合ってます)	October 20, 2012
Ayumu and co. take part in a flea market in which Haruna is challenged by Orito to earn the most money. Although Haruna has trouble making sales, the others pitch in to help. After the market closes, Ayumu accidentally drinks something that turns him invisible. Whilst invisible, Ayumu is tasked by Haruna to go into school during a physical exam and find a pendant one of the girl's bought, eventually managing to retrieve it from Taeko, only to find out later that it was a fake and that the real one was found at home under a sofa cushion by Sera.
