= Goita (game) =

Japanese traditional game from Noto, Ishikawa

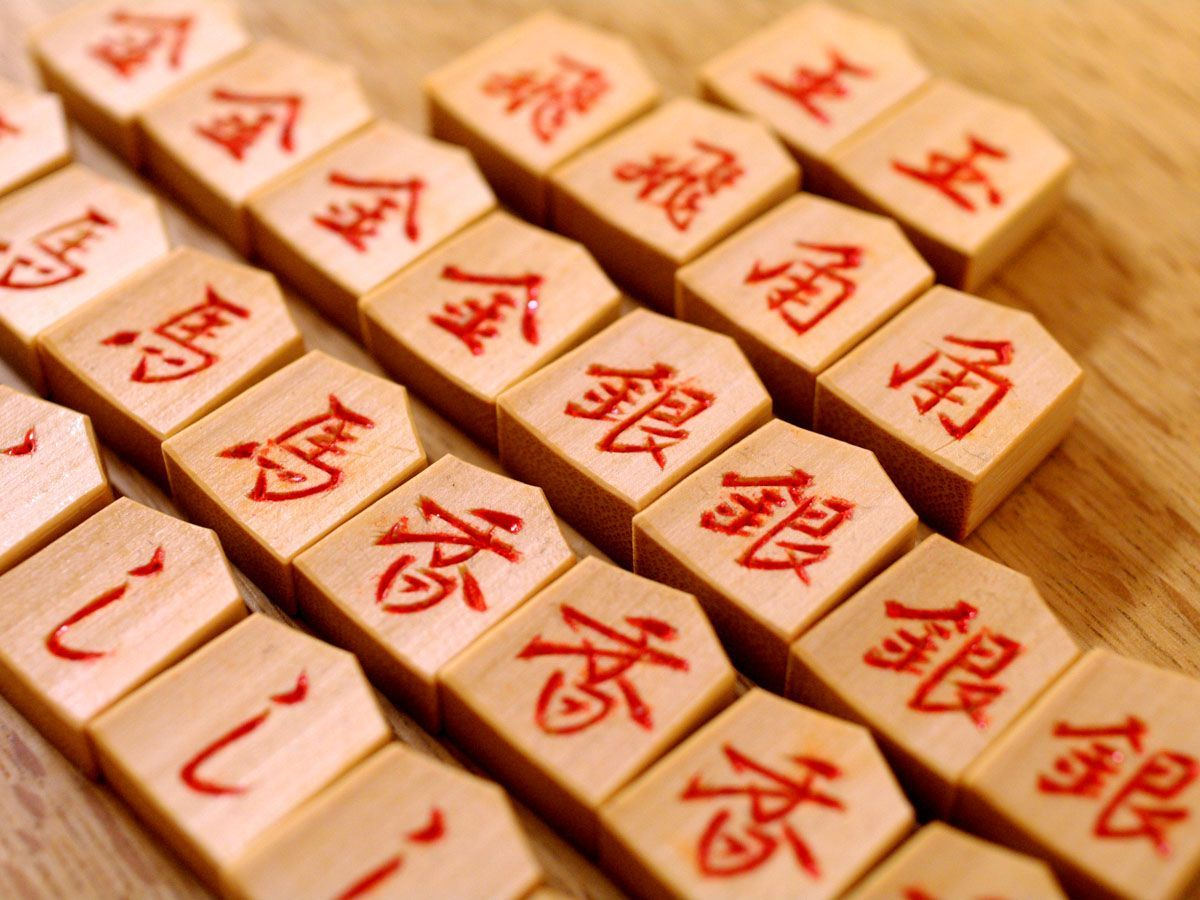
Goita tiles laid out

Goita (ごいた) is a traditional Japanese game from Noto, Ishikawa played with 32 tiles or cards similar to Shogi pieces. Unlike actual Shogi pieces, the tiles are the same size and have blank backs. It may be a descendant of an earlier Meiji period game played with 40 or 42 cards. It is related to Iro Kammuri (Color Crowns) played with uta-garuta.

== Equipment and rules ==
| Amount | Symbol | Name | Points |
|---|---|---|---|
| 2 | 王 | King | 50 |
| 2 | 飛 | Rook | 40 |
| 2 | 角 | Bishop | 40 |
| 4 | 金 | Gold general | 30 |
| 4 | 銀 | Silver general | 30 |
| 4 | 馬 | Knight | 20 |
| 4 | 香 | Lance | 20 |
| 10 | し | Pawn | 10 |

There are eight types of tiles or cards with different point values. There are only ten pawns unlike Shogi which has 18. Tiles are typically made of wood or bamboo about 2 cm × 1 cm in size.

Four players are split into two partnerships sitting across from each other. Deal and play is counter-clockwise. The object of the game for each partnership is to score 150 points over a series of hands. The objective of each hand is to be the first side to have a player play out all his cards.

After each player is dealt a hand of eight cards, the players take their time to inspect them. A hand can be immediately won if one player is dealt eight, seven, or six pawns. With eight pawns, 100 points is scored. With seven, the remaining card's points are doubled. With six, the higher of the two cards is scored but if both are identical then both score. If both partners have five pawns each, they are awarded 150 points thus ending the game immediately. If one partner has five but the other does not, the player without five pawns has the option of forcing a redeal.

The dealer plays two cards, one face down and the other face up. The next player can either pass or play two cards face up, one which matches the revealed card (the "defense card") and the other for the next player to match (the "attack card"). Kings are wild cards which can match any card except for lances and pawns. Kings are not allowed to be attack cards unless one has been played already or if the player has both kings. If three players consecutively pass so that it returns to the original player, he may start a new attack by playing any card face down and a new attack card face up.

The winning partnership's score is based on the going-out card. If the last defense card and going-out card are identical and played after three consecutive passes, then both cards are scored. The winning player becomes the next dealer and play continues until one side reaches 150 points.

== See also ==
- Karuta
