= Oishi Tengudo =

Japanese game manufacturer

Kyoto Oishi Tengudo Corporation
- Native name: 大石天狗堂
- Founded: 1800; 226 years ago
- Headquarters: Kyoto, Japan
- Key people: Naoki Maeda (前田直樹), 9th generation head; (CEO)
- Website: www.tengudo.jp

Oishi Tengudo (大石天狗堂) is a Kyoto-based Japanese manufacturer of playing cards and other traditional games, including go, hanafuda, and other karuta. With a handful of exceptions, all their cards are still made by hand.

The company logo is a tengu mask with a long nose.

== History ==
The company itself states they were founded under the name Minatoya in 1800 by an Oishi Kuranosuke, during the Edo period, when both selling and using hanafuda and many other karuta for gambling was illegal. To get around this, their cover business was that of a rice merchant, and the production and selling of hanafuda and other karuta happened strictly under the counter. If the official founding date of 1800 could be independently verified, this would make Oishi Tengudo the oldest card manufacturer continuously producing cards in the world, though since the production was illicit at the time, there is only scant evidence for this founding date.

The name "Tengudo" was most likely adopted after hanafuda was legalized in the middle of the Meiji period. At this time, they were sold in Tokyo through a reseller called Nishimura Shoten, who took out several newspaper advertisements for their cards.

The "gwang" (or "hikari") marks seen on modern Korean hanafuda ("hwatu") stem from an innovation by Oishi Tengudo according to the 7th head Masafumi Maeda. Oishi Tengudo would stamp the 20-point cards in some of their decks with a gold stamp, and some of these decks were subsequently exported to Korea, before World War II, when Korea was annexed by Japan.

While in the 1930s, the company had 30 employees, in 2000, that number had been reduced to only 6. The demand for hanafuda decreased precipitously in the mid-1970s, and the market was largely dominated by Nintendo, who had begun mass-producing hanafuda soon after the war (around 1955, a couple of years after the construction of their first factory, they held 95% of the market). Oishi Tengudo were one of few traditional playing card manufacturers able to survive thanks to a "silent boom" in their hyakunin isshu karuta sales. Though the company is small, it held half the market in terms of hyakunin isshu sales in 2000, largely due to being the official manufacturer for competitive karuta.

== Notable products ==
Oishi Tengudo was commissioned by Japan's first prime minister Itō Hirobumi to produce a 'Prime Minister's edition' of Hanafuda. Reproductions are still sold in Paulownia-wood boxes.

They are the only commercial manufacturer recently producing Tensho karuta, the earliest pattern of playing card produced in Japan. Oishi Tengudo have released a hanafuda together with Studio Ghibli, containing illustrations of characters from the movie Spirited Away. They have also released a limited edition hanafuda in subdued "coffee-inspired" colors for the launch of Starbucks Reserve Roastery's first store in Tokyo.
