= Keitaro Kumehara =

Japanese author and karuta player

Keitaro Kumehara (粂原 圭太郎; born 13 June 1991) is a Japanese author, competitive karuta player, and teacher. He was the karuta meijin for 2019 to 2021 after taking the title on 5 January 2019 at Omi Jingu. He is a graduate from Kyoto University from the Faculty of Economics and goes on lectures across Japan. He is currently crowdfunding an online English learning tool.
