= Kai-awase =

Japanese traditional pastime

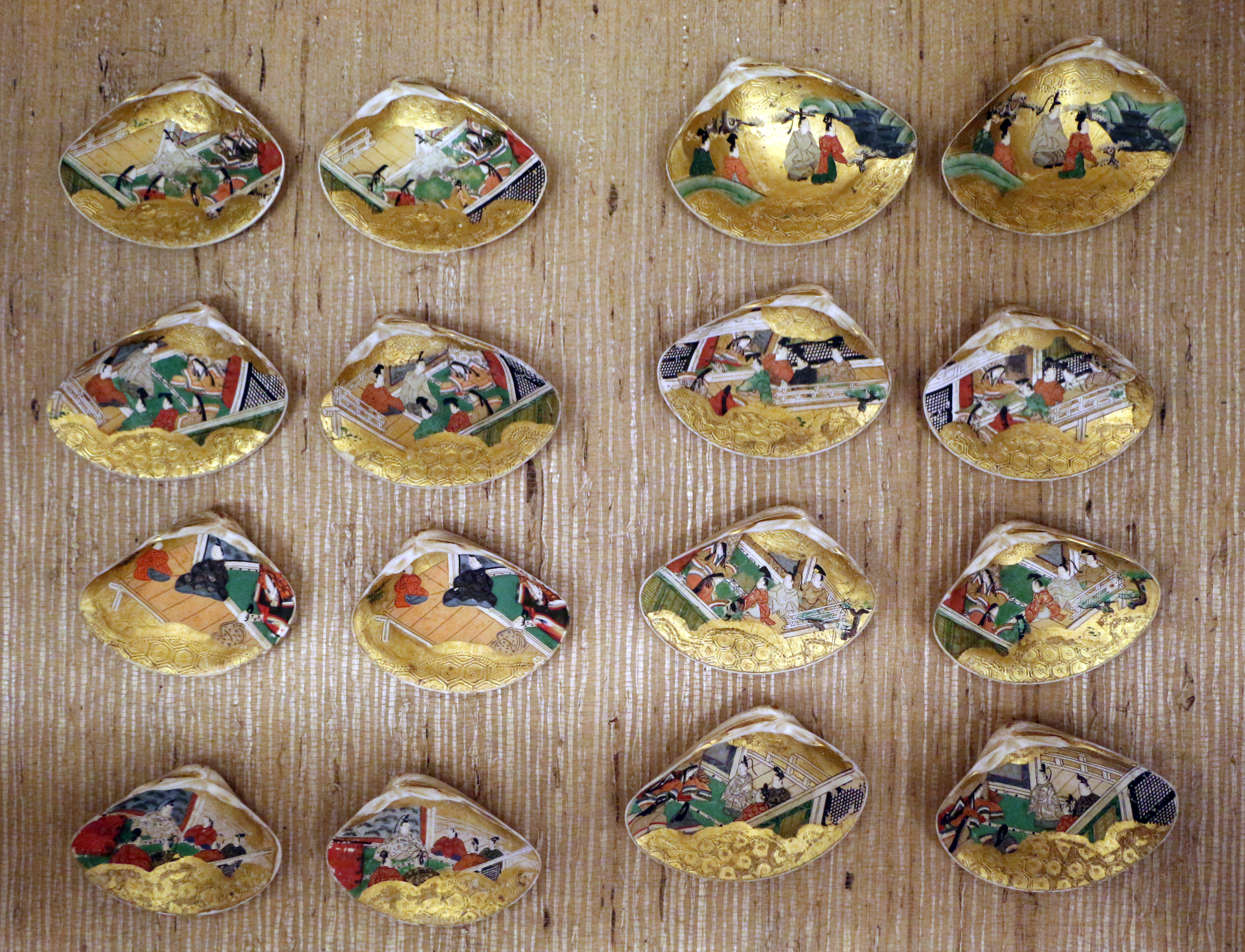
Kai-awase shells, Edo period

Kai-awase (貝合わせ "shell-matching") is a Japanese game with shells, typically the shells of the hamaguri clam.

The shells in the inside would have elaborate paintings, often depicting scenes from the Tale of Genji. The aim of the game was to find the other half that would fit.

The game of e-awase would develop from it later.

== History ==
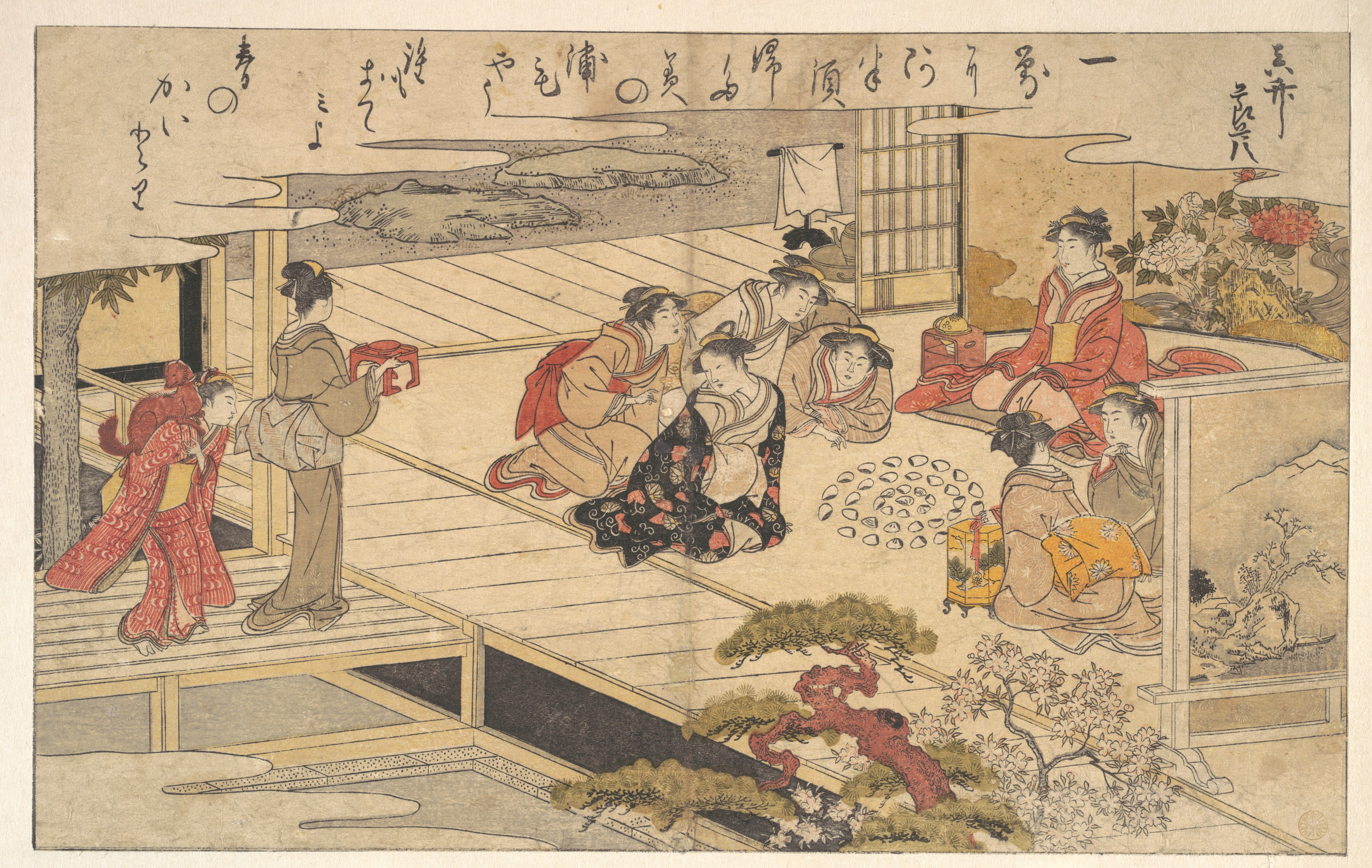
Women playing kai-awase, print by Kitagawa Utamaro, 1790

Kai-awase is a game that started in the Heian period. The original game, using shells, was played by Heian aristocrats who would compose poems about the shape, size, and color of clams, and then compete against each other to see how well they wrote songs. It became popular among aristocrats in the late 12th century. During the late 12th century, "Kaiōi" was a game in which multiple pieces of clam shells were mixed up, separated from the left and right sides, and players would find a pair among them. "Kaiōi" began as a game for women from the late Heian period to the Kamakura period, but by the late 13th century, it came to be called "Kai-awase". In the late 13th century, shells became increasingly elaborate and beautiful for the purpose of play and comparison. Gold and silver were even added to them, making them gradually become decorative items. During the Sengoku period to the Edo period, the shells of kai-awase were also used as decorations with blessings in upper-class weddings. In the modern context, the meaning of the word "Kai-awase" has evolved to refer more to shellfish matching, which is a game of matching pairs of objects, rather than a competition of reciting songs.

== Gameplay ==
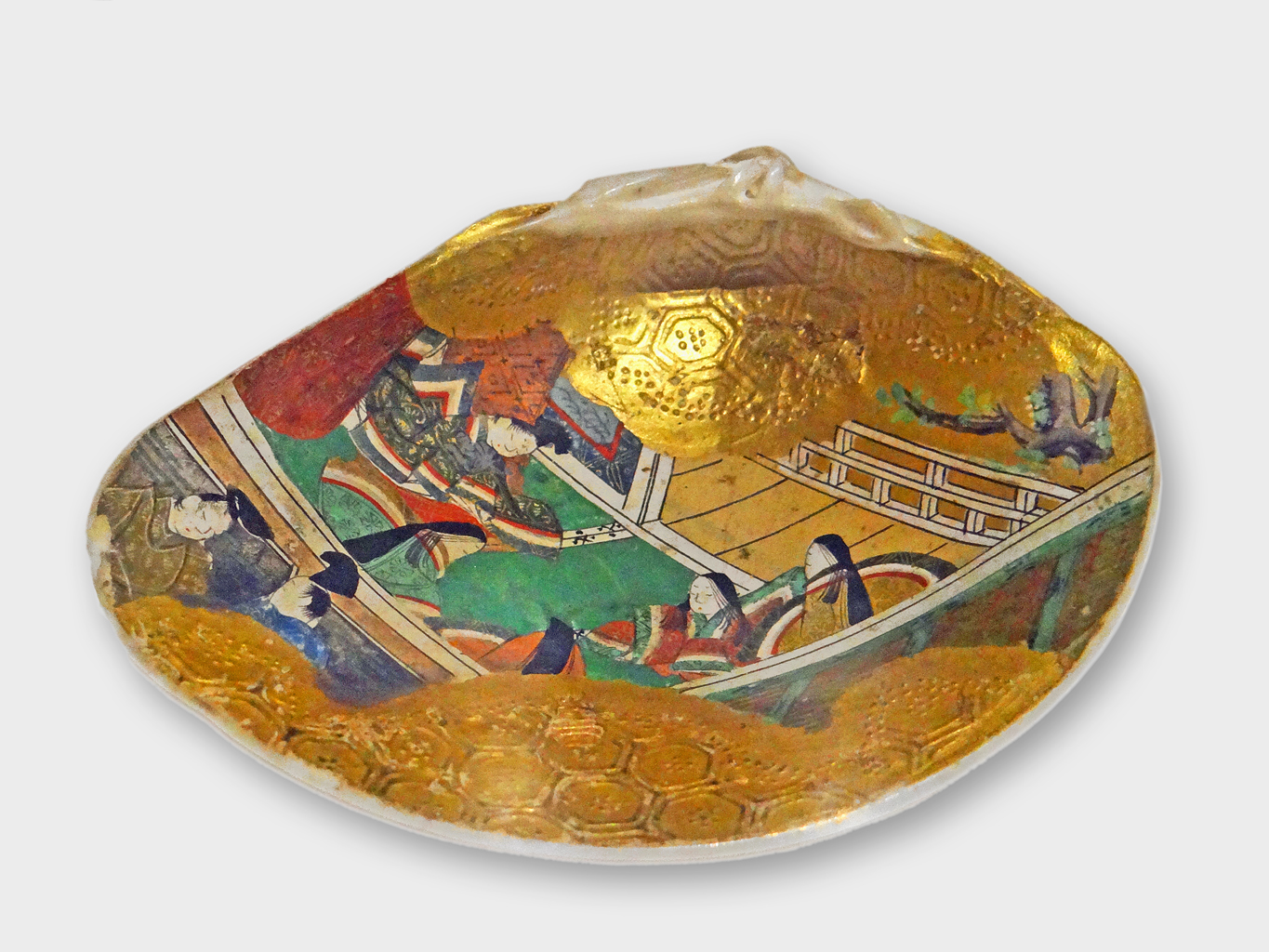
Painted game piece, 18th century

At the beginning, the game only competed for superiority based on the shape, color, size, and variety of shellfish, which were divided into left and right sides. Then, in the late Heian period, the gameplay became more complicated. The game required 360 clam shells, divided into both left and right shells, with the right shell called jigai (地貝) and the left shell called dashigai (出貝). When playing, all the jigai are arranged face down in a circle so that the drawings cannot be seen. Then, the dashigai are taken out one by one from the center, and players must find the jigai that pairs perfectly with each shellfish. The person who finds the matching jigai wins the round. In the end, the person who matches the most shellfish is the winner. In later generations, songs were also written separately, with drawings inside a pair of shells.
