= E-awase =

Japanese game

絵合
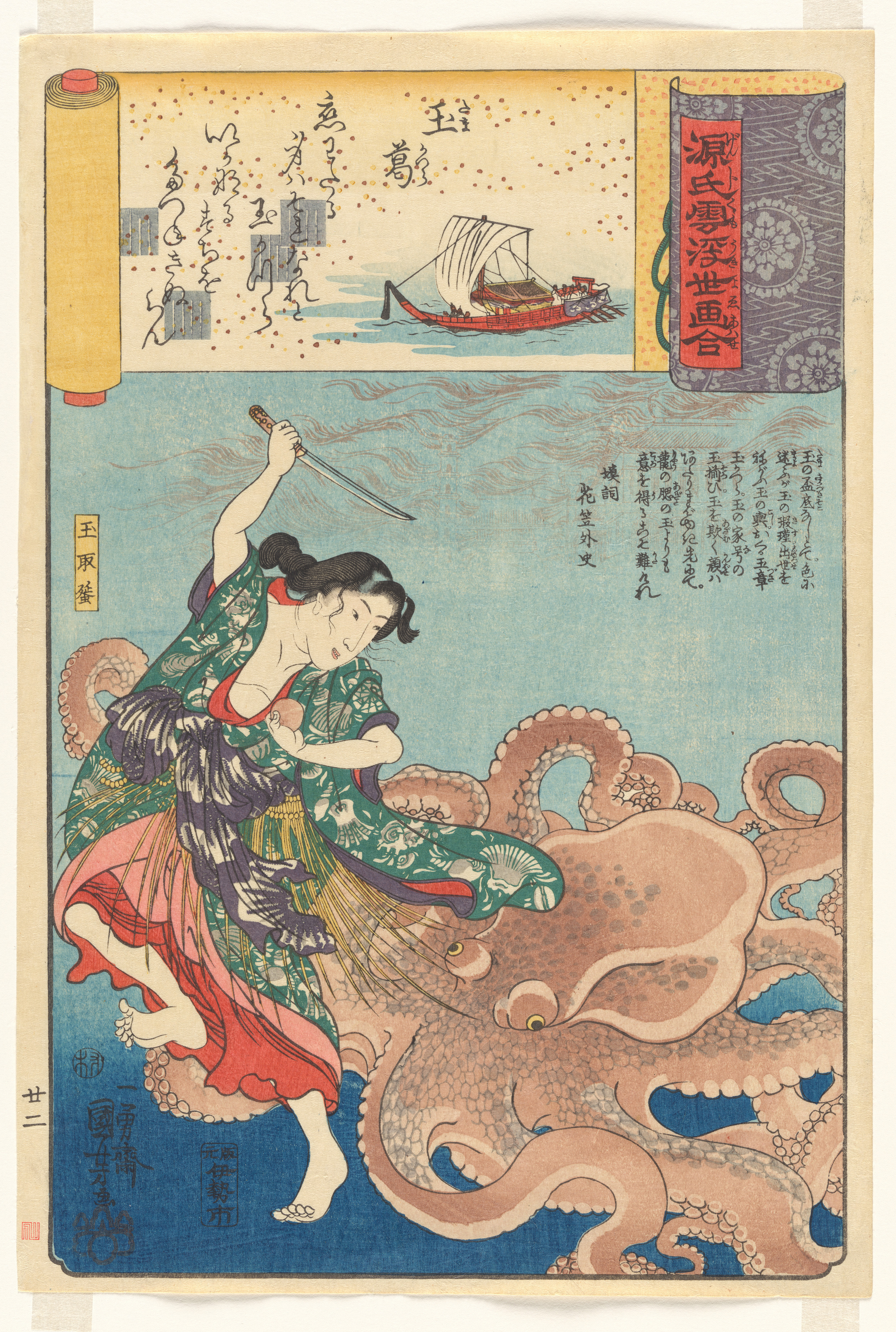
- An Ukiyo-e print from Utagawa Kuniyoshi’s e-awase series. The image depicts Tamatori, Fujiwara no Kamatari’s driver, fighting an octopus, 1845-6
- Years active: Kamakura period
- Players: 2 teams
- Skills: Painting

E-awase (絵合, painting contest) was a pastime popular among Japanese nobles during the Kamakura period, although its history dates back to the Heian.

In an e-awase contest, participants were divided into two teams and created paintings on a predetermined topic, which were then judged by their peers, as in the older uta-awase poetry contests. It was a popular entertainment at parties and social gatherings. An e-awase contest of this type appears in The Tale of Genji, forming the central theme of chapter 17.

An alternative version of the picture contest was simpler, with players matching or associating pre-painted images. This was a development of an older game known as kai-awase (貝合 "shell matching"). Matching scenes would be painted on the inner surfaces of a number of clam shells; these would then be spread on the floor, image side down, and turned over by competitors who would attempt to match the corresponding images.
