= Uta-garuta =

Traditional Japanese card game

- 歌ガルタ
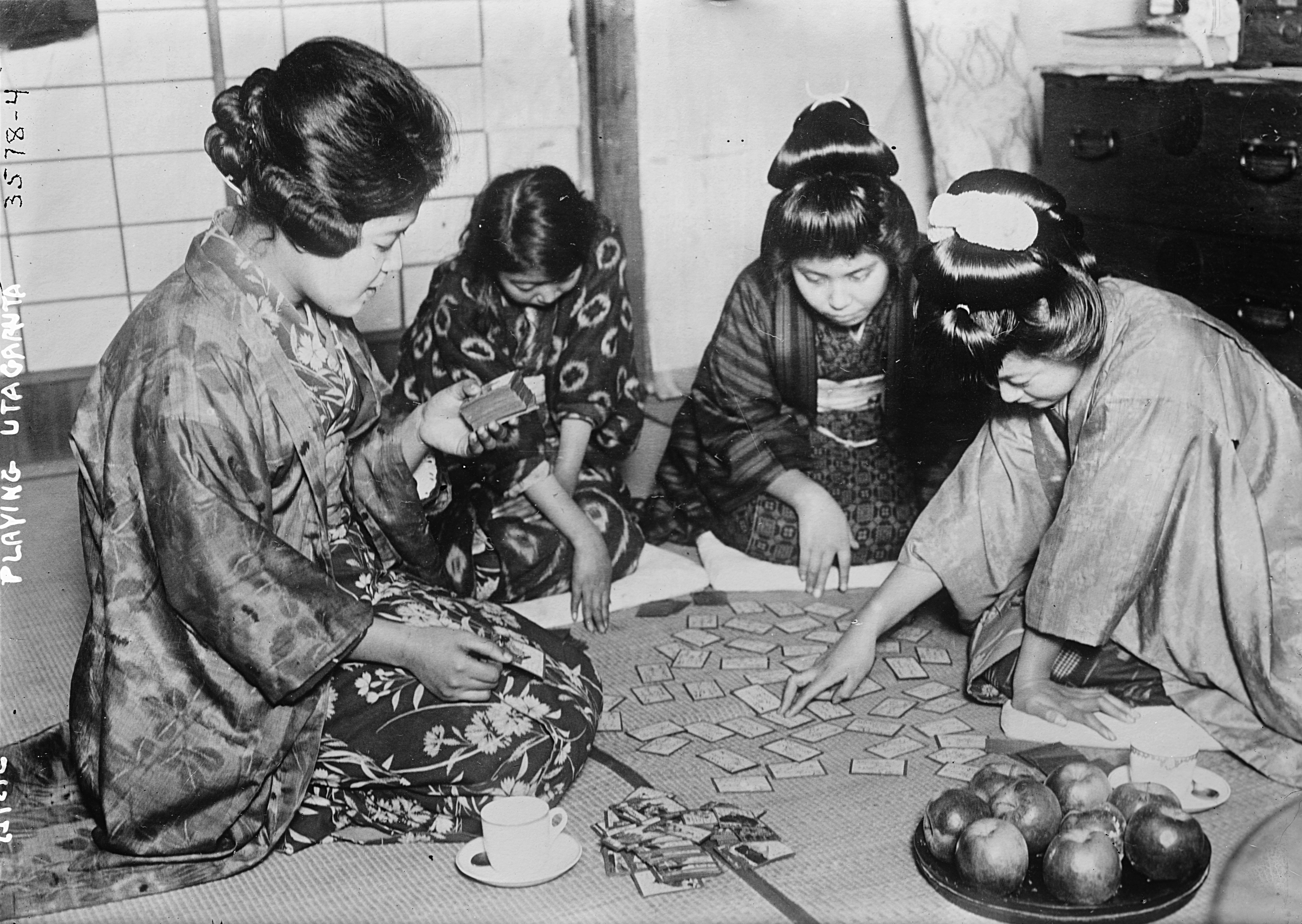
- A photograph of the game being played by a group of women, c. 1900
- Named variant: Chirashi-dori; Genpei-gassen
- Type: Karuta
- Cards: 100
- Deck: 2

Uta-garuta (歌ガルタ; lit. "Poetry Karuta") is a type of a deck of karuta, Japanese traditional playing cards. A set of uta-garuta contains two sets of 100 cards, with a waka poem written on each. Uta-garuta is also the name of the game in which the deck is used. The standard collection of poems used is the Hyakunin Isshu, chosen by poet Fujiwara no Teika in the Kamakura period, which is often also used as the name of the game.

Since early 20th century the game is played mostly on Japanese New Year holidays.

== How to play ==
=== Basic rules ===
The game uses two types of cards.

- Yomifuda (lit. "Reading Cards"): One hundred cards with a figure of a person, their name, and a complete poem by them on each.
- Torifuda (lit. "Grabbing Cards"): One hundred cards with only the finishing phrases of the poems on each.

The game is played with the players seated on the floor. At the start of a game, 100 torifuda are neatly arranged on the floor face up between the players. When the reader starts reading out a poem on the yomifuda, the players quickly search for the torifuda on which the corresponding final phrase is written.

There are two ways to play the game based on the rules above.

=== Chirashi-dori ===
One reader, three or more players:

1. Mix up the deck of torifuda, and lay them out on the floor. Players sit around the cards.
2. The reader draws a yomifuda and starts reading it out loud. Players attempt to recognize the poem being read as soon as possible, and race to find and take the corresponding torifuda as soon as they do.
3. When a player has taken the corresponding torifuda, the reader moves on to the next yomifuda.
4. When all the cards are taken, the player with the most cards wins the game.

=== Genpei-gassen ===
This playing style takes its name from the Genpei war.

One reader, two teams of one or more players each:

1. Divide the players into two groups. The two groups are called Genji and Heike.
2. Mix up the torifuda, and give 50 cards to each side.
3. Genji and Heike sit face to face. Lay out 50 cards in front of each group in three lines facing the group.
4. Gameplay is the same as in Chirashi-dori. Players can take cards from either side.
5. If a player takes a card from the opponent's side, they can move one card from their own side to the opponent's side.
6. If a player takes a wrong card, the opponent can move one card to the player's side as a penalty.
7. The side that has no more torifuda on their side wins the game.

=== Strategy ===
The odds of winning increase if one knows the phrases. One even may be able to take a card immediately after hearing the reader read aloud only the first letters of the yomifuda poem. Technique in reading is also very important, having to know how to correctly space out the words and the seconds of the pause.

== Competitive karuta ==
In Japan there are national conventions for the competitive format of the game.

== In popular culture ==
The manga, anime series and live action movie Chihayafuru portrays the story of a group of young people who competitively play Hyakunin Isshu karuta with the aim of becoming best in the world. The series debuted in 2007, and its popularity has boosted the popularity of competitive karuta in Japan and abroad.

In the manga and anime series Nanbaka, uta-garuta is the 3rd Event of the New Year Joint Cooperation tournament.

The 21st movie of the Detective Conan anime series, Crimson Love Letter, features a uta-garuta competition as the main storyline.
