= Mone Kamishiraishi =

Japanese actress and singer (born 1998)

- 上白石 萌音
- Born: 27 January 1998 (age 28); Kagoshima, Kagoshima, Japan
- Education: Meiji University
- Occupations: Actress; voice actress; television personality; singer
- Years active: 2011–present
- Agent: Toho Entertainment
- Notable work: Lady Maiko; Chihayafuru : Kami no Ku / Shimo no Ku / Musubi; Your Name; An Incurable Case of Love
- Style: Film; Theatre; Television Drama
- Relatives: Moka Kamishiraishi (sister)
- Musical career
- Genre: J-pop
- Years active: 2016–present
- Labels: Pony Canyon; Universal J
- Website: kamishiraishimone.com

Mone Kamishiraishi (上白石 萌音, Kamishiraishi Mone; born January 27, 1998) is a Japanese actress, voice actress, television personality, and singer. She is the older sister of actress Moka Kamishiraishi.

Kamishiraishi began her career after receiving the Special Jury Prize at the 2011 Toho Cinderella Audition and made her acting debut that year. She subsequently established herself as an actress in film, television, and theatre, notably starring in the films Lady Maiko (2014), Chihayafuru (2016–2018), and All the Long Nights (2024), and providing the voice of Mitsuha Miyamizu in the internationally successful animated film Your Name (2016). She has also played leading roles in television dramas including An Incurable Case of Love (2020) and the NHK morning drama Come Come Everybody (2021–2022). In theatre, she has appeared in productions including Knights' Tale – A Musical and Spirited Away, playing Chihiro in the latter's Japanese and international productions. Her acting has earned her numerous awards, including the Best Actress Award at the 11th Seiyu Awards for Your Name, the Best Actress Award at the 30th Yomiuri Theater Awards, and the Best Actress Award at the 16th Tama Film Awards; she was also awarded the 2025 Japan Academy Film Prize Award for Excellence in Leading Actress for All the Long Nights and the 2026 Kikuta Kazuo Theater Award for her performances in Daddy Long Legs and Spirited Away.

As a singer, Kamishiraishi made her solo debut in 2016 and has released albums and singles while also performing regularly in concerts.

== Early life and career ==
Born in Kagoshima, her family lived in Mexico for three years due to her father's work. She can speak English and a little bit of Spanish. Her musical school teacher suggested that she participate in the 2011 Toho Cinderella Audition – a competition held by the film company, Toho Entertainment – she won the Special Jury Prize. She made her drama debut in the final episode of the NHK Taiga drama Gō: Hime-tachi no Sengoku starring Juri Ueno. She made her musical debut in The King and I in 2012. She played an aspiring geisha in the musical film "Lady Maiko" directed by Masayuki Suo. She was in charge of the theme song "Maiko wa Lady" which was released as a single under the name "Koharu". In 2016, she rose to international prominence as the lead female role in Makoto Shinkai's anime film Your Name, in which she won the Best Actress Award at the 11th Seiyu Awards. Kamishiraishi used the piano which she displayed for A Forest of Wool and Steel. She also learned classical ballet at the same time as musicals. There is also a scene where she dances ballet in the fourth episode of the short movie "Sky Blue Story" "Mone Kamishiraishi ~ Nike and Snail ~". She played Kanade Ooe in Chihayafuru, Aoi Nishimori in the live action film L-DK: Two Loves, Under One Roof and Nanase Sakura from TBS hit drama "An Incurable Case of Love" in 2020. She starred in the drama series, "Oh My Boss! Love is a Separate Volume" as Nami Suzuki and the taiga drama Reach Beyond the Blue Sky as Tenshō-in Atsuhime. On December 24, 2020, it was announced that she will play the role of Yasuko in the 105th asadora Come Come Everybody. It is the first time in the history of an asadora that three actresses will play each characters as different heroines. Kamishiraishi and Rina Kawaei were selected through an audition from 3061 applicants.

== Filmography ==
=== Film ===
Year	Title	Role	Notes	Ref(s)
2011	Sorairo Monogatari: Dai 4-wa Mone Kamishiraishi –Nike to Katatsumuri–	Nike	Lead role	
2012	Wolf Children	Keno (voice)		
2013	Daijōbu 3-kumi	Fumino Nakanishi		
2014	Lady Maiko	Haruko Saigo	Lead role	
2016	Chihayafuru Part 1	Kanade Ōe		
2016	Chihayafuru Part 2	Kanade Ōe		
2016	Your Name	Mitsuha Miyamizu (voice)	Lead role	
2016	Drowning Love	Kana Matsunaga		
2017	Yo-kai Watch Shadowside: Oni-ō no Fukkatsu	Natsume Amano (voice)		
2018	Chihayafuru Part 3	Kanade Ōe		
2018	A Forest of Wool and Steel	Kazune Sakura		
2018	The Miracle of Crybaby Shottan	Mariko		
2019	L-DK: Two Loves, Under One Roof	Aoi Nishimori	Lead role	
2019	Startup Girls	Hikari Komatsu	Lead role	
2019	Talking the Pictures	Omiya		
2019	Weathering with You	Mitsuha Miyamizu (voice)		
2024	All the Long Nights	Misa Fujisawa	Lead role	
2024	Fushigi Dagashiya Zenitendō	Yodomi		
2025	The 35-Year Promise	Kyoko Nishihata (young)		
2026	Sukiyaki	Alice		
2027	Monet: Across the Sea of Time	Hanako Sugiyama		

=== Television ===
Year	Title	Role	Notes	Ref(s)
2011	Gō	Tokugawa Masako	Taiga drama	
2012	Koi Aji Oyako	Naho Nishiyama		
2017	Hokusai to Meshi Saeareba	Fumiko Yamada	Lead role	
2017	Message from the Mudflats	Mirai Katase	Lead role	
2017	Rikuoh	Akane Miyazawa		
2018	Segodon	Saigō Kiyo	Taiga drama	
2018	Suits	Haruka Fujishima	Episode 11	
2019	Memory Investigation: Shinjuku East Office Case File	Saki Toyama		
2019	Princess Michiko's Story Unknown Love and Anguish Trajectory	Hiroko Miyamoto		
2019	Tales of the Unusual 2019 Rain "Eternal Hero"	Aki Oba		
2019	The Peony Lantern: A Ghost Story	Otsuyu		
2019	Solitary Gourmet	Madoka Sawamura	Season 8, episode 2	
2019	Akahige 2 2nd "Kindness and Lies"	Oritsu		
2020	An Incurable Case of Love	Nanase Sakura	Lead role	
2020	Detective Novice Midnight Runner	Ami	Episodes 2 and 3	
2020	Memory Investigation: 2020 Special	Saki Toyama		
2020	Suits Season 2	Haruka Fujishima	Episodes 11, 13-15	
2020	Memory Investigation 2: Shinjuku East Office Case File	Saki Toyama		
2020	HTrue Horror Stories: 2020 Special Edition	Sasa Kiirodori	Lead role	
2020	Home Sweet Tokyo Season 4	Setsuko		
2021	Oh My Boss! Love not included	Nami Suzuki	Lead role	
2021	Reach Beyond the Blue Sky	Tenshō-in	Taiga drama	
2021	Nakamura Nakazo: Shusse no Kizahashi	Okishi	Mini-series	
2021–22	Come Come Everybody	Yasuko Tachibana	Lead role; Asadora	
2025	Hotei no Dragon	Tatsumi Tendo	Lead role	
2025	Chihayafuru: Full Circle	Kanade Ōe		
2026	Iroha's Love Runs Across Eras	Iroha	Lead role	
2027	The Shogunate Rebel	Michi	Taiga drama	

=== Stage ===
Year	Title	Role	Notes	Ref(s)
2012	The King and I	Louis T. Leonowens		
2014	Die Wolke	Yanna Belta	Lead role	
2015	Anne of Green Gables	Anne Shirley	Lead role	
2018	Two People on Mars	Sayaka		
2018	Knights' Tale - A Knight's Story	Flavina		
2019	Suite Massacre	Takiko Taguchi		
2020	Disney on CLASSIC Premium " Beauty and the Beast " in Concert	Belle	Lead role	
2020	Knights' Tale in Symphonic Concert	Flavina		
2021	Knights' Tale - A Knight's Story	Flavina		
2022	Spirited Away	Chihiro	Double starring with Kanna Hashimoto	

=== Variety TV shows ===
- TBS Sekai Kurabete Mitara - Regular MC (December 23, 2020 – present)
- NHK 21st Waga Kokoro no Osaka Melody - Host (October 26, 2021)
- Everyone's Best Kouhaku 100th Anniversary of Broadcasting Special (NHK, 2025) (host)
- Happyō! # Kotoshi Ichiban Kiita Uta ~ Nenkan Music Award 2026 ~ (Co-host with Junichi Okada) (2026)

=== Dubbing ===
Year	Title	Role	Notes	Ref(s)
2019	Animation x Paralympic: Who Is Your Hero?	Light	Lead role, TV Animation from NHK to promote Paralympics Games	
2019	Alita: Battle Angel	Alita	Lead role	
2020	Trolls World Tour	Queen Poppy	Lead role	
2021	Chibi Maruko-chan	Mysterious girl	Guest appearance	

=== Radio dramas ===
Year	Title	Role	Network	Notes
2018	All Night Nippon 50th Anniversary Special Radio Drama "Going out to a Bright Night"	Ai Sakoda	Nippon Broadcasting System	
2020	Virtual Post Office	Kotori Maezono	NHK-FM broadcast	Lead role

=== Radio ===
Year	Title	Network	Ref(s)
2016	Mone Kamishiraishi no All Night Nippon R	Nippon Broadcasting System	
2017–2019	Mone Kamishiraisi no Good Night Letter	Nippon Broadcasting System	
2018	Yoshio Inoue by MYSELF – Guest Appearance	TBS Radio	
2019	Summer Night Reading Concert Osamu Dazai "Schoolgirl"	NHK Radio	
2020	Radio Midnight Flight	NHK Radio	

=== Internet video ===
Year	Title	Role	Website	Notes	Ref(s)
2016	Nikui nē! Theater Dai 1-dan: House	Akane	Mitsubishi Electric	Lead role	
2019	Shinkenzemi Junior High School Preparation Course	Nozomi	Benesse	Short Animation	
2021	"Between mysteries and symbols: Yayoi Kusama's monochrome" Yayoi Kusama Museum	Herself	Meet Your Art	Narration	
2021	"Another Energy Exhibition: The Power to Continue to Challenge-16 Female Artists from the World" Mori Arts Center	Herself	Meet Your Art	Narration	
2021	"Rhizomatiks_Multiplex" Museum of Contemporary Art Tokyo	Herself	Meet Your Art	Narration	
2021	"Let's go out to the town-it started with the ripples of water-" Watarium Art Museum	Herself	Meet Your Art	Narration	

=== Promotional video ===
- Home Made Kazoku "Star to Line" (2011)
- HY "Happy" (2016)

=== CM ===
- Calpis "Hot Series" (2011)
- St. "20,000 Beats TOURS Musical" Anne of Green Gables (2015)
- Suntory Natural Water of the Southern Alps x Your name. Mitsuha's Thoughts – Voice Appearance (2016)
- Daito Trust Construction, To live is to entrust. "Family" / "To Tokyo" (2017)
- Game On "BLESS" (2017)
- Cabinet Office Society 5.0 "Future Right There" (2018)
- Apple Japan "iPhone Privacy-Simple Things" – Narration (2019)
- Bingo 5 with Ryunosuke Kamiki (2019)
- Suntory Foods "Iyemon" Tokucha (Special Tea Life) (2019)
- Daiichi Sankyo Health Care Minon Amino Moist (2019)
- Lottery "Dreaming Lottery" (2019)
- Bingo 5 with Ryunosuke Kamiki (Birthdays, other things and important errands) (2021)
- Lottery "Dreaming Lottery Cafe" (2021)
- Suntory Foods "Iyemon" Tokucha (Cleaning up is an exercise) (2021)
- Suntory Foods "Iyemon" Tokucha (Health chance) (2021)
- Daiichi Sankyo Health Care Minon Amino Moist (2021)
- ORIX (Corporate CM) "The world is sustainable. Orix is also sustainable." (2021)
- Takahashi Shoten "Notebook is Takahashi" (2021)

=== Advertisement ===
- Keikyu (2011)
- Takahashi Shoten "Notebook is Takashi" Image Character (2022 Edition)

=== Web advertising ===
- ELLE PROMOTION "Tasaki" Pearl Jewelry Mone Kamishiraishi and the Story of White Pearls (2020)

== Discography ==
=== Delivery ===
Year	Title	Notes	Ref(s)
2014	Maiko wa Lady	(Note: As Koharu.) Lady Maiko theme song	
2017	Confession	Pony Canyon	
2017	Your Voice	Released under Pony Canyon	
2019	Happy End	L-DK: Two Loves, Under One Roof ending theme composed by Takahito Uchizawa of rock band Androp.	
2019	Eienwa Kirai	Released under Universal Music Japan, written, composed and arranged by YUKI, n-buna.	
2019	Ichiru	Theme song of the movie "The Promised Land" composed by Yojiro Noda.	
2020	From the Seeds	Written by Glim Spanky, who provided the chorus and guitar. 7 Seeds theme song.	
2020	If You Squeeze Before the Dawn	Theme song of NHK Minna no Uta, composed by Yoshiki Mizuno from the rock band Ikimonogakari.	

=== Singles ===
Year	Title	Song	Notes	Ref(s)
2021	I'll be there / Spin	"Spin"	The song is said to be a 'companion' to her book "Iroiro" that was released digitally on the same day.	
2021	I'll be there / Spin	"I'll be there"	TBS show "King's Brunch" theme song for October	

=== Cover albums ===
Year	Title	Song	Notes	Highest Rank	Ref(s)
2016	chouchou	"366-Nichi"	Akai Ito theme song	3rd Place	(Note: Cover mini-album. First work in her name.)
2016	chouchou	"366-Nichi"	Japan Countdown theme song during October 2016	3rd Place	(Note: Cover mini-album. First work in her name.)
2016	chouchou	"366-Nichi"	Kago-New ending theme during October 2016	3rd Place	(Note: Cover mini-album. First work in her name.)
2016	chouchou	"Woman 'W no Higeki' yori"	W's Tragedy theme song	3rd Place	(Note: Cover mini-album. First work in her name.)
2016	chouchou	"Kawaranai mono"	The Girl Who Leapt Through Time insert song	3rd Place	(Note: Cover mini-album. First work in her name.)
2016	chouchou	"On My Own"	Les Misérables play song	3rd Place	(Note: Cover mini-album. First work in her name.)
2016	chouchou	"Nandemonaiya"	Your Name theme song	3rd Place	(Note: Cover mini-album. First work in her name.)
2016	chouchou	"Smile"	Modern Times insert song	3rd Place	(Note: Cover mini-album. First work in her name.)
2021	Ano Uta -1-	"Toshishita no Otoko no Ko "	Original by Candies (group)	6th Place	
2021	Ano Uta -1-	"Candy"	Original by Shinji Harada	6th Place	
2021	Ano Uta -1-	"Kimi wa Bara Yori Utsukushii"	Original by Akira Fuse	6th Place	
2021	Ano Uta -1-	"Yume Saki Annai Nin"	Original by Momoe Yamaguchi	6th Place	
2021	Ano Uta -1-	"Momen no Handkerchief"	Original by Hiromi Ōta	6th Place	
2021	Ano Uta -1-	"Good Bye My Love"	Original by Ann Lewis (musician)	6th Place	
2021	Ano Uta -1-	"Gandhara"	Original by Godiego	6th Place	
2021	Ano Uta -1-	"Katte ni Shiyagare"	Original by Kenji Sawada	6th Place	
2021	Ano Uta -1-	"Mizuiro no Ame"	Original by Junko Yagami	6th Place	
2021	Ano Uta -1-	"Olivia wo Kikinagara"	Original by Anri	6th Place	
2021	Ano Uta -1-	"Saraba Koibito"	Original by Masaaki Sakai	6th Place	
2021	Ano Uta -2-	"Sekaijuu no Dare Yori Kitto"	Original by Miho Nakayama & Wands (band)	7th Place	
2021	Ano Uta -2-	"Dandelion~Osozaki no Tanpopo"	Original by Yumi Matsutoya	7th Place	
2021	Ano Uta -2-	"AXIA ~Kanashii Kotori~"	Original by Yuki Saito (actress)	7th Place	
2021	Ano Uta -2-	"Diamonds"	Original by Princess Princess (band)	7th Place	
2021	Ano Uta -2-	"Seifuku"	Original by Seiko Matsuda	7th Place	
2021	Ano Uta -2-	"Machibuse"	Original by Yumi Matsutoya	7th Place	
2021	Ano Uta -2-	"Black Pepper no Tappuri Kiita Watashi no Tsukutta Onion Slice"	Original by Stardust Revue	7th Place	
2021	Ano Uta -2-	"Ikareta BABY"	Original by Fishmans	7th Place	
2021	Ano Uta -2-	"Aozora"	Original by The Blue Hearts	7th Place	
2021	Ano Uta -2-	"PRIDE"	Original by Miki Imai	7th Place	

=== Original albums ===
Year	Title	Song	Tie-up	Personnel	Highest Rank	Ref(s)
2017	and...	"Kokuhaku"	Fuji TV's "Mezamashi TV Aqua" 2017 Theme Song	Lyrics & Composition: Motohiro Hata Arrangement: Makoto Minagawa	25th Place	
2017	and...	"Sunny"		Lyrics: Mone Kamishiraishi Composition/Arrangement: Koichi Tabo, Hironori Kojima	25th Place	
2017	and...	"Puzzle"	Rinne of the Boundary Season 3 Ending Theme Song	Lyrics: Shoko Fujibayashi Composition / Arrangement: Hiroko Sebu	25th Place	
2017	and...	"Kimini"		Lyrics: Mone Kamishiraishi Composition: Sakura Fujiwara Arrangement: Shingo Sekiguchi	25th Place	
2017	and...	"Cassette Tape"		Lyrics & Composition: Shun Naka (HY)	25th Place	
2017	and...	"String"		Lyrics: Mone Kamishiraishi Composition / Arrangement: Ittetsu String	25th Place	
2017	and...	"The Voice of Hope"		Lyrics: Yuho Iwasato Composition / Arrangement: Shin Kono	25th Place	
2017	and...	"Story Board"		Lyrics&Composition: Takahito Uchizawa (Androp), Arrangement: Masanori Shimada	25th Place	
2019	i	Eienwa Kirai (I Hate Eternity)		Lyrics: YUKI Composition / Arrangement: n-buna	12th Place	
2019	i	Ao		Lyrics: Izumi Soraya Composition: Yasuna Sakai Arrangement: Hiroaki Yokoyama	12th Place	
2019	i	Happy End	L-DK: Two Loves, Under One Roof Ending Theme	Lyrics, Composition & Arrangement: Takahito Uchizawa (Androp)	12th Place	
2019	i	Go Around		Lyrics: mio Composition: GENEMAI Arrangement: Hiroaki Yokoyama	12th Place	
2019	i	One by One		Lyrics: Mone Kamishiraishi, Hidenori Tanaka, Composer: Kikuiketerou Arrangement: Ito standing Hidenori Tanaka	12th Place	
2020	note	White Mud	Anime "Major 2nd" Season 2 Series Opening Theme	Lyrics & Composition: Eriko Hashimoto Arrangement: Toshiya Shimizu	3rd Place	
2020	note	Downpour		Lyrics: Sou Composition / Arrangement: Kohei Munemoto	3rd Place	
2020	note	Eienwa Kirai (I Hate Eternity)		Lyrics: YUKI Composition / Arrangement: n-buna	3rd Place	
2020	note	From The Seeds	Anime 7SEEDS Season 2 Opening Theme	Lyrics: Remi Matsuo (GLIM SPANKY) Composition: GLIM SPANKY Arrangement:Hiroki Kamemoto (GLIM SPANKY)	3rd Place	
2020	note	Yawn		Lyrics: Mone Kamishiraishi Composition / Arrangement: Tetsuro Toyama	3rd Place	
2020	note	Statice		Lyrics: Kengo Ohama Composition / Arrangement: Kengo Ohama	3rd Place	
2020	note	Yoake wo Kuchizusametara (If I Could Sing a Song of Dawn)	NHK Minna no Uta (April–May 2020 On-air song) Musical "Little Zombie Girl" Theme Song	Lyrics & Composition: Yoshiki Mizuno Arrangement: Kohei Munemoto	3rd Place	
2020	note	Happy End	L-DK: Two Loves, Under One Roof Ending Theme	Lyrics, Composition & Arrangement: Takahito Uchizawa (Androp)	3rd Place	
2020	note	Little Birds		Lyrics: micca Composition: Yoshinori Ohashi (Ohashi Trio) Arrangement: Yoshinori Ohashi, Satoshi Takeshima	3rd Place	
2020	note	Ichiru	Movie "The Promised Land" Theme Song	Lyrics / Composition / Arrangement: Yojiro Noda (Radwimps)	3rd Place	

The deluxe edition of "note" which is titled "note book" was released on December 23, 2020. It contains the sound source from the online live concert "inote".

=== Music video ===
1. The Favorite Songs Vol.1 "Kanade" (February 24, 2015)
2. The Favorite Songs Vol.2 "Home" (September 18, 2015)
3. "366 Days" from the album "chouchou" (September 30, 2016)
4. "Storyboard" (July 6, 2017)
5. "Confession" (July 11, 2017)
6. Mone Kamishiraishi x Takahito Uchisawa (Androp) "Happy End" Aoi version from the movie "L-DK: Two Loves, Under One Roof " (April 5, 2019)
7. "Eienwa Kirai" (June 12, 2019)
8. "Ichiru" (Movie "Paradise" collaboration MV) (October 14, 2019)
9. "From The Seeds" Full Version (February 25, 2020)
10. "If You Squeeze the Dawn" (May 11, 2020)
11. "Shiroidoro" Short Ver. (August 22, 2020)
12. Mone Kamishiraishi x Takahito Uchizawa (Androp) "Happy End" Short Ver. featuring actor Yosuke Sugino (December 17, 2020)

=== Participation works ===
Year	Title	Song	Label
2014	Lady Maiko Musical Songs & Soundtrack Collection		Pony Canyon
2018	CHANPURU STORY ~ HY tribute	Happy	Universal Music Japan
2019	Off Course Classics	Goodbye	Universal Music Japan
2021	Ohashi Trio "NEW WORLD" duet song	Milk and Sugar	Rhythm Zone

=== One-man live concert ===
Year	Title	Ref(s)
2017	Live THEATER ~ chouchou ~	
2017	Mone Kamishiraishi LIVE TOUR 2017 "and ..."	
2020	Mone Kamishiraishi online live "i note"	
2021	Mone Kamishiraishi LIVE TOUR 2021 "yattokosa"	

== Bibliography ==
=== Books ===
- "Iroiro" published by NHK Publishing (2021)

=== Photo albums ===
- "a Button Vol. 9_Seishun: Mone Kamishiraishi/Moka Kamishiraishi" published by PARCO Publishing (2012)

=== Magazine serializations ===
- Beautiful Lady & Television "girls be ambitious" (2011)
- Radio English Conversation (April 2020 issue-NHK Publishing) "Journey over the translated letter" "Akage no Anne" (2020)

== Awards ==
Year	Award	Category	Work	Ref(s)
2011	7th Toho "Cinderella" Audition	Special Jury Prize	Herself	
2014	26th Fumiko Yamaji	New Actress Award	Lady Maiko	
2014	19th Japan Internet Film Award	New Face Break Award, Best Impact Award	Lady Maiko	
2014	Nationwide Philanthropic Award	Best Actress	Lady Maiko	
2015	38th Japan Academy Prize	Newcomer of the Year	Lady Maiko	
2017	11th Seiyu Awards	Best Lead Actress	Your Name	
2017	26th Japanese Professional Movie Awards	Emerging Actress Award	Drowning Knife, Chihayafuru	
2018	Wowow "Arbitrarily Theater Award 2018"	New Face Award	Knight's Tale	
2020	2019 All About Musical Award	Nova Award	Suite Slaughter	
2020	Oricon 1st Half Break Actress Ranking, First Place	Break Actress	Herself	
2020	Best Smile of the Year 2020	Female Celebrity	Herself	
2020	Model Press "Face of the Year"	Women's Edition	Herself	
2020	Yahoo! Search Awards	Actress	Herself	
2020	Oricon Break Actress Ranking	Break Actress	Herself	
2021	KKTV 2020 Annual Drama Awards	Best Actress	An Incurable Case of Love	
2021	2020 TVstation Drama Award	Best Actress	An Incurable Case of Love	
2021	45th Elan d'or Awards	Newcomer of the Year	Herself	
2021	30th TV Life Annual Drama Awards	Best Actress	An Incurable Case of Love	
2021	The 29th Hashida Award	New Face	An Incurable Case of Love	
