= Flower and the Beast =

Japanese manga series

- Cover of the Japanese version of vol. 1, first released on December 24, 2010

花にけだもの (Hana ni Kedamono)
- Genre: Romance
- Manga
- Written by: Miwako Sugiyama
- Published by: Shogakukan
- English publisher: SEA: M&C!
- Imprint: Flower Comics
- Magazine: Sho-Comi
- Original run: August 2010 – December 2012
- Volumes: 10
- Television drama

Hana ni Kedamono
- Directed by: Kentaro Otani; Ryō Miyawaki
- Written by: Miyako Matsumoto
- Original network: dTV; Fuji TV On Demand
- Original run: October 30, 2017 – January 1, 2018
- Episodes: 10
- Television drama

Hana ni Kedamono: Second Season
- Directed by: Kentaro Otani; Ryō Miyawaki
- Written by: Miyako Matsumoto
- Original network: dTV; Fuji TV On Demand
- Original run: July 5, 2019 – September 6, 2019
- Episodes: 5

Flower and the Beast (Japanese: 花にけだもの, Hepburn: Hana ni Kedamono) is a Japanese shōjo manga series by Miwako Sugiyama. Flower and the Beast was serialized in the bimonthly manga magazine Sho-Comi from August 2010 to December 2012. A live-action television drama adaptation ran in 2017, and a second season was broadcast in 2019.

== Plot ==
Kumi Kumakura transfers to a new high school and is given five special teddy bears created by her deceased mother to give to her new friends. On the night before her first day, Kumi comes across Hyō Kakizono, who she befriends and gifts one of her teddy bears. Hyō steals her first kiss, and the two become attracted to each other. When Kumi starts attending school, she is shocked to discover that not only is Hyō her new classmate, but he is also one of the most popular boys in school who is well known for being a playboy. Hyō, however, has fallen in love with Kumi, but she is unable to believe his words at face value and struggles to accept him.

== Characters ==
Kumi Kumakura (熊倉 久実, Kumakura Kumi)
Voiced by: Yumiri Hanamori (movie comic); portrayed by Yurika Nakamura (live-action TV)
Hyō Kakizono (柿木園 豹, Kakizono Hyō)
Voiced by: Taku Yashiro (movie comic); portrayed by Yosuke Sugino (live-action TV)
Tatsuki Hiyoshi (日吉 竜生, Hiyoshi Tatsuki)
Voiced by: Yoshitaka Yamaya (movie comic); portrayed by Shouma Kai (live-action TV)
Chihaya Izumi (和泉 千隼, Izumi Chihaya)
Voiced by: Yūichirō Umehara (movie comic); portrayed by Takashi Matsuo (live-action TV)
Kanna Ōgami (大神 カンナ, Ōgami Kanna)
Voiced by: Hisako Tōjō (movie comic); portrayed by Anna Iriyama (live-action TV)

== Media ==
=== Manga ===
Flower and the Beast is written and illustrated by Miwako Sugiyama. It is serialized in the bimonthly magazine Sho-Comi from August 2010 to December 2012. The chapters were later released in 10 bound volumes by Shogakukan under the Flower Comics imprint.

M&C! licensed the series in English for Southeast Asian distribution.

No.	Japanese release date	Japanese ISBN
1	December 24, 2010	978-4-0913-3529-6
2	March 25, 2011	978-4-0913-3687-3
3	July 26, 2011	978-4-0913-4042-9
4	October 26, 2011	978-4-0913-4138-9
5	January 26, 2012	978-4-0913-4027-6
6	April 26, 2012	978-4-0913-4514-1
7	July 26, 2012	978-4-0913-4627-8
8	October 26, 2012	978-4-0913-4408-3
9	January 25, 2013	978-4-0913-4846-3
10	May 24, 2013	978-4-0913-5189-0

=== Movie comic ===
A movie comic, featuring voiceovers to comic panels, was broadcast on dTV on August 1, 2016. The movie comic's theme song is "Nanairo Holiday" by Sky-Hi. A second movie comic was broadcast on March 20, 2019, to promote the second season of the live-action television series and featured "Snow Gift" by Tsubasa Sakiyama as the theme song.

=== Television drama ===
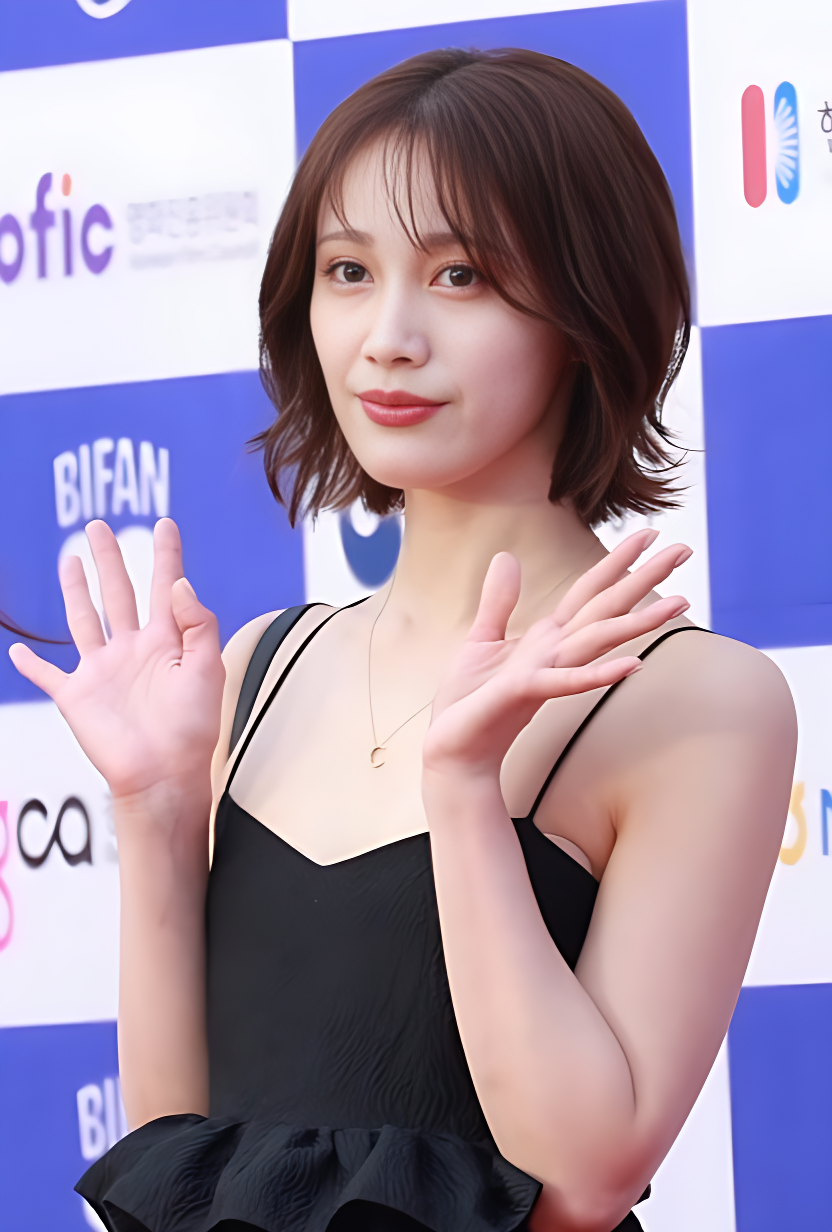
Yurika Nakamura (pictured in 2024) starred in the live-action television drama adaptation.

A live-action television series adaptation was announced in September 2017. The series stars Yurika Nakamura as Kumi, Yosuke Sugino as Hyō, Shouma Kai as Tatsuki, Bullet Train member Takashi Matsuo as Chihaya, and AKB48 member Anna Iriyama as Kanna. The television series was directed by Kentaro Otani and Ryō Miyawaki, with Miyako Matsumoto writing the script. The theme song for the series is "Waruguchi" by Da-ice. It was streamed exclusively on dTV and Fuji TV On Demand from October 30, 2017, to January 1, 2018. The series was later re-broadcast on Fuji TV's main television channel from April 24, 2018, to June 26, 2018.

A sequel titled Hana ni Kedamono: Second Season was released in 2019. The theme song is "Isshun no Onegai" by Da-ice.

==== Season 1 (2017) ====
No. overall	No. in season	Title	Directed by	Written by	Original release date
1	1	"A Kiss Where We Can't Go Back to Being Friends"; Transliteration: "Tomodachi ni Modorenai Kisu" (Japanese: 友達に戻れないキス)	Kentaro Otani	Miyako Matsumoto	October 30, 2017
2	2	"I Don't Want to Say I'm in "Love""; Transliteration: ""Suki" tte Iitakunai" (Japanese: 「好き」って言いたくない)	Kentaro Otani	Miyako Matsumoto	November 6, 2017
3	3	"A Substitute for Love"; Transliteration: "Koi no Migawari" (Japanese: 恋のみがわり)	Kentaro Otani	Miyako Matsumoto	November 13, 2017
4	4	"An Excuse for Love, Lies, and Tears"; Transliteration: "Koi to Uso to Namida no Wake" (Japanese: 恋と嘘と涙のわけ)	Kentaro Otani	Miyako Matsumoto	November 20, 2017
5	5	"A "Love" I Can't Hold Back"; Transliteration: "Osae Kirenai, "Suki"" (Japanese: 抑えきれない、『好き』)	Kentaro Otani	Miyako Matsumoto	November 27, 2017
6	6	"A Secret Between Friends"; Transliteration: "Tomodachi no Himitsu" (Japanese: ともだちのヒミツ)	Ryō Miyawaki	Miyako Matsumoto	December 4, 2017
7	7	"I Won't Fall in Love Anymore"; Transliteration: "Mou Koi wa Shinai" (Japanese: もう恋はしない)	Kentaro Otani	Miyako Matsumoto	December 11, 2017
8	8	"Fall in Love and Run"; Transliteration: "Koi o Kakete Hashiru" (Japanese: 恋をかけて走る)	Kentaro Otani	Miyako Matsumoto	December 18, 2017
9	9	"None of My Business, But it is My Business"; Transliteration: "Kankei nai, Kankei naku nai" (Japanese: 関係ない、関係なくない)	Kentaro Otani	Miyako Matsumoto	December 25, 2018
10	10	"I'm Glad I Fell in Love"; Transliteration: "Watashi, Koi o Shite Yokatta" (Japanese: 私、恋をしてよかった)	Kentaro Otani	Miyako Matsumoto	January 1, 2018

==== Season 2 (2019) ====
No. overall	No. in season	Title	Directed by	Written by	Original release date
11	1	"I Want to Be Closer Because I Love You"; Transliteration: "Suki dakara, Chikazuku ni Itai" (Japanese: 好きだから、近くにいたい)	Kentaro Otani	Miyako Matsumoto	March 23, 2019
12	2	"I Have to Say it! But, I Can't"; Transliteration: "Iwanakya! Demo, Ienai" (Japanese: 言わなきゃ！でも、言えない)	Kentaro Otani	Miyako Matsumoto	March 30, 2019
13	3	"The Meaning of Being Together"; Transliteration: "Issho ni Iru Imi" (Japanese: 一緒にいる意味)	Kentaro Otani	Miyako Matsumoto	April 6, 2019
14	4	"I Want Us to Talk One More Time"; Transliteration: "Mou Ichido, Atte Hanashitai" (Japanese: もう一度、会って話したい)	Kentaro Otani	Miyako Matsumoto	April 13, 2019
15	5	"The One I Love Forever and Ever"; Transliteration: "Kitto, Zutto, Daisuki na Hito" (Japanese: きっと、ずっと、大好きな人)	Kentaro Otani	Miyako Matsumoto	April 20, 2019

== Reception ==
In Japan, the manga sold a cumulative total of 2 million physical copies by 2017. Volume 5 debuted at #16 on Oricon and sold 42,634 copies in its first week. Volume 8 debuted at #21 on Oricon and sold 41,320 copies in its first week.

== See also ==
- Bite Maker: The King's Omega, another manga series by the same creator
