= Scams (TV series) =

2019 Japanese-language television series

- Genre: Drama
- Starring: Yosuke Sugino; Tomoya Maeno; Maika Yamamoto; Junki Tozuka; Shōdai Fukuyama; Naomi Nishida; Tetta Sugimoto; Ryohei Otani
- Country of origin: Japan
- Original language: Japanese
- No. of seasons: 1
- No. of episodes: 9

Original release
- Network: MBS
- Release: June 30 – August 25, 2019

Scams is a 2019 Japanese-language TV series starring Yosuke Sugino and Tomoya Maeno.

== Cast ==
- Yosuke Sugino as Seijitsu Kusano
- Tomoya Maeno as Soichi Seimiya
- Maika Yamamoto as Misaki Azuma
- Junki Tozuka as Shotaro Tanaka
- Shōdai Fukuyama as Tatsuya Kurusu
- Ron Mizuma as Yohei Mori
- Takuya Wakabayashi as Taku Goriki
- Asuka Hanamura as Hana Tsujihime
- Shuntarō Yanagi as Onuma
- Takashi Yamanaka as Ryo Yamada
- Masato Wada as Kaoru Dokukawa
- Naomi Nishida as Sachiko Kusano
- Tetta Sugimoto as Tojo
- Ryohei Otani as Kobe Itsu

== Release ==
Scams was released on June 30, 2019 on MBS.
