= L DK =

Japanese manga series

- Cover of the first manga volume of L DK
- Genre: Romance
- Manga
- Written by: Ayu Watanabe
- Published by: Kodansha
- English publisher: NA: Kodansha USA
- Magazine: Bessatsu Friend
- Original run: February 13, 2009 – August 12, 2017
- Volumes: 24
- Live-action film
- Directed by: Yasuhiro Kawamura
- Written by: Yuuko Matsuda
- Released: April 12, 2014
- Runtime: 113 minutes
- Live-action film

LDK Hitotsu Yane no Shita, "Suki" ga Futatsu
- Directed by: Taisuke Kawamura
- Written by: Michiru Egashira
- Music by: Kōji Endō
- Released: March 21, 2019
- Manga

LDK Pink
- Written by: Ayu Watanabe
- Published by: Kodansha
- Magazine: Bessatsu Friend
- Original run: February 12, 2022 – present

L DK, stylized as L♥DK, (Note: Pronunciation subtitle: エルディーケー (Eru Dī Kē) The title is a wordplay of the acronym "Living room, Dining room, Kitchen" and the phrase "love dōkyo" (cohabitance) (ラブ同居, rabu dōkyo).) is a Japanese manga by Ayu Watanabe that has been serialized the manga magazine Bessatsu Friend since 2009. It has been adapted into a live-action film that was released in 2014.

The story tells about the relationship between a high school girl, Aoi Nishimori, and the school prince, Shūsei Kugayama, when they come to share a small apartment. The series volumes have appeared on the Oricon comic charts a few times, and adapted into a Drama CD with the eighth volume of the manga.

== Plot ==
Shūsei Kugayama, the "Prince" of his high school, has a reputation of turning down confessions from admiring girls. Aoi Nishimori takes offense after he rejected the confession her best friend, Moe Shibuya. Later that day, Aoi is greeted by her new apartment neighbor which turns out to be Shūsei. After a kitchen fire accident ruins Shūsei's apartment, Shūsei decides to move into Aoi's flat, but becomes more casual and friendly towards her at school. Upon getting to know Shūsei better, Aoi falls in love with him, who initially did not return that feeling. Meanwhile, they must keep their cohabitation a secret. Aoi tries to confront the girls who are interested in Shūsei, the boys who are interested in her, and family members who reveal hints about Shūsei's past. Aoi and Shūsei eventually come to fall in love with one another.

== Characters ==
=== Main characters ===
Aoi Nishimori (西森 葵, Nishimori Aoi)
Aoi is a 16-year-old high school girl who lives in her own apartment after refusing to move away with her parents. She is described as impulsive, but is inexperienced with love. She has no reservations in confronting the school prince Shūsei Kugayama over her best friend Moe 's confession rejection, but is surprised when Shūsei becomes her new next-door neighbor. She is a capable cook, however, because of Shūsei's presence, she becomes careless and a fire erupts in his kitchen. After Shūsei moves in with her,^{Ch. 1} Aoi is shocked that he is so casual and friendly towards her at home and at school,^{Ch. 2} but soon develops feelings for him,^{Ch. 3} and becomes sensitive to other girls who express interest in him.^{Ch. 4} In the live-action films, she is portrayed by Ayame Goriki, and by Mone Kamishiraishi in the sequel.
Shūsei Kugayama (久我山 柊聖, Kugayama Shūsei)
Shusei is regarded as the school prince, even though he has a habit of turning down the girls' confessions in a rude manner.^{Ch. 1} He becomes Aoi's next-door neighbor in the apartments, but moves to her apartment after a kitchen fire causes the sprinklers to drench his place.^{Ch. 1} Shūseilikes to tease Aoi by acting casual at home, by visiting her class,^{Ch. 2} by making randomly inappropriate remarks about Aoi's undergarments^{Ch. 6} and by pulling practical jokes.^{Ch. 13} Despite that, he is protective of Aoi.^{Ch. 4} His past relationship with Satsuki Mizuno had affected how he behaves towards women, but he warms up to Aoi and eventually appreciates her love.^{Ch. 30} Media articles from Animate.tv and Animeanime.jp describe him as being tsundere. In the live-action films, Shūsei is portrayed by Kento Yamazaki and Yosuke Sugino in the sequel.

=== Supporting characters ===
Moe Shibuya (渋谷 萌, Shibuya Moe)
Moe is Aoi's best friend.^{Ch. 1} A week prior to the start of the story, she confesses to Shūsei but is turned down.^{Ch. 1} She easily reads that Aoi has fallen in love with Shūsei, but Aoi has denied it.^{Ch. 2-3} Moe is portrayed by Rei Okamoto in the first film and Sara Takatsuki in the sequel.
The landlady
Moe is the landlady of Aoi and Shūsei's apartment who is a widowed mother with her son, Kota.^{Ch. 4} She is interested in Wataru Sanjo. Moe is later revealed to be a former delinquent and had ridden a Harley with her husband.^{Ch. 19-20} Her name is not given in the manga, but in the live-action film, she is named Kazumi Hoshino (星野カズミ, Hoshino Kazumi) and portrayed by Miho Shiraishi.
Eri Kugayama (久我山 絵里, Kugayama Eri)
Eri is Shūsei's older sister suspicious of his relationship with Aoi, as they have not acted like a couple. She insists that Shūsei stays with her, but later lets them be.^{Ch. 4-5}
Shōta Komine (小嶺 翔太, Komine Shōta)
Shōta is a student who is than Aoi and Shūsei. Aoi describes him as a pretty boy.^{Ch. 7} He shows an interest in Aoi after having a friendly encounter with her in the cultural festival the previous year, and tries to woo her after seeing her again, which makes Aoi uncomfortable and Shūsei jealous.^{Ch. 7-8} He and Shūsei were on the basketball team together in middle school.^{Ch. 7}
Sōju Kugayama (久我山 草樹, Kugayama Sōju)
Sōju is Shūsei's older brother who works as a photo-journalist. He talks to Aoi about her relationship with Shūsei and gives her some advice. After Aoi failed to kiss Shūsei, Sōju demonstrates with his own kiss on her,^{Ch. 11} and then gets Aoi to act affectionate with him in order to make Shūsei jealous when he visits.^{Ch. 12} He is engaged to Satsuki,^{Ch. 8} but their marriage registration is later called off.^{Ch. 27-28} Sōju is portrayed by Seiji Fukushi and Keita Machida.
Satsuki Mizuno (水野桜月, Mizuno Satsuki)
Satsuki is Shūsei's childhood friend in middle school who was a member of the basketball club. She was in relationship with Shūsei, but they broke up.^{Ch. 5-8} Satsuki appears in the story as the fiancée to Shūsei's older brother, Sōju.^{Ch. 8} After the marriage registration was postponed, she gets her own apartment and tries to cling onto Shūsei.^{Ch. 27-29} She is portrayed by Anna Ishibashi in the live-action film.
Wataru Sanjo (三條亙, Sanjō Wataru)
Wataru enters the story as a new tenant in the apartments.^{Ch. 18} He likes Aoi due to her smile at the sports festival last year.^{Ch. 18} Once Aoi got upset that Shūsei revealed the cohabitation secret to him, he comforts Aoi and promises to keep it secret unless Shūsei makes her unhappy.^{Ch. 19} After Shusei leaves, he confesses to Aoi and offers to support her emotionally.^{Ch. 22-23} After realizing that Aoi is always going to put Shūsei first in her heart, he lets go.^{Ch. 29} He has three older sisters and his parents are overseas in China.^{Ch. 19, 28} In the live-action film, he works at a nearby food accessories store. He is portrayed by Renn Kiriyama.
Ryōsuke Sato (佐藤亮介, Satō Ryōsuke)
Ryōsuke is Shūsei's close friend, a high school senior, and a character exclusive to the live-action film. He ends up dating Moe. Ryōsuke is portrayed by Akiyoshi Nakao and Kazuki Horike. In an interview, Nakao said that he promises to do his best to play the character without any awkwardness.
Aoi's father (葵の父, Aoi no chichi)
Aoi's father visits and learns about Aoi and Shusei's cohabitation. He tries to pull Aoi out of school.^{Ch. 32-33} He is a former bodybuilder that Aoi calls a "muscle narcissist".^{Ch. 32-34} When Aoi gets into trouble at the park, he tries to save her but has got too old to handle the delinquents.^{Ch. 35} After Aoi is rescued by Shūsei, she declares her desire to protect Shūsei as he protected her and her father agrees to let them live together under the condition they stay together but not have sex.^{Ch. 35}

== Media ==
=== Manga ===
The manga is written by manga artist Ayu Watanabe. The chapters have been appearing monthly in Kodansha's shojo manga magazine, Bessatsu Friend, since 2009. A drama CD was bundled with the release of volume 8 of the manga. The series concluded in the September 2017 issue. A two-chapter bonus manga was released in the magazine's October–November 2017 issue, digitally published as Volume 25. The manga series was packaged into 24 volumes. Volume 25 is a bonus chapter.

A sequel manga titled LDK Pink began serialization in Bessatsu Friend on February 12, 2022.

==== Volumes ====
No.	Title	Original release date	English release date
1	Living, Dining, Kitchen... Love?	June 12, 2009; 978-4063416251	October 20, 2015; 978-1632361226
1. The Prince's Neighbor (王子の隣人, Ōji no Rinjin); 2. Cohabitation Starts (同居スタート, Dōkyo Sutāto); 3. True Feelings (ホントの気持ち, Honto no Kimochi); 4. A Day Off Together (一緒の休日, Issho ni Kyūjitsu)
High school student Aoi Nishimori scolds the school prince Shusei Kugayama for rejecting the confession of her friend, Moe Shibuya, in a rude manner. Later, she discovers her new next-door neighbor is Shusei! After she makes him a meal and later fends off some stalker girls, she starts to cook but then the stove catches on fire and sets off the apartment sprinklers. Shūsei decides he will move in with Aoi. He starts casually hanging out at home and visiting Aoi at school. Shūsei walks in on Aoi's bath when Moe visits, so Aoi scrambles to hide his presence. Aoi sets up a curtain in the room, but later that night she hears that Shūsei is making out with a girl, but it turns out to be a practical joke by Moe and Shūsei. Aoi and Shusei spend a day handcuffed together.
2	Love Rivals	November 13, 2009; 978-4063416503	December 25, 2015; 978-1632361233
5. The Lovers' Apartment (恋人たちの部屋, Koibito-tachi no Heya); 6. Closest (いちばん近く, Ichiban Chikaku); 7. Your Pet (きみのペット, Kimi no Petto); 8. Realized Feelings (気づいた想い, Kizuita Omoi)
Shusei's sister Eri Kugayama visits, but is suspicious that Aoi and Shusei are lovers. She stays over to see if they are for real. Aoi prepares for a basketball game but on the day of the event, Aoi discovers she is wearing his T-shirt. Aoi meets a pretty boy Shōta Komine is interested in her, especially after seeing her at a dog park with Shūsei. When Shūsei moves back to his apartment, Shōta tries to move into Aoi's. When they go grocery-shopping, they meet Shūsei's ex-girlfriend Satsuki Mizuno who is engaged to Shūsei's brother. Aoi becomes worried that Shūsei is missing school, and takes drastic measures.
3	Oh, Brother	March 12, 2010; 978-4063416725	February 23, 2016; 978-1632361325
9. Bittersweet (甘くて苦い, Amakute Nigai); 10. To the Northern Country (北の国へ, Kita no Kuni e); 11. Where Lips Go (唇のゆくえ, Kuchibiru no Yukue); 12. Liar (うそつき, Usotsuki)
Shūsei's friends visit Aoi's apartment so Aoi has to hide. On their school field trip, busty language teacher Naomi Aota falls all over Shūsei, which leaves Aoi with very little time with him. Shūsei's older brother Soju visits and gives Aoi some advice on improving her chances with Shūsei with a kiss, but when the kiss situations fail, Soju proceeds to give her a kiss firsthand and plans to try to make Shūsei jealous by visiting him and being affectionate with Aoi. He later surprises Shūsei with a picture of his kiss with Aoi.
4	Summer Heat	July 13, 2010; 978-4063416947	April 19, 2016; 978-1632361578
13. Unforgivable (許されないこと, Yurusarenai koto); 14. Body and Soul (心と体, Kokoro to Karada; lit. 'Heart and Body'); 15. Momo-colored Crush (桃色片想い, Momoiro Kataomoi; lit. 'Pink One-sided Love'); 16. Night of Fireworks (花火の夜, Hanabi no Yoru)
Soju shows Shūsei the photo where he kisses Aoi, but Shūsei is not bothered. Aoi apologizes to Shūsei for her behavior. She learns about the photo and decks Soju for manipulating her, after which Shūsei tells her to forget that kiss. Aoi's female friends talk about what about fetishes about men's bodies that turn them on. Aoi gets nervous when Shūsei tutors her and exhibits all of the above. Shūsei's little cousin Momo visits and wants Shūsei's affections at the water-park. Aoi and Shūsei plan to attend to the fireworks festival when Aoi's brother Kento approach them, then all of them go together.
5	Boy Next Door	December 13, 2010; 978-4063417258	June 14, 2016; 978-1632361585
17. Mean...? (イジワル...?, Ijiwaru...?); 18. Spinning Your Wheels (空回り, Karamawari); 19. Night of Rejection (拒まれた夜, Kobamareta Yoru); 20. A Mix-up of Men and Women (男女の過ち, Danjo no Ayamachi)
Aoi and Shūsei take Kouta to the amusement park. However, when Kouta asks about their living situation, Shusei's response causes Kouta to turn cold towards him. Wataru Sanjo, a new neighbor, befriends Aoi. Although she tries to hide her cohabitation situation, Shūsei does the opposite and tells him. Wataru tries to comfort Aoi and promises to keep the cohabitation a secret, however he begins to show interest in Aoi. During Wataru's welcome party, Aoi accidentally consumes alcohol and wants Shūsei to do whatever he wants with her, but Shūsei takes offense. Later, she ends up in the men's baths with Wataru, who tells Shūsei that if he is the cause of her sadness, he will take Aoi for himself.
6	Three's a Crowd	April 13, 2011; 978-4063417418	August 23, 2016; 978-1632361592
21. The North Wind and the Sun (北風と太陽, Kitakaze to Taiyō); 22. Can't Go Back To How Things Were (戻れない関係, Modorenai Kankei); 23. Gentle Hands (優しい手, Yasashii Te); 24. Fighting Hosts (戦うホスト, Tatakau Hosuto); Bonus chapter: Special Sexy Bonus Story (SPセクシー番外編)
The landlady holds a cooking class-gathering with Aoi and Wataru. After learning that they are together, Shūsei acts cold and aggressive to Aoi in a sexual way, but when Aoi starts to cry, he decides he will leave. Aoi chases him and confesses, but he does not reciprocate her feelings. Wataru comforts her and offers his own confession. Aoi tries to move on with her life but cannot. When she hears Shūsei has been staying at Eri's, she visits, but sees Shūsei with Satsuki. At the preparations for the school culture festival, Wataru practices his host club lines on Aoi, who breaks down and cries over Shūsei. Wataru confronts Shūsei again, but Shūsei gets angry and tells him he does not know anything. In the bonus chapter, Eri shows Aoi how to hypnotize Shūsei.
7	Rebound Time	August 11, 2011; 978-4063417531	October 18, 2016; 978-1632361608
25. The Snow Woman & The Queen (雪女と女王様, Yuki-onna to Joō-sama); 26. Naughty Lips (やんちゃな唇, Yancha-na Kuchibiru); 27. The Three Who Pass Each Other (すれ違う3人, Surechigau 3-jin); 28. Night of Shooting Stars (流れ星の夜, Nagareboshi no Yoru)
On the day of the school festival, Eri chooses Wataru at the host club and asks about his background. Aoi takes a break but is brought to the host club as well. Afterwards, Wataru finds Aoi and wants to care for her more. Wataru's sisters find them and bring them over to their house. Wataru tries to kiss Aoi, but she deflects it and gets a hickey instead. She gets a call from Shusei, who is with Satsuki. As Aoi collapses from a cold, Shusei rushes to her place and cooks and cares for her. He reveals that Satsuki is not marrying Soju. Wataru and Aoi go stargazing, but the latter starts to tear up when he makes another move on her, so he backs out, knowing that Aoi still has feelings for Shusei.
8		December 13, 2011; 978-4063417753	December 27, 2016; 978-1632361615
29. Time's Up (時間切れ, Jikangire); 30. Confession (告白, Kokuhaku); 31. A Lover's Lips (恋人の唇, Koibito no Kuchibiru); 32. Nice To Meet You?! (ナイス・トゥー・ミーチュー！？, Naisu To~ū Mīchū?!)
Satsuki invites Aoi to her place and brags about living with Shusei. Afterwards, Aoi receives a call from Shusei but Wataru interrupts and says that time is up and that he is claiming Aoi for himself. Shusei rushes over and decks Wataru. He takes Aoi to his elementary school where he shares his past: his first girlfriend, Yuzuha, whom he helped a lot in basketball, died afterwards; he dated Satsuki just to forget, and she eventually went to be with Soju. Shusei does not think he could love again until he meets Aoi, and becomes jealous of Wataru. When he confesses, Aoi slaps him but replies that it is okay to remember Yuzuha; they become a couple. He later teases Aoi as usual but takes her to a pedestrian overpass where they kiss. When Aoi's father visits, Aoi has Shusei pretend to be her teacher when they meet, but Shusei eventually reveals that he is living with her.
9	Father Knows Best?	April 13, 2012; 978-4063417753	March 14, 2017; 978-1632361622
33. Naked Couple (裸の2人, Hadaka 2-jin); 34. Daddy's Smile (父がくれた笑顔, Chichi ga Kureta Egao); 35. What You Want to Protect (守りたいもの, Mamoritai no); 36. Adult Time (オトナの時間, Otona no Jikan); Special Edition for the Drama CD: On-Site Recording Report
Furious about the cohabitation, Aoi's father plans to have her transfer schools. Shusei surprises him at the bathhouse; they talk until Shusei passes out at the sauna. At home, Aoi's father finds a stash of condoms. Shusei learns about Aoi's relationship with her father, that she had been lonely and her father used to bail her out of dangerous situations. He tells Aoi they should stop living together. Aoi steps out to a park when some delinquents harass her. When Aoi's father fails to stop them, Shusei gets involved. Aoi says that she has someone to protect like her father has protected her all these years. Aoi's father relents and lets them live together through graduation on the condition that they stay together and that they do not have sex. The landlady holds a party at the water park for Wataru's acceptance into university. Eri talks with Wataru about relationships. Aoi and Shusei spend the night, but they stick with just kissing, even though it is difficult to restrain themselves from wanting more.
10	From Roommates to Classmates	August 11, 2012; 978-4063418125	July 11, 2017; 978-1632361639
37. Learning Together (同級生, Dōkyūsei); 38. After School (放課後, Hōkago); 39. Shared Interest (共通点, Kyōtsū-ten); 40. Surprise (サプライズ, Sapuraisu)
Aoi and Shusei become classmates in the new school year and meet Haru Onoo and Kaede Igarashi. The classmates go bowling and eat out. Aoi feels isolated, but Shusei sits next to her and holds her hand. Shusei invites Aoi to a uniform date (Note: A uniform date is a date where they are still wearing their school uniforms.) They go to another district but encounter Kaede, who asks if they are dating. When Aoi dodges the question, Kaede takes Shusei on a date, but Aoi follows and eventually pulls Shusei away. The couple go to a photo booth. Aoi and Haru go grocery-shopping and discover their similarities. After Shusei and Yuudai arrive, they have a party; Shusei plays one-on-one basketball with Haru.
11		December 13, 2012; 9784063418316	June 26, 2018; 9781632361646
41. Forbidden Confession (禁じられた告白, Kinjirareta Kokuhaku); 42. Overlapping Lips (重ねあわされた唇, Kasane-awasareta Kuchibiru); 43. Wounds and Bonds (傷とキズナ, Kizu to Kizuna); 44. The Girl Who Lost (負けた女, Maketa Onna)
Kaede finds Shusei and Aoi's purikura in the room and becomes suspicious. She eventually discovers the truth about their relationship and demands Aoi keeps it a secret from Haru. During a study session at Yuudai's place, a misunderstanding between Shusei and Aoi is born. Shusei and Haru are chosen for the relay during the Sports Festival; after practicing together, Haru decides to confess to Shusei. During the festival, Aoi tells Haru about her relationship with Shusei. The two then make a bet.
12	Close Contact	May 13, 2013; 9784063418590	November 13, 2018; 9781632361653
45. Night of Punishment (オシオキの夜, Oshioki no Yoru); 46. A Face Never Seen Before (見たことない顔, Mitakotonai Kao); 47. Hot Body (熱いカラダ, Atsui Karada); 48. First Milestone (はじめての記念日, Hajimete no Kinenbi; lit. 'First Anniversary')
13	Safe Haven	September 13, 2013; 9784063418767	August 27, 2019; 9781632361660
49. An Adult Lovey-Dovey Cohabitation (オトナのラブ・同居, Otona no Rabu Dōkyo); 50. Home Visit (家庭訪問, Katei Hōmon); 51. First Summer (はじめての夏, Hajimete no Natsu); 52. Big Bro (兄, Ani)
14	Lovey-Dovey Drama	February 13, 2014; 978-4-06-341902-3	December 3, 2019; 9781632361677
This volume covers chapters 53–56.: 53. Little Brother (弟, Ototo); 54. Obsession in Tricolore (トリコロールに萌えて, ōni Moete); 55. Super Adult Lovey-Dovey Cohabitation (超オトナのラブ・同居, Chō Otona no Rabu Dōkyo); 56. Super Adult Lovey-Dovey Cohabitation 2 (超オトナのラブ・同居2, Chō Otona no Rabu Dōkyo 2); Bonus chapter: Your Prisoner of Love (【描き下ろしｼｮｰﾄ】君のトリコ, Egakishiroshi Shōto Kimi no Toriko)
15	Summer Love Burns Hot	June 13, 2014; 978-4-06-341923-8	May 5, 2020; 9781632361684
This volume covers chapters 57–60.: 57. Wall Fantasista (壁ぎわのファンタシスタ, Kabegiwa no Fantashisuta); 58. Double Date (Wデート, W Dēto); 59. Wonderfall! (ワンダふる!, Wandafuru!); 60. And Then You're a Dad (そしてパパになる, Soshite Papa ni naru)
16	An American Dream	November 13, 2014; 978-4-06-341951-1	July 20, 2021; 9781632361691
This volume covers chapters 61–64.: 61. You're So Raspberry (君はラズベリー, Razuberī); 62. Shu's Girl (シュウの女, Shuu no Onna); 63. W-E-L-C-O-M-E (オ・モ・テ・ナ・シ, O-mo-te-na-shi; lit. 'H-o-s-t-i-n-g'); 64. From Good Morning to Good Night (おはようからおやすみまで, Ohayō kara Oyasumi made)
17		March 13, 2015; 978-4-06-341972-6	December 28, 2021; 9781646511167
This volume covers chapters 65–68.: 65. Unshaking Woman (揺れない女, Yurenai Onna); 66. Baring My All (ハダカの俺, Hadaka no Ore); 67. Blurring the Boundary (越えた一線, Koeta Issen); 68. What Score Can She Get?
18		July 13, 2015; 978-4-06-341992-4	December 28, 2021; 9781646511167
This volume covers chapters 69–72.: 69. A Difference of 1 Point (1点の差, 1-ten no Sa); 70. Winner and Loser (勝者と敗者, Shōsha to Haisha); 71. The Man Called Lightning (稲妻と呼ばれた男, Inazuma to Yobareta Otoko); 72. Secret Night (シークレットナイト, Shīkuretto Naito)
19		December 11, 2015; 978-4-06-392022-2	May 2, 2023; 9781646511181
This volume covers chapters 73–76.: 73. You've Got It, Shusei (柊聖 おまえにはそれがある, Shusei, Omae ni wa Sore ga aru); 74. I'll Change Her Mind (おまえの心を変えてやる, Omae no Kokoro o Kawaeteyaru); 75. He Took Her Hand (奪われた彼女の手, Ubawareta Kanojo no Te; lit. 'Her Stolen Hand'); 76. No Pain, No Gain
20	Eternal Dream/Suggestion Love/I Still Like It/The Hero's True Sound; Reien no Yume/Sugesuki/Soredemo Suki/Hīrō no (玲苑の夢/すげー好き/それでも好き/ヒーローの本音)	April 13, 2016; 978-4-06-392037-6	May 2, 2023; 9781646511181
This volume covers chapters 77-80.
21	Things I Can Say and Things I Can't Say/Encounter with.../Hands Clasped Hands/The Protector; Ieru koto to Ienai koto/... to no Sōgū/Tsunai Date/Mamoru Otoko (言えることと言えないこと/○○○との遭遇/つないだ手/守る男)	August 12, 2016; 978-4-06-392056-7	October 17, 2023; 9781646511204
This volume covers chapters 81-84.
22	Journey Day/The Woman Who Makes Her Decisions/The Adult Way/My Brother's True Feelings; Tabidachi no Hi/Misadameru Onna/Otona no Ryūgi/Ani no Honne (旅立ちの日/見定める女/オトナの流儀/兄のホンネ)	December 13, 2016; 978-4-06-392092-5	October 17, 2023; 9781646511204
This volume covers chapters 85-88.
23	The Days We Fall Apart/For the Sake of the Future/An Unforgettable Christmas/What Was Missing? Hanareta Hibi wa/Mirai no Tame ni/Wasurerarenai Kurisumasu/Kakete-ita koto (離れた日々は/未来のために/忘れられないクリスマス/欠けていたこと)	May 12, 2017; 978-4-06-392115-1	November 7, 2023; 9781646511228
This volume covers chapters 89-92.
24	The Days We Fall Apart/For the Sake of the Future/An Unforgettable Christmas/What Was Missing? Hanareta Hibi wa/Mirai no Tame ni/Wasurerarenai Kurisumasu/Kakete-ita koto (離れた日々は/未来のために/忘れられないクリスマス/欠けていたこと)	October 13, 2017; 978-4-06-392133-5	November 7, 2023; 9781646511228
This volume covers chapters 93-96.

=== Light Novels ===
The series has been adapted into two light novels, written from the perspective of Shusei. The novels were written by Ran Satomi.

=== Films ===
A live-action film adaptation was announced on May 9, 2013, and was released on April 12, 2014. The film starred Ayame Goriki as Aoi and Kento Yamazaki as Shusei. This is Goriki's first solo lead role in a romance film. The film was directed by Yasuhiro Kawamura and written by Yuko Matsuda. Filming took place in July 2013 and at the Cosmo World amusement park in Kanagawa. Goriki, who has had short hair for the past three years, wore a wig when she played Aoi.

A film adaptation sequel was released on March 21, 2019, under the title LDK: Hitotsu no Yane no Shita, "Suki" ga Futatsu (L♥DK ひとつ屋根の下、『スキ』がふたつ。, LDK: Two Loves Under One Roof). The film stars Mone Kamishiraishi as Aoi, Yosuke Sugino as Shusei, and Ryusei Yokohama as Shusei's cousin Reo, an original character.

== Reception ==
Rebecca Silverman from Anime News Network gave the first volume an overall B grade, citing its strengths in using standard romance tropes without using the "less charming" aspects.

LDK has sold over 2.7 million copies in its first 12 volumes, and was listed as a top seller for January 2013 e-book downloads for NTT DoCoMo. It ranked first in the Shojo Manga category for the 2013 E-Book Award in the magazine Da Vinci. The series was nominated for the 38th Kodansha Manga Award for Best Shojo Manga.

Oricon's Japanese Comic Ranking
Vol. no.	Peak rank	Notes and refs
9	12	
10	8	3 weeks
11	9	2 weeks
12	4	2 weeks
13	7	3 weeks
14	2	3 weeks
15	6	3 weeks
16	5	3 weeks
17	6	3 weeks
18	6	2 weeks
19	12	2 weeks
20	11	3 weeks
21		
22	13	2 weeks

For its opening weekend, the L DK live action film ranked fourth in gross and second among Japanese-produced films. The film grossed US$3,758,081 in Japan.

== Legacy ==
L DK was known for popularizing the kabedon move where Shūsei pins Aoi to a wall using his arm

== Notes ==
Specific

- "Ch." is shortened form for chapter and refers to a chapter number of the L DK manga
