= Kabedon =

Japanese sound symbolism

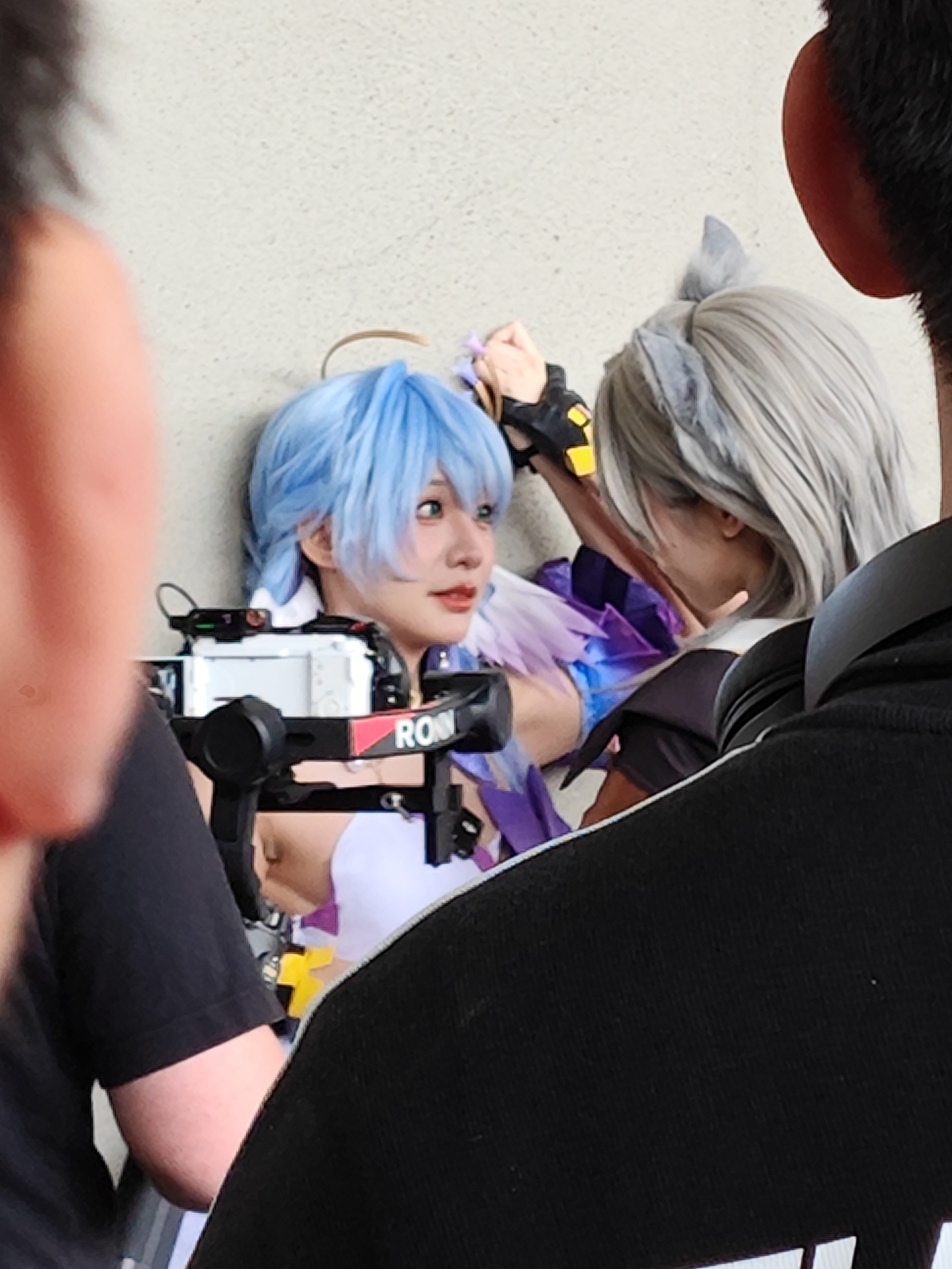
A pair of cosplayers who respectively cosplaying as Robin and Stelle from Honkai: Star Rail simulating the Kabedon scenario

Kabedon or kabe-don (Japanese: 壁ドン; kabe, "wall", and don, "bang") refers to the action of slapping a wall fiercely, which produces a loud sound, "don". One use of this phrase is to describe the action of slapping a wall as a protest in collective housing, such as condominiums, when the neighboring unit makes too much noise. Another use often appears in shōjo manga or anime when one character forces another against the wall with one hand or leans against the wall, making the "don" sound. This has become a popular tool to invoke the "clever move of confession" trope and for creating an intimate atmosphere.

== Origins ==
The term kabedon first appeared in 2008 when voice actor Ryōko Shintani described it as "lovely situation". It has been popularized in the shōjo manga L DK by author Ayu Watanabe; and in April 2014, the manga was adapted into a live-action film. Afterwards, the term started to become familiar to the public and has appeared in multiple shojo manga stories.

== Usage ==
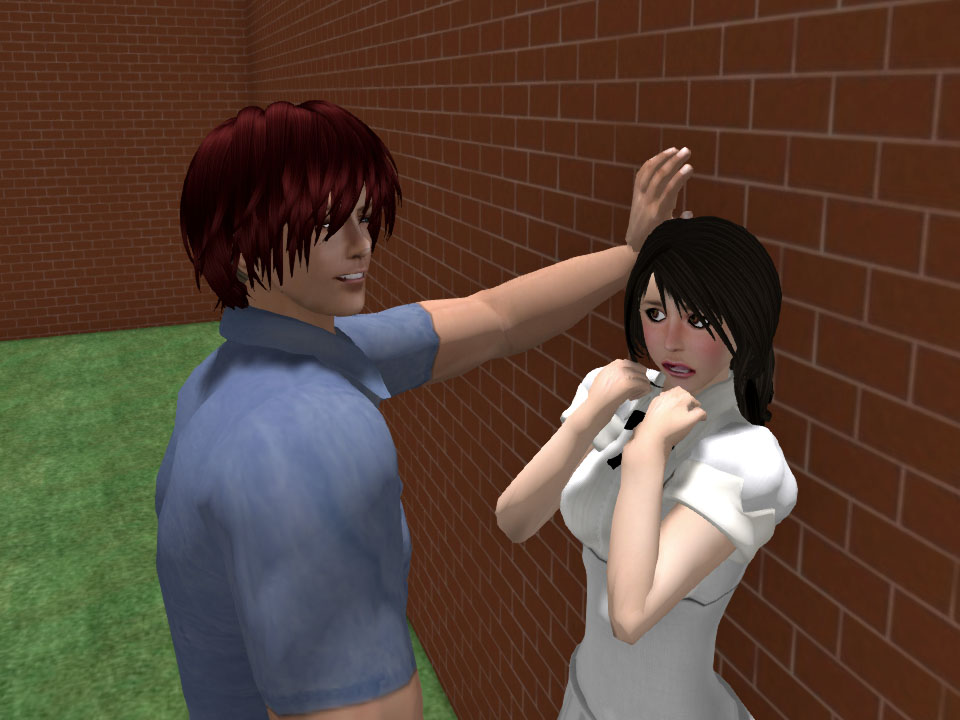
The Kabedon gesture as seen in anime and manga, demonstrated in Second Life

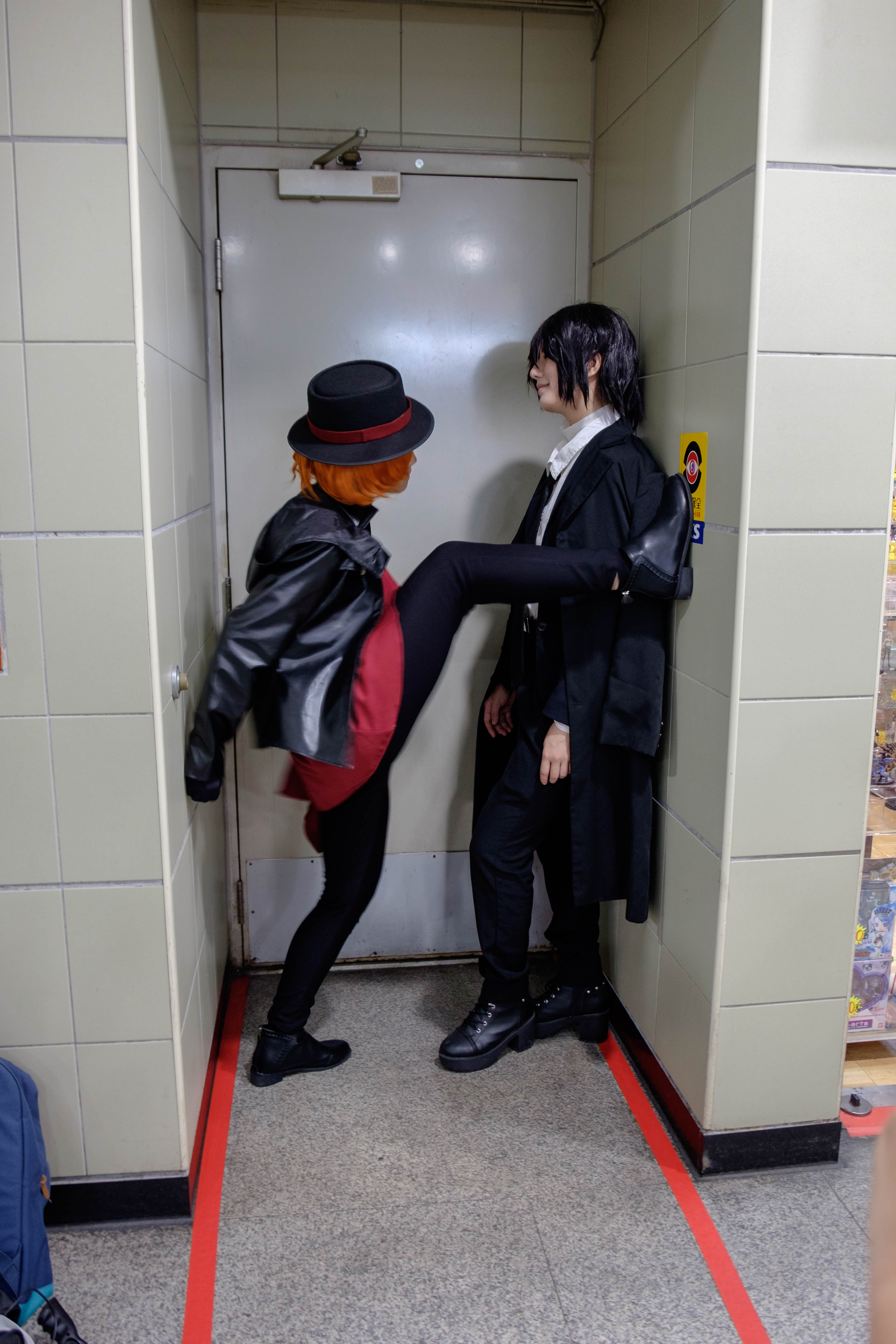
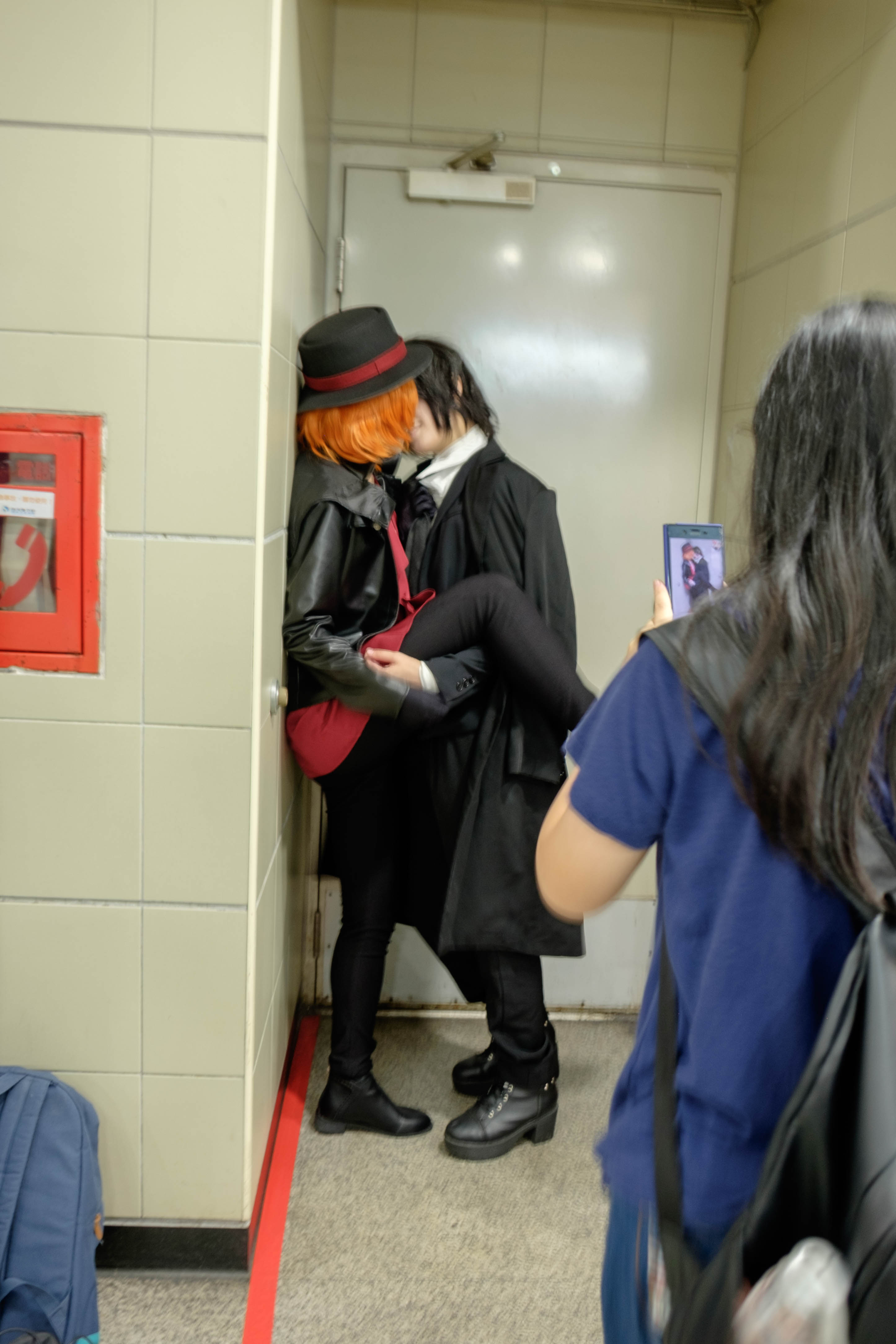
A sample of leg Kabedon (left) and Kabedon counter (right)

Kabedon typically appears in Shōjo manga or anime when a man corners the woman against the wall; at the same time, one or both of his hands slaps the wall on either side of the woman and the sound of "don" is produced.

In Japan, the walls of many accommodation buildings are thin and not insulated against sound. As such, simple actions like closing a door or turning on the television can easily be heard by neighbors. When this noise becomes too loud to bear, Japanese people tend to bang their connecting walls in protest.

The practice of kabedon was borrowed into Chinese with the pronunciation bidong (壁咚, bìdōng / bik^{1} dung^{1}) through television dramas like My Sunshine. In Hong Kong, the actor Gregory Wong performed the bidong in a commercial for Listerine mouthwash.

== See also ==
- Glossary of anime and manga
- Japanese sound symbolism
