= Yosuke Sugino =

Japanese actor and model (born 1995)

- 杉野 遥亮
- Born: September 18, 1995 (age 30); Chiba, Chiba Prefecture, Japan
- Occupations: Actor; model
- Years active: 2016–present
- Agent: Top Coat
- Height: 185 cm (6 ft 1 in)
- Website: www.topcoat.co.jp/artist/sugino-yosuke/

Yosuke Sugino (杉野 遥亮, Sugino Yōsuke; born September 18, 1995) is a Japanese actor and model. He is the winner of the 12th Fine Boys Model Audition Grand Prix.

== Filmography ==
=== Television ===
Year	Title	Role	Note	Ref(s)
2017	Ani ni Aisaresugite Komattemasu	Kunimitsu Serikawa		
2017	Tokyo Alice	Haruto Izumi		
2017	Hana ni Kedamono	Hyō Kakizono	Lead role	
2017	Good Morning Call: Our Campus Days	Natsume Hiiragi		
2017	Aoi Tori Nante	Kōichi Sekiya		
2018	Don't Forget Me	Shōta Ogawa		
2019	Hana ni Kedamono: Second Season	Hyō Kakizono	Lead role	
2019	Scams	Seijitsu Kusano / Makoto	Lead role	
2019	If Talking Paid	Kaisei Komano		
2020	Sabu	Eiji	Lead role; TV movie	
2021	Kyojo 2	Taichi Higa	Miniseries	
2021	Love's in Sight!	Morio Kurokawa		
2022	Riding a Unicorn	Kō Suzaki		
2023	What Will You Do, Ieyasu?	Sakakibara Yasumasa	Taiga drama	
2024	Isobe Isobē Monogatari	Isobē Isobe	Lead role	
2024	Okura: Cold Case Investigation	Toshiki Fuwa	Lead role	
2026	Song of the Samurai	Abiru Eizaburo		

=== Film ===
Year	Title	Role	Notes	Ref(s)
2017	Kiseki: Sobito of That Day	Sō		
2017	Ani ni Aisaresugite Komattemasu	Kunimitsu Serikawa		
2017	Anonymous Noise	Yoshito Haruno		
2018	Lenses on Her Heart	Takayuki Oyamada		
2018	That Girl's Captives of Love	Subaru Tōjō		
2018	Waiting for Spring	Ryuji Tada		
2019	L-DK: Two Loves, Under One Roof	Shusei Kugayama	Lead role	
2019	Iwane: Sword of Serenity	Shin'nosuke Kawade		
2019	My Girlfriend Is a Serial Killer	Etsuro Kurosu	Lead role	
2020	Flight on the Water	Sota Kaga		
2021	Tokyo Revengers	Naoto Tachibana		
2022	One Day, You Will Reach the Sea	Tōno		
2022	Violence Action	Terano		
2023	Tokyo Revengers 2: Bloody Halloween Part 1	Naoto Tachibana		
2023	Tokyo Revengers 2: Bloody Halloween Part 2	Naoto Tachibana		
2024	Tea for Three	Keiya Manaka		
2025	Strawberry Moon	Hinata Sato (adult)		
2026	Kyojo: Requiem	Taichi Higa		
