= List of Rin-ne episodes =

Cover art of the first DVD compilation released by Sentai Filmworks containing the first half of the first season.

Rin-ne is a Japanese anime television series, produced by Brain's Base and directed by Seiki Sugawara, based on the manga by Rumiko Takahashi. The first season aired 25 episodes from April 4 to September 20, 2015, and the second season is airing from April 9, 2016. The screenplay is written by Michiko Yokote and the music composed by Akimitsu Honma. For the first season, the first opening theme is "Ōkaranman" (桜花爛漫; "Riot of Cherry Blossoms") by Keytalk and the first ending theme is "Tokinowa" (トキノワ; "Ring of Time") by Passepied. From episodes 14 to 25, the second opening theme is "Ura no Ura" (裏の裏; "Back of the Back") by Passepied and the second ending theme is "Futatsu no Sekai" (ふたつの世界; "Two Worlds") by Quruli. For the second season, the first opening theme is "Melody" by Pile and the first ending theme is "Hanashi o Shiyō" (話をしよう; "Let's Talk") by Glim Spanky. From episode 38 to 50, the second opening theme is "Ainii" (アイニー) by CreepHyp and the second ending theme is "Beautiful Life" by Shiggy Jr. For the third season, the first opening theme is "Shiny" by Yoru no Honki Dance and the first ending theme is "Suki nano Kana" (スキナノカナ) by Softly.

== Series overview ==
Season	Episodes	Originally aired	
Season	Episodes	First aired	Last aired
1	25	April 4, 2015	September 20, 2015
2	25	April 9, 2016	September 24, 2016
3	25	April 8, 2017	September 23, 2017

== Episodes ==
=== Season 1 ===
No.	Title	Original release date
1	"The Mysterious Classmate"; Transliteration: "Nazo no Kurasumēto" (Japanese: 謎のクラスメート)	April 4, 2015
Ever since she was young, Sakura Mamiya has been capable of seeing ghosts, a feat which normal humans are unable to perform. However, after all these years she just wishes she'd lose this ability. One day, she meets Rinne Rokudō, a classmate who never shows up to school, but realises that no one else can see him, so she assumes him to be a ghost until he shows up the next day and everyone can see him. Approaching Rinne, he reveals himself to be a half-human-half-shinigami, and that he cannot be seen by ordinary humans while wearing a special robe called Haori of the Underworld, which unleashes his shinigami half. Rinne saves Sakura from two merged ghosts later that day, letting Sakura understand the importance of his job. Deciding to stay out of the way, Sakura distances herself from Rinne, which is easy considering Rinne hasn't showed up to school since that day, which he only did to fulfill attendance requirements. Sakura's friend Rika Momoi confides in her soon after about her receiving mysterious calls on her new cellphone. Overhearing, Rinne tells of a "rumour" to put an offering in the school's weather-box out in the courtyard, coupled with a note explaining the problem. There is actually no such legend and Rinne is just using it to extort food and money from students due to his poverty. Sakura ultimately manages to convince him to help Rika. Together, they find out that the calls are the doing of a spirit who had lost a school jacket and was rushing to take it back as a girl he liked had sown his name on it and it was something dear to him. On the way however, a flower pot fell on his head and he died instantly. Rinne returns the jacket and the spirit, thankful, rests in peace.
2	"The Memory of the Red Ring"; Transliteration: "Akai Wa no Kioku" (Japanese: 赤い輪の記憶)	April 11, 2015
Sakura and the rest of the students from the school get a warning from a masked woman in a kimono, telling them to make an offering in the weather-box or be cursed forever. Suspecting Rinne, Sakura questions him but Rinne seems to be innocent. The masked woman, revealed to be Rinne's grandmother, Tamako, arrives to retrieve the students' offerings and is followed by both Rinne and Sakura into the spirit world, where Rinne confronts his grandmother. Sakura, however, gets separated from Rinne and falls to a spirit temple festival, where she meets a suspicious pink rabbit that guides her to the Circle of Reincarnation, a magic red circle suspended in the sky that is where spirits go after they pass on to be reborn. Meanwhile, Tamako helps Rinne find Sakura on the Circle of Reincarnation, where Rinne promptly brings her back and defeat the pink bunny who threatens to stop them. Returning to Tamako's house, she warns Sakura from ever going on the Circle of Reincarnation because she is still a living person, in addition to stay away from creatures like the pink bunny, who are damashigami, shinigami who illegally steal living people to be reborn to fill up their spirit quota. As Rinne takes Sakura home, she remembers encountering the same rabbit on her first trip to the spirit world, where Tamako fed her some candy and allowed her subsequently to see spirits.
3	"The Clubhouse Phantom"; Transliteration: "Kurabu Tō no Kai" (Japanese: クラブ棟の怪)	April 18, 2015
Curious about his actual identity, Sakura learns from Rinne that his grandma Tamako married his human grandfather and granted him a longer lifespan. After a spiritual incident at an abandoned club building, she comes across a cat that turns out to be Rokumon, sent by Tamako to help her grandson in his shinigami duties. Sakura finds out that Rinne lives in the abandoned building because his grandpa died and that he has to take on his grandma's entire shinigami workload due to marrying and extending the lifespan of a human. The next day, another spiritual presence is felt around the building.
4	"If You Don't Mind Starting as Friends"; Transliteration: "Tomodachi Kara de Yokereba" (Japanese: 友だちからで良ければ)	April 25, 2015
Sakura's old elementary school classmate, Tsubasa Jumonji, transfers into her and Rinne's class and Sakura's friends Rika and Miho Aogiri immediately notice he has a crush on her. A flashback reveals that Tsubasa had a lonely childhood belonging to a family of exorcists, as he could see spirits and frequently moved, as such nobody but Sakura understood him or could see what he saw. He attempts to win her attention and is suspicious of Rinne's relationship with her. Things get worse when Rinne learns that Tsubasa kills off spirits instead of purifying them using a sacred expensive substance known as Holy Ash. To teach him a lesson that not all spirits are wicked, Rinne goes on a triple date with Tsubasa, Sakura and her friends, as well as a ghost who died in sickness and had a crush on Miho previously but never got the chance to talk to her. By the end of the date, Rinne is broke thanks to Rika and the ghost departs the world in peace.
5	"Hanako-san the Toilet Girl"; Transliteration: "Toire no Hanako-san" (Japanese: トイレの花子さん)	May 2, 2015
Rinne, after being broke from the triple date, espies a "Wanted" poster for a mega-sized spirit, the reward being 10,000 yen. Seizing this opportunity, he goes out to find it so that he can rebuy his scythe, which he had no choice to sell previously for living expenses and now costs 5000 yen at the pawnshop. Meanwhile, a spirit enters the school and begins vandalising the toilets and classrooms with mini handprints. The culprit is revealed to be Hanako, the spirit of a little girl who used to haunt the toilets in elementary school, but got driven out by Tsubasa and as such bears a grudge against him. Wishing to take revenge, she borrows power from a greater, more powerful evil spirit, but is ignorant of the fact that he is trying to gain her trust first before absorbing her into himself and becoming stronger. Recognising the evil spirit to be the one on the advertisement, Rinne manages to purify it and save Hanako when Tsubasa is unable to defeat it. After the skirmish, Tsubasa realises that Hanako only stayed in the toilet because that was her home, and he had driven her out for absolutely no reason, thus apologising to her and allowing her to rest in peace. Going to collect his reward, Rinne realises that someone else had already done so.
6	"Voice of the Roadside Shrine"; Transliteration: "Hokora no Koe" (Japanese: 祠の声)	May 9, 2015
Miho overhears a rumour about a roadside shrine filled with moaning voices from a woman on the street, so she asks Rika and Sakura to accompany her to take a look. The shrine appears broken and empty, but there are faint children screams of "Help!" inside that scare Rika and Miho away. Sakura, however, goes to consult Rinne, only to find another man doing so, accompanied by Tsubasa. The man requests Rinne's help as his younger brother Yoshi had begun to injure their faces and develop cat-like traits. From seeing the boy, Rinne finds out that it is actually a cat monster impersonating Yoshi, and has kidnapped him and his two other friends, leaving one more. Uncomfortable that Sakura only asks Rinne for help, Tsubasa attempts to capture the cat monster himself only to be confronted by another, along with the one impersonating Yoshi. He is soon paralysed but Rinne manages to free him. When his scythe breaks and there is no hope left, Sakura and Rokumon consult a cat encyclopedia stating to lure them into the shrine and seal it. Just as Rinne is about to do so with his intriguing staff, the woman from the street appears and pushes Rinne along with the cat monsters into the shrine, releasing the boys, who also reveal that that was the woman that had lured them to open the shrine in the first place. Tsubasa manages to release Rinne and lock the cat monsters away for good using special Holy Ash, and the woman on the street is revealed to be a damashigami, an evil shinigami who takes people to the afterlife whether they are dead or not to fill up their spirit quota. She gets away and it is foreshadowed that the boss of her organisation knows Rinne.
7	"Curse of the Rabbit Hutch"; Transliteration: "Usagi Koya no In'nen" (Japanese: ウサギ小屋の因縁)	May 16, 2015
Reiji, a high-school boy, has been in a coma ever since an accident with his motorbike and a street pole while on his way to pick his girlfriend Minami. Sakura sees his spirit at the pole and a bat-like figure carrying him away, as well as writing a misspelled "curse" word on his forehead. Later, Rinne, Sakura, Minami and another classmate of hers are lured to the roof, where Reiji's cursed spirit attempts to pull Minami off the cliff, but her wrestling skills saved herself. Later, Minami shows the three to the hospital where Reiji is sleeping, and as Rinne tries to return Reiji's spirit to his body, fails thanks to the bat-like boy again. He reveals himself to be a demon by the name of Masato who despises Rinne thanks to him causing him to fail a homework assignment and beating him every time when he tries to send other spirits to Hell. To pay back six years' worth of interest, Masato takes Reiji's spirit and escapes. While Rinne goes to buy some merchandise, Sakura, along with Rokumon, tries to convince Reiji of Masato's twisted lies that Minami is dating someone else behind his back. She fails, and luckily Rinne saves her from a deadly fall and successfully removes the "curse" sign from his forehead. However, this is all part of Masato's plan to lure Rinne to Hell while trapping Reiji in a bottle.
8	"Welcome to Hell!"; Transliteration: "Yōkoso Jigoku e!" (Japanese: ようこそ地獄へ！)	May 23, 2015
Sakura overhears Reiji muttering an apology to Minami for causing her such trouble, and "If she ever finds that thing, please tell her to throw it away." To look for the "thing", Rokumon gives the street pole Reji knocked into a temporary soul to give them information. They find out about a dog named Lucifer who likes to urinate there and collect leftover junk, including Reiji's present to Minami, whom Sakura gifts to. Meanwhile, Masato uses Reiji's soul as bait to lure Rinne to Hell so that he accumulates debts here illegally and goes to Debt Hell, where sinners who have commit sins in Hell itself are forced to work for eternity. Throwing away Reiji's spirit, Rinne dives into Debt Hell to save it. After a skirmish in which forged bank notes from Masato are involved, Hell police offer to relieve Rinne of all charges if he reveals the culprit, but chooses not to, so in return has Masato pay all his charges with his immense wealth. Retrieving Reiji's spirit, he returns after seeing the Minami receive the pair rings present he got for her, and is revived. On a side note, Masato lost all his allowance paying for Rinne's charges, and is scolded for breaking an oni's window.
9	"The Wig's Disappointment and the Pumpkin's Temptation"; Transliteration: "Katsura no Munen to Kabocha no Yūwaku" (Japanese: カツラの無念とカボチャの誘惑)	May 30, 2015
A blonde wig has earned a soul over sometime and is unable to rest after being cut out from the play Cinderella, where he played the part of the horse's tail. When they reincorporate the part, the wig happily rests and becomes an inanimate object again. Meanwhile, the girls in school are going crazy over an extremely handsome boy named Kimura. However, the real Kimura is revealed to be already dead and that his face was swapped with that of the impostor, who is revealed to be a damashigami using Kimura's face to lure girls into the afterlife. The impostor's real face is actually that of a Halloween pumpkin. All ends well when Rinne manages to undo the switch and help Kimura pass on.
10	"Damashigami Company"; Transliteration: "Damashigami Kanpanī" (Japanese: 堕魔死神カンパニー)	June 7, 2015
Rinne and Rokumon have come down with "Spirit Flu", so Sakura and Tsubasa go to see them. While they are there, a mysterious doctor bear and a robotic nurse appear, saying that they have come to help on the behest of Rinne's relatives. Believing them to be sent from his grandmother, Rinne almost lets them inject him with poison but luckily Tsubasa unzips the bear suit of the doctor bear, revealing a skeletal damashigami. After a brief scuffle in which the two are ejected out of the place, another man resembling Rinne greatly appears and affectionately calls him "son", which Rinne later reveals that that is his father, Sabato Rokudō, and that he is also the boss of the illegal 'Damashigami Company'. Sabato quickly transports his son, Sakura, Tsubasa and Rokumon to the headquarters and requests that Rinne become the heir to the company or he will send his friends to the Rinne no Wa to be killed.
11	"The Young President's Induction!"; Transliteration: "Waka Shachō Shūninshiki!?" (Japanese: 若社長就任式!?)	June 14, 2015
Rinne accepts unwillingly, and Sabato organises a contest for him to get engaged to one of the many girls in the company. Rinne refuses, and the truth behind his poverty was due to his father stealing all his money, who is now wanting to get his fingerprints to access his bank. After a fight in which Rinne's scythe is converted back to a 5000 yen note, Rinne tries to avoid his fingerprints getting obtained by his father. Meanwhile, Sakura, Tsubasa and Rokumon escape their cells and Sakura comes across Sabato's safe. Guessing his password correctly, she realises that anything Sabato converts to money is automatically transported to the safe. Sakura returns Rinne's scythe and credit cards so his father can no longer withdraw money from his bank. They manage to escape the headquarters and return home safe.
12	"Ageha the Shinigami"; Transliteration: "Shinigami Ageha" (Japanese: 死神 鳳)	June 21, 2015
A cursed pencil designed to make people smarter is brainwashing students to the Rinne no Wa, another doing of the damashigami. Rinne manages to stop him and destroy the pencil-making operations, in the process meeting another shinigami named Ageha. Both become friendly with each other as Ageha reveals her sad past and vows to destroy the Damashigami Company, and in the process is caught by Sakura when she sees Ageha clutch Rinne's hands. After Ageha leaves, Sakura begins to become increasingly cold to Rinne, although she doesn't show her jealousy or anger. A spy camera from Sabato is also caught spying on Sakura as Sabato believes Rinne to have a crush on her.
13	"Naggy"; Transliteration: "Kudoi" (Japanese: くどい)	June 28, 2015
14	"It's Not a Date!"; Transliteration: "Deito de wa Nai!" (Japanese: デートではない！)	July 5, 2015
15	"Just a Thank You"; Transliteration: "Akumade Orei" (Japanese: あくまでお礼)	July 12, 2015
Ageha, head over heels in love with Rinne, uses an expensive stacked lunch box from her family's warehouse to make lunch for him. At that, Sakura gets jealous and Rinne embarrassed, especially when the soba noodles on the rice are formed into the shape of a heart. However, on the last layer, there reveals to be octopus wieners that turn into one humongous orange octopus called the Konjikiou. Hearing Rinne's wish in his heart to talk to Sakura alone and explain everything to her, everyone is suddenly forced out of the classroom and can't get back in. Ageha soon receives news from her grandmother that that box held an evil spirit inside that will grant three wishes to the bearer in exchange for his/her soul. Frantic, Ageha along with Tsubasa (who is more worried for Sakura than Rinne's sake) try to get in. Sakura is completely oblivious but tells the Konjikiou to "shut up" so he can speak to Sakura, and it counts that as a second wish. Just one more wish before it consumes Rinne's soul, but Rinne realises and slices it, splitting it into many tiny octopus wieners instead that go around the whole city granting three wishes. As Rinne and Ageha go exterminating them, Sakura mistakes another intimate moment for them to be a couple.
16	"Memories of the Haunted Cedar"; Transliteration: "Obake Sugi no Omoide" (Japanese: おばけ杉の思い出)	July 19, 2015
17	"Curse of the Power Stone"; Transliteration: "Pawā Sutōn no Noroi" (Japanese: パワーストーンの呪い)	July 26, 2015
Masato informs Tsubasa that the power stone, now corrupted, contains enough dark energy to curse someone, and encourages him to curse Rinne with the help of a demon book picked up from Hell. He instructs Tsubasa to place his hand on the book and simply wish before departing. Tsubasa refuses and dumps the book then and there. However, after watching Sakura give more cookies to Rinne, he becomes jealous and finds himself cursing Rinne to be struck by lightning, as well as the demon book being returned to him. Frightened, Tsubasa dumps it away only for it to be returned to him by Rokumon, who thought it was his notes, just at that same moment when he was blaming Rinne for "taking advantage of being poor so that he could mooch of Sakura". At that moment, crows fly into his house and steal all the cookies given by Sakura. Even more frightened and panicked, Tsubasa also realises that the power stone becomes darker each time he curses and decides to gift Rinne a good luck charm secretly that can ward off curses, only to find that Rinne gave it to Sakura instead and curses him, causing rain to leak through the roof and coincidentally on Rinne, wetting his food. Tsubasa tries to burn the book but it is returned again just as he finished setting a trap for Masato, who wants to receive Tsubasa's corrupted soul to Hell. The trap transports Masato, but also Rinne who had deduced this was all his doing. Tsubasa accidentally curses Rinne again and decides that the ultimate punishment is for him to curse himself to die and go to Hell, which clears the power stone halfway because it reflects its owner's soul. He also receives a bounce-back curse and successfully clears the power stone. However, it darkens a little again when he get jealous of Rinne later.
18	"Shirushigami Kain"; Transliteration: "Shirushigami Kain" (Japanese: 記死神 架印)	August 2, 2015
When Ageha attempts to track down a damashigami, she comes across a shirushigami named Kain, shinigami that are bookkeepers that ensure people have indeed lived out their living time, and are not taken against their will illegally like what damashigami do. After recognising her as the sister of the Damashigami Company's secretary, he embarrasses and criticises her, labelling her as "stupid", causing her to find Rinne and tell him everything. Kain arrives soon after school and reveals that Sabato caused his family to be broke as his divorced mother was blinded by love and gave him all their money, causing him to give up on his dreams of going to high school, instead getting a job at the Mortal Census Bureau for shirushigami. He attempts to kill Rinne as that will pay off all the debts, succeeding in taking his Haori of the Underworld, and Life Flame, which accounts for his entire lifespan, as collateral for a loan. With Rinne's spirit, Sakura, Rokumon, Ageha and Tsubasa rush to regain Rinne's Life Flame before ten in the morning the next day, when the Afterlife Recycle Shop opens and Kain can sell it off. They find Kain's house and mother, who is still unbelievably being conned by Sabato, as well as the robe and Life Flame. He puts Ageha, Rokumon and Tsubasa to sleep, locks Sakura away in a shed, and sets out to chase Rinne, who is being pulled into the Rinne no Wa despite materialising physically with the Haori.
19	"In the Box"; Transliteration: "Hako no Naka" (Japanese: 箱の中)	August 9, 2015
Sakura comes across Sabato's sold junk in the shed, including a secret box meant for Rinne that is protected by a special barrier. Waking up the others, Ageha destroys the shed, allowing them to bring him the box containing a secret object. The object is revealed to be a Hoop of Judgement, a legendary tool that can bring the bearer to the criminal of their wish. Although Rinne initially thought that he pulled Sakura with him into the Rinne no Wa, the Hoop of Judgement transports them to Sabato as he is the root of all the crimes that were wrongly placed on his son, who is currently stopping by Kain's place to borrow money again. As Kain hides and prepares many fake Life Flames, Rinne duels with him using Ageha's scythe as the others attempt to find the real one. All of them meet in the sitting-room, where Rinne manages to regain his Life Flame but his father gets away. Eventually, Kain understands that Rinne is also a victim of Sabato and anyway is protected by the Hoop of Judgement, which can activate when the user is also attacked unjustly.
20	"A Home Without Spirits"; Transliteration: "Rei no Konai Ie" (Japanese: 霊の来ない家)	August 16, 2015
21	"M's Tragedy"; Transliteration: "Emu no Higeki" (Japanese: Mの悲劇)	August 23, 2015
22	"Merry Christmas in the Derelict"; Transliteration: "Haioku de Merī Kurisumasu" (Japanese: 廃屋のメリークリスマス)	August 30, 2015
23	"Fox Trap"; Transliteration: "Kizune Otoshi" (Japanese: 狐おとし)	September 6, 2015
24	"Spirited Ramen"; Transliteration: "Rāmen Kaedama" (Japanese: ラーメンかえ魂)	September 13, 2015
Sabato has been possessed by a spirit to work and cook ramen tirelessly, and Rinne generously releases his father from the burden. Much to his surprise, Sabato agrees to let the spirit use his body to fulfill his life goal of making every customer leave the store with happiness and satisfaction. The next day, Rinne returns to find how things are going only to find the spirit possessing a doll resembling his father instead, and his real father lounging in a hot spring. Sabato reveals his plot of how the spirit eagerly took on the doll's body after hearing that it would never get tired, and Sabato "generously" donated special noodles to him to make his ramen that can suck the souls out of all the customers. Rinne is at a loss of words when Sabato says that he doesn't understand the heart of that spirit, but concocts an impressive plot by calling the restaurant and requesting for a delivery of 500 bowls of ramen stacked. Excited, the spirit gets to work but the doll fails due to exhaustion, and the spirit turns to Sabato's real body instead.
25	"Target: Sakura"; Transliteration: "Tāgetto wa Sakura" (Japanese: ターゲットは桜)	September 20, 2015
It is the time of the year again where the A-1 Grand Prix is to be held, a competition where 5,000 evil spirits gather to compete against each other in cursing and hunting people, always choosing a target. The spirits are currently locked in an old well and Sakura opens it out of curiosity, causing her to be targeted by the evil spirits. Furthermore, because of eating candy Tamako gave her, she reverted to a normal human and is unable to see spirits anymore, and is thus unknowing of the danger she is in. Rinne accompanies her everywhere in his Haori of the Underworld to stay unseen to protect her, and after killing the last spirit at his house where Sakura is, the candy's side effects wear off and she can see and touch him again.

=== Season 2 ===
No.	Title	Original release date
26	"Black Cat Oboro"; Transliteration: "Kuro Neko Oboro" (Japanese: 黒猫朧)	April 9, 2016
27	"Court of Dreams"; Transliteration: "Yume no Kōto" (Japanese: 夢のコート)	April 16, 2016
27	"Inside the Letter Box"; Transliteration: "Fumibako no Naka" (Japanese: 文箱の中)	April 16, 2016
28	"Missing Membership Fee"; Transliteration: "Kieta Kaihi" (Japanese: 消えた会費)	April 23, 2016
29	"Love Song"; Transliteration: "Ai no Uta" (Japanese: 愛の歌)	April 30, 2016
30	"Memory Excavation"; Transliteration: "Omoide Hakkutsu" (Japanese: 思い出発掘)	May 7, 2016
30	"Lend Me Some Money?"; Transliteration: "Okane Kashite?" (Japanese: お金貸して?)	May 7, 2016
30	"Campsite Demon"; Transliteration: "Kyanpu-jō no Akuma" (Japanese: キャンプ場の悪魔)	May 7, 2016
Sabato goes around asking for money, approaching Rinne first, then Sakura, and Ageha, but all his lies are foiled. Following him, they come across Bijin who reveals that Sabato is urgently searching for something after the loan sharks took everything away. Kain also tells the group that the shirushigami seized the loan sharks for illegal moneylending shortly before and has taken away everything they seized to the storeroom. They find Sabato there rummaging throughout the racks of things as Rinne attempts to stop his father. Sakura finds out that the thing Sabato was so desperate for that he would actually pay money to get back was a photo of him carrying baby Rinne, and she generously lends him 1,000 yen although she doesn't expect the money to be returned. Much to her surprise, Sabato returns the money, and Bijin realises that he had hidden 5,000 yen inside the photoframe making him so desperate to get it back. Masato goes camping and places demon-summoning tags in all the resort cottages, which attracts the notice of a young boy. Curious, he goes out every night to burn these tags, curious of seeing a demon in real life, unaware that his older sister has called Rinne, Tsubasa and Sakura, who immediately recognise Masato even though he is hiding his wings. Masato originally intended to be summoned and then capture the boy's soul to bring it to Hell, but just as he is about to escape, Rinne gets in his way. Masato concocts another plan instead and hosts a barbeque, revealing a magic circle and intends to bring Hell's Army to destroy them, but they are surprisingly on holiday. Granted, his plans are foiled indeed.
31	"Homestay Practice"; Transliteration: "Hōmusutei Jisshū" (Japanese: ホームステイ実習)	May 14, 2016
32	"Supervisory Responsibility"; Transliteration: "Kantoku Sekinin" (Japanese: 監督責任)	May 21, 2016
33	"The Cursed Straw Doll"; Transliteration: "Noroi no Wara Ningyo" (Japanese: 呪いのワラ人形)	May 28, 2016
34	"Mikazukidō for All Your Scythe Needs"; Transliteration: "Kama no Koto nara Mikazukidō" (Japanese: 鎌の事なら三日月堂)	June 4, 2016
35	"Black Cat 6 Dan"; Transliteration: "Kuroneko Roku-dan" (Japanese: 黒猫六段)	June 11, 2016
36	"Monsters of the Summer Festival"; Transliteration: "Natsumatsuri no Kai" (Japanese: 夏祭りの怪)	June 18, 2016
37	"Ghost Boat"; Transliteration: "Yūrei Gomubōto" (Japanese: 幽霊ゴムボート)	June 25, 2016
37	"Something in the Tunnel"; Transliteration: "Tonneru ni Nanika Iru" (Japanese: トンネルに何かいる)	June 25, 2016
37	"Welcome to Nehanya"; Transliteration: "Nehanya e Yōkoso!" (Japanese: 涅槃家へようこそ!)	June 25, 2016
38	"The Mysterious Transfer Student"; Transliteration: "Nazo no Tenkōsei" (Japanese: 謎の転校生)	July 2, 2016
A mysterious beautiful girl called Renge Shima has transferred to Sakura, Tsubasa and Rinne's class. Because of her beauty, she has stolen the boyfriend of Erika, a second-year student. When Erika confronts Renge and her boyfriend, Shuuto on the rooftop, Renge has him jump to catch her as she floats off the roof and a gateway to the Afterlife appears behind her but Rinne manages to intervene and save him, much to Renge's annoyance. By the time Shuuto comes to, he cannot remember Renge, and Rinne deduces that she was trying to lure him into the Afterlife, making her out to be a damashigami. After school, Renge asks that Sakura take her to her house and begin to have tea with her, but not before she sucks out Tsubasa's soul on the pretext of asking him to remove the spirit perpetually hanging around her. When Rinne discovers Tsubasa, he fights Renge, who reveals the spirit around her is a fake designed to lure men and is sprayed with pheromone liquid. Rinne manages to foil her plot and lure the men away out of the portal by planting a temporary soul into Tsubasa's body and emptying the pheromone liquid onto it. Meanwhile, Renge has Sakura taken to a virtual realm with Tsubasa's caged soul, and engulfs Rinne with water within the portal. Although Rinne tries to destroy the tap, he is knocked out. Renge throws Tsubasa into her vault, and decides to keep Sakura as her first girl friend, as well as her servant so she can be twice as efficient and lure more male souls. Rinne manages to foil her plot again and defeat Renge, as well as release all the souls she has lured into her trap.
39	"Renge's Revenge"; Transliteration: "Renge no Fukushū" (Japanese: れんげの復讐)	July 9, 2016
Renge tricks Rokumon into drinking Hench Tea, a type of tea she tried to serve to Sakura the previous episode that will turn the drinker into the server's servant instantly. Rokumon proceeds to give Rinne, Tsubasa and Sakura the tea as well, and Renge orders Rinne to work for her as. damashigami and Sakura to help her lure boys' souls with a pheromone spray as well, leaving Tsubasa behind to clean the floor. While Renge's plot appears to be working well, the Hench Tea starts to wear off because Rokumon, being used to making tea without much tea leaves, only added a tenth of the cup as tea leaves while the rest was water. Next, Renge pretends to make protective straps that protect one from spirits, causing a great number of students to get them, but it can only temporarily exorcise spirits before the school becomes a vacuum full of them. Knowing that those harbouring the protective straps will be possessed by especially evil spirits, she goes to the rooftop, where many students have gathered wanting to commit suicide. Unfortunately, Rinne realises that his scythe blade had been pawned by Rokumon because it was the only way for them to earn money to buy food. Tsubasa gets to work with his Holy Ash, while Sakura tries to inform the school community about the straps being cursed. However, gathering all the straps to be disposed is part of Renge's plan to let them suck up evil aura and gather other evil spirits. Unfortunately, her plan backfires as the straps had sucked up all the hobo aura in the clubrooms instead, leaving Sakura unharmed. Rokumon also pawns Renge's furniture without her permission and manages to rebuy Rinne's scythe blade.
40	"Recovery Cream"; Transliteration: "Rikabarī Kurīmu" (Japanese: リカバリークリーム)	July 16, 2016
40	"Rumors"; Transliteration: "Uwasa" (Japanese: 噂)	July 16, 2016
40	"Mushroom Hunting"; Transliteration: "Kinoko Kari" (Japanese: キノコ狩り)	July 16, 2016
41	"Catastrophe Set"; Transliteration: "Hakyoku Setto" (Japanese: 破局セット)	July 23, 2016
42	"Alumni Meeting of Shinigami Primary School"; Transliteration: "Shinigami Shōgakkō Dōsōkai" (Japanese: 死神小学校同窓会)	July 30, 2016
43	"Kuroneko Rank Test"; Transliteration: "Kuroneko Dan'i Tesuto" (Japanese: 黒猫段位テスト)	August 6, 2016
44	"MVC"	August 13, 2016
45	"Hot Pot Boss"; Transliteration: "Nabe to bugyō" (Japanese: 鍋と奉行)	August 20, 2016
45	"Demon Type A, Shinigami Type B"; Transliteration: "Akuma A-gata shinigami B-ga" (Japanese: 悪魔A型 死神B型)	August 20, 2016
46	"Have My Scarf"; Transliteration: "Mafurā, agemasu" (Japanese: マフラー、あげます)	August 27, 2016
46	"Waiting on the Rink"; Transliteration: "Rinku de matteru" (Japanese: リンクで待ってる)	August 27, 2016
47	"Never Change..."; Transliteration: "Ano koro no mama..." (Japanese: あの頃のまま...)	September 3, 2016
48	"Shinigami Sakura!?"; Transliteration: "Shinigami Sakura!?" (Japanese: 死神 桜！？)	September 10, 2016
49	"Matsugo Returns!?"; Transliteration: "Matsugo Futatabi!?" (Japanese: 沫悟 再び！？)	September 17, 2016
50	"Sakura's Wager"; Transliteration: "Sakura no Kake" (Japanese: 桜の賭け)	September 24, 2016

=== Season 3 ===
No.	Title	Original release date
51	"Golden License"; Transliteration: "Gourudo Raisensu" (Japanese: ゴールドライセンス)	April 8, 2017
52	"The Cursed Ace"; Transliteration: "Norowareta Ēsu" (Japanese: 呪われたエース)	April 15, 2017
52	"Draw me" Transliteration: "Watashi wo Kaite" (Japanese: 私を描いて)	April 15, 2017
53	"Wheel of Reincarnation Cleanup Day"; Transliteration: "Umarekawari no Kurīn'appu no Hi" (Japanese: 生まれ変わりのクリーンアップの日)	April 22, 2017
53	"Infinite Malice"; Transliteration: "Urami Mugendai" (Japanese: 恨み無限大)	April 22, 2017
53	"The Puppy in the Rain"; Transliteration: "Ame no Naka no Koinu" (Japanese: 雨の中の子犬)	April 22, 2017
54	"Ane at the Shopping Mall"; Transliteration: "Shippingu Mōru no Ane" (Japanese: ショッピングモールの姉)	April 29, 2017
55	"Kuroboshi Sansei"; Transliteration: "Kuroboshi Sansei" (Japanese: 黒星三世)	May 6, 2017
55	"The Lucky Pot"; Transliteration: "Kaiun no Tsubo" (Japanese: 開運の壺)	May 6, 2017
55	"Bamboo Sprout in Rainbow Color"; Transliteration: "Nijiiro no Takenoko" (Japanese: 虹色のタケノコ)	May 6, 2017
56	"Special Protected Sacred Bird"; Transliteration: "Tokubetsu Hogo Reichō" (Japanese: 特別保護霊鳥)	May 13, 2017
56	"June Bride"; Transliteration: "Jyuun Buraido" (Japanese: ジューンブライド)	May 13, 2017
56	"Hell's Safe"; Transliteration: "Jigoku no Kinko" (Japanese: 地獄の金庫)	May 13, 2017
57	"Wandering Power Stone"; Transliteration: "Samayoeru Pawā Sutōn" (Japanese: さまよえるパワーストーン)	May 20, 2017
58	"Open After Seven Days"; Transliteration: "Nanoka Tattara Akeru Koto" (Japanese: 七日たったら開けること)	May 27, 2017
59	"Apologize in The Altar Room"; Transliteration: "Butsuma de Ayamare" (Japanese: 仏間で謝れ)	June 3, 2017
60	"The First Association Meet"; Transliteration: "Daiikkai Kumiai Taikai" (Japanese: 第一回組合大会)	June 10, 2017
61	"Mystery of the Flower Path"; Transliteration: "Hanabatake no Nazo" (Japanese: 花畑の謎)	June 17, 2017
62	"Evil Spirit in the Summer House"; Transliteration: "Bessō no Akuryō" (Japanese: 別荘の悪霊)	June 24, 2017
63	"Otome the Shinigami"; Transliteration: "Shinigami Otome" (Japanese: 死神 乙女)	July 1, 2017
64	"Lies and Truth"; Transliteration: "Uso to Shinjitsu" (Japanese: ウソと真実)	July 8, 2017
65	"Kokkuri-san"; Transliteration: "Kokkurisan" (Japanese: こっくりさん)	July 15, 2017
66	"Curse of Splurge"; Transliteration: "Sanzai no Noroi" (Japanese: 散財の呪い)	July 22, 2017
67	"Head Man"; Transliteration: "Kubi Otoko" (Japanese: 首男)	July 29, 2017
68	"The Practical Training for Capturing a Dream Demon"; Transliteration: "Muma Hobaku Jisshū" (Japanese: 夢魔捕縛実習)	August 5, 2017
69	"Nothing Inside"; Transliteration: "Nakami ga Nai" (Japanese: 中身がない)	August 12, 2017
70	"Wings of Celebration"; Transliteration: "Shukufuku no Hane" (Japanese: 祝福の羽)	August 19, 2017
71	"Black Swamp Thing"; Transliteration: "Shikakute Kuroi Yatsu" (Japanese: 四角くて黒いやつ)	August 26, 2017
72	"A Ring and Stamp"; Transliteration: "Yubiwa to Inkan" (Japanese: 指輪と印鑑)	September 2, 2017
73	"Good Luck Wax"; Transliteration: "Kin'un Wakkusu" (Japanese: 金運ワックス)	September 9, 2017
74	"Supplemental Class for Fierce Dog Catching"; Transliteration: "Mōken Hokaku Hoshū" (Japanese: 猛犬捕獲補習)	September 16, 2017
75	"A Promise in the Underworld"; Transliteration: "Meikai no Yakusoku" (Japanese: 冥界の約束)	September 23, 2017
