= Jun Matsumoto =

Japanese singer, actor, radio host (born 1983)

Jun Matsumoto 松本 潤
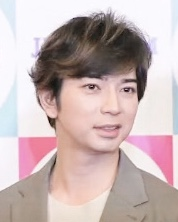
- Matsumoto in November 2019
- Born: August 30, 1983 (age 43); Toshima, Tokyo, Japan
- Other name: MatsuJun
- Occupations: Singer; actor; radio host; dancer; model
- Years active: 1996–present
- Musical career
- Genre: J-pop
- Instrument: Vocals
- Labels: Pony Canyon; J Storm
- Formerly of: Arashi
- Website: mjc.inc?lang=en

Jun Matsumoto (松本 潤, Matsumoto Jun; born August 30, 1983) is a Japanese singer, actor, radio host, and model. He was a member and concert producer of the boy band Arashi (started under Johnny & Associates, later under Starto Entertainment). He is also a production advisor for other groups.

Matsumoto began his career in the entertainment industry when he joined the Japanese talent agency Johnny & Associates in 1996 at the age of 12. With the taking over of Johnny's artists by Starto Entertainment in 2023, he, as well as the other members became part of the agency as part of Arashi, with the group being under agent contract. He became independent in 2024 for individual activities, remaining with the agency until the end of activities of the group, on May 31, 2026.

Best known to Japanese television drama audiences for his portrayal as Tsukasa Dōmyōji in the 2005 television drama series Boys Over Flowers, for which he won GQ Japan's Man of the Year Award under the singer/actor category for his work in the drama, prior to his debut as a singer with Arashi in 1999, Matsumoto started an acting career when he was cast as Teddy Duchamp for the stage play Stand by Me, which was based on the film of the same name. Since then, he has gone on to appear in numerous dramas and movies, receiving a number of awards and nominations for his roles. With the end of activities of his group in May 2026, Matsumoto plans on concentrating on his acting career.

== Early life ==
Matsumoto was born in Toshima, Tokyo, as the youngest child in his family. When he was born, the kanji candidate for his name was '純', but his grandmother said '潤' was better. He has an older sister whose support of KinKi Kids influenced his decision to join Johnny & Associates in 1996. Thinking it might bode good luck, he sent his application to the agency on his elementary school graduation day and received a phone call weeks later from president Johnny Kitagawa himself, inviting him to attend a rehearsal instead of being auditioned. Due to this, Matsumoto is frequently referred to as one of the elite within the agency.

Matsumoto graduated from Horikoshi Gakuen, a renowned high school known for its many performing arts alumnae such as Kyoko Fukada and Ai Kato, in March 2002 at the age of 18.

== Career ==
Matsumoto announced in October 2023 on a fan club video the release of a photo book to celebrate his turning 40. The book included the account of his experience portraying Ieyasu Tokugawa. The book was released in December 2023. On May 31, 2024, the "Oricon First Half 'Book' Ranking" was announced. In the "Men's Photo Books" genre, Matsumoto's book ranked 2nd, after accumulating 66000 units sold in the period.

As with fellow member Kazunari Ninomiya, Matsumoto announced on May 16, 2024, that he would become independent from Starto in relation to individual activities, but would remain as part of Arashi. Matsumoto left on May 30.

On June 1, 2024 Matsumoto updated his Instagram account, posting information about his new company, MJC Inc., and giving its website. On the opening page of the website, Matsumoto states the plans of the company: "We focus on creativity and bonding to generate new value, aiming to lead Japan and the world to a brighter future through entertainment." He is named as "Chief Entertainment Officer". On December 3, 2024, Matsumoto announced through MJC that he had signed an agent contract with Eternal Moments Inc. for his individual activities, keeping the original site for contracts related to planning, producing and directing. Almost two years later, on November 1, 2026, Matsumoto, thankful for the support received, announced the contracted period had ended and that any contract to be made in the future should be done through his company, MJC.

Japanese fashion brand company Renown Corporation, owned by Chinese company Shandong Ruyi, named Matsumoto local brand ambassador for the British brand Aquascutum's trench coat line in October 2026. His new ads with the brand show Matsumoto sporting a beard, giving him a more mature image, far from his former idol one.

=== Early career ===
Still part of the Johnny and Associates trainees, Matsumoto was paired with future co–members Masaki Aiba and Kazunari Ninomiya, and Toma Ikuta as the unit "MAIN", the name made with the inicials of each one of the members. As part of MAIN, Matsumoto appeared in the stageplay "Stand By Me", based on the movie of the same name.

Even as part of the "elite" of the agency, Matsumoto was teased as a youngster for his hetare (へたれ) (weakling) appearance. As part of Arashi, on their 2001 program Mayonaka no Arashi in a corner named "Weakling Matsumoto gets hit by a waterfall (ヘタレ松本 滝に打たれる, Hetare Matsumoto taki ni utareru)", Matsumoto underwent training for takigyô, a social–religious ritual originally practiced by Buddhist monks and Shinto priests, which consists in a sort of guided meditation taken under a waterfall with the purpose of strengthening the body and mind.

=== Music career ===
Although the majority of Matsumoto's solos for albums and concerts are written by Arashi's staff, he has contributed lyrics for some of his solos: "La Familia" for the 2004 Arashi! Iza, Now Tour!!, "Naked" in 2008 for the album Dream "A" Live (under the pen name "Jun"), and "Stay Gold" in 2014 for the album The Digitalian. He also supervised the song "DRIVE" in 2016 for the album Are You Happy? and took part in writing lyrics with other Arashi members as Arashi for their songs "Fight Song", "Energy Song - Zekkōchō Chō!!!!", "5×10", and "5×20".

=== Concert production ===
Matsumoto began to be involved in concert production in 2000. Although he primarily focused on Arashi concerts, he also gave advice on concert production to younger Johnny & Associates groups, such as for Hey! Say! JUMP in 2014 and King & Prince in 2018; and in 2021 he was director for the Year-End Johnny's Festival Thank you 2021 Hello 2022 concert, featuring many different groups from Johnny & Associates.

He is officially credited as the director in the closing credits for the concerts Arashi Anniversary Tour 5×20 and Arafes 2020, as well as on the official website of Johnny's Festival Thank you 2021 Hello 2022 for the concert of the same name. He was named director of Starto Entertainment's April 2024 all-agency live. The concert series, named "We Are!! Let's get the party STARTO!!", was co-directed by Matsumoto and Super Eight's Tadayoshi Okura, and would become the last event produced by Matsumoto before his independence from Starto.

As a concert producer, Matsumoto had also been conceptualizing new ideas. In 2005, he, along with the concert staff team, implemented the usage of the moving stage, which has been subsequently used by several Asian musical acts. 3 years prior to Arashi Live Tour 2014 The Digitalian, Matsumoto had been putting efforts into the idea of utilizing light color changes via bluetooth onto penlights, and the concept was successfully implemented in the previously mentioned concert.

=== Acting career ===
==== Stage ====
In 1997, Matsumoto was cast in his first stage play, which was based on the American coming of age film Stand by Me with future bandmates Masaki Aiba and Kazunari Ninomiya. He did not return to do any major stage productions for nearly seven years after Stand by Me, instead focusing on dramas and movies. However, in 2004, Matsumoto appeared in the stage play West Side Story with bandmates Satoshi Ohno and Sho Sakurai.

In 2005 and 2006, Matsumoto was given his first lead stage play roles in Eden no Higashi (エデンの東, East of Eden) and Byakuya no Onna Kishi (白夜の女騎士, Valkyrie of the White Night) respectively.

It was announced on July 21, 2011, that Matsumoto would star in Yukio Ninagawa's production play, Aa, Kōya (あゝ, 荒野, Ah, Wilderness), his first stage play in five years.

On April 16, 2024, it was reported that Matsumoto would appear in Hideki Noda's Noda Map's new play, held from July to November. Noda was not open to appointing talent from the former Johnny's office, the reason being their schedule. "With so many activities, like concerts, variety shows and tv. appearances, I thought they couldn't do the job.", he said in a press conference in 2023. In Matsumoto's case, the opportunity was given thanks to Arashi's hiatus. According to the report, he attended Noda's workshop and prepared for the stage since February. Performances were expected not only in Japan but also in London, England. The play, called Sei sankaku kankei (正三角関係, Trilateral connection) and Love in Action in English, is loosely based on Fyodor Dostoevsky's The Brothers Karamazov. Matsumoto, who shared the stage with Masami Nagasawa, and Eita Nagayama, plays the eldest of the Karamatsu brothers, a pyrotechnic artist, in a suspense story that deals with the "incident" of the murder of their father. The play had performances in Tokyo, at the Tokyo Metropolitan Theatre, in Kitakyushu and Osaka, as well as Sadler's Wells Theatre in London, running from July 11 until November 2.

==== Drama ====
Like bandmate Sho Sakurai, Matsumoto made his acting debut as a television actor. He appeared in the April 1997 TBS drama special Hoken Chousain (保険調査員, Insurance Investigator). A few months later, he co-starred with the members of KinKi Kids and future bandmate Masaki Aiba in the mystery-thriller series Bokura no Yūki: Miman Toshi (ぼくらの勇気, Our Courage: Miman City). In 2003, his Gokusen character Shin Sawada made a cameo in Sakurai's series Yoiko no Mikata (よい子の味方, Ally of Good Children). He made a guest appearance on the final episode of bandmate Satoshi Ohno's drama Kaibutsu-kun (怪物くん, Little Monster) in 2010, drama based on Fujiko Fujio's manga and anime series Kaibutsu-kun.

In 1999, all the members of Arashi co-starred together for the first time in the volleyball-centered short drama V no Arashi (Vの嵐). They appeared together after nearly ten years in the 2010 drama special Saigo no Yakusoku (最後の約束, Last Promise). Matsumoto portrayed Nozomu Gotō (後藤 望, Gotō Nozomu), a 27-year-old motorcycle courier rider who is caught up in a building hijack.

Matsumoto was cast as Hajime Kinda'ichi in the third season of Kinda'ichi Shōnen no Jikenbo in 2001, taking over the role from Tsuyoshi Domoto and co-starring opposite Anne Suzuki.

Matsumoto gained further popularity as an actor in 2002, when he starred in the first season of Gokusen with Yukie Nakama, Shun Oguri, Tomohiro Waki, Hiroki Narimiya and Yuma Ishigaki. His portrayal of the troubled but highly intelligent student, Shin Sawada, drew acclaim and won him Best Supporting Actor at the 33rd Television Drama Academy Awards. He later returned with most of the original cast to star in the special epilogue episode in 2003.

In 2003, Matsumoto took another high-profile role in the live-action adaptation of manga series Kimi wa Pet as Takeshi "Momo" Goda, starring opposite Koyuki.

In 2005, Matsumoto took the most prominent role of his career to date, when he was cast as Domyōuji Tsukasa in the live-action adaptation of shōjo manga Hana Yori Dango. Co-starring opposite Oguri again, and with Mao Inoue, Shota Matsuda and Tsuyoshi Abe, the series was a success with an average viewership rating of 19.6%. Matsumoto's portrayal as the air-headed and arrogant leader of four rich heirs won him Best Supporting Actor again at the 47th Television Drama Academy Awards. In 2007, due to the success of Hana Yori Dango, it spawned a second season, which was an even bigger hit with television audiences as it had a peak rating of 27.6% on the final episode and an overall rating of 21.57%. Matsumoto won Best Supporting Actor at the 10th Nikkan Sports Drama Grand Prix for his role. The series ended with a movie in 2008. In the new series, Hana Nochi Hare ~ Hanadan Next Season, that aired in 2018, he returned as Domyōuji (along with Oguri and Matsuda, two more of the original F4 members) for a one-episode guest appearance.

In 2007, Matsumoto starred in Bambino!, which won him his first Best Actor award at the 53rd Television Drama Academy Awards. In 2008, he re-united with Bambino! co-star Karina for the drama special Myū no Anyo Papa ni Ageru (みゅうの足パパにあげる, Myū will Give Daddy Her Legs), which aired as part of the 24-hour Television telethon in 2008. He portrayed a man diagnosed with CIDP struggling to recuperate and return to normal life with his wife and young daughter. The drama special received a viewership rating of 25.6%.

In 2009, Matsumoto starred in his first drama series in nearly two years. He portrayed Vito Hayakawa (早川ビト, Hayakawa Vito), a half-Japanese, half-Filipino young man who always faces life with a smile in the drama Smile, with Oguri once more. Matsumoto subsequently won Best Actor for his role in the 13th Nikkan Sports Drama Grand Prix. Fuji TV announced on September 10, 2009, that Matsumoto would star in a three-part drama special called Wagaya no Rekishi (わが家の歴史, History of our Family) scheduled to air for three consecutive days in the spring of 2010.

Matsumoto co-starred with Yūko Takeuchi in his first Getsuku drama titled Natsu no Koi wa Nijiiro ni Kagayaku (夏の恋は虹色に輝く, Summer Love Shines in Rainbow Colors) in 2010.

In 2012, co-starring with Eita Nagayama who played as Teru Nitta, Matsumoto played the role of Shuntaro Tokita in Lucky Seven, a series surrounding a group of quirky detectives.

In 2014, co-starring with Satomi Ishihara who played as Saeko Takahashi, Matsumoto played as Koyurugi Sota in the live-adaptation of romance Josei manga series Shitsuren Chocolatier.

In 2016, Matsumoto starred as Hiroto Miyama in 99.9 Keiji Senmon Bengoshi (99.9-刑事専門弁護士-, 99.9 Criminal Lawyer). The series is about a lawyer always eager to find the 0.1% truth in the midst of 99.9% cases in Japan, where once one is prosecuted, they are presumably guilty. Later in 2018, Matsumoto returned for the sequel titled 99.9 Keiji Senmon Bengoshi-Season II (99.9-刑事専門弁護士-SEASON II, 99.9 Criminal Lawyer-Season II). The sequel also experienced success like the prequel, with an average viewership of 17.6% in the Kanto region, being one of the most praised drama series in 2018. The series continued in 2021, with a special on TV '99.9 Keiji Senmon Bengoshi - Kanzen shinsaku - Aratana deai-hen (99.9－刑事専門弁護士－ 完全新作SP 新たな出会い篇, 99.9 Criminal Lawyer - Completely new work special - A new encounter) and a film 99.9 Keiji Senmon Bengoshi- The Movie (99.9-刑事専門弁護士-THE MOVIE, 99.9 Criminal Lawyer-The Movie), that were released on December 29 and 30, respectively.

By the end of 2021, Matsumoto's next drama was announced, his first co-starring role with long time friend Aya Ueto, called Tonari no Chikara (となりのチカラ, My neighbor Chikara), airing weekly from January 20, 2022. He portrayed Chikara Nakagoshi, a stay-at-home family man, who's also a struggling writer, that neglects other duties while being concerned with the wellbeing of people around him.

In 2019, Matsumoto played lead role as Matsuura Takeshirō in the NHK drama special, Eien no Nispa~Hokkaido to Nazuketa Otoko Matsuura Takeshiro~ (永遠のニㇱパ～北海道と名付けた男 松浦武四郎～) which was made to commemorate the 150th anniversary of the naming of Hokkaido. In 2026, Matsumoto appeared in another historic series, Song of the Samurai as Katamori Matsudaira.

Matsumoto plays the lead role in 2023 NHK Taiga drama titled What Will You Do, Ieyasu? (どうする家康), as Tokugawa Ieyasu. As his character, he appeared in a cameo role in the first minutes of the last episode of The 13 Lords of the Shogun As part of the promotion for the taiga, Matsumoto and other actors visited Okazaki City in Aichi Prefecture, and Shizuoka City and Hamamatsu City in Shizuoka Prefecture, which are the main setting of the story, in what was called "Tokai Premier Relay". He also participated as part of a mounted procession happening for the first time in the Hamamatsu Kite Festival on May 5, 2023. This drama marked also the 4th time he appeared alongside Nanako Matsushima, who plays Ieyasu's mother, following Hana Yori Dango (as his sister), Lucky Seven (as his boss) and "My Neighbor Chikara (as his neighbor).

Matsumoto's expected starring role in a Fuji Television Wednesday drama in July 2025 as a police officer was uncertain, following the Fuji Television – Masahiro Nakai scandal. It would be the first starring role since the NHK taiga drama "Dosuru Ieyasu" (2023) and the first since obtaining his independence from Starto Entertainment in 2024. "It is up to him to decide whether or not he can appear." said a representative from Fuji TV. Unfortunately, it never happened.

==== Film ====
Along with future bandmate Aiba, Matsumoto appeared on the silver screen in the 1998 film Shinjuku Tanteidan Shōnen (新宿少年探偵団, Shinjuku Boy Detectives).

In 2002, Matsumoto and the other Arashi members co-starred in their first movie together called Pikanchi Life is Hard Dakedo Happy (ピカ☆ンチ Life is HardだけどHappy, Pikanchi Life is Hard But Happy). They came together again for the sequels Pikanchi Life is Hard Dakara Happy (ピカ☆☆ンチ Life is HardだからHappy, Pikanchi Life is Hard Therefore Happy) in 2004, and Pikanchi Life is Hard Tabun Happy (ピカ☆★☆ンチ Life is HardたぶんHappy, Pikanchi Life is Hard Perhaps Happy) in 2014. In 2007, Arashi starred in their fourth movie together, Kiiroi Namida

He also starred in the 2002 film Tokyo Tower, as a womanizer with a preference for older women, with Junichi Okada.

Matsumoto was cast in the 2007 independent film Boku wa Imōto ni Koi o Suru with Nana Eikura as his co-star. He portrayed the lead character Yori Yūki (結城 頼, Yūki Yori), a high school student who falls in love and develops a romantic relationship with his younger twin sister.

In 2008, Matsumoto took on his first jidaigeki role in a re-make of Akira Kurosawa's Hidden Fortress: The Last Princess, with award-winning actors Hiroshi Abe, Kippei Shiina and Masami Nagasawa. Soon after, TBS decided to end the Hana Yori Dango series through a film. Hana Yori Dango Final, which hit the big screen on June 28, 2008, in Japan, became a box office hit.

In 2013, Matsumoto Jun played the role of Okuda Kosuke along with actress Ueno Juri in director Miki Takahiro's (Solanin, Boku ga Ita) movie Hidamari no Kanojo (Her Sunny Side), which was filmed in January and hit cinemas in October.

In 2017, Matsumoto Jun played the role of Takashi Hayama in the Movie 'Narratage' along with actress Kasumi Arimura.

Matsumoto reprised his role as Hiroto Miyama in 2021's 99.9 Keiji Senmon Bengoshi The Movie (99.9-刑事専門弁護士-THE MOVIE, 99.9 Criminal Lawyer The Movie), a sequel to the 99.9 Criminal Lawyer drama series.

== Other ventures ==
=== TV host ===
From 2005 to 2007, Matsumoto along with Akiko Wada, Aya Matsuura, KAT-TUN, Tomochika, and Hinoi Team hosted Minna no Terebi/Utawara Hot Hit 10.

=== Radio ===
Matsumoto had his own radio show, Jun Style, on Nack5 from October 5, 2002, to September 2011.

=== Exhibition ===
On November 4, 2023, through a video for members of Arashi's FC, Matsumoto announced the year–end opening of an exhibition in Roppongi Museum, named Jun Matsumoto Exhibition 'Perspective ~ Toki o tsunagu manazashi ~' (JUN MATSUMOTO EXHIBITION「PERSPECTIVE ‐時をつなぐ眼差し‐」), given after Matsumoto's experience playing Tokugawa Ieyasu, according to the official Twitter and the event's official site. It was a 6-person collaboration, with photographers Kazumi Kurigami, Jiro Konami and Yoshiharu Ota, actor Junichi Okada, painter/contemporary artist Yukimasa Ida, and architect Tsuyoshi Tane, where his view and words captured by the guest artists could be experienced by the visitors. Exhibition ran from December 8, 2023, to January 18, 2024.

== Other ==
=== Photobook ===
Jun Matsumoto 20220830-20231026 The records of days of living as Ieyasu (release 19 December 2023)

== Social media ==
Matsumoto opened an Instagram account in December 2022 to promote his upcoming taiga "Dou suru Ieyasu", activities related to it, as well as some personal posts via Instagram Stories. On May 12, 2024, he changed the account's name and icon, to reflect his current activities, and via an Instagram Stories post, he warned fans and followers that he does not have any other account except for the Instagram one, as there are several fake accounts appearing in X (formerly Twitter) claiming to be him.

== Private life ==
Matsumoto has been shipped with Mao Inoue since their Hana Yori Dango series appearances. There have been reports of meetings, sightings and dates, all covered by all kinds of sites, both in the mainstream as well as gossip sites. However, Inoue herself denied any kind of rumors of marriage in a TV appearance in 2024. However rumors of their marriage arose again after Arashi's end of activities in May 2026.

== Multiple nicknames ==
According to former classmate and fellow actor Ryuhei Matsuda, in High School, Matsumoto was called Darth Vader by his classmates. On the September 14, 2017 Arashi program "Arashi ni Shiyagare" episode, where this was revealed, fellow member Kazunari Ninomiya commented that then fellow Johnny Tomohisa Yamashita, who was their junior, often called him "King", nickname that was affirmed by Matsumoto's portrayal of Domyouji on Hana Yori Dango

The public nickname MJ, with widespread use since the 'Arashi ni Shiyagare" section "This is MJ" started on April 11, 2015, has its probable origin in the 2007 Arashi concert "Time", where Matsumoto, for his solo song "Yabai, yabai, yabai", performed the so–called "MJ Walk", where he walked upside down while suspended by wires.

Ninomiya has called him "MatsuJun", "Massan", "Jun–kun", "MJ" and "J", this last one as mentioned by Ninomiya on the February 7, 2015 Arashi ni Shiyagare episode, was inspired while reading Sakigake!! Otokojuku. The character J, who had thick eyebrows, reminded him of Matsumoto (Matsumoto also has thick eyebrows). Regarding the use of "J" as his first nickname, Ninomiya stated that, since he and Matsumoto are basically the same age (difference of 2 months) and their start in the agency was close, he didn't know what to call him, so he called Matsumoto "J" while everyone else called him "MatsuJun". On the December 11, 2016, episode of his radio program "Bay Storm", Ninomiya confessed that he loved being the only one calling Matsumoto "J", but as this was no longer the case (at this time), he chose to call him "Jun kun" and "Massan". But those are not the only nicknames he has called him. Ninomiya also started calling him "Emperor" on Arashi's program "Himitsu no Arashi chan" corner's "Mannequin Five Spring Break Special Episode" aired March 31, 2011, as well as jokingly calling him by nicknames based on activities or situations Matsumoto was going through at the moment of the filming of their programs, such as "AtsuJun" (as Matsumoto was grilling some meat, he constantly was saying "atsu" (hot)), nickname that was "revived" by Masaki Aiba on a Mitsuya Cider commercial in 2020,

== Commercials ==
(CM)

- Asahi Group Holdings, Ltd.
  - Asahi Soft Drinks "Mitsuya Cider" (2020) with Arashi
- Au by KDDI
  - Au by KDDI (2011)
  - Android Au (2011) - co-star with all Arashi members
  - Au Box (2008)
- Bandai
  - たまごっち オスっちメスっち (Tamagotchi Osutchi Mesutchi) (1999)
- Daiichi Sankyo
  - Lulu Attack cold medicine (2018 - 2019, 2022)
- Daio Paper
  - Elleair + Water (2010 - 2017)
- Hitachi
  - Home appliances (2010 - 2019) (By himself, and co-starring Arashi members, both as individuals and as a whole team)
- House Foods
  - さわやか吐息 スーパーカテキン (Sawayaka toiki sūpākatekin) (2004)
- Japan Airlines (2021 - 2023) With fellow Arashi member Sho Sakurai
- Japan Post
  - New Year's postcard campaign (2015–2020, as part of Arashi), (2019–2020, individual)
  - special set of stamps for sale in Aichi, Shizuoka, Gifu, Mie, Ibaraki, and Tochigi prefectures (for drama "What to do, Ieyasu") (for Tokai Post, 2023)
- KFC Japan
  - Pot Pie and Chicken Box (2009)
  - Tomato Cream Pot Pie (2010)
  - Chicken Cream Pot Pie, Tomato Cream Pot Pie with Shrimp (2011)
- Kikkoman
  - うちのごはん (Uchi no gohan) (2017 - 2020)
- Kirin Holdings
  - Kirin Brewery
    - Tanrei Green Label (2010 - 2013) - Co-star with Satoshi Ohno and Masaki Aiba (later joined by Kazunari Ninomiya and Sho Sakurai)
  - Kirin Beverages
    - Afternoon Tea Delicious Sugar-free (2016)
    - Mets "Mets Men" (2016) - By himself and co-starring Masaki Aiba and Satoshi Ohno
- Kosé Corporation
  - Kosé Cosmetics
    - Fasio (2010 - 2013)
  - Kosé Cosmeport
    - Je l'aime (2013 - 2020) - By himself and co-starring with Masaki Aiba
    - Savon de Bouquet (2014 -)
- Meiji Seika
  - Meiji Milk Chocolate (2011 - 2021)
  - Meiji The Chocolate (2014)
  - Crispies (2012)
  - Mountain of mushrooms · Village of bamboo shoots (2013 - 2019)
- Misawa Home (1998)
- NHK New satellite channels BS and BSP4K's CM personality (2023)
- Nintendo
  - Mario Kart 7 (2010)
  - Mario Kart Wii (2010) - Co-star with Kazunari Ninomiya
  - Donkey Kong Returns (2010) - Co-star with Sho Sakurai
  - Wii Party (2010) - Co-star with all Arashi members
  - 3Ds
- Osaka-Kansai Expo (2025) pavilion "Earth Mart" opening video (Expo exclusive)
- Recruit
  - Hot Pepper Beauty (2011)
  - Suumo (2022)
- Sagawa Express
  - Sagawa Express Transport and Logistics "NEXT! SAGAWA" (2022–2023, 2025)
- Shandong Ruyi (China)
  - Renown Corporation (Japan) / Aquascutum brand trench coats
- Suntory
  - Pepsi Nex (2008)

== Filmography ==
=== TV drama ===
Year	Title	Role	Notes	Ref.
1997	Hoken Chōsa-in Shigarami Tarō no Jikenbo	Shunichi Yoneda	TV special 3, "Sanuki Satsujin Jiken"	
1997	Bokura no Yūki: Miman Toshi	Mori		
1997	Another Heart (もうひとつの心臓, Mō hitotsu no shinzō)[ja]	Tōru Kitamura	Saturday drama	
1998	Boys Be... Jr.	Yū	Episode 1: "Hakunetsu! Ren'ai Shitai Shōkōgun"; Lead role	
1998	Hitsuyō no Nai Hito (必要のない人)[ja]	Takuji Ohno	Wednesday drama	
1999	Nekketsu Ren'ai-dō	Retsu Nikaidō / Kōsuke Fukunaga	"Case 2: Shishi-za no A-gata BOY" / "Case 11: Futagoza no B-gata BOY"; Lead role	
1999	Kowai Nichiyōbi: Furugiya	S	Episode 10 guest appearance	
1999	V no Arashi	Jun Matsumoto	Lead role with Arashi members	
2000	Shijō Saiaku no Dēto	Yūsuke	Episode: "Poor Boy vs Rich Lady"; Lead role	
2001	Mukai Arata no Dōbutsu Nikki	Hajime Kindaichi	Guest appearance	
2001	Kindaichi Shōnen no Jikenbo 3 / Majutsu Ressha Satsujin Jiken	Hajime Kindaichi	Lead role with Anne Suzuki	
2001	Kindaichi Shōnen no Jikenbo 3	Hajime Kindaichi	Lead role with Anne Suzuki	
2002	Gokusen	Shin Sawada	Lead role	
2002	Gokusen Returns: Sōshūhen & Shiwasu no Yankumi SP	Shin Sawada	Lead role	
2003	Yoiko no Mikata	Shin Sawada	Episode 9 guest appearance	
2003	Gokusen SP	Shin Sawada	Lead role, TV special	
2003	Kimi wa Petto	Momo/Takeshi Goda	Lead role	
2005	Propose	Satō Kōsuke	Lead role, mini-drama, "Story One"	
2005	Hana Yori Dango	Dōmyōuji Tsukasa	Lead role with Mao Inoue	
2006	Yonimo Kimyona Monogatari	Takada Kazuo	Lead role, mini-drama, "Imakiyo-san"	
2007	Hana Yori Dango Returns	Dōmyōuji Tsukasa	Lead role	
2007	Bambino!	Shogo Ban	Lead role	
2008	Myu no Anyo Papa ni Ageru	Hayato Yamaguchi	Lead role, TV special	
2009	Smile	Vito Hayakawa	Lead role with Yui Aragaki	
2010	Saigo no Yakusoku	Nozomu Gotō	Lead role with Arashi members, TV special	
2010	Wagaya no Rekishi	Yoshio Yame	Three-part TV special	
2010	Kaibutsu-kun	Kaibutsu-kun's butler	Episode 9 guest appearance	
2010	Natsu no Koi wa Nijiiro ni Kagayaku	Taiga Kusunoki	Lead role	
2011	Bartender	Himself	Guest appearance	
2012	Mou Yuukai Nante Shinai	Shuntarō Tokita	Guest appearance	
2012	Lucky Seven	Shuntarō Tokita	Lead role	
2013	Lucky Seven SP	Shuntarō Tokita	Lead role	
2013	Hajimari no Uta SP	Wataru	Lead role	
2014	Shitsuren Chocolatier	Sōta Koyurugi	Lead role	
2016	99.9 Criminal Lawyer	Hiroto Miyama	Lead role	
2017	Bokura no Yūki: Miman Toshi SP	Mori (Mori Eguchi)		
2018	99.9 Criminal Lawyer – Season II	Hiroto Miyama	Lead role	
2018	Hana Nochi Hare~Hanadan Next Season~	Dōmyōuji Tsukasa	Episode 1 guest appearance	
2019	Eien no Nishipa~Hokkaido to Nazuketa Otoko Matsuura Takeshiro kara~	Takeshiro Matsuura	Lead role, NHK TV special	
2022	My Neighbor, Chikara	Chikara Nakagoshi	Lead role	
2022	The 13 Lords of the Shogun	Tokugawa Ieyasu	Cameo appearance, taiga drama	
2023	What Will You Do, Ieyasu?	Tokugawa Ieyasu	Lead role, taiga drama	
2025	The 19th Medical Chart	Akira Tokushige	Lead role	
2026	Song of the Samurai	Matsudaira Katamori		

=== Movies ===
Year	Title	Role	Ref.	Notes
1998	Shinjuku Shōnen Tanteidan	Kentaro Kanzaki	co-starring with You Yokoyama, Masaki Aiba, Kyoko Fukada, Ai Kato, and Ayana Sakai	
2002	Pikanchi Life is Hard Dakedo Happy	Rentarō Futaba (Bon)		
2004	Pikanchi Life Is Hard Dakara Happy	Rentarō Futaba (Bon)		
2005	Tokyo Tower	Kōji		
2007	Boku wa Imōto ni Koi o Suru	Yori Yūki	Lead role with Nana Eikura	
2007	Kiiroi Namida	Yūji Katsumada	Lead role with Arashi members	
2008	Kakushi Toride no San'akunin: The Last Princess	Takezo	Lead role with Masami Nagasawa	
2008	Hana Yori Dango Final	Domyouji Tsukasa	Lead role with Mao Inoue	
2013	Girl in the Sunny Place / aka "Hidamari no Kanojo"	Okuda Kosuke	Lead role	
2014	Pikanchi Life is Hard Tabun Happy	Rentarō Futaba (Bon)	Lead role with Arashi members	
2017	Narratage	Takashi Hayama	Lead role	
2021	99.9 Criminal Lawyer: The Movie	Hiroto Miyama	Lead role	

== Stage ==
Year	Title	Role	Notes	Ref
1997	Stand By Me	Teddy		
1997	Kyo to Kyo			
2004	West Side Story	Bernardo		
2005	East of Eden	Carl Trask	Lead role	
2006	Byakuya no Valkyrie	Sasuke Kūhibi	Lead role	
2011	Aa, Kōya	Shinji Shinjuku	Lead role	
2024	Sei sankaku kankei (Love in Action)	Karamatsu	Lead role	

== Discography ==
=== Musical contributions ===
Are You Happy? song "Drive" (recording under Matsumoto's supervision)

== Awards and nominations ==
Year	Organization	Award	Work	Result
2002	33rd Television Drama Academy Awards	Best Supporting Actor	Gokusen	Won
2005	47th Television Drama Academy Awards	Best Supporting Actor	Hana Yori Dango	Won
2007	10th Nikkan Sports Drama Grand Prix (Winter)	Best Supporting Actor	Hana Yori Dango 2	Won
2007	53rd Television Drama Academy Awards	Best Actor	Bambino!	Won
2007	11th Nikkan Sports Drama Grand Prix (Spring)	Best Actor	Bambino!	Nominated
2008	GQ Japan Men of the Year 2008 Awards	GQ Man of the Year 2008 (Note: Matsumoto was one of the six honorees for GQ Men of the Year 2008.)	Hana Yori Dango series	Won
2009	13th Nikkan Sports Drama Grand Prix (Spring)	Best Actor	Smile	Won
2009	61st Television Drama Academy Awards	Best Actor	Smile	Nominated
2010	VOCE Beauty Awards Grand Prix 2010	Best Beauty CM Award	Kose Fasio "Mascara Liner"	Won
2010	14th Nikkan Sports Drama Grand Prix (Summer)	Best Actor	Natsu no Koi wa Nijiiro ni Kagayaku	Won
2012	72nd Television Drama Academy Awards	Best Actor	Lucky Seven	Won
2014	Movie Plus Awards 2013	Best Actor	Girl in the Sunny Place	Won
2014	Movie Plus Awards 2013	Best Couple (with Ueno Juri)	Girl in the Sunny Place	Won
2014	80th Television Drama Academy Awards	Best Actor	Shitsuren Chocolatier	Won
2014	17th Nikkan Sports Drama Grand Prix (Winter)	Best Actor	Shitsuren Chocolatier	Won
2016	89th Television Drama Academy Awards	Best Actor	99.9 Criminal Lawyer	Nominated
2016	TV Station Awards	Best Actor	99.9 Criminal Lawyer	Won
2018	21st Nikkan Sports Drama Grand Prix (Winter)	Best Actor	99.9 Criminal Lawyer – Season II	Won
2018	96th Television Drama Academy Awards	Best Actor	99.9 Criminal Lawyer – Season II	Won
