= Smile (Japanese TV series) =

- スマイル
- Genre: Drama; Romance
- Directed by: Ishii Yasuharu; Toshio Tsuboi
- Starring: Jun Matsumoto; Yui Aragaki; Kiichi Nakai; Shun Oguri
- Theme music composer: Kosuke Yamashita
- Opening theme: Ariamaru Tomi by Ringo Sheena
- Country of origin: Japan
- Original language: Japanese
- No. of episodes: 11 episodes

Production
- Producers: Katsuaki Setoguchi; Mahoko Takanari
- Production location: Japan

Original release
- Network: Tokyo Broadcasting System
- Release: April 17 – June 26, 2009

Smile (スマイル, Sumairu) is a television drama series, broadcast by TBS from April to June 2009. Jun Matsumoto plays the lead role of Vito, a half-Filipino, half-Japanese man who always smiles despite all of the problems and difficulties he faces. The series focused on foreigners and mixed race children who suffered from racism.

== Synopsis ==
Vito Hayakawa has a Filipino father and a Japanese mother, but he was born and raised in Japan and has never visited the Philippines. The ever-smiling Vito works at Machimura Foods during the day, and at night, he works a part-time job trying to make his dreams come true. One day during an incident at a book store, he meets a girl named Hana Mishima, who lost her ability to speak due to an accident. But even though she can't speak, Vito is drawn to her beautiful smile. However, Vito becomes wrongly suspected by the police for a crime, and after meeting the lawyer Kazuma Ito, the issue begins to grow... Together, Vito, Hana, and Kazuma will go through challenging times and have to overcome many obstacles.

== Cast ==
- Jun Matsumoto as Vito Hayakawa
- Yui Aragaki as Hana Mishima
- Eiko Koike as Shiori Machimura
- Hidenori Tokuyama as Kinta Kawai
- Suzunosuke as Kenji Kazima
- Hiroyuki Ikeuchi as Detective Takayanagi
- Kiichi Nakai as Kazuma Ito
- Masanobu Katsumura as Keisuke Kashiwagi
- Gin Maeda as Sosuke Machimura
- Ayumi Ishida as Midori Machimura
- Toshiyuki Kitami as Detective Furuse
- Shun Oguri as Seiji Hayashi

=== Awards and nominations ===
13th Nikkan Sports Drama Grand Prix

Spring Awards 2009

- Best Drama: Smile
- Best Actor: Jun Matsumoto
- Best Supporting Actor: Kiichi Nakai
- Best Supporting Actress: Yui Aragaki

== See also ==
- Hana Yori Dango
- Arashi
- Bambino!
- Gokusen
- Filipinos in Japan
