= Hana yori Dango Final: The Movie =

- Poster advertising this film in Singapore
- Japanese: 花より男子(だんご)F(ファイナル)
- Literal meaning: Boys Over Flowers Final
Transcriptions
- Romanization: Hana yori Dango Fainaru
- Directed by: Yasuharu Ishii
- Screenplay by: Mikio Satake
- Based on: Boys Over Flowers by Yoko Kamio
- Produced by: Katsuaki Setoguchi; Shinichi Sanju
- Starring: Mao Inoue; Jun Matsumoto; Shun Oguri; Shota Matsuda; Tsuyoshi Abe
- Narrated by: Mao Inoue
- Cinematography: Toshiyasu Yamanaka
- Music by: Kosuke Yamashita
- Distributed by: Toho
- Release date: June 28, 2008
- Running time: 131 minutes
- Country: Japan
- Language: Japanese
- Box office: ¥7.75 billion (Japan)

Hana yori Dango Final: The Movie (花より男子(だんご)F(ファイナル), Hana yori Dango Fainaru) is a 2008 Japanese film directed by Yasuharu Ishii and starring Mao Inoue and Jun Matsumoto. It is the last part of the Japanese live-action Boys Over Flowers trilogy, based on the manga series by Yoko Kamio. It is marketed internationally as Boys Over Flowers Final or Boys Over Flowers: The Movie and released in some Asian countries as the latter.

The film was released on June 28, 2008, and was subsequently released in Hong Kong, Singapore, and South Korea. It was released direct-to-DVD in Northern America in 2009, making it the first and, for 13 years, only part of the Japanese live-action adaptation with a Western English-subtitled release (the preceding TV series was not released as such until April 2022).

== Plot ==
Tsukasa Dōmyōji (Jun Matsumoto) and Tsukushi Makino (Mao Inoue) are driving through Nevada. Weeks prior, Tsukasa announced to the world that he was engaged to Tsukushi. He released an embarrassing picture of her eating noodles, angering her. As a result of the announcement, Tsukushi's family become targets of media attention.

Soon after, Tsukushi's parents formally met with Kaede Dōmyōji (Mariko Kaga), Tsukasa's mother, to discuss the wedding. Kaede presented Tsukushi with a tiara which is supposed to grant endless love to the owner and her partner. At the Hotel Volver, the couple are about to kiss when a man crashes through the window and seizes the tiara. Tsukasa pursues the thief with Tsukushi far behind, but the thief manages to escape. Tsukushi and Tsukasa return to their room, where they notice that the window has been fixed. The staff claim they heard no disturbance, even though Tsukasa and the thief have created chaos throughout the hotel. After some investigation, Tsukasa's secretary Nishida (David Ito) informs him that the thief may be in Las Vegas. Tsukasa and Tsukushi secretly plan to go there.

Rui (Shun Oguri) phones Shizuka Tōdō (Mayumi Sada) just before her wedding. He states that he has many things to move on from. Tsukasa visits Rui to inform him of his plans. Rui asks why he did not contact Sōjirō Nishikado (Shota Matsuda) or Akira Mimasaka (Tsuyoshi Abe) instead, but Tsukasa tells him that they are busy.

Tsukushi and Tsukasa finally arrive in Las Vegas. They check into a motel before going to a casino, a location where Nishida told them the thief might be. They meet Shigeru Okawahara (Natsuki Katō), who reveals that she is seeing Kazu Kaburagi (Naohito Fujiki), the heir of a large company that owns the hotel where the tiara was stolen. Tsukasa questions Kaburagi; he says that he was told to pretend nothing happened at the Hotel. In return for his cooperation, five million USD was deposited into his account. Kaburagi claims he does not know the thief.

Back at the motel, Akira calls Tsukasa and informs him that the tiara will go on the black market in Hong Kong. Tsukushi and Tsukasa then plan to head there before Kaburagi arrives, saying that he heard about the auction. He gives them the five million to help them get the tiara back. Tsukushi and Tsukasa gamble the money at the roulette table in order to pay Kaburagi back. As the wheel is spinning, the two notice the thief and Tsukasa chases him by jumping over the table, causing the ball to land next to the winning space. The thief gets away and Tsukushi is thrown out of the casino for refusing to hand over the money. Outside, she reunites with Tsukasa and the rest of F4, who Tsukasa has called.

The five fly to Hong Kong in a private jet for the auction. They win the tiara back. Tsukushi, still questioning if she should or not marry, sees Rui talking to the thief. She tells Tsukasa, but he does not believe her, and the two fight. The next day, Tsukushi boards the private jet, finding Tsukasa already there. They are still on bad terms. A flight attendant serves them spiked champagne, the two pass out and the thief steals the tiara again.

They awake on an island where they wait for help. They realize that their wild goose chase around the world is similar to the story behind the tiara. After talking with Kaburagi about why he divorced his wife, Tsukushi asks Tsukasa what his dream is. He points at her. Just as Tsukushi is about to tell her dream in return, a helicopter arrives to pick them up. They arrive at an estate and confront the man who they saw at the auction. He is an old friend of Kaoru Dōmyōji, who was who asked him to do it. Tsukasa can't believe his mother was capable of such a thing, and gets angry at her. It is then revealed that the tiara plot, a ruse to ensure that their marriage would be happy, was thought of by Tsukushi's parents, who asked Kaoru for her help. Everyone involved was part of the act. They finally marry in Ebisu, Tokyo.

One year later, Sōjirō is a renowned tea master releasing a book, Akira is meeting with his fellow underground men, and Tsukasa and Tsukushi are back on the uninhabited island. As they write "Love" on the beach, Tsukasa asks Tsukushi what her dream is; she places her hand over her stomach and says that it has come true. Overjoyed, Tsukasa listens to her stomach. Meanwhile, Rui has finally moved on from Shizuka and Tsukushi as he places a picture of Tsukushi and F4 on his windowsill.

== Cast ==
Info

Actor	Role	Ref.
Mao Inoue	Tsukushi Makino	
Jun Matsumoto	Tsukasa Dōmyōji (F4)	
Shun Oguri	Rui Hanazawa (F4)	
Shota Matsuda	Sōjirō Nishikado (F4)	
Tsuyoshi Abe	Akira Mimasaka (F4)	
Naohito Fujiki	Kazu Kaburagi	
Mako Ishino	Chieko Makino	
David Ito	Nishida	
Mariko Kaga	Kaede Dōmyōji	
Natsuki Katō	Shigeru Okawahara	
Kin'ya Kitaōji	the mysterious gentleman	
Susumu Kobayashi	Haruo Makino	
Emiko Matsuoka	Minako Yamano	
Nanako Matsushima	Tsubaki Dōmyōji	
Aki Nishihara	Yūki Matsuoka	
Mayumi Sada	Shizuka Tōdō	
Megumi Sato	Sakurako Sanjo	
Satoshi Tomiura	Susumu Makino	
Shingo Tsurumi	Ken Uchida	
Exile Akira	Sunny	

== Production ==
=== Filming ===
In August 2007, TBS announced that their live-action adaptation of Hana yori Dango would end with a film. Filming was scheduled to take place overseas for about two months from January 2008 onwards. It was also announced that the series' chief director, Yasuharu Ishii, would return to direct the film, and the original manga writer and illustrator Yoko Kamio would help Mikio Satake (the pen name of actor Takayuki Takuma) with the screenwriting.

Mao Inoue and Jun Matsumoto had traveled to Hong Kong from February 11 to 16, 2008, then to Las Vegas on February 19 before finishing on February 29. The cast had traveled 25,000 kilometers (approx. 16,000 miles) between the two locations.

=== Music ===
On May 2, 2008, Jun Matsumoto's group, Arashi, sang the film's theme song "One Love", as they did for the series' two television drama adaptations.

Japanese singer Aiko provided the insert song to the movie. Though the insert song was referred to as "Tsukushi's Theme Song" at the time of the announcement, it is officially titled "KissHug".

== Release ==
=== Promotion ===
After a special press conference for the movie was held at the Nippon Budokan on June 23, 2008, it was announced that TBS was going to air a one-hour special on June 27 at 10:00 JST. The special consisted of a mini-episode, filmed before the press conference, that took place just before the story line of the movie, and a semi-live broadcast with Arashi performing the Hana yori Dango theme song medley and the movie's primary cast members making an appearance as their respective characters.

When the movie was released in theaters, Mao Inoue and the cast of F4 flew in a Boeing 737-500 to visit Sapporo, Nagoya, and Fukuoka on July 12 and Osaka and Tokyo on July 13 to meet with fans. Such a campaign was a first for a Japanese film.

=== Box office ===
The film opened on 400 screens across Japan. In the movie's first five days since its release, it was watched by approximately 1.35 million people, grossing more than 1.6 billion Japanese yen. It stayed at number one at the Japanese box office for three consecutive weekends and stayed in the top ten for ten weekends. It became the highest-grossing Japanese live-action film of 2008, with a domestic Japanese gross of ¥7.75 billion

==== International ====
Overseas, the film grossed $1,422,204 from six Asian countries, including Hong Kong, Malaysia, Singapore, South Korea, Taiwan, and Thailand.

=== DVD release ===
A month after the DVD release, the DVD achieved the second-highest opening week sales in Japanese movie history, ranking second on the list of 2008's top box office hits. It sold 13,000 copies in its fourth week since release, making it also its fourth consecutive week as the number one Japanese live-action film. Additionally, by selling a total of 308,000 then, it became the third best-selling Japanese live-action movie DVD of all time.

According to Oricon, Hana yori Dango Final was the best-selling movie DVD for the first half of 2009 and the second best-selling DVD in the general DVD category. By the end of 2009, it sold a total of 358,172 copies, ranking as the fourth best-selling DVD in the Oricon general DVD category and the second best-selling movie DVD after Ponyo.

==== International ====
The film was released direct-to-DVD in North America on August 25, 2009, by Discotek Media, making it the first and, as of March 2022, only Japanese live-action media based on Boys Over Flowers with a Western English-subtitled release.

== Awards and nominations ==
Award	Category	Nominee	Result
3rd Asian Film Awards	Best Newcomer	Shota Matsuda	Nominated
Nikkan Sports Film Award	Yujiro Ishihara New Artist Award	Shota Matsuda	Won

== See also ==
- Boys Over Flowers
- Boys Over Flowers (2005 TV series)
- Boys Over Flowers 2
