= Satoshi Tomiura =

Japanese actor and tarento (born 1991)

- 冨浦 智嗣
- Born: 15 May 1991 (age 34); Tokushima Prefecture, Japan
- Occupations: Actor; singer; tarento
- Years active: 2004–2018; 2023-present
- Television: Kinpachi-sensei 7th Series; Hiroshima Showa 20 nen 8 Gatsu Muika; Hana Yori Dango; Hana Yori Dango Returns; Aji Ichi Monme

Satoshi Tomiura (冨浦 智嗣, Tomiura Satoshi; born 15 May 1991 in Tokushima, Tokushima) is a Japanese actor and tarento. He is represented with Stardust Promotion (formerly represented with Hoei TV Production). He is nicknamed Shī-chan (しーちゃん).

== Filmography ==
=== TV drama ===
Year	Title	Role	Network	Notes	Ref.
2004	Kinpachi-sensei	Masato Nakamura	TBS		
2005	Hiroshima Showa 20 nen 8 Gatsu Muika	Toshiaki Yajima	TBS		
2005	Hana Yori Dango	Susumu Makino	TBS		
2006	Rondo	Ryota Kobayashi	TBS		
2007	Hana Yori Dango Returns	Susumu Makino	TBS		
2007	Watashitachi no Kyōkasho	Riku Kaneyoshi	Fuji TV		
2007	Kosodate no Tensai	Keita Daikoku	Fuji TV		
2008	Tokyo Girl: Rio Yamashita	Atsushi Kanda	BS-TBS	Episode 1	
2008	Taiyo to Umi no Kyoshitsu	Yamato Kusunoki	Fuji TV		
2009	Voice	Akiyuki Kubo	Fuji TV	Episode 6	
2009	Tsubasa	Tomoaki Tamaki	NHK		
2010	Bukatsu Dō: Sakura no En		WOWOW		
2010	Tumbling	Satoshi Tsuchiya	TBS		
2011	Aji Ichi Monme	Honda	TV Asahi		
2011	Yō wa mata Noboru	Yasumasa Seo	TV Asahi		
2012	Kurohyou 2 Ryūgagotoku: Ashura-hen	Tamotsu Saito	MBS, TBS		
2012	Taira no Kiyomori	Emperor Nijō	NHK		
2013	Vampire Heaven	Kentaro	TV Tokyo		
2014	Owakon TV	Shoji Kinoshita	NHK BS Premium	Agency for Cultural Affairs Art Festival's participation work	
2015	Sono Otoko, Ishiki Takai Kei.	Aoi Sugimoto	NHK BS Premium		

=== Documentaries ===
Year	Title	Network
2014	Chikyū Ichiban: Sekai Saidai no Sabaku no Saiten Burning Man Festival	NHK

=== Variety ===
Year	Title	Network	Notes
2005	Love*Riruka	Tokyo MX	
2008	Sanma no Super karakuri TV	TBS	As Tara-chan of Sazae All-Stars; Trainee; Part of percussion
2010	Little Charo 2: Eigo ni Koisuru Monogatari	NHK-E	Monthly guest
2013	run for money Tōsō-chū / battle for money Sentō-chū	Fuji TV	As Saku Shutsuki
2013	Haiku saku Saku!	NHK-E	
2014	VS Arashi: Samurai Hustle Team	Fuji TV	
2014	Tetsudō Kikō: Nippon burari Tetsudō Tabi	NHK BS Premium	Traveler; Episodes 20 and 46

=== Films ===
Year	Title	Role
2006	Aoi uta: No do Jiman Seishun-hen	Ryota Yamazaki
2006	Sun Scarred	Ryo
2007	Tokyo Tower: Mom and Me, and Sometimes Dad	Boku (high school age)
2008	Boku-tachi to Chūzai-san no 700-nichi Sensō	Jamie
2008	Hana Yori Dango Final	Susumu Makino
2009	Dare mo Mamotte kurenai	Tatsuro Sonobe
2011	Someday	Raine Daichi
2011	Ōsama Game	Shota Yahiro
2014	Samurai Hustle	Kotaro Kosaka

=== Photo albums ===
Year	Title	Notes
2005	Shōnen Haiyū	Volume 1
2006	Gaku Hamada & Satoshi Tomiura - Special Photo Book: Aoi uta	
2007	Real G	Volumes 1 and 2

=== Magazines ===
Year	Title	Notes
	Myojo	
2009	TV Station	No. 14

=== Stage ===
Year	Title	Role	Ref.
2005	Kumori Ichiji Ōarashi nochi Sakura		
2014	Shuppatsu		
2015	Dai Gyakusō		
2016	Ne Tora re Munesuke	Tommy	

=== Internet ===
Year	Title	Role	Website
2011	Blizzard	Gaku Takehisa	BeeTV

=== Music videos ===
Title
Matsuriruka & Alice "Love Riruka"
Greeeen "Haruka"

== See also ==
- 3B's members (Kinpachi-sensei's dance unit during the seventh series)
  - Kojiro Suzuki – Kota Yabu
