= Mayumi Sada =

Japanese model and actress

- 佐田 真由美
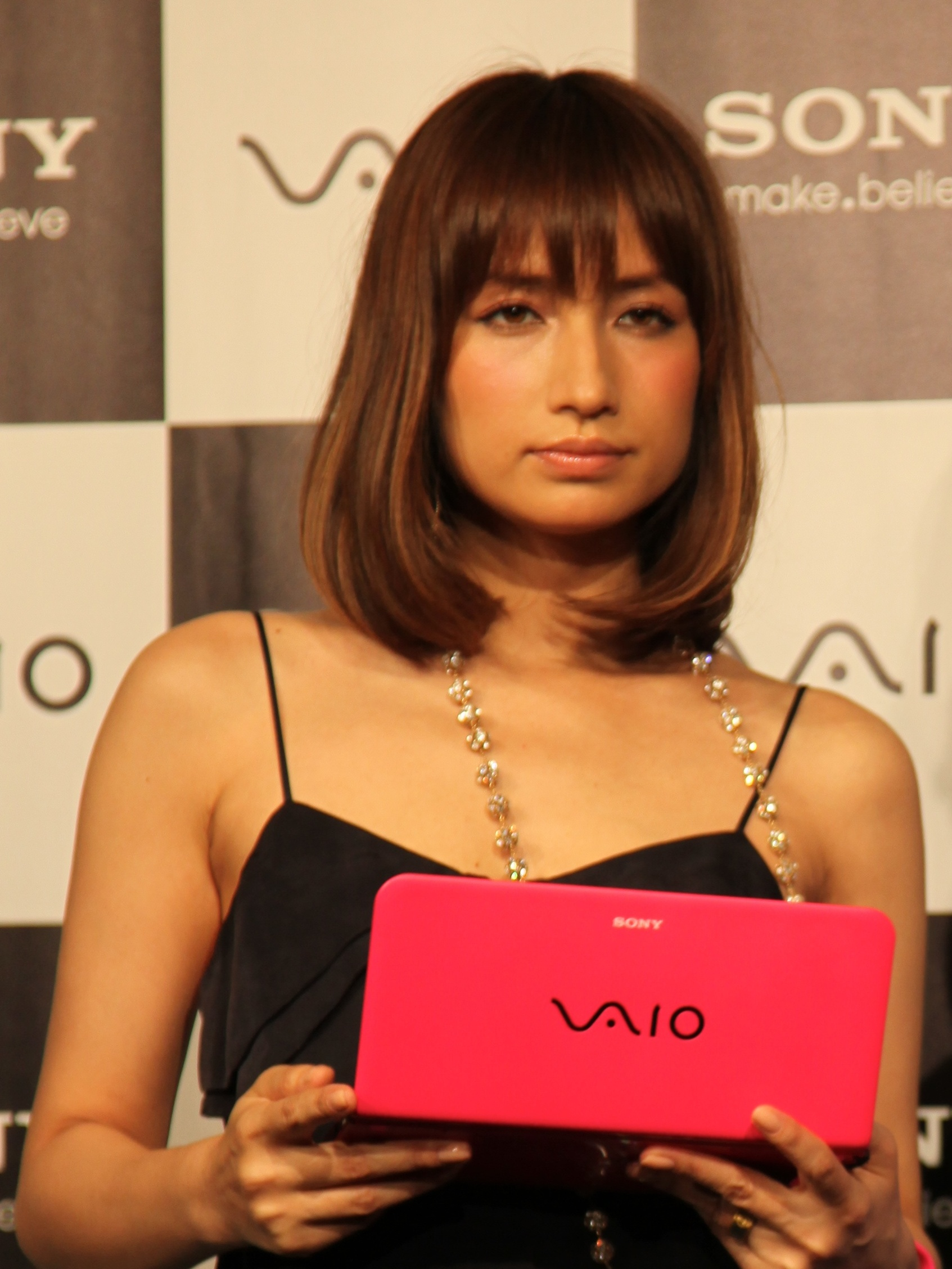
- Mayumi Sada
- Born: August 23, 1977 (age 49); Tokyo, Japan
- Other name: Mayumin (まゆみん)
- Occupations: Model, actress
- Years active: 2003–present
- Agent: LDH
- Height: 1.66 m (5 ft 5 in) (2013)
- Spouse: Kunichi Nomura (m. 2008)
- Children: 2

Mayumi Sada (佐田 真由美, Sada Mayumi; born August 23, 1977, in Tokyo, Japan) is a Japanese model and actress. Her maternal grandfather is an American.

== Early life ==
Sada begin modeling when she was three years old.

== Career ==
In 1998, she became an exclusive model for the fashion magazine Vivi.

In 2001, Sada released her debut single "Pray/discovery". In 2003, her acting debut was in the film, Tenshi no Kiba B.T.A.. In 2006, Sada launched her jewelry brand, Enasoluna.

On October 1, 2008, she married Kunichi Nomura. On April 6, 2009, they gave birth to their first child. They later gave birth to another child on November 4, 2010.

== Filmography ==
=== TV series ===
Year	Title	Role	Network	Notes
2005	One Missed Call	Satsuki Miyashita	TV Asahi	Episodes 5 and 6
2005	Hana Yori Dango	Shizuka Todo	TBS	
2006	Yoruō	Ageha	TBS	Episodes 6 and 7
2006	Tsubasa no Oreta Tenshi-tachi	Misa Hiraiwa	Fuji TV	Episode 1
2006	Shimokita Sundays	Chiemi Date	TV Asahi	
2006	Saikai ~Yokota Megumi-san no Negai~	Yaeko Taguchi	NTV	
2007	Hana Yori Dango Returns	Shizuka Todo	TBS	
2007	Papa to Musume no 7-kakan		TBS	
2007	Hataraki Man	Masami Araki	NTV	
2008	Puzzle	Erika Nishino	ABC, TV Asahi	Final Episode
2008	Prisoner	Aoi Matsumiya	WOWOW	
2011	Yonimo Kimyōna Monogatari Aki no Tokubetsu-hen: Mimikaki	Beauty target	Fuji TV	

=== Films ===
Year	Title	Role	Notes
2003	Tenshi no Kiba B.T.A.	Hatsumi Kanzaki	
2004	Casshern	Sagure	
2005	Kamen Rider: The First	Shocker executive	
2005	Henshin	Naoko Tachibana	
2007	Jigyaku no Uta	Akiko Morino	
2008	Kung Fu Kid	Black female teacher	
2008	Hana Yori Dango Final	Shizuka Todo	
2008	Ichi	Mitsu	
2008	The Handsome Suit	Raika	
2009	Goemon	Orin	
