= David Ito =

Japanese comedian, actor and businessman (born 1966)

- デビット 伊東
- Born: Tsutomu Itō; 12 August 1966 (age 60); Iruma, Saitama, Japan
- Other names: David; Debi
- Occupations: Actor; comedian
- Years active: 1991-present

Tsutomu Itō (伊藤 努, Itō Tsutomu; born August 12, 1966), known professionally as David "Debi" Ito (デビット 伊東, Debitto Itō), is a Japanese comedian, actor and businessman.

== Biography ==
Ito was born on August 12, 1966, in Iruma, Saitama.

After graduating from Sayama High School, he was a local swimming instructor, but he aimed for being an idol in Tokyo. During the showbub period, he lived in Hiromi's room. In 1986, together with Hiromi and Mister Chin, he formed the conte group B-21 Special. They won the Golden Arrow Award for Performing Arts in 1990.

After that, Ito planned to regenerate in which he had been as a sluggish celebrity within regular appearances in Tunnels no Namade Daradara ika sete!!, in the Fukuoka ramen shop "Ippudo" for training. At that time Ito was injured in his feet, as the above project was around when he was worried about continuing in the entertainment industry, he decided to retire from the front line of entertainment industry and started a ramen business. Currently there are six shop ramen shops named "Debitto" ("Debi" at the beginning) nationwide (Nakanobu Main Store, Sakurashinmachi Store, Ito-Yokado Yamato Tsurumi Store, Higashi Shizuoka Store, Sayama Store, Tachikawa Store), and two overseas stores (Macao shop ("Shinju shop"), Shanghai shop), he was doing research on soup on the second floor of the Nakanobu branch, and sometimes he stand at the store. The company consolidates opinions by the meeting three times a year by all employees. He temporarily stayed in ramen store management, but TBS' Seija no Kōshin co-star Chosuke Ikariya visited the shop without previous notice, even though a few words, "If I try to give back to the entertainment industry Having received a strong invitation with enthusiasm including "why did I not give back to the entertainment industry?", and in parallel with the ramen shop, he is doing a celebrity business such as an actor."

== Filmography ==
=== Television ===
Dates	Title	Role	Notes	Ref.
2005	Boys Over Flowers	Nishida		
2007	Boys Over Flowers 2	Nishida		
2018	Boys Over Flowers Season 2	Nishida		

=== Films ===
Year	Title	Role	Notes	Ref.
2023	Fly Me to the Saitama: From Biwa Lake with Love			
2026	All Our Tomorrows	Shingo Kushibiki		

=== Video games ===
Year	Title	Role	Ref.
2011	Yakuza: Dead Souls	Someya	
