= Kosuke Yamashita =

Japanese composer and arranger

Kosuke Yamashita 山下 康介
- Born: February 17, 1974 (age 52); Hamamatsu, Shizuoka, Japan
- Occupations: Composer, arranger
- Years active: 1996–present

Kosuke Yamashita (山下 康介, Yamashita Kōsuke; born February 17, 1974) is a Japanese composer and arranger from Hamamatsu, Shizuoka. Yamashita is best known for his work on Digimon Xros Wars, Xenosaga: The Animation, and the tokusatsu television series Mahou Sentai Magiranger, Kaizoku Sentai Gokaiger, and Kamen Rider Gaim. He is a member of Project.R.

Yamashita often collaborates with Nobuhiko Obayashi, as Yamashita met him soon after Yamashita graduated from the Tokyo College of Music.

He is a board member of the Japanese Composer Arranger Association. Since April 2011, Yamashita has been a guest lecturer at the Senzoku Gakuen College of Music. In 2013, released the album A Classical in collaboration with J-pop singer Ayumi Hamasaki. It was the first classical music album to top the Oricon album chart.

== Discography ==
Year	Title	Notes	Source
1996	Tom Cat Holmes' Deduction		
2005	Hana Yori Dango		
2005	Xenosaga: The Animation		
2006	Glass Fleet		
2006	Kurosagi		
2006	Xenosaga I & II		
2007	Getsumento Heiki Mina		
2007	Dragonaut		
2007	Shion no Ō		
2007	Hana Yori Dango Returns		
2008	R2: Reign of Revolution		
2008	Hana Yori Dango Final		
2009	Konnichiwa Anne		
2009	Smile		
2010–12	Digimon Fusion (Digimon Xros Wars)	3 seasons	
2010	The Wallflower	live-action TV drama	
2011–20	Chihayafuru	3 seasons	
2011	Kaizoku Sentai Gokaiger the Movie: The Flying Ghost Ship		
2012	Ozuma		
2014	Soredemo Sekai wa Utsukushii		
2016	Nurse Witch Komugi-chan R		
2016	Puzzle & Dragons X		
2022	Human Bug Daigaku		
2024	Dragon Ball Daima		
2026	A Gentle Noble's Vacation Recommendation		
