= Hiroshima Showa 20 nen 8 Gatsu Muika =

2005 Japanese television special

- Also known as: Hiroshima, August 6, Showa 20 (1945)
- Starring: Takako Matsu; Ai Kato; Masami Nagasawa; Tetsuji Tamayama; Masahiro Komoto; Aki Fukada; Kenjirō Ishimaru; Ken Mitsuishi; Konomi Morita; Shigeya Fugane; Shigeru Izumiya; Taichi Kokubun; Satoshi Tomiura; Toshiyuki Nishida
- Country of origin: Japan
- Original language: Japanese

Production
- Running time: 140 minutes

Original release
- Network: TBS
- Release: August 29, 2005

Hiroshima Showa 20 nen 8 Gatsu Muika (広島・昭和20年8月6日, Hiroshima Showa Nijyu nen Hachi Gatsu Muika) is a Japanese television special drama.

The story is about a family of three sisters and one brother with a dog living and running a Japanese Ryokan in Tenjin-cho, Hiroshima near Hiroshima Prefectural Industrial Promotion Hall.

The drama was made as the first drama of Nada So So Project by TBS for its 50th anniversary in 2005.

The drama has been awarded the 2006 best TV program award of "NAB Awards" from the Japan Commercial Broadcasters Association.

== Plot ==
In the summer 2005, an old gentleman began to talk about a "sixty years ago story" to the school study trip students in Hiroshima Peace Memorial Park.

It was a story about three sisters and one brother, when residents' houses, offices, shops restaurants, hospitals, schools, temples, hotels,... were used to be there in around the peace park.

Back to July 16, 1945, end of World War II, the town used to be called "Tenjin-cho", one of the towns in Hiroshima, there were people's life as the real town.

"Shinobu" as the eldest sister of Yajima family, was running her Yajima-Ryokan which was given from her dead parents. She was taking care of her younger sisters and a brother.

The second elder sister, "Nobuko" was teaching at primary school as a substitute teacher, she has wished to change something, even during the war.

The third sister, "Maki" was a high school student, was working hard for a factory as one of the mobilized students at wartime.

The youngest brother, "Toshiaki", loved flowers and animals, sweet, kind and good boy, but he had been called into the armed forces. He didn't wanted to show his fear to his sisters. But, only Shinobu had noticed that he was crying to his dog "Goro" at night. A boy who loved creatures, how come he had to go to the war.

And a few days later, after Toshiaki left his family, the light went off, but his dog gave them a feel better.

One day, Maki met a school girl "Mika" who was playing ballet at the factory. When Maki saw that Mika had treat badly by a factory officer, Maki took Mika's hand to escape from the factory.

Nobuko took her students to play in a mountain because she felt her students were got tired from their demolishing buildings for a firebreak. But, it was notified by a military police and then caught.

Shinobu tried to ask them Maki to free. At the time, Shinobu received a letter from "Michiaki" who asked Shinobu to get married with him.

And August 6 8:15 AM...

== Cast ==
- Takako Matsu as "Shinobu Yajima", the eldest sister of Yajima family, 28-year-old lady, after her parents died, she is running Yajima-Ryokan and taking care of her younger sisters and brother.
- Ai Kato as "Nobuko Yajima", the second sister, 22-year-old lady, a primary school substitute teacher, she was skeptical about the war, and an honest straight-talker, sometimes her words kept her sisters on tenterhooks.
- Masami Nagasawa as "Maki Yajima", the third and youngest sister, 18-year-old high school student, working for a factory at wartime, as an unspoilt girl, believing that the country will be won, and dreaming to be a ballet dancer.
- Satoshi Tomiura as younger "Toshiaki Yajima", the youngest brother, 15-year-old junior high school student, a tender boy loves creatures, his smile always makes his family happy.
- Tetsuji Tamayama as "Yasuhide Ohara", Nobuko's boy friend working at Hiroshima Prefectural Industrial Promotion Hall, wanting to get married with Nobuko soon, because of the situation of war.
- Aki Fukada as "Mika Kaneda", Maki's friend practicing ballet with Maki.
- Konomi Morita as Maki's class mate.
- Taichi Kokubun as "Michiaki Shigematsu", Shinobu's boy friend, a doctor's son and heir, proposed to Shinobu to get married after the war ended, coming back on a train to Hiroshima.
- Kenjirō Ishimaru as a military officer "Hirose".
- Masahiro Komoto as a factory officer.
- Ken Mitsuishi as a military soldier.
- Shigeru Izumiya as a post officer.
- Toshiyuki Nishida as elder "Toshiaki Yajima", an old gentleman talking to school students about the story of his family.
- Shigeya Fugane as a high school boy, listening to Toshiaki's story in Hiroshima Peace Park.

== Crew ==
- Script by Kazuhiko Yukawa
- Produced by Jun Nasuda
- Directed by Katsuo Fukuzawa

== Theme song ==
- Nada Soso
  - Sing by Rimi Natsukawa
  - Written by Ryoko Moriyama
  - Composed by Begin

== DVD ==
- DVD Released on August 2, 2006

== See also ==
- Japanese television programs
- Hiroshima Peace Memorial
- Jan Letzel
