= First Kiss (TV series) =

Japanese television series

- DVD cover
- Genre: Drama
- Written by: Yumiko Inoue
- Directed by: Hideki Takeuchi; Taisuke Kawamura; Kentarō Takagi
- Starring: Mao Inoue; Hideaki Itō; Yūta Hiraoka; Wakana Sakai
- Country of origin: Japan
- Original language: Japanese
- No. of episodes: 11

Production
- Producers: Hiroki Wakamatsu; Tsugi Shikanai
- Running time: 54 minutes

Original release
- Network: Fuji TV
- Release: 9 July – 17 September 2007

First Kiss (ファースト・キス, Faasuto Kisu) is a Japanese television drama series that aired on Fuji TV in 2007. Mao Inoue played the lead role for the first time in getsuku drama. The first episode received a viewership rating of 19.7%.

== Plot ==
A bitter-sweet and uplifting comedy drama about a young girl Mio and her brother Kazuki. To treat her illness overseas, Mio has been living away from her older brother Kazuki for the past ten years. After learning about the upcoming surgery, which she has only a fifty percent chance of survival, Mio decides to fly back to Japan to spend time with Kazuki. Looking forward to seeing his sweet younger sister, Kazuki anxiously awaits Mio's return in Japan. However, their reunion is nothing but full of surprises as Mio has transformed from the innocent sickly girl Kazuki remembers from ten years ago into a sassy woman with an attitude. Kazuki has difficulty dealing with his wickedly selfish younger sister, but soon learns about the truth of her medical condition and has a change of heart.

== Cast ==
- Mao Inoue as Mio Fukunaga
- Hideaki Itō as Kazuki Kanō
- Mari Natsuki as Rieko Fukunaga
- Yūta Hiraoka as Akio Yūki
- Wakana Sakai as Haruna Saitō
- Naoto Takenaka

Preceded by Operation Love; 16 April 2007 - 25 June 2007	Fuji TV Getsuku Drama; Mondays 21:00 - 21:54 (JST)	Succeeded by Galileo (15 October 2007 - 17 December 2007)
