= Mao Inoue =

Japanese actress and model (born 1987)

- 井上 真央
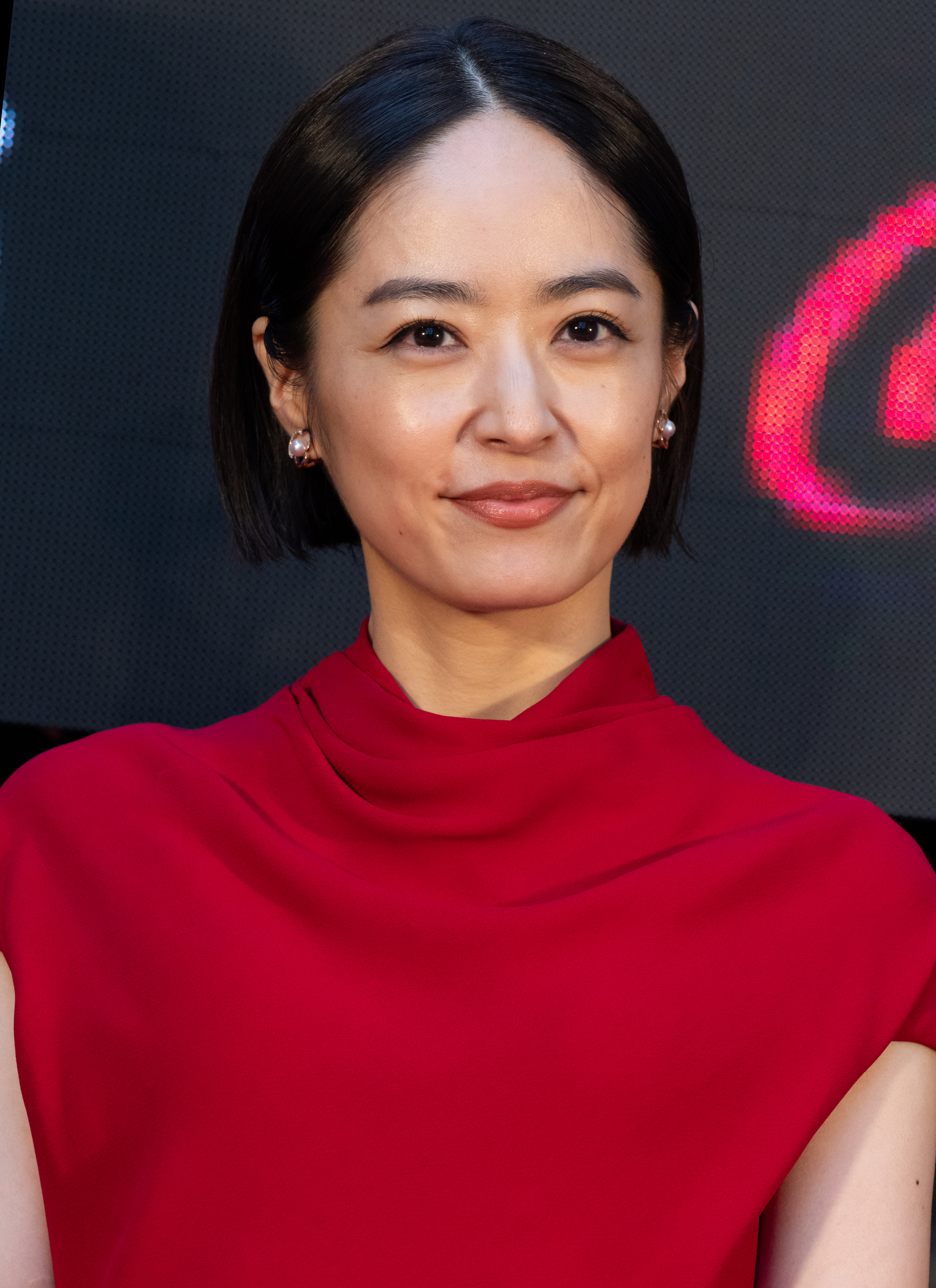
- Inoue at the 37th Tokyo International Film Festival in October 2024
- Born: 9 January 1987 (age 39); Yokohama, Japan
- Education: Meiji University
- Occupation: Actress
- Years active: 1992–present
- Agent: UN et NEUF

Mao Inoue (井上 真央; born 9 January 1987) is a Japanese actress known for her roles as Akane Imai in the Kids War series, Tsukushi Makino in the Boys Over Flowers series, and as Sugi Fumi (ja) in the 54th taiga drama Burning Flower. She has also appeared in several films, including I Give My First Love to You, Rebirth, and The Snow White Murder Case.

== Early life and education ==
Inoue was born on 9 January 1987 in Yokohama, Kanagawa Prefecture. At the age of four, her mother encouraged her to participate in acting, art, and music. Although acting was not her initial priority, she decided to continue upon receiving her first fan letter.

In 2004, Inoue decided to suspend her acting career to prepare for her university entrance exams. At age 18, she enrolled in Meiji University, majoring in theatre and literature, with Chinese as her elective. She graduated in March 2009.

== Career ==
=== Dramas and films ===
Inoue began her acting career at the age of five, appearing in the television series Kids War from 1999 to 2003. In 2005, she was awarded the Best Actress Award from the Television Drama Academy for her portrayal of Tsukushi Makino in Boys Over Flowers.

Inoue made her film debut in 2006 with Check It Out, Yo!

Inoue took on further television roles, such as the television drama First Kiss, co-starring Yūta Hiraoka. She played a maiko-turned-geisha in the drama special Hanaikusa. She starred in Anmitsu Hime (2008) and Anmitsu Hime 2 (2009), where she portrayed a princess and also contributed to the 2009 theme song alongside Shoko Nakagawa.

Following Boys Over Flowers and its 2007 sequel, Inoue starred in the film adaptation, Boys Over Flowers: Final (2008). The film was the highest-grossing live action film released in Japan that year.

After university, Inoue returned to acting in Boku no Hatsukoi wo Kimi ni Sasagu (2009), in which she shared the lead with Masaki Okada. In April of the following year, My Darling is a Foreigner was released in theaters with Inoue starring alongside Jonathan Sherr.

She reunited with Boys Over Flowers co-star Shun Oguri for the drama Jūi Dolittle (獣医ドリトル, Veterinarian Dolittle), which began airing in October 2010. She also starred in the 84th Asadora drama Ohisama (おひさま, The Sun), portraying a young woman who lived through World War II in Nagano prefecture. She won "Best Actress" for her role in the 70th Television Drama Academy Awards.

In February 2011, Inoue co-starred with Yutaka Takenouch in Oba: The Last Samurai, a film about World War II holdout Captain Sakae Ōba. Inoue starred in the film Rebirth, which was released in April 2011. Both films were successful at the box office. In Rebirth, her portrayal of a daughter with a difficult past earned her the "Best Starring Actress" award in the 35th Japan Film Academy Awards.

Inoue was chosen to chair the red team in the New Year's Eve Singing Contest Kōhaku Uta Gassen in 2011. This team became the first female-led red team to win the Kōhaku Uta Gassen in seven years.

Due to her performance in Oba: Miracle in the Pacific, she was chosen to star as Chiaki Nishikawa in the comedy film Tug of War!, which was released in November 2012.

She appeared alongside V6's members, Junichi Okada and Haruma Miura, in the war film The Eternal Zero in 2013. The film topped the Japan Box Office for eight consecutive weeks and broke box office records. The film also won the Audience Award at the Far East Film Festival.

Inoue reunited with some of her co-stars and the director of Tug of War!, Nobuo Mizuta, in the comedy film King of Apology, which was released in September 2013.

In March 2014, Inoue appeared in a leading role in the mystery thriller film The Snow White Murder Case, directed by Yoshihiro Nakamura.

In June 2014, it was announced that Inoue would play the lead role of Sugi Fumi in the 2015 NHK taiga drama Burning Flower. After the series experienced historically low ratings during its run, Inoue publicly took responsibility for the viewership, stating, "I am the starring actress, so it has to be from my lack of ability."

Following this, Inoue took a year and a half hiatus from acting and later returned to television in the Fuji TV drama School Counselor, which aired in the fall.

In 2019, Inoue starred in the comedic period film Talking the Pictures and in the special 5-episode NHK drama Boy Torajiro. The following year, on January 8, 2020, her film Angry Rice Wives, set during the 1918 Rice Riots, was released in cinemas across Japan.

In May 2020, it was confirmed that Inoue would appear in the NTV drama Pay To Ace, alongside Yuya Yagira and Shigeaki Kato. The series was originally scheduled to air in July 2020 but was postponed due to the COVID-19 pandemic.

Mao Inoue recently returned to major film work with the release of Sunset Sunrise (2025), in which she played the role of Momoka Sekino. The film, directed by Yoshiyuki Kishi with a screenplay by Kankurō Kudō and adapted from a novel by Nire Shūhei, has been described as a socially reflective drama exploring contemporary community life. Despite renewed visibility brought by the film, Inoue has remained relatively low-profile in the broader media landscape, with reports noting fewer public and television appearances in recent years. A 2023 profile described her as thoughtful and selective in choosing roles, emphasizing a reflective and intentional period in her career development.

=== Voice acting ===
In 2014, Inoue debuted as a voice actress, providing the voice of Apple Boy in the film Anpanman: Apple Boy and Everyone's Hope. The anime film was released in July 2014.

Her next voice project was the 3DCG animated film Rudolf the Black Cat. It was announced on July 31, 2015. The film was released on August 6, 2016.

=== Stage ===
Inoue was cast in the 2013 stage play MIWA, and later starred in the 2016 play Anger, which ran from January to April of that year.

== Filmography ==
=== Television dramas ===
| Year | Title | Role | Notes | Ref. |
|---|---|---|---|---|
| 1992 | Gakkō ga Abunai! | Mami Asakura | | |
| 1992 | Itsumitemo Haran Banjō | Midori Satsuki | | |
| 1992 | Tsubusareta Kao! Zankoku na Shashin | | | |
| 1993 | Kokoro no Tabi Series | | | |
| 1994 | Kagishi | | | |
| 1994 | Mayonaka no Jōkyaku | | | |
| 1994 | Ninja Sentai Kakuranger | Tsuruhime/Ninja White as a young child | | |
| 1995 | Tōryanse | | | |
| 1995 | Kura | | | |
| 1996 | Genki o Ageru | Maiko Nitani | | |
| 1996 | Asahi ni Wakare no Seppun o | | | |
| 1997 | Abarenbō Shōgun VII | Sayo | Episode 17 | |
| 1997 | Mito Kōmon 25th Series | | Episode 14 | |
| 1997 | Terakoya Yume Shinan | | | |
| 1997 | Kin no Tamago | | Episode 3 | |
| 1997 | Shin Hanshichi Torimonochō | | | |
| 1997 | Gourmet Mystery Onna Shutchō Ryōrinin ga Iku! | | | |
| 1998 | Tōyama no Kinsan vs Onna Nezumi | Tonbo | Episode 8 | |
| 1998 | Hi no Ryōsen | | | |
| 1999 | Kai | Ayako Tomita | | |
| 1999–2003 | Kids War | Akane Imai | Lead role; 5 seasons | |
| 2000 | Otōsan | Yū Ōmura | | |
| 2003 | Kids War: The Final | Akane Imai | Lead role; television film | |
| 2004 | Home Drama | Shōko Nagamine | | |
| 2005 | Emergency Room 24 Hours | Sae Kokubo | Season 3; episodes 1 to 4 | |
| 2005 | Boys Over Flowers | Makino Tsukushi | Lead role | |
| 2005 | Grave of the Fireflies | Natsu Sawano | TV movie | |
| 2007 | Boys Over Flowers 2 | Makino Tsukushi | Lead role | |
| 2007 | Ōsama no Shinzō | Sakura Kariya | | |
| 2007 | First Kiss | Mio Fukunaga | Lead role | |
| 2007 | Hanaikusa | Mineko Iwasaki | Lead role | |
| 2008 | Anmitsu Hime | Anmitsu Hime/Tokoroten | Lead role | |
| 2009 | Anmitsu Hime 2 | Anmitsu Hime/Tokoroten | Lead role | |
| 2009 | Karei naru Spy | Ami Yoshizawa | Episode 1 | |
| 2009 | Emergency Room 24 Hours | Sae Kokubo | Season 4; episode 4 | |
| 2009 | Tengoku de Kimi ni Aetara | Natsuko Nonogami | Television film | |
| 2009 | Yonimo Kimyō na Monogatari: Aki no Tokubetsuhen | Kanako Okazaki | Lead role | |
| 2010 | Mominoki wa Nokotta | Uno | | |
| 2010 | Veterinarian Dolittle | Asuka Tashima | | |
| 2011 | Sunshine | Yōko Sudō | Lead role; Asadora | |
| 2012 | Gooko's Life | Suzumiya Miki | Lead role | |
| 2013 | Paji | Momo | Special appearance | |
| 2015 | Burning Flower | Sugi Fumi | Lead role; Taiga drama | |
| 2017 | School Counselor | Hinata Aizawa | Lead role | |
| 2019 | Shōnen Torajirō | Mitsuko Kuruma | Lead role; miniseries | |
| 2021 | Pay to Ace | Mai Sakura | | |
| 2023 | Why Didn't I Tell You a Million Times? | Yui Sōma | Lead role | |
| 2026 | Silent Truth | Makiko Iwamoto | | |

=== Films ===
| Year | Title | Role | Notes | Ref. |
|---|---|---|---|---|
| 2006 | Check It Out, Yo! | Yui Haebaru | | |
| 2007 | Ge Ge Ge no Kitaro | Mika Miura | | |
| 2007 | Kaidan | | | |
| 2008 | Hana Yori Dango Final | Makino Tsukushi | Lead role | |
| 2009 | I Give My First Love to You | Mayu Taneda | Lead role | |
| 2010 | My Darling Is a Foreigner | Saori | Lead role | |
| 2010 | Surely Someday | Shōko Gotō | | |
| 2011 | Oba: The Last Samurai | Chieko Aono | | |
| 2011 | Rebirth | Erina | Lead role | |
| 2012 | Tug of War! | Nishikawa Chiaki | Lead role | |
| 2013 | The Eternal Zero | Miyabe Matsuno | | |
| 2013 | King of Apology | Noriko Kuramochi | | |
| 2014 | The Snow White Murder Case | Miki Shirono | Lead role | |
| 2014 | Anpanman: Apple Boy and Everyone's Hope | Apple Boy (voice) | | |
| 2016 | Rudolf the Black Cat | Rudolf (voice) | Lead role | |
| 2018 | Yakiniku Dragon | Rika | | |
| 2018 | When a Tree Falls | Mitsue Kayama | Lead role | |
| 2019 | Talking the Pictures | Kotoe Tachibana | | |
| 2020 | I Never Shot Anyone | Karuta Fukuhara | | |
| 2021 | Angry Rice Wives | Ito Matsuura | Lead role | |
| 2022 | Remember to Breathe | Yūko | Lead role | |
| 2025 | Sunset Sunrise | Momoka Sekino | | |

=== Other television ===
- 2011: 62nd NHK Kōhaku Uta Gassen - MC

== Awards and nominations ==
| Year | Organization | Award | Work(s) | Result | Ref. |
|---|---|---|---|---|---|
| 2007 | 10th Nikkan Sports Drama Grand Prix | Best Actress | Boys Over Flowers 2 | Won | |
| 2007 | 16th Hashida Awards | Best Newcomer | Boys Over Flowers 2 | Won | |
| 2007 | MTV Student Voice Awards | Best Actress | Boys Over Flowers 2 | Won | |
| 2008 | Nickelodeon Kids' Choice Awards | Best Actress | Boys Over Flowers 2 | Won | |
| 2011 | 3rd Tama Film Awards | Best Emerging Actress | Miracle in the Pacific | Won | |
| 2011 | 35th Fumiko Yamaji Award Film Awards | Newcomer Actress | Rebirth | Won | |
| 2011 | 26th Nikkan Sports Film Award | Best Newcomer | Rebirth, Miracle in the Pacific | Won | |
| 2012 | 36th Elan d'or Awards | Newcomer of the Year | Herself | Won | |
| 2012 | 35th Japan Academy Film Prize | Best Actress | Rebirth | Won | |
| 2015 | 38th Japan Academy Film Prize | Best Actress | The Snow White Murder Case | Nominated | |
| 2019 | 61st Blue Ribbon Awards | Best Supporting Actress | Yakiniku Dragon | Nominated | |
