= Boys Over Flowers (Japanese TV series) =

Japanese television drama series

- Japanese: 花より男子(だんご)
Transcriptions
- Romanization: Hana yori Dango
- Genre: Romance; Teen drama
- Based on: Boys Over Flowers by Yoko Kamio
- Written by: Mikio Satake (also series composition); Shūko Arai (series composition cooperation); Yuki Fujimoto; Natsuko Takahashi
- Directed by: Yasuharu Ishii; Daisuke Yamamuro; Osamu Katayama
- Starring: Mao Inoue; Jun Matsumoto; Shun Oguri; Shota Matsuda; Tsuyoshi Abe
- Theme music composer: Hiroo Ooyagi
- Opening theme: "Wish" by Arashi
- Composer: Kosuke Yamashita
- Country of origin: Japan
- Original language: Japanese
- No. of episodes: 9

Production
- Producer: Katsuaki Setoguchi
- Production location: Japan
- Running time: Fridays at 22:00
- Production company: TBS

Original release
- Network: JNN (TBS)
- Release: 21 October – 16 December 2005

Related
- Meteor Garden (2001, Taiwan); Boys Over Flowers (2009, South Korea); Boys Over Flowers Season 2 (2018, Japan); F4 Thailand: Boys Over Flowers (2021, Thailand)

Boys Over Flowers (花より男子(だんご), Hana yori Dango) is a 2005 Japanese television drama series starring Mao Inoue, Jun Matsumoto of Arashi, Shun Oguri, Shota Matsuda, and Tsuyoshi Abe. It is based on the manga series Boys Over Flowers by Yoko Kamio.

A sequel entitled Boys Over Flowers 2 aired in 2007, and a sequel film, Hana yori Dango Final: The Movie, was released in 2008.

== Plot synopsis ==
Tsukushi Makino is a tough, hard-working, lower-middle-class student at the prestigious escalator school Eitoku Gakuen. Initially, Makino wanted to attend Eitoku because her idol, an internationally renowned model named Shizuka Todou, was an alumna of the school. Not long after however, Makino discovers the superficial nature of her classmates. Their arrogance and her inability to relate to them because of her social status limit her chances to make friends. Worse yet, the school is ruled by the F4 or Flower Four, composed of playboys Soujiro Nishikado and Akira Mimasaka, introverted but intelligent and handsome Hanazawa Rui and violent and bratty Domyouji Tsukasa. The F4, sons of Japan's wealthiest and most powerful tycoons, bully fellow students out of boredom or malevolence until they are expelled or quit.

Makino's only wish is to remain invisible in Eitoku to avoid getting into trouble. However, she is immersed into the lives of the four legendary bullies after her first and only friend at school, Sakurako Sanjo, accidentally spills juice on Domyouji's white shirt in the cafeteria and she defends her. The next day, she receives a red tag in her locker (an order from the F4 to bully the target student by whatever means possible) and as a result, the whole school turns against her. Despite the harassment, Tsukushi, the "tough weed", refuses to give in or quit. After Domyouji treads all over the lobster her parents painstakingly cooked for her, she finally snaps, knocks him out and declares war on him. This unexpected retaliation catches him by surprise and causes him to fall in love with her. But Tsukushi has fallen in love with Rui, who in turn harbors romantic feelings for his childhood friend Shizuka.

The courtship between Tsukasa and Tsukushi is the main theme throughout the series. Various challenges threaten their blossoming relationship, including Tsukushi's wavering feelings for Rui, the envy of fellow Eitoku students, an obsessed childhood classmate, their differences in social class, Tsukasa's brash and possessive nature, and the animosity of Kaede Domyouji, Tsukasa's mother. The first season ends with Domyouji giving the saturn necklace to Makino and her confession of love right before he leaves for New York.

== Episode overview ==
| No. | Title |
|---|---|
| 1 | "Declaration of war! The thing which is absolutely more important than money" |
Makino receives a red notice from F4. Her life is made a misery until she stands up to Domyoji and punches him.
| 2 | "The worst first kiss!" |
Makino attends a high society function to welcome home Rui's childhood love.
| 3 | "Tears! Good-bye to the person I like" |
Rui leaves for France to follow his childhood love.
| 4 | "First time coming home in the morning" |
Makino and Domyoji get stuck in an elevator overnight.
| 5 | "Confession of life-threatening love" |
Rui returns from France back to Japan.
| 6 | "A love triangle of a roller-coaster ride hair-trigger crisis" |
Makino and Domyoji go on a double date.
| 7 | "Battle F4 dissolution!" |
The F4 gets into a fight as Rui and Domyoji argue over Makino.
| 8 | "Now the female high school student's "Top of Japan" decision war" |
Makino enters the Teen of Japan competition to earn enough money to pay off her dad's debt.
| 9 | "The greatest last present" |
Makino comes second in the Teen of Japan tournament. Domyoji leaves to study Business Management in New York while the rest of the F4 spend Christmas in various ways.

== Cast ==
Info

=== Main cast ===
- Mao Inoue as Tsukushi Makino
- Jun Matsumoto as Tsukasa Domyouji
- Shun Oguri as Rui Hanazawa
- Shota Matsuda as Soujiro Nishikado
- Tsuyoshi Abe as Akira Mimasaka

=== Supporting cast ===
- Aki Nishihara as Yuki Matsuoka
- Mayumi Sada as Todo Shizuka
- Seto Saki as Yuriko Asai
- Fukada Aki as Erika Ayuhara
- Matsuoka Emiko as Minako Yamano
- David Ito as Nishida
- Megumi Sato as Sakurako Sanjo
- Nanako Matsushima as Tsubaki Domyoji
- Mariko Kaga as Kaede Domyoji
- Takako Katou as Sachiyo Sengoku (Okami-San)
- Susumu Kobayashi as Haruo Makino
- Mako Ishino as Chieko Makino
- Satoshi Tomiura as Susumu Makino

=== Guests ===
- Kazue Itō as Minako Yamanaka
- Masei Nakayama as Junji Terada (Class 2C)
- Kaori Ikeda as Mizuki Morioka
- Tomohiro Kaku as Shingo Sawatari (Episode 1)
- Kazuma Sano as Takayuki Kimoto (Episode 1)
- Tomoharu Hasegawa (Episode 1)
- Shunji Igarashi (Episode 1)
- Kento Handa as Ryuji (Episode 4-5)
- Tatsuya Gashuin (Episode 4-5)
- Takayuki Takuma (Episode 4-9)
- Shugo Oshinari as Nakatsuka (Episode 6-7)
- Yoko Mitsuya as Nakatsuka's Other Girl (Episode 6-7)
- Ayana Sakai as Ayano Kurimaki (Episode 8-9)
- Kazuaki Hankai as TOJ's Emcee (Episode 8-9)
- Momoko Shibuya as a TOJ Participant (Episode 8-9)
- Sotaro Suzuki (Episode 9)

== Production credits ==
- Based on the Boys Over Flowers Comics by: Yoko Kamio
- Screenwriters: Mikio Satake, Yuki Fujimoto, Natsuko Takahashi, Shūko Arai
- Producer: Katsuaki Setoguchi
- Directors: Yasuharu Ishii, Daisuke Yamamuro, Osamu Katayama
- Music: Kosuke Yamashita

== Reception ==
=== Ratings ===
| Episode | Subtitle | Ratings (Kanto) | Ratings (Kansai) | Ratings (Nationwide) |
|---|---|---|---|---|
| 1 | Declaration of war! The thing which is absolutely more important than money | 18.3 | 14.5 | N/A |
| 2 | The worst first kiss! | 19.3 | 19.6 | N/A |
| 3 | Tears! Good-bye to the person I like | 20.5 | 19.7 | N/A |
| 4 | First time coming home in the morning | 20.7 | 21.1 | N/A |
| 5 | Confession of life-threatening love | 19.0 | 19.7 | N/A |
| 6 | A love triangle of a roller-coaster ride hair-trigger crisis | 19.7 | 20.0 | N/A |
| 7 | Battle F4 dissolution! | 17.3 | 15.5 | N/A |
| 8 | Now the female high school student's "Top of Japan" decision war | 19.9 | 21.3 | N/A |
| 9 | The greatest last present | 22.4 | 22.5 | N/A |
| Average | | 19.68 | 19.32 | N/A |

Source: Video Research, Ltd.

=== Awards ===
| Year | Ceremony | Category/Recipient |
|---|---|---|
| 2005 | 47th Television Drama Academy Awards | Best Actress (Mao Inoue) |
| 2005 | 47th Television Drama Academy Awards | Best Supporting Actor (Jun Matsumoto) |

== International broadcast ==
In the Philippines, the series aired on GMA-7 from April 23 to May 25, 2007.

In Vietnam, the series aired on VTV3 every 10:30pm every Monday to Friday, start on 17 October 2013 (with all 2 seasons).
