= Tsuyoshi Abe =

Japanese actor

- 阿部力
- Born: February 13, 1982 (age 44); Heilongjiang, China
- Other names: Lǐ Zhèndōng (李振冬)
- Occupation: Actor
- Years active: 2000–present
- Spouse: Shi Ke (m. 2009)

Tsuyoshi Abe (阿部 力, Abe Tsuyoshi; born February 13, 1982, in Heilongjiang, China) is a Japanese actor.

== Biography ==
Abe is of mixed Chinese and Japanese descent (his grandmother was Japanese), he is able to speak both Mandarin and Japanese fluently.

Abe's original name was Li Zhendong (李振冬); after he moved to Japan at age 9, he changed to using his present name. He spent a year at the Beijing Film Academy at age 18.

== Personal life ==
On April 29, 2009 Abe told reporters that he and Chinese actress Shi Ke (史可) have tied the knot. They reportedly started dating after the shooting in 2006 of the Chinese film Stand In Love. Abe also revealed that they "had to make do with virtual dates" on their computers to be make things work.

In August 2017, Japanese publications Josei Seven and NEWS Post Seven alleged that in 2014, Abe had been engaged in an affair with Takako Uehara, herself married to Tenn (MC) at the time. Supporting documents shared with the publications by Tenn's family include his suicide note referencing the affair, and photographs from Tenn's phone of chat transcripts between Uehara and Abe.

== Filmography ==
=== Television ===
- Michael the Archangel's Dance as Hero (TTV, 2004)
- The Proof of Memories (记忆的证明) as Xiao Yi (CCTV, 2004)
- Boys Over Flowers as Akira Mimasaka (TBS, 2005)
- Yakusha Damashii as Reiji Mitsurugi (Fuji TV, 2006)
- Mop Girl as Yukiya Shindo (TV Asahi, 2007, ep10)
- Kikujiro to Saki 3 as Shigekazu Kitano (TV Asahi, 2007)
- Shinuka to Omotta (NTV, 2007, ep6)
- Boys Over Flowers: Returns as Akira Mimasaka (TBS, 2007)
- Koizora as Yuu Fukuhara (TBS, 2008, ep.4 & 5)
- Absolute Boyfriend as Nightly Series Type 02 Toshiki (Fuji TV, 2008, ep8)
- Qi Lin Guan Zhi Lian (2008)
- Wish to See You Again (CTS, 2008, ep05)
- Mirai Koshi Meguru as Daisaku Kaneda (TV Asahi, 2008, ep2)
- Alice in Borderland as Keiichi Kuzuryū (Netflix, 2020–22)

=== Films ===
- Public Toilet as Dong Dong (2000)
- Initial D as Kenji (2005)
- Until the Lights Come Back as Toutou Sumono (2005)
- Inugoe as Ryo Narita (2006)
- Christmas on July 24th Avenue as Yoshio Moriyama (2006)
- Rough as Hiroki Nakanishi (2006)
- Catch – Guo Shi Wu Shuang as Prince (2006)
- Big Stan (2007)
- Stand In Love (2007)
- Boys Over Flowers: Final as Akira Mimasaka (2008)
- The Incite Mill as Yudai Osako (2010)
- Mozu (2015)
- Assassination Classroom: Graduation as Red Eye (2016)
- Sora as Hayato Mochizuki (2021)
- Across the Furious Sea as Dao Jin (2023)
- The Rightman (2025)

== Endorsements ==
- Toyota (2004)
- Yamaha Vino (2004)
- So Nice Clothing (2002)
- HSBC Bank (2002)
