= Shun Oguri =

Japanese actor (born 1982)

- 小栗 旬
- Oguri in 2026
- Born: December 26, 1982 (age 43); Kodaira, Tokyo, Japan
- Occupation: Actor
- Years active: 1995–present
- Agent: Tristone Entertainment
- Spouse: Yu Yamada (m. 2012)
- Children: 4
- Relatives: Shintaro Yamada (brother-in-law)
- Website: Shun Oguri Official Web Site

Shun Oguri (小栗 旬, Oguri Shun; born December 26, 1982) is a Japanese actor, son of stage director Tetsuya Oguri, and the youngest of 3 siblings, including older brother Ryo, who is also an actor.

He started in small roles as extra in the works in which his father and brother worked. He began his official acting career at the age of 13 in the TV drama Hachidai Shogun Yoshimune (1995). With over 100 credits to his name, Oguri's extensive filmography includes Lupin the 3rd, Crows Zero and Gintama. He directed his first film in 2010, Surely Someday, a drama in which he had a cameo role. Oguri made his Hollywood debut in Godzilla vs. Kong in 2021. As a voice actor, in 2005, he lent his voice in Fullmetal Alchemist the Movie: Conqueror of Shamballa as Alfons Heiderich, as well as other characters in other series.

In 2023 he became president of Tristone Entertainment, the agency to which he belongs.

== Career ==
=== Acting ===
Oguri made his television debut in NHK's drama Hachidai Shogun Yoshimune. He continued appearing in other taiga drama, including Segodon and The 13 Lords of the Shogun.

After playing the bullied and abused child Noboru Yoshikawa in the drama Great Teacher Onizuka, his acting in that drama attracted attention, and led to bigger roles. In 2000, he played a deaf person in Summer Snow. In 2002, he starred in the popular drama Gokusen, in which he played a part of a bully, rather than the bullied, as he did in Great Teacher Onizuka. Oguri rose to prominence after his breakthrough role in 2005, as 'Rui Hanazawa' in the popular drama Boys Over Flowers. In 2007, he starred in the drama Hanazakari no Kimitachi e as 'Izumi Sano', co-starring with Toma Ikuta and Maki Horikita. In 2008, Oguri took up another lead drama role in Binbō Danshi by playing an optimistic poor college student named 'Kazumi Koyama'. In 2009, he appeared as lead in the drama Tokyo Dogs as American detective 'So Takakura'. He reunited with Boys Over Flowers co-star Mao Inoue for the drama Jūi Dolittle (獣医ドリトル, Veterinarian Dolittle), which began airing in October 2010. In 2012, he costarred with Satomi Ishihara in Fuji TV's Rich man, poor woman as a young wealthy man 'Toru Hyuga', which earned him the first Best Actor award in 74th Drama Academy Award. 1n 2014, Oguri starred in semi-historic anime live action drama Nobunaga Concerto, as both high school student 'Saburo' and the warlord 'Nobunaga Oda'. He continued to appear in other history-based dramas. In 2015, he reunited with Toma Ikuta after seven years in the TBS drama Ouroboros as 'Tatsuya Danno'.

Oguri appeared in 2006 as 'Shinichi Kudo' in the first Detective Conan live action movie Detective Conan: Shinichi Kudo's Written Challenge. In 2014, he was in the anime live action movie Lupin the third as the main character. And in 2017, he gave life to character Gintoki Sakata in the 1st. movie of the live action adaptation of anime Gintama, a role he reprised in 2 mini-series and another movie.

In November 2018, Oguri was cast in Godzilla vs. Kong, his Hollywood debut. The movie was released in theaters and on HBO Max in March 2021. He also appeared in films such as Sukiyaki Western Django, Let Me Eat Your Pancreas and Tsumi no Koe directed by Nobuhiro Doi (best known for directed Strawberry on the Shortcake, Be with You and Flying Colors)

He appeared in his first South-Korean and Japanese co-production, the Netflix original television series Romantics Anonymous alongside Han Hyo-joo. This remake of the French romantic comedy film Les Émotifs Anonymes premiered at the 30th Busan International Film Festival and was released on Netflix in October 2025.

In 2005, Oguri lent his voice as a voice actor in Fullmetal Alchemist the Movie: Conqueror of Shamballa, together with his brother Ryo. In 2009, he lent his voice as a voice actor once again in Wangan Midnight as 'Akio Asakura'.

=== Directing ===
He is also a director. His directorial debut was directing a commercial in 2009, but his major directorial debut on the big screen was a movie titled Surely Someday, which was released on July 17, 2010 nationwide in Japan. Oguri cast several of his good friends within the entertainment industry in the movie, such as Keisuke Koide as the lead starring role, Actresses Mao Inoue and Aya Ueto as cameos, and himself also making a cameo appearance in the movie.

=== Musicals and other songs ===
In 2011, after the Tohoku earthquake and tsunami, he was part of a group of 71 actors and singers that appeared in the Suntory beverage company's commercials, singing the songs Miagete goran yoru no hoshi wo and Ue wo muite arukō. His singing voice has also been included in several stage appearances.

=== Radio navigator ===
On 2007, Oguri began appearing as navigator in Nippon Broadcasting System's radio program "All Night Nippon", which he carried (as "Oguri Shun no All Night Nippon") until 2010, with occasional special appearances after that. He was suggested to act as part of All Night Nippon for the PV of the song "Karensou" by newcomer group KEY GOT CREW.

== Tristone Entertainment presidency ==
Oguri was appointed president of the talent agency to which he belongs, Tristone Entertainment, in 2023. In October 2024 it was announced that Oguri and other Tristone artists would participate in the first fan appreciation event "Tristone Fan Fes 2025 ~Undokai~", taking place on March 15, 2025. About the event, Oguri said, "In recent years, we have been holding fan meetings and creating opportunities to meet fans in person, but this time we thought it would be a good idea to hold a fan appreciation celebration together. The event is held with the aim of allowing fans to experience the talents and charms of others, not only their own favorites, but also to share with them and have a great time together."

== Personal life ==
In 2004, Oguri was in a relationship with then-Morning Musume member Mari Yaguchi. In 2017, Yaguchi admitted that after their relationship was publicized on weekly tabloids, she decided to leave the group in 2005 to continue dating him. They later ended their relationship in 2006.

Oguri married actress and model Yu Yamada on March 14, 2012. They have four children, born in 2014, 2017, 2020 and 2022. According to reports made by an undisclosed acquaintance, the third child was born in April in Los Angeles, in the United States.

== Filmography ==
=== TV drama ===
Year	Title	Role	Notes	Ref.
1995	Hachidai Shogun Yoshimune	Tokugawa Munemoto	Taiga drama (ep. 44)	
1995	Thursday Ghost Stories: Kaiki Club (Elementary and High School Editions	classmate	Extra (Note: noticeable in ep. 7 and 16 'Elementary School Student edition'; several appearances in "Jr. High School student ed.")	
1996	Hideyoshi	Sakichi	Taiga drama	
1996	Shōri no Megami	Cram school student		
1997	Sore ga Kotae da!	Tōru	Episodes 10 and 11	
1997	Kaze hikaru ken ~ hachigokuto hiken			
1998	Great Teacher Onizuka (1998)	Noboru Yoshikawa	Series	
1998	Ten made todoke Part 7	Junior High School student	Episode 9	
1999	Great Teacher Onizuka (1999 special)	Noboru Yoshikawa	Special episode	
1999	Kasai Chōsakan Akiko (家裁調査官 晶子)	Shinji Shibasaki		
2000	Aoi	Hosokawa Tadatoshi	Taiga drama	
2000	Ikebukuro West Gate Park	Yoshikazu	Episode 2 guest appearance	
2000	Summer Snow	Jun Shinoda		
2000	Asu o Dakishimete	Kazuhiko Kido		
2000	Henshū Ō	Takeshi	Episodes 10 and 11	
2001	Disqualified Mother (2001) (母業失格 (2001), Hahaoya Shikakku (2001))	Hiromasa Inoue	Television film	
2001	Pure Soul ~ Kimi ga Boku wo Wasurete mo ~	Manabu Takahara		
2001	shin-D Cherry	Hiroshi Yamazaki		
2001	Hāto Heart / Hurt	Kaito Komine		
2001	Ao to Shiro de Mizuiro	Takumi Kishida	Television special	
2002	Gokusen	Haruhiko Uchiyama (Uchi)		
2003	Tengoku no Daisuke e	Daisuke Sato	Television special	
2003	Okaasan to Issho (2003)	Kensuke Aramaki		
2003	Gokusen Special: Goodbye Class 3-D	Haruhiko Uchiyama (Uchi)	Television special	
2003	Stand Up!!	Kōji Enami		
2004	Fire Boys:Megumi no Daigo	Ken Yazawa	Episode 2 guest appearance, episode 10 voice	
2004	Hungry Kid (ハングリー・キッド)	Hayao Morikawa	Four-episode drama	
2005	Taika no Kaishin	Ōenomiko Nakano	Two-episode drama	
2005	Emergency Room 24 Hours	Kazuya Kono	Third series	
2005	Charming	Junichi Yaguchi		
2005	Yoshitsune	Kajiwara Kagesue	Taiga drama	
2005	Koto	Shinichi Mizuki	Television special	
2005	Hontō ni Atta Kowai Hanashi	Yoshinori Nishigaki	Weekly television special	
2005	Train Man	Munetaka Minamoto		
2005	Twenty-Four Eyes	Isokichi Okada	Television film	
2005	Boys Over Flowers	Rui Hanazawa		
2006	El Poporazzi ga Yuku!!	Kōta		
2006	Yūki	Hama	Television special	
2006	Densha Otoko Deluxe	Munetaka Minamoto		
2006	Detective Conan: Shinichi Kudo's Written Challenge	Shinichi Kudo	Television special, leading role	
2007	Boys Over Flowers 2	Rui Hanazawa		
2007	Hana-Kimi	Izumi Sano	Leading role	
2007	Shinichi Kudo Returns! Showdown with the Black Organization	Shinichi Kudo	Leading role, television special	
2008	Binbō Danshi	Kazumi Koyama	Leading role	
2008	Yume o Kanaeru Zo	Kohei Nogami		
2008	Hanazakari no Kimitachi e Special	Izumi Sano	Television special	
2009	Tenchijin	Ishida Mitsunari	Taiga drama	
2009	Smile	Seiji Hayashi		
2009	Tokyo Dogs	So Takakura	Leading role	
2010	Wagaya no Rekishi	Ken Takakura		
2010	Sayonara, Aruma: Akagami wo Moratta Inu	Seitaro Sanada	Television film	
2010	Jūi Dolittle	Kenichi Tottori	Leading role	
2010	Kikoku	Sublieutenant Kitani	Television film	
2011	Arakawa Under the Bridge	Village leader Sonchou	Leading role	
2011	The Brave Yoshihiko and Great Satan's Castle	Bacchus	Guest appearance (ep. 10)	
2012	Rich Man, Poor Woman	Toru Hyuga	Leading role	
2013	Yae's Sakura	Yoshida Shoin	Taiga drama	
2013	Woman	Aoyagi Shin		
2013	Tales of the Unusual: Spring 2013 – Segment 1: Air Doctor	Kirihara Toru	Leading role	
2014	Oiesan	Naokichi Kaneko	Television film	
2014	Border	Ango Ishikawa	Leading role	
2014	Nobunaga Concerto	Saburo, Nobunaga Oda and Akechi Mitsuhide	Leading roles	
2014	Father's Back	Torao Kitabeppu (adult)	Episode 10	
2015	Ouroboros	Tatsuya Danno	Leading role	
2015	Dr. Storks	Hiroyuki Nagai		
2016	Daishô	Keisuke Okuyama	Leading role	
2017	Crisis	Akira Inami	Leading role	
2017	Gintama: Mitsuba Arc	Gintoki Sakata	Leading role; miniseries	
2017	Border 2 : Shokuzai	Ango Ishikawa	Leading role; television film	
2018	Boys Over Flowers Season 2	Rui Hanazawa	Cameo / Guest role	
2018	Segodon	Sakamoto Ryōma	Taiga drama (ep. 26, 28, 31-35)	
2018	Gintama 2 - Gintama of the Unusual	Gintoki Sakata	Leading role	
2018	From Today, It's My Turn!!	The barber at Genji's Hair Salon	Cameo (Ep. 1)	
2018	Endō Kenichi to Kudō Kankurō no Benkyō sa sete itadakimasu		Guest appearance (Ep. 1)	
2019	Two Homelands	Kenji Amō	Leading role; television film	
2019	Secret × Heroine Phantomirage!	Phanguri / Jun Oguri	Guest appearance (ep. 25, 26, 27)	
2021	Japan Sinks: People of Hope	Keishi Amami	Leading role	
2022	The 13 Lords of the Shogun	Hōjō Yoshitoki	Leading role, Taiga drama	
2023	The Mystery Day	Kyōsuke Natsume	Television film	
2023	What Will You Do, Ieyasu?	Tenkai	Cameo, Taiga drama	
2024	GTO Revival	Noboru Yoshikawa	Television film	
2025	Romantics Anonymous	Sosuke Fujiwara	Leading role	
2025	Pray Speak What Has Happened	Yukio Ninagawa	Cameo (Ep. 9)	
2026	Brothers in Arms	Oda Nobunaga	Taiga drama	
2026	Human Vapor	Kenji Okamoto	Leading role	
2026	Lost 10	Nao		
2026	GTO 2026	Noboru Yoshikawa	Cameo (episode 11)	

=== Film ===
Year	Title	Role	Notes	Ref.
2000	Happy Family Plan	Hirose		
2002	Lament of the Lamb	Kazuna Takashiro	Leading role	
2003	Azumi	Nachi		
2003	Robot Contest	Koichi Aida		
2003	Spring Story	Kei	Leading role	
2004	Haken Kuroitsu no Tsubasa	Rikuo		
2004	Is. A	Yuya Kaitsu		
2005	The Neighbor No. Thirteen	Murasaki Juzo		
2005	Azumi 2: Death or Love	Ginkaku		
2005	Life on the Long Board	Kenta		
2005	Reincarnation	Kazuya Onishi		
2006	Gigolo Wannabe	Ryohei	Leading role	
2006	Ghost Train	Shunichi		
2007	Sakuran	Florist	Cameo appearance	
2007	Kisaragi	Iemoto	Leading role	
2007	Sukiyaki Western Django	Akira		
2007	Crows Zero	Genji Takiya	Leading role	
2008	Boys Over Flowers Final	Rui Hanazawa		
2008	Snakes and Earrings	Yoshida	Cameo appearance	
2009	Crows Zero 2	Genji Takiya	Leading role	
2009	Gokusen: The Movie	Haruhiko Uchiyama (Uchi)		
2009	Tajomaru	Hatakeyama Naomitsu/Tajomaru	Leading role	
2010	Surely Someday	Policeman B	Cameo appearance/director	
2010	Bayside Shakedown 3: Set the Guys Loose	Seiichi Torikai		
2011	Peak: The Rescuers	Sanpo Shimazaki	Leading role	
2011	The Woodsman and the Rain	Koichi Tanabe		
2012	Space Brothers	Nanba Mutta	Leading role	
2012	Arakawa Under the Bridge	Village leader Sonchou		
2013	Dokurojo no Shinichijin aka Seven Souls in Skull Castle	Sutenosuke	Leading role	
2013	A Boy Called H	Noodle shop worker		
2014	Lupin the 3rd	Arsène Lupin III	Leading role	
2015	Galaxy Turnpike	Hatoya		
2016	Nobunaga Concerto - The Movie	Saburo / Oda Nobunaga / Akechi Mitsuhide	Leading role	
2016	Terra Formars	Dr. Ko Honda		
2016	Museum	Detective Hisashi Sawamura	Leading role	
2017	Reminiscence	Keita Tadokoro		
2017	Gintama	Gintoki Sakata	Leading role	
2017	Let Me Eat Your Pancreas	Haruki Shiga (adult)		
2018	Gintama Part 2	Gintoki Sakata	Leading role	
2018	Hibiki	Shunpei Yamamoto		
2019	Diner	Mateba		
2019	No Longer Human (ja)	Osamu Dazai	Leading role	
2019	The Confidence Man JP: The movie	Jewelry store person	Cameo appearance	
2020	The Voice of Sin	Eiji Akutsu	Leading role	
2020	The Untold Tale of the Three Kingdoms	Cao Cao		
2021	Godzilla vs. Kong	Ren Serizawa	Hollywood debut	
2021	Character	Shunsuke Seida		
2021	My Daddy	Private detective		
2023	Kingdom 3: The Flame of Destiny	Li Mu		
2023	Family	Takeo	Leading role	
2024	Kingdom 4: Return of the Great General	Li Mu		
2025	Frontline: Yokohama Bay	Hideharu Yuki	Leading role	
2026	Kingdom 5: The Clash of Souls	Li Mu		
2026	Bad Lieutenant: Tokyo	Kyoji Yabuki	Leading role; American-British-Japanese film	
2027	Leviathan	Senri Senda		

=== Animation ===
Year	Title	Role	Notes	Ref.
2005	Fullmetal Alchemist the Movie: Conqueror of Shamballa	Alfons Heiderich		
2006	Jyu-Oh-Sei	"Third"/Sigurd Heiza		
2006	Dōbutsu no Mori	Totakeke		
2006	The World of Golden Eggs	Emilio	Guest appearance (ep 21)	
2007	Wangan Midnight	Akio Asakura	Leading role	
2008	Highlander: The Search for Vengeance	Colin MacLeod	Leading role	
2010	Rainbow: Nisha Rokubou no Shichinin	Mario Minakami	Leading role	
2012	Doraemon: Nobita and the Island of Miracles—Animal Adventure	Shun Amaguri		
2012	Guskō Budori no Denki	Budori	Leading role	
2013	Space Pirate Captain Harlock	Captain Harlock	Leading role	
2014	Nobunaga Concerto	Narrator		
2014	Doraemon: New Nobita's Great Demon—Peko and the Exploration Party of Five	Sarbel		
2016	One Piece Film: Gold	Mad Treasure		
2018	Yo-kai Watch: Forever Friends	Shien		
2019	Weathering with You	Keisuke Suga		
2023	Totto-Chan: The Little Girl at the Window	Totto-Chan's father		
2026	Shin Gekijōban Keroro Gunsō: Fukkatsu Shite Sokkō Chikyū Metsubō no Kiki de Arimasu!	Gintoki Sakata		

=== Japanese dub ===
Year	Title	Role	Notes	Ref.
2007	Surf's Up	Cody Maverick	Leading role	

=== TV commercials ===
Year	Title	Role	Notes
2007	The Japan Commercial Broadcasters Association (formerly NAB (National Association of Commercial Broadcasters in Japan)); CM no CM campaign 4th series [Fresh] (Campaign 2007)		NAB's PSA "CM no CM" [Fresh] (Shun Oguri and Comasaru-kun); 15 sec.ad 240p "Oguri Shun ~ CM". YouTube evacion's channel. March 1, 2009. 360p
2008	Ezaki Glico "Glico Chocolate" "Sazae san 25 years later" campaign	Namino Ikura	Ad Playlist; Otona Glico Sazae san CM Playlist 大人グリコ 25年後の磯野家. YouTube, Sazae san Otona Glico CM playlist. April 4, 2014. Archived from the original on 2021-12-22.
2008	Nissan "Nissan Note x The World of Golden Eggs" collaboration campaign CM x DVD	Narrator	Nissan Note x The World of Golden Eggs; Eva Family (30 sec ver.) ノートCM エヴァファミリー篇. YouTube, yuutarouttt Channel. January 9, 2008. Archived from the original on 2021-12-22. Rose & Mary (30 sec ver) ノートCM ローズ&マリー篇. YouTube, yuutarouttt Channel. January 9, 2008. Archived from the original on 2021-12-22. Roberto and the coach (30 sec ver.); Nissan NOTE Commercial (The World of GOLDEN EGGS) - ロバート&教頭篇 (English sub). YouTube, yuutarouttt Channel. March 31, 2008. Archived from the original on 2021-12-22. Rose & Mary (radio ver.) 日産ノート ラジオCM The World of GOLDEN EGGS - ローズ&マリー. YouTube, yuutarouttt Channel. February 4, 2008. Archived from the original on 2021-12-22. "Nissan Note x The World of Golden Eggs" DVD back cover image "Nissan Note x The World of Golden Eggs DVD". mercari.com (in Japanese). Archived from the original on February 4, 2019.
2008	Au Sony Ericcson smartphones Sony Ericcson smartphones W61S / W62S smartphone (2008 Campaign)		W61S Cyber Shot smartphone 30 sec. version Sony Ericsson W61s Commercial. The Phone Commercials Classic YouTube channel. February 3, 2017. Archived from the original on 2021-12-22. 30 sec. version 小栗旬CM Sony Ericsson「W61S」30秒. anemone501 Twitter page. March 21, 2016. W62S Global Passport smartphone 30 sec. version "- YouTube" 小栗旬 Sony Ericsson W62S. jianji huang YouTube channel. October 6, 2013.
2009	Au Sony Ericcson Walkman smartphones Sony Ericcson smartphones Walkman Premiere³ (cube) smartphone (2009 Campaign)		Premiere³ (cube) smartphone 30 sec. version Shun Oguri as Orchestra conductor "au Walkman® Phone, Premier³ TVCM". YouTube vannesslala's channel. February 10, 2009. Archived from the original on 2021-12-22. Special Live at Sony Ericsson Walkman Phone press event on Feb. 12, 2009. Philharmonic Orchestra Conductor in a Concert Hall, feat. Ryota Fujimaki of Remioromen "Sakura by Shun Oguri Fill Harmony Orchestra with Ryota Fujimaki". YouTube Taro Matsumura's channel. February 13, 2009.
2009	Au Sony Ericcson smartphones Sony Ericcson smartphones Bravia U1 (2009 Campaign)		Bravia U1; 30 sec. version (CM) 小栗旬 - Sony Ericsson・BRAVIA Phone U1 30秒. GORINKUN0123CM YouTube channel. November 17, 2009. Archived from the original on 2021-12-22.
2009	Ezaki Glico "Glico Cheeza" "I Love Cheeza" (2009 campaign)		Glico Cheeza "I Love Cheeza"; 15 sec. CM "Glico I Love Cheeza CM 15s". YouTube Xu Chen's channel. May 24, 2011. 30 sec CM "小栗旬 CM グリコ チーザ 「I Love Cheeza」篇". YouTube 有馬誠's channel. May 24, 2011.
2011	Suntory Beverage Company; Tohoku Earthquake Charity Relief Campaign "Miagete goran yoru no hoshi wo" "Ue wo muite arukō"		Suntory Commercial compilation ""Ue wo Muite Arukou" & "Miagete Goran Yoru no Hoshi wo" in Suntory Commercials - Part 1". YouTube El Tiburón Grande channel. April 17, 2011. Archived from the original on 2021-12-22. ""Ue wo Muite Arukou" & "Miagete Goran Yoru no Hoshi wo" in Suntory Commercials - Part 2". YouTube El Tiburón Grande channel. April 17, 2011. Archived from the original on 2021-12-22.
2012	Adidas / ABC-Mart; Adidas Originals "All Originals 'L.A. TRAINER', 'ROD LAVER' & 'H3LIUM' 2012 Spring / Summer Campaign"		Adidas Originals; 15 sec. ad x 3 compilation "小栗旬 x Adidas Originals 2012". YouTube jianji huang channel. October 6, 2013.
2013	Suntory Beverage Company "Yamazaki Whiskey" "Otoko to onna" campaign		Suntory Yamazaki Whiskey "Otoko to onna" 60 sec. version ad いいなCM サントリー ウイスキー山崎 小栗旬 水原希子 「男と女」篇 60秒. YouTube 117cmVol6 channel. October 19, 2013. Archived from the original on 2021-12-22. 30 sec. version ad 小栗旬 CM サントリー 山崎 「男と女」. 哇砂糖 Bilibili channel. December 9, 2017.
2015	Ezaki Glico "Glico Pretz" "Aoi tori ~ Suki desu chun chun" (2015 Campaign)		Pretz "Aoi tori ~ suki desu chun chun" 30 sec CM and making of 小栗旬が「チュンチュン…」 “青い鳥”に？ 「プリッツ」新CM＆メーキング映像. YouTube Maidigi channel. February 23, 2015. Archived from the original on 2021-12-22.
2015	Kenshi Yonezu's 2015 album "Bremen" CM spot	Narrator	"Bremen" CM voice over "米津玄師 3rd Album「 Bremen 」2015.10.7 SPOT". YouTube Kenshi Yonezu's Official channel. October 4, 2015. Archived from the original on 2021-12-22.
2016	Ezaki Glico "Glico Pretz" "Neko ~ Nyaa" (2016 Campaign)		Pretz "Neko ~ Nyaa"; 30 sec CM and making of 小栗旬、猫になりきり「にゃあ」と鳴きまね 「三日三晩寝ずに考え、演じました」 「プリッツ」新TVCM. YouTube Maidigi channel. February 23, 2016. Archived from the original on 2021-12-22.
2016	Konami "Power Pros" (Jikkyō pawafuru puroyakyū) "Guki-!" / "Daijōbu" (2016 Campaign)		Power Pros (Jikkyō pawafuru puroyakyū) "Guki-!" / "Daijōbu"; 2 15 sec CM, comment and making of (Aoi Nakamura / Shun Oguri version) 小栗旬、心折れるポーズを全力披露「グキッ！」 中村蒼とサラリーマン役で居酒屋トーク モバイルゲーム『実況パワフルプロ野球』新CM「グキッ」篇＆「ダイジョーブ」篇＆メイキン. YouTube Oricon channel. March 2, 2016. Archived from the original on 2021-12-22. Power Pros (Jikkyō pawafuru puroyakyū) "Daijōbu"; 15 sec CM, comment and making of (Shun Oguri version) 小栗旬、ダイジョーブ博士に「大丈夫とは限らないんだよ」 出演 モバイルアプリ「実況パワフルプロ野球」新CM「ダイジョーブ」編 CM、メーキング映像. YouTube MaidigiTV channel. March 2, 2016. Archived from the original on 2021-12-22.
2016	NTT Solmare "Comic Cmoa"; Comic Cmoa x Oguri Shun - Nobunaga Concerto Movie tie up campaign		NTT Solmare "Comic Cmoa" x Oguri Shun - "Nobunaga Concerto Movie" tie up campaign 15 sec version ad 【日本CM】小栗旬投入地看自己主演《信長協奏曲》的原著漫畫？. 劍心放送 KenshinTV YouTube Channel ("Comic Cmoa" x Oguri Shun - "Nobunaga Concerto" tie up campaign 15 sec. version CM) (in Japanese). January 21, 2016. Archived from the original on 2021-12-22.
2017	Fujitsu "Arrows"; NX F-01K smartphone and Arrows Tab Tablet		Arrows smartphone and tablet cm 「割れない刑事(デカ)」 ("Warenai Deka" ~ Unbreakable Criminal) series (Co-starred with Takayuki Yamada); 1-30 sec. and 2-60 sec. version ads, plus "Behind the scenes" 小栗旬＆山田孝之、CM初共演で息ぴったりの刑事役 爆笑のおふざけ全開は必見 arrows新商品の新CM「割れない刑事(デカ)」. Oricon YouTube Channel (in Japanese). December 4, 2017. Archived from the original on 2021-12-22.
2017	Right-on "Jeans Planet" (Campaign 2017)		Right-On "Jeans Planet"; 30 sec. version ad "- YouTube" Right-on ライトオン CM 「JEANS PLANET」篇 30秒. THE JAPANESE TV COMMERCIAL ASSOCIATION YouTube Channel (in Japanese). October 30, 2018.
2017	Right-on "High-Class Outer" (Campaign 2017)		Right-On "High Class Outer"; 15 sec. version ad "- YouTube" 【小栗旬 CM 】Right on 「HIGH CLASS OUTER」篇 ムービー. commercialfree YouTube Channel (in Japanese). November 19, 2017.
2017	Pepsi "Strong Zero" "Momotaro's Story" campaign	Momotaro	Pepsi Strong Zero "Momotaro's Story"; Full version, 6-episode (from ep. 0) CM plus making of (Episode 4 features actor Jude Law as "Oni") [Momotaro's story] (Pepsi Strong Zero · Full version) Oguri Shun. YouTube / Studio D-Room (Edition) Channel (in Japanese and English). December 29, 2017. Archived from the original on 2021-12-22. Campaign launch event video 小栗旬、ペットボトルのふた開けられず苦笑 『ペプシストロング ゼロ』発売記念イベント. Oricon's Youtube Official Channel (in Japanese). June 9, 2015. Archived from the original on 2021-12-22.
2018	Right-on "Washi Denim" 『和紙の騎士篇』 (Washi no kishi-hen) (Campaign 2018)		"Washi denim" "Washi no kishi" 15 sec. version ad 【日本CM】小栗旬頭髮後梳手執純白武士刀慢動作斬斷和紙超帥氣. 劍心放送 KenshinTV YouTube Channel (in Japanese). January 18, 2018. Archived from the original on 2021-12-22.
2018	Right-on "Salasala Back Number" 『SALASALAで行こう篇』 (Salasala de ikou-hen) (Campaign 2018)		Right-On "Salasala Back Number"; 15 sec. version ad "Instagram" Right-on TVCM「SALASALAで行こう」篇. um_tokyo Official Instagram (in Japanese). March 22, 2018. Archived from the original on 2021-12-26.
2018	Right-on "Right-on 40th Anniversary" 「Re:American&Street」(Campaign 2018)		Right-On "Right-on 40th Anniversary ~ Re:American&Street"; 30 sec. version ad 【中字】TVCM │ Right-on 40周年 秋日的某一天篇. 高龄少年EK Bilibili Channel (in Japanese). September 10, 2018. 30 sec. version ad 【中字】TVCM │ Right-on 40周年 秋日的某一天篇. 高龄少年EK Bilibili Channel (in Japanese). September 10, 2018. 30 sec. version ad "Instagram" Right-on TVCM「ライトオン40周年 ある秋の日」篇. um_tokyo Official Instagram (in Japanese). September 10, 2018. Archived from the original on 2021-12-26.
2018	SMBC Bank—Barclays 「Have a good Cashless!」 "Thinking Man" Prologue (Campaign 2018)		SMBC Bank "Have a good Cashless! ~ Thinking man series" 60 sec. version ad TVCM「Thinking Man」篇 プロローグ(60秒). Mitsui Sumitomo Card YouTube official channel (in Japanese). October 27, 2018. Archived from the original on 2021-12-22. 30 sec. version ad TVCM「Thinking Man」篇 プロローグ(30秒). Mitsui Sumitomo Card YouTube official channel (in Japanese). October 27, 2018. Archived from the original on 2021-12-22.
2018	Right-on "Right-on 40th Anniversary" 『ライトオン40周年 冬の匂い篇』 (Men's Winter clothing ~ The smell of winter)(Campaign 2018)		Right-on "Right-on 40th Anniversary ~ Men's Winter clothing" 30 sec. version ad Right-on 40週年 代言人小栗 旬 2018冬季電視廣告. Right-on Taiwan official YouTube Channel (in Japanese). November 5, 2018. Archived from the original on 2021-12-22.
2018	Fujitsu "Arrows"; Arrows Be F-04K smartphone		Fujitsu Arrows 「割れない刑事(デカ)」 ("Warenai Deka" ~ Unbreakable Criminal) series' 4th video 「待てない刑事(デカ) ("Matenai deka")」 (Co-starred with Takayuki Yamada); 30 and 15 sec.ads, plus behind the scenes 小栗旬＆山田孝之、1分超のコミカルなアドリブ合戦！ 「割れない刑事」新CMメーキング公開. MaidigiTV YouTube Channel (in Japanese). December 18, 2018. Archived from the original on 2021-12-22.
2018	Suntory Beverage Company "Maker's Mark" メーカーズマーク『はじめての、クラフトバーボン』篇 (Suntory Maker's Mark CM “Hajimete no, craft bourbon”) (Campaign 2018)		Suntory "Maker's Mark~ Hajimete no, craft bourbon" 30 sec. version ad "- YouTube" メーカーズマーク『はじめての、クラフトバーボン』篇 30秒 小栗旬 手塚真生 サントリー CM. Suntory's Official YouTube Channel. March 7, 2019. 15 sec. version ad 小栗旬「はじめての、クラフトバーボン」／サントリーメーカーズマークCM1. moviecollectionjp YouTube Channel. March 11, 2018. Archived from the original on 2021-12-22.
2019	SMBC Bank—Barclays 「Have a good Cashless!」 "Thinking Man" 1st episode (Campaign 2018-2019)		SMBC Bank "Have a good Cashless! ~ Thinking Man Series" 1st. episode 60 sec. version ad "- YouTube" TVCM 「Thinking Man」篇 第1話(60秒). Mitsui Sumitomo Card YouTube official channel (in Japanese). January 2, 2010. Archived from the original on 2021-12-22. 30 sec. version ad "- YouTube" TVCM「Thinking Man」篇 第1話(30秒). Mitsui Sumitomo Card YouTube official channel (in Japanese). January 2, 2019. Archived from the original on 2021-12-22. Making of version "- YouTube" 「Thinking Man」篇 第1話 making. Mitsui Sumitomo Card YouTube official channel (in Japanese). January 2, 2019. Archived from the original on 2021-12-22.
2019	Right-on "Washi Denim" 『和紙との出会い篇』 (Washi no deai-hen) (Campaign 2019)		Right-on "Washi Denim ~ Washi no deai" 30 sec. version ad Right-on 代言人小栗旬_19SS和紙丹寧WASHI DENIM. Right-on Taiwan official YouTube Channel (in Japanese). January 22, 2019. Archived from the original on 2021-12-22. 15 sec. version ad "Instagram" Right-on TVCM「和紙との出会い」篇. um_tokyo official Instagram (in Japanese). January 15, 2019. Archived from the original on 2021-12-26.
2019	Suntory Beverage Company "Maker's Mark" 『小栗旬 世界で１本のボトルをつくる』 (Oguri Shun sekai de ippon no botoru o tsukuru) (Campaign 2019)		Suntory "Maker's Mark ~ Oguri Shun sekai de ippon no botoru o tsukuru" 43 sec. version ad "- YouTube" メーカーズマーク『小栗旬 世界で１本のボトルをつくる』篇 43秒 小栗旬 サントリー. Suntory's Official YouTube Channel. January 10, 2019. 35 sec. version ad "- YouTube" メーカーズマーク『小栗旬 世界で１本のボトルをつくる』篇 35秒 小栗旬 サントリー. Suntory's Official YouTube Channel. January 10, 2019.
2019	Right-on "Right-on Spring Campaign" 「春が来た、自由にいこう。」("Haru ga kita, jiyū ni ikou." (Campaign 2019)		Right-on "Haru ga kita, jiyū ni ikou" 30 sec. ad Right-on 代言人小栗旬_19SS 形象廣告. Right-on Taiwan official YouTube Channel (in Japanese). March 18, 2019. Archived from the original on 2021-12-22.
2019	Suntory Beverage Company "Maker's Mark" メーカーズマーク『Tasting in the Dark』 (Maker's Mark [Tasting in the dark]) (Campaign 2019)		Suntory "Maker's Mark ~ Tasting in the Dark series" 1 min 43 sec. version ad "- YouTube" メーカーズマーク『Tasting in the Dark』篇 1分46秒 小栗旬 サントリー CM. Suntory's Official YouTube Channel. March 27, 2019.
2019	SMBC Bank—Barclays 「Have a good Cashless!」 "Thinking Man" 2nd episode (Campaign 2018-2019)		SMBC Bank "Have a good Cashless! ~ Thinking Man Series" 2nd episode 60 sec. version ad TVCM 「Thinking Man」篇 第2話（60秒）. Mitsui Sumitomo Card YouTube official channel (in Japanese). February 28, 2019. Archived from the original on 2021-12-22. 30 sec. version ad TVCM │ 「Thinking Man」篇 第2話（30秒）. Mitsui Sumitomo Card YouTube official channel (in Japanese). February 28, 2019. Archived from the original on 2021-12-22. Making of version 「Thinking Man」篇 第2話 making. Mitsui Sumitomo Card YouTube official channel (in Japanese). February 28, 2019. Archived from the original on 2021-12-22.
2019	Right-on 『夏のガレージハウス篇』 (Natsu no garage house-hen) 「夏は、1番快適な服を。」 ("Natsu wa, 1-ban kaitekina fuku o.") (Summer Campaign 2019)		Right-on "Natsu no garage house" 30 sec. version ad Right-on 代言人小栗旬_2019 SUMMER 形象廣告. Right-on Taiwan official YouTube Channel (in Japanese). May 6, 2019. Archived from the original on 2021-12-22.
2019	Fujitsu; Arrows Be3 F-02L smartphone 富士通 arrows 割れない刑事「銃撃篇」 (Fujitsu Arrows "Warenai deka ~ jūgeki-hen") (campaign 2019)		Fujitsu Arrows 「割れない刑事(デカ)」 ("Warenai Deka" ~ Unbreakable Criminal) series "Jūgeki" version (Co-starred with Takayuki Yamada); Image ad "Instagram" 2019年春夏モデル. Instagram Docomo Ueno Station Store official page (Archive link is from mirror site) (in Japanese). May 6, 2019. Archived from the original on May 30, 2019. 15 sec ad "- YouTube" 富士通 arrows 割れない刑事「銃撃篇」15秒. YouTube Fujitsu Mobile Official Channel (in Japanese). June 6, 2019. 30 sec ad "- YouTube" 富士通 arrows 割れない刑事「銃撃篇」30秒. YouTube Fujitsu Mobile Official Channel (in Japanese). June 6, 2019.
2019	Suntory Beverage Company "Maker's Mark" メーカーズマーク『Tasting in the Dark』 (Maker's Mark [Tasting in the dark] 「父の日には、ちょっといいものを」篇 "Otousan no hi ni ha, chotto ii mono wo" hen) (Campaign 2019)		Suntory "Maker's Mark ~ Tasting in the Dark Series"; 1 min version ad "- YouTube" メーカーズマーク『Tasting in the Dark』篇 60秒 小栗旬 サントリー CM. Suntory's Official YouTube Channel. May 30, 2019.
2019	SMBC Bank—Barclays 「Have a good Cashless!」 "Thinking Man" 3rd episode (Campaign 2019)		SMBC Bank "Have a good Cashless! ~ Thinking man series" Episode 3; 60 sec. version ad 【TVCM】「Thinking Man」篇 第3話 ＜60秒＞【三井住友カード公式】. Mitsui Sumitomo Card YouTube official channel (in Japanese). May 31, 2019. Archived from the original on 2021-12-22. 30 sec. version ad 【TVCM】「Thinking Man」篇 第3話 ＜30秒＞【三井住友カード公式】. Mitsui Sumitomo Card YouTube official channel (in Japanese). May 31, 2019. Archived from the original on 2021-12-22.
2019	Ajinomoto; Fresh Frozen 「ザ★チャーハン」 (The ★ Chahan) 「いいね」 (Ii ne) (2019 Campaign)		Ajinomoto "The ★ Chahan" "Ii ne" 15 and 30 sec CM 小栗旬の妹・木崎ゆりあ登場！チャーハンに息の合った「いいね」 味の素「ザ★チャーハン」新TVCM. YouTube Oricon channel. July 31, 2019. Archived from the original on 2021-12-22.
2019	Chubu Electric Power 暮らしレボリューション (Kurashi reboryūshon); Gas and electricity ads キーワード篇 (kīwādo-hen) (2019 Campaign) オール電化篇 (ōru denka-hen) 電気＆ガス篇 (denki& gasu-hen)		Chubu Electric Power "Kurashi reboryūshon" (Lifestyle revolution) "Keyword" version 60 sec CM "- YouTube" 暮らしレボリューション【キーワード篇60秒】. Chubu Electric Power YouTube Official channel. October 1, 2019. "Keyword" version 30 sec CM "- YouTube" 暮らしレボリューション【キーワード篇３０秒】. Chubu Electric Power YouTube Official channel. October 1, 2019. "All Electric" version 30 sec CM "- YouTube" 暮らしレボリューション【オール電化篇30秒】. Chubu Electric Power YouTube Official channel. October 1, 2019. "Gas and electric" version 30 sec CM "- YouTube" 暮らしレボリューション【キーワード篇30秒】. Chubu Electric Power YouTube Official channel. October 1, 2019. "Making of" version "- YouTube" 暮らしレボリューション【オール電化篇30秒】. Chubu Electric Power YouTube Official channel. October 1, 2019.
2019 - 2020	Suntory Beverage Company; Maker's Mark メーカーズマーク『いいことあったら』 (Maker's Mark "Ii koto attara") (campaign 2019 ~ 2020 (Re-issue))		Suntory "Maker's Mark" "Ii koto attara" cm 30 sec version CM "- YouTube" メーカーズマーク『いいことあったら』篇 30秒 小栗旬 サントリー CM. Suntory YouTube Official channel. February 28, 2020. Archived from the original on 2021-12-22. 15 sec version CM "- YouTube" メーカーズマーク『いいことあったら』篇 15秒 小栗旬 サントリー CM. Suntory YouTube Official channel. February 28, 2020. Archived from the original on 2021-12-22.
2019	Taisho Pharmaceutical; Taishō Kanpō Gastrointestinal; CM「もたれる朝」篇 (Taisho Kanpo "Motareru Asa" version) (campaign 2019)		Taisho Pharmaceutical Taisho Kanpo "Motareru Asa" CM; 30 sec.version "- YouTube" 小栗旬さん出演 大正漢方胃腸薬 CM「もたれる朝」篇 30秒. taishomovie (Taisho Pharma CMs) YouTube Official channel. November 24, 2019. 15 sec.version "- YouTube" 小栗旬さん出演 大正漢方胃腸薬 CM「もたれる朝」篇 15秒. taishomovie (Taisho Pharma CMs) YouTube Official channel. November 24, 2019.
2020	Ajinomoto; Fresh Frozen 「ザ★シュウマイ」 (The ★ Shumai) シュウマイのうまい店篇 (Shūmai no umai mise-hen) (2020 campaign)		Ajinomoto Fresh Frozen "The ★ Shumai" "Shūmai no umai mise" version 30 sec CM "- YouTube" 「ザ★®シュウマイ」シュウマイのうまい店篇 30秒版. 味の素冷凍食品公式チャンネル（FFA AJINOMOTO OFFICIAL）YouTube Official channel. February 6, 2020. Archived from the original on 2021-12-22. 15 sec.version "- YouTube" 「ザ★®シュウマイ」シュウマイのうまい店篇 15秒版. 味の素冷凍食品公式チャンネル（FFA AJINOMOTO OFFICIAL）YouTube Official channel. February 6, 2020. Archived from the original on 2021-12-22. "Making of" video "- YouTube" 「ザ★シュウマイ」シュウマイのうまい店篇 メイキング. 味の素冷凍食品公式チャンネル（FFA AJINOMOTO OFFICIAL）YouTube Official channel. August 9, 2017. Archived from the original on 2021-12-22.
2020	Suntory Beverage Company; Maker's Mark メーカーズマーク『父の日』 (Maker's Mark "Chichi no hi") (campaign 2020)		Suntory "Maker's Mark" "Chichi no hi" cm 30 sec version CM "- YouTube" メーカーズマーク『父の日』篇 30秒 小栗旬 サントリー CM. Suntory YouTube Official channel. June 1, 2020. 60 sec version CM "- YouTube" メーカーズマーク『父の日』篇 60秒 小栗旬 サントリー CM. Suntory YouTube Official channel. June 1, 2020.

== Bibliography ==
=== Photo books ===
- So (October 27, 2003)
- Oguri Note (December 26, 2006)
- High (September 21, 2007)
- Shun x Genji (October 2007)
- Mika's Daydreaming Theater, Mika Ninagawa, Shueisha, 2008

=== Books ===
- Dōkyū sei: Aoi no Foto Essei Series -Personart- (March 25, 2005)
- Oguri Shun First Stage (September 27, 2006)

=== Essays ===
- I love movie, You love movie? in Shukan Zipper
- Oguri Shunpo Danyū Kurabu (Kinema Shunpo-sha)

== Stage ==
Year	Title	Role	Notes	Ref.
1998	Color	Jū Yamazaki		
2000	Jinsei wa Gatagoto Ressha ni Notte			
2003	Uchū de Ichiban Hayai Tokei	Fox-Trot		
2003	Hamlet	Fortinbras		
2004	Joker	Mitsuhashi		
2004	As You Like It	Orlando		
2005	Gūzen no Ongaku	Jack Pozzi		
2006	The Comedy of Errors	Antipholus of Ephesus, Antipholus of Syracuse	Leading role, dual role	
2006	Titus Andronicus	Aaron		
2007	As You Like It	Orlando		
2007	Caligula	Caligula	Leading role	
2008	Musashi	Sasaki Kojirō		
2011	A Clockwork Orange	Alex DeLarge	Leading role	
2011	Dokurojo no Shinichijin aka Seven Souls in the Skull Castle	Sutenosuke	Leading role	
2013	Akai kurayami ~ tengu tō maboroshi Tan ~	Daiichiro	Leading role	
2014	One Flew Over the Cuckoo's Nest	Randle P. McMurphy	Lead role	
2015	Red	Ken	Second Lead	
2017	Young Frankenstein (Musical)	Dr. Frankenstein	Lead role	
2017	Dokurojo no Shinichijin aka Seven Souls in the Skull Castle	Sutenosuke	Leading role	
2022	King John	Philip	Play was scheduled for 2020, but it was canceled due to the COVID pandemic. Opened on December 26, 2022. It was also broadcast on Wowow.	
2026	Inokorigumi (いのこりぐみ)			

== Radio ==
Nippon Broadcast System's All Night Nippon

- 小栗旬のオールナイトニッポンR (Oguri Shun's All Night Nippon R) (November 4, 2006)
- 小栗旬のオールナイトニッポン (Oguri Shun's All Night Nippon) January 3, 2007 - March 31, 2010)
  Audio of the first program, starring Shun Oguri, with guest Mao Inoue, and comments by other "Hana Yori Dango" co-stars
  小栗旬のオールナイトニッポン 第1回 ゲスト:井上真央 2007/01/03 1/2. youtube (in Japanese). April 15, 2012. Archived from the original on 2021-12-22.
  小栗旬のオールナイトニッポン 第1回 ゲスト:井上真央 2007/01/03 2/2. youtube (in Japanese). April 15, 2012. Archived from the original on 2021-12-22.
- 小栗旬のオールナイトニッポン シュアリー・サムデイ公開直前スペシャル (Oguri Shun's All Night Nippon Surely Someday pre-release Special) (July 14, 2010 ニッポン放送・2010年7月14日)
- 小栗旬と長澤まさみのオールナイトニッポン 映画「岳」スペシャル (Oguri Shun and Nagasawa Masami's All Night Nippon Movie "Gaku: Minna no Yama" Special) (May 4, 2011)
- 小栗旬のオールナイトニッポンGOLD〜映画ルパン三世スペシャル〜 (Oguri Shun's All Night Nippon GOLD "Lupin the 3rd" Movie Special) (August 29, 2014)
- 小栗旬 のオールナイトニッポン 映画「ミュージアム」公開前夜祭 (Oguri Shun's All Night Nippon "Museum" Movie Public viewing eve Special) (November 11, 2016)

== Videogames ==
Year	Title	Role	Notes
2016	Yakuza 6 (Ryu ga Gotoku 6: Inochi no uta)	Takumi Someya	Trailer video PS4専用ソフト『龍が如く6 命の詩。』ティザーPV. YouTube Ryu ga Gotoku Studio Official Channel (in Japanese). July 25, 2016. Archived from the original on 2021-12-22. Gameplay videos 1. "Yakuza 6: The Song of Life - Boss Battles: 9 - Takumi Someya (LEGEND)". YouTube devilleon7's Channel. March 16, 2018. Archived from the original on 2021-12-22.: 2. "Yakuza 6: The Song of Life - Boss Battles: 12 - Takumi Someya (LEGEND)". YouTube devilleon7's Channel. March 16, 2018. Archived from the original on 2021-12-22.; 3. "Yakuza 6: The Song of Life - Boss Battles: 19 - Takumi Someya (LEGEND)". YouTube devilleon7's Channel. March 21, 2018. Archived from the original on 2021-12-22.; Interview video PS4専用ソフト『龍が如く６ 命の詩。』小栗旬スペシャルインタビュー. YouTube Ryu ga Gotoku Studio Official Channel (in Japanese). August 12, 2016. Archived from the original on 2021-12-22.

== Awards and nominations ==
=== Acting awards and nominations ===
Year	Award	Category	Work(s)	Result	Ref.
2008	32nd Elan d'or Awards	Newcomer Award	Himself	Won	
2018	60th Blue Ribbon Awards	Best Supporting Actor	Let Me Eat Your Pancreas and Reminiscence	Nominated	
2020	45th Hochi Film Awards	Best Actor	The Voice of Sin	Won	
2020	33rd Nikkan Sports Film Awards	Best Actor	The Voice of Sin	Won	
2021	63rd Blue Ribbon Awards	Best Actor	The Voice of Sin	Nominated	
2021	44th Japan Academy Film Prize	Best Actor	The Voice of Sin	Nominated	
2023	16th Tokyo Drama Awards	Best Actor	The 13 Lords of the Shogun	Won	

=== Other awards and nominations ===
- Whiskey Hills Awards 2012' "Best Whiskey Lover"
  * Event video 小栗旬、観月ありさ、北方謙三登場 「ウイスキーヒルズアワード2012」. YouTube MaidigiTV's channel. March 1, 2009. Archived from the original on 2021-12-22.

== Other activities ==
- Tristone Fan Fes 2025 ～UNDOKAI～ (March 15, 2025, fan meeting/sporting event at Saitama Super Arena (team color green)) team captain
