= Boys Over Flowers 2 =

Japanese television series

- Also known as: Boys Over Flowers Returns; Hana yori Dango 2; Hana yori Dango Returns
- Japanese: 花より男子(だんご)2(リターンズ)
Transcriptions
- Romanization: Hana yori Dango Ritānzu
- Based on: Boys Over Flowers by Yoko Kamio
- Directed by: Yasuharu Ishii
- Starring: Mao Inoue; Jun Matsumoto; Shun Oguri; Shota Matsuda; Tsuyoshi Abe
- Theme music composer: Youth Case
- Opening theme: "Love So Sweet" by Arashi
- Composer: Kosuke Yamashita
- Country of origin: Japan
- Original language: Japanese
- No. of episodes: 11

Production
- Producer: Katsuaki Setoguchi
- Production location: Japan
- Running time: Fridays at 22:00
- Production company: TBS

Original release
- Network: JNN (TBS)
- Release: 5 January – 16 March 2007

Related
- Boys Over Flowers (2005); Hana yori Dango Final: The Movie (2008); Meteor Garden (2001, Taiwan); Boys Over Flowers (2009, South Korea); Boys Over Flowers Season 2 (2018, Japan); F4 Thailand: Boys Over Flowers (2021, Thailand)

Boys Over Flowers 2 (花より男子(だんご)2(リターンズ), Hana yori Dango 2 (Ritānzu); "Boys Over Flowers Returns") is a Japanese television drama series broadcast on TBS in 2007. It is the sequel to the 2005 TV series Boys Over Flowers based on the original manga series by Yoko Kamio, and followed by the film Hana yori Dango Final: The Movie.

== Plot ==
Tsukasa left Japan for New York and realizes Tsukushi has not talked to him for one year. The other members of F4 persuade Tsukushi to meet Tsukasa there for Christmas, only to discover Tsukasa has become a completely different person. Later, Tsukasa's mother announces that they will return to Japan in celebration of his birthday party. Tsukasa gets engaged to the daughter of heir Okawahara, leaving Tsukushi in distress.

== Cast ==
=== Main cast ===
- Mao Inoue as Tsukushi Makino
- Jun Matsumoto as Tsukasa Domyōji
- Shun Oguri as Rui Hanazawa
- Shota Matsuda as Sōjirō Nishikawa
- Tsuyoshi Abe as Akira Mimasaka

=== Supporting cast ===
- Aki Nishihara as Yūki Matsuoka
- Natsuki Katō as Shigeru Okawahara
- Mayumi Sada as Shizuka Tōdō
- Saki Seto as Yuriko Asai
- Aki Fukuda as Erika Ayuhara
- Emiko Matsuoka as Minako Yamamo
- Megumi Sato as Sakurako Sanjo
- Nanako Matsushima as Tsubaki Domyōji
- Mariko Kaga as Kaede Domyōji
- David Itō as Nishida
- Takako Kato as Sachiyo Sengoku (Okami-San)
- Susumu Kobayashi as Haruo Makino
- Mako Ishino as Chieko Makino
- Satoshi Tomiura as Susumu Makino

=== Guests ===
- Toma Ikuta as Oribe Junpei (Episode 1)
- Takahiko Yanagisawa as Junpei's older brother (Episode 1)
- Daiki Nakae as Shingo Oribe (Episode 1)
- Tomohiro Kaku as Shingo Sawatari, the bully student (Episode 1)
- Yurie Fujisaki as Miki Maesa (Episode 1)
- Kazuki Hagiwara (Episode 1)
- Aya Oomasa as student of Class 3-C
- Michi Saito as student of Class 3-C
- Shing Tsurumi as Ken Uchida (Domyoji Group Employee, Episode 1-10)
- Mai Suigetsu as Uchida's Wife (Episodes 1–6)
- Honoka Hashida as Uchida's Child (Episodes 1–6)
- Midori Miyazaki as Uchida's Child (Episodes 1–6)
- Satoshi Asaoka (Episodes 1 and 2)
- Tomomi Nishimura as Akira's mother (Episode 3)
- Imari Kitayama as Akira's sister (Episode 3)
- Himawari Kitayama as Akira's sister (Episode 3)
- Shihori Kanjiya as Hinata Sara (Episodes 3–7)
- Katsuhiko Sasaki as Shigeru's Father (Episodes 3 and 8)
- Yumi Mitani as Shigeru's Mother (Episodes 3 and 8)
- Nako Mitsuwa as Miyuki (Episode 5)
- Sumie Sasaki as Tama (Episodes 6 and 9)
- Shinpei Asanuma as the Principal of Hidenori Gakuen (Episode 6)
- Yatsu Isao (Episode 6)
- Yoko Yasuda (Episode 6)
- Yukino Saito as a friend of F4 (Episode 6)
- Konomi Morita as a friend of F4 (Episode 6 and 7)
- Kei Tanaka as Hinata's fiancé (Episode 7)
- Yakura Akira as The Husband of Tama (Episode 8)
- Natsuko Tanaka as Young Tama (Episode 8)
- Hajime Okayama as Yuuki's father (Episode 9)
- Rie Hiki as Yuuki's Mother (Episode 9)
- Kei Yamamoto (Episode 10)
- Erika Toda as Nakashima Umi (Episodes 10 and 11)
- Koji Higashino as a Member of the Rescue Team (Episode 11)
- Toru Komoriya Toru as the reporter (Episode 11)

== Reception ==
=== Episode ratings ===
Episode	Subtitle	Ratings (Kanto)	Ratings (Kansai)	Ratings (Nationwide)
01	One year later... At last, it returns!! This time the stage is New York!! New developments in love and friendship full of ups and downs... –-But wasn't it supposed to be a happy ending!?	19.4	20.7	??.?
02	The Strongest Rival	20.1	19.6	??.?
03	Bye bye, Stupid Guy	19.2	19.9	??.?
04	Perilous Battle	23.1	20.6	??.?
05	We Like You	20.3	19.5	??.?
06	Confession Turns Chaotic!!	21.0	20.1	??.?
07	Once-in-a-lifetime First Love	21.0	21.1	??.?
08	The Love Square is Settled	22.7	20.8	??.?
09	Painful Goodbye in the Rain	22.3	20.8	??.?
10	Lost Memories	21.9	21.1	??.?
11	The World's Best Proposal Ever	27.6	26.0	??.?
Average	--	21.7	21.0	??.?

== Recognitions ==
Year	Ceremony	Category/Recipient
2007	52nd Television Drama Academy Awards	Best Drama
2007	Annual Drama Grand Prix Awards	Best Supporting Actor (Shun Oguri)
2007	16th Hashida Awards	Best Female Newcomer (Mao Inoue)
2007	16th Hashida Awards	Best Male Newcomer (Shun Oguri)
2007	10th Nikkan Sports Drama Grand Prix	Best Drama
2007	10th Nikkan Sports Drama Grand Prix	Best Actress (Mao Inoue)
2007	10th Nikkan Sports Drama Grand Prix	Best Supporting Actor (Jun Matsumoto)
2007	MTV Student Voice Awards	Best Actress (Mao Inoue)
2008	Japan Nickelodeon Kids' Choice Awards	Best Actress (Mao Inoue)
2008	Japan Nickelodeon Kids' Choice Awards	Best Actor (Shun Oguri)
