= List of Kyō no Go no Ni episodes =

The cover of the fourth DVD compilation of the anime adaptation released by King Records on March 25, 2009; the characters featured on the cover are Chika Koizumi (left) and Ryōta Satō (right)

Kyō no Go no Ni, the debut manga of Koharu Sakuraba, has been adapted into an OVA and an anime and has been adapted into another OVA in 2009. In 2006, Shinkūkan animated the OVA that was directed by Makoto Sokuza. Each episode of the OVA is presented in five distinct chapters except for the special. In 2008, the manga was readapted into an anime that was animated by Xebec, produced by Starchild Records, directed by Tsuyoshi Nagasawa, and written by Takamitsu Kouno. Each episode of the anime is presented in four distinct chapters except for the thirteenth episode. In April 2009, Kodansha announced that Xebec will produce an OVA adaptation of Kyō no Go no Ni, directed again by Tsuyoshi Nagasawa and written by Takamitsu Kouno. The plot focuses around everyday life of students of class 5-2 and more specifically around Ryōta and his group of friends over the course of their fifth grade.

The first OVA was released on DVD between March 24, 2006, and March 21, 2007, by Avex, entitled "1-3 Trimesters" (1-3学期) and "Spring Break" (春休み). A special audio track was included in the DVDs in which the female characters' voices are replaced by members of the idol unit Sweet Kiss; Chika's voice actor (Mai Kadowaki) is replaced by Saaya Irie; Yūki's voice actor (Mikako Takahashi) is replaced by Jessica; Kazumi Aihara's voice actor (Noto Mamiko) is replaced by Runa. Each DVD also has a special edit version that comes with an extra item or two. The DVD boxset was released on January 30, 2008. It included all four of the OVA adaptation's DVDs, an additional DVD entitled "Extracurricular Lesson" (課外授業) that included the extra chapter as well as an interview with the staff, and an additional CD which included: all three of the theme songs, all the tracks on the radio drama included with the special edit of the third OVA DVD volume, and a special wallpaper for a computer. The first OVA features one opening and two ending themes: "Baby Love" is used as the opening for all the episodes; "Yakusoku" is used as the first ending theme for the first two episodes; and "Sakura Iro Kaze" is used as the second ending theme for the last two episodes. In an interview, Mai Kadowaki said that "Sakura Iro Kaze" is the graduation song for class 5–2.

The anime ran from October 5, 2008, to December 28, 2008, on Tokyo Broadcasting System in Japan. The anime adaptation featured six main theme songs, one opening that was also used as an ending theme, and five different ending themes. "Nisemono" is used as the opening theme for all the episodes except the last which does not feature an opening theme. "secret base ~Kimi ga Kureta Mono~" is used as the first ending theme from episodes one through three. "Daibakuhatsu NO.1" is used as the second ending theme for episodes four and five. "Natsu Matsuri" is used as the third ending theme for episode six. "Yūyake Iro" is used as the third ending theme from episode seven to episode nine. "Negai" is used as the fifth ending theme from episode ten to episode twelve. Four DVDs were released from December 25, 2008, to March 25, 2009, each containing three episodes except for the last which contains four. Each DVD is assigned a season in chronological order beginning from spring. An official fanbook was released on December 22, 2008, by Kodansha with ISBN 978-4-06-375627-2 and Yūki, Chika, and Kazumi as the cover characters.

== OVA ==
No.	Episode segment titles	Original air date
1	"1st Period - 'Wiggle, Wiggle' / 2nd Period - 'Collarbones' / 3rd Period - 'Undefeated' / 4th Period - 'Dial' / 5th Period - 'Sneak Attack'"; Transliteration: "1 Jikan Me 'Gura Gura' / 2 Jikan Me 'Sakotsu' / 3 Jikan Me 'Makenashi' / 4 Jikan Me 'Memori' / 5 Jikan Me 'Damashiuchi'" (Japanese: 「1時間目「グラグラ」」 「2時間目「サコツ」」 「3時間目「マケナシ」」 「4時間目「メモリ」」 「5時間目「ダマシウチ」」)	March 24, 2006
Because Aihara has a loose baby tooth, she asks Ryōta to stay after school and uses him to help pull it out. During school, in order to shift the spotlight from himself, Ryōta claims that guys care about collarbones and not breasts. After losing the match against Natsumi during recess, Ryōta is forced to accompany her as punishment to run an errand during which they get locked in the P.E. supply closet. Megumi is worried about gaining three kilograms due to an incorrectly balanced scale. Chika tries to trick Ryōta into kissing her but is interrupted.
2	"1st Period - 'Superball' / 2nd Period - 'Dress Up' / 3rd Period - 'Observation Diary' / 4th Period - 'Smile' / 5th Period 'Invitation'"; Transliteration: "1 Jikan Me 'Sūpābōru' / 2 Jikan Me 'Kisekae' / 3 Jikan Me 'Kansatsu Nikki' / 4 Jikan Me 'Egao' / 5 Jikan Me 'Osasoi'" (Japanese: 「1時間目「スーパーボール」」 「2時間目「キセカエ」」 「3時間目「カンサツニッキ」」 「4時間目「エガオ」」 「5時間目「オサソイ」」)	June 23, 2006
Ryōta, winning a red superball, has a duel with Kōji to see who can bounce their superball the highest. Later at school, Ryōta, filling his bowl with soup to the brim, accidentally spills milk and soup on Megumi and Yūki. As he heads to going to apologize to them, he instead finds Natsumi who was stripped for a change of clothes by the two. At the Yūki's suggestion, Kazumi who at first is noting down in her diary her observations on the growth of a plant, begins to experiment on Ryōta as he sleeps. Having never seen her smile before, Ryōta, Kōji, Tsukasa, and Chika try to get Kazumi to smile through various means. Ryōta dreams that after school ends, he and Chika begin to walk home together for the first time in a while and end up going to her house. There he imagines that she begins making advances on him. When he wakes up, Chika asks him for his old keychain.
3	"1st Period - 'Library' / 2nd Period - 'Surprise' / 3rd Period - 'Sweet and Soft' / 4th Period - 'Flip' / 5th Period 'Cat's Paw'"; Transliteration: "1 Jikan Me 'Toshoshitsu' / 2 Jikan Me 'Nukiuchi' / 3 Jikan Me 'Ama Ama' / 4 Jikan Me 'Mekuri' / 5 Jikan Me 'Neko no Te'" (Japanese: 「1時間目「トショシツ」」 「2時間目「ヌキウチ」」 「3時間目「アマアマ」」 「4時間目「メクリ」」 「5時間目「ネコノテ」」)	January 24, 2007
Chika gets Ryōta to let her on his back so that she can reach a book on a high shelf. While warming up in the nurse's office, the girls decide to give each other a surprise physical. Struggling with a cold, Ryōta visits the nurse's office twice only to be repelled by the girls, who are measuring each other twice. Chika tries to trick people into eating chalk but Ryōta is the only who falls for it. After taking it out is anger on Chika's Valentine's Day chocolates, he later earns her forgiveness. After little kids flip their skirts, Yūki and Chika ask their friends for their opinions on what age to stop forgiving them. When asking the boys, they refuse to believe Ryōta has never done so. Yūki initiates a discussion of cats after seeing one earlier in the morning. After hearing Ryōta's complaints on the independence of cats, the girls try to convince him otherwise.
4	"1st Period - 'Framed' / 2nd Period - 'Comparing Heights' / 3rd Period - 'Three-Legged Race' / 4th Period - 'Pinky Promise - Part 1' / 5th Period 'Pinky Promise - Part 2'"; Transliteration: "1 Jikan Me 'Nureginu' / 2 Jikan Me 'Sekurabe' / 3 Jikan Me 'Sankyaku' / 4 Jikan Me 'Yubikiri Zenpen' / 5 Jikan Me 'Yubikiri Kōhen'" (Japanese: 「1時間目「ヌレギヌ」」 「2時間目「セクラベ」」 「3時間目「サンキャク」」 「4時間目「ユビキリ 前編」」 「5時間目「ユビキリ 後編」」)	March 21, 2007
When Megumi misplaces her bloomers, the girls blame the boys theft and begin searching their bags and person. Chika and Ryōta bet on who's the tallest. Even though Ryouta wins in overall height, he sulks over having short legs. Ryōta and Kōji decide to have a duel to see who could win the three-legged race at the sports festival. Ryōta remembers a pinky promise he and Chika had when they were little to get married when they grew up. Chika too remembers a similar promise. Ryōta misunderstands what memory Chika recalls, however they make up in the end.
5	"Turn on the Water"; Transliteration: "Mizu Kake" (Japanese: ミズカケ)	January 30, 2008
After a swimming lesson in PE class, Ryōta and Yūki struggle with washing their eyes as they are scared of water spouting from the tap they have to use. Having had to deal with Ryōta complaints of eyes stinging from the chlorine, Chika intervenes and she manages to trick Yūki into washing her eyes. However as she tries to force Ryōta to do the same, their friends cause Ryōta and Chika to have an accident. In trying to take revenge Ryōta accidentally causes Yūki to fall into the pool and in apology, he must give her his clothes so she can change out of her wet ones.

== Anime ==
No.	Episode segment titles	Original air date
1	"1st Period 'Loose' / 2nd Period 'Super Ball' / 3rd Period 'In High Spirits' / 4th Period 'Rainy Weather'"; Transliteration: "1 Jikan Me 'Guragura' / 2 Jikan Me 'Sūpābōru' / 3 Jikan Me 'Norinori' / 4 Jikan Me 'Ame Furi'" (Japanese: 「1時間目「グラグラ」」 「2時間目「スーパーボウル」」 「3時間目「ノリノリ」」 「4時間目「アメフリ」」)	October 5, 2008
Kazumi approaches Ryōta to request his accompaniment for some after-school tasks in order to dislodge a loose but recalcitrant baby tooth. One day after school in front of a convenience store, Ryōta avails his newly-won bright-red superball in a duel with Kouji's slightly-larger blue superball to see whose superball can bounce higher. During one afternoon in the absence of adult supervision, the students of class 5-2 soon abandon cleaning their classroom and begin simulating a rock concert using brooms as air guitars, much to Yūki's disappointment. Ryōta, Kōji, and Tsubasa forget their umbrellas on a rainy afternoon and ask Chika and Natsumi to help them out. However due to his size, Ryōta is unable to walk home with Kōji and Tsubasa and is invited to instead walk with Chika and Natsumi.
2	"5th Period 'Cat's Paws' / 6th Period 'Undefeated' / 7th Period 'Ball Washing' / 8th Period 'Wet Clothes'"; Transliteration: "5 Jikan Me 'Neko no Te' / 6 Jikan Me 'Make Nashi' / 7 Jikan Me 'Bōru Arai' / 8 Jikan Me 'Nureginu'" (Japanese: 「5時間目「ネコノテ」」 「6時間目「マケナシ」」 「7時間目「ボールアライ」」 「8時間目「ヌレギヌ」」)	October 12, 2008
While en route to school, Yūki encounters a playful cat that follows her to school. Ryōta does not understand what Yūki and her friends find so fascinating about felines. When they try to explain, the cat that followed Yūki to school unfortunately scratches his face. During recess, after scoring a football goal against Ryōta, Natsumi compels him to help her retrieve some plastic cones from the storage shed. While two search the inside for the cones that are lie beside the shed unnoticed, the PE teacher locks them in believing the shed to be empty. Taking advantage of Natsumi's nyctophobia, Ryōta engages in various antics to exact revenge for his earlier defeat to his later regret. As P.E. class draws to a close, Ryōta accidentally wanders into the midst of the girls changing in order to retrieve a football and is subsequently beaten. In the next class, Megumi is at a loss for where her gym bloomers could be. After jumping to the conclusion that the thief is one of their classmates, the girls initiate a search of all the boys' bags and person for the missing bloomers.
3	"9th Period 'Collarbone' / 10th Period 'Library Room' / 11th Period 'Lifting Skirts' / 12th Period 'Experiment'"; Transliteration: "9 Jikan Me 'Sakotsu' / 10 Jikan Me 'Toshoshitsu' / 11 Jikan Me 'Mekuri' / 12 Jikan Me 'Jikken'" (Japanese: 「9時間目「サコツ」」 「10時間目「トショシツ」」 「11時間目「メクリ」」 「12時間目「ジッケン」」)	October 19, 2008
Ryōta claims that collarbones are the best female corporeal quality in order to divert attention from himself when the boys of the class demand that he justify to the girls why guys like gravure magazines. At the end of school in the park, the girls and boys gather in their own individual groups to reflect on the matter. After Ryōta and Kōji are dragged to the library by Tsukasa, they encounter Chika who requests Ryōta's shoulders for a vertical boost. Because she fools around, Ryōta loses his balance and the two crash on to Kazumi. Seeing Kōji use a chair as an aid, the two launch into an argument over who is to blame for their accident. A pair of underclassmen boys rushing by to flip Yūki and Chika's skirts prompts the question of when children begin to exceed the age limit for excusing that kind of behavior. When they ask their friends, they receive many different and end up finding out to their disbelief that Ryōta has never flipped a girl's skirts before. Later, Chika decides to play a prank on Kōji by accidentally leaving a recently-purchased skirt on his desk. After the incident is resolved, Kōji suggests that they attempt this prank on Ryōta.
4	"13th Period 'Turn on the Water' / 14th Period 'Dress Up' / 15th Period 'Top and Bottom' / 16th Period 'Surprise Attack'"; Transliteration: "13 Jikan Me 'Mizu Kake' / 14 Jikan Me 'Kisekae' / 15 Jikan Me 'Ueshita' / 16 Jikan Me 'Damashiuchi'" (Japanese: 「13時間目「ミズカケ」」 「14時間目「キセカエ」」 「15時間目「ウエシタ」」 「16時間目「ダマシウチ」」)	October 26, 2008
At the conclusion of a watery P.E. lesson, Chika and Yūki find Ryōta struggling to wash the chlorine from his eyes as he is scared of the water burst. Having had to deal with Ryōta's resulting complaints, Chika attempts to intervene until their friends interfere. Later in class during lunch, Ryōta accidentally empties a carton of milk on Megumi and drops his overfilled soup bowl on Yūki. On his way to the nurse's office to apologize, he instead discovers Natsumi sleeping after being stripped by Megumi and Yūki for a change of clothes and is subsequently beaten by the two when they return. At the end of the school day, Ryōta and Natsumi argue over which is the correct method for taking off one's shirt, from the top or from the bottom respectively. While answering Kōji's question on their relationship, Ryōta emphatically declares that he and Chika are only childhood friends. Anguished upon hearing him say so, Chika unsuccessfully tries to trick Ryōta into kissing her.
5	"17th Period 'Smile' / 18th Period 'Shooting Star' / 19th Period 'Change of Clothes'"; Transliteration: "17 Jikan Me 'Egao' / 18 Jikan Me 'Nagareboshi' / 19 Jikan Me 'Kigae'" (Japanese: 「17時間目「エガオ」」 「18時間目「ナガレボシ」」 「19時間目「キガエ」」)	November 2, 2008
Ryouta, Kouji, Tsubasa, and Chika each mount an unsuccessful attempt to challenge the history of never having seen Kazumi laughing. At night while waiting for a meteor shower, Ryōta falls asleep and demonstrates his ability to force people to fall asleep. Before a swimming class, having forgotten her modesty poncho, Megumi is at loss as to how to change into her swimming suit until Yūki shows her the technique for changing without it. Having forgotten his modesty toga and wondering how to best put on his swimming trunks, Ryōta challenges Kouji to a contest of who can change from underwear into trunks the fastest.
6	"20th Period 'Observation Diary' / 21st Period 'Sudden Shower' / 22nd Period 'Rock Paper Scissors' / 23rd Period 'Summer Festival'"; Transliteration: "20 Jikan Me 'Kansatsu Nikki' / 21 Jikan Me 'Yūdachi' / 22 Jikan Me 'Janken' / 23 Jikan Me 'Natsumatsuri'" (Japanese: 「20時間目「カンサツニッキ」」 「21時間目「ユウダチ」」 「22時間目「ジャンケン」」 「23時間目「ナツマツリ」」)	November 9, 2008
Yūki suggests Kazumi observe a more dynamic event than flower growth - experimenting with different methods to wake Ryōta from his nap in spite of his earlier warning to do otherwise. After school one day, a game of dodgeball of boys against girls is interrupted by a sudden rainstorm that forces the children to take cover. However, they decide to continue to play; even Kazumi joins in. In the summer heat, Ryōta is challenged to several games of rock-paper-scissors with the penalty of fanning the winner. Ryouta's attempts to defy his constant losing streak land him in hot water with Chika who promptly beats him up for accidentally flipping her skirt. Ryōta, Kōji, and Tsubasa rush to the summer festival but arrive too early. Natsumi, Kazumi, Megumi, Chika, and Yūki arrive shortly thereafter dressed in their yukatas and both the boys and girls began to enjoy the festival together.
7	"24th Period 'Victory or Defeat' / 25th Period 'Cross-Fire' / 26th Period 'Bookstore' / 27th Period 'Three-legged'"; Transliteration: "24 Jikan Me 'Kachimake' / 25 Jikan Me 'Uchiai' / 26 Jikan Me 'Hon'ya' / 27 Jikan Me 'Sankyaku'" (Japanese: 「24時間目「カチマケ」」 「25時間目「ウチアイ」」 「26時間目「ホンヤ」」 「27時間目「サンキャク」」)	November 16, 2008
After Natsumi successfully blocks his football goal, Ryōta begins to frantically challenge her to various athletic activities, betting all the boys' lunch desserts. After facing defeat at every turn, Ryōta finally finds something he is better at -- embroidery. On the way back from school, Ryōta and Kōji decide to have a water gun fight, battling each other as leaders of their own individual teams. All proceeds smoothly until they soak the passing group of girls from their class with an errant blast of water. Out for revenge, the incensed girls march to the store to buy their own water guns and utterly defeat both teams of boys. While in front of a bookstore, Megumi debates over buying one of two volumes of manga she wants but solves her dilemma when she decides to share the cost of the two volumes with Kazumi. In the same store, Ryōta's debate on whether or not he will buy magazine meant for young kids containing an action series he wants is resolved toward buying it after seeing Tsukasa do the same. Challenged by Kōji who is partnered with Chika to who would win the school's sports festival event, the three-legged race, Ryōta practices obsessively with his partner Yūki only to end up in last place.
8	"28th Period 'Scale' / 29th Period 'Hunger' / 30th Period 'Height Comparison' / 31st Period 'Milk'"; Transliteration: "28 Jikan Me 'Memori' / 29 Jikan Me 'Hara Heri' / 30 Jikan Me 'Sekurabe' / 31 Jikan Me 'Gyūnyū'" (Japanese: 「28時間目「メモリ」」 「29時間目「ハラヘリ」」 「30時間目「セクラベ」」 「31時間目「ギュウニュウ」」)	November 23, 2008
Megumi stares at her uneaten lunch one day due to worries about her own weight. Out of concern, Ryōta investigates and discovers that the scale in the nurses office is improperly calibrated. While still dieting, Megumi's willpower is put to the test when Kazumi decides to record Megumi's reaction in her observation diary to various foods as well as experimenting to see if pain or laughter can displace hunger. At the end of class, Chika and Megumi decide to compare heights and find out that Chika has a slight height advantage. Because it was mentioned, Natsumi and Ryōta begin to worry about their own heights. To spite Ryōta, Kōji proposes that he compare heights with Chika ending in stalemate between Ryōta's win in overall height and Chika's longer legs. Natsumi begins to binge on milk in an attempt to develop her breasts, eliciting the awe of her classmates due to the volume and speed she can intake. This prompts Ryōta, goaded by Kōji, to engage in a milk-drinking contest which he loses.
9	"32nd Period 'Typhoon' / 33rd Period 'Fashion' / 34th Period 'Dozing Off' / 35th Period 'Eating'"; Transliteration: "32 Jikan Me 'Taifū' / 33 Jikan Me 'Fasshon' / 34 Jikan Me 'Utouto' / 35 Jikan Me 'Meshiagare'" (Japanese: 「32時間目「タイフウ」」 「33時間目「ファッション」」 「34時間目「ウトウト」」 「35時間目「メシアガレ」」)	November 30, 2008
The students of Class 5-2 attentively watch the TV broadcast on a nearby typhoon in hopes that it will pass over them and cancel afternoon classes, however the storm changes course. One day when Kōji is sick from a cold, Yūki comes to school dressed nicely after having visited a beauty salon looking for praise from her classmates. After school in the soporific summer heat, Yūki suggests to the boys that everybody play dodgeball together so as to stay awake. While playing a game, Kazumi twists her ankle by falling asleep standing. Unfortunately, Ryouta is made to piggyback transport home the sleeping Kazumi whose sleep talking earns him a glower of jealousy and a headbutt from Chika. Later during a home economics class, Yūki demonstrates her terrible culinary skills.
10	"36th Period 'Warmth' / 37th Period 'Fairy Tale (Anterior Semester)' / 38th Period 'Fairy Tale (Posterior Semester)' / 39th Period 'A Leaf'"; Transliteration: "36 Jikan Me 'Atatamete' / 37 Jikan Me 'Meruhen' / 38 Jikan Me 'Meruhen II' / 39 Jikan Me 'Hitoha'" (Japanese: 「36時間目「アタタメテ」」 「37時間目「メルヘン」」 「38時間目「メルヘンII」」 「39時間目「ヒトハ」」)	December 7, 2008
The cold weather and Natsumi's complaint of how hot she feels prompts several of the girls in the class to place their cold hands on her face. Ryōta's disparaging remarks about the girls' conduct diverts their reaching hands to him only to find that all their hands except for Kazumi's have already warmed up. Saliva sterilizing wounds seems to be a prevalent superstition throughout the grades. Yūki tries to get Chika to kiss Ryōta in order to heal his irritated eye, which results in Chika punching him. Some time later, Yūki finds Kazumi writing a fairy tale featuring all the main characters with Ryōta as a prince cursed with short legs and Chika as the princess about how the prince must goes through several trials in order to save the princess. One day, Kōji and Tsubasa rush to Ryōta for assistance in helping Natsumi deal with the morbid conclusion of a book she just read.
11	"40th Period 'Suddenly' / 41st Period 'Duck' / 42nd Period 'Hair Style' / 43rd Period 'Ice'"; Transliteration: "40 Jikan Me 'Nukiuchi' / 41 Jikan Me 'Kamo' / 42 Jikan Me 'Kamigata' / 43 Jikan Me 'Kōri'" (Japanese: 「40時間目「ヌキウチ」」 「41時間目「カモ」」 「42時間目「カミガタ」」 「43時間目「コオリ」」)	December 14, 2008
The dormant classroom heater prompts Yūki, Kazumi, Megumi, Natsumi, and Chika into the health office to warm up and then to begin measuring each other's corporeal dimensions after chasing the school nurse out. Ryōta is twice violently repelled by the girls from resting in the nurse's office due his deteriorating respiratory ailment. After school, some of the students of Class 5-2 discover a lone duck swimming in the school pool whom Kazumi names Kobayashi. When their attempts to send Kobayashi along with a flock of ducks flying overhead all fail and they began discussing how to take care of it, Kobayashi gets its own volition to fly. Yūki, Megumi, Haruka, and Chika interpret Kazumi coming to school one day with her hair in pigtails as license to stylize their own hair that initiates a competition between the four of them that lasts for over a week. Ryōta, Kouji, and Tsubasa engaging in their winter ritual of stomping the ice, before comparing for the biggest piece and then playing with it earns them an austere reprimand from Chika and Natsumi.
12	"44th Period 'Roasted Sweet Potato' / 45th Period 'Grinding Noises' / 46th Period 'Lottery' / 47th Period 'Munch Munch' / 48th Period 'Merry Christmas'"; Transliteration: "44 Jikan Me 'Yakiimo' / 45 Jikan Me 'Konkon' / 46 Jikan Me 'Fukubiki' / 47 Jikan Me 'Ama Ama' / 48 Jikan Me 'Meri Kuri'" (Japanese: 「44時間目「ヤキイモ」」 「45時間目「コンコン」」 「46時間目「フクビキ」」 「47時間目「アマアマ」」 「48時間目「メリクリ」」)	December 21, 2008
Yūki, Kazumi, Megumi, Natsumi, and Chika arrive at a store selling roasted sweet potatoes while walking down the street on a cold breezy day. Ryōuta, Kōuji, and Tsubasa's sudden appearance interrupts the girls' silent competition over a quintet of sweet potatoes spanning a spectrum of different sizes. During school, it begins to snow. While waiting for the snow to accumulate, the students of Class 5-2 become involved in a debate over the meaning of a childhood nursery causing them to be the last outside. Later in town, Ryōuta and Kazumi test their luck at the district lottery. After home economics class, Yuki tells Natsumi that chalk is edible. Chika stops her just in time and decides to see if Ryōuta would fall for the lie. Ryouta poorly handles the deception by lashing out at Chika's cooking to his regret. Fortunately after a few hours, Ryouta manages to win Chika's forgiveness by kissing her.
13	"49th Period 'Pinky Swear'"; Transliteration: "49 Jikan Me 'Yubikiri'" (Japanese: 49時間目「ユビキリ」)	December 28, 2008
Ryōuta dreams of a scene from his past involving a promise of marriage between him and Chika before waking up late and dashing to school. However, his euphoric morning is quickly extinguished when Yūki spreads the news of Chika having dreamt that same morning of a promise she made to Ryouta after he wet the bed when in kindergarten. Ryōuta lashes out at Kazumi pitying him for wetting his bed under the impression that everyone was talking about Chika remembering their promise to marry each other only to realize his mistake when Chika apologizes to him the next day. Ryouta begins to sulk until Chika approaching him alone at the end of the school day to cheer him up causes him to recall the other promise that he made with Chika after wetting his bed in kindergarten: to try his best to become a better man. Ryouta catching Chika as she is about to lose her balance while changing her shoes signals his decision to forgive her. Back from winter vacation, Chika begins wearing the hairpins that Ryōuta gave her as a christmas present.
OVA–2	"Treasure Chest Collection: Bugs and the Heat, Slowly Drifting, Stubborn, This Late"; Transliteration: "Takarabako Korekushon: 'Mushi to atsusa', 'Yukkuri to tadayotte iru', 'Ganko', 'Kon'nani osoku'" (Japanese: 宝箱コレクション: 虫と暑さ, ゆっくりと漂っていく, 頑固, こんな遅くに)	October 6, 2009
Weeding around the school's pool in the summer heat, is not really that much fun, observing bugs is far more interesting... In autumn, a maple leaf reminds Megumi of Ryouta's spiky hair, leading to some confusion, In winter, in a snowball fight, the boys get wiped out by the supposedly weak girls, by Natsumi in particular... In the spring, all good kids return home early from the playground, to watch their favourite new anime series on TV.
