= Sweet Kiss =

Sweet Kiss may refer to:

- Sweet Kiss (horse), a horse ridden in February 1923 at Belmont Park by Frank Hayes (jockey)
- Sweet Kiss (band), a Japanese pop group which includes Saaya Irie, a Japanese child model
- Sweet Kiss (Romanian band), a former Romanian Eurodance band in the 1990s 3rei Sud Est
- Sweet Kisses debut studio album by American pop singer Jessica Simpson
- Sweet Kisses (Sqeezer song)
