= Yoshika =

Yoshika (Japanese: よしか or ヨシカ) is a unisex given name of Japanese origin. It may refer to:

== People ==
- Yoshika (singer) (born 1983), a Japanese singer
- Yoshika Arai (born 1982), Japanese steeplechase runner
- Yoshika Katou, the stage name of Leilani Gaja in Japan
- Inoue Yoshika, (1845–1929) a career naval officer in the Imperial Japanese Navy
- Yoshika Matsubara (born 1974), a retired Japanese football player
- Miyako no Yoshika (834-879), a Japanese poet from the Heian period
- Yoshika Yuhnagi (1983-2001), a Japanese model

== Fictional characters ==
- Yoshika Miyafuji, one of the main characters in the anime adaptation of Strike Witches
- Yoshika Miyako, one of the main characters in Ten Desires from the Touhou Project series

== Place names ==
- Yoshika, Shimane, a town in Shimane Prefecture, Japan

== See also ==
- Yoshikane
- Yoshikazu
