= Love (Japanese band) =

Japanese musical duo

- Origin: Japan
- Genres: J-pop, R&B
- Years active: 2008–2012
- Labels: Sony Music Associated Records
- Members: Misaki, Stephanie
- Website: www.love-ldh.jp

Love was a Japanese pop/R&B vocal duo, produced by Hiro of Exile's production agency, LDH. They debuted in 2009 with the single "First Love: Love Letter." Their song "Tada Hitotsu no Negai Sae" was certified gold by the RIAJ for 100,000 full-length cellphone downloads.

The band's name comes from the first word in their production company (LDH)'s non-acronym name (Love Dream Happiness).

== Biography ==
The band was formed in 2008 by former Paradise Go!! Go!! member Misaki Matsumoto, and quarter Italian Stephanie. The pair met through production agency LDH, when they were given the roles of the two vocalists in a dance performance group called Real Force. When the plans for this unit fell through, the duo formed Love. Both members had been in the entertainment industry for over ten years.

The group's first activity together was releasing a cover of Zone's "Secret Base (Kimi ga Kureta Mono)" as a ringtone (as well as releasing the full version in a special CD attached to the August issue of Gekkan Exile magazine). A year later, the group released their debut single, "First Love: Love Letter," with this cover as a B-side.

The group's songs have been popular through digital markets, with all lead tracks from their singles reaching the top 5 on the RIAJ Digital Track Chart (including "Taisetsu na Kimochi" from their debut album Taisetsu na Kimochi which was not released as a physical single).

The duo have had two collaborations with Exile twice: once before their debut on the song "Love, Dream & Happiness" on Exile's compilation album Exile Ballad Best in 2008, and in 2009 Misaki recorded background vocals for Exile's song "If (I Know)" on their album Aisubeki Mirai e.

On the 28th of December 2012, it is announced that LOVE is dismissed after the year.

== Discography ==
=== Albums ===
| Year | Album Information | Oricon Albums Charts | Reported sales |
|---|---|---|---|
| 2010 | Taisetsu na Kimochi (大切なキモチ, Important Feelings): Released: April 14, 2010; Label: Onenation (AICL-2105/7); Formats: CD, digital download | 12 | 16,400 |

=== Singles ===
| Release | Title | Notes | Chart positions | | | Oricon sales | Album |
| Release | Title | Notes | Oricon Singles Charts | Billboard Japan Hot 100 | RIAJ digital tracks | Oricon sales | Album |
|---|---|---|---|---|---|---|---|
| 2009 | "First Love: Love Letter" (First Love ～ラブレター～, Rabu Retā) | | 50 | 12 | 5 | 3,900 | Taisetsu na Kimochi |
| 2009 | "Second Love: Tada Hitotsu no Negai Sae" (Second Love ～ただ一つの願いさえ～, Just One Wish) | | 35 | 45 | 4 | 6,400 | Taisetsu na Kimochi |
| 2010 | "Watashi Au Mono" (わたしあうもの, Things That Suit Me) | | 23 | 27 | 4 | 5,800 | Taisetsu na Kimochi |
| 2010 | "Taisetsu na Kimochi" (大切なキモチ, Important Feelings) | Digital download. | — | — | 2 | — | Taisetsu na Kimochi |
