= List of Minami-ke episodes =

Minami-ke (2007) Japanese DVD volume 1 cover

This is a list of episodes for the anime Minami-ke, a story about the everyday lives of the three Minami sisters who live on their own and the problems they face in everyday life with their friends at school and at home. The manga, created by Koharu Sakuraba, was adapted into an anime series by three studios.

The anime series consists of four seasons. Each of them spanning 13 episodes. The first season produced by Daume first aired on October 7, 2007, and was directed by Masahiko Ohta. The second season was produced by Asread, was directed by Naoto Hosada, and first aired January 6, 2008. The third season, also produced by Asread, aired January 4, 2009, and features Kei Oikawa as the director. The fourth season produced by Feel first aired on January 6, 2013, and features Keiichiro Kawaguchi as the director.

== Episode list ==
=== Minami-ke (2007) ===
No.	Title	Original release date
1	"The Three Minami Sisters"; Transliteration: "Minami-san-chi no San Shimai" (Japanese: 南さんちの三姉妹)	October 7, 2007
The three Minami sisters and some of their friends are introduced.
2	"Weird School"; Transliteration: "Okashi na Gakkō" (Japanese: おかしな学校)	October 14, 2007
The Minami sisters' daily school life is shown. Some of their classmates are introduced as well.
3	"The Delinquent Football Player Returns"; Transliteration: "Tama Keri Banchō Futatabi" (Japanese: 球蹴り番長再び)	October 21, 2007
Kana makes Fujioka do contests to see who is better at studies, and Fujioka wins all of them. Fujioka admits that he likes Kana after she wakes up from a nap at school. Kana runs home then asks Chiaki what Fujioka meant by "I really like you." The next day Kana invites Fujioka over for dinner, Kana ends up kicking Fujioka out.
4	"The Pattern of Love"; Transliteration: "Koi Moyō" (Japanese: 恋もよう)	October 28, 2007
A Ninomiya-kun and Sensei video game challenge between Chiaki and Kana takes place. Takeru visits Minami family. Riko has a crush on Fujioka, but is frustrated by his relationship with Kana. Meanwhile, Hosaka imagines what it is like to be a part of Minami family.
5	"Let's Go to the Beach"; Transliteration: "Umi ni Ikō yo" (Japanese: 海に行こうよ)	November 4, 2007
It is really hot and the Minami family decides to take a trip to the beach. Their swimsuits are too small. Kana and Chiaki go buy swimsuits, while Haruka makes dinner. Kana buys Haruka a two-piece swimsuit.
6	"The Birth of Mako-chan"; Transliteration: "Mako-chan Tanjō" (Japanese: マコちゃん誕生)	November 11, 2007
Chiaki invites her friends over to work on home work. Kana asks Makoto what type of girls he prefers. Haruka comes in and Makoto decides to help Haruka cook. The next day Chiaki ignores Makoto the whole day. Makoto comes over with Uchida the next day and Kana dresses him up like a girl.
7	"Various Faces"; Transliteration: "Iroiro na Kao" (Japanese: いろいろな顔)	November 18, 2007
Kana teaches Chiaki's friends about how to deal with a suspicious man. Meanwhile, Haruka's legendary past in her junior high school is revealed.
8	"Hosaka" (Japanese: ほさか)	November 25, 2007
Hosaka tries to get close to Haruka by making impressive bentos for her.
9	"Three Sister Weather"; Transliteration: "San Shimai Biyori" (Japanese: 三姉妹日和)	December 2, 2007
The Minami sisters' daily life at home is shown.
10	"Boy × Girl"; Transliteration: "Otoko no Ko × Onna no Ko" (Japanese: おとこのこ×おんなのこ)	December 9, 2007
Toma, a tomboy from another Minami family, is introduced while Makoto is still pretending to be a girl in front of Haruka.
11	"The Neighboring Minamis"; Transliteration: "Tonari no Minami-san" (Japanese: となりの南さん)	December 16, 2007
The Neighboring Minamis are introduced.
12	"Christmas Along with Eve"; Transliteration: "Kurisumasu toka Ibu toka" (Japanese: クリスマスとかイブとか)	December 23, 2007
The Minami family and the neighboring Minami family are having their own Christmas eve.
13	"Fruitless Love"; Transliteration: "Koi no Karamawari" (Japanese: 恋のからまわり)	December 30, 2007
The Minami family celebrate New Year's, while Hosaka makes a soba noodle dish to impress Haruka.

==== Theme songs ====
Opening theme

- "Keikenchi Jōshōchū☆" (経験値上昇中☆; lit. 'The Rise of the Value of Experience')
  - Performed by: Rina Satō, Marina Inoue, and Minori Chihara
  - Lyricist: Uran
  - Composition and arrangement by: Kaoru Okubo
  - Released October 24, 2007

Ending theme

- "Colorful Days" (カラフルDAYS, Karafuru Days)
  - Performed by: Rina Satō, Marina Inoue, and Minori Chihara
  - Lyricist: Uran
  - Composition by: Akirahiko Yamaguchi
  - Arrangement by: Tomoki Kikuya

=== Minami-ke: Okawari (2008) ===
No.	Title	Original release date
1	"Hot Springs, Let's Eat Here"; Transliteration: "Onsen, Itadakimasu" (Japanese: 温泉、いただきます)	January 6, 2008
The Minami sisters, Makoto, Touma, Fujioka, and Takeru go on a hot spring trip for New Years. Fujioka accidentally goes into the woman's bath and sees Kana. He has become totally confused.
2	"Flavor is Inherited from Generation to Generation"; Transliteration: "Aji wa Daidai Uketsugarete Iku Mono" (Japanese: 味は代々受け継がれていくもの)	January 13, 2008
Kana decides to help her sister become the Great Bancho once more by making the Kana army, but Chiaki on the other hand couldn't help because she considered her friends useless. In the end of the episode they find out Haruka was just refusing a phone call to become class rep.
3	"Evening Hospitality, Extend the Bowl Hesitantly"; Transliteration: "Motenashi no Yoru, Sotto Dashi" (Japanese: もてなしの夜、そっと出し)	January 20, 2008
Chiaki's classmates invite themselves to the Minami home for a group homework session and sleepover. Kana declares it a 'pajama festival' and puts herself in charge of hospitality, to Chiaki's annoyance. To feed all her guests, Haruka prepares a family-style nabe meal, and she invites Fujioka and Makoto to dinner. Everyone has a good time, but no-one gets much homework done.
4	"Is It All Right to Clean Up?"; Transliteration: "Katazuke Chatte Ii desu ka?" (Japanese: 片付けちゃっていいですか?)	January 27, 2008
During a routine garbage disposal trip, Haruka encounters a boy of Chiaki's age named Fuyuki who is warmly praised by his neighbors for his willingness to freely volunteer his assistance. It is during this encounter that Fuyuki's participation in the weekend neighborhood clean-up is mentioned. Kana's reluctance to take part prompts Haruka to force her and Chiaki to also participate. Later on, Kana summons a few of her classmates, as well as Chiaki's friends to lighten the workload. During the actual clean-up event, it becomes apparent that the work crew Kana assembled was so that Kana could watch while everybody else does all the work.
5	"Can't Take Back a Served Tea Cup"; Transliteration: "Dashita Chawan wa Hikkomerarenai" (Japanese: 出した茶碗は引っ込められない)	February 3, 2008
Kana and Chiaki break a glass rabbit necklace that Haruka had bought. Worried that the rabbit was a gift to Haruka that she treasures, both Kana and Chiaki try to repair the rabbit. After the repairs go badly, Kana tries to get Fujioka, Keiko, and Uchida to look for another to replace the broken rabbit. In the end, Haruka discovers the truth.
6	"Has My Rice Already Cooled Down?"; Transliteration: "Sametemo Attaka, Uchi Gohan" (Japanese: 冷めてもあったか、ウチゴハン)	February 10, 2008
The power goes out and the Minami sisters invite Fuyuki over.
7	"The More You Chew It, The Sweeter It Becomes"; Transliteration: "Kameba Kamu Hodo Amaku Narun da yo" (Japanese: 噛めば噛むほど甘くなるんだよ)	February 17, 2008
It's Valentines Day and the Minami sisters, Yoshino, Uchida and Mako-chan are making chocolates to give out. Kana tries to eat Fujioka's chocolates, but he tries to keep them a secret from her, hoping that Kana will give him chocolate.
8	"The Pool Gives Me a Second Stomach"; Transliteration: "Pūru wa Betsubara desu" (Japanese: プールは別腹です)	February 24, 2008
A local shop owner gives Haruka tickets to a new indoor pool. We learn that Chiaki doesn't know how to swim and doesn't want the others to find out. Later, Kana tries to teach Chiaki how to swim and help Chiaki meet her goal to swim 25 meters. Haruka sleeps the entire time, trying to ignore her sisters, until her highschool friends throw her into the pool.
9	"Does It Hurt Yet? Secrets of Mako-chan"; Transliteration: "Sorosoro Kurushii? Himitsu no Mako-chan" (Japanese: そろそろ苦しい? ひみつのマコちゃん)	March 2, 2008
Kana believes she has prophetic dreams and can predict the next nights dinner. Makoto is almost caught crossdressing by Yoshino, and Kana worries whether she is a bad influence on Makoto. Haruka is told that she has been selected to study abroad and is having a hard time with the prospect of leaving.
10	"The Age of Dangos over Flowers"; Transliteration: "Hana Yori Dango no Otoshigoro" (Japanese: 花より団子のお年頃)	March 9, 2008
Spring has sprung and the Minami sisters are sitting around the kotatsu talking. Chiaki confuses 'skirt steak' (harami) with 'flower viewing' (hanami) and is teased by Kana. To save Chiaki, Haruka suggests going flower viewing, though it is still too early.
11	"As Expected, It's Getting Bad"; Transliteration: "Sasuga ni Yabaku Natte Kimashita" (Japanese: さすがにヤバくなってきました)	March 16, 2008
Touma's secret is almost revealed to Fujioka when he sees her in a girls' uniform. Kana covers for her by making Fujioka believe that everyone must crossdress at her place and tries to force Fujioka to comply. Kana feigns a cold on Saturday to avoid doing the city cleanup; Chiaki stays to keep an eye on Kana and figures out she was faking. The next day, she truly catches a cold and tries to avoid being found out, all the while recruiting Uchida and Mako-chan for help. Kana decides to get along with Fujioka, and seeks Chiaki's advice on how to do it; she tells her to do a certain move if things go bad. At school Kana asks Fujioka why he calls Chiaki and Haruka by their first names, and tells him to call her Kana-chan. Slightly shocked, Fujioka says he's too shy. Thinking that she has angered him, she uses the move Chiaki told her, and tries to do a german suplex, but she can't even move him. Instead it looks like she is hugging him, which Fujioka likes.
12	"Even One Bite More Is Painful"; Transliteration: "Mō Hitokuchi ga Tsurai no desu" (Japanese: もう一口が辛いのです)	March 23, 2008
Chiaki helps to prepare for a school sports meet. Meanwhile, the sisters learn that Fuyuki is moving and is forced to leave in the middle of the sports meet. Kana learns that Haruka has been selected to study abroad.
13	"Everyone At Once, 'Thank You for the Meal'"; Transliteration: "Minna Sorotte, Gochisōsama" (Japanese: みんな揃って、ごちそうさま)	March 30, 2008
Frightened of the prospect of Haruka studying abroad, Kana and Chiaki decide to step up to the plate and exert more of an effort with the cooking and cleaning as well as the other domestic chores in order to put Haruka's mind at ease after sending her off with a smile. It quickly becomes evident that the prospect of having to actually take care of themselves in Haruka's absence is much more than Kana and Chiaki can endure. While being tearfully embraced and exhorted to stay with them, Haruka explains to Kana and Chiaki that she has no intention of studying abroad anyway. Hosaka, who thinks that Haruka is going abroad, takes an airplane to San Francisco.

==== Theme songs ====
Opening theme

- "Kokoro no Tsubasa" (ココロノツバサ)
  - Performed by: Rina Satō, Marina Inoue, and Minori Chihara

Ending theme

- "Sono Koe ga Kikitakute" (その声が聴きたくて)
  - Performed by: Rina Satō, Marina Inoue, and Minori Chihara

=== Minami-ke: Okaeri (2009) ===
No.	Title	Original release date
1	"Start of the Year"; Transliteration: "Toshi no Hajime no" (Japanese: 年の初めの)	January 4, 2009
A euphoric moment of Haruka securing Chiaki's kimono gives way to frustration that Kana is oversleeping along with the consequent compensatory frenzy thereof that does not seem to bother Uchida who (at the cost of her micro-economy) has been enjoying herself at the festival. The fortune that Uchida purchases with Kana's money only amplifies this fact; unfortunately, Uchida takes the fortune too seriously and overlooks that realizing a fortune takes effort on her part. The next arc features Chiaki contrasting fried noodles and their instant-cup brethern with Touma who has no idea what Chiaki is telling her until Haruka returns home with Kana and prepares some tea that Takeru enjoys using old leaves rather than the ones from the first harvest. The arc that follows thereafter details the home visit the school nurse regarding Chiaki who is none too thrilled with the prospect and that Haruka refuses to intercede as Chiaki's guardian. Between Takeru's obliviousness and the school nurse's flirting along with Kana watching the whole thing, poor Chiaki is absolutely mortified. The final arc details Takeru availing a superstition of Takeru's pen pointing to one's desire to find, that points to Kana pulling her usual pranks and a fact that has been demonstrated all throughout. Kana tries it to find her "potential husband" with the pen standing still, she flicks it pointing to the door with doorbell ringing after. turns out it's Fujioka who went out to buy their milk. Fujioka forgotten which floor they are and ended up in the roof. seems the pen was pointing to Fujioka, which everyone noticed but Kana.
2	"Me Too"; Transliteration: "Ore mo" (Japanese: オレも)	January 11, 2009
Touma pays the Minami sisters a visit with an unknown payload whose revelation Chiaki objects in Haruka's absence. Though she inhibits herself for the time being, Kana begins to succumb to avarice when Fujioka comes for a visit. What follows is an exercise in game theory in which Kana leads Chiaki through an enigmatic scenario to obfuscate her volition for having the entire payload to herself since Haruka's estimated arrival time is an unknown variable. Kana's only mistake is that she forgets to consider all the players. The next arc features Haruka and Chiaki being rather vague and indirect about the supermarket and the route thereof as well as a neighborhood dog giving way to Chiaki encountering a shopping list that she suspects that Kana tampered with. The arc thereafter details Hayami comparing notes with Maki regarding Hosaka before she gets the idea to wield Hosaka's computations as her plaything. Hosaka tries befriending Maki and Atsuko but is puzzled when they swiftly flee. The final arc features Haruka taking notes from a cooking show about the preparation of curry while detecting the necessity of visiting the supermarket. Chiaki taking on this stewardship with the very notes that Haruka was taking earlier ends up inspiring Hosaka and herself an extra spicy curry.
3	"Even In A Quarrel"; Transliteration: "Kenka demo" (Japanese: ケンカでも)	January 18, 2009
Touma's ecstasy during the homebound commute is quickly extinguished by Natsuki helping himself to the snack consecrated for that purpose. Thereafter, Touma's sudden arrival on Chiaki's doorstep gives way to the revelation that Touma has an ongoing passive-aggressive dynamic with her brothers and paints a dysphoric snapshot of Touma's family. The next arc details how the Minami sisters deal with an abundance of apples. The arc concludes with the Minami brothers prosecuting protracted and complex computations regarding the utilization of the apple Touma brought back with her. The arc that follows thereafter details Haruka conferring culinary counsel upon Natsuki while Kana and Chiaki discuss Haruka and Natsuki first as individuals and then as a romantic couple. Chiaki dismisses the prospect before directing Kana to finish the curry Haruka is making. Unfortunately, the culinary protocols for both Haruka's curry and Natsuki's cookies get interchanged with dysphoric consequences. The final arc is related to the first and details the conflagration of Touma confronting Natsuki who repels his brothers' attempts to come to their sister's aid. In an attempt to guide her through guarding against this kind of misunderstanding, Kana demonstrates to Touma a form of Japanese script that looks a lot like arithmetic.
4	"There Should Be an Order"; Transliteration: "Arubeki chitsujo ga" (Japanese: あるべき秩序が)	January 25, 2009
In spite of being the reason for Touma's earlier "Hands off!!!" repulsion, Kana decides that Touma is getting out of hand while making the same mistake with Chiaki at dinner. Haruka swiftly answers the dominance question between Kana and Chiaki right before Touma arrives again with a slideshow of her family government. Kana gives Touma a photograph to show Natsuki that causes a computation crash. The next arc depicts the Minami brothers discussing what to give Touma for her birthday and revealing that Hitomi is the second-generation Banchou Natsuki cannot lay a finger on because she is a girl.
5	"It's Getting Fun"; Transliteration: "Tanoshiku naru" (Japanese: 楽しくなる)	February 1, 2009
Chiaki is down in the dumps at the upcoming stewardship of the pool and decides to enliven things by challenging everybody to a game of tag with the "it" person having the garden hose. Makoto stealing the hose and Chiaki's retaliation sparks a three-way water fight with Uchida and Yoshino that obfuscates the issue of Chiaki not being able to swim and that the compensatory computation thereof backfiring on Chiaki. The next arc is a snapshot of Kana's computations of the intermediate school social ambiance in terms of an outing to a public pool followed by the computation crash wrought upon Fujioka regarding appropriate male contact with females and the aftermath thereof. Touma demonstrates her perspective on the issue only to find that male-to-male contact is much more straightforward and has greater latitude.
6	"Let It Be"; Transliteration: "Nagashite hoshii" (Japanese: 流してほしい)	February 8, 2009
A euphoric beach outing having the dysphoric prologue of Kana being carsick is reflected upon warmly by Uchida and Yoshino who have taken the whole experience in stride. Yoshino remarks that Chiaki has become attached to Fujioka as an elder sibling in much the same way that Kana has with Uchida and her. Chiaki's exhortation for the whereabouts of her teddy bear disrupts the reminiscence; fortunately, Fujioka brings it back and Kana successfully obfuscates her role. Maki tempers her disdain for her summer homework by successfully wielding Fujioka's computations as her plaything until Kana and Chiaki extinguish her machinations. The next arc features Uchida having a near-complete computation crash as she struggles to complete her summer homework without Chiaki's counsel as the penance for abusing Chiaki's goodwill. Fortunately, Chiaki is not heartless; she eventually relents after seeing Uchida and Makoto's demonstration of interdependence being a two-way street. The final arc features Kana's attempts to forestall the approaching autumn backfiring upon her as Chiaki, galvanized by all the pranks Kana played on her, retaliates by eating Kana's dinner in addition to her own.
7	"If You Are Fine With Me"; Transliteration: "Ore de yokereba" (Japanese: オレでよければ)	February 15, 2009
Frustrated and bored with the practice for the three-legged race, Chiaki decides to call it a day much to Makoto's dismay. Kana tells Makoto of Chiaki's dearth of sports proficiency and warns that helping Chiaki will jeopardize his transvestite mirage. It becomes obvious that Makoto and Chiaki have not learned to synchronize with each other and that Makoto's transvestite mirage is quite the Damocles sword for Kana to maintain as is demonstrated when a mishap with soda leads to Kana and Chiaki sparring with parables that teach a physical metamorphosis is not a prerequisite for a euphoric relationship. Chiaki accidentally breaking the Minami sisters' mugs sets the stage for a labyrinth of complex and unnecessary strategic game theory computations that conclude to Kana's detriment.
8	"That's a Violation"; Transliteration: "Hō desu yo" (Japanese: 法ですよ)	February 22, 2009
During the homebound commute, Uchida and Yoshino's stopover to buy some baked yams during the homebound commute gives way to Kana explaining to them her "Laws of Popularity". Availing a bunch of soda cans, Kana directs Uchida and Yoshino through an exercise with soda cans to practice the Law of Weakness Appeal. Unfortunately, Chiaki (especially after the soda geyser) is not amused at the exhibition and Atsuko is put on the hot seat after Haruka takes Maki away. Touma imparting an emphatic "Watch where you are going!!!" punch to a contrite Makoto before walking away ultimately demonstrates that male-female interaction is as a kaleidoscope and that there are a myriad of variables in play. While Kana spends the next arc fishing for iconoclastic responses, Atsuko shares her "cool when silent" perspective of Hosaka before later comparing notes with Maki leads into a comical social sequence in which Hayami and the approaching Hosaka along with Maki and Atsuko seem to have completed these cerebral computations without verifying the results with the outside world.
9	"I see" Transliteration: "Sō ka" (Japanese: そうか)	March 1, 2009
During a lazy afternoon, Kana decides to help herself to some oranges while Touma and Chiaki read at the kotatsu before getting the idea to snack on an orange. It is not long before Makoto and Uchida learn the root cause: Kana delivering a preemptory "Hands off my oranges; go get your own!!!" karate chop to both Chiaki and Touma. Another arc has everybody galvanized by the Yuletime ambiance: Chiaki synthesizing a huge stocking and leaving it to chance what present she receives, Touma learning to appreciate "useless/annoying" family rituals, and Hosaka acquiring a part-time job as a cake salesman dressed in a Santa Claus suit even though he does not encounter Haruka by that avenue as per his daydream. Haruka hosts a Yuletime banquet at her house.
10	"About Attitude"; Transliteration: "Taido ni wa" (Japanese: 態度には)	March 8, 2009
Caught up in a sudden rainstorm, Touma is forced to make an emergency stopover at Chiaki's house but finds that the hospitality comes with a price: Chiaki refusing to lend Touma any clothes due to her abrasive conduct. Though she initially misinterprets Natsuki's counsel on her conduct, Touma finally catches the lesson -- and a set of clean clothes. The next arc features Chiaki's lack of discretion and foresight with her affinity for trivia and facts. Fortunately, Fujioka helps Chiaki put her error in this area into perspective. The arc that follows thereafter details the prologue of the social dynamic Fujioka is involved in with both Chiaki and Touma: Chiaki mortifying Touma out of Fujioka's lap. The arc after that details that Natsuki has the same problem of abrasive conduct about which he earlier lectured Touma who enters the room and seats herself at the table. However, Natsuki's attempts to heed his brothers' counsel along with Touma's opinions of the Minami sisters sour the ambiance.
11	"A Good Image"; Transliteration: "Ii Imēji" (Japanese: いいイメージ)	March 15, 2009
Fujioka approaching Kana with a book for Chiaki and Riko computing the approach thereof gives way to another girl named Hiroko taking notes of the whole scenario from afar before conscripting Riko into an exercise to build up the courage necessary for a confession that flounders. The next arc details Kana conducting her volition of a study session at her home with Keiko and Fujioka that Riko decides to capitalize upon. The study session's academic success contrasts with the fact that Riko has not once confessed her feelings seeming content to enjoy the ambiance of proximity to Fujioka. Fujioka, Riko, and Keiko nearly have a computation crash when they go into the bathroom to find the bathtub covered in order to keep the water hot and decide to shower instead. The arc the follows thereafter details the epilogue of a recent test in which Riko, Fujioka, and Kana's test scores are close to Keiko's perfect score. The final arc begins with a conversation between Makoto and Touma over being given chocolates as a Valentine's Day joke prompting Kana deciding to play Othello after telling Chiaki that she needs to practice celebrating Valentine's Day to gain the experience.
12	"A Warm Place"; Transliteration: "Attakai tokoro" (Japanese: あったかい所)	March 22, 2009
Chiaki lashing out at Uchida, Kana, and Maki due to their boisterous laughter rousing her from a nap on a warm spring day gives way Kana first sending in Uchida and Maki to fight this battle for her before doing her own dirty work only to have it end in a stalemate. The next arc features Makoto and Uchida taking an afternoon nap with Kana when Maki pays the trio a visit with the request that Kana gaze upon her sleeping face while recalling a dysphoric middle school memory, especially after Kana reads Maki and Uchida sleeping as the perfect opportunity to draw on their faces as a prank. The arc thereafter features Haruka and Atsuko looking at pictures from their middle school days. The arc that ensues has Chiaki sewing on a wayward button while Kana detects Haruka's school uniform carelessly strewn about before remarking of the seasonal uniform transition. While modifying a shirt of Kana's, Chiaki accidentally slices Haruka's fuku skirt. Knowing that Haruka will be very angry with them when she detects the damage, Kana and Chiaki attempt some desperate and frenzied repairs to buy time for computing their next move. Unfortunately, things coming unraveled when Maki detects the telltale thread put both Kana and Chiaki in scalding hot water with Haruka. The final arc features Kana blowing up at Chiaki for insulting her once too often before deciding to resolve her fears of Chiaki becoming a delinquent by being a nice older sister. Unfortunately, all Kana accomplishes is to greatly unsettle Chiaki and frighten her into co-sleeping with Haruka.
13	"Because We're Together"; Transliteration: "Issho dakara ne" (Japanese: 一緒だからね)	March 29, 2009
While doing some homework, Chiaki observes Haruka in some kind of distress and anxiously runs to Kana for assistance. Even though she feels that the cause of Haruka's distress is something minor like what to prepare for dinner/breakfast, Kana observes Haruka with Chiaki for a while without gaining any more insight unaware that Haruka is observing their strange behavior and wondering its root cause. While Kana and Chiaki converse after school, Haruka is doing the same with Yoshino and Uchida. The misunderstanding is ultimately resolved by everybody making faces at each other. The next arc features the aftermath of a nightmare that has Chiaki clinging to Kana that Haruka euphorically takes in stride. While Haruka is out on the town with her friends, Chiaki gets over her nightmare while Kana has a similar nightmare that sends her clinging to Haruka who is late coming home. The final arc is set in motion when Kana writes her Tanabata wish to repudiate sweets that gets interpreted as a suicide note that scares both Haruka and Chiaki who think that they are to blame. Fortunately, the misunderstanding is quickly resolved and everybody has a wonderful time at the Tanabata party glad to be together.

==== Theme songs ====
Opening theme

- "Keikenchi Soku Jōjō↑↑" (経験値速上々↑↑)
  - Performed by: Rina Satō, Marina Inoue, and Minori Chihara

Ending theme

- "Zettai Colorful Sengen" (絶対カラフル宣言)
  - Performed by: Rina Satō, Marina Inoue, and Minori Chihara

=== Minami-ke: Tadaima (2013) ===
No.	Title	Original release date
1	"Spring is Here, and So Are the Minamis"; Transliteration: "Haru no Hajimari, Minami-ke no Hajimari" (Japanese: 春のはじまり、南家のはじまり)	January 6, 2013
2	"Let's Be Ourselves"; Transliteration: "Rashiku, Ikimasho" (Japanese: らしく、いきましょ)	January 13, 2013
3	"Simply Put, It's a Roundabout Confession"; Transliteration: "Tsumari wa Tōmawashi na Ai no Kokuhaku" (Japanese: つまりは遠回しな愛の告白)	January 20, 2013
4	"The Man Sweats Under the Blue Summer Sky"; Transliteration: "Kono Aoi Natsu Sora no Shita de Otoko wa Ase o Nagasu" (Japanese: この青い夏空の下で男は汗を流す)	January 27, 2013
5	"Making Chilled Noodles"; Transliteration: "Hiyashichūka Hajimemasu yo" (Japanese: 冷やし中華はじめますよ)	February 3, 2013
6	"A Girl Cannot Hide Her Sunburn, Nor Her Heart"; Transliteration: "Kakushikirenai Hiyake to Otomegokoro" (Japanese: 隠し切れない日焼けと乙女心)	February 10, 2013
7	"Coming for a Late Summer Visit"; Transliteration: "Zansho Omimai Mōshiagemasu" (Japanese: 残暑お見舞い申し上げます)	February 17, 2013
Touma regrets not being able to go to the beach and Kana tells her that a full summer consists of no regrets. She puts Touma in Chiaki's frilly swimsuit while Uchida says she would like to go on a trip. As Chiaki and enters and complains about her swimsuit, Kana and the girls plan a trip, which ends up as a regular sleepover. Since Chiaki, Kana, and Uchida cannot go to sleep, they wake up the others to tell ghost stories. Kana gets a toothache and is unable to redeem and eat her free popsicle. She gives it away only to have it come back to her. When she finds another free popsicle stick in her desk, she redeems them both and gives the popsicles to her sisters. The girls use the excuse of a mosquito to hit each other but it turns back once someone really does get bitten. Takeru treats the hungry sisters and their friends to a sushi buffet and limits them to 10,000 yen per person but Chiaki accidentally orders too much. Haruka comes home from shopping and Takeru asks her to go out to sushi as well after seeing her sad.
8	"Vegetables with Your Merry Friends on Your Day Off"; Transliteration: "Kyūjitsu wa Yukai na Nakama to Oyasai o" (Japanese: 休日はゆかいな仲間とお野菜を)	February 24, 2013
Hosaka attempts to host a barbecue for Haruka and his "daughters", Chiaki and Kana. Realizing that he can't have a barbecue with only themselves, he decides to ask his friends to join him but they all say that they won't be able to make it since they are attending another barbecue. Natsuki asks him to join them but he denies, exclaiming that there is no point in that. This barbecue happens to be hosted by the Minami family. Haruka tells Natsuki to grill the vegetables first as it will even seem delicious to a hungry Chiaki. She eats her vegetables and goes to thank Natsuki, calling him the true God of Fire. Afterwards, she sees Haruka feeding Natsuki a piece of meat and Chiaki takes back her compliment, interrupting them. It turns out Natsuki also prepared grilled potatoes and Chiaki again admires him. Chiaki and Kana talk about how their friends have been talking about a dance from a TV show that made anyone like vegetables. They tune in to watch the program and afterwards, Chiaki demands Kana to make her some vegetables. More and more people watch the show and all become brainwashed into loving vegetables. At the supermarket, Hosaka sees sausages next to the vegetables section that are free for sampling and decides to try one out. Chiaki decides to follow his example and after tasting the meat, they both return to normal and wonder why they were buying vegetables. Chiaki goes back home to see Haruka watching the same TV programming and she asks Chiaki for vegetables.
9	"Love Begins Now"; Transliteration: "Ima Koi o Hajimemasu" (Japanese: 今、恋をはじめます)	March 3, 2013
10	"We Started Living Green"; Transliteration: "Ekoraifu Hajimemashita" (Japanese: エコライフはじめました)	March 10, 2013
Haruka decides to be eco-friendly in their house because of last month's utility bill. To Kana and Chiaki's dismay, Haruka doesn't allow use of the kotatsu besides during dinner. Chiaki sees that Haruka's hands are red in an effort to save money by switching to washing dishes with cold water and decides to do her best at being eco-friendly as well. Takeru comes by and Kana persuades him to take them out to dinner. Chiaki is sick and has not come to school. Makoto and the rest of Chiaki's friends bring healing gifts to Chiaki and end up making sukiyaki with the ingredients. Mako-chan is invited to her house by Kana. It is Pajama Day in the Minami-ke residence and with Kana nowhere to be found, Mako-chan has to protect his identity by himself. He starts questioning whether it would matter or not if he was found out but changes his mind when he sees Haruka in her buttoned-down shirt. Mako-chan urges everybody to go buy sweets just as Chiaki asks him to sleep with her.
11	"The Goddess Descends on the Holy Night"; Transliteration: "Seinaru Yoru Kami wa Maioriru" (Japanese: 聖なる夜、神は舞い降りる)	March 17, 2013
12	"Start Planning Your Year from New Year's Day"; Transliteration: "Ichinen no Kei wa Gantan ni Arurashi" (Japanese: 一年の計は元旦にあるらしい)	March 24, 2013
13	"What's Said Here, Stays Here"; Transliteration: "Koko Dake no Hanashi wa Koko Dake de" (Japanese: ここだけの話はここだけで)	March 31, 2013

==== Theme songs ====
Opening theme

- "Shiawase High Tension" (シアワセ☆ハイテンション↑↑)
  - Performed by: Rina Satō, Marina Inoue, and Minori Chihara
  - Lyricist: Uran
  - Composition and arrangement by: Kaoru Ōkubo

Ending theme

- "Kyūsekkin Lucky Days" (急接近ラッキーDAYS)
  - Performed by: Rina Satō, Marina Inoue, and Minori Chihara
  - Lyricist: Uran
  - Composition by: Akirahiko Yamaguchi
  - Arrangement by: Tomoki Kikuya

== OVAs ==
=== Minami-ke: Betsubara (2009) ===
No.	Title	Original release date
1	"Minami-ke: Betsubara"; Transliteration: "Minami-ke: Betsubara" (Japanese: みなみけ べつばら)	June 23, 2009

==== Theme songs ====
Opening theme

- "Shunkashuutou Fesutibaru♪" (春夏秋冬フェスティバル♪; lit. 'Four Seasons Festival♪')
  - Performed by: Rina Satō, Marina Inoue, and Minori Chihara

Ending theme

- "Arigatou Sankyu" (ありがとうサンキュ; lit. 'Thank You Thank You')
  - Performed by: Rina Satō, Marina Inoue, and Minori Chihara

=== Minami-ke: Omatase (2012) ===
No.	Title	Original release date
1	"Minami-ke: Omatase"; Transliteration: "Minami-ke: Omatase" (Japanese: みなみけ おまたせ)	October 5, 2012

==== Theme songs ====
Opening theme

- "Shunkashuutou Fesutibaru♪" (春夏秋冬フェスティバル♪; lit. 'Four Seasons Festival♪')
  - Performed by: Rina Satō, Marina Inoue, and Minori Chihara

Ending theme

- "Arigatou Sankyu" (ありがとうサンキュ; lit. 'Thank You Thank You')
  - Performed by: Rina Satō, Marina Inoue, and Minori Chihara

=== Minami-ke: Natsuyasumi (2013) ===
No.	Title	Original release date
1	"Minami-ke: Natsuyasumi"; Transliteration: "Minami-ke: Natsuyasumi" (Japanese: みなみけ 夏やすみ)	August 6, 2013
