= Hibino =

Hibino (written: 日比野 or 日美野) may refer to:

== Surname ==
- Akari Hibino (日比野 朱里, born 1959), Japanese voice actress
- Azusa Hibino (日美野 梓, born 1990), Japanese model
- Nao Hibino (日比野 菜緒, born 1990), Japanese tennis player
- Norihiko Hibino (日比野 則彦, born 1973), Japanese composer and saxophonist
- Tetsuya Hibino (日比野 哲也, born 1974), Japanese professional drifting driver

== Other ==
- Hibino, Japanese AV production company, member of SOD Group
- Hibino Station:
  - Hibino Station (Aisai, Aichi), train station in Aisai, Aichi Prefecture, Japan
  - Hibino Station (Nagoya), train station in Nagoya City, Japan
