= Water Flower =

- Movie poster
- Directed by: Yusuke Kinoshita
- Written by: Yusuke Kinoshita
- Starring: Azusa Hibino
- Release dates: 14 July 2005 (PIA Film Festival); 5 August 2006 (Japan)
- Running time: 92 minutes
- Country: Japan
- Language: Japanese

Water Flower (水の花, Mizu no Hana) is a Japanese film which was released on 5 August 2005.

== Synopsis ==
Minako is a quiet junior high school student being raised by her overworked single father. This movie is a portrait of the relationship between Minako and Yu, Minako's younger half-sister who loves to ballet dance. Minako and her father have a very strained relationship, and she feels as if he is a stranger to her. The situation is exacerbated when he comes home drunk one night and tries to climb on top of her.

Minako's mother deserted them for another man when Minako was a child. Now working as a hostess, Minako’s mother has little time for her own six-year-old daughter, Yu, Minako's half sister. Both girls are yearning for their mother's love. Minako runs into Yu at a game center in the mall and proposes they take a trip. She changes out of her school uniform and into adult clothes and the pair hops on an overnight bus out of the city. It gets dark and both parents start to panic.

On a whim, Minako takes Yu to the remote house of their grandparents (who have recently died) near the sea. As she spends time taking care and playing with her little sister, Minako takes on the role of a mother, playing and looking after her little half-sister. She becomes aware of her own situation. As she plays, her mind drifts back to memories of her own, happy childhood. Although now at an age where she feels more distanced from her father, the resentment she bears her mother for having deserted her and her father, remains unbroken.

== Cast ==
- Azusa Hibino - Yuriko
- Asuka Kurosawa - Shiori Nagahara
- Tomi Nakaho - Yumiko Sasaki
- Himawari Ono - Yu Nagahara
- Minami Orimoto - Tomoko
- Tetsushi Tanaka - Keisuke Takatsuki
- Saki Terashima - Minako Takatsuki
- Takehito Terui - Ryota Sasaki
- Kanji Tsuda - Takashi Nagahara
- Saeka Uehara - Kaoru
- Nozomi Yasuda - Maki

== Home media ==
The DVD for this movie was released on 24 March 2007 by Kinokuniya Bookstore (Japan).
