= Sotsugyō =

"Sotsugyō" (卒業), a Japanese word meaning "graduation", may refer to:

- "Sotsugyō", a 1976 song by Megumi Asaoka
- "Sotsugyō" (Yuki Saito song), 1985
- "Sotsugyō" (Zone song), 2004
- "Sotsugyō (Mata, Aō ne)", a 2008 song by Hatsune Okumura
- "Sotsugyō", a 2006 song by Miliyah Kato
- "Sotsugyō (Graduation)", a 1985 song by Momoko Kikuchi
- Sotsugyō, a 1990 film directed by Akio Yoshida and Hirotaka Kato
- Sotsugyō, a 2002 film directed by Masahiko Nagasawa
