= Garo Aida =

Japanese photographer (born 1949)

- Born: November 4, 1949 (age 77); Japan
- Known for: photography
- Movement: Nude photography

Garo Aida (会田 我路, Aida Garo; born November 4, 1949) is a Japanese photographer known widely for his erotic work. He has also worked in advertising, contributing his photographs to various Japanese companies' commercial ads, such as those by Fujitsu and Nippon Oil.

== Biography ==
Excerpts from Aida's books Romansu, Romansu Part 2, and Hi ga gensou jipangu ~ Ten no maki, showing nude adult women, were featured in the November 1983 issue of the French photography magazine Photo Reporter, including on the cover. The June 1986 issue of the French edition of Photo magazine, which had a special focus on Japan, contained a cover photo by Aida showing three young nude Japanese women. His photos were also published during the 1980s in the Italian, German, and Spanish editions of Photo and in France's Newlook magazine, among others.

During the 1990s, Aida made erotic photographs of teenage models both over and under 18 years of age. Among his best known models from this period are Kaoru from Japan and many of his subjects from Sweden. These photographs are generally regarded as tasteful and high in quality. Many of them show partial or full nudity.

Aida photographed Naomi Morinaga, an actress in 1984's Uchuu Keiji Shaider, for a 1994 book titled W Face.

In the 2000s (decade), he photographed milder erotic pictures of very young models — something quite acceptable in Japan, but not viewed favorably in the west. These later works are not nude photographs, but images of models in swim wear, casual clothing, and school uniforms. The models range in age from 10 to 17. One of his most famous models is Saaya Irie, who debuted at the age of 11 and whom Aida photographed in seductive poses that emphasized her well developed breasts and highlighted her mature physical development. There is a comfortable attitude toward lolita among Japanese men, making these photos high-selling items in both regular and e-book formats.

Aida has also released several videos and DVDs of both nude and non-nude subjects (many are the same models who posed for his still photography).

He is known for his work with Japanese idol Mao Kobayashi. She has appeared from the age of 12 in several photo books and DVDs, wearing very revealing outfits and posing sensually. She has a website and has made several television appearances. Aida has photographed Mao in kimono, school uniform, swim wear, and other costumes.

Other popular models under 15 Aida has photographed include Asami Doi (13), Sari Kiri (13), Azusa Hibino (14), and Yuka Yamaguchi (14).

== Selected books by Garo Aida ==
- Shōjo. Japan: Toen Mook, 1981
- Romansu. Tokyo, Japan: Take Shobo, 1981
- Romansu Part 2. Tokyo, Japan: Take Shobo, 1982
- Hi ga gensou jipangu ~ Ten no maki. Japan: Bamboo Mook, 1982
- W Face. Tokyo, Japan: Wanibooks, 1994 - ISBN 4-8470-2362-5
- Sweden Sex-Ton. Tokyo, Japan: Kaiohsha, 1994 - ISBN 4-87724-027-6
- Sweden Sex-Ton 2. Tokyo, Japan: Kaiohsha, 1995 - ISBN 4-87724-031-4
- Imouto. Tokyo, Japan: Kaiohsha, 1998 - ISBN 4-87724-076-4
- The Photography of Alice in Wonderland. Japan: Bauhaus, 1999
- Kaoru Seventeen. Tokyo, Japan: Bunkasha, 1999 - ISBN 4-8211-2271-5
- Kaoru 2. Tokyo, Japan: Bunkasha, 2000 - ISBN 4-8211-2315-0
- Sotsugyou Sashin - Kaoru Private Collection. Tokyo, Japan: Bunkasha, 2002 - ISBN 4-8211-2451-3
- The European Fairy Tale. Tokyo, Japan: Bunkasha, 2003 - ISBN 4-8211-2514-5
- Saaya 11 sai. Tokyo, Japan: Bunkasha, 2005 - ISBN 4-8211-2660-5
- Mao 13 sai ~Houjun~. Tokyo, Japan: Bunkasha, 2006 - ISBN 4-8211-2679-6
- Mao 14 sai ~Oto~. Tokyo, Japan: Bunkasha, 2006 - ISBN 4-8211-2683-4

== Magazine pictorials by Garo Aida ==
- Photo (French edition), March 1983 (#186) - 12 pages, "En photos les estampes japonaises"
- Photo Hi Fi Italiana, May 1983 (#95) - "Le stampe giapponesi in fotografia"
- Photo Reporter, November 1983 (#61)
- Newlook, March 1984 (#7) - "Femmes tatouées"
