= Miyu Nagase =

- Born: May 20, 1988 (age 38)
- Origin: Sapporo, Hokkaido, Japan
- Genres: Pop, rock
- Occupations: Singer, musician
- Years active: 1997—present
- Labels: SME Records (1999—2005); CAM Entertainment (2007—)

Miyu Nagase (長瀬 実夕, Nagase Miyu; born May 20, 1988, in Hokkaido) is a Japanese singer, guitarist and a former member of all-female pop rock band Zone, which disbanded in 2005.

== Biography ==
As a young child, Nagase loved to sing. By third grade, she decided to take her singing abilities seriously and enrolled at Studio RunTime, a children's school for the performing arts. In 1998, she was selected as one of the final four members to be in the pop band Zone.

Nagase released two solo singles in December 2004: "Just 4 your Luv" (December 1, 2004) and "Snowy Love" (December 15, 2004). On February 23, 2005, she released "Luv & Love Clips from N.Y.", which showed her recording "Just 4 Your Luv" and "Snowy Love" in New York.

Zone disbanded on April 1, 2005.

In August 2006, Nagase released a single with the Nagisa no All Stars, "Taiyo no Take Off / Kimi wa Boku no Aozora".

On October 10, 2007, Nagase released a fourth single, "Key: Yume Kara Samete". This was her first release under the new label CAM Entertainment. On November 21, 2007, she released her first solo album, Gateway to Tomorrow.

On February 13, 2008, she released her fifth single, "Rose".

On May 21, 2008, she released her sixth single, "Akane". This was one of the theme songs for the drama Mama no Kamisama.

== Discography ==
For releases as a member of Zone, see Zone.

=== Singles ===
==== Sony records ====
- "Just 4 your Luv" (2004.12.1)
- "Snowy Love" (2004.12.15)

==== CAM Entertainment ====
- "Key: Yume Kara Samete" (Key~夢から覚めて~) (2007.10.10)
- "Rose" (2008.02.13)
- "Akane" (茜) (2008.5.21)

=== Albums ===
- Gateway to Tomorrow (2007.11.21)

=== DVDs ===
- Luv & Love Clips from N.Y. (2005.2.23)
- Taiyo no Take Off / Kimi wa Boku no Aozora (太陽のテイクオフ/君はボクの青空) (2006.08) (with Nagisa no All Stars)
