= God's Left Hand, Devil's Right Hand =

2006 film by Shūsuke Kaneko

- Directed by: Shūsuke Kaneko
- Written by: Yoshinori Matsugae
- Based on: Kami no Hidarite, Akuma no Migite by Kazuo Umezu
- Produced by: Yoshio Sakai; Ikuo Suo
- Starring: Asuka Shibuya; Ai Maeda; Saaya Irie; Reon Kadena
- Cinematography: Kanji Takama
- Edited by: Yousuke Yafune
- Music by: Wataru Hokoyama
- Distributed by: Toshiba Entertainment
- Release date: July 14, 2006
- Running time: 94 minutes
- Country: Japan
- Language: Japanese

God's Left Hand, Devil's Right Hand (神の左手 悪魔の右手, Kami no Hidarite, Akuma no Migite) is a 2006 Japanese horror film directed by Shūsuke Kaneko, based upon Kazuo Umezu's ultra-violent/horror manga Kami no Hidarite, Akuma no Migite. The film released on July 14, 2006, at the Fantasia Film Festival. It stars Asuka Shibuya, Ai Maeda, Saaya Irie and Reon Kadena.

== Synopsis ==
So (Tsubasa Kobayashi) is a six-year-old boy capable of seeing horrific images of other people's evil acts. This ability ends up putting him in a coma after one episode leaves him with huge bloody wounds. Sou is able to communicate with his sister Izumi (Asuka Shibuya) through a broken cell phone and he pleads with her to find the killer, as he knows that the person won't stop on their own.

== Cast ==
- Asuka Shibuya as Izumi Yamabe
- Tsubasa Kobayashi as So Yamabe
- Ai Maeda as Yoshiko Tani
- Momoko Shimizu as Momo
- Saaya as Ayu
