= Momoko Shimizu =

Japanese actress

- 清水 萌々子
- Born: October 9, 1997 (age 28); Tokyo, Japan
- Occupation: Actress
- Years active: 2002–2007

Momoko Shimizu (清水 萌々子, Shimizu Momoko; born 9 October 1997) is a Japanese former child actress who was affiliated with Horipro. She is best known for her role as Yuki Fukushima in the 2004 film Nobody Knows.

== Selected filmography ==
- Nobody Knows (2004)
- Train Man (2005)
- God's Left Hand, Devil's Right Hand (2006)
