= Azusa Hibino =

Japanese model

- Born: Azusa Hibino; July 26, 1990 (age 35); Tokyo, Japan
- Other name: 日比野梓
- Modeling information
- Height: 1.54 m (5 ft 1 in)

Azusa Hibino (日美野梓, Hibino Azusa; born July 26, 1990) is a Japanese model. Photographed by Garo Aida, she commonly poses in magazines with Mao Kobayashi, as well as other models.

== Career ==
Hibino graduated from the Nihon Newart High School and Japan Newart College.

From 2002 to 2008, she was affiliated with talent agency Office Fukue, appearing in many DVDs and photo collections photographed by Garo Aida.

Since April 2011, she has been affiliated with the Shiki Theatre Company, performing under the name Marie Wakana. Her special skill is tap dancing.

== Works ==
=== Television ===
- 15-0 (Fifteen Love) (2003–2004, BS Asahi)
- Pajama Ranger (2004–2005, CS Nippon)
- Bishoujo Tropical! (2006, EX Entertainment)

=== Movies ===
- Mizu no Hana (2005, Pia Euro Space) – Role: Yuriko

=== V-Cinema ===
- Sei Shoujo Senshi St. Valkyrie (2006, Taki Corporation)

=== Photo collections ===
- 《Sunshine Girl age 12》
- 《美少女予报 age 13》写真集系列（7部）
- 《制服日和 age 13》写真集系列（7部）
- 《清纯いもうと倶楽部 age 13》写真集系列（4部）
- 《清纯いもうと倶楽部 age 14》写真集系列（9部）
- 《age 15 写真集》

== See also ==
- Mao Kobayashi (Japanese idol)
- Saaya Irie
- Haruka Suenaga
