= Sweet Kiss (band) =

Japanese pop band

Sweet Kiss was a Japanese pop band made up of Saaya Irie, Runa Okada, and Jessica. They have debuted only releasing a couple of songs.

The band rumored its breakup on May 12, 2006. Two of the members, Irie and Okada, went on to form a new trio, named "Chase," with Rio Iguchi. Furthermore, all Chase members starred together in a number of Japanese horror movies. These include Carved: The Slit-Mouthed Woman and Shoujo Rei (Girl Ghost).

== Music ==
As Sweet Kiss, in addition to all Sweet Kiss members performing a special audio track in the anime DVD set Class 5-2, Sweet Kiss also released a number of songs for the anime. Note, in the special edition Saaya voiced the role of Chika!

- Baby Love
- Yakusoku

== Movies ==
- Shoujo Rei
- Slit Mouthed Woman

== Photobooks ==
In 2005 the photographer Garo Aida released three photobooks which featured the girls as junior idols in suggestive poses and wearing revealing swimwear. These releases reflected a widespread mid-2000s industry trend in Japan, when mainstream publishers and talent agencies routinely marketed pre-teen 'junior idols' in commercial photobooks.

- Saaya Age 11 (紗綾11歳 写真集), 2005 - Tokyo: Bunkasha - ISBN 4-8211-2660-5
- Runa Age 12 (留奈12歳 写真集), 2005 - Tokyo: Bunkasha - ISBN 4-8211-2662-1
- Jessica Age 11: Jessica Photobook (ジェシカ11歳 写真集), 2005 - Tokyo: Bunkasha - ISBN 4-8211-2665-6

Especially Saaya Irie's photobook gained popularity because of her very developed breasts for a girl her age.

== Anime ==
- Kyō no Go no Ni

== Tributes ==
- While neither Sweet Kiss nor Chase has put out a lot of music, the music they did release inspired a string of acoustic tributes.
- Yakusoku piano tribute
- Babylove piano tribute
