= Kyō no Go no Ni =

Work

- Cover to Kyō no Go no Ni tankōbon

今日の5の2
- Manga
- Written by: Koharu Sakuraba
- Published by: Kodansha
- Magazine: Bessatsu Young Magazine
- Original run: 2002 – 2003
- Volumes: 1
- Original video animation
- Directed by: Makoto Sokuza
- Produced by: Hiroaki Fujishima; Yuuichirou Takahata (1–2); Shunji Sakai (1–2); Yuusuke Kouno (3–4); Mihihiko Hirata (3–4)
- Written by: Okimitsuki (1–2, 4); Makoto Sokuza (3)
- Music by: Tooru Yukawa
- Studio: Shinkuukan (1–2); Lyrics (3–4)
- Released: March 24, 2006 – March 21, 2007
- Runtime: 27–29 minutes
- Episodes: 4 + 1 Special
- Anime television series
- Directed by: Tsuyoshi Nagasawa
- Produced by: Gou Nakanishi
- Written by: Takamitsu Kouno
- Music by: Kei Haneoka
- Studio: Xebec
- Original network: TV Tokyo
- Original run: October 5, 2008 – December 28, 2008
- Episodes: 13 + OVA

Kyō no Go no Ni (今日の5の2, Kyō no Go no Ni; "Today, in Class 5-2") is a Japanese seinen manga series created by Koharu Sakuraba, the author of Minami-ke. It was originally serialized in Kodansha's Bessatsu Young Magazine from 2002 to 2003, and the twenty-two chapters were later collected together in a single tankōbon volume along with two extra chapters and published on November 11, 2003, by Kodansha. The main premise of Kyō no Go no Ni is the school life of the fifth year class 5-2 (age 11–12), focusing on an elementary-school boy named Ryōta Satō.

In 2006, Shinkūkan produced a four-episode original video adaptation (OVA) directed by Makoto Sokuza. The OVAs contain a special audio track in which the female characters' voices are replaced by members of the idol unit Sweet Kiss and were released in two versions: original and special edit. Xebec produced a thirteen episode anime adaptation directed by Tsuyoshi Nagasawa, unrelated to the OVAs. It first began airing on TV Tokyo between October 5, 2008, and December 28, 2008. an OVA version of the anime was released in 2009, directed by Tsuyoshi Nagasawa, featuring the same cast as the anime.

== Plot ==
Ever since their childhood, Ryōta Satō and Chika Koizumi have been close friends, going so far as to pinky swear to marry each other. The story begins when they are both now in their fifth year of elementary school in class 5-2 together with their group of friends Yūki Asano, Kazumi Aihara, Natsumi Hirakawa, Megumi Hidaka, Kōji Imai, Tsubasa Kawai. While making his way to sixth year, much to his own dismay, Ryōta is often forced unwillingly into compromising situations.

== Characters ==
Ryōta Satō (佐藤リョータ, Satō Ryōta)
Voiced by: Hōko Kuwashima (OVA) Yū Kobayashi (Anime)
Ryōta is the protagonist of the series and the childhood friend of Chika, having a crush on her ever since. In the past the two often played together, even sleeping together in the same bed, and promised to marry each other once they had grown into adults. He is best friends with Kōji and good friends with Tsubasa Kawai and often challenges Kōji to see which of the two is better. He enjoys eating and playing games together with the rest of the class. Although he is not very intelligent, he is a kind person and tries to help others when he can, which often unwilling and unintentionally trap him in comprising situations that earn him a beating from either Chika or Yūki. He is naive to the desires of normal males as he is not especially interested in relationships between males and females. Once he falls asleep, not only is it extremely hard to waken him once more, but for anyone who comes into close proximity to him, he will grab them and do something strange to them before they too fall asleep. Not only that, he is also a bad sleeper as he frequently rolls around in his sleep. His seat number is 12.
Chika Koizumi (小泉チカ, Koizumi Chika)
Voiced by: Mai Kadowaki and Saaya Irie (OVA) Asami Shimoda (Anime)
Chika is the childhood friend of Ryōta and in their romantic relationship with each other, she often takes the lead role. She has a crush on him and despite her best attempts, she is unable to get Ryōta to notice. She is fond of her childhood memories that she shares with Ryōta and in the end, she up take his hand. She is usually level-headed but not always, physically abusing Ryōta should he "deserve" it (decided by her jumping to conclusions). She also has a mischievous spirit, unafraid to play pranks on Ryōta, no matter what position they leave him in. Her number on the class list is 10.
Yūki Asano (浅野ユウキ, Asano Yūki)
Voiced by: Mikako Takahashi and Jessica (OVA) Satomi Akesaka (Anime)
She is bright, talkative, and active. She enjoys chatting, gossiping, and talking about things such as fashion and frequently worries about the size of her breasts. Though despite having a strong sense of responsibility, she is known for being unable to keep secrets. She has a crush on Kōji and gives him chocolates for Valentine's Day. She is a terrible cook. Her number on the class list is 2.
Kazumi Aihara (相原カズミ, Aihara Kazumi)
Voiced by: Mamiko Noto and Runa (OVA) MAKO (Anime)
She is quiet, mysterious, and sadistic. She is often seen taking notes down in her observational diary on whatever happens to interest her at the time rather than participating in physical activities along with everyone else. However, no one, not even Chika whom she has been friends with for a long time, has ever seen her laugh. Like Ryouta, she is a member of the health committee. Her number on the class list is 1.
Natsumi Hirakawa (平川ナツミ, Hirakawa Natsumi)
Voiced by: Maria Yamamoto (OVA) Kana Asumi (Anime)
She is a short, sporty and athletic girl who can beat anyone at sports. Although she generally does not have desires, when she finds a goal, she is able to single-mindely pursue it. Although she is generally a calm person, she is nyctophobic. She is very innocent, often being stopped by her friends from undressing in public in front of boys. She is a tomboy and refers to herself in a very masculine way as she uses the male-singular pronoun "boku" (僕) to refer to herself and always dresses in boys clothing except during the epilogue of the anime. Her number on the class list is 17.
Megumi Hidaka (日高メグミ, Hidaka Megumi)
Voiced by: Kana Ueda (OVA) Youko Honda (Anime)
Megumi wears glasses and is nearly blind without them. Surprisingly, she is a rather carless person and is often fooled by her surroundings. She is more developed then the other girls in her class and is self-conscious when others notice that. She often worries about her weight, ensuring that it stays at exactly 35 kg. Her number on the class list is 16.
Kōji Imai (今井コウジ, Imai Kōji)
Voiced by: Yū Asakawa (OVA) Megumi Yamato (Anime)
Kōji is Ryōta's best friend. He is bold and quick witted as well as being knowledgeable as to what girls expect from guys and in his childhood, he was a habitual skirt flipper. He has black hair in the TV version and blond in the OVA. He often challenges Ryōta to several duels to see which of the two is better. He is afraid of Yuki cooking. His number on the class list is 3.
Tsubasa Kawai (河合ツバサ, Kawai Tsubasa)
Voiced by: Minori Chihara (OVA) Ayahi Takagaki (Anime)
Tsubasa is one of Ryōta's close friends. He is very calm and kind, always carrying an innocent smile and often playing the role of mediator between Ryōta and Kōji. He is intelligent and loves reading about and viewing outer space. He has blond hair in the TV version and black in the OVA. His number on the class list is 8.

== Media ==
=== Manga ===
The original work for Kyō no Go no Ni is illustrated and written by Koharu Sakuraba. It was serialized in Kodansha's Bessatsu Young Magazine between 2002 and 2003. The only tankōbon volume of the series was published on November 11, 2003. The volume features Chika as the cover character in addition to two omake chapters entitled Supplementary Lesson - "Today in Tennis Club" and Invitation. In a similarly named magazine the Weekly Young Magazine, it was announced in its 43rd issue on September 22, 2008, that it would begin serializing Kyō no Go no Ni once again in its next issue on September 29, 2008.

== Chapter List ==
- 001. "Wiggle, Wiggle" (グラグラ)
- 002. "Collarbones" (サコツ)
- 003. "Undefeated" (マケナシ)
- 004. "The Scale" (メモリ)
- 005. "Sneak Attack" (ダマシウチ)
- 006. "Smile" (エガオ)
- 007. "Dress-Up" (キセカエ)
- 008. "Observation Diary" (カンサツニッキ)
- 009. "Rain" (アメフリ)
- 010. "Superball" (スーパーボール)
- 011. "Library" (トショシツ)
- 012. "Fairytale" (メルヘン)
- 013. "Surprise" (ヌキウチ)
- 014. "Sweet and Soft" (アマアマ)
- 015. "Flip" (メクリ)
- 016. "Cat's Paw" (ネコノテ)
- 017. "Nodding Off" (ウトウト)
- 018. "Bum Rap" (ヌレギヌ)
- 019. "Comparing Heights" (セクラベ)
- 020. "Three-Legged Race" (サンキャク)
- 021. "Pinky Promise Part 1" (ユビキリ（前編）)
- 022. "Pinky Promise Part 2" (ユビキリ（後編）)
- "Today in Tennis Club" (今日のテニス部)
- "Turn on the Water"

=== OVAs ===
Kyō no Go no Ni was adapted into an OVA by Shinkūkan in 2006, directed by Makoto Sokuza and written by Miki Okitsu. The music for the OVA was composed by Toru Yukawa. A sixty-six second trailer was announced on February 20, 2006. A special audio track was included in the DVDs in which the female characters' voices are replaced by members of the idol unit Sweet Kiss; Chika's voice actor (Mai Kadowaki) is replaced by Saaya Irie; Yūki's voice actor (Mikako Takahashi) is replaced by Jessica; Kazumi Aihara's voice actor (Noto Mamiko) is replaced by Runa. It featured three theme songs, one opening and two endings that were all sung by Mai Kadowaki, Mamiko Noto, and Mikako Takahashi. "Baby Love" is used as the opening for all the episodes. "Yakusoku" (約束) is used as the first ending theme for the first two episodes. "Sakura Iro Kaze" (桜色風) is used as the second ending theme for the last two episodes. It adapts all the chapters of the manga except for 9th Period - "Rain", 12th Period - "Fairytale", 17th Period - "Nodding Off", and Supplementary Lesson - "Today in Tennis Club". However, it includes an arc not included in the manga in its second episode entitled "5th Period 'Invitation'". The OVAs span four episodes, released in four different DVDs entitled "1-3 Trimesters" (1-3学期) and "Spring Break" (春休み) were released from March 24, 2006, to and March 21, 2007. Each DVD also has a special edit version that comes with an extra item or two. The DVD boxset was released on January 30, 2008. It included all four of the OVA adaptation's DVDs, an additional DVD entitled "Extracurricular Lesson" (課外授業) that included the extra chapter as well as an interview with the staff, and an additional CD which included: all three of the theme songs, all the tracks on the radio drama included with the special edit of the third OVA DVD volume, and a special wallpaper for a computer.

A second OVA adaptation of Kyō no Go no Ni, directed by Tsuyoshi Nagasawa and written by Takamitsu Kouno, featuring the same cast as the anime adaptation by Xebec was released in October 2009. The music was composed by Kei Haneoka.

=== Anime ===
Kyō no Go no Ni was adapted into an anime by Xebec, directed by Tsuyoshi Nagasawa, written by Takamitsu Kouno, and produced by Starchild Records. The music for the anime was composed by Takamitsu Kouno. The major and staff and leading voice actors were announced on August 7, 2008. It was announced that TV Tokyo would post a promotional movie on the Internet on September 27, 2008. It was broadcast by TV Tokyo Network Stations and first began airing on TV Tokyo on Sunday at 1:30 starting October 5, 2008, and ending on December 28, 2008. It adapts all the chapters of the manga except the chapter entitled "Supplementary Lesson - 'Today in Tennis Club'".

The anime adaptation featured six main theme songs, one opening that was also used as an ending theme, and five different ending themes. "Nisemono" (ニセモノ) is used as the opening theme for all the episodes except the last which does not feature an opening theme. "Secret Base (Kimi ga Kureta Mono)" (secret base 〜君がくれたもの〜) is used as the first ending theme from episodes one through three. "Daibakuhatsu No.1" (大爆発 NO.1) is used as the second ending theme for episodes four and five. "Natsu Matsuri" (夏祭り) is used as the third ending theme for episode six. "Yūyake Iro" (ユウヤケイロ) is used as the third ending theme from episode seven to episode nine. "Negai" (願い) is used as the fifth ending theme from episode ten to episode twelve. "Nisemono" is used once again as the final ending theme in episode thirteen. The two songs, "Secret Base (Kimi ga Kureta Mono)" and "Daibakuhatsu No.1" are both covers of the same song performed by Zone. All the ending themes feature the voice actors for the main characters: Yū Kobayashi, Asami Shimoda, MAKO, Satomi Akesaka, Yōko Honda, and Kana Asumi under the band name Friends.

Four DVDs were released from December 25, 2008, to March 25, 2009, each containing three episodes except for the last which contains four. Each DVD is assigned a season in chronological order beginning from spring. An official fanbook was released on December 22, 2008, by Kodansha with an ISBN of 978-4-06-375627-2 and Yūki, Chika, and Kazumi as the cover characters.

=== CDs ===
Multiple music CDs have been released for Kyō no Go no Ni. The first was a maxi single entitled "Baby Love / Yakusoku" (Baby Love/約束) on March 23, 2006, by Avex Tracks under the catalog number AVCA-22708. The single contained three version for each "Baby Love" and "Yakusoku": two versions sung by the two sets of voice actors for Chika Koizumi, Kazumi Aihara, and Yūki Asano (Mai Kadowaki, Mamiko Noto, and Mikako Takahashi, followed by the respective members of Sweet Kiss) and an instrumental version. A maxi single entitled Nisemono was released on November 5, 2008, by King Records under the catalog number KICM-3175. This single contained "Nisemono" and "Secret Base (Kimi ga Kureta Mono)" in original and instrumental versions as sung by the group, Friends. A studio album of twelve tracks was released on January 7, 2009, entitled Best Friends, by King Records under the catalog number KICA-950. It included all six of the theme songs as sung by the group, Friends: "Nisemono", "Secret Base (Kimi ga Kureta Mono)", "Daibakuhatsu No.1", "Natsu Matsuri", "Yūyake Iro", and "Negai."

The anime adaptation's original soundtrack on December 10, 2008, by King Records under the catalog number KICA-945. Twenty-eight tracks of the album are background music whereas the other six tracks are the shortened versions of all the theme songs. The album is separated into four sections named chronologically after the seasons starting with spring.

=== Drama CDs ===
King Records has released two drama CDs adaptations of the series. The first CD is an eight-track album entitled 'Kyou no 5 no 2' Drama CD vol.1 (今日の5の2 ドラマCD vol.1) released on December 25, 2008, under the catalog number KICA-951. The second CD is a nine-track album entitled 'Kyou no 5 no 2' Drama CD vol.2 (今日の5の2 ドラマCD vol.2) released on February 25, 2009, under the catalog number KICA-952.

== Reception ==
Anime News Network's Carl Kimlinger praised the 2007 OVA's characters design as "smooth" and "shiny". He also praised the 2008 anime adaptation for almost entirely removing what he described as "squirm-inducing fan-service" as was present in the OVA adaptation.

== See also ==
- Minami-ke
