= Yoshikane =

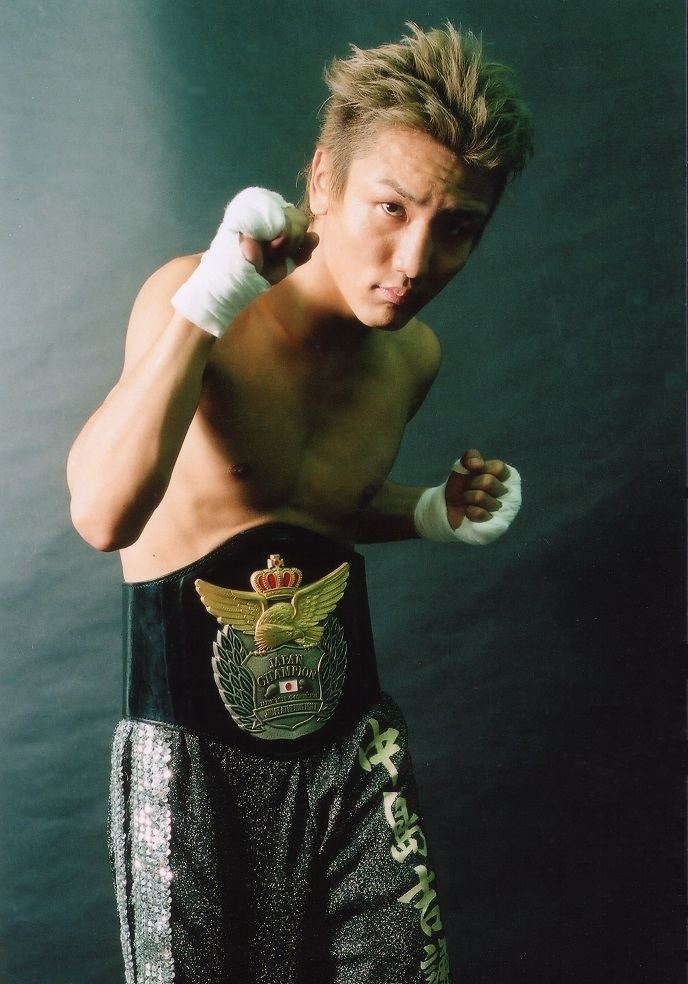
- Yoshikane Nakajima, Japanese boxer
- Pronunciation: joɕikane (IPA)
- Gender: Male

Origin
- Origin: Japanese
- Meaning: Different meanings depending on the kanji used

Other names
- Alternative spelling: Yosikane (Kunrei-shiki) Yosikane (Nihon-shiki) Yoshikane (Hepburn)

Yoshikane is a masculine Japanese given name.

== Written forms ==
Yoshikane can be written using different combinations of kanji characters. Here are some examples:

- 義金, "justice, gold"
- 義兼, "justice, simultaneous"
- 義鐘, "justice, bell"
- 吉金, "good luck, gold"
- 吉兼, "good luck, simultaneous"
- 吉鐘, "good luck, bell"
- 善金, "virtuous, gold"
- 善兼, "virtuous, simultaneous"
- 善鐘, "virtuous, bell"
- 芳金, "virtuous/fragrant, gold"
- 芳兼, "virtuous/fragrant, simultaneous"
- 芳鐘, "virtuous/fragrant, bell"
- 良金, "good, gold"
- 良兼, "good, simultaneous"
- 良鐘, "good, bell"
- 芳兼, "virtuous/fragrant, simultaneous"
- 喜金, "rejoice, gold"
- 慶兼, "congratulate, simultaneous"

The name can also be written in hiragana よしかね or katakana ヨシカネ.

== Notable people with the name ==
- Yoshikane Ashikaga (足利 義兼; 1154–1199), Japanese samurai
- Yoshikane Fujiwara (藤原 義懐; 957–1021), Japanese noble
- Yoshikane Mizuno (水野 義兼; born 1954), Japanese astronomer
