= Minami-ke =

Japanese manga series

- First tankōbon volume cover, featuring Kana Minami

みなみけ
- Genre: Comedy, slice of life
- Manga
- Written by: Koharu Sakuraba
- Published by: Kodansha
- Imprint: Young Magazine KC
- Magazine: Weekly Young Magazine
- Original run: March 1, 2004 – present
- Volumes: 29
- Anime television series
- Directed by: Masahiko Ohta
- Written by: Takashi Aoshima
- Music by: Yasuhiro Misawa
- Studio: Daume
- Original network: TXN (TV Tokyo), AT-X
- Original run: October 7, 2007 – December 30, 2007
- Episodes: 13
- Anime television series

Minami-ke: Okawari
- Directed by: Naoto Hosoda
- Written by: Masashi Suzuki
- Music by: Yasuhiro Misawa
- Studio: Asread
- Original network: TXN (TV Tokyo), AT-X
- Original run: January 6, 2008 – March 30, 2008
- Episodes: 13
- Anime television series

Minami-ke: Okaeri
- Directed by: Kei Oikawa
- Written by: Rie Oshika
- Music by: Yasuhiro Misawa
- Studio: Asread
- Original network: TXN (TV Tokyo), AT-X
- Original run: January 4, 2009 – March 29, 2009
- Episodes: 13
- Original video animation

Minami-ke: Betsubara
- Directed by: Kei Oikawa
- Written by: Rie Oshika
- Music by: Yasuhiro Misawa
- Studio: Asread
- Released: June 23, 2009
- Original video animation

Minami-ke: Omatase
- Directed by: Keiichiro Kawaguchi
- Written by: Takamitsu Kōno
- Music by: Yasuhiro Misawa
- Studio: Feel
- Released: October 5, 2012
- Anime television series

Minami-ke: Tadaima
- Directed by: Keiichiro Kawaguchi
- Written by: Takamitsu Kōno
- Music by: Yasuhiro Misawa
- Studio: Feel
- Licensed by: NA: Crunchyroll
- Original network: Tokyo MX, CTC, tvk, Teletama, TVA, MBS, TVh, AT-X, BS11
- Original run: January 6, 2013 – March 30, 2013
- Episodes: 13
- Original video animation

Minami-ke: Natsuyasumi
- Directed by: Keiichiro Kawaguchi
- Written by: Takamitsu Kōno
- Music by: Yasuhiro Misawa
- Studio: Feel
- Released: August 6, 2013
- Anime television series

Minami-ke: Korekara
- Directed by: Jun'ichi Kitamura
- Written by: Takamitsu Kōno
- Music by: Yasuhiro Misawa
- Studio: Liden Films
- Original run: April 2027 – scheduled
- icon

Minami-ke (みなみけ; 'The Minami Family') is a Japanese manga series written and illustrated by Koharu Sakuraba. It has been serialized in Kodansha's seinen manga magazine Weekly Young Magazine since March 2004. The series focuses on the everyday life of three sisters: Haruka, Kana, and Chiaki Minami. An anime series produced by Daume aired in 2007. Asread produced a second season in 2008 titled Minami-ke: Okawari, a third season in 2009 titled Minami-ke: Okaeri, and an original video animation (OVA) episode in 2009 titled Minami-ke: Betsubara. In 2012, Feel produced another OVA titled Minami-ke: Omatase, followed by a fourth anime series in 2013 titled Minami-ke: Tadaima. A fifth anime series titled Minami-ke: Korekara and produced by Liden Films is set to premiere in April 2027.

== Premise ==
The story centers on the day-to-day life of the Minami family. It follows three sisters, Haruka, Kana, and Chiaki, as they get into various shenanigans with their friends and classmates.

== Characters ==
=== Minami sisters ===
Haruka Minami (南 春香, Minami Haruka)
Voiced by: Rina Satō
Haruka is the oldest sister and in her second year of high school. She has been taking care of her younger sisters for many years, which led to some misunderstandings with her classmates. Haruka is the most reliable of the three sisters, but is infinitely lazy when she is by herself. She was referred to as a "Banchō" during her junior-high days, although it was revealed soon after that it was simply a title. She is the only person whom Chiaki views as a role model and greatly respects. This can be seen in her tendency to address Haruka as "nee-sama" instead of the more usual and casual "nee-san"; and the only person Chiaki uses polite Japanese with (even though it is not customary for siblings to use polite Japanese towards each other). "Haruka" contains the kanji for "spring".
Kana Minami (南 夏奈, Minami Kana)
Voiced by: Marina Inoue
Kana is the middle sister in her second year of junior-high school. Kana is an impulsive and lively girl who never thinks before acting. She is a horrible cook, a chronic oversleeper, and is obsessed with Chiaki treating her as an adorable older sister rather than as a foil. She often acts or talks impolitely without thinking, much to the annoyance of Chiaki. She has been misled by Chiaki into thinking that Fujioka has a grudge against her rather than a crush. She generally does not get good grades in school, though she thinks that if she puts on Keiko's glasses she will act and speak intelligently. She frequently invents random new holidays and also recruits Chiaki's classmates into joining her silly escapades. "Kana" contains the kanji for "summer".
Chiaki Minami (南 千秋, Minami Chiaki)
Voiced by: Minori Chihara
Chiaki is the youngest sister in elementary school. She is in class 5–2 (a reference to Kyo no Gononi). Her high intelligence often makes her over-analyze simple situations; her speech patterns are those of an adult male and her wit is caustic. She is extremely cynical and tends to ignore idiotic behavior displayed by Kana and Makoto. She respects and adores Haruka, while often, if not always, resorts to beating Kana for her idiocy. Although being the youngest, she is the meanest out of the three; most of the time, she is quiet during group activities, and almost always uses the word "bakayarō" (meaning 'dumbass' or simply 'you fool' in Japanese), which is a more forceful form for "idiot" in Japanese ("baka" being the less forceful term). Chiaki seems to know that Fujioka is genuinely in love with Kana. After talking with Haruka, Chiaki has come to associate Fujioka as a father figure and will often place herself on his lap when she seeks fatherly affection or to complete the family experience. She seems to like Fuyuki, and seems to miss him after moving away. "Chiaki" contains the kanji for "autumn".

=== Other Minami family ===
Tōma Minami (南 冬馬, Minami Tōma)
Voiced by: Nana Mizuki
Tōma is a tomboy girl in class 5–1 who, despite having the same surname, is not related to the Minami sisters. However, Chiaki adopted her as a little brother because of the same surname. She has three older brothers that know nothing about her. Her tomboy action can be said to be an influence by her brothers. The way she acts, looks and dresses causes Fujioka to actually believe that she is a boy. "Tōma" contains the kanji for "winter"; Chiaki declares that Tōma is the younger because "winter follows autumn". She is very good at sewing; she is able to make a teddy bear similar to the one owned by Chiaki.
Haruo Minami (南 ハルオ, Minami Haruo)
Voiced by: Shinji Kawada
He is the eldest son of the other Minami family. It is unclear whether or not he is still in high school. Though calm and composed in his demeanor, it seems as though he is in a state of denial concerning the adverse effects the brothers' lifestyle is having on their younger sister. "Haru" in his name probably refers to "spring." Despite being the eldest, Haruo's physical strength is underwhelming, compared to Natsuki, being sent meters away by a mere pat to the shoulder.
Natsuki Minami (南 ナツキ, Minami Natsuki)
Voiced by: Hiroyuki Yoshino
Second son of the other Minami family, and is in first year of high school. He used to be a delinquent, but had calmed down after Hosaka recruited him to the volleyball club. He got beaten up by Haruka the first time they met due to a misunderstanding, with him touching her chest (in the manga, he accidentally hugs her instead). Despite this, he harbors no ill feelings towards her and instead shows signs of embarrassment and indirect affection towards her, this is made evident when the eldest Minami brother talks about having a girlfriend and Natsuki immediately pictures a provocatively dressed Haruka in his mind and suffers a nose-bleed. "Natsu" in his name probably refers to "summer."
Akira Minami (南 アキラ, Minami Akira)
Voiced by: Tatsuya Hayama
Third son of the other Minami family, and is in first year of junior high school. Maybe because of the gap in their age, he is treated as a child in the other Minami household and is often told not to interrupt when the other two elder brothers are talking. He likes long-haired girls, especially Riko, who is in the same class as Kana. Fujioka dislikes him because he assumes that he is close to Kana. He crossdresses as Aki-chan when he is around Fujioka inside the Minami household. "Aki" in his name probably refers to "autumn."

=== High school students ===
Maki (マキ)
Voiced by: Reiko Takagi
Haruka's classmate and a bit of an airhead. A member of the volleyball club. She tries to protect Haruka from Hosaka, a running gag, which always end with her remarking Hosaka as disgusting (気持ち悪い, kimochiwarui).
Atsuko (アツコ)
Voiced by: Ryoko Ono
Haruka's classmate. A member of the volleyball club. A very quiet girl, quite similar in character to Keiko.
Hosaka (保坂)
Voiced by: Daisuke Ono
A third year, and captain of the volleyball club. He greatly admires Haruka and would like her to become the volleyball club's manager, and his girlfriend. He has a tendency to act cool, stripping and fantasizing in front of people, to the point of being considered a narcissist, causing those who know him to label him as a weirdo, especially Maki and her signature phrase of labeling him as "disgusting". He is also skilled at cooking and is a perfectionist at it.
Hayami (速水)
Voiced by: Saeko Chiba
Third year. A member of the volleyball club (often acting like the leader of their team) as well as an associate of Hosaka. She is cunning and mischievous and is often thinking of rather devious plans (usually involving Haruka and Hosaka). She is good at manipulating Hosaka. She has a distinctive smiling expression and loves alcohol which she calls high-grade "juice". Kana is the only one smart enough not to drink the "juice", while still managing to get everyone else drunk.
Hitomi (ヒトミ)
Voiced by: Ayaka Saito
She is a first-year student in the same class as Natsuki. She has an interest in him and believes she can read him by looking at his eyes. When Natsuki forgot his lunch, she offered him some of hers, then lent him money to buy a yakisoba-pan, and when he forgot his umbrella, she offered a pink one decorated with bunnies to him to use. However, she also mistakenly interprets Natsuki's love-struck look at Haruka to be directed at herself and believes Natsuki has feelings for her.

=== Junior-high school students ===
Fujioka (藤岡)
Voiced by: Tetsuya Kakihara
Kana's classmate. He plays soccer and is a popular classmate of Kana. He is in love with Kana. But Chiaki reads his love letters as letters of challenge, which Kana believes nicknaming him Banchō (番長), meaning a leader of juvenile delinquents, as a result. Although it was only a nickname given to him by Kana during that time, he officially took the title when Yū did not want it. She deliberately loses a rock-paper-scissor game with Fujioka in order to get rid of it, making Fujioka the fourth generation Banchō. He is a bit naive and very innocent towards girls. His affection towards Kana will often make him do regrettable things but because of them he has had the opportunity to become closer with the family and visits them often. Chiaki has come to associate him as a father figure and will often place herself on his lap when she seeks fatherly affection or to complete the family experience. He is the only person who does not know that Tōma is actually a girl.
Keiko (ケイコ)
Voiced by: Saori Goto
Kana's friend, an honor student. She is often ignorantly persuaded by Kana and dragged into her silly escapades.
Riko (リコ)
Voiced by: Ao Takahashi
Kana's classmate. She has a crush on Fujioka and views Kana as a love rival, but befriends her to get close to Fujioka. Also has the same random personality as Kana and is a bully to other girls on the show.
Yū (ユウ)
Voiced by: Momoko Ohara
Third year. She is a senior to Kana. Reluctantly nicknamed third generation Banchō in school, Yū gladly hands over the title to Fujioka when she intentionally loses a "Rock-Paper-Scissors" duel to him.
Hiroko (ヒロコ)
Voiced by: Saeko Chiba
Third year. Yū's best friend and classmate.
Miyuki (ミユキ)
Voiced by: Yoshino Nanjō
Kana's classmate. She has the same height as Chiaki.

=== Elementary school students ===
Makoto (マコト)
Voiced by: Rika Morinaga
Chiaki's classmate. He is nicknamed "Idiotic child" which his classmates believe is more of an impression of him than a nickname. He has a crush on Haruka, and goes as far as cross dressing (first forced upon him by Kana) to avoid detection from Chiaki, who became jealous and angry with him after he helped Haruka cook dinner, in order to see her at the Minami residence. When he crossdresses, he is referred to as "Mako-chan". Only Uchida, Kana, and Tōma knows of his cross-dressing habit.
Yoshino (吉野)
Voiced by: Aki Toyosaki
Chiaki's classmate. She seems to be the most responsible and level headed among the characters her age. Might have found out that Mako-chan is really Makoto.
Shūichi (シュウイチ)
Voiced by: Momoko Ohara
Chiaki's classmate. Nicknamed "Plain Yogurt" by Chiaki because he does not have any qualities that stand out.
Yuka Uchida (内田 ユカ, Uchida Yuka)
Voiced by: Eri Kitamura
In class 5–1. Chiaki's friend. She helps Makoto with his cross-dressing along with Kana. She is not seen as a smart character and was actually forced by Makoto to join "Team Idiot". Impulsive and a little lacking in common sense, she is belittled by Chiaki and Keiko often, and recruited by Kana to join her silly escapades.
Fuyuki (フユキ)
Voiced by: Miho Saiki
He is an original character in Okawari. He is a transfer student and a neighbor of the Minami sisters. His inability to refuse favors or demands plagues his very existence and annoys Chiaki to no end. Due to this characteristic behavior, he is often asked to do tasks outside his responsibilities. He seems to like Chiaki.

=== Other ===
Takeru (タケル)
Voiced by: Shintaro Asanuma
First cousin of the three sisters. He occasionally visits the Minami sisters to check up on them and give them their monthly allowance. He often makes blunders and Kana, in contrast to Haruka and Chiaki, feels he is "pathetic". He later starts to feel some resentment towards Fujioka because he feels as if he is closer to the three girls than he should be. He has an on-and-off relationship with a girl called Reiko. His hair is brown in the first series but changed to green in Okawari; then back to brown in Okaeri.
Ninomiya/Sensei (二宮/先生)
Voiced by: Momoko Ohara (Ninomiya)
Voiced by: Shintaro Asanuma (Sensei)
Characters from a drama television show the Minami family watches during dinner. Ninomiya is a student who falls in love with her unnamed teacher (Sensei). There is a video game adaption of the drama show, owned by Keiko.

== Media ==
=== Manga ===
Minami-ke, written and illustrated by Koharu Sakuraba, started in Kodansha's seinen manga magazine Weekly Young Magazine on March 1, 2004. Kodansha has collected its chapters into individual tankōbon volumes. The first volume was released on November 3, 2004. As of November 6, 2026, 29 volumes have been released.

==== Volumes ====
No.	Release date	ISBN
1	November 3, 2004	4-06-361286-4
2	November 2, 2005; November 4, 2005 (LE)	4-06-361377-1; 4-06-362048-4 (LE)
3	November 6, 2006	4-06-361484-0; 4-06-362069-7 (LE)
4	September 6, 2007	4-06-361593-6
5	March 17, 2008	978-4-06-361653-8; 978-4-06-362108-2 (LE)
6	June 23, 2009	978-4-06-361795-5; 978-4-06-937297-1 (LE)
7	July 6, 2010	978-4-06-361901-0; 978-4-06-362164-8 (LE)
8	March 4, 2011	978-4-06-382006-5; 978-4-06-358343-4 (LE)
9	November 4, 2011	978-4-06-382097-3; 978-4-06-358363-2 (LE)
10	October 5, 2012	978-4-06-382225-0; 978-4-06-358406-6 (LE)
11	August 6, 2013	978-4-06-382337-0; 978-4-06-358457-8 (LE)
12	August 6, 2014	978-4-06-382337-0
13	May 1, 2015	978-4-06-358776-0; 978-4-06-358776-0 (LE)
14	March 4, 2016	978-4-06-382744-6
15	August 5, 2016	978-4-06-382830-6; 978-4-06-358823-1 (LE)
16	June 6, 2017	978-4-06-382978-5
17	June 6, 2018	978-4-06-511644-9
18	April 5, 2019	978-4-06-515198-3
19	October 4, 2019	978-4-06-517292-6
20	June 5, 2020	978-4-06-519988-6
21	December 4, 2020	978-4-06-521723-8
22	July 6, 2021	978-4-06-523988-9
23	March 4, 2022	978-4-06-527121-6
24	February 6, 2023	978-4-06-530076-3
25	December 6, 2023	978-4-06-533927-5
26	June 6, 2024	978-4-06-535586-2
27	February 6, 2025	978-4-06-538172-4
28	September 5, 2025	978-4-06-540795-0
29	November 6, 2026	978-4-06-544236-4

Fanbooks

- Minami-ke + Kyo no Gononi Character Fanbook ISBN 4-06-372190-6
- TV Animation Minami-ke Fanbook ISBN 978-4-06-375426-1

=== Anime ===
There are four anime television series and three original video animation (OVA) adaptations of Minami-ke, done by three separate animation studios. The first season, under the original title Minami-ke, is produced by Daume and aired on TV Tokyo between October 7 and December 30, 2007. A second anime series produced by Asread aired between January 6 and March 30, 2008, under the title Minami-ke: Okawari (みなみけ おかわり; lit. The Minami Family: A Second Helping), and also aired on TV Tokyo. It deviates slightly from the first season as it utilizes a different color palette, has different school designs, and uses different character designs. It is also different in storytelling as it uses material not from the manga, and each episode consists of only one story. A third anime series, also by Asread and titled Minami-ke: Okaeri (みなみけ おかえり; lit. The Minami Family: Welcome Home), aired between January 4 and March 29, 2009. It is more closely related to the first season as the character design and color palette is more similar, although there are still designs that are from season two. It also returns to the episodic format from the first season.

On June 23, 2009, a limited edition of the sixth volume of the manga series was bundled with a DVD containing a single OVA episode done by Asread and titled Minami-ke: Betsubara (みなみけ べつばら; colloquially, "betsubara" refers to an imaginary second stomach that is reserved for desserts). On October 5, 2012, a limited edition of the tenth volume of the manga series was bundled with a DVD containing a single OVA by studio Feel titled Minami-ke: Omatase (みなみけ おまたせ; lit. The Minami Family: Sorry to Keep You Waiting). A fourth season of the anime, also by Feel and titled Minami-ke: Tadaima (みなみけ ただいま; lit. The Minami Family: I'm Home), aired between January 6 and March 30, 2013.

A fifth season of the anime was announced during the "Mixa Animation Diary 'Minami-ke' 20th Anniversary Tanabata Festival" event on July 7, 2024. Titled Minami-ke: Korekara (みなみけこれから; lit. The Minami Family: Going Forward), it will be produced by Liden Films and directed by Jun'ichi Kitamura, with Nobuhiro Andō designing their characters. The series is set to premiere in April 2027.
