= Sotsugyō (Zone song) =

"Sotsugyō 卒業"
- Cover of single release of Sotsugyō.

Single by Zone

from the album E: Complete A side Singles
- Released: February 4, 2004
- Genre: J-pop
- Length: 8:21
- Label: Sony Music
- Songwriter: Noriyuki Machida

Zone singles chronology
"'Boku no Tegami'" (2003)	"Sotsugyō 卒業" (2004)	"'Taiyō no Kiss'" (2004)

Sotsugyō (卒業; lit. "Graduation") is the twelfth major-label (and thirteenth over all) single from the Japanese pop group Zone. It was released on February 4, 2004 through Sony Music Records under their MSI label. Both limited and standard versions were released.

== History ==
"Sotsugyō" was released on February 4, 2004 through Sony Music Records under their MSI label. The single reached as high as #5 on the Oricon charts, and remained on the charts for eight weeks. In 2006, Oricon ran a user survey in which Zone's release of "Sotsugyō" was ranked #16 overall for "The Epitome of Graduation Songs".

The single was the band's twelfth single released under a major label, and the thirteenth overall. Two versions of the single were released: a standard version which included a calendar with a random single design, and a limited first pressing which came with a 2004 profile calendar with five different designs.

Noriyuki Machida composed and wrote the lyrics for both songs on the single. "Sotsugyō" was arranged by ha-j, and Album" was arranged by Tomoki Ishizuka. (Note: These individuals are listed in the single liner notes.)

=== Chart history ===
Chart (2004)	Release	Peak position
Oricon	"Sotsugyō/Album"	5

== Track listing ==
Standard release (catalog #SRCL-5702) Limited release (catalog #SRCL-6101)
No.	Title	Lyrics	Music	Length
1.	"Sotsugyō" (卒業)	Noriyuki Machida	Noriyuki Machida (composer) ha-j (arranger)	4:21
2.	"Album" (アルバム)	Noriyuki Machida	Noriyuki Machida (composer); Tomoki Ishizuka (arranger)	4:00
3.	"Sotsugyō" (backing track)		Noriyuki Machida (composer) ha-j (arranger)	4:21
4.	"Album" (backing track)		Noriyuki Machida (composer); Tomoki Ishizuka (arranger)	4:00
Total length:				8:21
