= Secret Base (Kimi ga Kureta Mono) =

Single by Zone

from the album Z
- A-side: "Secret Base (Kimi ga Kureta Mono)"
- B-side: "Shin Boku wa Magma"
- Released: August 8, 2001
- Genre: J-pop
- Label: Sony Music Records
- Composers: Norihiko Machida (track 1); Morika (track 2)
- Lyricists: Norihiko Machida (track 1); Zone (track 2)

Zone singles chronology
"Daibakuhatsu No. 1" (2001)	"Secret Base (Kimi ga Kureta Mono)" (2001)	"Sekai no Hon no Katasumi Kara" (2001)

"Secret Base (Kimi ga Kureta Mono)" (secret base 〜君がくれたもの〜; lit. "Secret Base (What You've Given Me)") is a song by Japanese all-female band Zone, released as their 3rd single on August 8, 2001.

== Background and release ==
"Secret Base (Kimi ga Kureta Mono)" is composed and written by Norihiko Machida. The single was released on August 8, 2001, as Zone's 3rd single under Sony Music Records. The song was used as the theme song in the television drama Kids War 3. The single was released with "Shin Boku wa Magma" as the B-side, with composition by Morika and lyrics by Zone.

== Reception ==
"Secret Base (Kimi ga Kureta Mono)" reached #2 on the Oricon Weekly Singles Chart. It ranked #8 in the top 10 nationwide songs of 2002 by JASRAC. In 2019, the song was certified triple platinum by the Japan Record Association.

== Track listing ==
Single
No.	Title	Lyrics	Music	Length
1.	"Secret Base (Kimi ga Kureta Mono) (secret base 〜君がくれたもの〜)"	Norihiko Machida	Norihiko Machida	4:55
2.	"Shin Boku wa Magma (新・僕はマグマ)"	Zone	Morika	3:24
3.	"Secret Base (Kimi ga Kureta Mono)" (Backing Tracks)		Norihiko Machida
4.	"Shin Boku wa Magma" (Backing Tracks)		Morika

== Charts ==
Chart	Peak position
Oricon Weekly Singles Chart	2

== Cover versions ==
Voice actresses Asami Shimoda, Kana Asumi, Mako, Satomi Akesaka, Youko Honda, and Yu Kobayashi (collectively known as the supergroup "Friends") performed a version of the song, serving as the first end theme of the 2008 anime series Kyō no Go no Ni.

On November 17, 2010, all-female rock band Scandal released a cover version as a promotional single for their second mini-album, R-GIRL's ROCK!. Later that year, a music video was also released for it.

Voice actresses Ai Kayano, Haruka Tomatsu, and Saori Hayami released two cover versions of "Secret Base (Kimi ga Kureta Mono)" as a CD single on April 27, 2011, one as a "10 Years After ver." and the other as a "Memento Mori ver." The song served as the ending theme for the anime series Anohana: The Flower We Saw That Day and the three were credited their characters: Meiko Honma, Naruko Anjo, and Chiriko Tsurumi. The single debuted at #10 on the Oricon Weekly Charts and #4 on the Billboard Japan Hot Animation Charts.

In 2015, Silent Siren released a cover version as the B-side to their single "Hachigatsu no Yoru", which was used as the theme song for the live-action television drama adaptation of Anohana: The Flower We Saw That Day.
