= Frank Hayes (jockey) =

Irish jockey (1901–1923)

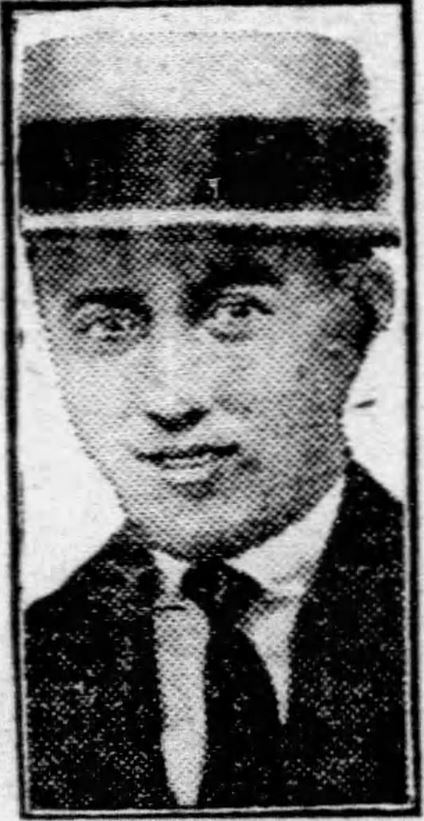
- Born: 1901; Ireland
- Died: 4 June 1923 (aged 22); Elmont, New York, US
- Cause of death: Heart attack
- Occupations: Horse trainer; stableman; jockey

Frank Hayes (1901 – 4 June 1923) was an Irish horse trainer, stableman and jockey who, on 4 June 1923, at Belmont Park racetrack in Elmont, New York, won a steeplechase despite suffering a fatal heart attack in the latter part of the race.

== Biography and death ==
Hayes was 22 at the time of his death. He had never won a race before, as by profession he was not a jockey but a horse trainer and stableman. The horse, a 20:1 outsider called Sweet Kiss, was owned by Miss A. M. Frayling. Hayes died in the latter part of the race and his body remained in the saddle when Sweet Kiss crossed the finish line, winning by a head, making him the first, and so far only, jockey known to have won a race after death. Some theorized rapid weight loss contributed to his death.

== Aftermath ==
Hayes' death was not discovered until Miss Frayling and race officials came to congratulate him shortly after the race. It was suggested that the fatal heart attack may have been brought on by Hayes' extreme efforts to meet the weight requirements, as a newspaper reported he had slimmed down from 142 pounds (64 kg) to 130 pounds (59 kg) in "the last few days". Sweet Kiss was reported to have cantered to a halt a further 100 yards from the finish line, when the "jockey slipped slowly over his mount's side, fell face downward and lay still."

After the discovery of Hayes' death, all further post-race formalities were waived by the Jockey Club, the result being declared official without the weighing in. Hayes was buried three days later, dressed in his racing silks at Holy Cross Cemetery in Brooklyn, New York City. The horse never raced again, and it is claimed that Sweet Kiss was nicknamed "Sweet Kiss of Death" for the rest of her life.
