= Saaya Irie =

Japanese gravure model, actress and television personality (born 1993)

- 入江紗綾
- Born: November 15, 1993 (age 33); Kitakyushu, Fukuoka, Japan
- Other name: Saaya
- Occupations: Gravure model; actress; television personality
- Years active: 2005–present
- Height: 151 cm (4 ft 11 in)
- Spouse: Unknown (m. 2022)
- Children: 2

Saaya Irie (入江紗綾, Irie Saaya; born November 15, 1993) is a Japanese gravure model, actress, television personality and former singer. Her stage name is simply her given name, Saaya.

In addition to her modeling work she has recently been appearing in numerous films, radio, and television programs. She has also done voice work, appearing in the anime OVA Kyo no Gononi as Chika Koizumi. She was formerly a member of Japanese musical group Sweet Kiss before it disbanded on May 12, 2006, to be replaced by the group Chase.

== Biography ==
=== As a model ===
Irie was born in Kitakyushu, Fukuoka, Japan. During her childhood she idolized Yoshika, a fashion model from Kitakyushu, but she gained fame for her professional glamour modeling as a U-15 idol, making her debut at age 11. Her bikini pictures soon received widespread distribution over the Internet. She became famous for having very developed breasts for a girl her age, which were repeatedly highlighted in her photographs. At the age of 11 three photobooks of her were published and several accompanying videos were released at the same time, featuring her posing sensually in swimwear and lingerie. In October 2015, Saaya released her 12th photobook, and appeared in 46 solo gravure idol DVDs through 2018.

On January 12, 2025, she announced on her Instagram that she was taking a break from gravure works.

=== Personal life ===
After making her debut as a model, she still lived in Fukuoka Prefecture where she attended elementary school and middle school, but moved to Tokyo when she turned 16. In August 2014, she contracted Dengue fever during the 2014 Dengue fever outbreak.

On May 20, 2022, she announced on both her Instagram and Twitter accounts that she is married and that she was pregnant with her first child. She later moved her entertainment activities to her husband's hometown in Hiroshima. On September 30, she gave birth to a healthy baby girl named Kiko. In November 2024, the couple held their traditional wedding ceremony at Itsukushima Shrine in Miyajima. On November 15, 2025, her 32nd birthday, she announced that she was pregnant with her second child. On March 17, 2026, she gave birth to her second child.

Her ancestors were the Nabeshima family, lords of the Hizen Saga Domain.

== Filmography ==
=== TV programs ===
- Kyuyo Meisai (TV Tokyo, 2005)
- Government Crime Investigation Agent Zaizen Jotaro (TV Asahi, 2006), as a communication officer
- Gekito! Idol Yokibou (KBS, July 2006), as Suzuka Hayata
- Hell Girl (2007 live action), as Tsugumi Shibata (Nippon TV, 2006)
- Manga-Kissa Toshi-Densetsu Noroi no Manna san (BS-i, 2008)
- Ghost Friends (NHK, 2009), as Risa
- Kiss×Kiss×Kiss (2010)
- King's Brunch (TBS, 2014)
- TV-ha (HTV, 2025)

=== Radio programs ===
- Gekito! Idol Yokibou (Osaka Broadcasting Corporation, released in July 2006)

=== OVA ===
- Kyo no Gononi (as Chika Koizumi; produced by avex)
- Note: She only sang for the Sweet Kiss version of the opening and ending songs and did not play Chika in the OVA itself. Mai Kadowaki played Chika. On the special edition of the DVD series there was a special audio track. Saaya and Chase were on the second audio track.

=== Films ===
- God's Left Hand, Devil's Right Hand or Kami no hidarite Akuma no migite (神の左手 悪魔の右手) 2006
- Shibuya Kaidan parts 1 & 1 (渋谷 怪談 THEリアル都市伝説) 2006
- Kani Goalkeeper (かにゴールキーパー) 2006
- Carved or Kuchisake-onna (口裂け女) 2007 (all members of Chase in this movie)
- Pussy Soup (The Cat Cook) or Neko Râmen Taishô (猫ラーメン大将) 2008
- Hard Revenge Milly 2008
- Girl's Box 2008
- Yamagata sukurîm 2009
- Seifuku sabaigâru I 2010
- The Purple Mirror (horror) 2010
- Rock and Roll Diet 2010
- Yomutoshinu: Death Comic Part I and Part II (movie version) 2011
- Marry's Phone (Martial arts and horror) 2011

=== Web programs ===
- It's your CHOICE! episode 2

=== Stage ===
- Samurai Warriors (戦国無双, Sengoku Musō) (2015), Inahime

== Discography ==
=== Chase ===
- Chase Me! (1st single)

=== Sweet Kiss ===
- Baby Love (opening to the anime OVA Kyo no Gononi)
- Yakusoku (ending to the anime OVA Kyo no Gononi)

=== Sweet Kiss ===
- Sweet Kiss (May 2005, Elk Heart Promotion) ISBN 4-341-78006-9
- Very Sweet Vol.2 (December 2005, Elk Heart Promotion)

=== Chase ===
- 激闘!アイドル予備校 紗綾・留奈・梨央 [Battle! Idol Prep-School – Saaya, Runa, Rio] (September 2006, E-Net Frontier)
