= Zone (band) =

Japanese rock band

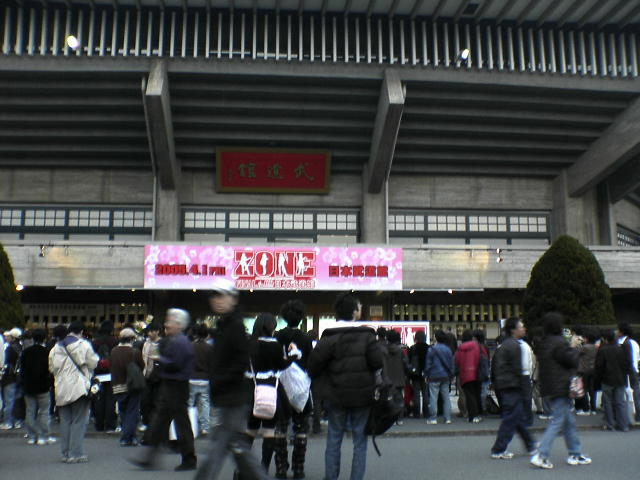
- ZONE Final in Budokan

Background information
- Origin: Sapporo, Japan
- Genres: J-pop; rock
- Years active: 1997–2005; 2011–2013
- Label: Sony Music
- Past members: Miyu Nagase; Mizuho Saito; Maiko Sakae; Takayo Ookoshi; Tomoka Nishimura

Zone (ゾーン) was an all-female rock band started in Sapporo, Japan, in 1997. It started as a dance group and turned into an all-female band. Zone has been categorized in a new genre called "bandol" (a portmanteau of the words "band" and "idol"). The band was started and managed by Studio RunTime and its first single, "Good Days", was released by the major record label Sony Records, on February 7, 2001. The group officially disbanded on April 7, 2013, when the last remaining member, Maiko Sakae, held the band's final event.

Zone's most famous song is "Secret Base (Kimi ga Kureta Mono)", released on August 8, 2001. It sold about 744,000 copies in Japan.

== History ==
Zone started with eight members in 1997, then reduced to six and finally to four – Miyu Nagase, Mizuho Saito, Maiko Sakae and Takayo Ookoshi – by the time it released its first indie disc in 1999.

Tadayuki Ominami, a representative of Sony Records, noticed that the crowd reaction at the group's first concert was particularly enthusiastic. Initially, Zone was solely focused on singing and dancing. Ominami watched a live video of the band playing with instruments at the KomeKome Klub and felt that, due to the overabundance of dance groups, Zone had the makings of a breakthrough act, provided they could play their instruments as well as sing and dance.

In late 2003, Ookoshi announced her departure from Zone to pursue her studies and was replaced by Tomoka Nishimura, one of the two original members cut from the band when it was reduced from six members to four.

Between 1999 and 2005, Zone released 17 hit singles, three full-length CDs and three DVDs, appeared in commercials and a television special, in addition to attending high school. They all graduated.

Zone officially disbanded on April 1, 2005, after playing a final concert at Nippon Budokan. On April 13, a greatest hits album, E: Complete A Side Singles, was released. The album entered the charts at number 1 with first-week sales of about 98,000 copies, the band's first number-one album on the Japanese Oricon charts.

In February 2011, Nagase, Sakae and Nishimura announced that they would be reuniting (without Saito) for the 10th anniversary of "Secret Base". The group released Zone Tribute in August and made several concert appearances. In November, Nishimura announced that she would be leaving the band for health reasons. Nagase and Sakae continued as a duo, and released "Treasure of the Heart" in June 2012.

In February 2013, Nagase's contract with RunTime Music Agency was dissolved with the company claiming "immoral behaviour" and "frequent non-fulfillment of duties". On March 2, Maiko posted on the official website for RunTime Entertainment that she would be ending ZONE. On April 7, Sakae held the band's final event, "ZONE FINAL EVENT", at Shibuya O-EAST, officially bringing ZONE to a close.

== Band members ==
- Takayo Ookoshi (大越 貴代, Ōkoshi Takayo) —vocals, guitar and leader (1999–2003)
- Miyu Nagase (長瀬 実夕, Nagase Miyu)—lead vocals and guitar (1999–2005, 2011–2013)
- Mizuho Saito (斎藤 瑞穂, Saitō Mizuho)—vocals, drums and leader (1999–2005)
- Maiko Sakae (栄 舞子, Sakae Maiko)—vocals and bass guitar (1999–2005, 2011–2013)
- Tomoka Nishimura (西村 朝香, Nishimura Tomoka)—vocals and guitar (2004–2005, 2011)

== Music ==
Zone's music has been used in the 2003 Astro Boy series (opening theme, "True Blue" and second ending theme, "Tetsuwan Atomu: ballad version") and the Japanese release of Ice Age (theme song, "Hitoshizuku").

"Shiroi Hana" was used as the theme song to Final Fantasy Tactics Advance in Japan.

"Secret Base (Kimi ga Kureta Mono)" was covered and used as the ending theme to the anime Kyō no Go no Ni and Anohana: The Flower We Saw That Day by the voice actors of the respective anime.

"Secret Base (Kimi ga Kureta Mono)" was covered by the Japanese band SCANDAL. A music video of this version has also been made.

== Discography ==
=== Singles ===
1. "Believe in Love" (December 18, 1999) (indies)
2. "Good Days" (February 7, 2001)
3. "Dai Bakuhatsu No.1" (大爆発 No.1) (May 23, 2001)
4. "Secret Base (Kimi ga Kureta Mono)" (Secret Base ～君がくれたもの～) (August 8, 2001)
5. "Sekai no Hon no Katasumi kara" (世界のほんの片隅から) (November 14, 2001)
6. "Yume no Kakera..." (夢ノカケラ...) (February 14, 2002)
7. "Hitoshizuku" (一雫) (July 17, 2002)
8. "Akashi" (証) (September 26, 2002)
9. "Shiroi Hana" (白い花) (November 27, 2002)
10. "True Blue/Renren..." (True Blue/恋々...) (April 16, 2003)
11. "Hanabi (Kimi ga Ita Natsu)" (H・A・N・A・B・I ～君がいた夏～) (July 30, 2003)
12. "Boku no Tegami" (僕の手紙) (October 29, 2003)
13. "Sotsugyō" (卒業) (February 4, 2004)
14. "Taiyō no Kiss" (太陽のKiss) (June 2, 2004)
15. "Glory Colors (Kaze no Tobira)" (Glory Colors ～風のトビラ～) (August 4, 2004)
16. "Egao Biyori" (笑顔日和) (March 9, 2005)
17. "Treasure of the Heart~キミとボクの奇跡~" (Kimi to Boku no Kiseki) (June 6, 2012)

=== Studio albums ===
1. Z (February 14, 2002)
2. O (November 27, 2002)
3. N (February 18, 2004)
4. E: Complete A side Singles (2 discs) (April 13, 2005)
5. Ura E: Complete B side Melodies (April 19, 2006)

=== Other album appearances ===
1. Music for Atom Age (March 19, 2003)
2. Astro Girlz & Boyz (July 16, 2003)
3. Love for Nana: Only 1 Tribute (March 16, 2005)
4. Zone Tribute (Limited two disc set) (August 10, 2011)

=== DVDs ===
1. Zone Clips 01: Sunny Side (October 29, 2003)
2. Zone Clips 02: Forever Side (March 17, 2004)
3. Zone TV special "Yume Hajimatta Bakari" DVD edition (Zone TV special "ユメハジマッタバカリ" DVD edition) (September 29, 2004)
4. Zone Clips 03: 2005 Sotsugyō (Zone Clips 03 ~2005 卒業~) (May 18, 2005)
5. Zone Final in Nippon Budokan 2005/04/01: Kokoro o Komete Arigatou (Zone Final in 日本武道館 2005/04/01 ～心を込めてありがとう～, Zone Final Live in Nippon Budokan: Thank You from the Bottom of My Heart) (June 22, 2005)
6. Zone Best Memorial Clips (May 24, 2006)
7. 10 Nen Go no 8 Gatsu... Zone Fukkatsushima SHOW!! - Dosokai Dayo! Zenin Shugo! (「10年後の8月・・・」ZONE復活しまっSHOW!!〜同窓会だよ全員集合!〜 August, 10 years later... Zone Fukkatsushima SHOW!! - Reunion! Everyone together!) (December 21, 2011)
