= Koharu Sakuraba =

Japanese manga artist

Koharu Sakuraba 桜場 コハル
- Area: Manga artist
- Notable works: Minami-ke

Koharu Sakuraba (桜場 コハル, Sakuraba Koharu; alt. "Coharu Sakuraba") is a Japanese manga artist. His best-known work is Minami-ke, a slice-of-life comedy about three sisters, which has run in Young Magazine since 2004 and has been adapted into an anime that has run multiple seasons. Sakuraba's other works include Kyō no Go no Ni (Today in Class 5–2), which also had an anime run; and Sonna Mirai wa Uso de Aru (The Future Is a Lie).

== Works ==
- Kyō no Go no Ni – serialized in Bessatsu Young Magazine, 2002–2003; published by Kodansha for 1 volume.
- Minami-ke – serialized in Young Magazine, 2004–ongoing; published by Kodansha for 26 volumes.
- Sonna Mirai wa Uso de Aru (そんな未来はウソである; lit. The Future is a Lie) – serialized in Bessatsu Shōnen Magazine, 2009–2016; published by Kodansha for 6 volumes.
