= Yoshika Yuhnagi =

Japanese model (1983–2001)

- Born: February 8, 1983; Kitakyushu, Fukuoka
- Died: January 4, 2001 (aged 17)
- Modeling information
- Height: 5 ft 11 in (1.80 m) at the time of the autopsy

Yoshika Yuhnagi (優奈木 よしか, February 8, 1983 - January 4, 2001), better known simply as Yoshika or Yuhnagi (夕凪 / ゆーなぎ), was a Japanese fashion model.

Born in Yahatahigashi-ku, Kitakyūshū to parents from Kumamoto and Okinawa, Yuhnagi grew up in the city and began both professional and commercial fashion modeling at the age of 11. Her early commercial appearances were for Fukuoka-local teen magazines.

== Biography ==
=== History ===
After being discovered by a Shogakukan's magazine editor, at the age of 12, she began appearing in a number of well-known fashion magazines such as Vivi and Seventeen under her several stage names, and also in several TV / print ads. She signed exclusive contracts with at least 9 fashion houses in her first 3 years of modeling.

She was notorious for her violence against people especially men such as male designers, and her alcohol issues as she was a heavy drinker. One of her alcohol-related incidents took place in August 2000, when she was arrested together with another fashion model, allegedly her friend Anna Tsuchiya, after running full-naked on Omiya's mainstreet and in a public high school filled with hundreds of students, while under the influence of a large amount of alcohol. Tsuchiya (also naked but shown only from the waist up for short times) chased Yuhnagi but failed to catch her, and then Yuhnagi assaulted a policeman who subdued Tsuchiya, and eventually she was arrested. TV Saitama's News 930 channel reported this incident, but sank their names for a voluntary restraint related to the Youth Act law, describing Yuhnagi as a "rampaging young girl with dyed, pink-colored hair and some heavy accent, a professional model".

In late 2000, as a high-featured teenage model with a rapidly rising popularity, she appeared on several television programs which included TV Asahi's Tonight 2 and TBS's Wonderful.

=== Death ===
On January 4, 2001, after drinking too much Shochu, Vodka and Dom Perignon, Yuhnagi slept in a park located near her condominium and was frozen, eventually died of hypothermia, at the age of 17. She was not an alcoholic in medical terms, but some witnesses assumed that she in her later days would drink not for pleasure, as it seemed more like an obsession as if she was possessed by something.

=== Legacy ===
Near the end of 2010, according to Natsuki Kato's column on the Nikkei BP magazine, several Kyushu-born fashion models, including Rena Takeshita, paid tribute to Yuhnagi with a special banquet in Otsu. As of 2011, ten years after her death, her name has still not been forgotten in her homeland, the Northern Kyushu area. A Fukuoka-based lifestyle magazine named Fukuoka-mon conducted a poll in March 2011, on which Yoshika was named one of the five most popular fashion models among women in their twenties there.
