= Mao Kobayashi (model) =

Japanese junior idol (born 1992)

- Born: January 12, 1992 (age 34); Tokyo, Japan
- Modeling information
- Hair color: Black
- Eye color: Brown

Mao Kobayashi (小林 万桜; born January 12, 1992 in Tokyo, Japan) is a Japanese junior idol and model who made her debut in 1999. She released a CD single as part of Doll's Vox and was a member of the idol group Momo mint's. As of June 2008, there have been nine photography books published of her. She also appears in many magazines, such as issues of Chu-Boh, Koh-Boh, Moecco high school, and Puchi Girl.

== Publications ==
=== Photobooks ===
Title	Release date	Produced by	ISBN
万桜12歳	2004	ぶんか社	ISBN 978-4-8211-2599-9
万桜12歳～夏休み～	2004	ぶんか社	ISBN 978-4-8211-2623-1
小林万桜12歳~美少女ソナタ~ もも組3番	2004	バウハウス	ISBN 978-4-89461-998-2
万桜12歳～早春～	2005	ぶんか社	ISBN 978-4-8211-2651-4
万桜13歳～純白～	2005	ぶんか社	ISBN 978-4-8211-2664-4
万桜13歳～熟果～	2006	ぶんか社	ISBN 978-4-8211-2675-0
万桜13歳～豊潤～	2006	ぶんか社	ISBN 978-4-8211-2679-8
万桜14歳～桃桜～	2006	ぶんか社	ISBN 978-4-8211-2683-5
開花!?	2007-04-24	彩文館出版	ISBN 978-4-7756-0202-7

== Filmography ==
=== TV ===
- Tensai Terebi kun (天才てれびくん)
- Boku ga boku de arukoto (ぼくがぼくであること) (2005) as Natsuyo

=== DVDs ===
As of June 2010, the following DVDs have her as the main character:

- Holy Angel (2004-03-25 kaado shoppu torujaa) TREJ-0002
- まお12歳 (2004-02-25 FUGA) GAFD-005
- まおII 12歳 (2004-06-10 FUGA) GAFD-014
- 万桜12歳 夏休み (2004-07-21 Bunkasha) BKDV-00025
- 小林万桜12歳 美少女ソナタ さくらぐみ (2004-10-27 Bauhaus) BHD18-30
- 万桜12歳～早春～ (2005-02-23 Bunkasha) BKDV-00069
- 万桜13歳 (2005-05-23 Garo Aida) GARO-001
- 万桜13歳～熟果～ (2005-07-29 Bunkasha) BKDV-00094
- 小林万桜とぴゅあ★フレンズ (2005-09-26 ai makksu) IMOD-002
- 万桜13歳～純白～ (2005-12-23 Bunkasha) BKDV-00136
- 万桜13歳～豊潤～ (2006-03-24 Bunkasha) BKDV-00163
- 万桜14歳 (2006-06-21 Garo Aida) GARO-005
- 電車と少女 万桜のちょこっと旅行（都電荒川線）(2006-06-21 Garo Aida) GARO-006
- Alluring Eyes~芽艶 (2006-07-22 riberutasu) LBTD-002
- 万桜14歳～桃桜～ (2006-09-29 Bunkasha) BKDV-00203
- 万桜14歳～万開～ (2006-11-24 Bunkasha) BKDV-00217
- たぶんコドモ!? 小林万桜 (2007-03-22 Air control) KQT-097
- たぶんオトナ!? 小林万桜 (2007-03-22 Air control) KQT-098
- Angel Kiss ～大人の予感～ 小林万桜 (2007-06-22 TRICO) TRID-021
- mao self 小林万桜 (2007-09-28 BM.3) KBOOT-14
- 艶めいて咲く花に… 小林万桜 (2008-04-28 オルスタックピクチャーズ) FPO-0001
- 美少女ひとりぢめ 1 小林万桜 ～永久保存版～ (2010-01-01 Piecemore) PKMC-003
- 美少女ひとりぢめ 2 小林万桜 ～永久保存版～ (2010-01-01 Piecemore) PKMC-004

In this idol DVD, she is among other characters:

- 町美少女トロピカル vol.01 (2006-08-11 toraianguru foosu) QWE-01

She also makes an appearance in the following low-budget direct-to-DVD movies, with her and other Japanese idols as the cast:

- ときめき美少女cafe ～いとしのマーメイドたち～ (2005-12-21 puri sutaru) TREJ-0012
- 聖少女戦士 St．ヴァルキリー THD-15481
- 実写版 マイコうそみたい! (2007-09-21) DSTS-007

== Discography ==
=== Albums ===
- Hanahubuki (花吹雪ハニー・チップス) 桜mint's
- Yumemiru omocha bako (夢見るオモチャ箱～恋する) (Dancing Doll) Doll's Vox
