= 2006 Japanese television dramas =

←2005 - 2006 - 2007→ This is a list of Japanese television dramas often called doramas by fans.

== 2006 Winter Season ==
Series

Japanese Title	Romaji Title	TV Station	Time Frame	Starring Actors	Theme Song(s)	Episodes	Average Ratings
小早川伸木の恋	Nobuki Kobayakawa no Koi	Fuji TV	Thursdays 22:00~22:54; 12 January 2006 to 23 March 2006	Toshiaki Karasawa, Naohito Fujiki, and Nana Katase	Nanamusica "くるりくるり" (Kururi Kururi)	11	11.45%
Ns'あおい	Nurse Aoi	Fuji TV	Tuesdays 21:00~21:54; 10 January 2006 to 21 March 2006	Satomi Ishihara	Kobukuro "桜" (Sakura)	11	14.17%
西遊記	Saiyūki	Fuji TV	Mondays 21:00~21:54; 9 January 2006 to 20 March 2006	Shingo Katori, Teruyoshi Uchimura, Satoshi Ito, Eri Fukatsu, and Asami Mizukawa	MONKEY MAJIK "Around The World"	11	22.8%
アンフェア	UNFAIR	Fuji TV	Tuesdays 22:00~22:54; 10 January 2006 to 21 March 2006	Ryoko Shinohara, Eita, Masaya Kato, and Mari Hamada	Yuna Ito "Faith" Destiny's Child "Survivor" (Insert Song)	11	15.4%
白夜行	Byakuyakō	TBS	Thursdays 21:00~21:54; 12 January 2006 to 23 March 2006	Takayuki Yamada and Haruka Ayase	Kō Shibasaki "影" (Kage)	11	12.28%
ガチバカ!	Gachibaka!	TBS	Thursdays 22:00~22:54; 19 January 2006 to 23 March 2006	Katsunori Takahashi, Waka Inoue, Kotaro Koizumi, Saori Takizawa, Yuya Tegoshi, and Takahisa Masuda	Mai Kuraki "ベスト オブ ヒーロー" (Best of Hero)	10	7.8%
輪舞曲	RONDO	TBS	Sundays 22:00~22:54; 15 January 2006 to 26 March 2006	Yutaka Takenouchi, Choi Ji-woo, Yoshino Kimura, Naoki Sugiura, Mocomichi Hayami, Yui Ichikawa, and Ryuta Sato	Ayaka "I Believe"	11	15.51%
夜王～YAOH～	YAOH	TBS	Fridays 22:00~22:54; 13 January 2006 to 24 March 2006	Masahiro Matsuoka, Kazuki Kitamura, Karina, and Jun Kaname	TOKIO "Mr.Traveling Man"	11	15.47%
時効警察	Jikou Keisatsu	TV Asahi	Fridays 23:15~24:10; 13 January 2006 to 10 March 2006	Joe Odagiri and Kumiko Asō	CEYREN "雨" (Ame)	9	10.1%
けものみち	Kemonomichi	TV Asahi	Thursdays 21:00~21:54; 19 January 2006 to 16 March 2006	Ryoko Yonekura and Tōru Nakamura	Miyuki Nakajima "帰れない者たちへ" (Kaerenai Monotachi e)	9	
神はサイコロを振らない	Kami wa Saikoro wo Furanai	NTV	Wednesdays 22:00~22:54; 18 January 2006 to 15 March 2006	Satomi Kobayashi, Eri Tomosaka, Tarō Yamamoto, and Shinji Takeda	Ryohei feat.Verbal (M-Flo) "Onelove"	9	9.6%
喰いタン	Kui-tan	NTV	Saturdays 21:00~21:54; 14 January 2006 to 11 March 2006	Noriyuki Higashiyama, Go Morita, and Kotomi Kyono	B'z "結晶" (Kesshou)	9	17.37%

== 2006 Spring Season ==
Series

Japanese Title	Romaji Title	TV Station	Time Frame	Starring Actors	Theme Song(s)	Episodes	Average Ratings
アテンションプリーズ	Attention Please	Fuji TV	Tuesdays 21:00~21:54; 18 April 2006 to 27 June 2006	Aya Ueto, Ryo Nishikido, Saki Aibu, Kotaro Koizumi, and Miki Maya	Kimura Kaela "OH PRETTY WOMAN"	11	16.37%
医龍-Team Medical Dragon-	Iryuu -Team Medical Dragon-	Fuji TV	Thursdays 22:00~22:54; 13 April 2006 to 29 June 2006	Kenji Sakaguchi, Izumi Inamori, Teppei Koike, and Kazuki Kitamura	Ai "Believe"	11	14.8%
弁護士のくず	Bengoshi no Kuzu	TBS	Thursdays 22:00~22:54; 13 April 2006 to 29 June 2006	Etsushi Toyokawa, Hideaki Itō, Reiko Takashima, and Aki Hoshino	hitomi "GO MY WAY"	11	12.74%
クロサギ	Kurosagi	TBS	Fridays 22:00~22:54; 14 April 2006 to 23 June 2006	Tomohisa Yamashita, Maki Horikita, Koji Kato, Yui Ichikawa, and Tsutomu Yamazaki	Tomohisa Yamashita "抱いてセニョリータ" (Daite Senorita)	11	15.67%
おいしいプロポーズ	Oishii Propose	TBS	Sundays 21:00~21:54; 23 April 2006 to 25 June 2006	Kyōko Hasegawa, Keisuke Koide, Mao Kobayashi, Eiko Koike, and Saeko	Tomiko Van "Flower"	10	12.0%
トップキャスター	Top Caster	TBS	Mondays 21:00~21:54; 17 April 2006 to 26 June 2006	Yūki Amami, Akiko Yada, Hiroshi Tamaki, Shosuke Tanihara, Nao Matsushita, and Shota Matsuda	Sowelu "Dear friend"	11	18.3%
富豪刑事2	Fugou Keiji 2	TV Asahi	Fridays 21:00~21:54; 21 April 2006 to 23 June 2006	Kyoko Fukada and Isao Natsuyagi	Taku Ozeki "トライアングル・ライフ" (Triangle Life)	10	12.0%
7人の女弁護士	Shichinin no Onna Bengoshi	TV Asahi	Thursdays 21:00~21:54; 13 April 2006 to 8 June 2006	Yumiko Shaku, Masaru Nagai, Sachie Hara, Waka Inoue, Rie Shibata, Naomi Kawashima, and Yōko Nogiwa	AAA "ハリケーン・リリ、ボストン・マリ" (Hurricane Lily, Boston Mary)	9	12.05%
ギャルサー	Gyarusa- ; Gal Circle	NTV	Saturdays 21:00~21:54; 15 April 2006 to 24 June 2006	Naohito Fujiki, Erika Toda, Mari Yaguchi, Emi Suzuki, Ryuta Sato, Katsuhisa Namase, and Arata Furuta	Naohito Fujiki "HEY!FRIENDS"	11	12.9%
プリマダム	Primadem	NTV	Wednesdays 22:00~22:54; 12 April 2006 to 21 June 2006	Hitomi Kuroki, Arata Furuta, Akina Nakamori, Yuto Nakajima, and Uno Kanda	Akina Nakamori "花よ踊れ" (Hana yo Odore)	11	11.2%
ブスの瞳に恋してる	Busu no Hitomi ni Koishiteru	Fuji TV	Tuesdays 22:00~22:54; 11 April 2006 to 27 June 2006	Goro Inagaki, Tomoko Murakami, Yuri Ebihara, MEGUMI, Saori Takizawa, Shigeru Muroi, and Shigeaki Kato	Kumi Koda "恋のつぼみ" (Koi no Tsubomi) MIYU "ビューティフル・マインド" (Beautiful Mind)	12	15.9%

== 2006 Summer Season ==
Series

Japanese Title	Romaji Title	TV Station	Time Frame	Starring Actors	Theme Song(s)	Episodes	Average Ratings
サプリ	Sapuri	Fuji TV	Mondays 21:00~21:54; 10 July 2006 to 18 September 2006	Misaki Ito, Kazuya Kamenashi, Eita, Miho Shiraishi, Mirai Shida, Ryou, and Kōichi Satō	ayaka "Real Voice" "ブルーデイズ" (Blue Days) (Insert Song) KAT-TUN "You"	11	14.2%
不信のとき～ウーマン・ウォーズ～	Fushin no Toki ~Woman Wars~	Fuji TV	Thursdays 22:00~22:54; 6 July 2006 to 21 September 2006	Ryoko Yonekura, Yuki Matsushita, Ken Ishiguro, Kaoru Sugita, and Kotaro Koizumi	Ann Lewis "あゝ無情" (A~ Mujou) Saki Fukuda "Goodbye My Love" (Insert Song)	12	12.9%
結婚できない男	Kekkon Dekinai Otoko	Fuji TV	Tuesdays 22:00~22:54; 4 July 2006 to 19 September 2006	Hiroshi Abe, Yui Natsukawa, Ryoko Kuninaka, and Takashi Tsukamoto	Every Little Thing "スイミー" (Swimmy)	12	17.1%
ダンドリ。～Dance☆Drill～	DanDori.~Dance☆Drill~	Fuji TV	Tuesdays 21:00~21:54; 11 July 2006 to 19 September 2006	Nana Eikura, Rosa Kato, and Masuda Takahisa	UVERworld "SHAMROCK"	11	8.9%
誰よりもママを愛す	Dare Yorimo Mama wo Ai su	TBS	Sundays 21:00~21:54; 2 July 2006 to 10 September 2006	Masakazu Tamura, Yuki Uchida, Tetsuji Tamayama, Mitsuki Nagashima, Ran Ito, and Satomi Kobayashi	Fukumimi "惑星タイマー" (Wakusei Timer)	11	10.4%
花嫁は厄年ッ!	Hanayome wa Yakudoshi!	TBS	Thursdays 22:00~22:54; 6 July 2006 to 21 September 2006	Ryoko Shinohara, Hiroyuki Yabe, Shima Iwashita, and Keiichiro Koyama	SUEMITSU & THE SUEMITH "Astaire"	12	12.0%
タイヨウのうた	Taiyou no Uta	TBS	Fridays 22:00~22:54; 14 July 2006 to 15 September 2006	Erika Sawajiri, Takayuki Yamada, Nao Matsushita, Jun Kaname, Chieko Kuroda, and Masanobu Katsumura	Kō Shibasaki "invitation" Insert Songs: Kaoru Amane "タイヨウのうた" (Taiyou no Uta) "Stay with me" Tachibana Masami "Wish"	10	10.3%
レガッタ～君といた永遠～	Regatta~Kimi to Ita Eien~	TV-Asahi	Fridays 21:00~21:54; 14 July 2006 to 8 September 2006	Mokomichi Hayami, Saki Aibu, Shota Matsuda, and Chinatsu Wakatsuki	Kobukuro "君という名の翼" (Kimi to Iu Na no Tsubasa) Daniel Powter "Bad Day" (Insert Song)	9	5.4%
下北サンデーズ	Shimokita Sundays	TV-Asahi	Thursdays 21:00~21:54; 13 July 2006 to 7 September 2006	Aya Ueto, Kuranosuke Sasaki, Mayumi Sada	Fumiya Fujii "下北以上 原宿未満" (Shimokita Ijou Harajuku Miman)	9	7.3%
CAとお呼びっ!	CA to Oyobbi!	NTV	Wednesdays 22:00~22:54; 5 July 2006 to 13 September 2006	Alisa Mizuki, Shōsuke Tanihara, Karina, and Naomi Nishida	Nakanomori Band "Fly High"	11	9.5%
マイ☆ボス マイ☆ヒーロー	MY☆BOSS MY☆HERO	NTV	Saturdays 21:00~21:54; 8 July 2006 to 16 September 2006	Tomoya Nagase, Yui Aragaki, Yuya Tegoshi, and Koki Tanaka	TOKIO "宙船" (Sorafune)	10	18.9%

== 2006 Fall Season ==
Series

Japanese Title	Romaji Title	TV Station	Time Frame	Starring Actors	Theme Song(s)	Episodes	Average Ratings
僕の歩く道	Boku no Aruku Michi	Fuji TV	Tuesdays 22:00~22:54; 10 October 2006 to 19 December 2006	Tsuyoshi Kusanagi, Karina, Kuranosuke Sasaki, MEGUMI	SMAP "ありがとう" (Arigatou)	11	18.2%
Dr.コトー診療所 2006	Dr. Coto's Clinic 2006	Fuji TV	Thursdays 22:00~22:54; 12 October 2006 to 21 December 2006	Hidetaka Yoshioka and Kō Shibasaki	Miyuki Nakajima "銀の龍の背に乗って" (Gin no Ryuu no Se ni Notte) Kō Shibasaki "思い出だけではつらすぎる" (Omoide Dake de wa Tsurasugiru) (Insert Song)	11	22.1%
のだめカンタービレ	Nodame Cantabile	Fuji TV	Mondays 21:00~21:54; 16 October 2006 to 25 December 2006	Hiroshi Tamaki, Juri Ueno, Saeko, Eita, Asami Mizukawa, and Keisuke Koide	Performed by the Nodame Orchestra: Beethoven "Symphony No. 7" George Gershwin "Rhapsody in Blue" (Insert Song)	11	18.8%
役者魂!	Yakusha Damashii!	Fuji TV	Tuesdays 21:00~21:54; 17 October 2006 to 26 December 2006	Takako Matsu, Makoto Fujita, Mirai Moriyama, and Rosa Kato	Takako Matsu "みんなひとり" (Minna Hitori) Mariya Takeuchi "スロー・ラヴ" (Slow Love) (Insert Song)	11	9.64%
嫌われ松子の一生	Kiraware Matsuko no Isshou	TBS	Thursdays 22:00~22:54; 12 October 2006 to 21 December 2006	Rina Uchiyama, Jun Kaname, Eiko Koike, Emi Suzuki, and Yu Koyanagi	BACCHUS "In The Mood"	11	8.19%
セーラー服と機関銃	Sailor Fuku to Kikanjyuu	TBS	Fridays 22:00~22:54; 13 October 2006 to 24 November 2006	Masami Nagasawa and Shinichi Tsutsumi	Hoshi Izumi "セーラー服と機関銃" (Sailor-fuku to Kikanjyuu)	7	13.3%
鉄板少女アカネ!!	Teppan Shoujo Akane!!	TBS	Fridays 22:00~22:54; 15 October 2006 to 10 December 2006	Maki Horikita, Takashi Tsukamoto, and Takanori Jinnai	Orange Range "Sayonara"	9	8.7%
だめんず・うぉ～か～	Damens Walker	TV Asahi	Thursdays 21:00~21:54; 12 October 2006 to 7 December 2006	Norika Fujiwara, Yu Yamada, Hiroyuki Miyasako, Sayaka Aoki, Hitomi Shimatani, and Seiichi Tanabe	Kumi Koda "夢のうた" (Yume no Uta) "ふたりで..." (Futari de...) (Insert Song) SHOWTA. "Trans-winter～冬の向こう側～" (Trans-winter~Fuyu no Mukou Soba~) (Insert Song)	8	8.075%
家族～妻の不在・夫の存在～	Kazoku~Tsuma no Fuzai・Otto no Sonzai~	TV Asahi	Fridays 21:00~21:54; 20 October 2006 to 8 December 2006	Yutaka Takenouchi, Yuriko Ishida, Shusei Uto, and Tetsuya Watari	EXILE "Everything"	8	11.9%
14才の母	Jyuuyon-sai no Haha	NTV	Wednesdays 22:00~22:54; 11 October 2006 to 20 December 2006	Mirai Shida, Misako Tanaka, Katsuhisa Namase, Sayaka Yamaguchi, Shigeru Muroi, Haruma Miura, and Kazuki Kitamura	Mr. Children "しるし" (Shirushi)	11	19.5%
たったひとつの恋	Tatta Hitotsu no Koi	NTV	Saturdays 21:00~21:54; 14 October 2006 to 16 December 2006	Kazuya Kamenashi, Haruka Ayase, Erika Toda, Koki Tanaka, Yuta Hiraoka, and Jun Kaname	KAT-TUN "僕らの街で" (Bokura no Machi de)	10	11.6%

== See also ==
- List of Japanese television dramas
