= 2005 Japanese television dramas =

←2004 - 2005 - 2006→ This is a list of Japanese television dramas often called doramas by fans.

== 2005 Spring Season ==
Series

Japanese Title	Romaji Title	TV Station	Time Frame	Starring Actors	Theme Song(s)	Episodes	Average Ratings
恋におちたら～僕の成功の秘密～	Koi ni Ochitara~Boku no Seikou no Himitsu~	Fuji TV	Thursdays 22:00~22:54; 14 April 2005 to 13 June 2005	Tsuyoshi Kusanagi	Crystal Kay "恋におちたら" (Koi ni Ochitara)	11	16.3%
離婚弁護士II～ハンサムウーマン～	Rikon Bengoshi II ~Handsome Woman~	Fuji TV	Tuesdays 21:00~21:54; 19 April 2005 to 21 June 2005	Yūki Amami, Tetsuji Tamayama	Mai Hoshimura "EVERY"	11	13.2%
エンジン	ENGINE	Fuji TV	Mondays 21:00~21:54; 18 April 2005 to 27 June 2005	Takuya Kimura, Koyuki, Juri Ueno	Jimmy Cliff "I Can See Clearly Now"	11	22.4%
曲がり角の彼女	Magarikado no Kanojo	Fuji TV	Tuesdays 22:00~22:54; 19 April 2005 to 21 June 2005	Izumi Inamori, Yumiko Shaku, Jun Kaname	shela "Dear my friends"	11	14.5%
夢で逢いましょう	Yume de Aimashou	TBS	Thursdays 21:00~21:54; 2005-04-xx to 2005-06-xx	Akiko Yada, Manabu Oshio, Yu Yamada, Masaru Nagai	Yumi Matsutoya "ついてゆくわ" (Tsuiteyuku wa)	11	11.6%
汚れた舌	Kegareta Shita	TBS	Thursdays 22:00~22:54; 2005-04-xx to 2005-06-xx	Naoko Iijima	dorlis "肌のすきま" (Hada no Sukima)	11	10.0%
あいくるしい	Ai Kurushii	TBS	Sundays 21:00~21:54; 10 April 2005 to 26 June 2005	Hayato Ichihara, Haruka Ayase	Michael Jackson "Ben"	11	11.6%
タイガー&ドラゴン	Tiger & Dragon	TBS	Fridays 22:00~22:54; 15 April 2005 to 24 June 2005	Tomoya Nagase, Junichi Okada	V6 "UTAO-UTAO"	11	12.8%
雨と夢のあとに	Ame to Yume no Ato ni	TV Asahi	Fridays 23:15~24:10; 15 April 2005 to 17 June 2005	Tomoka Kurokawa	Miwako Okuda "雨と夢のあとに" (Ame to Yume no Ato ni)	10	9.8%
アタックNo.1	Attack No.1	TV Asahi	Wednesdays 22:00~22:54; 14 April 2005 to 23 June 2005	Takanori Jinnai, Shigeru Muroi	Aya Ueto "夢のチカラ" (Yume no Chikara)	11	13.1%
瑠璃の島	Ruri no Shima	NTV	Saturdays 21:00~21:54; 16 April 2005 to 18 June 2005	Riko Narumi, Yutaka Takenouchi	Kobukuro "ここにしか咲かない花" (Koko ni Shika Sakanai Hana)	10	12.6%

== 2005 Summer Season ==
Series

Japanese Title	Romaji Title	TV Station	Time Frame	Starring Actors	Theme Song(s)	Episodes	Average Ratings
電車男	Densha Otoko	Fuji TV	Thursdays 22:00~22:54; 7 July 2005 to 22 September 2005	Misaki Ito, Atsushi Itō, Miho Shiraishi, Mokomichi Hayami	Sambomaster "世界はそれを愛と呼ぶんだぜ" (Sekai wa Sore wo Ai to Yobundaze)	11	21.0%
海猿 UMIZARU EVOLUTION	Umizaru Evolution	Fuji TV	Tuesdays 21:00~21:54; 5 July 2005 to 13 September 2005	Hideaki Itō, Ai Kato	B'z "OCEAN"	11	13.2%
スローダンス	Slow Dance	Fuji TV	Mondays 21:00~21:54; 4 July 2005 to 12 September 2005	Satoshi Tsumabuki, Naohito Fujiki, Eri Fukatsu, Ryōko Hirosue	Masaharu Fukuyama "東京" (Tokyo)	11	16.8%
がんばっていきまっしょい	Ganbatte Ikimasshoi	Fuji TV	Tuesdays 22:00~22:54; 5 July 2005 to 13 September 2005	Anne Suzuki, Ryo Nishikido	aiko "キラキラ" (Kirakira)	10	12.4%
幸せになりたい!	Shiawase ni Naritai!	TBS	Thursdays 21:00~21:54; 14 July 2005 to 15 September 2005	Kyoko Fukada, Yuki Matsushita	Sugar "ひまわり" (Himawari)	10	11.8%
女系家族	Nyokei Kazoku	TBS	Thursdays 22:00~22:54; 20 October 2005 to 22 December 2005	Ryoko Yonekura	Miki Imai "愛の詩" (Ai no Uta)	11	13.85%
いま、会いにゆきます	Ima, Ai ni Yukimasu	TBS	Sundays 21:00~21:54; 3 July 2005 to 18 September 2005	Mimura, Hiroki Narimiya, Akashi Takei	Orange Range "キズナ" (Kizuna)	10	11%
ドラゴン桜	Dragon Zakura	TBS	Fridays 22:00~22:54; 8 July 2005 to 16 September 2005	Hiroshi Abe, Kyōko Hasegawa, Tomohisa Yamashita, Masami Nagasawa, Yui Aragaki, Teppei Koike, Saeko, and Akiyoshi Nakao	melody. "realize" Tomohisa Yamashita "カラフル" (Colorful) (Insert Song)	11	16.4%
はるか17	Haruka Seventeen	TV Asahi	Fridays 23:15~24:10; 1 July 2005 to 16 September 2005	Aya Hirayama	N/A	10	8.9%
菊次郎とさき 2	Kikujirou to Saki 2	NTV	Wednesdays 22:00~22:54; 21 July 2005 to 15 September 2005	Takanori Jinnai, Shigeru Muroi	Toshinobu Kubota "Club Happiness"	9	14.9%
女王の教室	Joou no Kyoushitsu	NTV	Saturdays 21:00~21:54; 25 June 2005 to 17 September 2005	Yūki Amami, Mirai Shida	EXILE "EXIT"	11	15.7%

== 2005 Fall Season ==
Series

Japanese Title	Romaji Title	TV Station	Time Frame	Starring Actors	Theme Song(s)	Episodes	Average Ratings
大奥～華の乱～	Oooku ~Hana no Ran~	Fuji TV	Thursdays 22:00~22:54; 13 October 2005 to 22 December 2005	Rina Uchiyama	Tokyo Jihen "修羅場" (Shuraba)	10	15.7%
1リットルの涙	Ichi Rittoru no Namida	Fuji TV	Tuesdays 21:00~21:54; 11 October 2005 to 20 December 2005	Erika Sawajiri, Ryo Nishikido, Takanori Jinnai, Hiroko Yakushimaru, Riko Narumi, Naohito Fujiki	K "Only Human" Insert Songs: Remioromen "粉雪" (Konayuki) "3月9日" (Sangatsu Kokonoka)	11	15.3%
危険なアネキ	Kiken na Aneki	Fuji TV	Mondays 21:00~21:54; 17 October 2005 to 19 December 2005	Misaki Ito, Mirai Moriyama, Yumiko Shaku	Ken Hirai "Pop Star"	10	18.78%
鬼嫁日記	Oniyome Nikki	Fuji TV	Tuesdays 22:00~22:54; 11 October 2005 to 20 December 2005	Alisa Mizuki, Gori	Nakanomori BAND "Oh My Darlin'"	11	15.35%
ブラザー☆ビート	BROTHER☆BEAT	TBS	Thursdays 21:00~21:54; 13 October 2005 to 22 December 2005	Misako Tanaka, Tetsuji Tamayama, Mokomichi Hayami, Akiyoshi Nakao, and Ryoko Kuninaka	Def Tech "Broken Hearts" "My Way"	11	13.5%
今夜ひとりのベッドで	Konya Hitori no Beddo de	TBS	Thursdays 22:00~22:54; 20 October 2005 to 22 December 2005	Masahiro Motoki, Asaka Seto	Porno Graffitti "ジョバイロ" (Jobairo)	10	6.6%
恋の時間	Koi no Jikan	TBS	Sundays 21:00~21:54; 23 October 2005 to 25 December 2005	Hitomi Kuroki, Hiroyuki Miyasako	mihimaru GT "恋する気持ち" (Koisuru Kimochi)	10	10.3%
着信アリ	Chakushin Ari	TV Asahi	Fridays 23:15~24:10; 14 October 2005 to 16 December 2005	Rei Kikukawa, Ken Ishiguro	D.D.D. "Heart"	10	8.49%
熟年離婚	Jukunen Rikon	TV Asahi	Thursdays 21:00~21:54; 13 October 2005 to 8 December 2005	Tetsuya Watari, Reiko Takashima	COLOR "音色" (Neiro)	9	19.18%
あいのうた	Ai no Uta	NTV	Wednesdays 22:00~22:54; 12 October 2005 to 14 December 2005	Miho Kanno, Koji Tamaki, Hiroki Narimiya	Koji Tamaki "プレゼント" (Present)	10	9.7%
野ブタ。をプロデュース	Nobuta wo Produce	NTV	Saturdays 21:00~21:54; 15 October 2005 to 17 December 2005	Kazuya Kamenashi, Tomohisa Yamashita, and Maki Horikita	Shuuji to Akira "青春アミーゴ" (Seishun Amigo)	10	16.89%
花より男子	Hana Yori Dango	TBS	Fridays 22:00; 21 October 2005 to 16 December 2005	Mao Inoue, Jun Matsumoto, and Shun Oguri	Arashi "WISH"	9	19.6%

1. Gokusen 2 - starring Yukie Nakama, Kazuya Kamenashi, Jin Akanishi and Teppei Koike
2. H2~Kimi to itahibi (H2～君といた日々) - starring Takayuki Yamada, Yui Ichikawa and Ishihara Satomi
3. Sh15uya - starring Saya Yūki and Yui Aragaki

== See also ==
- List of Japanese television dramas
