= 2007 Japanese television dramas =

←2006 - 2007 - 2008→

This is a list of Japanese television dramas often called doramas by fans.

== 2007 winter season ==
Series

Japanese Title	Romaji Title	TV Station	Time Frame	Starring Actors	Theme Song(s)	Episodes	Average Ratings
エラいところに嫁いでしまった!	Erai Tokoro ni Totsuide Shimatta!	TV Asahi	Thursdays 21:00~21:54; 11 January 2007 to 8 March 2007	Yukie Nakama and Shosuke Tanihara	Yanawaraba- "拝啓○○さん" (Haikei MaruMaru-san)	9	12.8%
演歌の女王	Enka no Joou	NTV	Saturdays 21:00~21:54; 13 January 2007 to 17 March 2007	Yūki Amami and Taizo Harada	Ken Hirai "君の好きなとこ" (Kimi no Suki na Toko)	10	9.1%
華麗なる一族	Karei-naru Ichizoku	TBS	Sundays 21:00~21:54; 14 January 2007 to 18 March 2007	Takuya Kimura, Kyōka Suzuki, Kyōko Hasegawa, Yu Yamada, Saki Aibu, Tōru Nakamura, Izumi Inamori, and Hiroki Narimiya	"メインテーマ・オブ・華麗なる一族" (Main Theme of Karei-naru Ichizoku)	10	27.15%
きらきら研修医	Kirakira Kenshuui	TBS	Thursday 22:00~22:54; 11 January 2007 to 22 March 2007	Manami Konishi and Eiji Wentz	Ai Otsuka "CHU-LIP"	11	9.38%
花より男子2（リターンズ）	Hana Yori Dango 2 (Returns)	TBS	Fridays 22:00~22:54; 5 January 2007 to 16 March 2007	Mao Inoue, Jun Matsumoto, Shun Oguri, Shota Matsuda, Tsuyoshi Abe, Natsuki Katō, and Nanako Matsushima	Arashi "Love so sweet" Hikaru Utada "Flavor Of Life" (Insert Song)	11	21.7%
今週、妻が浮気します	Konshu, Tsuma ga Uwakishimasu	Fuji TV	Tuesdays 21:00~21:54; 16 January 2007 to 27 March 2007	Yūsuke Santamaria and Yuriko Ishida	CRAZY KEN BAND "た・す・け・て" (Ta.su.ke.te) "てんやわんやですよ" (Tenyawanya desuyo) MY LITTLE LOVER "あふれる" (Afureru) (Insert Song)	11	10.15%
東京タワー ～オカンとボクと、時々、オトン～	Tokyo Tower ~Okan to Boku to, Tokidoki, Oton~	Fuji TV	Mondays 21:00~21:54; 8 January 2007 to 19 March 2007	Mokomichi Hayami, Mitsuko Baisho, Shigeru Izumiya, Yu Kashii, Yūta Hiraoka, and Chen Bolin	Kobukuro "蕾" (Tsubomi)	11	14.9%
拝啓、父上様	Haikei, Chichiue-sama	Fuji TV	Thursdays 22:00~22:54; 11 January 2007 to 22 March 2007	Kazunari Ninomiya and Reiko Takashima	Ryoko Moriyama "パピエ" (PAPIE) "手" (Te)	11	13.19%
ハケンの品格	Haken no Hinkaku	NTV	Wednesdays 22:00~22:54; 10 January 2007 to 14 March 2007	Ryoko Shinohara, Ai Kato, and Kotaro Koizumi	Mika Nakashima "見えない星" (Mienai Hoshi)	10	20.1%
ヒミツの花園	Himitsu no Hanazono	Fuji TV	Tuesdays 22:00~22:54; 9 January 2007 to 20 March 2007	Yumiko Shaku, Masato Sakai, Tetsuhiro Ikeda, Jun Kaname, and Kanata Hongō	Namie Amuro "Baby Don't Cry"	11	12.41%
わるいやつら	Waruiyatsura	TV Asahi	Fridays 21:00~21:54; 19 January 2007 to 9 March 2007	Ryoko Yonekura and Kazuki Kitamura	Arashiro Beni "Luna"	8	9.4%

Specials

1. Maison Ikkoku (めぞん一刻) - starring Misaki Ito, Taiki Nakabayashi, Kayoko Kishimoto, Ittoku Kishibe, and Yumiko Takahashi
2. Attention Please: Honolulu - starring Aya Ueto, Ryo Nishikido

== 2007 spring season ==
Series

Japanese Title	Romaji Title	TV Station	Time Frame	Starring Actors	Theme Song(s)	Episodes	Average Ratings
ホテリアー	Hotelier	TV Asahi	Thursdays 21:00~21:54; 19 April 2007 to 14 June 2007	Aya Ueto, Mitsuhiro Oikawa, Seiichi Tanabe, Saeko, and Naomi Nishida	Aya Ueto "涙の虹" (Namida no Niji)	9	8.6%
喰いタン	Kuitan 2	NTV	Saturdays 21:00~21:54; 14 April 2007 to 23 June 2007	Noriyuki Higashiyama, Go Morita, and Kotomi Kyouno	TRIO THE SHAKiiiN "愛しのナポリタン" (Itoshi no Napolitain)	11	13.7%
冗談じゃない!	Joudanjyanai!	TBS	Sunday 21:00~21:54; 15 April 2007 to 24 June 2007	Yūji Oda, Juri Ueno, Kei Tanaka, Shinobu Ōtake and Junji Takada	Yūji Oda "Hug, Hug"	11	13.4%
孤独の賭け～愛しき人よ～	Kodoku no Kake ~Itoshiki Hito yo~	TBS	Thursdays 22:00~22:54; 12 April 2007 to 21 June 2007	Hideaki Itō, Natsuna Watanabe, Kyōko Hasegawa, Haruka Igawa, Masato Sakai, and Noriko Aota	Angela Aki "孤独のカケラ" (Kodoku no Kakera) melody. "Love Story" (Insert Song)	11	7.0%
花嫁とパパ	Hanayome to Papa	Fuji TV	Tuesdays 21:00~21:54; 10 April 2007 to 26 June 2007	Satomi Ishihara, Junnosuke Taguchi, Kotaro Koizumi, and Miho Shiraishi	Miliyah Kato "My Girl feat.COLOR"	12	11.8%
プロポーズ大作戦	Proposal Daisakusen (aka Operation Love)	Fuji TV	Mondays 21:00~21:54; 16 April 2007 to 25 June 2007	Tomohisa Yamashita, Masami Nagasawa, and Naohito Fujiki	Keisuke Kuwata "明日晴れるかな" (Ashita Harerukana)	11	17.3%
わたしたちの教科書	Watashitachi no Kyokasho	Fuji TV	Thursdays 22:00~22:54; 12 April 2007 to 28 June 2007	Miho Kanno, Atsushi Itō, and Mirai Shida	Bonnie Pink "Water Me"	12	11.2%
バンビ～ノ!	Bambino!	NTV	Wednesdays 22:00~22:54; 18 April 2007 to 27 June 2007	Jun Matsumoto, Kitamura Kazuaki, Karina Nose, and Ryuta Sato	Arashi "We Can Make It!"	11	14.2%
特急田中3号	Tokkyuu Tanaka Sangou	TBS	Fridays 22:00~22:54; 13 April 2007 to 22 June 2007	Koki Tanaka, Chiaki Kuriyama, Takashi Tsukamoto, and Rosa Kato	KAT-TUN "喜びの歌" (Yorokobi no Uta)	11	8.8%
鬼嫁日記 いい湯だな	Oniyome Nikki Ii Yu da na	Fuji TV	Tuesdays 22:00~22:54; 17 April 2007 to 26 June 2007	Alisa Mizuki, Gori, Masaru Nagai, Saori Takizawa, Mikihisa Azuma, Waka Inoue, and Teppei Koike	Nana Tanimura "Again"	11	12.0%
生徒諸君!	Seitoshokun!	TV Asahi	Fridays 21:00~21:54; 20 April 2007 to 22 June 2007	Rina Uchiyama, Maki Horikita, and Kanata Hongo	Yui "My Generation"	10	7.6%
セクシーボイスアンドロボ	Sexy Voice and Robo	NTV	Tuesdays 22:00~22:54; 10 April 2007 to 19 June 2007	Kenichi Matsuyama and Suzuka Ohgo	Mitsuki "ひとつだけ" (Hitotsu Dake)	11*	7.6%
LIAR GAME	Liar Game	Fuji TV	Saturdays 23:10~23:55; 14 April 2007 to 23 June 2007	Erika Toda and Shota Matsuda	None	11	11.4%
帰って来た時効警察	Kaettekita Jikou Keisatsu	TV Asahi	Fridays 23:15~24:10; 13 April 2007 to 8 June 2007	Joe Odagiri and Kumiko Asō	None	9	12.0%

- The seventh episode of Sexy Voice and Robo was not aired because the setting of the episode's story was similar to a kidnapping that happened around that time. The kidnapping caused the death of a police officer, and thus the episode was cancelled as not to be an unpleasant reminder of the event. The episode was replaced by a re-run of episode two, causing a dramatic decrease in the series' viewership. In actuality, only ten episodes were aired.

== 2007 summer season ==
Series

Japanese Title	Romaji Title	TV Station	Time Frame	Starring Actors	Theme Song(s)	Episodes	Average Ratings
スシ王子！	Sushi Ouji!	TV Asahi	Fridays 23:15–24:10; 27 July 2007 to 14 September 2007	Koichi Domoto, Yuichi Nakamaru	KinKi Kids "涙、ひとひら" (Namida, Hitohira)	8	7.5%
菊次郎とさき 3	Kikujirou to Saki 3	TV Asahi	Thursdays 21:00–21:54; 5 July 2007 to 13 September 2007	Takanori Jinnai, Shigeru Muroi, Takashi Tsukamoto, Tomoka Kurokawa	Yanawaraba "いちごいちえ" (Ichigo Ichie)	11	9.3%
牛に願いを Love&Farm	Ushi ni Negai wo - Love&Farm	Fuji TV	Tuesdays 22:00–22:54; 3 July 2007 to 11 September 2007	Tetsuji Tamayama, Eisuke Koide, Atsuhiko Nakata, Saki Aibu, Karina Nose, Erika Toda	Noriyuki Makihara "GREEN DAYS"	11	8.7%
ライフ	Life	Fuji TV	Saturdays 23:10–23:55; 30 June 2007 to 15 September 2007	Kie Kitano, Saki Fukuda	Mika Nakashima "Life"	11	12.16%
受験の神様	Juken no Kamisama	NTV	Saturdays 21:00~21:54; 14 July 2007 to 22 September 2007	Tatsuya Yamaguchi, Riko Narumi	TOKIO "本日、未熟者" (Honjitsu, Mijukumono)	9	9.5%
パパとムスメの7日間	Papa to Musume no Nanokakan	TBS	Sunday 21:00~21:54; 1 July 2007 to 19 August 2007	Hiroshi Tachi, Yui Aragaki, Shigeaki Kato	Yuki "星屑サンセット" (Hoshikuzu Sunset)	7	13.9%
肩ごしの恋人	Katagoshi no Koibito	TBS	Thursdays 22:00~22:54; 5 July 2007 to 6 September 2007	Ryoko Yonekura, Seiichi Tanabe, Masaru Nagai, Jun Kaname, Hiroyuki Ikeuchi	Mariya Takeuchi "チャンスの前髪" (Chance no Maegami)	9	7.4%
花ざかりの君たちへ～イケメン♂パラダイス～	Hanazakari no Kimitachi e～Ikemen♂Paradise～	Fuji TV	Tuesdays 21:00~21:54; 3 July 2007 to 18 September 2007	Maki Horikita, Shun Oguri, and Toma Ikuta	Ai Otsuka "PEACH" ORANGE RANGE "イケナイ太陽" (Ikenai Taiyou)	12	17.04%
ファースト・キス	First Kiss	Fuji TV	Mondays 21:00~21:54; 9 July 2007 to 17 September 2007	Mao Inoue, Hideaki Itō, Yuta Hiraoka	Kazumasa Oda "こころ" (Kokoro)	11	14.1%
山おんな壁おんな	Yama Onna Kabe Onna	Fuji TV	Thursdays 22:00~22:54; 5 July 2007 to 20 September 2007	Misaki Ito, Kyoko Fukada, Mitsuhiro Oikawa	EXILE "時の描片～トキノカケラ～" (Toki no Kakera)	12	12.1%
ホタルノヒカリ	Hotaru no Hikari	NTV	Wednesdays 22:00~22:54; 11 July 2007 to 12 September 2007	Haruka Ayase, Naohito Fujiki, Ryoko Kuninaka	aiko "横顔" (Yokogao)	10	13.6%
山田太郎ものがたり	Yamada Taro Monogatari	TBS	Fridays 22:00~22:54; 6 July 2007 to 14 September 2007	Kazunari Ninomiya, Sho Sakurai, Momoko Kikuchi	Arashi "Happiness"	10	15.24%
探偵学園Q	Tantei Gakuen Q	NTV	Tuesdays 22:00~22:54; 3 July 2007 to 11 September 2007	Ryunosuke Kamiki, Mirai Shida, Jun Kaname, Tarō Yamamoto, Takanori Jinnai, Ryosuke Yamada	FLOW "Answer" the brilliant green "Stand by me"	11	11.1%
地獄の沙汰もヨメ次第	Jigoku no Sada mo Yome Shidai	TBS	Thursday 21:00~21:54; 5 July 2007 to 13 September 2007	Makiko Esumi, Yōko Nogiwa, Ikki Sawamura, Nana Katase, Miho Shiraishi, Noriko Aota	ayaka "CLAP & LOVE"	10	10.3%
女帝	Jotei	TV Asahi	Fridays 21:00~21:54; 13 July 2007 to 14 September 2007	Rosa Kato, Shota Matsuda	Nanamusica "彼方" (Kanata)	10	14.4%

== 2007 fall season ==
Series

Japanese Title	Romaji Title	TV Station	Time Frame	Starring Actors	Theme Song(s)	Episodes	Average Ratings
おいしいごはん 鎌倉・春日井米店	Oishii Gohan Kamakura・Kasugai Kometen	TV Asahi	Thursdays 21:00–21:54; 25 October 2007 to 13 December 2007	Tetsuya Watari, Norika Fujiwara, Satoshi Tokushige	COLOR "青い鳥" (Aoi Tori)	8	9.0%
オトコの子育て	Otoko no Kosodate	TV Asahi	Fridays 21:00~21:54; 26 October 2007 to 14 December 2007	Katsunori Takahashi, Ryoko Kuninaka, Kotaro Koizumi	w-inds. "Beautiful Life"	8	8.6%
モップガール	Mop Girl	TV Asahi	Fridays 23:15–24:10; 12 October 2007 to 14 December 2007	Keiko Kitagawa, Shosuke Tanihara	Erika Sawajiri "Destination Nowhere"	10	10.16%
ガリレオ	Galileo	Fuji TV	Mondays 21:00~21:54; 15 October 2007 to 17 December 2007	Masaharu Fukuyama, Ko Shibasaki	KOH+ "KISSして" (KISS Shite)	10	21.9%
暴れん坊ママ	Abarenbou Mama	Fuji TV	Tuesdays 21:00~21:54; 16 October 2007 to 18 December 2007	Aya Ueto, Yo Oizumi	mihimaru GT "I SHOULD BE SO LUCKY"	10	12.4%
スワンの馬鹿!〜こづかい3万円の恋〜	Swan no Baka ~Kodzukai Sanman-en no Koi~	Fuji TV	Tuesdays 22:00–22:54; 16 October 2007 to 25 December 2007	Takaya Uekawa, Hiroki Narimiya, Hitori Gekidan	Harafuumi "夢を誓った木の下で" (Yume wo Chigatta Kinoshita)	11	8.3%
医龍-TEAM MEDICAL DRAGON-2	Iryu-TEAM MEDICAL DRAGON-2	Fuji TV	Thursdays 22:00~22:54; 11 October 2007 to 20 December 2007	Kenji Sakaguchi, Yuki Uchida, Teppei Koike, Kazuki Kitamura	AI "ONE"	11	16.65%
SP エスピー	SP (Security Police)	Fuji TV	Saturdays 23:10–23:55; 3 November 2007 to 12 January 2008	Junichi Okada, Shinichi Tsutsumi, Yōko Maki	V6 "way of life"	11	15.4%
有閑倶楽部	Yukan Club	NTV	Tuesdays 22:00~22:54; 16 October 2007 to 18 December 2007	Jin Akanishi, Yuu Yokoyama, Junnosuke Taguchi	KAT-TUN "Keep the faith"	10	12.63%
働きマン	Hataraki Man	NTV	Wednesdays 22:00~22:54; 10 October 2007 to 19 December 2007	Miho Kanno, Mocomichi Hayami	UVERworld "浮世CROSSING" (Ukiyo CROSSING)	11	12.0%
ドリーム☆アゲイン	Dream☆Again	NTV	Saturdays 21:00~21:54; 13 October 2007 to 15 December 2007	Takashi Sorimachi, Ai Kato, Mirai Shida	Kobukuro "蒼く 優しく" (Aoku Yasashiku)	10	10.25%
3年B組金八先生 8	San nen B-gumi Kinpachi Sensei Series 8	TBS	Thursday 21:00~21:54; 11 October 2007 to 27 March 2008	Taku Kamei, Yuuta Uekusa, Yuuma Sanada	Kaientai "いつか見た青い空" (Itsuka Mita Aoi Sora)	23	9.2%
ジョシデカ!-女子刑事-	Joshideka! -Joushi Keiji-	TBS	Thursdays 22:00~22:54; 18 October 2007 to 20 December 2007	Yukie Nakama, Pinko Izumi	Aqua Timez "小さな掌" (Chiisana Tenohira)	10	9.1%
歌姫	Utahime	TBS	Fridays 22:00~22:54; 12 October 2007 to 21 December 2007	Tomoya Nagase, Saki Aibu	TOKIO "青春 (SEISYuN)"	11	8.3%
ハタチの恋人	Hatachi no Koibito	TBS	Sunday 21:00~21:54; 14 October 2007 to 16 December 2007	Sanma Akashiya, Masami Nagasawa, Takashi Tsukamoto	The Pipettes "恋ってカンジ!?" (Koitte Kanji!?)	10	8.14%

== See also ==
- List of Japanese television dramas
