= Sheila (model) =

- Born: January 16, 1973 (age 53); Cuba
- Occupations: Model, entertainer, sportscaster, actress
- Agent: Horipro
- Height: 1.64 m (5 ft 5 in) (2009)
- Children: 2

Sheila (stylized as SHEILA; born January 16, 1973, in Cuba) is a Japanese model, entertainer, sportscaster and actress who is represented by Horipro.

== Filmography ==
=== TV series ===
Regular appearances

Title	Network	Notes
Bonita! Bonita!!: Nagoya Girls Collection	TVA	

Quasi-regular appearances

Title	Network	Notes
Ta Kajin Mune-ippai	KTV	
Akko ni Omakase!	TBS	

Occasional appearances

Title	Network	Notes
London Hearts	TV Asahi	

Past appearances

Year	Title	Network	Notes
2001	Spain-go Kaiwa	NHK E TV	MC
2006	Radio de Culture	NTV	Wednesday appearances
	World Business Satellite	TV Tokyo	Reporter
	Ongaku no DNA	TVK	
	Guru wa pi!	TV Tokyo	Regular appearances
	SportsCenter	Sports-i ESPN	Caster
	MLB Navi	SKY PerfecTV!	Regular appearances
	MLB Extra Inning	SKY PrefecTV!	Regular appearances
	Ren'ai nō °C	BS-TBS	Regular appearances
	The QuizMan	TV Asahi	
2008	Pretty Woman	TV Asahi	Moderator
	J-Spo	TBS	
	Megami no Antenna	TV Asahi	
	Raion no Gokigen yō	Fuji TV	Guest
2010	Furuta no Hōteishiki	TV Asahi	Guest

==== Dramas ====
Title	Network	Notes
Kekkon Dekinai Otoko	KTV	

=== Radio series ===
Year	Title	Network	Notes
2003	au Music Fiesta: From KDDI Designing Studio	Bay FM	
2009	Animo!	FM Yokohama	
	Honda Smile Mission	Tokyo FM, JFN	
	Bay Line 7300	Bay FM, Nack5, FM Yokohama	
2014	Sports Discovery from Tokyo Skytree Town Studio	NCB	
