= Kwak Hyun-hwa =

South Korean actress

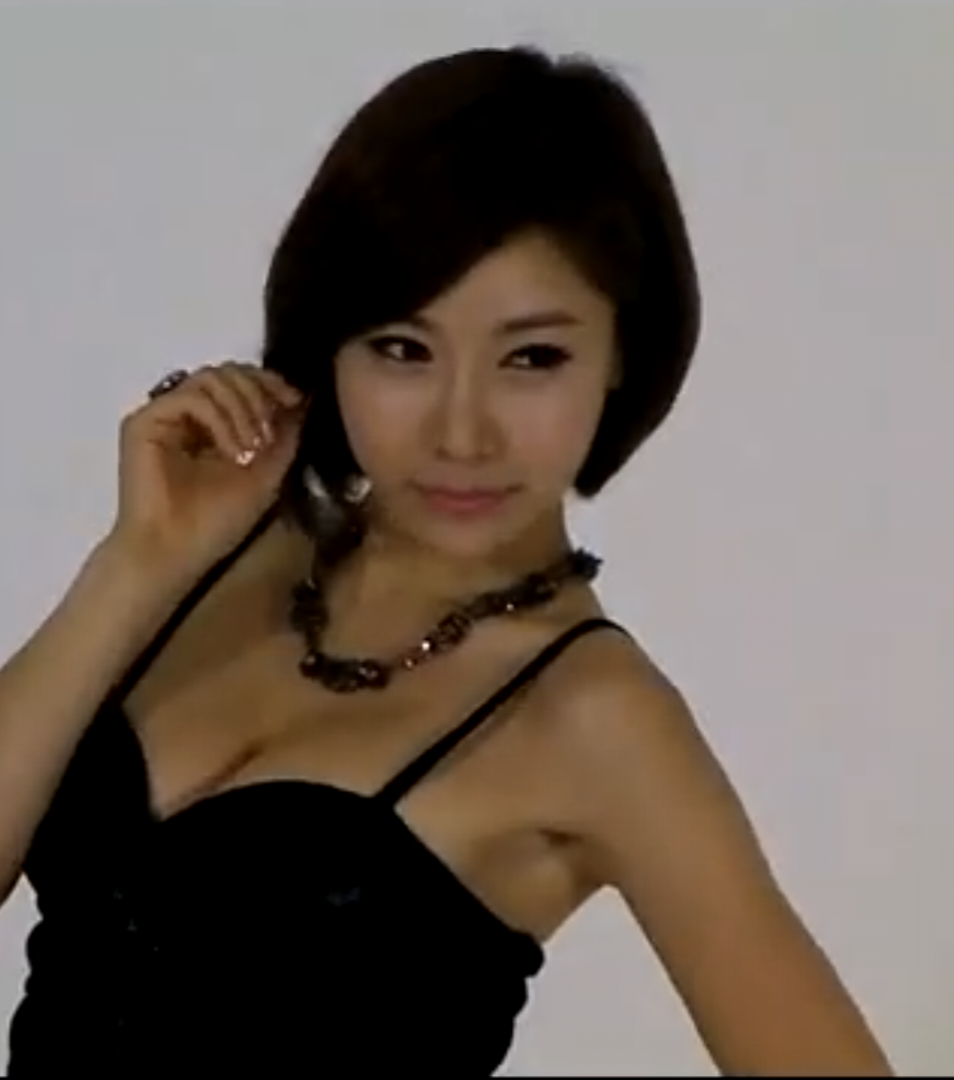
- Kwak in June 2012
- Born: March 2, 1981 (age 45); Busan, South Korea
- Education: Ewha Womans University – Bachelor of Mathematics
- Occupations: Actress; comedian; singer; model
- Years active: 2008–present

Korean name
- Hangul: 곽현화
- Hanja: 郭玄和
- RR: Gwak Hyeonhwa
- MR: Kwak Hyŏnhwa

Kwak Hyun-hwa (Korean: 곽현화; born March 2, 1981) is a South Korean actress, comedian, model and singer.

== Early life ==
Kwak Hyun-hwa was born on 2 March 1981 in Busan, South Korea. She graduated from Ewha Womans University with a bachelor's degree in Mathematics.

== Career ==
In 2011, Kwak appeared in UV's "Tralala" music video on November 19.

In 2012, she appeared in the movie House With a Good View as Mi-yeon.

In 2013, Kwak was cast in the movie Playboy Bong as herself.

== Filmography ==
=== Television series ===
Year	Title	Role	Notes
2008	You Are My Destiny	Ho-se's employee	
2008	Star's Lover	Lee Eun-shil (이은실)	
2009	He Who Can't Marry	Matthew Jeong's lover	Cameo
2010	The Fugitive: Plan B	Gee-woo's office secretary	Cameo
2011	Bravo, My Love!	Na-young (나영)	Cameo

=== Films ===
Year	Title	Role	Notes
2012	House With A Good View	Mi-yeon (미연)	
2013	Playboy Bong	Kwak Hyun-hwa (곽현화)	

== Discography ==
- Psycho (June 28, 2010)

== Bibliography ==
- Goddess of Mathematics (수학의 여신; Published on 6 February 2011; ISBN 9788964560433)
