= Yang Jung-a =

South Korean actress (born 1971)

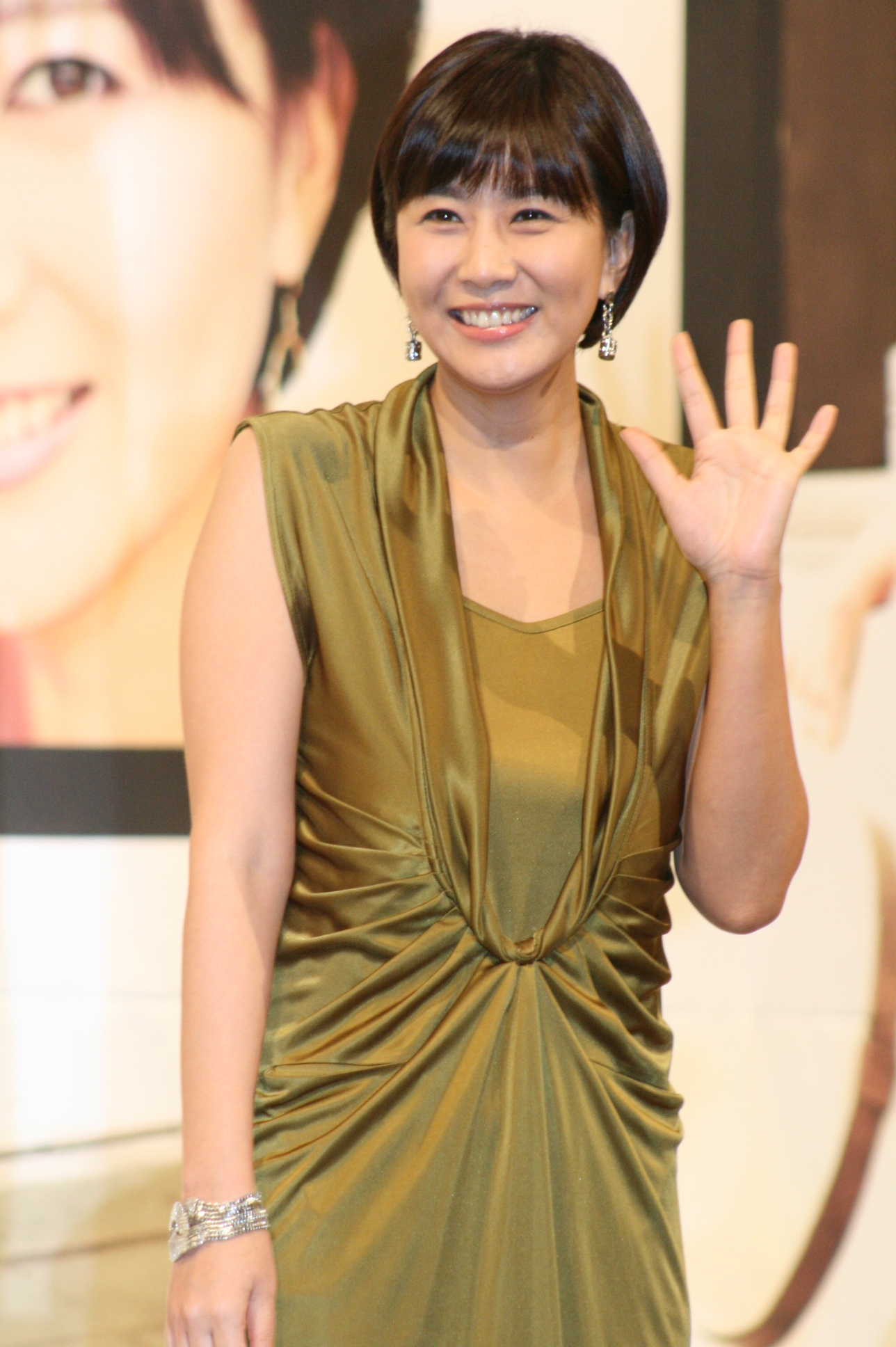
- Yang in 2009
- Born: July 25, 1971 (age 55); South Korea
- Occupation: Actress
- Years active: 1992–present
- Agent: Great Company
- Spouse: Unknown (m. 2013–2017)

Korean name
- Hangul: 양정아
- Hanja: 梁瀞疋
- RR: Yang Jeonga
- MR: Yang Chŏnga

Yang Jung-a (Korean: 양정아; born July 25, 1971) is a South Korean actress. Aside from starring in television dramas such as Here Comes Ajumma (2006) and He Who Can't Marry (2009), Yang gained popularity when she appeared in Gold Miss Is Coming, a matchmaking show for eligible female celebrities.

== Filmography ==
=== Film ===
Year	Title	Role	Ref.
2008	My Wife Got Married	Noh Deok-joo (cameo)	
2011	In Love and War	Woman from Suwon	

=== Television series ===
Year	Title	Role	Ref.
1993	Our Paradise		
1994	Ambition		
1994	General Hospital	Oh Bang-hee	
1994	M	Lee Ye-ji	
1995	Truth	Ha-young	
1996	Lover		
1996	Sometimes Like Strangers	Jung-eun	
1999	School 2	Korean language teacher Na Min-joo	
1999	Cello	Yoon Soo-kyung	
2000	Pardon	Min Ji-soo	
2002	Affection	Joo Ji-sun	
2003	Escape from Unemployment	Jo Chang-mi	
2003	One Million Roses	Seo Yoo-kyung	
2004	Wives on Strike	Yang Pil-soon	
2005	A Farewell to Sorrow	Oh Hee-sook	
2006	I'll Go with You	Min-jung	
2006	Here Comes Ajumma	Na Oh-nim	
2007	The King and I	Lady Oh, Kim Cheo-sun's mother	
2008	Mom's Dead Upset	Kyung-hwa	
2008	Glass Castle	Oh Yoo-ran	
2009	He Who Can't Marry	Yoon Ki-ran	
2011	Romance Town	Seo Yoon-joo	
2012	My Husband Got a Family	Bang Il-sook	
2015	Flower of Queen	Jung Hee-yeon	
2015	The Merchant: Gaekju 2015	Bang-geum	
2017	Band of Sisters	Lee Gye-hwa	
2022	Love in Contract	Choi Ran-hee	
2024	The Brave Yong Su-jeong	Lee Young-Ae	

=== Television shows ===
Year	Title	Notes	Ref.
2008–2010	Gold Miss Is Coming	Cast member	
2014–present	Good Morning	Host	
2020	King of Mask Singer	Contestant as "Blue Tissue Paper" (episode 265)	

== Radio ==
Year	Title	Ref.
2010–2013	Sweet Night with Yang Jung-a	

== Awards and nominations ==
Name of the award ceremony, year presented, category, nominee of the award, and the result of the nomination
Award ceremony	Year	Category	Nominee / Work	Result	Ref.
KBS Drama Awards	2007	Excellence Award, Actress in a Daily Drama	Here Comes Ajumma	Nominated	
KBS Drama Awards	2009	Best Supporting Actress	He Who Can't Marry	Nominated	
Korea Drama Awards	2007	Special Award	Here Comes Ajumma	Won	
Miss Korea Pageant	1990	Miss Seoul – Representative	Yang Jung-a	Nominated	
SBS Drama Awards	2009	Best Supporting Actress in a Serial Drama	Glass Castle	Nominated	
SBS Entertainment Awards	2008	Best Newcomer in a Variety Show	Gold Miss Is Coming	Won	
SBS Entertainment Awards	2009	Producer's Choice – TV Star Award	Gold Miss Is Coming	Won	
