= Kekkon Dekinai Otoko =

Japanese TV series

- Genre: Drama
- Directed by: Yoshishige Miyake; Takashi Komatsu; Hisashi Ueda
- Starring: Hiroshi Abe
- Country of origin: Japan
- Original language: Japanese
- No. of episodes: 12

Production
- Production companies: Kansai TV; Media Mix Japan

Original release
- Network: Kansai Television
- Release: July 4 – September 19, 2006

Kekkon Dekinai Otoko (結婚できない男), known in English as The Man Who Can't Get Married, is a 2006 Japanese drama broadcast by Fuji TV. Originally consisting of one season, the show eventually received a direct sequel 13 years later called as The Man Who Can't Get Married Yet (まだ結婚できない男, Mada Kekkon Dekinai Otoko) and broadcast from October 8 to December 10, 2019.

The theme song is "Swimmy" by Every Little Thing. The drama was produced by Kansai Telecasting Corporation and Media Mix Japan.

In 2009, the program was remade in South Korea as He Who Can't Marry.

== Plot ==
=== Kekkon Dekinai Otoko ===
Shinsuke Kuwano (Hiroshi Abe), a successful architect at 40, enjoys living by himself. He does not like people but somehow is able to design wonderful houses for them.

Kuwano is incredibly socially awkward, to the point of being rude, however, he often means well, and is generally at a loss as to why he annoys people around him (which he does consistently). While he is a loner, he has regular contact with his family, his mother in particular is trying to get him married. His day to day contact with his long suffering employee Eiji (Tsukamoto Takashi) and business manager Maya Sawazaki (Reiko Takashima) is troublesome, they see him as awkward, but as he is the core talent of the business, they put up with his antisocial ways. This generally involves them placating clients and trying to cover for the fact he sometimes insults them without even realising it.

He has a routine of making himself a delicious dinner and then relaxing to classical music in his easy chair (he likes to pretend that he is the conductor). One night, he plays the music loud enough to make his next door neighbor, Michiru Tamura (Ryōko Kuninaka) knock on his door to complain. When Kuwano answers the door, he suffers terrible stomach pain and collapses to the floor. Lucky for him, his neighbor Michiru is nice enough to accompany him to the hospital, where he is treated by Dr. Natsumi Hayasaka (Yui Natsukawa). He is really rude to Natsumi, but she is still determined to treat him.

Afterwards, Michiru and Natsumi become part of Kuwano's life. They make friends with Kuwano's colleagues Eiji and Maya. While becoming friends they all enjoy talking about how strange and eccentric Kuwano is. As time goes by, they all see something in Kuwano, while Kuwano himself changes his habits and starts to slowly appreciate the people around him.

Additionally Kuwano has a rival architect, Kaneda, whom he despises, though he seems interested in his extravagant lifestyle. Kaneda, only seem to use the cover of an architect as a cover to get girls and impress people. This intrigues Kuwano, who constantly checks his website to see if Kaneda actually builds anything. Kaneda is an architect like Kuwano, and around the exact age, they are polar opposites.

== Episodes ==
=== Kekkon Dekinai Otoko ===
	Episode title	Episode title (EN translation)	Broadcast date	Ratings
Ep. 1	一人が好きで悪いか!!	What's Wrong With Being a Loner?!!	July 4, 2006	20.2%
Ep. 2	好きなものを食って悪いか!!	What's Wrong With Eating Whatever I Want?!!	July 11, 2006	14.4%
Ep. 3	好きにお金を使って悪いか!!	What's Wrong With Spending Money However I Please?!!	July 18, 2006	15.9%
Ep. 4	休日を一人で過ごして悪いか!!	What's Wrong With Spending My Days Off Alone?!!	July 25, 2006	16.5%
Ep. 5	家に人を入れないで悪いか!!	What's Wrong With Not Letting Anyone Come Inside My House?!!	August 1, 2006	15.1%
Ep. 6	融通きかなくて悪いか!!	What's Wrong With Being Inflexible?!!	August 8, 2006	14.4%
Ep. 7	親戚づきあいが嫌いで悪いか!!	What's Wrong With Hating Being Around My Family?!	August 15, 2006	15.3%
Ep. 8	犬がキライで悪いか!!	What's Wrong With Hating Dogs?!!	August 22, 2006	14.6%
Ep. 9	彼女ができて悪いか!!	What's Wrong with Having a Girlfriend?!!	August 29, 2006	18.0%
Ep. 10	女ごころがわからなくて悪いか!!	What's Wrong With Not Understanding A Woman's Heart?!!	September 5, 2006	17.6%
Ep. 11	花柄がキライで悪いか!!	What's Wrong With Hating Floral Prints?!!	September 12, 2006	19.2%
Ep. 12	幸せになって悪いか!?	What's Wrong With Being Happy!?	September 19, 2006	22.0%

=== Mada Kekkon Dekinai Otoko ===
	Episode title	Episode title (EN translation)	Broadcast date	Ratings
Ep. 1	相変わらず一人が好きで悪いか!!	Is it bad that I still like being alone?!!	October 8, 2019	11.5%
Ep. 2	婚活アプリで知り合って悪いか!!	Is it bad to meet someone on a dating app?!!	October 15, 2019	7.7%
Ep. 3	若い女優とウワサになって悪いか!!	Is it bad to be rumored to be dating a young actress?!!	October 22, 2019	10.0%
Ep. 4	母親とケンカして悪いか!!	Is it wrong to fight with your mother?!!	October 29, 2019	9.5%
Ep. 5	神様にお願い事して悪いか!!	Is it wrong to make a wish to God?!!	November 5, 2019	10.0%
Ep. 6	見た目で判断して悪いか!!	Is it wrong to judge by appearances?!!	November 12, 2019	8.9%
Ep. 7	カフェが好きで悪いか!!	What's wrong with liking cafes?!!	November 19, 2019	8.5%
Ep. 8	結婚を祝わなくて悪いか!!	Is it wrong to not celebrate a marriage?!!	November 26, 2019	8.6%
Ep. 9	偏屈男が素直になって悪いか!!	What's wrong with a cranky guy being honest?!!	December 3, 2019	9.0%
Ep. 10	幸せになりたくて悪いか!!	Is it bad to want to be happy?!!	December 10, 2019	9.7%

== Credits ==
=== Kekkon Dekinai Otoko cast ===
- Hiroshi Abe - Shinsuke Kuwano: the protagonist.
- Yui Natsukawa - Natsumi Hayasaka: physician, Shinsuke's personal doctor.
- Ryoko Kuninaka - Michiru Tamura: Shinsuke's neighbor, living in Shinsuke's next door which her uncle owns with her own pug "Ken", during her uncle's long absence overseas.
- Takashi Tsukamoto - Eiji Murakami: Shinsuke's assistant.
- Reiko Takashima - Maya Sawazaki: Shinsuke's friend as well as his job partner as an architect producer.
- SHEILA - Chizuru Nishimura: Michiru's friend, who always looks for boyfriends.
- Yuko Nishimaru - Mari Ozawa: A nurse working under Natsumi, whom Natsumi named as "in charge of smiles".
- Iku Takamatsu - Kazumi Emori: A nurse working under Natsumi.
- Rieko Miura - Keiko Nakagawa: Shinsuke's younger sister.
- Toshinori Omi - Yoshio Nakagawa: Shinsuke's brother-in-law (Keiko's husband), VP of the hospital Natsumi is working for.
- Sakura - Saori Yoshikawa: Eiji's girlfriend, working for Maya's office.
- Noboru Takachi - Hiroyuki Kaneda: An architect whom Shinsuke regards as a rival, owns a Toyota 2000GT, also a womanizer.
- Mitsuko Kusabue - Ikuyo Kuwano: Shinsuke's mother.
- Ayano Tachibana - Convenience store cashier.
- Hiroyuki Nishio - Video rental shop cashier.
- Mansaku Fuwa - Master carpenter.

=== Mada Kekkon Dekinai Otoko cast ===
- Hiroshi Abe - Shinsuke Kuwano: the protagonist.
- Yō Yoshida - Madoka Yoshiyama: lawyer.
- Mai Fukagawa - Saki Tonami: Shinsuke's neighbor.
- Izumi Inamori - Yukie Tanaka: cafe manager.
- Takashi Tsukamoto - Eiji Murakami: Shinsuke's architectural partner.
- Rieko Miura - Keiko Nakagawa: Shinsuke's younger sister.
- Toshinori Omi - Yoshio Nakagawa: Shinsuke's brother-in-law (Keiko's husband).
- Mitsuko Kusabue - Ikuyo Kuwano: Shinsuke's mother.
- Mansaku Fuwa - Master carpenter.
- David Ito - Yakumaru: works out at the same gym as Shinsuke.

== Awards ==
Year	Award	Category	Recipients	Result
2006	50th Television Drama Academy Awards	Best Drama		Won
2006	50th Television Drama Academy Awards	Best Actor	Hiroshi Abe	Won
2006	50th Television Drama Academy Awards	Best Supporting Actress	Yui Natsukawa	Won
2006	50th Television Drama Academy Awards	Best Screenplay	Masaya Ozaki	Won
2006	50th Television Drama Academy Awards	Best Director	Yoshishige Miyake, Takashi Komatsu, Hisashi Ueda	Won
