= He Who Can't Marry (South Korean TV series) =

2009 South Korean television series

- Promotional poster
- Also known as: The Man Who Can't Get Married; The Man Who Can't Get Hitched
- Hangul: 결혼 못하는 남자
- Hanja: 結婚 못하는 男子
- RR: Gyeolhon mothaneun namja
- MR: Kyŏrhon mothanŭn namja
- Based on: Kekkon Dekinai Otoko by Masaya Ozaki
- Written by: Yeo Ji-na
- Directed by: Kim Jung-gyu
- Starring: Ji Jin-hee; Uhm Jung-hwa; Kim So-eun; Yoo Ah-in; Yang Jung-a
- Theme music composer: Yoon Hee-sung
- Country of origin: South Korea
- No. of episodes: 16

Production
- Executive producers: Bae Kyung-soo; Yoon Sin-ae; Ahn Young-min
- Producer: Lee Gang-hyun
- Cinematography: Eom Tae-man; Choi Chang-young; Shin Sung-il
- Editor: Lee Dong-hyun
- Running time: 60 minutes Mondays and Tuesdays at 21:55 (KST)
- Production companies: Apple Tree Production; Phoenix C&M

Original release
- Network: Korean Broadcasting System
- Release: June 15 – August 4, 2009

Related
- Kekkon Dekinai Otoko

He Who Can't Marry (Korean: 결혼 못하는 남자) is a 2009 South Korean television series starring Ji Jin-hee, Uhm Jung-hwa, Kim So-eun, Yoo Ah-in and Yang Jung-a. A romantic comedy about an extremely stubborn and inflexible 40-year-old bachelor, it is a remake of the 2006 Japanese drama Kekkon Dekinai Otoko.

== Plot ==
Architect Jae-hee (Ji Jin-hee) has the looks and the money, but he is over forty and still a bachelor. Despite being great marriage material on paper, his blunt personality and precise lifestyle turn women off. Jae-hee just cannot seem to get married—until he meets his equal, single 40-year-old doctor Moon-jung (Uhm Jung-hwa), who spends most of her time at work doing overtime and covering for colleagues. Romance may be in the air yet for the unmarriageable Jae-hee, but there's also his longtime colleague Ki-ran (Yang Jung-a) and young neighbor Yoo-jin (Kim So-eun) to consider.

== Cast ==
- Ji Jin-hee as Jo Jae-hee

A forty-year-old bachelor & Moon-jung's patient.

- Uhm Jung-hwa as Jang Moon-jung

A single doctor in her forties.

- Kim So-eun as Jeong Yoo-jin

Jae-hee's next door neighbor who has a dog named Sangu.

- Yoo Ah-in as Park Hyun-kyu

He works for Jae-hee and is interested in Yoo-jin.

- Yang Jung-a as Yoon Ki-ran

Jae-hee's partner in the firm.

- Im Ho as Park Kwang-nam

Jae-hee's brother-in-law.

- Kim Byung-ki as Jang Bong-soo

A dentist and Moon-jung's father.

- Yoo Tae-woong as Moon Seok-hwan

Jae-hee's most hated person.

- Bae Min-hee as Jo Yoon-hee

Kwang-nam's wife & Jae-hee's sister.

- Jeon Yang-ja as Kang Hye-ja

Jae-hee's mother.

- Jang Dan-ji as Kim Yeon-soo

Moon-jung's assistant/nurse.

- Choi Yoon-young as Yoo Soo-young

Yoo-jin's friend.

- Jang Jung-hee as Jo Yeong-shil, Bong-soo's dental assistant
- Lee Dal-hyung as foreman
- Seo Jun-young as Kim Tae-yeol, Yoo-jin's ex-boyfriend
- Kim Hye-mi as Tae-yeong, Moon-jung's assistant nurse
- Danji as Eun-hee, Moon-jung's assistant nurse
- Kim Yu-bin as rental shop clerk
- Sung Eun-chae as convenience store clerk
- Choi Sun-young as Park Ye-won, daughter of Kwang-nam & Yoon-hee
- Shin Pyo as stalker
- Kim Gun-mo as blind date guy (cameo, episode 1&8)
- Lee Jung-sub as fashion designer Matthew Jung (cameo, episode 1)
- Wink as singer (cameo, episode 1)
- Kwak Hyun-hwa as Mattew's wife (cameo, episode 1)
- Jeon Hye-bin as Lee Hwa-ran (cameo, episode 3, 6~8)

== Awards and nominations ==
| Year | Award | Category | Recipient | Result |
|---|---|---|---|---|
| 2009 | KBS Drama Awards | Top Excellence Award, Actor | Ji Jin-hee | Nominated |
| 2009 | KBS Drama Awards | Excellence Award, Actor in a Miniseries | Ji Jin-hee | Won |
| 2009 | KBS Drama Awards | Excellence Award, Actress in a Miniseries | Uhm Jung-hwa | Nominated |
| 2009 | KBS Drama Awards | Best Supporting Actress | Yang Jung-a | Nominated |
| 2009 | KBS Drama Awards | Best New Actor | Yoo Ah-in | Nominated |
| 2009 | KBS Drama Awards | Best New Actress | Kim So-eun | Won |
