= Age Harassment =

Japanese television drama series

Age Harassment (エイジハラスメント) is a 2015 Japanese TV drama series focusing on harassment in the modern Japanese workplace. It is based on the novel Age Harassment by Uchidate Makiko. It is produced by TV Asahi.

== Storyline ==
Yoshii Emiri (played by Emi Takei) is an attractive, intelligent university graduate from a rural town in Hokkaido, who has come to work in Tokyo. Her family has failed in their business, and because of this, she gave up her dream of going to the US to earn an MBA and has had to work hard to put herself through university. She attempts to join a large Japanese trading company's graduate program. She succeeds, but is surprised when she is assigned a position to the general affairs department in the section that deals with cleaning and maintenance. She even has to wear a uniform, while the men do not. However, the company is going through a cultural change where harassment in its various forms in the company are no longer being tolerated. This includes age harassment, sexual and "power harassment" (workplace bullying). Yoshi is not the typical quiet Japanese girl, she is prone to speaking her mind, sometimes when she possibly shouldn't. However, because of this she often speaks up and brings to attention various workplace issues that need to be dealt with. Her own manager (played by Inamori Izumi) sees her as a threat, though begins to respect her abilities. Because of this, some of her office workers respect her, while others see her as disruptive. Other women resent her because the male colleagues like her.

In order to survive, Yoshi has to navigate challenges of sexist management, older female management who see her as a threat, management policies, age discrimination, and friction with her fellow staff. She starts to fall for a manager from another section, Hoshina Akihiko (played by Koizumi Kotaro), not realising he is in fact in a secret relationship with her own manager, who discovers the relationship.

Apart from focusing on the drama associated with Yoshi specifically, the series addresses issues in modern Japanese business like work–life balance, paternity leave, including problems associated with the salaryman and office lady work culture.

== Cast ==
- Takei Emi as Yoshii Emiri
- Inamori Izumi as Osawa Yuriko
- Koizumi Kotaro as Hoshina Akihiko
- Ohkura Koji as Hiramoto Daisuke
- Seto Koji as Ikawa Yu
- Kaname Jun as Sada Koichi
- Naito Risa as Takahashi Mio
- Sugimoto Tetta as Ikura Masao
- Hara Mikie as Noda Mika
- Fukikoshi Mitsuru as Asano Makoto
- Asano Kazuyuki as Yoshii Takao
- Yumi Asō as Nakazato Keiko
- Takenaka Naoto as Takayama Tetsutaro
- Kazama Morio as Gondo Susumu
- Hirose Tomoki as Yamamoto
- Akizuki Mika as Eiko
- Airi Matsui as Shiono Rena
