= EM Embalming =

- Directed by: Shinji Aoyama
- Written by: Izo Hashimoto; Shinji Aoyama
- Based on: EM by Saki Amemiya
- Produced by: Katsuaki Takemoto; Satoru Ogura
- Starring: Reiko Takashima; Yutaka Matsushige; Seijun Suzuki; Toshio Shiba
- Cinematography: Ihiro Nishikubo
- Edited by: Soichi Ueno; Shinji Aoyama
- Music by: Isao Yamada; Shinji Aoyama
- Release date: July 31, 1999 (Japan)
- Running time: 96 minutes
- Country: Japan
- Language: Japanese

EM Embalming (Japanese: EM エンバーミング, Hepburn: EM Enbāmingu) is a 1999 Japanese horror film directed by Shinji Aoyama, starring Reiko Takashima.

== Cast ==
- Reiko Takashima as Miyako Murakami
- Yutaka Matsushige as Detective Hiraoka
- Seijun Suzuki as Kurume
- Toshio Shiba as Dr. Fuji
- Kojiro Hongo as Jion
- Hitomi Miwa as Rika Shinohara
- Masatoshi Matsuo as Yoshiki Shingo

== Reception ==
Todd Brown of Twitch Film commented that Shinji Aoyama is creating a subtle parody of the Japanese horror film industry. Stina Chyn of Film Threat noted that EM Embalming is one of the few Japanese horror films that contains actual non-creepy segments. Andy McKeague of Monsters and Critics felt that the film is genuinely unsettling and morbidly fascinating at the same time.

Mike Bracken of IGN criticized the film, saying that EM Embalming's greatest failure is that it often tries to be too many things at once and the film itself is almost as schizophrenic as its antagonist. However, he felt that several sequences of the embalming process are gruesome and extended conversations between Miyako and the black market organ harvester are eerily intriguing.

Meanwhile, Mark Schilling of The Japan Times said: "While verging on a black comic turn, Toshio Shiba's performance as Dr. Fuji is the film's strongest; his dark night of the soul is not just another fashionably blank attitude, but the genuine article, forged in the satanic mills of anger, loathing and despair."
