= Damens Walker =

Japanese manga essay series by Mayumi Kurata

だめんず・うぉ～か～ (Damenzu Uōkā)
- Manga
- Written by: Mayumi Kurata
- Published by: Fusosha
- Imprint: Spa! Comics
- Magazine: Weekly Spa!
- Original run: June 14, 2000 – April 2013
- Volumes: 20
- Television drama
- Original network: NTV
- Original run: March 1, 2002 – March 29, 2002
- Episodes: 5
- Television drama
- Original network: TV Asahi
- Original run: October 12, 2006 – December 7, 2006
- Episodes: 8

Damens Walker (Japanese: だめんず・うぉ～か～, Hepburn: Damenzu Uōkā) is a Japanese manga essay series by Mayumi Kurata. Damens Walker was serialized in the weekly magazine Weekly Spa! from June 14, 2000, to April 2013. The series has inspired two live-action television drama adaptations and a mobile anime series.

== Synopsis ==
Damens Walker follows the dating life of a woman who is only interested in good-for-nothing men, known as "damens" (だめんず) (a combination of the words "good-for-nothing" (ダメ, dame) and "men").

== Media ==
=== Manga ===
Damens Walker is written and illustrated by Mayumi Kurata. It was serialized in the weekly magazine Weekly Spa! beginning on June 14, 2000, to April 2013. The chapters were later released in twenty bound volumes by Fusosha under the Spa! Comics imprint.

Kurata stated that her reason for ending the manga was not because of problems in her marriage, but because she had "lost frustration towards good-for-nothing men" and that her older age has changed her perspective on relationships.

No.	Japanese release date	Japanese ISBN
1	July 26, 2001	978-4-5940-3207-4
2	December 19, 2001	978-4-5940-3350-7
3	February 28, 2002	978-4-5940-3428-3
4	November 15, 2002	978-4-5940-3718-5
5	July 2, 2003	978-4-5940-4101-4
6	December 2, 2003	978-4-5940-4219-6
7	July 13, 2004	978-4-5940-4692-7
8	April 28, 2005	978-4-5940-4945-4
9	November 25, 2005	978-4-5940-5066-5
10	April 20, 2006	978-4-5940-5146-4
11	September 29, 2006	978-4-5940-5220-1
12	July 27, 2007	978-4-5940-5411-3
13	February 14, 2008	978-4-5940-5594-3
14	September 27, 2008	978-4-5940-5776-3
15	April 11, 2009	978-4-5940-5931-6
16	April 30, 2010	978-4-5940-6186-9
17	January 28, 2011	978-4-5940-6339-9
18	September 30, 2011	978-4-5940-6490-7
19	May 11, 2012	978-4-5940-6606-2
20	July 2, 2013	978-4-5940-6855-4

=== Television drama ===
==== 2002 adaptation ====
Damens Walker was adapted into a live-action television drama starring Ai Ijima and Chiaki Hara, which was broadcast on NTV from March 1 to March 29, 2002.

==== 2006 adaptation ====
A second live-action television drama starring Norika Fujiwara and Yu Yamada was broadcast on TV Asahi from October 12 to December 7, 2006. The theme song for the 2006 adaptation is "Yume no Uta" by Koda Kumi. "Trans-winter (Fuyu no Mukōgawa)" by Showta was featured as an insert song.

No.	Title	Directed by	Written by	Original release date	Japan viewership rating (Kanto region)
1	"A Woman Who Can't Get Married vs Good-For-Nothing Man!!"; Transliteration: "Kekkon Dekinai Onna vs Dame Otoko!!" (Japanese: 結婚できない女vsダメ男!!)	Unknown	Unknown	October 12, 2006	10.3%
2	"A Good-For-Nothing Woman is into a Mother Complex Man!?"; Transliteration: "Mazakon Otoko ni Hamatta Dame Onna!?" (Japanese: マザコン男にハマッたダメ女!?)	Unknown	Unknown	October 19, 2006	8.0%
3	"A (Secret) Love Triangle with a Hot Beautician"; Transliteration: "Ikemen Biyōshi to no (Hi) Sankaku Kankei" (Japanese: イケメン美容師との（秘）三角関係)	Unknown	Unknown	November 2, 2006	7.2%
4	"A Hidden Secret in a Wedding Party"; Transliteration: "Kekkon Pātī ni Kakusareta Uso" (Japanese: 結婚パーティーに隠された嘘)	Unknown	Unknown	November 9, 2006	7.4%
5	"A Woman into the No. 1 Good-Looking Host!?"; Transliteration: "No. 1 Bikei Hosuto ni Hamatta Onna!?" (Japanese: No.1美形ホストにハマった女!?)	Unknown	Unknown	November 16, 2006	8.6%
6	"Tonight, a Reverse Proposal to a Celebrity Man"; Transliteration: "Konya Serebu Otoko ga Gyaku ni Puropōzu" (Japanese: 今夜セレブ男が遂にプロポーズ)	Unknown	Unknown	November 23, 2006	9.0%
7	"Final Chapter!! A Trap of Marrying into Wealth"; Transliteration: "Saishūshō!! Serebu Kon no Wana" (Japanese: 最終章!! セレブ婚の罠)	Unknown	Unknown	November 30, 2006	7.1%
8	"A Miracle on Christmas Eve!! A Tearful Wedding Announcement"; Transliteration: "Ibu no Kiseki!! Namida no Kekkon Sengen" (Japanese: イヴの奇跡!! 涙の結婚宣言…)	Unknown	Unknown	December 7, 2006	7.0%

=== Stage play ===
A stage play adaptation ran in 2006. A second stage play adaptation ran from October 30 to November 1, 2020.

=== Anime ===
A 12-episode anime adaptation titled Damens Walker: The Anime was released beginning March 1, 2010, with each episode having a run time of 3 minutes. The series was streamed weekly on Sundays on BeeTV for Docomo mobile phones. The theme song is "D-Woman", which was written and produced by Daimaou Kosaka and performed by his friend Masako Ohara.

=== Film ===
A live-action film titled Damens Walker: The Movie Jealousy Edition was released direct-to-video on May 2, 2018. The theme song is "Baby Call My Name" by Emi Nitta. Also included in the DVD is a talk show with Nobu Morimoto.

== Reception ==
In 2010, Damens Walker sold a cumulative total of 2 million physical copies.
