= Manabu Oshio =

Japanese former singer and actor (born 1978)

- Born: 押尾学; May 6, 1978 (age 48); Tokyo, Japan
- Origin: Tokyo, Japan
- Occupation: Singer-actor
- Instruments: Vocalist, lyricist, guitarist, composer
- Years active: 1997–present
- Labels: Universal Music, Tris Co.ltd
- Formerly of: L.I.V
- Website: www.myspace.com/manabuoshio

Manabu Oshio (押尾 学, Oshio Manabu; born May 6, 1978) is a Japanese former singer and actor. He is the former vocalist of the band LIV. He was convicted in 2011 of drug use and failing to provide assistance to an acquaintance who died after taking drugs he had provided her.

== History ==
Raised in Los Angeles, California, United States from age 4 to 12 before moving back to Tokyo, Japan, Oshio writes his lyrics in English and Japanese. He has held many starring roles in TV shows, dramas, commercials, and movies in Japan as well as in China.

Oshio made his acting debut in 1997 in Ai, Tokidoki Uso. Later Oshio formed his band LIV in 2002. Their first single Without You was released in January and their debut album "The First Chapter" was later released in October of the same year. Their second single Try was released in May and went to number 1 on the Oricon charts.

Oshio continued over the next 3 years juggling acting, performing live and releasing albums under his band Liv. His last studio album on Universal Japan was "Mi Vida Loca", shortly after his departure from Universal his singles collection was released "Coleccion de Oro".

Reports Announced that on October 4, 2005, Oshio was quitting acting to pursue his musical career. He quit his management agency and joined indie label Daiki Sound. Oshio's last drama was Satomi Hakkenden . In 2006 he married Akiko Yada.

Oshio decided to make a return to acting in 2008. He signed to Avex Entertainment, citing that he would like to expand his international career and was happy with Avex Entertainment's global aims.

Announced in August 2008 that he was reviving his band LIV. In his own words the band is going to "start from zero". The band had introduced to new members and were said to be working on a new album.

Oshio Manabu was released from prison in 2014. In 2016, he appeared in a live event with LIV.

=== Court case ===
On August 2, 2009, he was arrested at Roppongi Hills for possession of MDMA during an investigation into the death of a hostess. He was subsequently dropped by Avex Entertainment for violating his contract and his music labels cancelled distribution of all his releases. After his arrest his wife Akiko Yada decided to file for divorce, citing "incompatible values"

His blog "Entertainment Crusher", which had been active since 2006, was also wiped off the web.

On December 7, 2009, he was arrested again by the Tokyo Metropolitan Police.

According to the police, Tanaka fell ill and her condition took a turn for the worse at around 6:30 p.m. Aug. 2 after taking the drug with Oshio. Oshio told Endo over the phone that she had not regained consciousness, and the manager arrived at around 7:40 p.m. An emergency call was made at 9:19 p.m. By the time paramedics arrived and confirmed her death at the scene at 9:27 p.m., Oshio had gone to another unit in the apartment building.

Oshio was convicted of giving the girl Ecstasy and neglecting to care for her after she fell gravely ill. He was sentenced to 30 months in prison, which was upheld by the Tokyo High Court on 18 April 2011. On 15 February 2012, the Supreme Court of Japan upheld Oshio's conviction. The decision meant that Oshio was required to consecutively serve both the 18-month sentence for drug use and the 30-month sentence in prison.

== Discography ==
=== Albums ===
- The First Chapter (2002)
- Skeleton Key (2003)
- Mi Vida Loca (2005)
- Coleccion de Oro BEST 2002–2005 (2005)
- Manifest (2007)

=== Singles ===
- Without You (2002)
- Try (2002)
- SOUL (2002)
- May I Be Happy Forever/FLY (2003)
- Are you Alive? (2003)
- FAKE STAR (2004)
- THE SHOW (2004)
- 未来の花 {Mirai no hana} (2005)
- LOVE YOUR LIFE (2006)
- キンモクセイ {kinmokusei} (2006)
- Me Against Myself (2007)
- Game(2007)

=== Collaboration ===
m.c.A.T

- Beastie Life feat. Manabu Oshio (2007)

=== DVD ===
- Clips One (2002)
- Clips Two (2003)
- LIV TOUR 2003 SKELETON KEY Live at Zepp Tokyo 2003.12.07 (2004)
- Clips Three (2005)
- El Documental de mi Vida Loca ～LIV TOUR 2005 Mi Vida Loca～(2006)

== Dramas ==
- Satomi Hakkenden (2006)
- Yume de Aimashou (2005)
- Rikon Bengoshi (SP) (2004)
- Kunimitsu no Matsuri (2003)
- Double Score (2002)
- Haru Ranman (2002)
- Love Revolution (2001)
- 2001 no otoko un (2001)
- Yamato Nadeshiko (2000)
- Hatachi no kekkon (2000)

=== Films ===
- Map of the Sounds of Tokyo (2009)
- Dakara oretachi wa, Asa wo matteita (2010)

=== Games ===
- Chaos Legion (2003)
