= Saya Yūki =

Japanese actress

Saya Yūki (悠城 早矢, Yūki Saya; April 9, 1988) is a Japanese actress. One of her major roles was that of Tsuyoshi, the protagonist of Sh15uya.

== TV series ==
- Hatsu Kare (2006)
- Dance Drill (2006)
- Machiben (2006)
- Gachi Baka (2006)
- Sh15uya (2005)

== Films ==
- Ao Zora No Yukue~Way Of Blue Sky (2005)
