= Shela (Japanese singer) =

shela
- Born: Megumi Ōizumi (大泉めぐみ); 4 March 1980 (age 46); Bibai, Hokkaido, Japan
- Genres: Japanese pop
- Occupations: Singer, actress
- Instruments: Vocals, saxophone
- Years active: 1999–present
- Labels: Tokuma Japan (1997–1998); Avex Trax (1999–2005); Rosso Records (2009)
- Website: avexnet.or.jp/shela/index.html/

Shela (シェラ) is a Japanese pop singer and actress made a debut under Avex Trax label. Before her career started, Shela was the lead vocalist and saxophonist of the three-member band FBI from 1997 to 1998. In 1999 she signed with Avex Trax, and embarked on a solo career. In 2004 she joined the band, Sunny-side Up, and split with the original line-up in 2005. As of 2009 Shela has made her comeback currently signed to the indie label Rosso Records.

== Single ==
- [1999.12.01] White
- [2000.04.26] Red
- [2000.10.18] purple
- [2001.02.15] orange
- [2001.05.03] sepia
- [2001.11.28] pink
- [2002.04.10] Rose
- [2002.09.19] Himawari
- [2003.01.22] Baby's breath
- [2003.04.16] cherry blossom
- [2003.06.25] Clover (クローバー)
- [2004.03.03] Tsuki to Taiyou (月と太陽)
- [2005.05.18] Dear my friends
- [2009.09.01] crystal

== Albums ==
- [2001.05.09] COLORLESS
- [2003.07.24] Garden
- [2005.07.06] COLORS single collection vol.1
- [2005.07.06] FLORAL single collection vol.2
