= Yume de Aimashou =

- Starring: Akiko Yada; Manabu Oshio; Yu Yamada
- Country of origin: Japan
- Original language: Japanese
- No. of episodes: 11

Original release
- Network: TBS
- Release: April 14 – June 23, 2005

Yume de Aimashou (夢で逢いましょう) is a 2005 Japanese television drama series.
