= Suppli =

Japanese manga series

- Manga
- Written by: Mari Okazaki
- Published by: Shodensha
- English publisher: NA: Tokyopop
- Magazine: Feel Young
- Original run: October 8, 2003 – November 7, 2009
- Television drama
- Produced by: Masayuki Sekiya
- Music by: Yugo Kanno
- Original network: Fuji TV
- Original run: July 10, 2006 – September 18, 2006
- Episodes: 11

Suppli (サプリ, Sapuri; lit. "Supplement") is a Japanese manga series written and illustrated by Mari Okazaki. It was published by Shodensha's josei manga magazine Feel Young from October 8, 2003, (Note: It was serialized from the November 2003 issue, released on October 8.) to November 7, 2009; a sidestory also ran in the magazine in 2010. It has been collected in seven volumes so far, and was published in English by Tokyopop who released five volumes in English. Suppli was adapted into a Japanese drama series which aired in Japan on Fuji TV in summer 2006. It stars Misaki Itō, Kazuya Kamenashi, Eita, and Miho Shiraishi.

Minami is a 27-year-old female office worker in an advertisement agency. Though she has a boyfriend, she spends the majority of her time working and appears to feel ambivalent about the relationship at best. When the boyfriend finally breaks up with her, it's the push she needs to start a social life with her co-workers. In-office romances soon follow. Much of the story is told through Minami's thoughts, which are full of self-doubt.

== Cast ==
- Minami Fuji – Misaki Itoh
- Yuya Ishida – Kazuya Kamenashi
- Satoshi Ogiwara – Eita
- Yoko Yugi – Miho Shiraishi
- Kunio Sakuragi – Kazuyuki Aijima
- Yuri Watanabe – Reina Asami
- Yoshihide Matsui – Akimasa Haraguchi (原口あきまさ)
- Keisuke Mita – Shigeyuki Sato
- Natsuki Konno – Mirai Shida
- Mizuho Tanaka – Ryo
- Kyotaro Imaoka – Kōichi Satō

=== Minor cast ===
- Konishiki in episode 1
- Nozomi Saito – Naomi Akimoto in episode 2
- Masako Umemiya in episode 4
- Shin Yanase – Mantaro Koichi in episode 5
- Mika Kazuki – Sayo Aizawa in episode 5
- Yumiko Hirano – Megumi Yokoyama in episode 7
- Isao Yatsu (谷津勲) in episode 8
- Shinshou Nakamaru in episode 10
- Kei Sunaga (須永慶) in episode 10
- Seiji Rokkaku in episode 11

== Reception ==
Suppli is regarded as being more realistic in its depiction of working life than Tramps Like Us or Happy Mania. Deb Aoki of About.com called it "refreshingly real", in contrast to shōjo manga stories. Nadia Oxford of Mania Entertainment regarded the first volume as being a "fairly standard romance novel" in manga format. Margaret O'Connell, writing for Sequential Tart, described Minami as suffering from "internalized misogyny", noting that she has no female support network.
