= Noriko Aota =

Japanese actress and singer

- 青田 典子
- Born: Noriko Morita; 7 October 1966 (age 59); Matsuyama, Ehime, Japan (Note: In her nominal profile before the C.C. Girls were formed, her birthday was 7 October 1966.)
- Other names: Noriko Tamaki (real name); Yoko Mori (森 陽子, Mori Yōko); Tenko (てんこ) (Note: It was because that C.C. Girls member Noriko Harada was nicknamed "Noriko".); Bubble Aota (バブル青田, Baburu Aota)
- Occupations: Tarento; actress; idol singer
- Style: Gravure
- Height: 164 cm (5 ft 5 in)
- Spouse: Unknown (m. 2004; div. 2005) Koji Tamaki (m. 2010)

Noriko Aota (青田 典子, Aota Noriko; born 7 October 1966) is a Japanese tarento, actress and former idol singer. She is known as a member of the idol group C.C. Girls. She is now represented by Great Den.

Aota's real name is Noriko Tamaki (玉置 典子, Tamaki Noriko), maiden name Morita (森田). She is married to the singer Koji Tamaki.

== Discography ==
=== As Tenko ===
==== Mini albums ====
Year	Title
2002	Namida

=== As Bubble Aota ===
==== Singles ====
Year	Title
2006	"Jesus"

==== DVD ====
Year	Title
2006	Awa Odori

=== E-books ===
Year	Title
2010	Beauty Bubble Diet

=== Photo albums ===
Year	Title	ISBN
1993	C.C. Girls vol. 1	ISBN 978-4063254044
1995	etrangre	ISBN 978-4821120727
1998	Noriko Aota: Shashin-shū	ISBN 978-4847024979
2000	xyz	ISBN 978-4894611801
2002	Glamorous Love	ISBN 978-4894616707
2003	aime-moi	ISBN 978-4893085429

== Filmography ==
=== Variety ===
Year	Title	Network	Notes
	London Hearts	TV Asahi	
1994	TV Idol: Bijo no Yakata	NTV	
2006	Utaban	TBS	As Bubble Aota
2006	SMAP×SMAP	KTV, Fuji TV	
2008	Renai Hyakkei	TV Asahi	Episode 91; special appearance
2008	The Triangle	TBS	
2009	Wakaru TV	Fuji TV	
2009	Otameshika'!	TV Asahi	
2009	Nep League	Fuji TV	
2009	5-Ji ni Muchū	Tokyo MX	

=== TV dramas ===
Year	Title	Role	Network	Notes
1996	Kirara		TV Asahi	Lead role
1997	Time Keepers		Fuji TV	Guest lead
1999	Salaryman Kintarō	Kyoko Sakurai	TBS	
1999	Prison Hotel		TV Asahi	
1999	The Laughing Salesman		TV Asahi	Episode 9; guest
1999	Again: Love Song o Mōichido	Rika Tojo	CBC	
2000	Haregi koko Ichiban	Keiko	NHK	
2000	Tax Inspector Madogiwa Taro: Case File 5		TBS	
2000	Anrakuisu Tantei no Seiya: Kieta Teddy Bear no Nazo	Kyoko Tamura	ABC	
2001	Miyamoto Musashi	Shino	TV Tokyo	
2001	Kyoto Maru Hi Shigoto Hito		ABC	
2002	Pretty Girl		TBS	Episode 2; guest
2002	Hatchōbori no Nana-ri		TV Asahi	Episode 9; guest
2002	Artificial Beauty	Aio Hoshihara	Fuji TV	
2002	Shin Ai no Arashi	Kotoko	THK	
2002	Inspector Totsugawa Series 26 Tokkyū aozo-ra Satsujin Jiken	Ayako Mori, Kaori Yuki	TBS	Dual role
2003	Anata no Jinsei o Hakobi shimasu		TBS	Episode 2; guest
2004	Igiari! Onna Bengoshi Norie Ooka	Atsumi Hattori	TV Asahi	
2004	Zenigata Heiji		TV Asahi	Episode 2; guest
2004	Orange Days		TBS	Episode 7; guest
2005	Kyotaro Nishimura Travel Mystery Tokkyū Super Hokuto 1-gō Satsujin Jiken	Harumi Kozakai	TV Asahi	
2005	Karuizawa Mystery		NTV	
2005	Itsuka, Niji no Mukō e		TV Tokyo	
2005	Kyoto Minami-sho Kanshiki File	Himeka Nijo	TV Asahi	
2007	Kodoku no Kake: Ashiki Hitoyo	Tokieda Kurosawa	TBS	
2007	Jigoku no Sata mo Yome Shidai	Masami Shinozuka	TBS	
2007	Dream Again	Momoko Ushiyama	NTV	
2007	Go Kinjo Tantei Satsuki Tsukino	Sonoko Dobotoke	TBS	
2008	Mama no Kamisama	Sayuri Nakai	CBC	Lead role
2008	Tsujitsuma: Magenta ni Kiwotsukero	Magenta Kumiko	TV Asahi	
2009	Q.E.D. Shōmei Shūryō	Sachiyo Nagisa	NHK-G	
2009	Call Center no Koibito	Mayumi Fukumoto	TV Asahi	Episode 8; guest
2010	Hanchō: Jinnan-sho Asaka Han	Keiko	TBS	Episode 10; guest
2010	Seicho Matsumoto Drama Special Kiri no Hata	Noriko Masuda	NTV	

=== Internet ===
Year	Title	Website
2006	Love Colle: Tokyo Love Collection	GyaO
2006	Go! Go! Gyao	GyaO

=== Films ===
Year	Title	Role	Notes
1991	Sakana kara Dioxin!!		
1995	Joshū Shokei Hito Maria		Lead role
1996	Haitoku no Megami Series: Poison		Lead role
1997	Natsujikan no Otona-tachi Happy-Go-Lucky		
2001	D.O.A II		
2001	Rush		
2002	Cross Up!		
2003	Nami-shō no Yamamoto ja!		
2005	Shin Nihon no Shuryō II	Yuka Fujiki	
2006	7 Tsuki 24-nichi-dōri no Christmas		
2006	Mach Racer		
2008	Sundome	Herself	
