= Shibuya Fifteen =

- Also known as: Shibuya Fifteen
- Genre: Action; Suspense; Science fiction
- Directed by: Nobuhiro Suzuki; Ryuta Tasaki
- Starring: Saya Yūki; Yui Aragaki; Yuria Haga
- Country of origin: Japan
- Original language: Japanese
- No. of episodes: 12

Production
- Producers: Kazuo Katō; Kōichi Yada; Naomi Takebe; Saeko Matsuda; Shinichiro Shirakura
- Running time: 23 minutes

Original release
- Network: TV Asahi
- Release: January 10 – March 28, 2005

Shibuya Fifteen (シブヤフィフティーン, Shibuya Fifutīn; stylized as Sh15uya) is a Japanese television drama that premiered on TV Asahi on January 10, 2005. It ran for 12 episodes until its conclusion on March 10, 2005. Set in a virtual simulation of Shibuya, Tokyo which is regulated by an entity named Piece which does not allow inhabitants to live, the series focuses on a fifteen-year-old boy named Tsuyoshi who seeks to find both his lost memories and a way to escape Shibuya. To maintain control, Piece "kills" those who do not operate within the proper confines of the world, which results in their being reset and inserted back into the city with a new name and identity and without their previous memories.

The episodes are directed by Nobuhiro Suzuki and Ryuta Tasaki, using scripts written by Shoji Yonemura. Their soundtrack was composed by Kuniaki Haishima. A single volume manga adaptation, written and illustrated by Go Yabuki, was released by Kadokawa Shoten on July 1, 2005.

== Cast ==
- Saya Yūki as Tsuyoshi
- Yui Aragaki as Ema
- Yuria Haga as Asagi
- Toru Yamashita as Ryuugo
- Uehara Takuya as DJ
- Mao Kato as Mikio
- Tomohisa Yuge as Kengo
- Mitsuru Karahashi as Ootomo
- Mark Musashi as Piece
- Risa Ai as Haru
- Takashi Matsuyama as Igaya

== Episode list ==
No.	Title	Original release date
1	"Face.01 Fifteens" "Face.01 Fifutīnzu" (Face.01 フィフティーンズ)	January 10, 2005
Tsuyoshi wakes up amidst trash in the city of Shibuya with no recollection of the past, throwing up a note from Revu that says "escape Shibuya" (シブヤから出る). After exploring the city, he finds Asagi on Bunkamu territory being chased by them while in search for Chiko, a member of her gang. He helps her fight them off, but is parted with violently. Hearing during the fight that he belongs to the Palhands, Tsuyoshi searches for his group. After finding them, he learns that he is the Palhands gofer named Shouta. He finds out that it is Palhands is the one keeping Chiko hostage. Soon after, they are confronted by Lovegen. During the ensuing battle, Tsuyoshi helps Chiko escape. Chiko feeds him, but then chases him for his blood. However, Piece marks her and kills her; Ema then appears, summons armor, and defeats Piece. She tells Tsuyoshi that his real name is not Shouta.
2	"Face.02 Borderline" "Face.02 Bōdarainu" (Face.02 ボーダーライン)	January 17, 2005
After Ema and Piece's fight, Ryuugo passes Tsuyoshi off to Lovegen and leaves. Asagi takes him to Kengo's tattoo shop to have dinner and discuss the events that had just come to pass. There Asagi briefs Tsuyoshi on the three gangs' names, leaders, and territories. Asagi soon leaves for her part time job, forcing him to work off the bill for the meal. After staying the night, Tsuyoshi delivers Kengo's curry to Asagi, where she hears about her family. They decide to try to visit them, only to find out that they cannot leave Shibuya. Ryuugo plots getting rid of both Bunkamu and Lovegen by taking advantage of a fight he instigates between the two and keeping Piece at bay by making Ema his friend. Bunkamu takes on Asagi, but is interrupted when Piece appears, marking Asagi. However, Tsuyoshi confronts him, then recalling his true name, Tsuyoshi.
3	"Face.03 Runaway" "Face.03 Rannawei" (Face.03 ランナウェイ)	January 24, 2005
Ema drives Piece away but still does not open up to Tsuyoshi despite her surprise at the recollection of his name. Tsuyoshi tries to get Asagi to run away with him from Shibuya, but she refuses as doing so violates the rules of Shibuya. Tsuyoshi tries to run away twice, both times failing. Ryuugo reveals his plans to reach the top of Shibuya to Tsuyoshi and then brings him to Ema. He then decides to bring Asagi along with him regardless of her opinions; however, when he finds her, they soon meet Piece again. Although Ema intervenes again, Tsuyoshi ends up taking Piece's sword in the stomach for Asagi.
4	"Face.04 Hunting" "Face.04 Hantingu" (Face.04 ハンティング)	January 31, 2005
Ema defeats Piece. Asagi brings Tsuyoshi back to Kengo's shop to eat Katsudon and heal. There Lovegen confronts their old leader whom they call a yojire, one who is marked by Piece but not dead, in search of Ema. Ryuugo meets with Asagi, striking a deal with her where if she lures Ema into a trap, then he will help her return to her group in spite of the stigma associated with being a yojire. Ema appears at Kengo's shop accepting a job to paint nails which turns out to be a trap by Bunkamu. Tsuyoshi goes to check on her when she does not return and aids her in her escape. Asagi helps them run away, but they find out she betrayed them, luring them to an abandoned parking lot where all three gangs appear to ambush the two as per the deal. They end up fleeing to the boundary of Shibuya where Asagi has a change of heart. Ema works up enough resolve to perform Merge allowing them to run away. Tsuyoshi and Asagi end up staying at Kengo's shop for the night. Ryuugo is seen to be talking with the man who is implied to be in charge of the eye blimp, asking whether it is the right time to be rid of Bunkamu.
5	"Face.05 Deathtrap" "Face.05 Desutorappu" (Face.05 デストラップ)	February 7, 2005
Through this episode, Piece asks various questions related to history. As two of Bunkamu's members are killed leaving only DJ, causing him to ask for help from Tsuyoshi and Asagi as they return from shopping. Ema arrives at Kengo's shop questioning Tsuyoshi's resolve who in turn question her on what she is hiding. DJ once again begs Tsuyoshi for Ema's help, but ends up asking Nami, Lovegen's new leader, for help. She feds him some kind of drug, implied to say that she used to get rid of the rest of Bunkamu, causing him to feel light-headed and have a nosebleed. Tsuyoshi and Asagi try to stop her as she is about to send DJ falling off the building, but it is instead Piece who saves him by killing Nami, raising Tsuyoshi's opinions of him slightly. Ema appears and defeats Piece once again, suffering several serious injuries. She reveals that she continuously kills Piece for Tsuyoshi's sake.
6	"Face.06 Diveout" "Face.06 Daibuauto" (Face.06 ダイブアウト)	February 14, 2005
Tsuyoshi brings DJ to Kengo's shop to recover from the medicine. He helps Tsuyoshi and Asagi shop for food in exchange for staying at Kengo's shop. On the way back, they find Haru being tormented by Palhands who are now requesting people to carry Safety Passage Badges should they not wish to be attacked. Ryuugo, however, decides to back off for the day when Asagi steps up to fight. Haru begs Asagi to return to being Lovegen's boss for a free Shibuya unlike the one Ryuugo wishes to create; she agrees only if Tsuyoshi goes with her. Asagi asked Ema for a nail job and tries to stop her from continuing to involve herself with Tsuyoshi, but Ema reveals that she will not let their past relationship end. After confessing her love to Tsuyoshi, she is finally convinced to return to Lovegen. There she finds out that her parents are not real and that their story is the same as Haru's parents' story. In trying to flee Shibuya, she gets run through by the train, waking up in the real world classroom; however, she is soon sent back to Shibuya where she is then chased by Piece. Ema reveals that Tsuyoshi's name is Revu and that he has kept his promise. DJ calls Tsuyoshi over to save Asagi, but he is too late. Ema is stopped from following them when she is confronted by a robot.
7	"Face.07 Reset" "Face.07 Resetto" (Face.07 リセット)	February 21, 2005
Ema is defeated and recovers at Kengo's place. Tsuyoshi spends the rest of the night and most of the day afterwards trying to deal with Asagi's death. Kengo discusses with Ema about what happens to the 15-year-olds that die; after a period, they return with their memories reset. Thanks to Ootomo, Tsuyoshi gathers his resolve by finding his identity as Tsuyoshi and rejecting his past as Shouta and Revu. DJ appears, announcing his transfer to Palhands, giving Tsuyoshi a cellphone from Ryuugo. Tsuyoshi goes to settle their relationship but is tricked into fighting with Piece. Tsuyoshi ends the fight by burning the lock-on mark given to him on the strap of the cellphone. He finds out that the new Asagi, now called Miu has now joined Palhands.
8	"Face.08 Dead End" "Face.08 Deddo Endo" (Face.08 デッドエンド)	February 28, 2005
Ryuugo does not remember who Asagi is and calls his gang instead to beat up Tsuyoshi. Tsuyoshi spends much of the next looking for people who would know Asagi, only find that only he and Ema remember her. She even finds out that the old members of Bunkamu are in fact alive, now both named Shouta, but only he remembers who they are, whereas DJ believes that they are new. After hearing from Ema that this is how the world of Shibuya works, Tsuyoshi goes to Miu to once more confirm whether she has truly forgotten her identity as Asagi. When Tsuyoshi confirms that Miu does not remember, he begins to wonder who the real him is and compares his desires for Miu's old self to Ema's same sentiments. Ema finds out that Kengo is the one who is controls the city from behind the scenes, though the person in question denies it, saying instead he watches over the city. Kengo punishes Ema by marking her and sending two Pieces after her; she defeats one. She is about to be killed by the other, but Professor Ootomo saves her.
9	"Face.09 Revu" "Face.09 Rebu" (Face.09 レヴ)	March 7, 2005
Ema wakes up in Kengo's shop after the Professor Ootomo blows Piece away. Ootomo gives Tsuyoshi a video recording on a Revu's cellphone of his dying message to Ema. Tsuyoshi confronts Ema once more, but she rejects him. Depressed, Tsuyoshi walks through the city, is then confronted by DJ who, as suggested by Miu, decides to use him to become the boss of Palhands. Palhands appears and Ryuugo tells DJ to call for Ema using Tsuyoshi as a leverage. Tsuyoshi provokes Ryuugo into finally settling their score, which he wins. He then manages to convince Ema to accept him in reconciling his past and to try to escape Shibuya.
10	"Face.10 Piecemaker" "Face.10 Pīsumēkā" (Face.10 ピースメーカー)	March 14, 2005
Kengo sends many, many Pieces after Tsuyoshi and Ema, but they defeat them all. Ema tells him of her past from the time she woke up in Shibuya, her sad memories of knowing people who were reset, and thus her reasons for hating Piece. The next day, they try to find Ootomo in order to find out more. DJ, now the new boss of Palhands, confronts them, but Tsuyoshi words convince Ryuugo that something is wrong with the world. Although Ryuugo saves them, they are confronted by Kengo with at first one robot. Professor Ootomo gives Ema the power of a gun, which she uses to destroy the robot; however, Kengo brings out an army of Robots. They run, but Tsuyoshi ends up having to sacrifice himself in order to allow Ema to destroy them all. He wakes up in the real world classroom where he finds out that everyone is asleep and for what purpose everyone is sent to this virtual Shibuya. There Kengo, the teacher of the classroom tells him that he is seat number 21, Tsuyoshi Mamiya (マミヤツヨシ, Mamiya Tsuyoshi). As he wanders through the real-world academy, he finds a false nail of Ema's and a room marked Special Room (特別室, Tokubetsu Shitsu) containing the real-world Ema. However, an academy official stop him from entering, then returns him to Shibuya, reset. Just before this comes to pass, Tsuyoshi puts the nail in his mouth. He once again wakes up in the midst of rubbish, just as he was at the beginning of the series.
11	"Face.11 End of the World" "Face.11 Sekai no Owari" (Face.11 セカイノオワリ)	March 21, 2005
Tsuyoshi returns to the real world, throwing up the nail, which causes him to recall all the events that passed since the beginning of the series. He finds that the world has been restored and that events that occurred at the beginning are happening all over again, except this time Ema is now the boss of Palhands, with no memory of him. However, she does cry at the sight of the moon, just before going out to fight with Lovegen. During the fight, Piece marks Ema, but she remembers all the events that happened before the restore, performing a Merge and defeating Piece. This causes everyone to revert to their real world appearances and remember their real names. Ema also destroys the eye blimp. Ema only remembers her past once she touches the nail polish segment that Tsuyoshi brought with him from the real world, her past as a very violent individual. Ootomo announces that the world is about to come to an end. The Shibuya clock on the building begins to count down.
12	"Face.12 Reality" "Face.12 Riaru" (Face.12 リアル)	March 28, 2005
They all return to Kengo's place for Katsudon in preparation to leave; however, Ema, remembering her past, has doubts about leaving. Tsuyoshi searches for her after she hides, but to no avail. As Tsuyoshi, Ryuugo, Asagi, DJ, and Kengo are about to leave, the chairman appears and transforms into Piece in order to stop them. Asagi directs Tsuyoshi to Ema, who he then tries to convince to come with him. Meanwhile, everyone else manages to defeat Piece and escape Shibuya. Tsuyoshi proceeds to the boundary; however, the chairman awakes from unconsciousness and fights him as Piece. Ema, however, appears, and together, the two beat Piece once and for all. She decides that she will indeed go with Tsuyoshi to the real world. However, Tsuyoshi finds out that she was in a vegetative state and thus could only live in Shibuya, the world created by Ootomo. Tsuyoshi decides to return to Shibuya in order to be with Ema.
