= Waka Inoue =

Japanese idol, tarento and actress (born 1980)

- 井上 和香
- Born: Naoko Niimura (新村 直子); May 13, 1980 (age 46); Tokyo, Japan
- Occupations: Idol; tarento; actress
- Height: 1.63 m (5 ft 4 in)
- Spouse: Ken Iizuka (m. 2012)
- Children: 2
- Website: Official website

Waka Inoue (井上 和香, Inoue Waka; born May 13, 1980) is a Japanese idol, tarento and actress.

== Early life ==
She was born in Meguro, Tokyo as Naoko Niimura (新村 直子).

== Career ==
Inoue made her debut as a gravure idol in 2002 and went on to make several DVDs through 2006. Inoue also posed for annual calendars through 2010.

She also worked as a guest announcer/interviewer for K-1 in 2006, after replacing Norika Fujiwara. Inoue remains active as an actress, appearing in numerous television commercials and programs, as well as on radio.

== Roles ==
Inoue played herself in episode 488: The Devil of the TV Station, of the Detective Conan anime series.

== Family ==
Her mother is former actress Kyoko Saga.
