= Rosa Kato =

Japanese actress and commercial model (born 1985)

- Born: Rosa Kato; 22 June 1985 (age 40); Kagoshima, Japan
- Other name: Rosa Matsui (married)
- Occupations: Actress, model
- Years active: 2001–present
- Height: 161 cm (5 ft 3 in)
- Spouse: Daisuke Matsui (m. 2011; div. 2025)
- Children: 2
- Website: www.ken-on.co.jp/rosa/

Rosa Kato (加藤 ローサ, Katō Rōsa; born 22 June 1985) is a Japanese actress and commercial model.

== Biography ==
=== Career ===
From April 2004 to March 2005, Kato was a regular guest student on Italian Conversation, a 25-minute NHK TV program for beginners of Italian. She subsequently began appearing in commercials and became a popular model after appearing in Zexy, a Japanese bridal magazine, in 2004.

She appeared in the Japanese film Tokyo Tower with Jun Matsumoto in 2005. In late 2005, she began appearing in Japanese television dramas such as Kindaichi Shonen no Jikenbo. She later won the "Best Newcomer Award" for her performance in Dance Drill (also known as Dandori in Japan) in 2006.

In 2007, she starred in the Japanese drama Jotei with Hana Yori Dango actor Shota Matsuda. In 2008, Kato appeared in several TV dramas such as Oh! My Girl! with Mokomichi Hayami and Change with Takuya Kimura.

=== Early life ===
Kato's mother is Japanese and her father is Italian, both met at an Italian restaurant her father worked at in Yokohama. When Kato was five years old, the family moved to Naples, Italy. At that time she was able to speak and understand Italian, but has since forgotten almost every word. Hence, Kato was a regular guest student on Italian Conversation NHK TV program. She was named Rosa after her paternal grandmother.

=== Personal life ===
On 22 June 2011, Kato's 26th birthday, she married Japanese football player Daisuke Matsui. The next day, she announced on her blog her four-month pregnancy with their first child. She later gave birth to a son in France on 13 December. In February 2014, she gave birth to her second son.

On 17 August 2025, she announced her divorce from Matsui during a variety show. However the exact date of the divorce has not been revealed, but she said it happened "not this year or anything, but a little while ago."

== Filmography ==
=== Films ===
Year	Title	Role	Notes	Ref.
2005	Tokyo Tower			
2005	Simsons		Lead role	
2005	A Day Beyond The Horizon: Itsuka Nami no Kanata ni			
2006	Catch A Wave			
2006	Youki na Gang ga Chikyuu wo Mawasu			
2006	Ichiban Kirei na Mizu		Lead role	
2006	Yoru no Pikunikku (Night Time Picnic)			
2006	Taki 183			
2007	Unfair: The Movie			
2007	Smile Seiya no Kiseki			
2007	Pokémon 10th Movie: Dialga Vs. Palkia Vs. Darkrai			
2008	Detroit Metal City			
2008	Tengoku wa Mada Tooku		Lead role	
2012	Girls For Keeps			
2022	Nagi's Island	Mao Harada		
2023	Mom, Is That You?!			

=== TV dramas ===
Title	Year	Network
Division 1 - Yuku Na Ryoma!	2005	Fuji TV
Kindaichi Shounen No Jikenbo	2005	NTV
Yakusha Damashii	2006	Fuji TV
Tsubasa No Oreta Tenshitachi 2	2006	Fuji TV
Onna No Ichidaiki SP	2006	Fuji TV
Tokkyu Tanaka San Go	2007	TBS
Jotei	2007	TV Asahi
Change	2008	Fuji TV
Oh! My Girl!!	2008	NTV
Ketsuekigatabetsu Onna ga Kekkon Suru Hoho (血液型別オンナが結婚する方法)	2009	Fuji TV
Door To Door	2009	TBS
Samayoi Zakura (サマヨイザクラ)	2009	Fuji TV
Koishite Akuma (恋して悪魔)	2009	Fuji TV
Pro Golfer Hana	2010	NTV
Fuyu no Sakura	2011	TBS

== Awards ==
50th Television Drama Academy Awards: Best Newcomer (Dance Drill)
