= Takashi Tsukamoto =

Japanese actor, singer, and model (born 1982)

- 塚本高史
- Born: October 27, 1982 (age 43); Tokyo, Japan
- Occupations: Actor, singer, model
- Years active: 1997–present

Takashi Tsukamoto (塚本高史, Tsukamoto Takashi; born October 27, 1982) is a Japanese actor, singer, and model.

== Music career ==
Tsukamoto has released three single CDs: "Itsudemo Boku wa" (いつでも僕は, Anytime I am...), "Hitorigoto" (ヒ・ト・リ・ゴ・ト, Soliloquy), "New Morning".

== Film career ==
Tsukamoto portrayed the character Shinji Mimura in the controversial film Battle Royale. He also portrayed the character Gion Toji in the video game Ryū ga Gotoku Kenzan! Both his voice and likeness that was captured using facial scanning technology. He narrated the 2015 film Junk Story, which documents the life of musician hide.

== Filmography ==
=== Television Dramas ===
- Shokuinshitsu (1997)
- Change (1998)
- Shounen Suspense "Scary E-mail" (1998)
- Kurenai (1998)
- Osorubeshi! Otonashi Karensan (1998) – guest
- Psychometrer Eiji 2 (1999)
- A Season of Sentiment (1999)
- Futago Tantei (1999)
- Kasouken no Onna 2 (2000) – guest
- Summer Snow (2000) – gang member (ep. 2,3,6,& 7)
- Cinderella wa Nemuranai (2000)
- Kizudarake no Love Song (2001)
- Fighting Girl (2001) (ep. 1)
- Cherry (2001)
- Onmyouji (2001)
- Rookie (2001) (ep. 6)
- Jidan Kosho Jinnai Tamako Ura File (2001) (SP1)
- Tengoku ni Ichiban Chikai Otoko (2001) (ep. 1)
- Otousan as Hide-chan (2002)
- Tokyo Niwatsuki Ikkodate (2002)
- Koi Seyo Otome (2002)
- Gokusen (2002) – Kurosaki (ep. 9)
- Kisarazu Cat's Eye (2002) – Kizashi Sasaki, nicknamed Ani
- Manhattan Love Story (2003) – Gunma Shinobu
- Stand Up!! (2003)
- Shin Yonigeya Honpo (2003) (ep. 9)
- Densetsu no Madam (2003)
- Ikebukuro West Gate Park Special (2003) – cameo
- Hontou ni Atta Kowai Hanashi (2004) – Tsuneichi Yuya
- Fuufu (2004) – Yamaguchi Ren
- Wakaba (2004) – Tani Jyunichi
- Ichiban Taisetsu na Date (2004) – Oota Kenji (ep. 1,3, & 4)
- Division 1 Runner's High (2004) – Komine Ryugo
- Fire Boys (2004) – Amakazu Shiro
- Chotto Matte Kami-sama (2004)
- Meitantei Akafuji Takashi (2005)
- Kikujiro to Saki 2 (2005) – Kitano Takeshi
- Tiger & Dragon (2005) – Nakatani Ginjiro
- Teppan Shoujo Akane!! (2006) – Ichijo Shinta
- Kekkon Dekinai Otoko (2006) – Murakami Eiji
- Koi no Kara Sawagi Drama Special Love Stories IV (2007)
- Hatachi no Koibito (2007) – Kawamura Yukio
- Ganges Gawa de Butterfly (2007) – Shingo
- Kikujiro to Saki 3 (2007) – Kitano Takeshi
- Tokkyū Tanaka 3 Go (2007) – Kei Hanagata
- Shoni Kyumei (2008) – Kariya Shunsuke
- 6-jikan go ni Kimi wa Shinu (2008) – Yamaha Keishi
- Kansahojin (2008) – Miyazaki Kenji
- Mirai Koshi Meguru (2008) – Akira (ep. 4)
- Miracle Voice (2008) – Toriyama Takashi
- Tokyo Dogs (Fuji TV, 2009, ep7) – Yano Ryosuke
- Teioh (2009) – Sakaki Ryo
- Samayoi Zakura (2009) – Kanogawa Yukihiko
- Magerarenai Onna (NTV, 2010) – Sakamoto Masato
- Taira no Kiyomori (NHK, 2012) – Tōkurō
- Gunshi Kanbei (NHK, 2014) – Gotō Matabei
- Keiji Shichinin (TV Asahi, 2015 - ) - Aoyama Arata, from season 2
- Kono Yo ni Tayasui Shigoto wa Nai (NHK, 2017) – Kasumi's boyfriend
- Godaime San'yūtei Enraku (2019, BS-NTV) – San'yūtei Rakutarō
- I Will Be Your Bloom (TBS, 2022) – Sō Toyotaka (Episodes 1, 6–7)
- Trillion Game (TBS, 2023) – Jin Seiya
- Kamen Rider Gavv (TV Asahi, 2024 - 2025) - Lango Stomach

=== Films ===
- Battle Royale – Shinji Mimura (2000)
- Godzilla, Mothra and King Ghidorah: Giant Monsters All-Out Attack (2001)
- Hikari (2001)
- Aoi Haru (2002)
- Kaminari Hashiru Natsu (2003)
- Kisarazu Cat's Eye: Nihon Series – "ANI"/Sasaki Kizashi (2003)
- Kuzenni mo Saiyakuna Shounen (2003)
- Robot Contest (2003)
- Rockers (2003)
- Princess Blade (2003)
- Koibumi Hiyori ~ Ikarusu no Koibitotachi – Sasaki Kenji (2004)
- Shinku (2005)
- About Love (Part 3) Nomura Shuhei (2005)
- Fugaku Hyakkei (2006)
- Kisarazu Cat's Eye: World Series as "ANI"/Sasaki Kizashi (2006)
- Nada Sōsō (2006)
- Taki 183 (2006)
- Midnight Sun (Taiyō no Uta) (2006)
- Smile Seiya no Kiseki (2007, cameo)
- Sono Toki wa Kare ni Yoroshiku / That Time I Said Hi to My Boyfriend (2007)
- Enma (2007)
- The Longest Night In Shanghai (2007)
- Ikigami (2008)
- Yesterdays (2008)
- Tsurikichi Sanpei (2009)
- Outrage (2010)
- Wachigaiya Itosato (2019) – Serizawa Kamo
- Sadako (2019)
- High & Low: The Worst (2019) – Kōichi "Parko" Haruyama
- Come On, Kiss Me Again! (2020)
- His Bad Blood (2020)
- Tell Me (2022) – I.N.A
- The Three Young-Men in Midnight: The Movie (2022) – Mickey
- Kyoto Camaro Detective (2022)
- The Three Young-Men in Midnight: The Movie 2 (2024) – Mickey
- Cells at Work! (2024) – Teacher Neutrophil

=== Japanese dub ===
- Top Gun (2005 DVD edition) – LT Pete "Maverick" Mitchell (Tom Cruise)
