= Misaki Ito =

Japanese former actress and model (born 1977)

- 伊東 美咲
- Born: Tomoko Anzai; May 26, 1977 (age 49); Iwaki, Fukushima, Japan
- Occupations: Actress; model
- Years active: 1999—2013
- Height: 1.71 m (5 ft 7 1/2 in)
- Spouse: Yoshinori Enomoto (m. 2009)
- Children: 3
- Website: http://www.ken-on.co.jp/artists/ito

Misaki Ito (伊東 美咲, Itō Misaki; born May 26, 1977) is a former Japanese actress and model. Her maiden name is Tomoko Anzai (安斉 智子, Anzai Tomoko).

== Career ==
In 1999, Ito became the Asahi Beer "image girl" and a model under an exclusive contract to CanCam magazine. She also appeared in commercials for Gateway computers and Choya Umeshu.

In 2005, she appeared in the TV drama series Densha Otoko as the love interest of the otaku protagonist. She also appears in ads for Shiseido's MAQuillAGE line of cosmetics (along with Chiaki Kuriyama, Ryoko Shinohara and Yuri Ebihara) and Seiko watches, in addition to being the current Vodafone model in Japan, following on from Yu Yamada. She also provided the look and voice for Q's assistant Miss Nagai in the game James Bond 007: Everything or Nothing.

In 2021, Ito appeared in the variety show Let Me Tell Your Fortune.

== Personal life ==
She and Yoshinori Enomoto (榎本 善紀, Enomoto Yoshinori) (born September 27, 1968), the director of pachinko company Kyoraku Sangyo, registered their marriage on November 18, 2009, and held their wedding ceremony in Hawaii on November 24, 2009.

The couple first met in Hawaii at a wedding of a friend in November 2008. Ito gave birth to a daughter on June 27, 2010. In March 2015 she announced her second pregnancy. She gave birth to a son on June 23, 2015 (four days short of her daughter's fifth birthday). It was announced on Ito's official blog on May 1, 2019, that Ito gave birth to a baby girl, her third child, in late 2018.

In 2020, the family resided in Hawaii. In August 2024, the family moved to Singapore.

== Filmography ==
=== Movies ===
- Moho Han (模倣犯) (2002) – Mariko Arima
- Yomigaeri (黄泉がえり) (2002) – Sachiko
- Face to Face (The Snows 白髪鬼) (2002) – Rureko
- Ju-On: The Grudge (呪怨) (2002) – Hitomi Tokunaga
- 9 Souls (2003) – Yurina
- Umineko (海猫) (2004) – Kaoru Ueda
- Tsuri Baka Nisshi 16 (釣りバカ日誌16 浜崎は今日もダメだった♪♪) (2005) – Misuzu
- About Love (2005) – Michiko
- Tsubakiyama: Kachou no Nanoka-kan (2006) – Tsubaki Kazuyama
- Last Love (2007) – Yui Uehara
- Tengoku de Kimi ni Aetara (2007) – Hiroko Iijima

=== TV dramas ===
- Love Complex (2000) – Riri Nono
- Shin Omizu no Hanamichi (2001) – Mizuki
- Beauty 7 (2001) – Natsuki Ueno
- Suiyoubi no Jouji (2001) – Yukako Hamasaki
- Gokusen (2002) – Shizuka Fujiyama
- The Queen of Lunchtime Cuisine (2002) – Tomato Shiomi
- You're Under Arrest (2002) – Natsumi Tsujimoto
- Blackjack ni Yoroshiku (2003) – Madoka Utsumi
- Tokyo Love Cinema (2003) – Mizuki Sakamoto
- Ryuuten no ouhi - Saigo no koutei (2003) – Lady Tatara
- Kunimitsu no Matsuri (2003) – Masumi Sawa
- Itoshi Kimie (2004) – Ai Asakura
- HOTMAN 2 (2004 TBS) – Furiya Shima
- Tiger & Dragon (2005) – Megumi
- Train Man (2005) – Saori Aoyama
- Dangerous Beauty (2005) – Hiroko Minagawa
- Suppli (2006) – Minami Fuji
- Densha Otoko DX~Saigo no Seisen (2006) – Saori Aoyama
- Maison Ikkoku (2007) – Kyoko Otonashi
- Yama Onna Kabe Onna (2007) – Megumi Aoyagi
- Ejison No Haha (2008) – Noriko Ayukawa

=== TV anime ===
- Agatha Christie's Great Detectives Poirot and Marple (2004) – Magdala "Nick" Buckley (eps. 16–18)

=== Commercials ===
- Shiseido (2005)
- Hitachi
- Vodafone
- Choya
- Nestle Japan
- Mazda
- Seiko
- All Nippon Airways
- Daiwa Securities

=== Video games ===
- James Bond 007: Everything or Nothing (2004) – Miss Nagai

== Awards and nominations ==
=== Awards ===
- Best Smile of the Year (2003)
- 15th Japan Jewelry Best Dresser Prize
- 29th Elan d'or Awards: Newcomer of the Year (2005)
- 28th Japan Academy Film Prize: Newcomer Prize (2005)
- 34th Best Dresser Prize
- 43rd Golden Arrow Prize - Broadcasting and drama section
- 19th DVD Best Talent Prize
- 1st Japan Golden Raspberry Award
- 24th Diamond Personality Prize
