= Norika Fujiwara =

Japanese beauty queen, model and actress (born 1971)

- 藤原紀香 (ふじわら のりか)
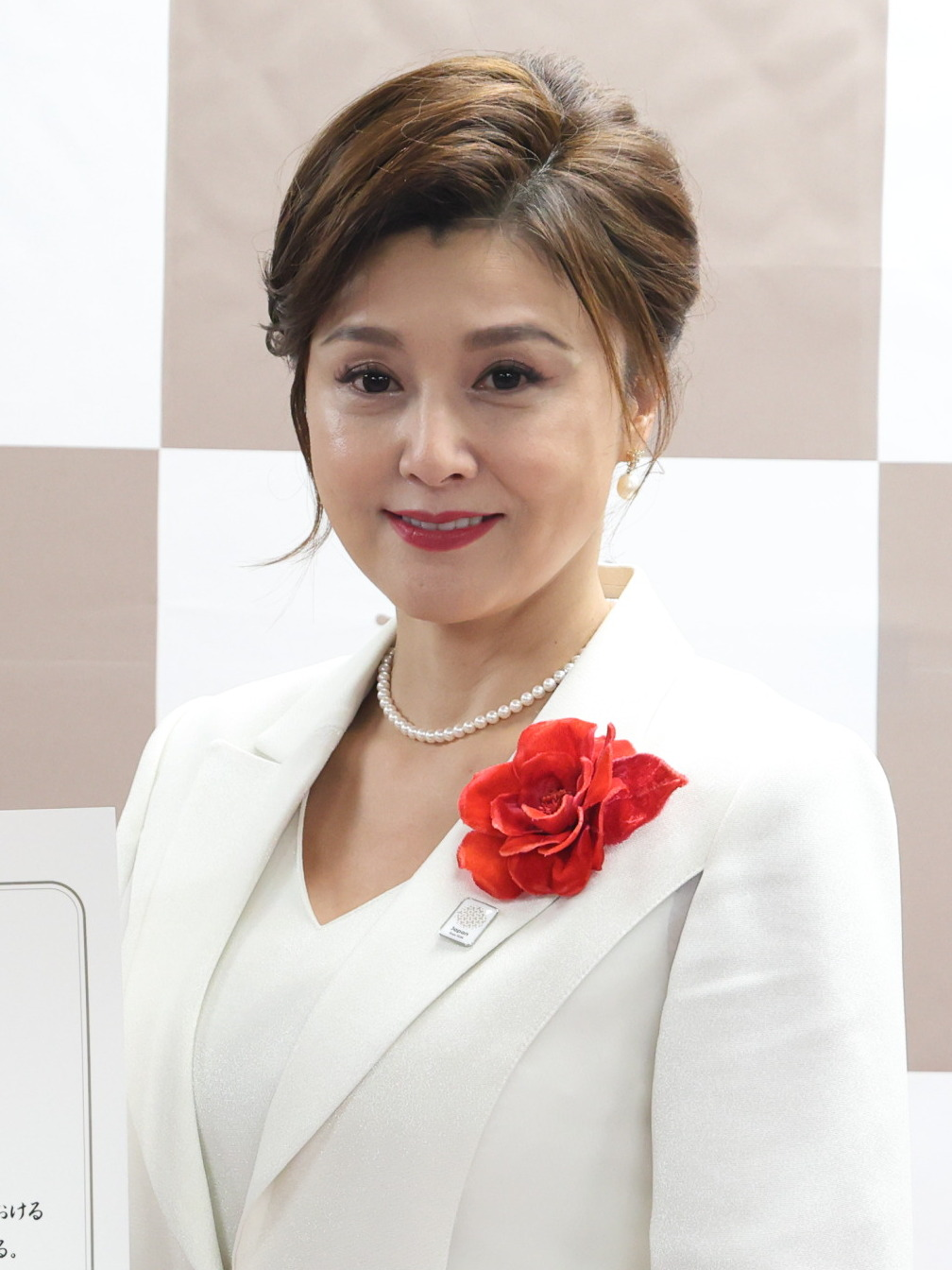
- Born: June 28, 1971 (age 54); Nishinomiya, Hyogo, Japan
- Occupations: Actress; Model
- Years active: 1993–present
- Height: 1.71 m (5 ft 7 1/2 in)
- Spouses: Tomonori Jinnai (m. 2007; div. 2009); Kataoka Ainosuke VI (m. 2016)
- Relatives: Kataoka Hidetarō II (father-in-law); Izumi Yamamoto (sister-in-law)

Norika Fujiwara (藤原 紀香, Fujiwara Norika; born June 28, 1971) is a Japanese actress, model and beauty pageant titleholder. She became Miss Nippon in 1992 and was an exclusive model for fashion magazine CanCam. She has appeared in various commercials and TV series and a number of films in Japan.

== Biography ==
=== Career ===
Fujiwara was born in Nishinomiya, Hyōgo Prefecture. After several years of model work, she became a journalist and spokesperson, including acting as an ambassador of Japanese - Korean friendship during the 2002 FIFA World Cup, reporting from the 2004 Olympics in Greece, and going to Afghanistan and holding a photo exhibition there. Fujiwara was formerly a guest announcer and interviewer for K-1 on their major shows until 2006 when she was replaced by Waka Inoue.

Fujiwara has additionally worked in the video game and anime markets; her latest work as the main character Alicia in Project Minerva (PlayStation 2) (2002), a squad-based, real-time semi-RPG versus rogue robots game, released in an updated English form with more missions as Project Minerva Professional by Midas Interactive of the UK. She voiced Princess Fiona in the Japanese-dubbed version of the Shrek films.

Fujiwara spent one month in a homestay program with a family in the United States and continues to study English. She reportedly hopes to someday act in an English-language film produced in the West such as in the United States or Great Britain. She has already applied her talent to the English language in the film China Strike Force (a.k.a. Spy_N in Japan, with the "N" standing for "Norika") co-starring Aaron Kwok, Mark Dacascos and Coolio. In 2007, she visited India to meet Anand Kumar to make a documentary film on his Super 30 program.

Fujiwara also had a leading role in the live-action film Great Teacher Onizuka where she played a semi-romantic role with Takashi Sorimachi.

=== Political statement ===
In September 2013, Fujiwara openly criticized the government's state secrets bill pending before the Diet. Fujiwara wrote on her website, "Once the bill is signed, the people who will write the truth on the Internet (or through other means) will be punished ... When I think of all the consequences that it will lead to, it really bothers me." Her opinion reportedly was much noted given her status as ambassador for the Japanese Red Cross Society and as a recent recipient of the Nikkei Social Initiative Award for her contributions to society. Fujiwara was grouped with Tarō Yamamoto, another TV celebrity who recently broke Japanese custom by voicing political opinion.

=== Personal life ===
She married Osaka-based comedian Tomonori Jinnai on February 17, 2007 at Ikuta Shrine in Kobe city in Hyōgo Prefecture, and their romance became popular with the public and media. Rumors of their impending divorce emerged on March 19, 2009.

Kataoka Ainosuke VI (6th generation Kabuki actor) and Fujiwara were married September 23, 2016, dressed in traditional Japanese wedding clothes. The couple held their wedding banquet at The Imperial Hotel in Tokyo on September 28, 2016, which was also where they held their marriage announcement press conference earlier in the year.

== Masashi Tashiro ==
Fujiwara once hosted a sport program, called "SRS", by Fuji Television with television star Masashi Tashiro. It was rumored that Masashi Tashiro may have secretly installed a hidden camera in the women's restroom to covertly record Fujiwara and other women changing clothes or using the restroom facilities. However, no video or images from this supposed electronic surveillance has appeared.

Preceded by Emi Okamoto	Miss Nippon; 1992	Succeeded by Yoko Koiwai
