= Miho Shiraishi =

Japanese actress (born 1978)

- Born: August 8, 1978 (age 48); Hitachiōmiya, Ibaraki, Japan
- Years active: 1998–present
- Spouse: Hiroshi Nagano (m. 2016)
- Children: 2

Miho Shiraishi (白石 美帆, Shiraishi Miho; born August 8, 1978) is a Japanese actress from Ibaraki Prefecture, Japan.

== Filmography ==
=== Film ===
- Shiroi Fune (2002)
- Swing Girls (2004) as Yayoi Itami
- Densha Otoko (2005) cameo
- The Harimaya Bridge (2009) as Kayo Takeuchi
- Halfway (2009)
- The Master of Funerals (2019)
- When I Saw Your Sound (2027)

=== TV dramas ===
- Bijo ka Yajuu (2003 Fuji TV)
- Tokyo Love Cinema (2003 Fuji TV)
- Anata no tonari ni dare ga iru (2003 Fuji TV)
- Orange Days (2004 TBS) as Akane Ozawa
- Hotman 2 (2004 TBS)
- Minna Mukashi wa Kodomo Datta (2005 KTV)
- Densha Otoko (2005 Fuji TV) as Misuzu Jinkama
- Sengoku Jieitai (2006 NTV)
- Suppli (2006 Fuji TV)
- Densha Otoko DX: Saigo no Seizen (2006 Fuji TV)
- Nodame Cantabile (2006 Fuji TV) as Kaori Eto (Kozo Eto's wife)
- Dondo Hare (2007 NHK)
- Hanayome to Papa (2007 Fuji TV)
- Kiri no Hi (2008 NHK)
- General Rouge no Gaisen (2010 Fuji TV)
- Hiyokko (2017 NHK) as Kuniko Takeuchi

=== Anime ===
- Fullmetal Alchemist (Psiren)
