= Reiko Takashima =

Japanese actress

- Born: July 25, 1964 (age 61); Yokohama, Kanagawa, Japan
- Occupation: Actress
- Years active: 1987–present
- Spouse: Noboru Takachi (m. 1999; div. 2016)

Reiko Takashima (高島 礼子, Takashima Reiko; born 25 July 1964 in Yokohama, Kanagawa) is a Japanese actress.

== Career ==
Takashima starred in Shinji Aoyama's 1999 film EM Embalming. She has also appeared in films such as K-20: Legend of the Mask, Railways and Space Battleship Yamato.

== Filmography ==
=== Film ===
- Like a Rolling Stone (1994)
- Ruby Fruit (1995)
- Shomuni (1998)
- Dreammaker (1999)
- EM Embalming (1999)
- Sennen no Koi Story of Genji (2001)
- The Boat to Heaven (2003)
- Tsuribaka Nisshi 14 (2003)
- Jusei: Last Drop of Blood (2003)
- Half a Confession (2004)
- The Hidden Blade (2004)
- 2/2 (2005)
- Yakuza Wives: Burning Desire (2005)
- Azumi 2: Death or Love (2005)
- The Ode to Joy (2006)
- Adiantum Blue (2006)
- Oh! Oku (2006)
- Last Love (2007 film) (2007)
- Cahcha (2007)
- K-20: Legend of the Mask (2008)
- 10 Promises to My Dog (2008)
- Pride (2009)
- Killer Virgin Road (2009)
- Dear Heart (2009)
- Space Battleship Yamato (2010)
- Railways (2010)
- Ranhansha (2011)
- Home: Itoshi no Zashiki Warashi (2012)
- Genesect and the Legend Awakened (2013)
- The Next Generation -Patlabor- (2015)
- Sakura Guardian in the North (2018)
- Omiokuri (2018)
- That Girl's Captives of Love (2018)
- JK Rock (2019)
- Howling Village (2020)
- Apparel Designer (2020)
- Inori (2021)
- The Lone Ume Tree (2021)
- The One I Long to See (2023)
- Confetti (2024)
- Curling Dream (2024)
- My Mom, My Angel: A Journey of Love and Acceptance (2024)
- Sound of Wings (2025), Kaise
- The Village of Eight Gravestones (2026), Kotake Tajimi and Koume Tajimi

=== Television ===
- Ōoku (2004) – Oeyo
- Kekkon Dekinai Otoko (2006)
- Tenchijin (2009) – Sentō-In
- Carnation (2011)
- Angel Heart (2015) - Saeko Nogami
- Moribito: Guardian of the Spirit (2016) – Torogai
- Atashinchi no Danshi (2009) - Koganei Kyoko
- Yamato Nadeshiko Shichi Henge (2010) - Nakahara Mine (Oba-san)
- Shiroi Kyotō (2019) - Masako Azuma
- Fixer season 3 (2023)

=== Dubbing ===
- Atlantis: The Lost Empire (2001) – Lieutenant Helga Katrina Sinclair
