= Izumi Inamori =

Japanese actress

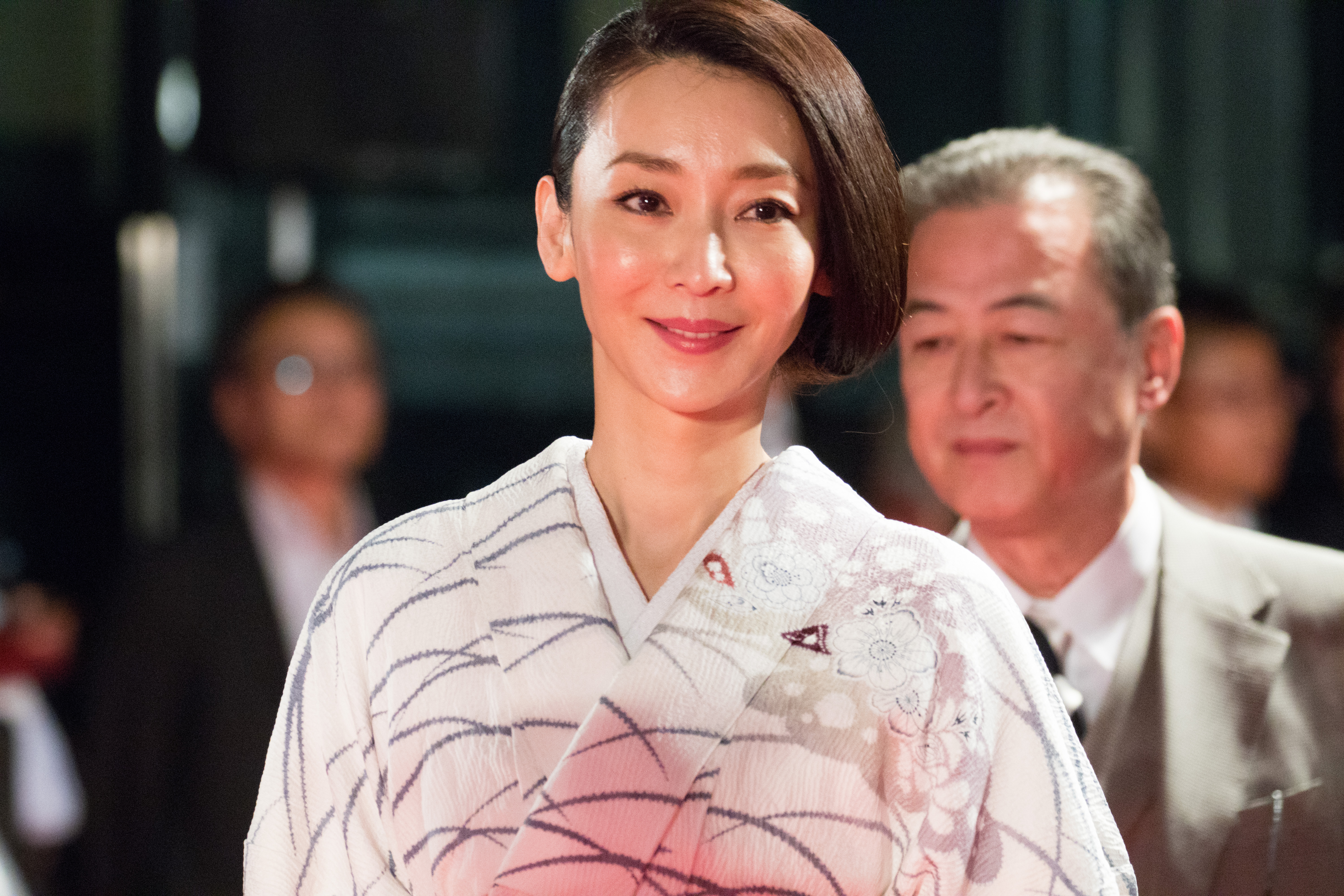
- Inamori at the Tokyo International Film Festival 2016
- Born: Izumi Inamori (稲森 泉); March 19, 1972 (age 54); Kagoshima Prefecture, Japan
- Occupation: Actress
- Years active: 1994–present
- Website: https://www.webburning.com/inamori-izumi/

Izumi Inamori (稲森 いずみ, Inamori Izumi; born March 19, 1972 in Kagoshima Prefecture) is a Japanese actress signed to Burning Production.

== Biography ==
Izumi Inamori was born and grew up in Kagoshima Prefecture. After finished from the local high school, Inamori went to University of Texas at Arlington to study English abroad. After a year and a half of school life in the United States, her family was poor so she returned to Japan, and soon started her career as a model locally at the age of in 20, 1992. In 1994, she made her film debut in the TV drama series "Ue o muite arukō!". She is also a first dan kendoka.

== Filmography ==
=== Movies ===
Year	Title	Role	Notes	Ref.
1997	Cat's Eye	Hitomi Kisugi	Lead role	
2000	Tales of the Unusual	Chiharu Takajō	Lead role; "The Marriage Simulator" segment	
2001	All About Lily Chou-Chou	Izumi Hoshino		
2009	The Code	Mei Laan		
2013	Under the Nagasaki Sky	Saori Takamori		
2022	The Way of the Househusband	Hibari Eguchi		
2022	The Hound of the Baskervilles: Sherlock the Movie	Ira Hasukabe		
2024	Shinji Muroi: Not Defeated			
2024	Shinji Muroi: Stay Alive			

=== TV dramas ===
Year	Title	Role	Notes	Ref.
1994	29sai no Christmas	Maho Fukazawa		
1995	Summer Love Letter	Megumi Nonaka		
1996	Long Vacation	Momoko Koishikawa		
1996	Dear Woman	Kasumi Kanzaki		
1996	Only You	Mami Kawamoto		
1997	Leurs Mariages	Misao Nakahira		
1997	Beach Boys	Haruko Maeda		
1998	Happy Mania	Kayoko Shigeta	Lead role	
2000	Tenki-yohō no Koibito	Sachi Harada		
2002	Pretty Girls	Hana Noyama	Lead role	
2003	Toshishita no Otoko	Chikako Yamaguchi	Lead role	
2005	Yoshitsune	Tokiwa	Taiga drama	
2005	Magarikado no Kanojo	Chiharu Ōshima	Lead role	
2006–2014	Team Medical Dragon	Akira Katō	Season 1, 3, and 4	
2007	The Family	Fusako Tsuruta		
2008	Atsuhime	Takiyama	Taiga drama	
2009	Aishiteru: Kaiyō	Satsuki Noguchi	Lead role	
2010	Kaibutsu-kun	Demorina		
2015	Age Harassment	Yuriko Osawa		
2020	The Way of the Househusband	Hibari Eguchi		
2022	When The Couples Break	Yoko Makabe	Lead role	

== Awards and nominations ==
Year	Award	Category	Work(s)	Result	Ref.
1997	6th TV Life Annual Drama Awards	Best Supporting Actress	Long Vacation and Only You	Won	
1998	7th TV Life Annual Drama Awards	Best Supporting Actress	Beach Boys and Leurs Mariages	Won	
2011	20th TV Life Annual Drama Awards	Best Supporting Actress	Kaibutsu-kun	Won	
