= Saori Koide =

Japanese actress (born 1988)

- 早織
- Born: May 29, 1988 (age 37); Kyoto Prefecture, Japan
- Occupation: Actress
- Years active: 2003–present

Saori Koide (早织 小出, Saori Koide; born May 29, 1988), also credited mononymically as Saori, is a Japanese actress. She is known for her work in television, including Train Man, 1 Litre of Tears, Cell Phone Detective Zenigata Rai, and Return of the Statute of Limitations Police, as well as the films 100 Yen Love and River.

== Early life ==
Saori was born in Kyoto Prefecture. In her second year of junior high school, she applied for a modeling position based on an audition magazine.

Saori graduated from Kyoto Ryoyo High School and later attended Ritsumeikan University.

She was encouraged by a magazine insider to audition for the film Sharaju -- while she did not make the final selection, director Naomi Kawase told Saori, "You're suited to be an actress." Her experience on set as an extra led her to begin studying acting, saying, "I want to be someone who can work with Kawase again." She learned about free lessons offered by Stardust Promotion through an audition magazine. After participating in the "PUSH" audition in De☆View magazine, she joined the Stardust Promotion agency in 2003.

== Career ==
In 2003, she debuted under the stage name Saori Koide as a member of the Japanese idol group Snappeas, the image characters for the summer event Odaiba Adventure King, organized by Fuji Television Network. In the same year, she made her acting debut in Tokyo Girl #006: "The Day to Put a Lid on Stinky Things".

She began appearing regularly on television on Fuji TV's show One Night R&R which helped her become better known. She then moved on to dramas. She gained attention for appearances in Train Man and 1 Litre of Tears, and in 2006 for the lead role in Cell Phone Detective Zenigata Inazuma. She made her film debut in Angel. Her other films include Return of the Statute of Limitations Police and Maiko Haaaan!!!.

Her debut stage name, Saori Koide, was chosen by her agency. In May 2010, she announced that she was changing her stage name to Saori.

In December 2022, Saori announced on her blog that she would be leaving Stardust Promotion, the agency she had been with for 20 years. In April 2023, she announced that she had signed an agency contract with Monopolize Inc.

== Personal life ==
Saori married her husband, who works in the theater industry, in January 2019.

== Filmography ==
=== Film ===
Year	Title	Role	Notes	Ref(s)
2007	Maiko Haaaan!!!	Komako		
2009	The Chef of South Polar	Shimizu		
2014	100 Yen Love	Fumiko Saito		
2023	River	Chino		
2026	Lives at Right Angles			

=== Television ===
Year	Title	Role	Notes	Ref(s)
2005	Train Man	Karin Takeda		
2005	One Liter of Tears	Mari Sugiura		
2007	Time Limit Investigator	Makade	Season 2	
2020	Scarlet	Rikako Yasuda	Asadora	

== Awards and nominations ==
Year	Award ceremony	Category	Work(s)	Result	Ref(s)
2010	Tama Film Festival	Special Award	River	Won	
