= Sekai wa Sore o Ai to Yobundaze =

Single by Sambomaster

from the album Boku to Kimi no Subete o Rock 'n Roll to Yobe
- Released: August 3, 2005
- Genre: Alternative rock J-rock

Sambomaster singles chronology
"Utagoe yo Okore"	"Sekai wa Sore o Ai to Yobundaze"	"Subete no Yoru to Subete no Asa ni Tamborine o Narasu no da"

"Sekai wa Sore o Ai to Yobundaze" (世界はそれを愛と呼ぶんだぜ lit. That's What the World Calls Love) is the Japanese rock band Sambomaster's fifth single.

It was the Japanese drama Densha Otoko's ending song, it was featured on the Hataraki Man soundtrack and was covered in the INiS rhythm video game Moero! Nekketsu Rhythm Damashii Osu! Tatakae! Ouendan 2 as the finale song. It was also covered in Konami's Bemani series, Drummania and Guitarfreaks. In 2007, Japanese singer 'bird' released a remix album, "BIRDSONG EP -cover BESTS for the party-" featuring a jazz-hiphop remix of "Sekai wa Sore o Ai to Yobundaze".

It sold 126,885 units, making it the #76 single on the Oricon top 100 for 2005.

== Track listing ==
1. Sekai wa Sore o Ai to Yobundaze
2. Atsui Suna to Warui Ame
3. Boku ni Sasagu
