= Sambomaster Kyukyou Besuto =

Studio album by Sambomaster
- Released: February 23, 2011
- Genre: Rock
- Length: --
- Label: SMR

Sambomaster chronology
Kimi no Tame ni Tsuyoku Naritai (2010)	Sambomaster Kyukyou Besuto (2011)

Sambomaster Kyukyou Besuto (サンボマスター究極ベスト) is an album by Japanese rock band Sambomaster. It peaked at number 10 on Oricon Albums Chart.

== Track listing ==
CD1:

1. Sekai wa sore wo Ai to Yobunda ze
2. Kibo no Michi
3. Sekai wo Kaesasete okure yo
4. Dekikkonai wo Yaranakucha
5. Hikari no rock
6. Seishun Kyousoukyoku
7. Love song
8. Utagoe yo okore
9. Kimi wo Mamotte, Kimi wo Ai shite
10. Utsukushiki Ningen no Hibi
11. Very Special!!
12. I love you
13. Kimi ni Kirei no Kizuite okure
14. Tegami
15. Subete no Yoru to subete no Asa ni Tanbarin wo Narasu no Da
16. Tsuki ni saku Hana no You ni Naru no
17. Sono Nukumori ni You ga aru

CD2:

1. Sayounara Baby
2. Kore de Jiyuu ni natta no Da
3. Netchu Jidai
4. Futari
5. Atarashiku Hikare
6. Hito wa sore wo Jounetsu to Yobu
7. Shumatsu soul
8. Yogisha de Yatteki ta Aitsu
9. Omoide wa Yogisha ni notte
10. Itoshisa to Kokoro no Kabe
11. Atarashii Asa
12. Asa
13. Itoshiki Hibi
14. Supergirl
15. Zetsubou to Yokubou to Otokonoko to Onnanoko
16. Yoru ga Aketara
17. Anata to Ikitai
