= Sambomaster wa kimi ni katarikakeru =

Sambomaster wa Kimi ni Katarikakeru

Studio album by Sambomaster
- Released: January 19, 2005
- Genre: Rock
- Label: Sony Music

Sambomaster chronology
Atarashiki Nihongo Rock no Michi to Hikari (2003)	Sambomaster wa Kimi ni Katarikakeru (2005)	Boku to Kimi no Subete o Rock 'n Roll to Yobe (2006)

Sambomaster wa Kimi ni Katarikakeru (サンボマスターは君に語りかける, English: Sambomaster Has Something To Say To You) is Sambomaster's second full-length album. It was released in 2005. It was the #76 sold album of the year selling 199,149 units.

== Track listing ==
1. Utagoe Yoo Kore (歌声よおこれ, Rise Up, Singing Voices)
2. Seishun Kyousoukyoku (青春狂騒曲, The Wild Youth Song)
3. Kore de Jiyuu ni Natta no da (これで自由になったのだ, With This, We're Free)
4. Utsukushiki Ningen no Hibi (Sambomaster wa Kimi ni Katarikakeru Version) (美しき人間の日々（サンボマスターは君に語りかけるバージョン）, Beautiful Human Days (Sambomaster Has Something To Say To You Version))
5. Yoru ga Aketara (夜が明けたら, When the Night Comes)
6. Yokubou Rock (欲望ロック, Desire Rock)
7. Omoide wa Yogisha ni Notte (想い出は夜汽車にのって, My Memories Rode the Night Train)
8. Shuumatsu Soul (週末ソウル, Weekend Soul)
9. Anata ga Hito wo Uragiru Nara Boku wa Dareka wo Koroshite Shimatta sa (あなたが人を裏切るなら僕は誰かを殺してしまったさ, I Killed Someone When You Betrayed Them)
10. Muffler no Yureru Aida ni (マフラーの揺れる間に, While the Muffler Shakes)
11. Futari (Futari wa Sekai no Tame ni Version) (ふたり（二人は世界のためにバージョン）, The Two of Us (Two People For the World Version))
12. Tsuki ni Saku Hana no You ni Naru no (月に咲く花のようになるの, We're Like Flowers That Bloom With the Moon)
