= Atarashiki Nihongo Rock no Michi to Hikari =

Atarashiki Nihongo Rokku No Michi To Hikari

Studio album by Sambomaster
- Released: December 12, 2003
- Genre: Rock
- Label: Sony Music

Sambomaster chronology
Atarashiki Nihongo Rokku No Michi To Hikari (2003)	Sambomaster wa kimi ni katarikakeru (2005)

Atarashiki Nihongo Rokku No Michi To Hikari (新しき日本語ロックの道と光) was the first album by the Japanese rock band Sambomaster.

== Track listing ==
1. Itoshiki Hibi
2. Sono Nukumori ni Yō ga Aru
3. Hito wa Sore o Jōnetsu to Yobu
4. Yogisha de Yatte Kita Aitsu
5. Zanzō
6. Kono Yo no Hate
7. Sayonara Baby
8. Oh Baby
9. Soredemo Kamawanai
10. Asa
