= River (2023 film) =

2023 film directed by Junta Yamaguchi

- Film poster
- Japanese: リバー、流れないでよ
- Directed by: Junta Yamaguchi
- Written by: Makoto Ueda
- Produced by: Takahiro Otsuki
- Starring: Riko Fujitani
- Cinematography: Kazunari Kawagoe
- Edited by: Junta Yamaguchi
- Production companies: Europe Kikaku; Tollywood
- Distributed by: Tollywood; Third Window Films; Cineverse
- Release date: June 23, 2023 (Japan)
- Running time: 86 minutes
- Country: Japan
- Language: Japanese

River (Japanese: リバー、流れないでよ, romanized: ribā, nagarenaide yo, lit. 'River, Don't Flow') is a 2023 Japanese comedy film directed by Junta Yamaguchi, written by Makoto Ueda, and starring Riko Fujitani. It was produced by Europe Kikaku. The film shares much of the same cast as Ueda and Yamaguchi's 2020 film Beyond the Infinite Two Minutes, which also involves a time-travel plot.

Set in an old ryokan in the village of Kibune in winter, the movie follows the story of a group of people who get caught in a repeating two-minute loop.

== Plot ==
Fujiya is a long-established winter ryokan and restaurant in Kibune, Kyoto. Mikoto, a waitress, is standing by the Kibune River behind the annex, clenching her fist gently and thinking about something. Soon she returns to work and cleans up the room with the head waiter, but somehow she finds herself repeatedly returning to the bank of the river where she was two minutes ago.

After an introduction and the title screen, the film is composed of two-minute sequences shot in a single take. All the characters remember what happened before the clock resets, so that they quickly realize that they are in a time loop. Some strangers also appear, such as a woman asking for help due to a breakdown. After some sequences, the main characters try to guess the possible causes of the loop in order to break the cycle, which will be done at the last sequence, thanks to cooperation between the characters.

== Cast ==
- Riko Fujitani as Mikoto
- Yūki Torigoe as Taku
- Manami Honjō as Kimi
- Saori Koide as Chino
- Munenori Nagano as the head clerk
- Takashi Sumita as head chef
- Yoshifumi Sakai as Eiji
- Yoshimasa Kondo as Obata
- Masashi Suwa as Nomiya
- Kōda Ishida as Kusumi
- Haruki Nakagawa as Sugiyama
- Shiori Kubo as Hisame
- Kazunari Tosa as hunter
- Masahiro Kuroki as Shiraki

== Production ==
Screenwriter Makoto Ueda said that he chose to use a time loop as the main plot element because it was low-budget and because rewinding time and repeating the same time would allow him to look at life from different angles.

== Release ==
The film was screened at the special event "Secret Cinema" on June 25, 2026, as the "At least once in your life" chosen film by the event's ambassador, Kazunari Ninomiya. The gimmick of the event is that the visitors to the film theaters ignore which film is going to be screened until the film is displayed. That was the case of this film, of which the name was withheld until the event's opening day.

== Reception ==
On review aggregator Rotten Tomatoes, 100% of 26 critics gave River a positive review. Richard Whittaker, writing for The Austin Chronicle, praised the "endearing" nature of the characters and concluded that the film "never once feels tedious." Mae Abdulbaki of Screen Rant praised the film's "fantastic performances" and "deep sense of fun."

== See also ==
- List of films featuring time loops
