= Train Man (TV series) =

- Genre: Comedy, romance
- Created by: Nakano Hitori
- Written by: Mutō Shōgo; Tokunaga Tomokazu
- Directed by: Takeuchi Hideki; Nishiura Masaki; Kobayashi Kazuhiro
- Starring: Misaki Ito; Atsushi Itō; Miho Shiraishi
- Opening theme: "Twilight" by Electric Light Orchestra
- Ending theme: Sekai wa Sore o Ai to Yobundaze by Sambomaster
- Country of origin: Japan
- Original language: Japanese
- No. of episodes: 13 (including two special episodes)

Production
- Producers: Wakamatsu Jisashiki; Kawanishi Migaku

Original release
- Network: Fuji Television
- Release: July 7 – September 22, 2005

Train Man (電車男, Denshaotoko) is a Japanese television drama that aired on Fuji Television. It is based on the Densha Otoko story, which has also been portrayed in other media.

The drama's 11 episodes were aired on Fuji TV from July 7 to September 22, 2005 (with a special episode on October 6, 2005). A two-hour-long TV special, Train Man Deluxe: The Last Crusade, aired on September 23, 2006, featured a visit to Tahiti. Pony Canyon released the series on a DVD box set on December 22, 2005. It also aired in Taiwan's Videoland Japan from January 24, 2006 (with a special episode on December 28, 2006), and in Hong Kong's TVB Jade from April 15, 2006 (with a special episode on January 27, 2007).

== Plot ==
The plot follows the life of Yamada after a chance encounter with Saori, when he rescues her from a drunken man on the train. Saori sends him a set of Hermès tea cups as a thank you gift. Relying on advice from users on a website, he is able to find the courage to change and eventually confess his feelings to Saori.

The drama is filled with various dream sequences in which the characters use to portray their fantasies.

== Cast ==
- Atsushi Itō as Tsuyoshi Yamada (山田 剛司) aka. "Train Man"/"Densha Otoko" (電車男)

The lead protagonist of this drama. Yamada is a typical "otaku" who consults a local website for advice on how to win over Saori. He is very shy at the beginning of the series, often stuttering when talking with the opposite sex as well as to his superiors. In the beginning, he is willing to try to do away with his "otaku" side. Throughout the series, he is able to admit being an "otaku" to Saori and take pride in who he is.

- Misaki Ito as Saori Aoyama (青山 沙織) aka. "Hermes" (エルメス).

The main heroine of the story and Yamada's love interest. After being rescued by Yamada from a drunken man in the train, Saori sends Yamada Hermès teacups as a thank you gift. After her father lied to her mother in the past, and recently coming out of a deceiving relationship, Saori cannot stand being lied to. Through the series she slowly develops feelings for Yamada. In this drama, she has a fondness for Benoist tea.

- Miho Shiraishi as Misuzu Jinkama (陣釜 美鈴)

A client of Yamada, who often bullies Yamada and makes him pay for her meals. In this drama, she is portrayed as a heart breaker leaving a lot of men in her wake. At the end of the series, she is able to convince Saori to give Yamada another chance. She dates Saori's younger brother for a while.

- Eriko Sato as Kaho Sawazaki (沢崎 果歩)

Friend and co-worker of Saori's.

- Risa Sudo as Yūko Mizuki (観月 裕子)
- Mokomichi Hayami as Keisuke Aoyama (青山 啓介)

Saori's younger brother who accidentally discovers the website where Yamada discusses his relationship with Saori and informs her. He dated Jinkama for a while.

- Maki Horikita as Aoi Yamada (山田 葵)

Tsuyoshi's younger sister

- Shirou Kishibe as Tsuneo Yamada (山田 恒夫)

Tsuyoshi's father

- Gekidan Hitori as Yuusaku Matsunaga (松永 勇作)
- Eiji Sugawara as Shinji Kawamoto (川本 真二)
- Saori Koide as Karin Takeda (武田 花梨)
- Shun Oguri as Munetaka Minamoto (皆本 宗孝)
- Kōsuke Toyohara as Kazuya Sakurai (桜井 和哉)

Although he is a rival for Saori's affections, he often unknowingly assists Yamada. He plans elaborate settings in an attempt to woo Saori, but is never able to show her, often getting interrupted at the last minute. At the end of the series, he falls for Jinkama. However their relationship is ended in the TV special when he confesses to Jinkama that he has lost his money.

- Kumiko Akiyoshi as Yuki Aoyama (青山 由紀), Saori's mother
- Chizu Sakurai as Ryoko Hashizume
- Seiji Rokkaku as Sadao Ushijima

A regular to the same messageboard Densha frequents and a die-hard Hanshin Tigers fan. Has a very minor role in the drama but is expanded in the specials.

- Yoichi Nukumizu as Susumu Ichisaka (一坂 進)
- Tatsuya Gashuin as Tominaga (富永)
- Iori Nomizu as Moe Kagami

One of the forum members. Also known as Meganekko.

Atsushi Itō and Misaki Ito have a cameo appearance after the end credits in the movie. In turn, Takayuki Yamada who portrays Densha Otoko in the movie, appears in a brief cameo in the first episode of the TV series, as well as in a special episode. Miho Shiraishi had also a brief role in the movie, but as a different character. The Japanese Rock Band that played the ending credits, Sambomaster, also made a cameo in episode 11 where Densha had to go to the hospital where he believed that Saori has collapsed (a lie by Kazuya).

== Opening sequence ==
The television series makes numerous references and homages to otaku culture. The opening animation is a homage to the legendary Daicon IV "Twilight" anime short, which was created by the founders of Gainax. Also, the space ship in the first opening is similar to the logo of the band ELO, who composed "Twilight".

Though rival anime studio Gonzo produced the Train Man opening and is referenced several times in the series, the producers acknowledged Gainax's work by putting their name in the credits before that of Gonzo. The opening sequence is also a homage of the opening for the cult anime Galaxy Express 999 (1978–81, Toei Animation), in which a poor boy meets the beautiful Maetel and travels through space on the train Galaxy Express 999, which embarks them into adventures.

The series also makes use of Shift JIS art, or Japanese ASCII art during screen transitions and within the story itself.

== Episodes ==
No.	Title	Original release date
1	"A Love Being Watched Over by a Million People"; Transliteration: "Hyakuman-nin ga Mimamotta Koi no Yukue" (Japanese: 100万人が見守った恋の行方)	July 7, 2005
Yamada saves Saori from a drunken man on the train. Saori asks for his address so that she may thank him. She sends him a set of Hermès tea cups. Yamada describes Saori as "Hermes" to the 2channel users. Following the encouragements from the 2channel users, Yamada finally musters up the courage to call Saori up to thank her for the tea cups. The episode ends with Saori's mobile phone ringing.
2	"I'm Off to my First Date; Big Transformation"; Transliteration: "Hatsu Dēto he Muke Dai Henshin" (Japanese: 初デートへ向け大変身)	July 14, 2005
Saori cannot answer the call, so Yamada leaves her a voicemail. When she calls him back, he cannot answer the call. Finally he manages to reach her and he offers her to meet for a dinner. Following the advice from the 2channel users, Yamada changes his appearance to impress Saori. The episode ends when Saori shows up at the meeting point for the dinner date.
3	"Huge First Date Crisis!!"; Transliteration: "Hatsu Dēto ni Dai Pinchi!!" (Japanese: 初デートに大ピンチ!!)	July 21, 2005
Yamada feels the first date was a disaster. However Saori calls and asks if he would like to meet up again. This time however Saori brings a friend along to date.
4	"Summer! Big Surfing Crash Course"; Transliteration: "Natsu! Sāfin Dai Tokkun" (Japanese: 夏!サーフィン大特訓)	July 28, 2005
After Saori mistakes "surfing the web" for surfing, Yamada has to quickly learn how to surf to impress her. After various attempts at learning how to surf, he finally confesses to Saori that he can't surf and that it was a misunderstanding.
5	"Big Anti-stalker Strategy"; Transliteration: "Sutōkā Gekitai Dai Sakusen" (Japanese: ストーカー撃退大作戦)	August 4, 2005
A mysterious stalker starts harassing Saori. Yamada investigates to find out who the stalker is. The stalker is discovered to be a delivery man who delivers to Saori's work.
6	"A (Love) Confession is the Beginning of All Your Troubles!"; Transliteration: "Kokuhaku wa Haran no Makuake!" (Japanese: 告白は波乱の幕開け!)	August 11, 2005
Yamada is invited to Saori's house for the first time for tea. Although he tries to tell Saori he likes her, he is unable to muster the courage. A second date is arranged and Yamada lies to Saori that he can't make it due to work but is actually going to a manga convention. Saori discovers Yamada's lie and is heartbroken.
7	"Getting Rid of my Nerdiness!! Birthday of Tears"; Transliteration: "Datsu Otaku!! Namida no Tanjōbi" (Japanese: 脱オタク!!涙の誕生日)	August 18, 2005
Yamada believes that Saori is disappointed in discovering his "otaku" nature. He decides to give up all his figurines and "otaku" collection. Saori however is saddened only that Yamada had lied to her.
8	"Revived!! Breaking Otaku's Tears"; Transliteration: "Fukkatsu!! Namida no Otaku Hageshiro" (Japanese: 復活!!涙のオタク激白)	August 25, 2005
Yamada is finally able to show Saori his "otaku" nature even with the fear of rejection.
9	"The Final War and Predictions of a Tragedy"; Transliteration: "Saishū Kessen wa Higeki no Yokan" (Japanese: 最終決戦は悲劇の予感)	September 1, 2005
Yamada is invited to dinner with Saori's parents. The episode ends with Saori's younger brother discovering the website in which Yamada discusses his relationship with Saori.
10	"The Final Chapter! A Miraculous Change of Events"; Transliteration: "Saishūshō! Kiseki no Dai Gyakuten" (Japanese: 最終章!奇跡の大逆転)	September 15, 2005
Yamada sinks into a depression after the breakup with Saori. All the 2channel users rally together to try to cheer him up.
11	"Greatest Confession in History!! Graduation Exercises of Tears"; Transliteration: "Shijō Saidai no Kokuhaku!! Namida no Sotsugyōshiki" (Japanese: 史上最大の告白!!涙の卒業式)	September 22, 2005
Saori finally reads through the website and is touched. Yamada is finally able to confess his feelings to her and they both share their first kiss. But soon he must say goodbye to the 2channel users that supported him as the posts soon reaches its maximum limit of 1000 posts.
S1	"Another Ending Special: Train Man VS Guitar Man!!"; Transliteration: "Mō Hitotsu no Saishūkai Supesharu: Densha Otoko VS Gitā Otoko!!" (Japanese: もう一つの最終回スペシャル 電車男VSギター男!!)	October 6, 2005
S2	"Densha Otoko Deluxe: The Final Crusade"; Transliteration: "Densha Otoko Derakkusu: Saigo no Seisen" (Japanese: 電車男DELUXE 最後の聖戦)	September 23, 2006
A ¥10,000,000 reward is offered for anyone who can discover the real identity of Densha Otoko. Yamada believes he has to find the black pearl in Tahiti to prove that his love for Saori will last.

=== Specials ===
==== Special 1: Another Ending ====
The first special contains a few story arcs which chronicles the lives of the other 2channel users. Many scenes from the original series were parodied. e.g. Kazuya confessing to Jinkama like how Yamada confessed to Saori.

===== Ushijima's Story =====
Ushijima believes the love of his life has run off with his money. He finds her but discovers that she did not steal his money but got scammed herself. They reunite happily.

===== Matsunaga's (Guitar Otoko) Story =====
Matsunaga, one of Yamada's friends is tricked into buying a guitar. He attempts to woo Yuko, one of Saori's friends by singing live at the Tokyo Dome.

== Music ==
=== Opening ===
Introductory music from the first episode is "Mr. Roboto" by Styx.

Subsequent openings use the song "Twilight" Electric Light Orchestra.

=== Ending ===
Sambomaster's "Sekai wa Sore o Ai to Yobundaze" (世界はそれを愛と呼ぶんだぜ).

=== Original soundtrack ===
Composed by Face 2 fAKE

Released: August 24, 2005

Duration: 76 min

ASIN: B000A3H62W

JAN: 4547366022209

Label: Sony Music Entertainment

Track list
1. トワイライト
2. START ME @ STARTING LOVE - 月面兎兵器ミーナ
3. a fateful encounter
4 もちつけ俺... (((;°д°)))
5. 名無しさん
6. 喰っちゃったんですか??
7. 詳細キボンヌ
8. めしどこか たのむ
9. キタ───────(°∀°)───────!!!!!
10. 毒男
11. 哀愁のWaltz
12. steal up...
13. ちゃんと掴んでますからw
14. グレイスフルトレーディング
15. ベアノティー ( ´─`)
16. sea of love ~instrumental version~
17. エルメス
18. ちゃんと掴んでますからw ~Acoustic Guitar version~
19. 世界はそれを愛と呼ぶんだぜ ~Bluesharp version~
20. sea of love ~English version~
21. 宇宙のファンタジー
22. コーリング・オール・エンジェルズ
23. ダウンタウン・トレイン
24. Twilight ~A.Piano version~

== Getsumento Heiki Mina ==
The animation sequences for both the opening and series shots of the metafictional anime series Getsumento Heiki Mina (月面 兎 兵器 ミーナ; Lunar Rabbit Weapon Mina) were produced by Gonzo. Both Gonzo and the producers of the Train Man TV series put a concerted effort into creating the appearance of a long-standing franchise, from hiring voice actress Saori Koide (to play both the voice of Mina as well as Karin Takeda, Mina's voice actress) to recording an opening theme for the Mina series, "START ME @ STARTING LOVE" by Missing Link.

Several toys, "video games", custom figurines and other "merchandise" were made specifically for use by otaku in the series. One of the figures, valued at $4000, was inadvertently broken by actor Atsushi Itō during filming. Replicas of the original figure were later sold at the Winter 2005 Comiket.

On January 13, 2007, the real world version of Getsumento Heiki Mina began airing in Japan. Gonzo had mentioned on December 16, 2005 that all the existing sequences and properties from Train Man would be used. However, the narrative of the real-world adaptation of Mina is different from the version written for the drama series.

== Reception ==
On October 25, 2005, Train Man was awarded six prizes at the 46th Television Drama Academy Awards: Best Drama, Best Supporting Actor (Atsushi Itō), Best Supporting Actress (Miho Shiraishi), Best Director (Takeuchi Hideki), Best Musical Arrangement and Best Opening.
