= Ongaku no Kodomo wa Mina Utau =

Studio album by Sambomaster
- Released: January 23, 2008
- Genre: Rock
- Label: Sony Music

Sambomaster chronology
Boku to Kimi no Subete o Rock 'n Roll to Yobe (2006)	Ongaku no Kodomo wa Mina Utau (2008)	Kimi no Tameni Tsuyoku Naritai (2010)

Ongaku no Kodomo wa Mina Utau (音楽の子供はみな歌う All You Musical Kids, Sing) is the fourth album of the Japanese rock band Sambomaster.

== Track listing ==
1. Hikari no Rock (光のロック, Shining Rock)
2. Yureru Love Man no Theme (揺れるラブマンのテーマ, Theme of the Swaying Love Man)
3. Aisuru Koto no Subete (愛することのすべて, Everything That You Love)
4. Shōnen Electric (少年エレクトリック, Electric Boy)
5. Very special!! (Album Version)
6. Orufe vs Goodbye, High School (オルフェvsグッバイハイスクール, Orpheus vs. Goodbye, High School)
7. Good Morning Sentimental Woman (グッドモーニング センチメンタルウーマン)
8. Hikari Hitoshizuku (ひかりひとしずく)
9. 21 Seiki Shōnen Shōjo (21世紀少年少女, 21st Century Boys and Girls)
10. Haru nandesu (春なんです, It's Spring)
11. Seishun no Beru Narippanashi (青春のベル鳴りっぱなし, The Bell of Adolescence Keeps Ringing)
12. Atarashii Asa (新しい朝, New Morning)
13. I Love You (Album Version)
