= Beyond the Infinite Two Minutes =

- Release poster
- Kanji: ドロステのはてで僕ら
- Directed by: Junta Yamaguchi
- Written by: Makoto Ueda
- Produced by: Takahiro Otsuki; Kazuchika Yoshida
- Starring: Kazunari Tosa; Riko Fujitani; Masashi Suwa; Yoshifumi Sakai; Haruki Nakagawa; Munenori Nagano; Takashi Sumita; Chikara Honda; Aki Asakura
- Cinematography: Junta Yamaguchi
- Edited by: Junta Yamaguchi
- Music by: Koji Takimoto
- Production companies: Europe Kikaku; Tollywood
- Distributed by: Tollywood
- Release date: June 5, 2020 (Japan)
- Running time: 71 minutes
- Country: Japan
- Language: Japanese
- Budget: ¥3 million

Beyond the Infinite Two Minutes (Japanese: ドロステのはてで僕ら, romanized: Dorosute no hate de bokura, lit. 'We at the end of the Droste') is a 2020 Japanese science fiction comedy film written by Makoto Ueda, and shot and directed by Junta Yamaguchi in his directorial debut.

== Plot ==
Café owner Kato (Kazunari Tosa) discovers that his computer's monitor shows what will happen two minutes into the future from the perspective of the television in the café, which itself displays what happened two minutes into the past. The computer is brought down to face the television, creating a Droste effect, allowing the characters to see several minutes into the future. Kato's friends and coworkers discover this.

Persuaded by a future version of himself, he decides to ask his love interest, Megumi, on a date; she declines, but Kato is forced to pretend to encourage his past self to prevent a paradox. Kato's friends also attempt to take advantage of the time window, getting caught up in a gang rivalry in the process. Kato uses his knowledge of the near future, as well as objects the group obtained throughout the film, to attack the gang members and save Megumi who has been taken upstairs.

Returning downstairs, they find that two time cops have sedated everyone except himself and Megumi. The cops try to force the pair to ingest memory-wiping powder, but they sneeze it away, causing the cops to disappear from reality as a result of a paradox. Megumi and Kato sit down and discuss their lives together.

== Cast ==
- Kazunari Tosa
- Riko Fujitani
- Masashi Suwa
- Yoshifumi Sakai
- Haruki Nakagawa
- Munenori Nagano
- Takashi Sumita
- Chikara Honda
- Aki Asakura

== Production ==
The film was shot over the course of seven days in a Kyoto café by members of the Europe Kikaku theater troupe. The film, which is edited to appear as if it was shot in one long shot, is an example of nagamawashi, a microgenre of mostly-low-budget one-shot Japanese films that have gained popularity after the success of One Cut of the Dead in 2017. It was made with 3 million Japanese yen.

== Release and reception ==
The film premiered at Tollywood, a small Tokyo cinema, to an audience of twelve. However, due to the COVID-19 pandemic severely limiting production and release of mainstream films, the film was selected to be screened by major theater chain Toho Cinemas.

It went on to pick up a number of awards and nominations in festivals in Sitges, Brussels and Montreal. The film was praised for its playful energy and industrious low-budget spirit. On the review aggregator website Rotten Tomatoes, 99% of 69 critics' reviews are positive, with an average rating of 8.3/10. The website's consensus reads: "A time-travel comedy shot through with infectious energy, Beyond the Infinite Two Minutes offers sci-fi fans a low-key -- and highly entertaining -- treat." The New York Times was relatively negative, arguing that the film "rarely surmounts the twistiness of its premise and the repetitiveness of its setups."

== Awards and nominations ==
Award	Category	Recipient(s)	Result	Ref.
21th Nippon Connection	Nippon Visions Audience Award	Beyond The Infinite Two Minutes	Won	

== See also ==
- River (2023 film)
