= Densha Otoko =

Japanese media franchise

- Cover of the novel's first edition

電車男
- Genre: Romance, comedy
- Novel
- Written by: Nakano Hitori
- Published by: Shinchosha
- English publisher: NA: Del Rey Books
- Published: October 22, 2004
- Manga

Train Man: Densha Otoko
- Written by: Hidenori Hara
- Published by: Shogakukan
- English publisher: NA: Viz Media
- Magazine: Weekly Young Sunday
- Original run: January 6, 2005 – September 5, 2005
- Volumes: 3
- Manga

Densha Otoko: The Story of a Train Man Who Fell in Love With A Girl
- Written by: Wataru Watanabe
- Published by: Akita Shoten
- English publisher: NA: CMX
- Magazine: Champion Red
- Original run: March 20, 2005 – February 20, 2006
- Volumes: 3
- Manga

Train Man: Go, Poison Man!
- Written by: Hitori Nakano
- Illustrated by: Daisuke Dōke
- Published by: Akita Shoten
- Magazine: Weekly Shōnen Champion
- Original run: March 20, 2005 – January 20, 2006
- Volumes: 3
- Manga

Train Man: A Shōjo Manga
- Written by: Machiko Ocha
- Published by: Kodansha
- English publisher: NA: Del Rey Manga
- Published: June 13, 2005
- Related
- Drama television series; Live-action film

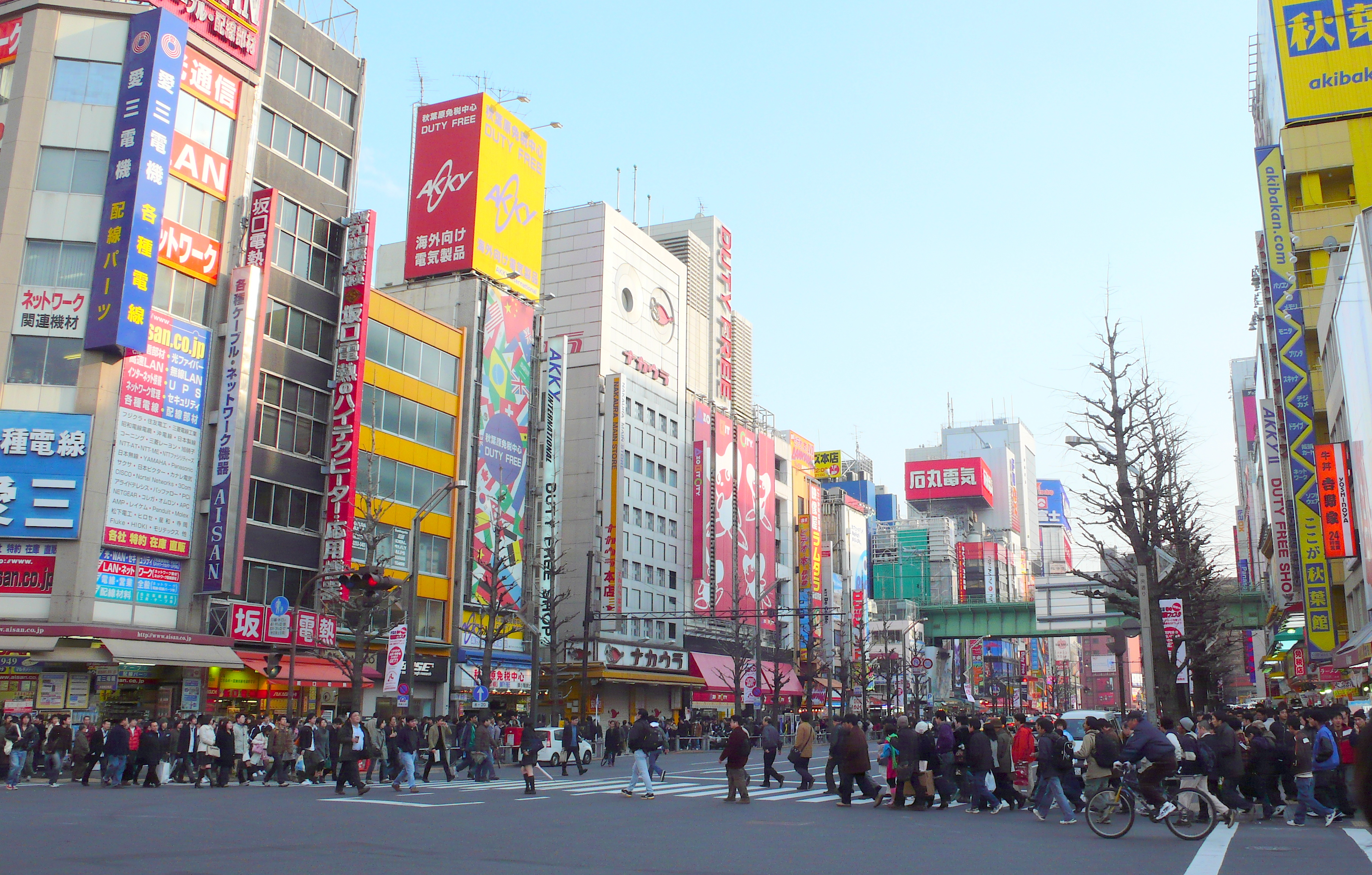
Akihabara crossing

Densha Otoko (電車男; lit. Train Man) is a Japanese movie, television series, manga, novel, and other media, all based on the purportedly true story of a 23-year-old otaku who intervened when a drunk man started to harass several women on a train. The otaku ultimately began dating one of the women.

The event, and the man's subsequent dates with the woman, who became known as "Hermès" (エルメス, Erumesu), were chronicled on the Japanese mega-BBS 2channel. This led to the compilation of the relevant threads in a book, followed by several manga versions, a movie, a theatrical play later released as a DVD, and finally a TV series.

Densha Otoko is a popular example of the "nice guy" class of Japanese geeks who wish to lead normal lives, but are too shy to find a girlfriend, or speak openly only online. The television series uses a large number of computer-bound extras.

== Story ==
On March 14, 2004, at 9:55 p.m., an anonymous user posted in a 2channel thread for single men to talk about their woes. According to his account, he had been sitting next to a young woman on the train when a drunken man entered the car and began to badger a particular woman. The poster took the risk of telling the man to stop bothering the passengers, who were all women. The two struggled for a short time while the other passengers used this distraction to summon the conductor, who took control of the situation.

Never having done such a thing in his life, the poster was amazed to find the woman thanking him deeply for saving her from harassment. The young woman requested his address, telling him that she wanted to express her appreciation for his act, before they parted ways. The poster, upon returning home, shared his experience with other posters in the thread and was eventually nicknamed "Densha Otoko" (Train Man).

A few days later, Train Man received a package from the woman: an expensive set of cups and saucers made by Hermès, a French luxury goods company. Flabbergasted, the man turned to the 2channelers for advice; he was soon convinced that the tea set was too expensive to be a mere thank-you gift. Following the advice and suggestions of the other posters, Train Man eventually contacted the woman.

The man who wrote admitted things about himself, such as the fact that he had never had a girlfriend before, that he was an Akihabara nerd and an otaku, and that he had never been on a date. Because of this last fact, he consistently posted updates on his situation, asking for advice on everything from restaurant choices to what clothing to wear. After an enjoyable first date, they began meeting regularly. Following the 2channelers' collective advice, he got a haircut, updated his wardrobe, and began to emerge from his shell. After several dates, his demeanor had changed for the better and this culminated a few months later in his confessing his love for her. She reciprocated, and when the 2channelers were informed, there was a mass celebration; posts began flowing in congratulating the new couple, and extravagant Shift JIS art pictures were posted.

Train Man's posts continued for a while longer, but on May 17, there were posts about the couple being on the verge of having sex, and several forum members made inappropriate comments on the subject. Later that night, Train Man left the boards for good.

=== Authenticity ===
While many attest to the truth of the story—including the producers of the television series, who supposedly contacted the real Train Man—it has not been proven that the story was completely authentic. The true identity of "Train Man" is never revealed and the book is based on an edited collection of posts on the 2channel bulletin board. The original conversation lasted fifty-seven days and contained 29,862 posts, whereas the book contains 1,919 posts, as collected on a fan website. A list of inconsistencies in the story has been collated, including Train Man being too young to have a university degree and be in the workforce for three years.

== Production ==
The initial setting of the film is in Akihabara, Tokyo.

Mark Schilling of The Japan Times comments that "since Fuji TV intends Densha Otoko for prime-time broadcast, Hermess (Nakatani) can only suggest a big sisterly friendliness and affection, meaning that the sexual chemistry between her and Train Man (Yamada) is zero". Pop Culture Shock's Erin Finnegan reported, "when asked if the original novel would ever be imported, manga industry reps at New York Comic Con lamented that 2chan's version of l33t is nearly impossible to translate." The fansite compiling the posts which became the book has been translated into other languages by fans of the story, including into English in 2006. President and CEO for Viz Pictures, Seiji Horibuchi, comments that the film Train Man: Densha Otoko "will make people think fondly about their own first experiences with love and the thrill and rush it caused. Perhaps it will even inspire a few to take a chance on someone they like!"

For Densha Otoko, two manga versions were seinen (geared toward young men); one was shōnen (for boys); and one was shōjo (for girls). Del Rey Manga licensed the shōjo version from Kodansha, with which it has strong ties. Viz Media licensed a seinen version, and CMX licensed the shōnen version.

— Kai-Ming Cha, Publishers Weekly

== Media ==
=== Book ===
Densha Otoko originated from a fifty-seven-day online conversation, from March 14 to May 16, that included a total of 29,862 posts on 2channel was edited into a six-chapter story, each called "Missions" of 1,919 posts and made available on the Matome site. According to "Fūin sareta 'Densha Otoko'" (封印された｢電車男｣) by Kenji Andō, only 6.4% of the whole conversation thread was published in the Densha Otoko book.

The author of the book used the name "Nakano Hitori" (中野独人). This name is a pun on the Japanese term "Naka no hitori", referring to all the people who are part of message boards on the Internet. There isn't a specific person that is credited as the author; rather, it is close to a shared pseudonym.

Shinchosha released the novel on October 22, 2004. Del Rey Books released the novel, renamed as Train Man, on April 24, 2007.

=== Drama ===
The drama's 11 episodes were aired on Fuji TV from July 7 to September 22, 2005 (with a special episode on October 6, 2005). A two-hour-long TV special, Densha Otoko Deluxe, aired on September 23, 2006. Pony Canyon released the series on a DVD box set on December 22, 2005. It also aired in Taiwan's Videoland Japan from January 24, 2006 (with a special episode on December 28, 2006), and in Hong Kong's TVB Jade from April 15, 2006 (with a special episode on January 27, 2007).

=== Film ===
Densha Otoko film was directed by Shosuke Murakami. It premiered in Japanese Cinemas by Toho on March 26, 2005. The movie was screened in North American cinemas by Viz Pictures on September 22, 2006. Viz Media released the DVD of Train Man: Densha Otoko on February 6, 2007. The ending theme is "Love Parade" (ラヴ・パレード) by Orange Range. The movie stars Takayuki Yamada as Train Man/Densha Otoko and Miki Nakatani as Hermes.

=== Manga versions ===
There are four manga adaptations of Densha Otoko:

- Train Man: Densha Otoko (電車男〜ネット発、各駅停車のラブストーリー〜, Densha Otoko: Net-hatsu, Kakueki-teisha no Love Story; "Train Man: Internet, Local Train Love Story") is written and illustrated by Hidenori Hara. It was serialized in Shogakukan's Young Sunday from January 6, 2005. Shogakukan released the manga's three tankōbon volumes between April 5, 2005, and September 5, 2005. It was licensed in North America by Viz Media, which released the manga's three tankōbon volumes between October 10, 2006, and February 13, 2007. It is licensed in Spain by Glènat España as Otaku in Love, in France by Kurokawa and in Germany by Carlsen Comics.
- Densha Otoko: The Story of a Train Man Who Fell in Love with a Girl (電車男〜でも、俺旅立つよ.〜, Densha Otoko: Demo, Ore Tabidatsuyo) is written and illustrated by Wataru Watanabe. It was serialized in Akita Shoten's Champion Red from January 19, 2005. Akita Shoten released the manga's three tankōbon volumes between March 20, 2005, and February 20, 2006. Akita Shoten re-released the manga in two tankōbon volumes, both released on October 8, 2013. The manga is licensed in North America by CMX, which released the manga's three tankōbon volumes between October 11, 2006, and April 30, 2007. It is licensed in France by Taifu Comics.
- Train Man: Go, Poison Man! (電車男 がんばれ毒男!, Densha Otoko: Ganbare Dokuo!) is written by Hitori Nakano and illustrated by Daisuke Dōke. It was serialized in Akita Shoten's Weekly Shōnen Champion from December 28, 2004. Akita Shoten released the manga's three tankōbon volumes between March 20, 2005, and January 20, 2006. It is available in English as a scanlation.
- Train Man: A Shōjo Manga (電車男〜美女と純情ヲタク青年のネット発ラブストーリー, Densha Otoko: Bijo to Junjō Otaku Seinen no Net-hatsu Love Story; "Train Man: Beauty and the Simple Otaku-Boy, an Internet Love Story") is a one shot shōjo manga written and illustrated by Machiko Ocha. Kodansha released the manga on June 13, 2005. The manga is licensed in North America by Del Rey Manga, which released the manga on November 7, 2006.

== Reception ==
Densha Otoko novel sold 260,000 copies in just three weeks and 500,000 copies in two months. Following its popularity, "Chikan Otoko" was produced, the story of a man who is accused of being a groper on public transport, and Napoleon Dynamite was retitled Basu Otoko ("Bus Man") for its Japanese release. The Japan Times' Janet Ashby commented that the book felt like an "otaku wish-fulfillment fantasy: Someday I will magically meet Miss Right, rescue her like a knight on a white horse, be transformed into Mr. Right, and we will live happily ever after. The reaction of Miss Hermes when Trainman belatedly shows her the log of his postings about their private affairs was particularly unbelievable to me. Far from being hurt or angry, she is impressed by what good friends he has!"

Mania.com's Matthew Alexander commends Densha Otoko: The Story of a Train Man Who Fell in Love With A Girl for being realistic, saying, "right after [Train's] session with a hair stylist, his hair is standing up in the right spots and looks good. Then, just like in real life, a couple of days afterwards his hair is back to looking like a shorter version of his hairstyle before it got cut. A very small part of the story I know, but I really appreciated the effort at displaying realism." Coolstreak Comics' Leroy Douresseaux comments on Densha Otoko: The Story of a Train Man Who Fell in Love With A Girl, saying, "Watanabe understands the visual metaphor of the comics medium, which allows him to deliver his story with a force that captures the quiet awkwardness of two shy people". IGN's A.E. Sparrow comments on the artwork of Densha Otoko: Train Man saying, "Hidenori Hara brings an old school style to his illustration, and there are moments where the complex panel layouts (particularly when several online people are offering advice at once) recall some of Will Eisner's best work." A later review by Sparrow comments that Hidenori Hara's "work seems the most cartoonish of the bunch, with some of the characters looking almost like afterthoughts, but it's that scribbling style that really sets this version of the story apart." He also comments on Hermess looking "like a slightly more pixie-ish version of Lisa Hayes from Robotech". Anime News Network's Carlo Santos' review of Train Man: A Shōjo Manga commends it for its "unique character viewpoint and a sweet, lighthearted mood". However, he criticises it for "skimping on plot and character development; sometimes awkward with Internet humor."

Watanabe draws a Hermess that is among the cutest female manga characters I have ever seen, making her the perfect object of affection for Train. And the facial expressions that he captures throughout this volume are very appropriate and revealing, giving us a great insight into their heads. Plus, not to be outdone, each character looks unique, which is something that many manga artists have a problem with.

— Robert Murray, Manga Life, review of Densha Otoko: The Story of a Train Man Who Fell in Love With A Girl

== See also ==
- My Sassy Girl
- Dokuo
