= Sambomaster =

Japanese rock band

- Origin: Japan
- Genres: Alternative rock, indie rock, power pop
- Years active: 2000–present
- Labels: Sony Music Japan
- Members: Takashi Yamaguchi (lead vocal, guitar); Yasufumi Kiuchi (drums, chorus); Yoichi Kondo (bass, chorus)
- Website: The Official Sambomaster Site Sony Music's Official Site

Sambomaster (サンボマスター, Sanbomasutā) is a Japanese rock band signed by Sony Music Japan. The band's name, Sambomaster, refers to the Russian martial art called Sambo.

== History ==
Lead vocalist and guitarist Takashi Yamaguchi first met drummer Yasufumi Kiuchi at a university music club where they were both members. The duo ran into bassist Yoichi Kondo during February 2000, and the three went on to officially form the band now known as Sambomaster. They made their debut at a live house in Tokyo's Kōenji district and soon followed this up with the self-production of their first single "Kick no Oni" (Kicking Demons), which they spent nearly a year working on. It was subsequently released in April 2001 as a limited edition of 300 copies. For the first time, listeners outside of a live show were presented with vocalist and frontman Yamaguchi's vocals, which shift between a soft, sandpaper-like melodic voice to all-out screaming madness. Sambomaster's musical style is a blend of punk/classic rock, pop, jazz and rock ballads.
The year 2003 saw the release of their very first major-label album, Atarashiki Nihongo Rock no Michi to Hikari and a live performance at the Fuji Rock festival's Rookie GO GO. This led to a huge rise in their success and more widespread notoriety. They have been gathering acclaim from both critics and regular listeners ever since.

In 2004 and 2005, Sambomaster released the majority of their hit singles including "Seishun Kyōsōkyoku" and "Sekai wa Sore wo Ai to Yobundaze"; "Seishun Kyōsōkyoku" was used as the fifth opening theme to the hit anime series Naruto, and "Sekai wa sore Ai to Yobunda ze" ended up being the ending theme to the popular Japanese television drama Densha Otoko (and also Nintendo DS game Moero! Nekketsu Rhythm Damashii Osu! Tatakae! Ouendan 2). They were also asked to do the main theme to the movie Koi no Mon, which became the song Tsuki ni Saku Hana no Yō ni Naru no. Recently, their song Hikari no Rock was featured as the single for the film Bleach: The DiamondDust Rebellion. In March 2009, their song "Kimi wo Mamotte, Kimi wo Aishite" was announced to be the nineteenth ending song in the hit anime series Bleach. In 2010, they performed the ending theme for the Kuragehime anime, "Kimi no Kirei ni Kizuite Okure". In 2018, their song "Love Song" was used as the ending theme for Tada Never Falls In Love, being covered by the voice actors for the male and female leads.

=== Parody ===
In March 2005, 3 members of the television variety show Haneru no Tobira ("You Knock on a Jumping Door!") filmed a comedy sketch called "Busambomaster". The sketch featured a music video parody of the 3 Haneru members pretending to be Sambomaster, playing a Sambomaster-style song called "Iitai koto mo iezuni" (English: "Not even saying what I want to say"). However, the 3 Haneru members also made their faces look like caricatures of Yamaguchi, Kiuichi, and Kondo, with features such as enlarged nostrils, buck teeth, and profuse sweating. The lyrics of the song were also made to humiliate lead vocalist Yamaguchi's tendency to scream his thoughts out to fans before and after songs (and sometimes in the middle of songs). Many Sambomaster fans were offended by the song, and after much protesting, Haneru no Tobira eventually apologized on their show.

== Members ==
Takashi Yamaguchi (山口隆 Yamaguchi Takashi)

- Born: February 8, 1976
- Hometown: Fukushima.
- Attended Fukushima Prefectural Aizu high school and graduated from Toyo University Faculty of Law. He typically shortens the shoulder strap of his guitar in order to keep it in a high position.
- Instrument(s) Used: 1960 Gibson Les Paul Special TV Yellow – Gibson Les Paul Custom – Gibson sg red – Fender Telecaster Who tribute.

Yasufumi Kiuchi (木内泰史 Kiuchi Yasufumi)

- Born: August 4, 1976
- Hometown: Chiba
- Instrument(s) Used: Canopus Drum Kit.

Yoichi Kondo (近藤洋一 Kondo Yoichi)

- Born: June 16, 1977
- Hometown: Tochigi.
- Yoichi had his acting debut in the 2010 film "solanin" starring Aoi Miyazaki. He played a character named "Kato."
- Instrument(s) Used: Fender Jazz Bass – Fender Precision Bass – Rickenbacker Bass 4003.

== Discography ==
=== Singles ===
"Kick no Oni" (indie) (April 2001)

1. Introduction
2. Kung-fu Rock
3. Golden Circle no Ornette Coleman
4. Kick no Oni
5. Saikyō Cyclone
6. Tsunagari
7. Sambomaster no Kyūjitsu

"Utsukushiki Ningen no Hibi" (April 7, 2004)

1. Utsukushiki Ningen no Hibi
2. Netchū Jidai
3. Dandan
4. Sono Nukumori ni Yō ga Aru (studio live version)

"Tsuki ni Saku Hana no Yō ni Naru no" (July 22, 2004)

1. Tsuki ni Saku Hana no Yō ni Naru no
2. Tegami (King of Soul mix)
3. Itoshiki Hibi (Nashville Skyline version)
4. Hito wa Sore o Jounetsu to Yobu (live version)

"Seishun Kyōsōkyoku" (December 1, 2004)

1. Seishun Kyōsōkyoku
2. Tsunagari (King of Laidback mix)
3. Ame
4. Seishun Kyōsōkyoku (Naruto opening mix)

"Utagoe yoo kore" (April 27, 2005)

1. Utagoe yoo kore
2. Sad Ballad no Sekai
3. Seishun Kyōsōkyoku (live version)

"Sekai wa Sore wo Ai to Yobundaze" (August 3, 2005)

1. Sekai wa Sore o Ai to Yobunda ze
2. Atsui Suna to Warui Ame
3. Boku ni Sasagu

"Subete no Yoru to Subete no Asa ni Tamborine o Narasu no da" (November 2, 2005)

1. Subete no Yoru to Subete no Asa ni Tambourine o Narasu no da
2. Ano Kane o Narasu no wa Anata
3. Hanarenai Futari

"Tegami" (March 15, 2006)

1. Tegami: Kitarubeki Ongaku to Shite
2. Get Back Sambomaster
3. Yoyogi nite

"Itoshisa to Kokoro no Kabe" (August 2, 2006)

1. Itoshisa to Kokoro no Kabe
2. Sekai wa Sore o Ai to Yobunda ze (live version)

"I Love You" (April 18, 2007)

1. I Love You
2. Beibi Beibi Su
3. Coaster
4. Kyōkai Mae Tōri

"Very Special!!" (July 25, 2007)

1. Very Special!!
2. Ubai Toru Koto Nitsuite
3. Utsukushiki Ningen no Hibi (Sekai Rokku Senbatsu version)

"Hikari no Rock" (December 12, 2007) (theme song for BLEACH: The DiamondDust Rebellion)

1. Hikari no Rock
2. Hikari no Rock (Instrumental)

"Kimi wo Mamotte, Kimi wo Aishite" (June 10, 2009) (19th ending theme for Bleach)

1. Kimi wo Mamotte, Kimi wo Aishite
2. Akashi
3. Boku wa Jiyuu
4. Kimi wo Mamotte, Kimi wo Aishite (Bleach Version)

"Rabu Songu" (November 18, 2009) (English: Love Song)

1. Rabu Songu
2. Sekai wo Kaesasete okure yo
3. Rabu Songu (Instrumental)
4. Sekai wo Kaesasete okure yo (Instrumental)

"Dekikkonai o Yaranakucha" (February 24, 2010)

1. Dekikkonai o Yaranakucha
2. Pop Life
3. Boku no Namae wa Blues to iimasu
4. Dekikkonai o Yaranakucha (Instrumental)

"Kimi ni Kirei no Kizuite okure" (December 1, 2010)

1. Kimi ni Kirei no Kizuite okure (Kuragehime ED)
2. Introduction
3. Sekai wo Kaesasete okure yo (live version)
4. Zanzou (Live Version)
5. Kore de Jiyuu ni natta no Da (live version)
6. MC (Live Version)
7. Love Song (Live Version)
8. Sono Nukumori ni You ga aru (live version)
9. Dekikkonai wo Yaranakucha (live version)

"Kibo no Michi" (February 23, 2011)

1. Kibo bo Michi
2. Intro
3. Utagoe yo okore
4. Tsuki ni saku Hana no You ni naru no
5. MC 1
6. Baby Yasashi Yoru ga Kitte
7. Sayounara Baby
8. Sekai wa sore wo Ai to Yobunda ze
9. MC 2
10. Utsukushiki Ningen no Hibi
11. Outro

=== Albums ===
Atarashiki Nihongo Rock no Michi to Hikari (December 12, 2003)

- English: The Way and Light of New Japanese Rock

Sambomaster wa kimi ni katarikakeru (January 19, 2005)

- English: Sambomaster Is Talking to You

Boku to Kimi no Subete o Rock 'n Roll to Yobe (April 12, 2006)

- English: Call Everything That We (You and I) Are 'Rock n' Roll'

Ongaku no Kodomo wa Mina Utau (January 23, 2008)

- English: All You Musical Kids, Sing

Kimi no Tameni Tsuyoku Naritai (April 21, 2010)

Sambomaster Kyukyou Besuto (February 23, 2011)

Sambomaster to Kimi (2015)

YES (March 20, 2018)

=== Concert DVDs ===
Atarashiki Nihongo Rock o Kimi ni Katarikakeru: Sambomaster Shoki no Live Eizōshū (November 2, 2005)

A UMD version with the same track list was released on November 30, 2005.

1. Kung-fu Rock: Aware na Bobu Isoide Ike yo
2. Itoshiki Hibi: Futari
3. Zanzō
4. Yogisha de Yattekita Aitsu: Sono Nukumori ni Yō ga Aru
5. Yogisha de Yattekita Aitsu
6. Hito wa Sore o Jonetsu to Yobu
7. Utsukushiki Ningen no Hibi
8. Itoshiki Hibi
9. Sono Nukumori ni Yō ga Aru
10. Asa
11. Seishun Kyōsōkyoku
12. Tegami
13. Yokubō Rock
14. Sayonara Baby
15. Utagoe yoo kore
16. Korede Jiyū ni Natta no Da
17. Shūmatsu Soul
18. Sono Nukumori ni Yō ga Aru
19. Tsuki ni Saku Hana no Yō ni Naru no

Atarashiki Nihongo Rock no Video Clip Collection (October 18, 2006)

1. (Videoclip) Sono Nukumori ni Yō ga Aru
2. (Videoclip) Sono Nukumori ni Yō ga Aru (Studio Live Version)
3. (Videoclip) Utsukushiki Ningen no Hibi
4. (Videoclip) Tsuki ni Saku Hana no Yō ni Naru no
5. (Videoclip) Seishun Kyōsōkyoku (Haikyo Version)
6. (Videoclip) Seishun Kyōsōkyoku (Samba Version)
7. (Videoclip) Utagoe yo Okore
8. (Videoclip) Sekai wa Sore o Ai to Yobunda ze
9. (Videoclip) Subete no Yoru to Subete no Asa ni Tambourine o Narasu no da
10. (Videoclip) Tegami: Kitarubeki Ongaku to Shite
11. (Special Track) Making Clip – Seishun Kyōsōkyoku (Samba Version)
12. (Special Track) Making Clip – Sekai wa Sore o Ai to Yobunda ze
13. (Special Track) Making Clip – Subete no Yoru to Subete no Asa ni Tambourine o Narasu no da
14. (Special Track) TV Commercial

Boku to Kimi no subete wa Hibiya yagahi Ongaku-do de Utae (December 6, 2006)

1. Futari bocchi no Sekai
2. Zetsubou to Yokubou to Otokonoko to Onnanoko
3. Itoshisa to Kokoro no Kabe
4. Utagoe yo okore
5. Futatsu no Namida
6. Sekai wa sore wo Ai to Yobunda ze
7. Sensou to Boku
8. Boku to kimi no subete wa Atarashiki Uta de Utae
9. Utsukushiki Ningen no Hibi
10. Subete no Yoru to subete no Asa ni Tanbarin wo Narasu no da
11. Tegami
12. Sono Nukumori ni You ga aru
13. Nanigenakute idaina kimi
14. Tsuki ni saku Hana no You ni Naru no
15. Seishun Kyousoukyoku
16. Asa

Sekai rokku senbatsu fainaru zenkyoku yatte ura natsu fesu o buttobashita hi (March 12, 2008)

1. Utagoe yo okore
2. Zanzou
3. Kore de Jiyuu ni natta no Da
4. Hito wa sore wo Jounetsu to Yobu
5. Sayounara Baby
6. Very Special!!
7. Tsunagari
8. Konoyo no Hate
9. Omoide wa Yogisha ni notte
10. Ano musume no mizugi ni natte mitai noda
11. Zetsubou to Yokubou to Otokonoko to Onnanoko
12. Sad ballad no Sekai
13. Futari bocchi no Sekai
14. Boku to Kimi no subete wa Atarashiki Uta de Utae
15. Futari
16. Netchu Jidai
17. Seishun Kyousoukyoku
18. Asa
19. Anata ga hito o uragirunara boku wa dare ka o koroshite shimatta sa
20. Sekai wa soredemo Shizun de Ikundaze
21. Yogisha de yattekita aitsu
22. Muffler no Yoreru Aida ni
23. Oh Baby
24. Yoru ga Aketara
25. Yoyogi ni te
26. Baby Baby Sue
27. Baby Yasashi Yoru ga Kitte
28. Dan Dan
29. Kyoukai Mae Toori
30. Ubai toru koto nitsuite
31. Coaster
32. Soredemo Kamawanai
33. Boku ni Sasagu
34. Kimi no Koe wa Boku no Koi Boku wo Na wa Kimi no Yoru
35. Shoumatsu soul
36. Ano kane o Narasu no wa anata
37. Itoshiki Hibi
38. Hanarae nai Futari
39. Futatsu no Namida
40. Yokubou rock
41. Get back Sambomaster
42. Tokyo no Yoru sayounara
43. Atsui suna to warui Ame
44. Sensou to Boku
45. Ame
46. Nanigenakute idaina Kimi
47. I love you
48. Shinnon Fukei
49. Tegami
50. Itoshisato Kokoro no Kabe
51. Utsushiki Ningen no Hibi
52. Subete no Yoru to subete no Asa ni Tanbarin wo Narasu no Da
53. Tsuki ni saku Hana no You ni naru no
54. Sekai wa sore wo Ai to Yobunda ze
55. Sono Nukumori ni You ga aru

=== Other albums ===
Hōkago no Seishun (July 2, 2003) Sambomaster appeared in a split album with the band Onanie Machine. This is the first appearance of some of Sambomaster's future hit songs, such as "Utsukushiki Ningen no Hibi", "Tegami", and "Sononukumori ni Yō ga Aru" (as well as the other two in their own right). The versions on this album feature only Takeshi, Yasufumi, and Yoichi playing the songs. Later versions, such as the versions on their singles and albums, were touched up, polished, re-mixed, and sometimes re-recorded with extra musicians. In a sense, the songs on this album are the "original" versions. Sambomaster songs are tracks 6 to 10 below:

1. Mendokusee
2. Lovewagon
3. Boku wa Stalker
4. Soshiki
5. Pokochin
6. Sayonara Baby
7. Utsukushiki Ningen no Hibi
8. Tegami
9. Futari
10. Sono Nukumori ni Yō ga Aru

E.V. Junkies II "Guitarocking" (June 30, 2004)
Sambomaster has 2 songs on this compilation album, tracks 9 and 14 below. "Itoshiki Hibi: Country Sad Ballad ver." is a version with Alice singing most of the vocals.

1. Kimi to iu Hana / Asian Kung-Fu Generation
2. Magic Words / Straightener
3. Mountain a Go Go / CaptainStraydum
4. Shalilala / Flow
5. Ima made nan domo / The Massmissile
6. Nostalgic / The Droogies
7. Jitterbug / Ellegarden
8. Gunjō / Tsubakiya Quartette
9. Tsunagari / Sambomaster
10. Shiroi Koe / Lunkhead
11. Boku no Sonzai wa Uso janakatta / Outlaw
12. Alive / Raico
13. Rakuyou: Long Ver. / Orange Range
14. Itoshiki Hibi: Country Sad Ballad ver. / Alice meets Sambomaster

Magokoro Covers (September 1, 2004)

Sambomaster recorded a cover of Magokoro Brothers' "Dear John Lennon" in this compilation album.

1. Endless Summer Nude (Tomita Lab. Remix) / 冨田ラボ
2. Sora ni Maiagare / Okuda Tamio
3. Ai / Halcali
4. Loop Slider / Suneohair
5. Ningen wa Mō Owari da! / Puffy
6. Stone / Tokyo Ska Paradise Orchestra
7. Standard 3 / Rosetta Garden
8. Haikei, John Lennon / Sambomaster
9. Baby Baby Baby / Yuki
10. Subarashiki kono Sekai / Imawano Kiyoshirō
11. Atarashii Yoake / MB's

Koi no Mon original soundtrack (September 23, 2004) Sambomaster was featured in the original soundtrack of the movie Koi no Mon. Sambomaster songs are tracks 1, 2, 14, 15, and 18 below:

1. Tsuki ni Saku Hana no Yō ni Naru no
2. Hito wa Sore o Jōnetsu to Yobu
3. Mohawk!
4. Four Finger
5. Noiko no Heya
6. Aquam
7. Ishi ga ite, Kimi ga ite
8. Big Site
9. Fukashigi Jikken Karada Gibarengaa
10. Fortress Europe
11. Office Blue
12. Agatha
13. S
14. Kono yo no Hate: koi no mon short version
15. Kono yo no Hate: koi no mon strings version
16. 6:27
17. Kaisō
18. Sambomaster wa Shūmatsu ni Soul Instrument o suru no da no Kan
19. Koi no Mon
