= Kimi no Tame ni Tsuyoku Naritai =

Kimi no Tameni Tsuyoku Naritai

Studio album by Sambomaster
- Released: April 21, 2010
- Genre: Rock
- Length: 59 Minutes
- Label: SMR

Sambomaster chronology
Ongaku no Kodomo wa Mina Utau (2008)	Kimi no Tameni Tsuyoku Naritai (2010)

Singles from Kimi no Tame ni Tsuyoku Naritai
- 1. "Kimi wo Mamotte, Kimi wo Aishite" Released: June 10, 2009; 2. "Rabu Songu" Released: November 18, 2009; 3. "Dekikkonai wo Yaranakucha" Released: February 24, 2010

Kimi no Tame ni Tsuyoku Naritai (きみのためにつよくなりたい) is the fifth studio album by the Japanese rock band Sambomaster. The song "Kimi wo Mamotte, Kimi wo Aishite" was used as the nineteenth Bleach ending.

== Track listing ==
1. Rabu Songu (ラブソング, Love Song)
2. Anata To Ikitai (あなたといきたい)
3. Dekikkonai wo Yaranakucha (できっこないを やらなくちゃ)
4. Sekai wo Kaesasete Okureyo (Kimi no Tameni Tsuyoku Naritai Version) (世界をかえさせておくれよ (きみのためにつよくなりたいバージョン))
5. Boku no Suki na Kimi ni (僕の好きな君に)
6. Ai towa Ai Towa (愛とは 愛とは)
7. Kimi wo Mamotte Kimi wo Aishite (Kimi no Tameni Tsuyoku Naritai Version) (君を守って 君を愛して (きみのためにつよくなりたいバージョン))
8. Ai Won Chu (アイ ウォン チュー, I Want You)
9. Suro na Disuko Nishite kure (スローなディスコにしてくれ)
10. I love you & I hate the world
11. Kasa ni Sasete Kure (傘にさせてくれ)
12. Kimi wa Tomoshibi (きみはともしび)
13. Atarashiku Hikare (新しく光れ)
