= Dokuo =

Japanese slang term for single males

Dokuo (毒男; literally "poison man") is a Japanese slang term for single males which originated on the 2channel internet textboard. The term derives from the Japanese dokushin otoko (独身男) or dokushin dansei (独身男性).
