= Boku to Kimi no Subete o Rock 'n Roll to Yobe =

Studio album by Sambomaster
- Released: April 12, 2006
- Genre: Rock
- Label: Sony Music

Sambomaster chronology
Sambomaster wa kimi ni katarikakeru (2005)	Boku to Kimi no Subete o Rock 'n Roll to Yobe (2006)	Ongaku no Kodomo wa Mina Utau (2008)

Boku to Kimi no Subete o Rock 'n Roll to Yobe (僕と君の全てをロックンロールと呼べ) is the third album of the Japanese rock band Sambomaster.

== Track listing ==
1. Futari Bocchi no Sekai
2. Tegami ~Kitarubeki Ongaku to Shite~
3. Sekai wa Sore o Ai to Yobunda ze (album version)
4. Kimi no Koe wa Boku no Koi, Boku no Na wa Kimi no Yoru
5. Zetsubō to Yokubō to Otokonoko to Onnanoko
6. Sekai wa soredemo Shizun de Ikundaze
7. Sensō to Boku
8. Itoshisa to Kokoro no Kabe
9. Shinon Fūkei
10. Get Back Sambomaster
11. Ano Musume no Mizugi ni Natte Mitai no da
12. Futatsu no Namida
13. Hanarenai Futari (album version)
14. Baby Yasashii Yoru ga Kite
15. Subete no Yoru to Subete no Asa ni Tambourine o Narasu no da (album version)
16. Tokyo no Yoru Sayonara
17. Boku to Kimi no Subete wa Atarashiki Uta de Utae
18. Nani Genakute Idai na Kimi
